= Nordic combined at the 2026 Winter Olympics – Individual normal hill/10 km =

Individual normal hill/10 km at the XXV Olympic Winter Games
- Nordic combined
- Venue: Predazzo Ski Jumping Stadium, Cross country and biathlon center Fabio Canal
- Date: 11 February 2026
- Competitors: 36 from 15 nations
- Winning time: 29:59.4

Medalists
1st place, gold medalist(s)		Jens Lurås Oftebro	Norway
2nd place, silver medalist(s)		Johannes Lamparter	Austria
3rd place, bronze medalist(s)		Eero Hirvonen	Finland

The individual normal hill/10 km competition in Nordic combined at the 2026 Winter Olympics was held on 11 February, at the Predazzo Ski Jumping Stadium (ski jumping) and Cross country and biathlon center Fabio Canal (cross-country skiing). Jens Lurås Oftebro of Norway won the event, his third Olympic medal and first individual gold, with Johannes Lamparter of Austria second, and Eero Hirvonen of Finland third. For Lamparter and Hirvonen, these were the first Olympic medals.

== Background ==
The 2022 champion, Vinzenz Geiger, qualified for the Olympics, as did the bronze medalist Lukas Greiderer. However, Greiderer did not participate in the event. The silver medalist Jørgen Graabak retired from competitions. Before the Olympics, Johannes Lamparter was leading the 2025–26 FIS Nordic Combined World Cup ranking. Jarl Magnus Riiber was the 2025 World champion. He retired from competitions.

== Results ==
=== Ski jumping ===
The ski jumping part was started at 10:00.

Rank	Bib	Name	Country	Distance (m)	Points	Time difference
1	26	Kristjan Ilves	Estonia	99.0	132.6	
2	31	Thomas Rettenegger	Austria	100.0	128.9	+0:15
3	23	Ryōta Yamamoto	Japan	102.5	127.8	+0:19
4	33	Einar Lurås Oftebro	Norway	99.0	127.5	+0:20
4	32	Stefan Rettenegger	Austria	99.0	127.5	+0:20
6	36	Johannes Lamparter	Austria	104.5	127.4	+0:21
7	35	Jens Lurås Oftebro	Norway	104.0	125.6	+0:28
8	28	Vinzenz Geiger	Germany	98.0	125.3	+0:29
9	30	Ilkka Herola	Finland	98.5	124.6	+0:32
10	25	Eero Hirvonen	Finland	96.0	123.5	+0:36
11	21	Akito Watabe	Japan	100.0	122.3	+0:41
12	29	Johannes Rydzek	Germany	97.0	122.0	+0:42
13	34	Julian Schmid	Germany	100.0	121.9	+0:43
14	27	Andreas Skoglund	Norway	96.5	120.6	+0:48
15	12	Sora Yachi	Japan	96.5	120.3	+0:49
16	16	Ben Loomis	United States	95.0	118.9	+0:55
17	19	Marco Heinis	France	97.0	118.1	+0:58
18	15	Jiří Konvalinka	Czech Republic	96.0	117.4	+1:01
19	22	Niklas Malacinski	United States	97.5	114.3	+1:13
20	9	Gašper Brecl	Slovenia	93.5	113.9	+1:15
21	10	Wille Karhumaa	Finland	94.5	112.9	+1:19
22	24	Samuel Costa	Italy	95.0	112.1	+1:22
23	20	Laurent Muhlethaler	France	93.0	111.1	+1:26
24	18	Jan Vytrval	Czech Republic	93.0	110.9	+1:27
25	8	Zhao Jiawen	China	94.5	110.2	+1:30
26	14	Vid Vrhovnik	Slovenia	91.5	106.9	+1:43
27	17	Aaron Kostner	Italy	91.0	106.8	+1:43
28	11	Maël Tyrode	France	88.5	105.1	+1:50
29	4	Miłosz Krzempek	Poland	90.0	104.4	+1:53
30	7	Ruubert Teder	Estonia	90.0	101.3	+2:05
31	2	Oleksandr Shumbarets	Ukraine	89.5	98.6	+2:16
32	5	Dmytro Mazurchuk	Ukraine	88.0	97.0	+2:22
33	13	Alessandro Pittin	Italy	88.0	95.8	+2:27
34	6	Zhao Zihe	China	88.0	93.4	+2:37
35	3	Chingiz Rakparov	Kazakhstan	84.0	87.9	+2:59
36	1	Kacper Jarząbek	Poland	78.5	82.7	+3:20

=== Cross-country ===
The cross-country part was started at 13:45.

Rank	Bib	Name	Country	Start time	Cross-country		Finish time	Deficit
Rank	Bib	Name	Country	Start time	Time	Rank	Finish time	Deficit
1st place, gold medalist(s)	7	Jens Lurås Oftebro	Norway	0:28	29:31.4	2	29:59.4	
2nd place, silver medalist(s)	6	Johannes Lamparter	Austria	0:21	29:39.4	3	30:00.4	+1.0
3rd place, bronze medalist(s)	10	Eero Hirvonen	Finland	0:36	29:25.9	1	30:01.9	+2.5
4	5	Stefan Rettenegger	Austria	0:20	29:57.0	5	30:17.0	+17.6
5	9	Ilkka Herola	Finland	0:32	29:49.5	4	30:21.5	+22.1
6	1	Kristjan Ilves	Estonia	0:00	30:40.5	8	30:40.5	+41.1
7	14	Andreas Skoglund	Norway	0:48	30:17.3	6	31:05.3	+1:05.9
8	12	Johannes Rydzek	Germany	0:42	30:26.8	7	31:08.8	+1:09.4
9	2	Thomas Rettenegger	Austria	0:15	31:27.7	13	31:42.7	+1:43.3
10	8	Vinzenz Geiger	Germany	0:29	31:22.4	12	31:51.4	+1:52.0
11	11	Akito Watabe	Japan	0:41	31:10.4	10	31:51.4	+1:52.0
12	4	Einar Lurås Oftebro	Norway	0:20	31:56.0	15	32:16.0	+2:16.6
13	22	Samuel Costa	Italy	1:22	31:00.0	9	32:22.0	+2:22.6
14	13	Julian Schmid	Germany	0:43	32:12.4	16	32:55.4	+2:56.0
15	3	Ryōta Yamamoto	Japan	0:19	32:37.4	19	32:56.4	+2:57.0
16	27	Aaron Kostner	Italy	1:43	31:35.2	14	33:18.2	+3:18.8
17	16	Ben Loomis	United States	0:55	32:43.4	20	33:38.4	+3:39.0
18	19	Niklas Malacinski	United States	1:13	32:26.1	17	33:39.1	+3:39.7
19	33	Alessandro Pittin	Italy	2:27	31:12.8	11	33:39.8	+3:40.4
20	18	Jiří Konvalinka	Czech Republic	1:01	33:03.9	23	34:04.9	+4:05.5
21	21	Wille Karhumaa	Finland	1:19	32:47.9	22	34:06.9	+4:07.5
22	17	Marco Heinis	France	0:58	33:12.3	24	34:10.3	+4:10.9
23	15	Sora Yachi	Japan	0:49	33:29.9	27	34:18.9	+4:19.5
24	20	Gašper Brecl	Slovenia	1:15	33:14.4	25	34:29.4	+4:30.0
25	28	Maël Tyrode	France	1:50	32:45.3	21	34:35.3	+4:35.9
26	24	Jan Vytrval	Czech Republic	1:27	33:18.2	26	34:45.2	+4:45.8
27	32	Dmytro Mazurchuk	Ukraine	2:22	32:35.9	18	34:57.9	+4:58.5
28	26	Vid Vrhovnik	Slovenia	1:43	33:48.5	28	35:31.5	+5:32.1
29	23	Laurent Muhlethaler	France	1:26	34:20.5	30	35:46.5	+5:47.1
30	31	Oleksandr Shumbarets	Ukraine	2:16	33:58.1	29	36:14.1	+6:14.7
31	25	Zhao Jiawen	China	1:30	35:26.2	31	36:56.2	+6:56.8
32	35	Chingiz Rakparov	Kazakhstan	2:59	35:49.0	32	38:48.0	+8:48.6
33	36	Kacper Jarząbek	Poland	3:20	36:03.7	33	39:23.7	+9:24.3
34	30	Ruubert Teder	Estonia	2:05	37:25.6	34	39:30.6	+9:31.2
35	29	Miłosz Krzempek	Poland	1:53	39:39.5	35	41:32.5	+11:33.1
36	34	Zhao Zihe	China	2:37	39:49.0	36	42:26.0	+12:26.6
