= Nordic combined at the 2026 Winter Olympics – Individual large hill/10 km =

Individual large hill/10 km at the XXV Olympic Winter Games
- Nordic combined
- Venue: Predazzo Ski Jumping Stadium, Cross country and biathlon center Fabio Canal
- Date: 17 February 2026
- Competitors: 36 from 15 nations
- Winning time: 24:45.0

Medalists
1st place, gold medalist(s)		Jens Lurås Oftebro	Norway
2nd place, silver medalist(s)		Johannes Lamparter	Austria
3rd place, bronze medalist(s)		Ilkka Herola	Finland

The individual large hill/10 km competition in Nordic combined at the 2026 Winter Olympics was held on 17 February, at the Predazzo Ski Jumping Stadium (ski jumping) and Cross country and biathlon center Fabio Canal (cross-country skiing). Jens Lurås Oftebro of Norway won gold and Johannes Lamparter of Austria silver, replicating their performance a few days earlier in the normal hill/10 km event. Ilkka Herola of Finland won the bronze medal, his first Olympic medal.

== Background ==
The 2022 champion, Jørgen Graabak, retired from competitions. The silver medalist, Jens Lurås Oftebro, and the bronze medalist, Akito Watabe, qualified for the event. Before the Olympics, Johannes Lamparter was leading the 2025–26 FIS Nordic Combined World Cup ranking. Jarl Magnus Riiber was the 2025 World champion. He retired from competitions.

== Results ==
=== Ski jumping ===
The ski jumping part was started at 10:00.

Rank	Bib	Name	Country	Distance (m)	Points	Time difference
1	23	Ryōta Yamamoto	Japan	136.5	150.0	
2	36	Johannes Lamparter	Austria	136.0	148.0	+0:08
3	27	Andreas Skoglund	Norway	132.0	146.1	+0:16
4	31	Thomas Rettenegger	Austria	137.0	145.4	+0:18
5	35	Jens Lurås Oftebro	Norway	132.5	144.6	+0:22
6	26	Kristjan Ilves	Estonia	137.0	144.0	+0:24
7	30	Ilkka Herola	Finland	130.5	141.9	+0:32
8	25	Eero Hirvonen	Finland	132.5	139.3	+0:43
9	33	Einar Lurås Oftebro	Norway	130.0	138.9	+0:44
10	19	Marco Heinis	France	129.0	133.8	+1:05
11	32	Stefan Rettenegger	Austria	129.0	133.1	+1:08
12	22	Niklas Malacinski	United States	129.5	129.9	+1:20
13	10	Wille Karhumaa	Finland	127.5	129.5	+1:22
14	12	Sora Yachi	Japan	128.5	129.3	+1:23
15	29	Johannes Rydzek	Germany	123.5	129.2	+1:23
16	34	Julian Schmid	Germany	124.5	126.2	+1:35
17	20	Laurent Muhlethaler	France	126.0	125.4	+1:38
18	28	Vinzenz Geiger	Germany	120.5	124.3	+1:43
19	21	Akito Watabe	Japan	125.5	122.5	+1:50
20	14	Vid Vrhovnik	Slovenia	126.5	121.9	+1:52
21	15	Jiří Konvalinka	Czech Republic	125.0	120.5	+1:58
22	16	Ben Loomis	United States	123.0	119.2	+2:03
23	8	Zhao Jiawen	China	125.0	118.7	+2:05
24	11	Maël Tyrode	France	123.0	118.5	+2:06
25	9	Gašper Brecl	Slovenia	121.0	115.2	+2:19
26	4	Miłosz Krzempek	Poland	120.0	114.8	+2:21
27	17	Aaron Kostner	Italy	120.0	110.8	+2:37
28	24	Samuel Costa	Italy	116.0	106.0	+2:56
29	18	Jan Vytrval	Czech Republic	115.0	105.1	+3:00
30	6	Oleksandr Shumbarets	Ukraine	114.5	104.0	+3:04
31	13	Alessandro Pittin	Italy	115.0	102.2	+3:11
32	2	Zhao Zihe	China	119.5	101.4	+3:14
33	1	Ruubert Teder	Estonia	118.0	99.8	+3:21
34	3	Dmytro Mazurchuk	Ukraine	112.0	91.7	+3:53
35	5	Chingiz Rakparov	Kazakhstan	108.0	88.4	+4:06
36	7	Kacper Jarząbek	Poland	102.0	76.2	+4:55

=== Cross-country ===
The cross-country part was started at 13:45.

Rank	Bib	Name	Country	Start time	Cross-country		Finish time	Deficit
Rank	Bib	Name	Country	Start time	Time	Rank	Finish time	Deficit
1st place, gold medalist(s)	5	Jens Lurås Oftebro	Norway	0:22	24:23.0	1	24:45.0	
2nd place, silver medalist(s)	2	Johannes Lamparter	Austria	0:08	24:42.9	4	24:50.9	+5.9
3rd place, bronze medalist(s)	7	Ilkka Herola	Finland	0:32	24:27.8	2	24:59.8	+14.8
4	3	Andreas Skoglund	Norway	0:16	25:10.9	9	25:26.9	+41.9
5	8	Eero Hirvonen	Finland	0:43	24:48.5	6	25:31.5	+46.5
6	9	Einar Lurås Oftebro	Norway	0:44	24:50.3	7	25:34.3	+49.3
7	6	Kristjan Ilves	Estonia	0:24	25:22.4	12	25:46.4	+1:01.4
8	11	Stefan Rettenegger	Austria	1:08	24:46.7	5	25:54.7	+1:09.7
9	18	Vinzenz Geiger	Germany	1:43	24:38.1	3	26:21.1	+1:36.1
10	15	Johannes Rydzek	Germany	1:23	24:59.2	8	26:22.2	+1:37.2
11	4	Thomas Rettenegger	Austria	0:18	26:12.6	19	26:30.6	+1:45.6
12	16	Julian Schmid	Germany	1:35	25:32.1	14	27:07.1	+2:22.1
13	12	Niklas Malacinski	United States	1:20	25:47.4	16	27:07.4	+2:22.4
14	10	Marco Heinis	France	1:05	26:03.9	17	27:08.9	+2:23.9
15	1	Ryōta Yamamoto	Japan	0:00	27:09.4	29	27:09.4	+2:24.4
16	13	Wille Karhumaa	Finland	1:22	26:06.8	18	27:28.8	+2:43.8
17	24	Maël Tyrode	France	2:06	25:42.3	15	27:48.3	+3:03.3
18	27	Aaron Kostner	Italy	2:37	25:19.0	10	27:56.0	+3:11.0
19	19	Akito Watabe	Japan	1:50	26:15.2	20	28:05.2	+3:20.2
20	17	Laurent Muhlethaler	France	1:38	26:28.9	23	28:06.9	+3:21.9
21	14	Sora Yachi	Japan	1:23	26:45.9	28	28:08.9	+3:23.9
22	20	Vid Vrhovnik	Slovenia	1:52	26:19.5	21	28:11.5	+3:26.5
23	28	Samuel Costa	Italy	2:56	25:30.0	13	28:26.0	+3:41.0
24	31	Alessandro Pittin	Italy	3:11	25:19.6	11	28:30.6	+3:45.6
25	21	Jiří Konvalinka	Czech Republic	1:58	26:41.0	25	28:39.0	+3:54.0
26	25	Gašper Brecl	Slovenia	2:19	26:21.3	22	28:40.3	+3:55.3
27	22	Ben Loomis	United States	2:03	26:41.9	26	28:44.9	+3:59.9
28	23	Zhao Jiawen	China	2:05	27:29.4	30	29:34.4	+4:49.4
29	29	Jan Vytrval	Czech Republic	3:00	26:35.5	24	29:35.5	+4:50.5
30	34	Dmytro Mazurchuk	Ukraine	3:53	26:45.8	27	30:38.8	+5:53.8
31	30	Oleksandr Shumbarets	Ukraine	3:04	27:49.3	31	30:53.3	+6:08.3
32	35	Chingiz Rakparov	Kazakhstan	4:06	28:36.0	32	32:42.0	+7:57.0
33	26	Miłosz Krzempek	Poland	2:21	30:59.9	35	33:20.9	+8:35.9
34	32	Zhao Zihe	China	3:14	30:07.4	34	33:21.4	+8:36.4
35	36	Kacper Jarząbek	Poland	4:55	29:02.0	33	33:57.0	+9:12.0
	33	Ruubert Teder	Estonia	3:21	Did not start			
