= Rettenegger =

Rettenegger is a surname. Notable people with the surname include:

- Stefan Rettenegger (born 2002), Austrian Nordic combined skier
- Thomas Rettenegger (born 2000), Austrian Nordic combined skier
