= Estonia at the 2026 Winter Olympics =

- Flag of Estonia
- IOC code: EST
- NOC: Estonian Olympic Committee
- Website: www.eok.ee/en

in Milan and Cortina d'Ampezzo, Italy 6 February 2026 – 22 February 2026
- Competitors: 31 (16 men and 15 women) in 11 sports
- Flag bearers (opening): Marten Liiv & Johanna Talihärm
- Flag bearers (closing): Marten Liiv & Niina Petrõkina
- Medals Ranked 25th: Gold 0 Silver 1 Bronze 0 Total 1

Winter Olympics appearances (overview)
- 1928; 1932; 1936; 1948–1988; 1992; 1994; 1998; 2002; 2006; 2010; 2014; 2018; 2022; 2026

Other related appearances
- Soviet Union (1956–1988)

Estonia competed at the 2026 Winter Olympics in Milan and Cortina d'Ampezzo, Italy, from 6 to 22 February 2026.

Speed skater Marten Liiv & biathlete Johanna Talihärm were the country's flagbearer during the opening ceremony. Meanwhile, Marten Liiv and Niina Petrõkina were the country's flagbearer during the closing ceremony.

== Medalists ==
Medal	Name	Sport	Event	Date
Silver	Henry Sildaru	Freestyle skiing	Men's halfpipe	20 February

== Competitors ==
The following is the list of number of competitors participating at the Games per sport/discipline.

Sport	Men	Women	Total
Alpine skiing	1	0	1
Biathlon	4	4	8
Cross-country skiing	3	5	8
Curling	1	1	2
Figure skating	1	1	2
Freestyle skiing	1	2	3
Nordic combined	2	—N/a	2
Skeleton	0	1	1
Ski jumping	2	0	2
Speed skating	1	0	1
Snowboarding	0	1	1
Total	16	15	31

== Alpine skiing ==
Estonia qualified one female and one male alpine skier through the basic quota, but gave up their female quota. Hanna Gret Teder qualified, but did not participate due to an injury she got on 17 January.

Athlete	Event	Run 1		Run 2		Total	
Athlete	Event	Time	Rank	Time	Rank	Time	Rank
Tormis Laine	Men's giant slalom	1:18.84	32	1:12.73	28	2:31.57	28
Tormis Laine	Men's slalom	DNF					

== Biathlon ==
Estonia qualified four female and four male biathletes through the 2024–25 Biathlon World Cup score.

Men

Athlete	Event	Time	Misses	Rank
Mark-Markos Kehva	Men's individual	58:09.3	1 (0+0+0+1)	47
Mark-Markos Kehva	Men's sprint	26:43.7	3 (2+1)	79
Jakob Kulbin	Men's individual	1:05:17.3	7 (2+2+3+0)	87
Jakob Kulbin	Men's sprint	26:30.7	2 (2+0)	74
Kristo Siimer	Men's individual	59:09.6	3 (1+1+1+0)	58
Kristo Siimer	Men's pursuit	36:02.0	3 (0+1+2+0)	44
Kristo Siimer	Men's sprint	25:43.1	0 (0+0)	53
Rene Zahkna	Men's individual	57:55.5	2 (0+1+0+1)	42
Rene Zahkna	Men's pursuit	36:54.1	6 (2+1+1+2)	51
Rene Zahkna	Men's sprint	25:26.9	1 (0+1)	44
Rene Zahkna; Kristo Siimer; Mark-Markos Kehva; Jakob Kulbin	Team relay	1:23:48.8	6 (0+6)	13

Women

Athlete	Event	Time	Misses	Rank
Regina Ermits	Women's individual	46:18.6	2 (1+0+1+0)	50
Regina Ermits	Women's sprint	23:50.9	2 (1+1)	69
Susan Külm	Women's individual	44:43.1	1 (0+0+0+1)	28
Susan Külm	Pursuit	32:49.7	2 (1+0+1+0)	22
Susan Külm	Women's sprint	22:43.9	1 (1+0)	37
Johanna Talihärm	Women's individual	49:01.8	3 (3+0+0+0)	75
Johanna Talihärm	Women's sprint	24:43.2	2 (0+2)	82
Tuuli Tomingas	Women's individual	46:45.7	4 (1+1+1+1)	57
Tuuli Tomingas	Pursuit	DNF		
Tuuli Tomingas	Women's sprint	23:14.0	1 (1+0)	57
Susan Külm; Regina Ermits; Tuuli Tomingas; Johanna Talihärm	Team relay	1:15:12.3	12 (0+12)	14

Mixed

Athlete	Event	Time	Misses	Rank
Rene Zahkna; Kristo Siimer; Susan Külm; Regina Ermits	Relay	1:07:45.3	0+5	15

== Cross-country skiing ==
Estonia qualified one female and one male cross-country skier through the basic quota. Following the completion of the 2024–25 FIS Cross-Country World Cup, Estonia qualified a further three female and two male athletes.After reallocation of declined quotas, Estonia qualified one more female athlete.

Distance
Men

Athlete	Event	Classical		Freestyle		Final	
Athlete	Event	Time	Rank	Time	Rank	Time	Rank
Alvar Johannes Alev	Men's 10 km freestyle	—N/a		22:10.2	28	—N/a	
Alvar Johannes Alev	Men's skiathlon	24:43.5	35	24:16.2	38	49:27.7	38
Alvar Johannes Alev	Men's 50 km classical	2:14:47.3	15	—N/a			
Martin Himma	Men's 10 km freestyle	—N/a		22:21.6	36	—N/a	
Martin Himma	Men's 50 km classical	2:21:13.2	29	—N/a			

Women

Athlete	Event	Classical		Freestyle		Final	
Athlete	Event	Time	Rank	Time	Rank	Time	Rank
Kaidy Kaasiku	Women's 10 km freestyle	—N/a		25:56.3	43	—N/a	
Kaidy Kaasiku	Women's skiathlon	31:25.8	48	29:20.8	37	1:01:18.5	43
Kaidy Kaasiku	Women's 50 km classical	2:33:32.0	20	—N/a			
Keidy Kaasiku	Women's 10 km freestyle	—N/a		25:33.7	37	—N/a	
Keidy Kaasiku	Women's skiathlon	32:00.3	51	29:21.3	38	1:01:51.7	47
Keidy Kaasiku	Women's 50 km classical	2:28:54.3	13	—N/a			
Teiloora Ojaste	Women's skiathlon	34:33.2	65	LAP			
Mariel Merlii Pulles	Women's 10 km freestyle	—N/a		26:05.8	50	—N/a	
Teesi Tuul	Women's 10 km freestyle	—N/a		26:38.3	62	—N/a	
Teesi Tuul	Women's 50 km classical	2:39:07.5	30	—N/a			
Kaidy Kaasiku; Keidy Kaasiku; Mariel Merlii Pulles; Teesi Tuul	4 × 7.5 km relay	—N/a				1:21:46.2	13

Sprint

Athlete	Event	Qualification		Quarterfinal		Semifinal		Final	
Athlete	Event	Time	Rank	Time	Rank	Time	Rank	Time	Rank
Karl Sebastian Dremljuga	Men's sprint	3:29.60	59	Did not advance					
Martin Himma	Men's sprint	3:23.64	44	Did not advance					
Teiloora Ojaste	Women's sprint	4:06.40	56	Did not advance					
Mariel Merlii Pulles	Women's sprint	3:52.44	40	Did not advance					
Teesi Tuul	Women's sprint	4:03.73	54	Did not advance					
Karl Sebastian Dremljuga; Martin Himma	Men's team sprint	6:05.36	18	—N/a				Did not advance	
Mariel Merlii Pulles; Keidy Kaasiku	Women's team sprint	7:01.38	13 Q	—N/a				21:34.95	12

== Curling ==
Estonia qualified a mixed doubles pair. This marked the country's debut in the sport at the Winter Olympics.

Summary

Team	Event	Group stage										Semifinal	Final / BM	
Team	Event	Opposition Score	Opposition Score	Opposition Score	Opposition Score	Opposition Score	Opposition Score	Opposition Score	Opposition Score	Opposition Score	Rank	Opposition Score	Opposition Score	Rank
Marie Kaldvee; Harri Lill	Mixed doubles tournament	SUI; L 7–9	GBR; L 5–10	SWE; W 7–5	ITA; L 4–7	NOR; L 5–6	CAN; W 8–6	KOR; L 3–9	USA; L 3–5	CZE; L 4–8	10	Did not advance		

=== Mixed doubles tournament ===
Estonia qualified a mixed doubles team by earning enough points in the last two World Curling Championships. Marie Kaldvee and Harri Lill qualified as Estonian representatives by representing the country at both the 2024 and 2025 World Championships.

Final Round Robin Standings
Team	Athletes	Pld	W	L	W–L	PF	PA	EW	EL	BE	SE	S%	DSC	Qualification
Great Britain	Jennifer Dodds / Bruce Mouat	9	8	1	–	69	46	37	30	0	11	79.6%	20.931	Playoffs
Italy	Stefania Constantini / Amos Mosaner	9	6	3	1–0	60	50	32	31	1	11	78.3%	27.931	Playoffs
United States	Cory Thiesse / Korey Dropkin	9	6	3	0–1	58	45	36	33	0	12	83.1%	25.900	Playoffs
Sweden	Isabella Wranå / Rasmus Wranå	9	5	4	–	62	55	31	34	0	9	80.1%	19.413	Playoffs
Canada	Jocelyn Peterman / Brett Gallant	9	4	5	2–0	58	52	35	31	0	10	78.5%	36.050	
Norway	Kristin Skaslien / Magnus Nedregotten	9	4	5	1–1	52	47	37	33	0	12	77.1%	24.444	
Switzerland	Briar Schwaller-Hürlimann / Yannick Schwaller	9	4	5	0–2	56	67	32	35	0	6	74.5%	24.000	
Czech Republic	Julie Zelingrová / Vít Chabičovský	9	3	6	1–0	45	62	30	34	0	6	69.1%	16.019	
South Korea	Kim Seon-yeong / Jeong Yeong-seok	9	3	6	0–1	47	64	32	34	0	9	75.1%	42.425	
Estonia	Marie Kaldvee / Harri Lill	9	2	7	–	46	65	32	39	0	7	71.6%	19.300	

Source: Official website

Round robin
Estonia had a bye in draws 3, 5, 7, and 12.

Draw 1
Wednesday, 4 February, 19:05

Sheet D	1	2	3	4	5	6	7	8	9	Final
Estonia (Kaldvee / Lill)	0	1	0	0	0	2	0	4	0	7
Switzerland (Schwaller-Hürlimann / Schwaller) 🔨	1	0	2	1	1	0	2	0	2	9

Draw 2
Thursday, 5 February, 10:05

Sheet A	1	2	3	4	5	6	7	8	Final
Great Britain (Dodds / Mouat) 🔨	2	0	2	0	2	0	4	X	10
Estonia (Kaldvee / Lill)	0	2	0	1	0	2	0	X	5

Draw 4
Thursday, 5 February, 19:05

Sheet C	1	2	3	4	5	6	7	8	Final
Estonia (Kaldvee / Lill)	0	3	0	1	1	1	0	1	7
Sweden (Wranå / Wranå) 🔨	1	0	2	0	0	0	2	0	5

Draw 6
Friday, 6 February, 14:35

Sheet B	1	2	3	4	5	6	7	8	Final
Italy (Constantini / Mosaner)	3	1	0	0	2	0	0	1	7
Estonia (Kaldvee / Lill) 🔨	0	0	1	1	0	1	1	0	4

Draw 8
Saturday, 7 February, 14:35

Sheet A	1	2	3	4	5	6	7	8	Final
Estonia (Kaldvee / Lill)	0	0	1	0	2	0	2	0	5
Norway (Skaslien / Nedregotten) 🔨	1	1	0	1	0	2	0	1	6

Draw 9
Saturday, 7 February, 19:05

Sheet B	1	2	3	4	5	6	7	8	Final
Canada (Peterman / Gallant)	0	0	0	2	0	3	0	1	6
Estonia (Kaldvee / Lill) 🔨	3	2	1	0	1	0	1	0	8

Draw 10
Sunday, 8 February, 10:05

Sheet B	1	2	3	4	5	6	7	8	Final
Estonia (Kaldvee / Lill)	0	0	1	0	1	0	1	X	3
South Korea (Kim / Jeong) 🔨	3	2	0	2	0	2	0	X	9

Draw 11
Sunday, 8 February, 14:35

Sheet C	1	2	3	4	5	6	7	8	Final
United States (Thiesse / Dropkin)	0	1	0	1	0	1	1	1	5
Estonia (Kaldvee / Lill) 🔨	1	0	1	0	1	0	0	0	3

Draw 13
Monday, 9 February, 10:05

Sheet D	1	2	3	4	5	6	7	8	Final
Czech Republic (Zelingrová / Chabičovský)	0	1	4	0	0	1	1	1	8
Estonia (Kaldvee / Lill) 🔨	2	0	0	1	1	0	0	0	4

== Figure skating ==
In the 2025 World Figure Skating Championships in Boston, the United States, Estonia secured one quota in each of the men's and women's singles.

Athlete	Event	SP/SD		FP/FD		Total	
Athlete	Event	Points	Rank	Points	Rank	Points	Rank
Aleksandr Selevko	Men's singles	82.02	18 Q	154.80	16	236.82	16
Niina Petrõkina	Women's singles	69.63	10 Q	141.19	6	210.82	7

== Freestyle skiing ==
Park & Pipe

Athlete	Event	Qualification					Final				
Athlete	Event	Run 1	Run 2	Run 3	Best	Rank	Run 1	Run 2	Run 3	Best	Rank
Henry Sildaru	Men's big air	17.00	42.00	80.00	122.00	24	Did not advance				
Henry Sildaru	Men's halfpipe	19.25	88.00	—N/a	88.00	3 Q	24.25	92.75	93.00	93.00	2nd place, silver medalist(s)
Henry Sildaru	Men's slopestyle	43.05	21.70	—N/a	43.05	21	Did not advance				
Grete-Mia Meentalo	Women's halfpipe	61.50	DNI	—N/a	61.50	17	Did not advance				
Kelly Sildaru	Women's halfpipe	69.25	73.75	—N/a	73.75	13	Did not advance				

== Nordic combined ==
Athlete	Event	Ski jumping			Cross-country		Total	
Athlete	Event	Distance	Points	Rank	Time	Rank	Time	Rank
Kristjan Ilves	Individual normal hill/10 km	99.0	132.6	1	30:40.5	8	30:40.5	6
Kristjan Ilves	Individual large hill/10 km	137.0	144.0	6	25:22.4	12	25:46.4	7
Ruubert Teder	Individual normal hill/10 km	90.0	101.3	30	37:25.6	34	39:30.6	34
Ruubert Teder	Individual large hill/10 km	118.0	99.8	33	DNS		DNF	
Ruubert Teder; Kristjan Ilves	Team large hill/2 × 7.5 km	227.0	191.2	10	44:08.7	11	45:22.7	11

== Skeleton ==
Athlete	Event	Run 1		Run 2		Run 3		Run 4		Total	
Athlete	Event	Time	Rank	Time	Rank	Time	Rank	Time	Rank	Time	Rank
Dārta Zunte	Women's	58.88	22	58.71	22	59.10	23	58.78	23	3:55.47	23

== Ski jumping ==
Athlete	Event	First round			Final round			Total	
Athlete	Event	Distance	Points	Rank	Distance	Points	Rank	Points	Rank
Artti Aigro	Men's normal hill	DNS			Did not advance				
Artti Aigro	Men's large hill	124.5	53.7	24 Q	125.5	55.5	27	236.1	26
Kaimar Vagul	Men's normal hill	99.0	119.5	36	Did not advance				
Kaimar Vagul	Men's large hill	125.0	112.4	40	Did not advance				

Athlete	Event	First round			Second round			Final round			Total	
Athlete	Event	Distance	Points	Rank	Distance	Points	Rank	Distance	Points	Rank	Points	Rank
Artti Aigro; Kaimar Vagul	Men's super team large hill	255.0	238.8	13	Did not advance							

== Snowboarding ==
Cross

Athlete	Event	Seeding		1/8 final	Quarterfinal	Semifinal	Final	
Athlete	Event	Time	Rank	Position	Position	Position	Position	Rank
Mai Brit Teder	Women's snowboard cross	1:18.10	30	4	Did not advance			

== Speed skating ==
Estonia qualified one male speed skater through performances at the 2025-26 ISU Speed Skating World Cup.

Athlete	Event	Race	
Athlete	Event	Time	Rank
Marten Liiv	Men's 500 m	34.83	18
Marten Liiv	Men's 1000 m	1:09.06	14
Marten Liiv	Men's 1500 m	1:47.76	27

== See also ==
- Estonia at the Olympics
