= Finland at the 2026 Winter Olympics =

- Flag of Finland
- IOC code: FIN
- NOC: Finnish Olympic Committee
- Website: www.olympiakomitea.fi (in Finnish)

in Milan and Cortina d'Ampezzo, Italy 6 February 2026 – 22 February 2026
- Competitors: 103 (56 men and 47 women) in 9 sports
- Flag bearers (opening): Mikko Lehtonen & Krista Pärmäkoski
- Flag bearer (closing): Iida Karhunen
- Medals Ranked 23rd: Gold 0 Silver 1 Bronze 5 Total 6

Winter Olympics appearances (overview)
- 1924; 1928; 1932; 1936; 1948; 1952; 1956; 1960; 1964; 1968; 1972; 1976; 1980; 1984; 1988; 1992; 1994; 1998; 2002; 2006; 2010; 2014; 2018; 2022; 2026

Finland competed at the 2026 Winter Olympics in Milan and Cortina d'Ampezzo, Italy, from 6 to 22 February 2026.

Hockey player Mikko Lehtonen and cross-country skier Krista Pärmäkoski were the country's flagbearer during the opening ceremony. Meanwhile, figure skater Iida Karhunen was the country's flagbearer during the closing ceremony.

After having rebounded from the 2024 Olympics appearance, Finland won its medals for the first time in four years, securing 1 silver and 5 bronze medals. It also marked the first time since 2010 that the country failed to win a single gold medal at the Winter Games.

== Competitors ==
The following is the list of number of competitors participating at the Games per sport/discipline.

Sport	Men	Women	Total
Alpine skiing	3	3	6
Biathlon	5	5	10
Cross-country skiing	8	8	16
Figure skating	1	2	3
Freestyle skiing	7	1	8
Ice hockey	25	23	48
Nordic combined	3	—N/a	3
Ski jumping	3	4	7
Snowboarding	1	1	2
Total	56	47	103

== Medalists ==
The following Finnish competitors won medals at the games. In the discipline sections below, the medalists' names are bolded.

Medal	Name	Sport	Event	Date
Silver	Eero Hirvonen; Ilkka Herola	Nordic combined	Team large hill/2 x 7.5 km	19 February
Bronze	Eero Hirvonen	Nordic combined	Individual normal hill/10 km	11 February
Bronze	Johanna Matintalo; Kerttu Niskanen; Vilma Ryytty; Jasmi Joensuu	Cross-country skiing	Women's 4 × 7.5 kilometre relay	14 February
Bronze	Suvi Minkkinen	Biathlon	Women's pursuit	15 February
Bronze	Ilkka Herola	Nordic combined	Individual large hill/10 km	17 February
Bronze	Finland men's national ice hockey team: Sebastian Aho; Joel Armia; Mikael Granlund (C); Erik Haula; Miro Heiskanen; Roope Hintz; Henri Jokiharju; Kaapo Kakko; Oliver Kapanen; Joel Kiviranta; Joonas Korpisalo; Kevin Lankinen; Artturi Lehkonen; Mikko Lehtonen; Esa Lindell; Anton Lundell; Eetu Luostarinen; Olli Määttä; Nikolas Matinpalo; Niko Mikkola; Mikko Rantanen; Rasmus Ristolainen; Juuse Saros; Teuvo Teräväinen; Eeli Tolvanen	Ice hockey	Men's tournament	21 February

Medals by date
**Day**	**Date**	1st place, gold medalist(s)	2nd place, silver medalist(s)	3rd place, bronze medalist(s)	Total
5	11 February	0	0	1	1
8	14 February	0	0	1	1
9	15 February	0	0	1	1
11	17 February	0	0	1	1
13	19 February	0	1	0	1
15	21 February	0	0	1	1
Total		0	1	5	6

Medals by sport
Sport	1st place, gold medalist(s)	2nd place, silver medalist(s)	3rd place, bronze medalist(s)	Total
Nordic combined	0	1	2	**3**
Biathlon	0	0	1	**1**
Cross-country skiing	0	0	1	**1**
Ice hockey	0	0	1	**1**
Total	0	1	5	6

Medals by gender
Gender	1st place, gold medalist(s)	2nd place, silver medalist(s)	3rd place, bronze medalist(s)	Total
Male	0	1	3	**4**
Female	0	0	2	**2**
Mixed	0	0	0	**0**
Total	0	1	5	6

Multiple medalists
**Name**	**Sport**	1st place, gold medalist(s)	2nd place, silver medalist(s)	3rd place, bronze medalist(s)	**Total**
Ilkka Herola	Nordic combined	0	1	1	**2**
Eero Hirvonen	Nordic combined	0	1	1	**2**

== Alpine skiing ==
Finland qualified one female and one male alpine skier through the basic quota.

Men

Athlete	Event	Run 1		Run 2		Total	
Athlete	Event	Time	Rank	Time	Rank	Time	Rank
Eduard Hallberg	Giant slalom	DNF					
Eduard Hallberg	Slalom	DNF					
Elian Lehto	Downhill	—N/a				1:53.83	20
Elian Lehto	Super-G	—N/a				1:27.85	25
Jesper Pohjolainen	Giant slalom	1:18.77	30	1:12.10	27	2:30.87	27
Jesper Pohjolainen	Slalom	DNF					
Elian Lehto; Eduard Hallberg	Team combined	1:53.51	13	52.14	5	2:45.65	9

Women

Athlete	Event	Run 1		Run 2		Total	
Athlete	Event	Time	Rank	Time	Rank	Time	Rank
Silja Koskinen	Slalom	50.81	37	54.49	27	1:45.30	29
Rosa Pohjolainen	Downhill	—N/a				1:44.08	28
Rosa Pohjolainen	Slalom	50.25	33	DNF			
Rosa Pohjolainen	Super-G	—N/a				1:29.18	23

== Biathlon ==
Finland qualified five female and five male biathletes through the 2024–25 Biathlon World Cup score.

Men

Athlete	Event	Time	Misses	Rank
Tuomas Harjula	Individual	55:15.0	1 (0+1+0+0)	15
Tuomas Harjula	Mass start	42:16.0	3 (0+0+2+1)	15
Tuomas Harjula	Pursuit	34:16.5	3 (0+0+3+0)	21
Tuomas Harjula	Sprint	24:36.4	1 (0+1)	21
Olli Hiidensalo	Individual	53:01.2	0 (0+0+0+0)	4
Olli Hiidensalo	Mass start	42:09.0	4 (0+1+2+1)	14
Olli Hiidensalo	Pursuit	34:00.3	4 (1+0+2+1)	17
Olli Hiidensalo	Sprint	24:02.4	0 (0+0)	11
Otto Invenius	Individual	54:39.5	1 (1+0+0+0)	11
Otto Invenius	Mass start	41:41.8	5 (0+0+3+2)	9
Otto Invenius	Pursuit	34:18.9	2 (1+0+1+0)	22
Otto Invenius	Sprint	25:20.1	4 (1+3)	40
Tero Seppälä	Individual	58:22.5	6 (2+1+2+1)	51
Tero Seppälä	Mass start	43:10.1	7 (0+3+2+2)	22
Tero Seppälä	Pursuit	33:48.5	4 (1+0+2+1)	15
Tero Seppälä	Sprint	24:34.1	2 (1+1)	18
Olli Hiidensalo; Tero Seppälä; Jimi Klemettinen; Otto Invenius	Team relay	1:22:29.3	12 (2+10)	7

Women

Athlete	Event	Time	Misses	Rank
Inka Hämäläinen	Individual	46:49.5	3 (1+0+2+0)	56
Inka Hämäläinen	Sprint	24:21.4	4 (3+1)	77
Venla Lehtonen	Individual	49:45.5	5 (2+1+1+1)	79
Venla Lehtonen	Sprint	23:36.1	2 (1+1)	63
Sonja Leinamo	Individual	44:44.8	3 (1+2+0+0)	29
Sonja Leinamo	Sprint	23:52.2	5 (3+2)	70
Suvi Minkkinen	Individual	44:16.4	2 (1+1+0+0)	20
Suvi Minkkinen	Mass start	39:05.1	1 (0+0+1+0)	19
Suvi Minkkinen	Pursuit	30:46.1	0 (0+0+0+0)	3rd place, bronze medalist(s)
Suvi Minkkinen	Sprint	21:30.4	0 (0+0)	6
Inka Hämäläinen; Sonja Leinamo; Venla Lehtonen; Suvi Minkkinen	Team relay	1:12.51.4	9 (0+9)	7

Mixed

Athlete	Event	Time	Misses	Rank
Olli Hiidensalo; Tero Seppälä; Inka Hämäläinen; Suvi Minkkinen	Relay	1:06:12.0	7 (0+7)	6

== Cross-country skiing ==
Finland qualified one female and one male cross-country skier through the basic quota. Following the completion of the 2024–25 FIS Cross-Country World Cup, Finland qualified a further seven female and six male athletes. After reallocation of declined quotas, Finland qualified one more male athlete.

Distance
Men

Athlete	Event	Classical		Freestyle		Final		
Athlete	Event	Time	Rank	Time	Rank	Time	Deficit	Rank
Niko Anttola	10 km freestyle	—N/a				22:02.3	1:26.1	25
Niko Anttola	20 km skiathlon	24:06.4	16	23:16.9	19	47:56.0	1:45.0	18
Ristomatti Hakola	20 km skiathlon	25:27.3	45	26:11.2	57	52:11.6	6:00.7	52
Ristomatti Hakola	50 km classical	—N/a				DNS		
Emil Liekari	10 km freestyle	—N/a				22:49.4	2:13.2	47
Joni Mäki	10 km freestyle	—N/a				22:55.1	2:18.9	48
Iivo Niskanen	20 km skiathlon	23:49.7	9	23:32.5	25	47:52.6	1:41.6	17
Iivo Niskanen	50 km classical	—N/a				DNF		
Arsi Ruuskanen	10 km freestyle	—N/a				21:50.6	1:14.4	18
Arsi Ruuskanen	20 km skiathlon	24:05.7	14	22:24.1	5	47:00.9	49.9	11
Arsi Ruuskanen	50 km classical	—N/a				2:10:51.0	4:06.2	7
Lauri Vuorinen	50 km classical	—N/a				2:20:30.1	13:45.3	27
Lauri Vuorinen; Iivo Niskanen; Arsi Ruuskanen; Niko Anttola	4 × 7.5 km relay	32:57.4	2	32:24.2	4	1:05:21.6	57.1	4

Women

Athlete	Event	Classical		Freestyle		Final		
Athlete	Event	Time	Rank	Time	Rank	Time	Deficit	Rank
Johanna Matintalo	50 km classical	—N/a				DNF		
Kerttu Niskanen	10 km freestyle	—N/a				25:09.0	2:19.8	29
Kerttu Niskanen	20 km skiathlon	28:04.2	6	27:04.0	7	55:39.2	1:54.0	5
Kerttu Niskanen	50 km classical	—N/a				2:23:27.2	6:59.0	7
Vilma Nissinen	10 km freestyle	—N/a				25:10.6	2:21.4	30
Vilma Nissinen	20 km skiathlon	29:54.8	34	30:09.8	43	1:00:37.7	6:52.5	40
Krista Pärmäkoski	10 km freestyle	—N/a				24:56.4	2:07.2	25
Krista Pärmäkoski	20 km skiathlon	29:38.6	28	27:40.5	12	57:46.7	4:01.5	20
Krista Pärmäkoski	50 km classical	—N/a				2:33:38.5	17:10.3	21
Vilma Ryytty	10 km freestyle	—N/a				24:40.0	1:50.8	18
Vilma Ryytty	20 km skiathlon	28:42.8	12	28:21.7	24	57:37.3	3:52.1	15
Johanna Matintalo; Kerttu Niskanen; Vilma Ryytty; Jasmi Joensuu	4 × 7.5 km relay	39:11.0	2	37:48.5	3	1:16:59.5	1:14.7	3rd place, bronze medalist(s)

Sprint
Men

Athlete	Event	Qualification		Quarterfinal		Semifinal		Final	
Athlete	Event	Time	Rank	Time	Rank	Time	Rank	Time	Rank
Emil Liekari	Sprint	3:15.01	9 Q	3:29.28	5	Did not advance			
Joni Mäki	Sprint	3:16.15	16 Q	3:31.42	3	Did not advance			
Niilo Moilanen	Sprint	3:19.69	34	Did not advance					
Lauri Vuorinen	Sprint	3:18.28	27 Q	3:28.99	4 Q	3:40.28	2 Q	3:51.39	4
Lauri Vuorinen; Joni Mäki	Men's team sprint	5:53.62	8 Q	—N/a				18:46.67	11

Women

Athlete	Event	Qualification		Quarterfinal		Semifinal		Final	
Athlete	Event	Time	Rank	Time	Rank	Time	Rank	Time	Rank
Jasmi Joensuu	Sprint	3:39.64	4 Q	3:56.59	3	Did not advance			
Jasmin Kähärä	Sprint	3:45.12	13 Q	4:00.49	5	Did not advance			
Johanna Matintalo	Sprint	3:42.80	10 Q	3:55.17	1 Q	4:16.74	6	Did not advance	
Amanda Saari	Sprint	3:45.34	15 Q	4:03.86	5	Did not advance			
Jasmi Joensuu; Jasmin Kähärä	Women's team sprint	6:44.86	2 Q	—N/a				21:13.37	9

== Figure skating ==
In the 2025 World Figure Skating Championships in Boston, the United States, Finland secured one quota in the women's singles, and one quota in the ice dance.

Athlete	Event	SP/SD		FP/FD		Total	
Athlete	Event	Points	Rank	Points	Rank	Points	Rank
Iida Karhunen	Women's singles	65.06	15 Q	127.73	17	192.79	16
Juulia Turkkila; Matthias Versluis	Ice dance	77.96	12 Q	118.07	13	196.03	12

== Freestyle skiing ==
Moguls

Athlete	Event	Qualification								Final							
Athlete	Event	Run 1				Run 2				Run 1				Run 2			
Athlete	Event	Time	Points	Total	Rank	Time	Points	Total	Rank	Time	Points	Total	Rank	Time	Points	Total	Rank
Akseli Ahvenainen	Men's moguls	24.09	55.67	71.25	20	23.00	58.24	75.28	19 Q	26.01	14.49	27.48	20	Did not advance			
Rasmus Karjalainen	Men's moguls	23.40	55.05	71.56	19	23.29	57.99	74.64	21	Did not advance							
Olli Penttala	Men's moguls	23.88	55.88	71.74	18	23.19	48.49	75.28	20 Q	22.21	60.03	78.14	11	Did not advance			
Severi Vierelä	Men's moguls	23.05	54.10	71.08	21	22.99	56.59	73.65	24	Did not advance							

Dual moguls

Athlete	Event	1/16 Final	1/8 Final	Quarterfinal	Semifinal	Final	
Athlete	Event	Opposition Result	Opposition Result	Opposition Result	Opposition Result	Opposition Result	Rank
Akseli Ahvenainen	Men's dual moguls	Wallberg (SWE); L 9-26	Did not advance				29
Rasmus Karjalainen	Men's dual moguls	Page (USA); L 13-22	Did not advance				23
Olli Penttala	Men's dual moguls	Jung (KOR); L 15-20	Did not advance				19
Severi Vierelä	Men's dual moguls	Stegfeldt (SWE); L 13-22	Did not advance				21

Park & Pipe

Athlete	Event	Qualification					Final				
Athlete	Event	Run 1	Run 2	Run 3	Best	Rank	Run 1	Run 2	Run 3	Best	Rank
Kuura Koivisto	Men's big air	78.25	88.25	80.75	169.00	14	Did not advance				
Kuura Koivisto	Men's slopestyle	22.08	63.93	—N/a	63.93	14	Did not advance				
Elias Lajunen	Men's big air	9.00	DNS	DNS	9.00	29	Did not advance				
Elias Lajunen	Men's slopestyle	25.70	48.88	—N/a	48.88	18	Did not advance				
Elias Syrjä	Men's big air	82.25	78.75	85.75	164.50	15	Did not advance				
Elias Syrjä	Men's slopestyle	64.03	61.91	—N/a	64.03	13	Did not advance				
Anni Kärävä	Women's big air	77.75	84.00	DNI	161.75	5 Q	80.50	83.75	DNI	164.25	8
Anni Kärävä	Women's slopestyle	62.91	1.16	—N/a	62.91	6 Q	49.61	13.80	63.51	63.51	8

== Ice hockey ==
Summary

Key:

- OT – Overtime
- GWS – Match decided by penalty-shootout

Team	Event	Group stage					Qualification playoff	Quarterfinal	Semifinal	Final / BM	
Team	Event	Opposition Score	Opposition Score	Opposition Score	Opposition Score	Rank	Opposition Score	Opposition Score	Opposition Score	Opposition Score	Rank
Finland men's	Men's tournament	Slovakia; L 1–4	Sweden; W 4–1	Italy; W 11–0	—N/a	2 Q	Bye	Switzerland; W 3–2 OT	Canada; L 2–3	Slovakia; W 6–1	3rd place, bronze medalist(s)
Finland women's	Women's tournament	United States; L 0–5	Czechia; L 0–2	Switzerland; W 3–1	Canada; L 0–5	4 Q	—N/a	Switzerland; L 0–1	Did not advance		6

=== Men's tournament ===
Finland men's national ice hockey team qualified a team of 25 players by finishing 2nd in the 2023 IIHF World Ranking.

Roster

The first six players of Finland's roster were announced on 16 June 2025. Aleksander Barkov was initially one of the six named to the roster on 16 June 2025, but suffered a torn ACL and MCL during training camp for the 2025–26 NHL season. He was subsequently ruled out for the following seven to nine months, including the Olympics. The final roster was named on 2 January 2026. On 3 February, Ukko-Pekka Luukkonen was ruled out due to injury, and was replaced by Joonas Korpisalo. On 8 February, Mikael Granlund was named Finland's captain, with Sebastian Aho and Mikko Rantanen serving as alternate captains.

Head coach: Antti Pennanen

No.	Pos.	Name	Height	Weight	Birthdate	Team
3	D	Olli Määttä	1.88 m (6 ft 2 in)	94 kg (207 lb)	22 August 1994 (aged 31)	(United States) Utah Mammoth
4	D	Mikko Lehtonen	1.83 m (6 ft 0 in)	89 kg (196 lb)	16 January 1994 (aged 32)	(Switzerland) ZSC Lions
10	D	Henri Jokiharju	1.83 m (6 ft 0 in)	91 kg (201 lb)	17 June 1999 (aged 26)	(United States) Boston Bruins
15	F	Anton Lundell	1.85 m (6 ft 1 in)	89 kg (196 lb)	3 October 2001 (aged 24)	(United States) Florida Panthers
20	F	Sebastian Aho – A	1.83 m (6 ft 0 in)	82 kg (181 lb)	26 July 1997 (aged 28)	(United States) Carolina Hurricanes
23	D	Esa Lindell	1.93 m (6 ft 4 in)	98 kg (216 lb)	23 May 1994 (aged 31)	(United States) Dallas Stars
24	F	Roope Hintz	1.93 m (6 ft 4 in)	97 kg (214 lb)	17 November 1996 (aged 29)	(United States) Dallas Stars
27	F	Eetu Luostarinen	1.93 m (6 ft 4 in)	87 kg (192 lb)	2 September 1998 (aged 27)	(United States) Florida Panthers
28	F	Eeli Tolvanen	1.78 m (5 ft 10 in)	87 kg (192 lb)	22 April 1999 (aged 26)	(United States) Seattle Kraken
32	G	Kevin Lankinen	1.88 m (6 ft 2 in)	90 kg (198 lb)	28 April 1995 (aged 30)	(Canada) Vancouver Canucks
33	D	Nikolas Matinpalo	1.91 m (6 ft 3 in)	97 kg (214 lb)	5 October 1998 (aged 27)	(Canada) Ottawa Senators
40	F	Joel Armia	1.93 m (6 ft 4 in)	98 kg (216 lb)	31 May 1993 (aged 32)	(United States) Los Angeles Kings
41	D	Miro Heiskanen	1.88 m (6 ft 2 in)	89 kg (196 lb)	18 July 1999 (aged 26)	(United States) Dallas Stars
55	D	Rasmus Ristolainen	1.96 m (6 ft 5 in)	94 kg (207 lb)	27 October 1994 (aged 31)	(United States) Philadelphia Flyers
56	F	Erik Haula	1.80 m (5 ft 11 in)	86 kg (190 lb)	23 March 1991 (aged 34)	(United States) Nashville Predators
62	F	Artturi Lehkonen	1.80 m (5 ft 11 in)	81 kg (179 lb)	4 July 1995 (aged 30)	(United States) Colorado Avalanche
64	F	Mikael Granlund – C	1.78 m (5 ft 10 in)	84 kg (185 lb)	26 February 1992 (aged 33)	(United States) Anaheim Ducks
70	G	Joonas Korpisalo	1.93 m (6 ft 4 in)	91 kg (201 lb)	28 April 1994 (aged 31)	(United States) Boston Bruins
74	G	Juuse Saros	1.80 m (5 ft 11 in)	81 kg (179 lb)	19 April 1995 (aged 30)	(United States) Nashville Predators
77	D	Niko Mikkola	2.01 m (6 ft 7 in)	92 kg (203 lb)	27 April 1996 (aged 29)	(United States) Florida Panthers
84	F	Kaapo Kakko	1.85 m (6 ft 1 in)	97 kg (214 lb)	13 February 2001 (aged 24)	(United States) Seattle Kraken
86	F	Teuvo Teräväinen	1.80 m (5 ft 11 in)	86 kg (190 lb)	11 September 1994 (aged 31)	(United States) Chicago Blackhawks
91	F	Oliver Kapanen	1.88 m (6 ft 2 in)	88 kg (194 lb)	29 July 2003 (aged 22)	(Canada) Montreal Canadiens
94	F	Joel Kiviranta	1.80 m (5 ft 11 in)	84 kg (185 lb)	23 March 1996 (aged 29)	(United States) Colorado Avalanche
96	F	Mikko Rantanen – A	1.96 m (6 ft 5 in)	97 kg (214 lb)	29 October 1996 (aged 29)	(United States) Dallas Stars

Group play

Pos	Team	Pld	W	OTW	OTL	L	GF	GA	GD	Pts	Qualification
1	Slovakia	3	2	0	0	1	10	8	+2	6 (Note: Head-to-head points: 3 each. Head-to-head goal difference: Slovakia +1; Finland 0; Sweden −1.)	Advance to quarterfinals
2	Finland	3	2	0	0	1	16	5	+11	6	Advance to quarterfinals
3	Sweden	3	2	0	0	1	11	9	+2	6	Advance to qualification playoffs
4	Italy (H)	3	0	0	0	3	4	19	−15	0	Advance to qualification playoffs

Source: IIHF
Rules for classification: Tiebreak criteria
(H) Host
Notes:

11 February 2026; 16:40	Slovakia	4–1 (1–0, 0–1, 3–0)	Finland	PalaItalia, Milan; Attendance: 11,025

Game reference

Samuel Hlavaj
Goalies
Juuse Saros
Referees:
(Canada) Eric Furlatt
(United States) Sean MacFarlane
Linesmen:
(United States) Ryan Daisy
(Canada) Tarrington Wyonzek

Slafkovský – 07:45	1–0
	1–1	24:15 – Tolvanen (Armia, Lehkonen)
Dvorský (Gernát, Liška) – 47:20	2–1
Slafkovský (Nemec, Dvorský) (PP) – 50:30	3–1
Ružička (Tatar, Slafkovský) (EN) – 57:39	4–1

4 min
Penalties
4 min
25
Shots
40

13 February 2026; 12:10	Finland	4–1 (2–0, 1–1, 1–0)	Sweden	PalaItalia, Milan; Attendance: 11,336

Game reference

Juuse Saros
Goalies
Filip Gustavsson
Referees:
(Canada) Gord Dwyer
(United States) Chris Rooney
Linesmen:
(Canada) Scott Cherrey
(United States) Jake Davis

Matinpalo (Kakko, Määttä) – 07:44	1–0
Lundell (Luostarinen, Mikkola) – 15:29	2–0
	2–1	24:39 – Dahlin (Nylander, Raymond)
Armia (Haula, Lindell) (SH) – 32:47	3–1
Rantanen (Granlund, Hintz) (EN) – 59:25	4–1

18 min
Penalties
14 min
24
Shots
35

14 February 2026; 16:40	Finland	11–0 (3–0, 3–0, 5–0)	Italy	PalaItalia, Milan; Attendance: 11,508

Game reference

Juuse Saros
Goalies
Damian Clara
Davide Fadani
Referees:
(Sweden) Christopher Holm
(Canada) Wes McCauley
Linesmen:
(Denmark) Albert Ankerstjerne
(Canada) Matt MacPherson

Aho (Rantanen, Lehkonen) – 06:49	1–0
Granlund (Rantanen, Heiskanen) (PP) – 09:31	2–0
Kakko (Mikkola, Ristolainen) – 10:18	3–0
Kiviranta (Mikkola, Ristolainen) – 24:04	4–0
Kakko (Luostarinen) – 27:39	5–0
Granlund (Kakko, Luostarinen) – 37:36	6–0
Heiskanen (Rantanen, Aho) (PP) – 41:01	7–0
Lehkonen (Teräväinen) – 41:34	8–0
Aho (Lehkonen, Jokiharju) – 43:43	9–0
Armia (Haula) – 53:26	10–0
Kiviranta (Armia, Haula) – 57:13	11–0

0 min
Penalties
8 min
62
Shots
15

Quarterfinals

18 February 2026; 18:10	Finland	3–2 OT (0–2, 0–0, 2–0) (OT: 1–0)	Switzerland	Fiera Milano, Milan; Attendance: 3,090

Game reference

Juuse Saros
Goalies
Leonardo Genoni
Referees:
(Canada) Michael Campbell
(Canada) Gord Dwyer
Linesmen:
(United States) Ryan Daisy
(Czech Republic) Libor Suchánek

	0–1	14:14 – Riat (Jäger)
	0–2	15:26 – Niederreiter (Suter, Kurashev)
Aho (Luostarinen, Lindell) – 53:54	1–2
Heiskanen (Hintz, Rantanen) (EA) – 58:48	2–2
Lehkonen (Lundell, Lindell) – 63:23	3–2

4 min
Penalties
4 min
31
Shots
23

Semifinal

20 February 2026; 16:40	Canada	3–2 (0–1, 1–1, 2–0)	Finland	PalaItalia, Milan; Attendance: 11,155

Game reference

Jordan Binnington
Goalies
Juuse Saros
Referees:
(Canada) Eric Furlatt
(Canada) Dan O'Rourke
Linesmen:
(Denmark) Albert Ankerstjerne
(United States) Ryan Daisy

	0–1	16:55 – Rantanen (Aho) (PP)
	0–2	23:26 – Haula (Armia) (SH)
Reinhart (Makar, McDavid) (PP) – 34:20	1–2
Theodore (Sanheim, Wilson) – 50:34	2–2
MacKinnon (McDavid, Celebrini) (PP) – 59:24	3–2

4 min
Penalties
8 min
39
Shots
17

Bronze medal match

21 February 2026; 20:40	Slovakia	1–6 (0–1, 1–1, 0–4)	Finland	PalaItalia, Milan; Attendance: 10,522

Game reference

Samuel Hlavaj
Goalies
Juuse Saros
Referees:
(Canada) Michael Campbell
(Sweden) Michael Holm
Linesmen:
(Czech Republic) Daniel Hynek
(Czech Republic) Libor Suchánek

	0–1	07:27 – Aho (Lehkonen, Heiskanen)
	0–2	28:05 – Haula (Armia, Tolvanen)
Tatar (Fehérváry) – 39:30	1–2
	1–3	48:27 – Hintz (Heiskanen, Tolvanen) (PP)
	1–4	49:09 – Kakko
	1–5	55:32 – Armia (Hintz) (EN)
	1–6	58:42 – Haula (Armia, Ristolainen) (EN)

6 min
Penalties
4 min
31
Shots
35

=== Women's tournament ===
Finland women's national ice hockey team qualified a team of 23 players by finishing 3rd in the 2024 IIHF World Ranking.

Roster

The roster was announced on 2 January 2026.

Head coach: Tero Lehterä

No.	Pos.	Name	Height	Weight	Birthdate	Team
1	G	Sanni Ahola	1.71 m (5 ft 7 in)	81 kg (179 lb)	3 June 2000 (aged 25)	(Canada) Ottawa Charge
2	D	Sini Karjalainen	1.75 m (5 ft 9 in)	73 kg (161 lb)	30 January 1999 (aged 27)	(Sweden) Skellefteå AIK
5	D	Siiri Yrjölä	1.66 m (5 ft 5 in)	70 kg (150 lb)	8 September 2004 (aged 21)	(United States) St. Cloud State Huskies
6	D	Jenni Hiirikoski	1.62 m (5 ft 4 in)	62 kg (137 lb)	30 March 1987 (aged 38)	(Sweden) Luleå HF
7	D	Sanni Rantala	1.73 m (5 ft 8 in)	64 kg (141 lb)	8 July 2002 (aged 23)	(Sweden) Frölunda HC
8	D	Elli Suoranta	1.68 m (5 ft 6 in)	75 kg (165 lb)	17 June 2002 (aged 23)	(Finland) Ilves Tampere
9	D	Nelli Laitinen – A	1.69 m (5 ft 7 in)	62 kg (137 lb)	29 April 2002 (aged 23)	(United States) Minnesota Golden Gophers
10	F	Elisa Holopainen	1.66 m (5 ft 5 in)	58 kg (128 lb)	27 December 2001 (aged 24)	(Sweden) Frölunda HC
12	F	Sanni Vanhanen	1.68 m (5 ft 6 in)	65 kg (143 lb)	1 July 2005 (aged 20)	(United States) Ohio State Buckeyes
16	F	Petra Nieminen	1.69 m (5 ft 7 in)	71 kg (157 lb)	4 May 1999 (aged 26)	(Sweden) Luleå HF
18	F	Jenniina Nylund	1.71 m (5 ft 7 in)	62 kg (137 lb)	18 June 1999 (aged 26)	(Sweden) Brynäs IF
19	F	Ida Kuoppala	1.68 m (5 ft 6 in)	80 kg (180 lb)	17 February 2000 (aged 25)	(Sweden) Skellefteå AIK
22	F	Julia Schalin	1.60 m (5 ft 3 in)	65 kg (143 lb)	31 August 2005 (aged 20)	(United States) Mercyhurst Lakers
24	F	Viivi Vainikka	1.66 m (5 ft 5 in)	63 kg (139 lb)	23 December 2001 (aged 24)	(Sweden) Brynäs IF
30	G	Emilia Kyrkkö	1.69 m (5 ft 7 in)	74 kg (163 lb)	24 February 2004 (aged 21)	(United States) St. Cloud State Huskies
32	F	Emilia Vesa	1.77 m (5 ft 10 in)	67 kg (148 lb)	3 January 2001 (aged 25)	(Sweden) Frölunda HC
33	F	Michelle Karvinen – C	1.66 m (5 ft 5 in)	65 kg (143 lb)	27 March 1990 (aged 35)	(Canada) Vancouver Goldeneyes
36	G	Anni Keisala	1.75 m (5 ft 9 in)	80 kg (180 lb)	5 April 1997 (aged 28)	(Finland) HPK Hämeenlinna
40	F	Noora Tulus	1.65 m (5 ft 5 in)	65 kg (143 lb)	15 August 1995 (aged 30)	(Sweden) Brynäs IF
61	F	Emma Nuutinen	1.77 m (5 ft 10 in)	75 kg (165 lb)	7 December 1996 (aged 29)	(Finland) Kiekko-Espoo
77	F	Susanna Tapani	1.77 m (5 ft 10 in)	70 kg (150 lb)	2 March 1993 (aged 32)	(United States) Boston Fleet
88	D	Ronja Savolainen – A	1.77 m (5 ft 10 in)	75 kg (165 lb)	29 November 1997 (aged 28)	(Canada) Ottawa Charge
91	F	Julia Liikala	1.66 m (5 ft 5 in)	62 kg (137 lb)	20 March 2001 (aged 24)	(Switzerland) HC Ambrì-Piotta

Group play

Pos	Team	Pld	W	OTW	OTL	L	GF	GA	GD	Pts	Qualification
1	United States	4	4	0	0	0	20	1	+19	12	Quarter-finals
2	Canada	4	3	0	0	1	14	6	+8	9	Quarter-finals
3	Czechia	4	1	0	1	2	7	14	−7	4	Quarter-finals
4	Finland	4	1	0	0	3	3	13	−10	3	Quarter-finals
5	Switzerland	4	0	1	0	3	5	15	−10	2	Quarter-finals

Source: IIHF

7 February 2026; 16:40 v	United States	5–0 (1–0, 3–0, 1–0)	Finland	Fiera Milano, Milan; Attendance: 3,843

Game reference

Aerin Frankel
Goalies
Sanni Ahola
Referees:
(Sweden) Ida Henriksson
(Canada) Elizabeth Mantha
Linesmen:
(United States) Jennifer Cameron
(Canada) Justine Todd

Carpenter (Edwards, Keller) (PP) – 15:19	1–0
Heise (Murphy, Curl-Salemme) – 22:31	2–0
Keller – 23:37	3–0
Knight (Edwards, Keller) (PP) – 29:17	4–0
Murphy (Curl-Salemme, Harvey) – 55:56	5–0

0 min
Penalties
12 min
49
Shots
11

8 February 2026; 21:10 v	Czechia	2–0 (2–0, 0–0, 0–0)	Finland	Fiera Milano, Milan; Attendance: 3,805

Game reference
Klára Peslarová	Goalies	Anni Keisala	Referees: (Canada) Cianna Murray (United States) Amanda Tassoni; Linesmen: (Canada) Kirsten Welsh (Canada) Erin Zach
Pištěková (Juříčková) – 02:57 / 1–0; Mlýnková (Trnková) – 17:54 / 2–0			Referees: (Canada) Cianna Murray (United States) Amanda Tassoni; Linesmen: (Canada) Kirsten Welsh (Canada) Erin Zach
6 min	Penalties	6 min	Referees: (Canada) Cianna Murray (United States) Amanda Tassoni; Linesmen: (Canada) Kirsten Welsh (Canada) Erin Zach
24	Shots	25	Referees: (Canada) Cianna Murray (United States) Amanda Tassoni; Linesmen: (Canada) Kirsten Welsh (Canada) Erin Zach

10 February 2026; 21:10 v	Finland	3–1 (0–0, 3–1, 0–0)	Switzerland	Fiera Milano, Milan; Attendance: 3,790

Game reference

Sanni Ahola
Goalies
Saskia Maurer
Referees:
(United States) Samantha Hiller
(Canada) Elizabeth Mantha
Linesmen:
(Canada) Justine Todd
(Canada) Kirsten Welsh

Vainikka (Vanhanen, Nieminen) (PP) – 23:33	1–0
Liikala (Nylund, Vesa) – 29:50	2–0
	2–1	37:00 – Müller (SH)
Vanhanen (Karvinen, Schalin) (PP) – 37:35	3–1

2 min
Penalties
10 min
31
Shots
15

12 February 2026 (Note: The Finland v Canada match, originally scheduled on 5 February 2026, 21:10, was postponed to 12 February 2026, 14:30, due to cases of norovirus in the Finnish team.); 14:30 v	Finland	0–5 (0–1, 0–2, 0–2)	Canada	Fiera Milano, Milan; Attendance: 3,826

Game reference

Sanni Ahola
Goalies
Ann-Renée Desbiens
Referees:
(United States) Kelly Cooke
(United States) Melissa Doyle
Linesmen:
(Czech Republic) Kristýna Hájková
(Sweden) Jessica Lundgren

0–1	15:12 – Gardiner (Gosling, O'Neill)
0–2	31:38 – Watts (Fillier, Jaques)
0–3	33:40 – O'Neill (Shelton, Gosling)
0–4	41:22 – Clark (Turnbull, Stacey)
0–5	52:29 – Clark (Stacey)

0 min
Penalties
0 min
17
Shots
23

Quarterfinals

14 February 2026; 21:10 v	Finland	0–1 (0–0, 0–1, 0–0)	Switzerland	Fiera Milano, Milan; Attendance: 3,686

Game reference
Sanni Ahola	Goalies	Andrea Brändli	Referees: (United States) Samantha Hiller (Canada) Elizabeth Mantha; Linesmen: (Canada) Alexandra Clarke (Canada) Laura Gutauskas
0–1 / 34:17 – Müller (Enzler, Stalder)			Referees: (United States) Samantha Hiller (Canada) Elizabeth Mantha; Linesmen: (Canada) Alexandra Clarke (Canada) Laura Gutauskas
6 min	Penalties	6 min	Referees: (United States) Samantha Hiller (Canada) Elizabeth Mantha; Linesmen: (Canada) Alexandra Clarke (Canada) Laura Gutauskas
40	Shots	14	Referees: (United States) Samantha Hiller (Canada) Elizabeth Mantha; Linesmen: (Canada) Alexandra Clarke (Canada) Laura Gutauskas

== Nordic combined ==
Athlete	Event	Ski jumping			Cross-country		Total	
Athlete	Event	Distance	Points	Rank	Time	Rank	Time	Rank
Ilkka Herola	Individual normal hill/10 km	98.5	124.6	9	29:49.5	5	30:21:5	5
Ilkka Herola	Individual large hill/10 km	130.5	141.9	7	24:27.8	2	24:59.8	3rd place, bronze medalist(s)
Eero Hirvonen	Individual normal hill/10 km	96.0	123.5	10	29:25.9	1	30:01.9	3rd place, bronze medalist(s)
Eero Hirvonen	Individual large hill/10 km	132.5	139.3	8	24:48.5	6	25:31.5	5
Wille Karhumaa	Individual normal hill/10 km	94.5	112.9	21	32:47.9	22	34:06.9	21
Wille Karhumaa	Individual large hill/10 km	127.5	129.5	13	26:06.8	18	27:28.8	16
Ilkka Herola; Eero Hirvonen	Team large hill/2 × 7.5 km	244.0	226.3	4	40:51.5	1	41:18.5	2nd place, silver medalist(s)

== Ski jumping ==
Men

Athlete	Event	First round			Second round			Final round			Total	
Athlete	Event	Distance	Points	Rank	Distance	Points	Rank	Distance	Points	Rank	Points	Rank
Antti Aalto	Normal hill	100.5	124.8	=20 Q	—N/a			102.0	125.6	23	250.4	25
Antti Aalto	Large hill	131.0	136.1	9 Q	—N/a			133.0	135.2	12	271.3	11
Niko Kytösaho	Normal hill	101.5	124.0	=25 Q	—N/a			101.0	126.9	18	250.9	24
Niko Kytösaho	Large hill	127.0	127.6	18 Q	—N/a			136.5	129.2	16	256.8	18
Vilho Palosaari	Normal hill	100.5	124.4	23 Q	—N/a			103.0	132.6	6	257.0	14
Vilho Palosaari	Large hill	131.0	124.1	23 Q	—N/a			130.5	121.7	22	245.8	23
Antti Aalto; Niko Kytösaho	Super team large hill	265.0	258.9	8 Q	258.5	252.1	10	Did not advance			511.0	9

Women

Athlete	Event	First round			Final round			Total	
Athlete	Event	Distance	Points	Rank	Distance	Points	Rank	Points	Rank
Heta Hirvonen	Normal hill	94.5	111.6	25	94.0	107.6	24	219.2	25
Heta Hirvonen	Large hill	120.5	104.1	27	114.0	109.3	21	213.4	24
Minja Korhonen	Normal hill	91.5	107.8	31	Did not advance				
Minja Korhonen	Large hill	115.0	90.6	37	Did not advance				
Sofia Mattila	Normal hill	86.0	93.0	44	Did not advance				
Sofia Mattila	Large hill	109.0	86.2	40	Did not advance				
Jenny Rautionaho	Normal hill	92.0	105.6	37	Did not advance				
Jenny Rautionaho	Large hill	118.5	120.4	10	121.5	119.5	15	239.9	12

Mixed

Athlete	Event	First round			Final			Total	
Athlete	Event	Distance	Points	Rank	Distance	Points	Rank	Points	Rank
Heta Hirvonen; Vilho Palosaari; Jenny Rautionaho; Niko Kytösaho	Mixed team	381.0	458.5	8	381.0	479.5	6	938.0	6

== Snowboarding ==
Park & Pipe

Athlete	Event	Qualification					Final				
Athlete	Event	Run 1	Run 2	Run 3	Best	Rank	Run 1	Run 2	Run 3	Best	Rank
Rene Rinnekangas	Men's big air	62.75	DNI	47.50	110.25	26	Did not advance				
Rene Rinnekangas	Men's slopestyle	46.23	34.60	—N/a	46.23	20	Did not advance				
Eveliina Taka	Women's big air	75.75	63.75	79.50	143.25	18	Did not advance				
Eveliina Taka	Women's slopestyle	57.98	39.03	—N/a	57.98	15	Did not advance				

== See also ==
- Finland at the 2026 Winter Paralympics
