= Maël Tyrode =

French Nordic combined skier (born 2000)

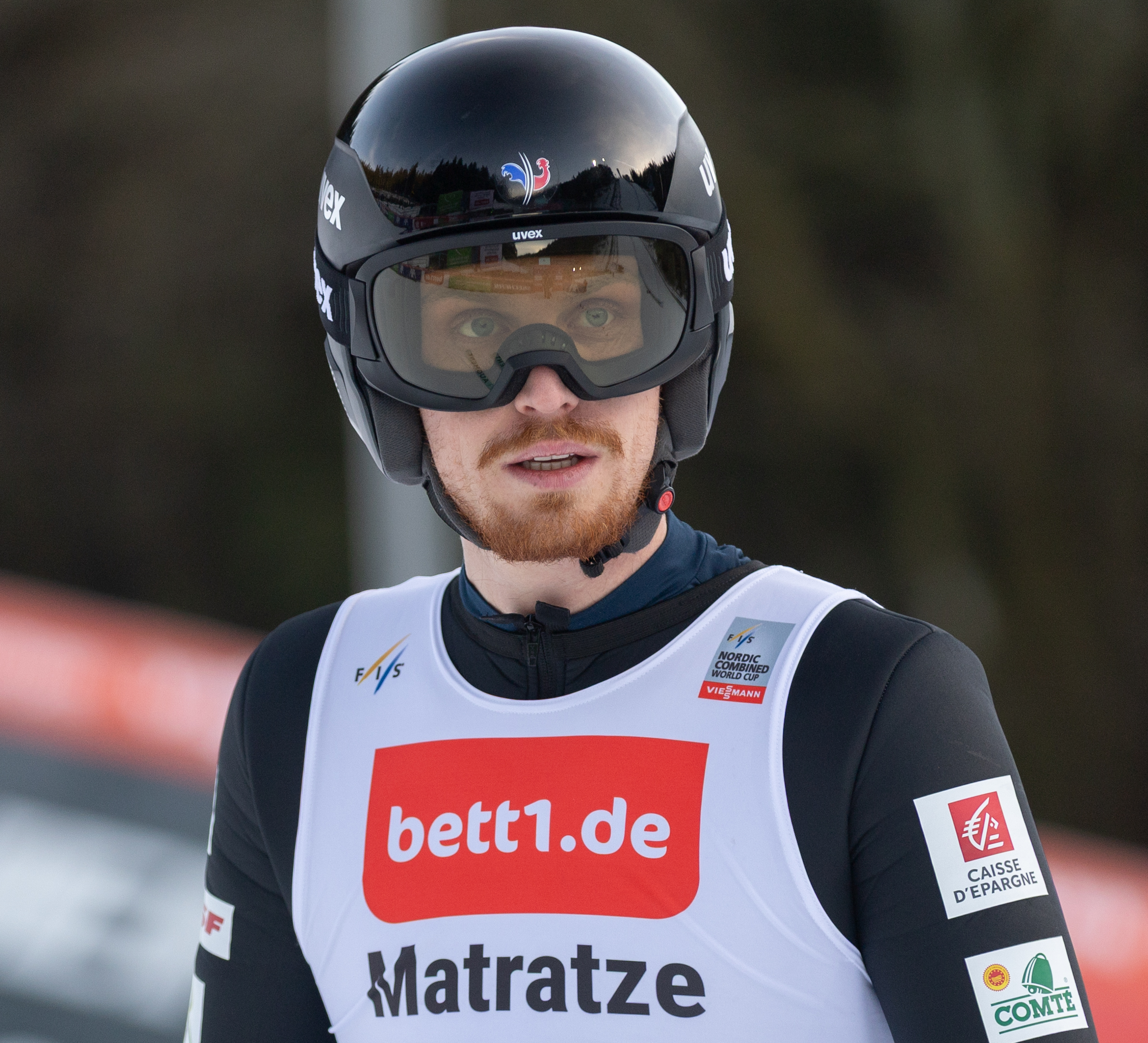
- Tyrode in 2026

Personal information
- Nationality: France
- Born: 31 July 2000 (age 25) Pontarlier, France

Sport
- Sport: Skiing

World Cup career
- Seasons: 3 – (2024–present)
- Indiv. starts: 25
- Team starts: 1
Medal record
Men's Nordic combined
Representing France
Junior World Championships
Silver medal – second place	2017 Park City	Team NH
Silver medal – second place	2020 Oberwiesenthal	Team NH

Maël Tyrode (born 31 July 2000) is a French Nordic combined skier. He represented France at the 2026 Winter Olympics.

== Career ==
In January 2026, the Nordic combined group announced the Netherlands returned their quota, and the quota was allocated to France. Tyrode was the third and final Nordic combined skier selected to represent France at the 2026 Winter Olympics, along with Laurent Muhlethaler, and Marco Heinis. On 11 February 2026, he competed in the individual normal hill and finished in 25th place. On 17 February, he competed in the individual large hill and finished in 17th place.
