= 2026 Winter Olympics medal table =

2026 Winter Olympics medals
- World map showing the medal achievements of each country during the 2026 Winter Olympics. Legend: represents countries that won at least one gold medal represents countries that won at least one silver medal but no gold medals. represents countries that won only at least one bronze medal. represents countries that competed but did not win any medals.
- Location: Milan & Cortina d'Ampezzo, Italy

Highlights
- Most gold medals: Norway (18)
- Most total medals: Norway (41)
- Medalling NOCs: 29

The 2026 Winter Olympics, officially known as the XXV Winter Olympic Games, were an international winter multi-sport event held in Milan and Cortina d'Ampezzo, Italy, from 6 to 22 February. A total of 2,900 athletes representing 92 National Olympic Committees (NOCs) participated, including first-time entrants Benin, Guinea-Bissau, and the United Arab Emirates. The games featured 116 events in eight sports across 16 disciplines, including ski mountaineering, which made its Olympic debut.

Athletes representing 29 NOCs received at least one medal, with 19 winning at least one gold medal. Athletes from Norway won the most medals overall, with 41, surpassing the previous record of 39 medals set by Norway at the 2018 Winter Olympics. Norwegian athletes also won the most gold medals with 18, breaking the previous record of 16 golds set by the Norwegians at the 2022 Winter Olympics.

Brazil won the first medal and first gold medal in their Winter Olympic history. It is also the first tropical, Latin American and South American National Olympic Committee to win a medal at the Winter Olympics. Georgia also won the first medal in their Winter Olympic history.

Among individual participants, Norwegian cross-country skier Johannes Høsflot Klæbo won the most gold and overall medals, with six medals (all gold). In doing so, he set the record for the most gold medals won at a single Winter Olympics and most career gold medals won by a Winter Olympic athlete (11 gold medals total). Among Winter Olympians, Klaebo's 13 overall medals trails only biathlete Ole Einar Bjørndalen and cross-country skier Marit Bjørgen, the latter of whom holds the record with 15 medals.

== Medals ==
The official medals of the Games were unveiled in Venice, designed as two halves that symbolise the culmination of an athlete's journey and of all those who have walked beside them along the way. The medals were created by the Istituto Poligrafico e Zecca dello Stato (IPZS). They have an essential design that places emotion and teamwork at its core. They feature the traditional Olympic five-ring symbol on one side with an inscription on the reverse that details the event and commemorates the two host cities.

== Medal table ==
The medal table is based on information provided by the International Olympic Committee (IOC) and is consistent with IOC conventional sorting in its published medal tables. The table uses the Olympic medal table sorting method. By default, the table is ordered by the number of gold medals the athletes from a nation have won, where a nation is an entity represented by a NOC. The number of silver medals is taken into consideration next and then the number of bronze medals. If teams are still tied, equal ranking is given and they are listed alphabetically by their IOC country code.

* Host nation (Italy)

2026 Winter Olympics medal table (Note: Although the IOC does not include Individual Neutral Athletes in the official medal tables, they are listed here for comparison and historical purposes.)
Rank	NOC	Gold	Silver	Bronze	Total
1	Norway	18	12	11	41
2	United States	12	12	9	33
3	Netherlands	10	7	3	20
4	Italy*	10	6	14	30
5	Germany	8	10	8	26
6	France	8	9	6	23
7	Sweden	8	6	4	18
8	Switzerland	6	9	8	23
9	Austria	5	8	5	18
10	Japan	5	7	12	24
11	Canada	5	7	9	21
12	China	5	4	6	15
13	South Korea	3	4	3	10
14	Australia	3	2	1	6
15	Great Britain	3	1	1	5
16	Czech Republic	2	2	1	5
17	Slovenia	2	1	1	4
18	Spain	1	0	2	3
19	Brazil	1	0	0	1
19	Kazakhstan	1	0	0	1
21	Poland	0	3	1	4
22	New Zealand	0	2	1	3
23	Finland	0	1	5	6
24	Latvia	0	1	1	2
25	Denmark	0	1	0	1
25	Estonia	0	1	0	1
25	Georgia	0	1	0	1
–	Individual Neutral Athletes (Note: Individual Neutral Athletes is the name used to represent approved individual Belarusian and Russian athletes at the 2026 Winter Olympics, after the IOC suspended the Russian Olympic Committee and Belarus Olympic Committee due to the Russian invasion of Ukraine. The IOC country code is AIN, after the French name Athlètes Individuels Neutres.)	0	1	0	1
28	Bulgaria	0	0	2	2
29	Belgium	0	0	1	1
Totals (29 entries)		116	118	115	349

=== Shared medals ===
The following events featured a tie in the medal positions and therefore saw shared medals:

1. Alpine skiing – Men's team combined – Shared silver between Austria and Switzerland; no bronze awarded
2. Ski jumping – Men's normal hill individual – Shared bronze between Japan and Switzerland
3. Alpine skiing – Women's giant slalom – Shared silver between Norway and Sweden (Sara Hector and Thea Louise Stjernesund had identical times in both runs); no bronze awarded

== See also ==
- 2026 Winter Paralympics medal table
- List of 2026 Winter Olympics medal winners
