= Norway at the 2026 Winter Olympics =

- Flag of Norway
- IOC code: NOR
- NOC: Norwegian Olympic and Paralympic Committee and Confederation of Sports
- Website: www.teamnor.no (in Norwegian)

in Milan and Cortina d'Ampezzo, Italy 6 February 2026 – 22 February 2026
- Competitors: 80 (49 men and 31 women) in 10 sports
- Flag bearers (opening): Peder Kongshaug & Kajsa Vickhoff Lie
- Flag bearers (closing): Johannes Høsflot Klæbo & Aurora Grinden Løvås
- Medals Ranked 1st: Gold 18 Silver 12 Bronze 11 Total 41

Winter Olympics appearances (overview)
- 1924; 1928; 1932; 1936; 1948; 1952; 1956; 1960; 1964; 1968; 1972; 1976; 1980; 1984; 1988; 1992; 1994; 1998; 2002; 2006; 2010; 2014; 2018; 2022; 2026

Norway competed at the 2026 Winter Olympics in Milan and Cortina d'Ampezzo, Italy, from 6 to 22 February 2026.

Two days before the closing ceremony, Norway won its 17th gold medal, thus breaking the record for the most gold medals won at a single Winter Olympics. The previous record was 16, also set by Norway, at the 2022 Winter Olympics. Meanwhile, Johannes Høsflot Klæbo and Aurora Grinden Løvås were the country's flagbearer during the closing ceremony.

== Competitors ==
The following is the list of number of competitors participating at the Games per sport/discipline.

Sport	Men	Women	Total
Alpine skiing	10	6	16
Biathlon	6	5	11
Cross-country skiing	7	8	15
Curling	6	1	7
Freestyle skiing	4	1	5
Nordic combined	3	0	3
Ski jumping	3	4	7
Ski mountaineering	2	1	3
Snowboarding	3	0	3
Speed skating	5	5	10
Total	49	31	80

== Medalists ==
The following Norwegian competitors won medals at the Games. In the discipline sections below, the medalists' names are bolded.

Medal	Name	Sport	Event	Date
Gold	Anna Odine Strøm	Ski jumping	Women's normal hill individual	7 February
Gold	Johannes Høsflot Klæbo	Cross-country skiing	Men's 20 km skiathlon	8 February
Gold	Sander Eitrem	Speed skating	Men's 5000 metres	8 February
Gold	Johannes Høsflot Klæbo	Cross-country skiing	Men's sprint	10 February
Gold	Birk Ruud	Freestyle skiing	Men's slopestyle	10 February
Gold	Johan-Olav Botn	Biathlon	Men's 20 km individual	10 February
Gold	Jens Lurås Oftebro	Nordic combined	Individual normal hill/10 km	11 February
Gold	Johannes Høsflot Klæbo	Cross-country skiing	Men's 10 km freestyle	13 February
Gold	Kristin Austgulen Fosnæs; Astrid Øyre Slind; Karoline Simpson-Larsen; Heidi Weng	Cross-country skiing	Women's 4 × 7.5 kilometre relay	14 February
Gold	Maren Kirkeeide	Biathlon	Women's sprint	14 February
Gold	Emil Iversen; Martin Løwstrøm Nyenget; Einar Hedegart; Johannes Høsflot Klæbo	Cross-country skiing	Men's 4 × 7.5 km relay	15 February
Gold	Anna Odine Strøm	Ski jumping	Women's large hill individual	15 February
Gold	Jens Lurås Oftebro	Nordic combined	Individual large hill/10 km	17 February
Gold	Tormod Frostad	Freestyle skiing	Men's big air	17 February
Gold	Einar Hedegart; Johannes Høsflot Klæbo	Cross-country skiing	Men's team sprint	18 February
Gold	Andreas Skoglund; Jens Lurås Oftebro	Nordic combined	Team large hill/2 x 7.5 km	19 February
Gold	Johannes Dale-Skjevdal	Biathlon	Men's mass start	20 February
Gold	Johannes Høsflot Klæbo	Cross-country skiing	Men's 50 km classical	21 February
Silver	Ragne Wiklund	Speed skating	Women's 3000 metres	7 February
Silver	Anna Odine Strøm; Kristoffer Eriksen Sundal; Eirin Maria Kvandal; Marius Lindvik	Ski jumping	Mixed normal hill team	10 February
Silver	Vetle Sjåstad Christiansen	Biathlon	Men's sprint	13 February
Silver	Thea Louise Stjernesund	Alpine skiing	Women's giant slalom	15 February
Silver	Sturla Holm Lægreid	Biathlon	Men's pursuit	15 February
Silver	Maren Kirkeeide	Biathlon	Women's pursuit	15 February
Silver	Eirin Maria Kvandal	Ski jumping	Women's large hill individual	15 February
Silver	Johan-Olav Botn; Vetle Sjåstad Christiansen; Sturla Holm Lægreid; Martin Uldal	Biathlon	Men's relay	17 February
Silver	Sturla Holm Lægreid	Biathlon	Men's mass start	20 February
Silver	Ragne Wiklund	Speed skating	Women's 1500 metres	20 February
Silver	Martin Løwstrøm Nyenget	Cross-country skiing	Men's 50 km classical	21 February
Silver	Heidi Weng	Cross-country skiing	Women's 50 km classical	22 February
Bronze	Heidi Weng	Cross-country skiing	Women's 20 km skiathlon	7 February
Bronze	Martin Løwstrøm Nyenget	Cross-country skiing	Men's 20 km skiathlon	8 February
Bronze	Oskar Opstad Vike	Cross-country skiing	Men's sprint	10 February
Bronze	Sturla Holm Lægreid	Biathlon	Men's 20 km individual	10 February
Bronze	Ragne Wiklund	Speed skating	Women's 5000 metres	12 February
Bronze	Einar Hedegart	Cross-country skiing	Men's 10 km freestyle	13 February
Bronze	Sturla Holm Lægreid	Biathlon	Men's sprint	13 February
Bronze	Henrik Kristoffersen	Alpine skiing	Men's slalom	16 February
Bronze	Johann André Forfang; Kristoffer Eriksen Sundal	Ski jumping	Men's large hill super team	16 February
Bronze	Marthe Kråkstad Johansen; Juni Arnekleiv; Karoline Offigstad Knotten; Maren Kirkeeide	Biathlon	Women's relay	18 February
Bronze	Emil Iversen	Cross-country skiing	Men's 50 km classical	21 February

Medals by date
**Day**	**Date**	1st place, gold medalist(s)	2nd place, silver medalist(s)	3rd place, bronze medalist(s)	Total
1	7 February	1	1	1	3
2	8 February	2	0	1	3
3	9 February	0	0	0	0
4	10 February	3	1	2	6
5	11 February	1	0	0	1
6	12 February	0	0	1	1
7	13 February	1	1	2	4
8	14 February	2	0	0	2
9	15 February	2	4	0	6
10	16 February	0	0	2	2
11	17 February	2	1	0	3
12	18 February	1	0	1	2
13	19 February	1	0	0	1
14	20 February	1	2	0	3
15	21 February	1	1	1	3
16	22 February	0	1	0	1
Total		18	12	11	41

Medals by sport
Sport	1st place, gold medalist(s)	2nd place, silver medalist(s)	3rd place, bronze medalist(s)	Total
Cross-country skiing	7	2	5	**14**
Biathlon	3	5	3	**11**
Nordic combined	3	0	0	**3**
Ski jumping	2	2	1	**5**
Freestyle skiing	2	0	0	**2**
Speed skating	1	2	1	**4**
Alpine skiing	0	1	1	**2**
Total	18	12	11	41

Medals by gender
Gender	1st place, gold medalist(s)	2nd place, silver medalist(s)	3rd place, bronze medalist(s)	Total
Male	14	5	8	**27**
Female	4	6	3	**13**
Mixed	0	1	0	**1**
Total	18	12	11	41

Multiple medalists
**Name**	**Sport**	1st place, gold medalist(s)	2nd place, silver medalist(s)	3rd place, bronze medalist(s)	Total
Johannes Høsflot Klæbo	Cross-country skiing	6	0	0	6
Sturla Holm Lægreid	Biathlon	0	3	2	5
Jens Lurås Oftebro	Nordic combined	3	0	0	3
Anna Odine Strøm	Ski jumping	2	1	0	3
Einar Hedegart	Cross-country skiing	2	0	1	3
Maren Kirkeeide	Biathlon	1	1	1	3
Martin Løwstrøm Nyenget	Cross-country skiing	1	1	1	3
Heidi Weng	Cross-country skiing	1	1	1	3
Ragne Wiklund	Speed skating	0	2	1	3
Johan-Olav Botn	Biathlon	1	1	0	2
Emil Iversen	Cross-country skiing	1	0	1	2
Eirin Maria Kvandal	Ski jumping	0	2	0	2
Vetle Sjåstad Christiansen	Biathlon	0	2	0	2
Kristoffer Eriksen Sundal	Ski jumping	0	1	1	2

== Alpine skiing ==
Norway qualified one female and one male alpine skier through the basic quota.

Men

Athlete	Event	Run 1		Run 2		Total	
Athlete	Event	Time	Rank	Time	Rank	Time	Rank
Timon Haugan	Giant slalom	1:16.49	14	1:10.81	8	2:27.30	11
Timon Haugan	Slalom	57.10	4	57.93	16	1:55.03	4
Henrik Kristoffersen	Giant slalom	1:15.85	6	1:11.19	14	2:27.04	7
Henrik Kristoffersen	Slalom	57.73	6	57.01	3	1:54.74	3rd place, bronze medalist(s)
Atle Lie McGrath	Giant slalom	1:15.93	8	1:10.89	9	2:26.82	5
Atle Lie McGrath	Slalom	56.14	1	DNF			
Fredrik Møller	Super-G	—N/a				1:26.12	8
Adrian Smiseth Sejersted	Downhill	—N/a				DNF	
Adrian Smiseth Sejersted	Super-G	—N/a				1:26.51	12
Simen Sellæg	Super-G	—N/a				1:28.63	27
Eirik Hystad Solberg	Giant slalom	DNF					
Eirik Hystad Solberg	Slalom	58.71	14	57.03	4	1:55.74	7
Adrian Smiseth Sejersted; Atle Lie McGrath	Team combined	1:53.69	16	52.23	7	2:45.92	12
Simen Sellæg; Timon Haugan	Team combined	1:54.72	19	52.18	6	2:46.90	17

Women

Athlete	Event	Run 1		Run 2		Total	
Athlete	Event	Time	Rank	Time	Rank	Time	Rank
Mina Fürst Holtmann	Giant slalom	1:04.28	9	1:09.96	8	2:14.24	6
Mina Fürst Holtmann	Slalom	49.46	19	52.73	13	1:42.19	17
Kajsa Vickhoff Lie	Downhill	—N/a				1:37.08	7
Kajsa Vickhoff Lie	Giant slalom	1:04.65	18	DNF			
Kajsa Vickhoff Lie	Super-G	—N/a				1:24.17	5
Thea Louise Stjernesund	Giant slalom	1:03.97	4	1:10.15	11	2:14.12	2nd place, silver medalist(s)
Thea Louise Stjernesund	Slalom	DNF					
Madeleine Sylvester-Davik	Giant slalom	1:05.49	26	1:10.43	18	2:15.92	25
Bianca Bakke Westhoff	Slalom	49.99	29	52.78	15	1:42.77	21
Kajsa Vickhoff Lie; Bianca Bakke Westhoff	Team combined	1:37.36	7	45.62	16	2:22.98	11

== Biathlon ==
Norway qualified five female and six male biathletes through the 2024–25 Biathlon World Cup score.

Men

Athlete	Event	Time	Misses	Rank
Johan-Olav Botn	Individual	51:31.5	0 (0+0+0+0)	1st place, gold medalist(s)
Johan-Olav Botn	Pursuit	32:46.9	3 (0+2+1+0)	10
Johan-Olav Botn	Sprint	23:51.3	1 (1+0)	8
Johan-Olav Botn	Mass start	41:24.5	5 (1+2+0+2)	8
Johannes Dale-Skjevdal	Individual	54:32.2	4 (2+0+0+2)	10
Johannes Dale-Skjevdal	Pursuit	32:18.5	3 (1+0+1+1)	6
Johannes Dale-Skjevdal	Sprint	23:36.1	2 (0+2)	6
Johannes Dale-Skjevdal	Mass start	39:17.1	0 (0+0+0+0)	1st place, gold medalist(s)
Sturla Holm Lægreid	Individual	52:19.8	1 (0+0+1+0)	3rd place, bronze medalist(s)
Sturla Holm Lægreid	Pursuit	31:32.5	2 (1+0+1+0)	2nd place, silver medalist(s)
Sturla Holm Lægreid	Sprint	23:09.0	0 (0+0)	3rd place, bronze medalist(s)
Sturla Holm Lægreid	Mass start	39:27.6	1 (0+0+1+0)	2nd place, silver medalist(s)
Martin Uldal	Individual	54:48.0	3 (1+0+1+1)	13
Vetle Sjåstad Christiansen	Pursuit	31:56.7	3 (1+0+1+1)	5
Vetle Sjåstad Christiansen	Sprint	23:06.8	0 (0+0)	2nd place, silver medalist(s)
Vetle Sjåstad Christiansen	Mass start	41:05.2	3 (0+0+2+1)	5
Isak Frey				
Martin Uldal; Johan-Olav Botn; Sturla Holm Lægreid; Vetle Sjåstad Christiansen	Team relay	1:20:05.0	6 (0+6)	2nd place, silver medalist(s)

Women

Athlete	Event	Time	Misses	Rank
Juni Arnekleiv				
Marthe Kråkstad Johansen	Individual	43:52.8	1 (0+0+0+1)	16
Marthe Kråkstad Johansen	Pursuit	33:26.6	3 (1+0+1+1)	33
Marthe Kråkstad Johansen	Sprint	22:35.3	2 (0+2)	33
Marthe Kråkstad Johansen	Mass start	38:23.5	1 (0+0+0+1)	13
Karoline Offigstad Knotten	Individual	44:34.1	2 (0+1+0+1)	25
Karoline Offigstad Knotten	Pursuit	32:16.2	2 (0+1+0+1)	15
Karoline Offigstad Knotten	Sprint	22:00.0	0 (0+0)	14
Karoline Offigstad Knotten	Mass start	38:01.9	2 (1+0+1+0)	8
Maren Kirkeeide	Individual	30:40.6	3 (0+1+0+2)	15
Maren Kirkeeide	Pursuit	32:16.2	2 (0+1+0+1)	2nd place, silver medalist(s)
Maren Kirkeeide	Sprint	20:40.8	0 (0+0)	1st place, gold medalist(s)
Maren Kirkeeide	Mass start	38:23.4	4 (1+1+0+2)	12
Ingrid Landmark Tandrevold	Individual	48:16.5	6 (1+4+1+1)	72
Ingrid Landmark Tandrevold	Pursuit	34:34.9	9 (3+0+3+3)	46
Ingrid Landmark Tandrevold	Sprint	21:52.6	2 (0+2)	10
Marthe Kråkstad Johansen; Juni Arnekleiv; Karoline Offigstad Knotten; Maren Kirkeeide	Team relay	1:11:30.3	7 (0+7)	3rd place, bronze medalist(s)

Mixed

Athlete	Event	Time	Misses	Rank
Martin Uldal; Vetle Sjåstad Christiansen; Karoline Offigstad Knotten; Maren Kirkeeide	Relay	1:05:52.7	2+6	4

== Cross-country skiing ==
Norway qualified one female and one male cross-country skier through the basic quota. Following the completion of the 2024–25 FIS Cross-Country World Cup, Norway qualified a further seven female and six male athletes.

Distance
Men

Athlete	Event	Classical		Freestyle		Final		
Athlete	Event	Time	Rank	Time	Rank	Time	Deficit	Rank
Harald Østberg Amundsen	10 km freestyle	—N/a		21:00.2	4	—N/a		
Harald Østberg Amundsen	20 km skiathlon	23:24.3	4	22:51.6	14	46:41.4	+30.4	6
Harald Østberg Amundsen	50 km classical	—N/a				DNF		
Einar Hedegart	10 km freestyle	—N/a		20:50.2	3rd place, bronze medalist(s)	—N/a		
Emil Iversen	50 km classical	—N/a				2:07:15.5	+30.7	3rd place, bronze medalist(s)
Johannes Høsflot Klæbo	10 km freestyle	—N/a		20:36.2	1st place, gold medalist(s)	—N/a		
Johannes Høsflot Klæbo	20 km skiathlon	23:22.6	2	22:22.5	2	46:11.0	—	1st place, gold medalist(s)
Johannes Høsflot Klæbo	50 km classical	—N/a				2:06:44.8	—	1st place, gold medalist(s)
Martin Løwstrøm Nyenget	10 km freestyle	—N/a		21:03.5	5	—N/a		
Martin Løwstrøm Nyenget	20 km skiathlon	23:22.1	1	22:22.8	3	46:13.1	+2.1	3rd place, bronze medalist(s)
Martin Løwstrøm Nyenget	50 km classical	—N/a				2:06:53.7	+8.9	2nd place, silver medalist(s)
Mattis Stenshagen	20 km skiathlon	23:23.8	3	24:11.3	37	48:03.7	+1:52.7	21
Emil Iversen; Martin Løwstrøm Nyenget; Einar Hedegart; Johannes Høsflot Klæbo	4 × 7.5 kilometre relay	—N/a				1:04:24.5	—	1st place, gold medalist(s)

Women

Athlete	Event	Classical		Freestyle		Final		
Athlete	Event	Time	Rank	Time	Rank	Time	Deficit	Rank
Kristin Austgulen Fosnæs	10 km Freestyle	—N/a		24:11.0	9	—N/a		
Kristin Austgulen Fosnæs	20 km Skiathlon	28:04.9	7	27:48.9	16	56:25.6	+2:40.4	10
Kristin Austgulen Fosnæs	50 km Classical	—N/a				2:23:12.1	+6:43.9	4
Karoline Simpson-Larsen	10 km Freestyle	—N/a		23:57.2	6	—N/a		
Karoline Simpson-Larsen	20 km Skiathlon	28:49.0	13	27:35.5	10	56:57.8	+3:12.6	13
Karoline Simpson-Larsen	50 km Classical	—N/a				2:29:30.3	+13:02.1	14
Astrid Øyre Slind	10 km Freestyle	—N/a		23:42.2	4	—N/a		
Astrid Øyre Slind	20 km Skiathlon	27:25.0	2	27:44.2	13	55:41.3	+1:56.1	6
Astrid Øyre Slind	50 km Classical	—N/a				DNF		
Heidi Weng	10 km Freestyle	—N/a		23:46.1	5	—N/a		
Heidi Weng	20 km Skiathlon	28:03.6	5	26:34.8	2	55:11.9	+1:26.7	3rd place, bronze medalist(s)
Heidi Weng	50 km Classical	—N/a				2:18:43.5	+2:15.3	2nd place, silver medalist(s)
Kristin Austgulen Fosnæs; Astrid Øyre Slind; Karoline Simpson-Larsen; Heidi Weng	4 × 7.5 kilometre relay	—N/a				1:15:44.8	—	1st place, gold medalist(s)

Sprint

Men

Athlete	Event	Qualification		Quarterfinal		Semifinal		Final	
Athlete	Event	Time	Rank	Time	Rank	Time	Rank	Time	Rank
Johannes Høsflot Klæbo	Men's sprint	3:07.37	1 Q	3:30.66	1 Q	3:39.73	1 Q	3:39.74	1st place, gold medalist(s)
Oskar Opstad Vike	Men's sprint	3:17.41	20 Q	3:31.96	1 Q	3:41.00	2 Q	3:46.55	3rd place, bronze medalist(s)
Harald Østberg Amundsen	Men's sprint	3:14.12	5 Q	3:32.50	3	Did not advance			
Erik Valnes	Men's sprint	3:17.44	21 Q	3:30.85	2 Q	3:41.48	4 q	4:14.58	6
Einar Hedegart; Johannes Høsflot Klæbo	Team sprint	5:48.39	2 Q	—N/a				18:28.98	1st place, gold medalist(s)

Women

Athlete	Event	Qualification		Quarterfinal		Semifinal		Final	
Athlete	Event	Time	Rank	Time	Rank	Time	Rank	Time	Rank
Ingrid Bergene Aabrekk	Individual sprint	3:46.94	22 Q	4:00.47	5	Did not advance			
Julie Bjervig Drivenes	Individual sprint	3:45.25	14 Q	3:55.88	3 q	4:13.16	1 Q	4:11.74	4
Milla Grosberghaugen Andreassen	Individual sprint	3:44.18	12 Q	3:57.92	2 Q	4:19.06	5	Did not advance	
Kristine Stavås Skistad	Individual sprint	3:45.48	16 Q	3:56.05	2 Q	4:10.75	3 q	4:32.47	5
Astrid Øyre Slind; Julie Bjervig Drivenes	Team sprint	6:47.89	5 Q	—N/a				20:36.00	4

== Curling ==
Summary

Team	Event	Group stage										Semifinal	Final / BM	
Team	Event	Opposition Score	Opposition Score	Opposition Score	Opposition Score	Opposition Score	Opposition Score	Opposition Score	Opposition Score	Opposition Score	Rank	Opposition Score	Opposition Score	Rank
Magnus Ramsfjell; Martin Sesaker; Bendik Ramsfjell; Gaute Nepstad; Wilhelm Næss	Men's tournament	GER; L 4–5	CHN; W 8–6	CZE; W 7–4	ITA; W 10–7	USA; L 8–10	GBR; W 7–6	SWE; L 4–7	SUI; L 4–10	CAN; W 8–6	3 Q	CAN; L 4–5	SUI; L 1–9	4
Kristin Skaslien; Magnus Nedregotten	Mixed doubles tournament	GBR; L 6–8	USA; L 6–8	CAN; L 3–6	SWE; W 9–0	EST; W 6–5	ITA; L 5–6	CZE; L 3–6	SUI; W 6–3	KOR; W 8–5	6	Did not advance		

=== Men's tournament ===
Norway qualified a men's team by finishing in the top seven based on the combined points at the 2024 and 2025 World Championships. Team Magnus Ramsfjell qualified as Norwegian representatives by qualifying the country for the Games.

Final Round Robin Standings
Team	Skip	Pld	W	L	W–L	PF	PA	EW	EL	BE	SE	S%	DSC	Qualification
Switzerland	Yannick Schwaller	9	9	0	–	75	40	42	30	3	8	88.7%	9.506	Playoffs
Canada	Brad Jacobs	9	7	2	–	63	45	40	28	8	13	86.5%	28.844	Playoffs
Norway	Magnus Ramsfjell	9	5	4	1–0	60	61	37	38	6	7	80.8%	26.938	Playoffs
Great Britain	Bruce Mouat	9	5	4	0–1	63	48	39	33	2	10	86.4%	16.613	Playoffs
United States	Daniel Casper	9	4	5	1–1	52	65	34	37	5	3	81.7%	17.663	
Italy	Joël Retornaz	9	4	5	1–1	58	67	33	39	6	7	83.0%	17.869	
Germany	Marc Muskatewitz	9	4	5	1–1	51	57	36	37	8	7	84.4%	24.850	
Czech Republic	Lukáš Klíma	9	3	6	–	54	63	35	41	3	5	79.8%	29.013	
Sweden	Niklas Edin	9	2	7	1–0	44	63	31	39	6	3	82.5%	26.000	
China	Xu Xiaoming	9	2	7	0–1	52	63	35	40	3	5	81.4%	34.875	

Source: Official website

Round robin
Norway had a bye in draws 1, 5 and 9.

Draw 2
Thursday, 12 February, 14:05

Sheet A	1	2	3	4	5	6	7	8	9	10	Final
Norway (Ramsfjell)	0	1	0	0	1	0	0	1	0	1	4
Germany (Muskatewitz) 🔨	0	0	3	0	0	1	0	0	1	0	5

Draw 3
Friday, 13 February, 9:05

Sheet C	1	2	3	4	5	6	7	8	9	10	11	Final
China (Xu)	0	2	0	1	0	1	0	1	0	1	0	6
Norway (Ramsfjell) 🔨	0	0	2	0	2	0	1	0	1	0	2	8

Draw 4
Friday, 13 February, 19:05

Sheet B	1	2	3	4	5	6	7	8	9	10	Final
Czech Republic (Klíma) 🔨	0	0	1	0	1	0	1	0	1	X	4
Norway (Ramsfjell)	1	0	0	2	0	2	0	2	0	X	7

Draw 6
Sunday, 15 February, 9:05

Sheet D	1	2	3	4	5	6	7	8	9	10	Final
Norway (Ramsfjell) 🔨	0	1	0	3	0	1	1	0	0	4	10
Italy (Retornaz)	0	0	1	0	4	0	0	1	1	0	7

Draw 7
Sunday, 15 February, 19:05

Sheet B	1	2	3	4	5	6	7	8	9	10	Final
Norway (Ramsfjell)	0	0	0	1	2	0	2	0	3	0	8
United States (Casper) 🔨	1	2	2	0	0	2	0	1	0	2	10

Draw 8
Monday, 16 February, 14:05

Sheet A	1	2	3	4	5	6	7	8	9	10	Final
Great Britain (Mouat) 🔨	0	0	0	2	0	2	0	0	2	0	6
Norway (Ramsfjell)	0	0	1	0	1	0	2	2	0	1	7

Draw 10
Tuesday, 17 February, 19:05

Sheet D	1	2	3	4	5	6	7	8	9	10	Final
Sweden (Edin) 🔨	0	2	0	2	0	1	0	2	0	X	7
Norway (Ramsfjell)	1	0	0	0	0	0	2	0	1	X	4

Draw 11
Wednesday, 18 February, 14:05

Sheet C	1	2	3	4	5	6	7	8	9	10	Final
Norway (Ramsfjell)	0	1	0	2	0	0	1	0	X	X	4
Switzerland (Schwaller) 🔨	2	0	1	0	2	1	0	4	X	X	10

Draw 12
Thursday, 19 February, 9:05

Sheet D	1	2	3	4	5	6	7	8	9	10	Final
Norway (Ramsfjell) 🔨	3	0	2	0	2	0	0	1	0	X	8
Canada (Jacobs)	0	1	0	1	0	3	1	0	0	X	6

Semifinal

Thursday, 19 February, 19:35

Sheet D	1	2	3	4	5	6	7	8	9	10	11	Final
Canada (Jacobs) 🔨	0	1	1	0	0	1	0	0	1	0	1	5
Norway (Ramsfjell)	0	0	0	1	0	0	0	1	0	2	0	4

Bronze medal game

Friday, 20 February, 19:05

Sheet C	1	2	3	4	5	6	7	8	9	10	Final
Switzerland (Schwaller) 🔨	0	3	1	0	0	0	0	2	3	X	9
Norway (Ramsfjell)	0	0	0	0	1	0	0	0	0	X	1

=== Mixed doubles tournament ===
Norway qualified a mixed doubles team by earning enough points in the last two World Curling Championships. Kristin Skaslien and Magnus Nedregotten qualified as Norwegian representatives by representing the country at both the 2024 and 2025 World Championships.

Final Round Robin Standings
Team	Athletes	Pld	W	L	W–L	PF	PA	EW	EL	BE	SE	S%	DSC	Qualification
Great Britain	Jennifer Dodds / Bruce Mouat	9	8	1	–	69	46	37	30	0	11	79.6%	20.931	Playoffs
Italy	Stefania Constantini / Amos Mosaner	9	6	3	1–0	60	50	32	31	1	11	78.3%	27.931	Playoffs
United States	Cory Thiesse / Korey Dropkin	9	6	3	0–1	58	45	36	33	0	12	83.1%	25.900	Playoffs
Sweden	Isabella Wranå / Rasmus Wranå	9	5	4	–	62	55	31	34	0	9	80.1%	19.413	Playoffs
Canada	Jocelyn Peterman / Brett Gallant	9	4	5	2–0	58	52	35	31	0	10	78.5%	36.050	
Norway	Kristin Skaslien / Magnus Nedregotten	9	4	5	1–1	52	47	37	33	0	12	77.1%	24.444	
Switzerland	Briar Schwaller-Hürlimann / Yannick Schwaller	9	4	5	0–2	56	67	32	35	0	6	74.5%	24.000	
Czech Republic	Julie Zelingrová / Vít Chabičovský	9	3	6	1–0	45	62	30	34	0	6	69.1%	16.019	
South Korea	Kim Seon-yeong / Jeong Yeong-seok	9	3	6	0–1	47	64	32	34	0	9	75.1%	42.425	
Estonia	Marie Kaldvee / Harri Lill	9	2	7	–	46	65	32	39	0	7	71.6%	19.300	

Source: Official website

Round robin
Norway had a bye in draws 4, 5, 7, and 11.

Draw 1
Wednesday, 4 February, 19:05

Sheet B	1	2	3	4	5	6	7	8	Final
Great Britain (Dodds / Mouat) 🔨	0	3	0	1	0	3	0	1	8
Norway (Skaslien / Nedregotten)	1	0	2	0	1	0	2	0	6

Draw 2
Thursday, 5 February, 10:05

Sheet C	1	2	3	4	5	6	7	8	Final
Norway (Skaslien / Nedregotten)	0	3	0	2	0	1	0	0	6
United States (Thiesse / Dropkin) 🔨	1	0	2	0	1	0	2	2	8

Draw 3
Thursday, 5 February, 14:35

Sheet B	1	2	3	4	5	6	7	8	Final
Norway (Skaslien / Nedregotten) 🔨	0	1	0	0	1	0	1	0	3
Canada (Peterman / Gallant)	1	0	2	1	0	1	0	1	6

Draw 6
Friday, 6 February, 14:35

Sheet D	1	2	3	4	5	6	7	8	Final
Sweden (Wranå / Wranå) 🔨	0	0	0	0	0	0	X	X	0
Norway (Skaslien / Nedregotten)	1	1	3	1	2	1	X	X	9

Draw 8
Saturday, 7 February, 14:35

Sheet A	1	2	3	4	5	6	7	8	Final
Estonia (Kaldvee / Lill)	0	0	1	0	2	0	2	0	5
Norway (Skaslien / Nedregotten) 🔨	1	1	0	1	0	2	0	1	6

Draw 9
Saturday, 7 February, 19:05

Sheet D	1	2	3	4	5	6	7	8	Final
Norway (Skaslien / Nedregotten) 🔨	2	0	1	0	1	1	0	0	5
Italy (Constantini / Mosaner)	0	1	0	2	0	0	2	1	6

Draw 10
Sunday, 8 February, 10:05

Sheet A	1	2	3	4	5	6	7	8	Final
Norway (Skaslien / Nedregotten)	0	1	0	0	1	0	1	0	3
Czech Republic (Zelingrová / Chabičovský) 🔨	1	0	2	1	0	1	0	1	6

Draw 12
Sunday, 8 February, 19:05

Sheet C	1	2	3	4	5	6	7	8	Final
Switzerland (Schwaller-Hürlimann / Schwaller)	0	1	0	1	0	1	0	0	3
Norway (Skaslien / Nedregotten) 🔨	1	0	1	0	1	0	2	1	6

Draw 13
Monday, 9 February, 10:05

Sheet C	1	2	3	4	5	6	7	8	Final
Norway (Skaslien / Nedregotten) 🔨	0	0	2	0	0	3	2	1	8
South Korea (Kim / Jeong)	1	2	0	1	1	0	0	0	5

== Freestyle skiing ==
Park & Pipe

Athlete	Event	Qualification					Final				
Athlete	Event	Run 1	Run 2	Run 3	Best	Rank	Run 1	Run 2	Run 3	Best	Rank
Tormod Frostad	Men's big air	22.50	96.25	84.00	180.25	4 Q	95.25	97.00	98.50	195.50	1st place, gold medalist(s)
Tormod Frostad	Men's slopestyle	79.96	72.80	—N/a	79.96	2 Q	33.38	42.51	29.10	42.51	12
Birk Ruud	Men's big air	90.75	90.25	DNS	181.00	3 Q	95.00	23.25	DNI	118.25	8
Birk Ruud	Men's slopestyle	81.75	37.05	—N/a	81.75	1 Q	86.28	45.08	8.16	86.28	1st place, gold medalist(s)
Ulrik Samnøy	Men's big air	87.00	89.00	DNS	176.00	8 Q	21.75	84.25	26.50	110.75	9
Ulrik Samnøy	Men's slopestyle	36.05	21.78	—N/a	36.05	24	Did not advance				
Sebastian Schjerve	Men's big air	32.75	49.75	81.75	131.50	21	Did not advance				
Sebastian Schjerve	Men's slopestyle	22.88	67.63	—N/a	67.63	11 Q	28.50	1.38	76.20	76.20	6
Sandra Eie	Women's big air	19.00	DNI	36.00	36.00	26	Did not advance				

== Nordic combined ==
Athlete	Event	Ski jumping			Cross-country		Total	
Athlete	Event	Distance	Points	Rank	Time	Rank	Time	Rank
Einar Lurås Oftebro	Individual normal hill/10 km	99.0	127.5	4	31:56.0	15	32:16.0	12
Einar Lurås Oftebro	Individual large hill/10 km	130.0	138.9	9	24:50.3	7	25:34.3	6
Jens Lurås Oftebro	Individual normal hill/10 km	104.0	125.6	7	29:31.4	2	29:59.4	1st place, gold medalist(s)
Jens Lurås Oftebro	Individual large hill/10 km	132.5	144.6	5	24:23.0	1	24:45.0	1st place, gold medalist(s)
Andreas Skoglund	Individual normal hill/10 km	96.5	120.6	14	30:17.3	6	31:05.3	7
Andreas Skoglund	Individual large hill/10 km	132.0	146.1	3	25:10.9	9	25:26.9	4
Jens Lurås Oftebro; Andreas Skoglund	Team large hill/7.5 km	247.0	237.0	2	41:05.0	3	41:18.0	1st place, gold medalist(s)

== Ski jumping ==
Men
Individual

Athlete	Event	First round			Final round			Total	
Athlete	Event	Distance	Points	Rank	Distance	Points	Rank	Points	Rank
Johann André Forfang	Normal hill	103.5	129.5	12 Q	103.0	130.3	9	259.8	9
Johann André Forfang	Large hill	128.5	60.9	13 Q	132.5	68.1	11	271.1	12
Marius Lindvik	Normal hill	103.5	130.4	9 Q	104.5	127.9	17	258.3	12
Marius Lindvik	Large hill	123.0	119.3	32	Did not advance				
Kristoffer Eriksen Sundal	Normal hill	103.5	132.9	3 Q	105.0	126.7	19	259.6	10
Kristoffer Eriksen Sundal	Large hill	136.0	74.4	3 Q	135.5	73.5	7	288.0	4

Team

Athlete	Event	First round			Second round			Final round			Total	
Athlete	Event	Distance	Points	Rank	Distance	Points	Rank	Distance	Points	Rank	Points	Rank
Johann André Forfang; Kristoffer Eriksen Sundal	Super team large hill	264.0	267.9	6	266.5	270.1	3	Cancelled			538.0	3rd place, bronze medalist(s)

Women

Athlete	Event	First round			Final round			Total	
Athlete	Event	Distance	Points	Rank	Distance	Points	Rank	Points	Rank
Eirin Maria Kvandal	Normal hill	99.5	131.9	4	98.0	123.0	5	254.9	5
Eirin Maria Kvandal	Large hill	129.0	140.6	1	133.5	142.1	3	282.7	2nd place, silver medalist(s)
Silje Opseth	Normal hill	101.0	120.0	15	98.5	119.3	8	239.3	12
Silje Opseth	Large hill	126.5	131.8	3	125.5	130.8	9	262.6	5
Anna Odine Strøm	Normal hill	100.0	136.9	1	101.0	130.4	1	267.3	1st place, gold medalist(s)
Anna Odine Strøm	Large hill	130.5	136.7	2	132.0	148.1	1	284.8	1st place, gold medalist(s)
Heidi Dyhre Tråserud	Normal hill	96.0	128.2	6	99.0	120.4	7	248.6	6
Heidi Dyhre Tråserud	Large hill	124.5	129.6	4	119.5	129.5	10	259.1	6

Mixed

Athlete	Event	First round			Final			Total	
Athlete	Event	Distance	Points	Rank	Distance	Points	Rank	Points	Rank
Anna Odine Strøm; Kristoffer Eriksen Sundal; Eirin Maria Kvandal; Marius Lindvik	Mixed team	401.5	510.8	3	398.0	527.5	4	1038.3	2nd place, silver medalist(s)

== Ski mountaineering ==
Norway qualified one female and two male ski mountaineer through the Olympic ranking lists.

Athlete	Event	Heat		Semifinal		Final	
Athlete	Event	Time	Rank	Time	Rank	Time	Rank
Hans-Inge Klette	Men's sprint	2:48.19	3 Q	2:51.30	5	Did not advance	
Trym Dalset Lødøen	Men's sprint	2:55.87	6	Did not advance			
Ida Waldal	Women's sprint	3:15.36	4LL	3:15.28	4	Did not advance	
Hans-Inge Klette; Ida Waldal	Mixed relay	—N/a				30:11.33	10

== Snowboarding ==
Park & Pipe

Athlete	Event	Qualification					Final				
Athlete	Event	Run 1	Run 2	Run 3	Best	Rank	Run 1	Run 2	Run 3	Best	Rank
Øyvind Kirkhus	Men's big air	15.00	84.25	57.75	142.00	23	Did not advance				
Øyvind Kirkhus	Men's slopestyle	46.83	61.83	—N/a	61.83	16	Did not advance				
Marcus Kleveland	Men's big air	81.75	80.25	79.75	162.00	13	Did not advance				
Marcus Kleveland	Men's slopestyle	76.96	81.86	—N/a	81.86	2 Q	23.70	42.63	78.96	78.96	4
Mons Røisland	Men's big air	86.75	18.00	71.25	158.00	16	Did not advance				
Mons Røisland	Men's slopestyle	15.56	69.63	—N/a	69.63	12 Q	26.10	46.50	45.40	46.50	12

== Speed skating ==
Norway qualified ten speed skaters (five men and five women) through performances at the 2025-26 ISU Speed Skating World Cup.

Men

Athlete	Event	Race	
Athlete	Event	Time	Rank
Bjørn Magnussen	500 m	34.72	13
Henrik Fagerli Rukke	500 m	35.36	26
Bjørn Magnussen	1000 m	1:09.384	21
Sander Eitrem	1500 m	1:45.36	9
Peder Kongshaug	1500 m	1:43.93	5
Didrik Strand	1500 m	1:46.76	21
Sander Eitrem	5000 m	6:03.95	1st place, gold medalist(s)
Sigurd Henriksen	5000 m	6:18.24	14
Peder Kongshaug	5000 m	6:11.31	6
Sander Eitrem	10,000 m	12:47.11	7
Sigurd Henriksen	10,000 m	13:27.29	11

Women

Athlete	Event	Race	
Athlete	Event	Time	Rank
Julie Nistad Samsonsen	500 m	38.37	20
Aurora Grinden Løvås	1500 m	1:58.77	25
Ragne Wiklund	1500 m	1:54.15	2nd place, silver medalist(s)
Ragne Wiklund	3000 m	3:56.54	2nd place, silver medalist(s)
Ragne Wiklund	5000 m	6:46.34	3rd place, bronze medalist(s)

Mass start

Athlete	Event	Semifinal			Final		
Athlete	Event	Points	Time	Rank	Points	Time	Rank
Sigurd Holbø Dyrset	Men's	0	7:44.18	12	Did not advance		
Didrik Strand	Men's	0	8:42.18	15	Did not advance		
Aurora Grinden Løvås	Women's	0	8:43.15	12	Did not advance		

Team pursuit

Athlete	Event	Quarterfinal		Semifinal		Final	
Athlete	Event	Opposition Time	Rank	Opposition Time	Rank	Opposition Time	Rank
Sigurd Holbø Dyrset; Peder Kongshaug; Didrik Eng Strand	Men's	3:44.36	6 FC	Did not advance		Final C France; L 3:48.92	6

== See also ==
- Norway at the 2026 Winter Paralympics
