= Biathlon at the 2026 Winter Olympics – Men's individual =

Men's individual at the XXV Olympic Winter Games
- Biathlon
- Venue: Anterselva Biathlon Arena
- Date: 10 February 2026
- Competitors: 89 from 28 nations
- Winning time: 51:31.5

Medalists
1st place, gold medalist(s)		Johan-Olav Botn	Norway
2nd place, silver medalist(s)		Éric Perrot	France
3rd place, bronze medalist(s)		Sturla Holm Lægreid	Norway

The men's individual competition of the 2026 Winter Olympics was held on 10 February, at the Anterselva Biathlon Arena in Rasen-Antholz. Johan-Olav Botn of Norway won the event, Éric Perrot of France won the silver medal, and Sturla Holm Lægreid of Norway won bronze. For Botn, it was the first Olympic medal, and for Lægreid, the first individual Olympic medal.

== Background ==
The defending champion, Quentin Fillon Maillet, qualified for the Olympics. The silver medalist, Anton Smolski, was barred from participation as a consequence of the Russian invasion of Ukraine. The bronze medalist Johannes Thingnes Bø retired from competitions. Prior to the Olympics, Éric Perrot was leading the total as well as individual standings of the 2025–26 Biathlon World Cup. He was also the 2025 World champion.

== Results ==
The race was started at 13:30.

Rank	Bib	Name	Country	Time	Penalties (P+S+P+S)	Deficit
1st place, gold medalist(s)	58	Johan-Olav Botn	Norway	51:31.5	0 (0+0+0+0)	
2nd place, silver medalist(s)	38	Éric Perrot	France	51:46.3	1 (0+1+0+0)	+14.8
3rd place, bronze medalist(s)	62	Sturla Holm Lægreid	Norway	52:19.8	1 (0+0+1+0)	+48.3
4	27	Olli Hiidensalo	Finland	53:01.2	0 (0+0+0+0)	+1:29.7
5	40	Philipp Nawrath	Germany	53:03.0	1 (1+0+0+0)	+1:31.5
6	52	Tommaso Giacomel	Italy	53:59.0	3 (1+1+0+1)	+2:27.5
7	46	Sebastian Samuelsson	Sweden	54:00.8	2 (0+0+0+2)	+2:29.3
8	54	Quentin Fillon Maillet	France	54:20.9	4 (1+2+0+1)	+2:49.4
9	48	Martin Ponsiluoma	Sweden	54:26.2	3 (0+0+2+1)	+2:54.7
10	44	Johannes Dale-Skjevdal	Norway	54:32.2	4 (2+0+0+2)	+3:00.7
11	82	Otto Invenius	Finland	54:39.5	1 (1+0+0+0)	+3:08.0
12	22	Jesper Nelin	Sweden	54:45.3	2 (1+0+0+1)	+3:13.8
13	56	Martin Uldal	Norway	54:48.0	3 (1+0+1+1)	+3:16.5
14	15	Patrick Braunhofer	Italy	55:01.7	1 (0+0+1+0)	+3:30.2
15	68	Tuomas Harjula	Finland	55:15.0	1 (0+1+0+0)	+3:43.5
16	50	Lukas Hofer	Italy	55:32.5	3 (0+0+1+2)	+4:01.0
17	16	Fabien Claude	France	55:46.9	4 (2+1+0+1)	+4:15.4
18	6	Dmytro Pidruchnyi	Ukraine	56:10.4	3 (0+3+0+0)	+4:38.9
19	32	Vytautas Strolia	Lithuania	56:15.0	1 (0+0+0+1)	+4:43.5
20	83	Miha Dovžan	Slovenia	56:28.0	1 (0+0+0+1)	+4:56.5
21	24	David Zobel	Germany	56:31.8	2 (0+2+0+0)	+5:00.3
22	63	Blagoy Todev	Bulgaria	56:34.9	2 (1+0+0+1)	+5:03.4
23	17	Lucas Fratzscher	Germany	56:38.7	2 (0+0+1+1)	+5:07.2
24	69	Patrick Jakob	Austria	56:40.0	2 (1+0+1+0)	+5:08.5
25	31	Elia Zeni	Italy	56:46.5	3 (1+2+0+0)	+5:15.0
26	34	Vítězslav Hornig	Czech Republic	56:47.0	2 (1+0+1+0)	+5:15.5
27	42	Campbell Wright	United States	56:53.9	2 (1+1+0+0)	+5:22.4
28	26	Vitalii Mandzyn	Ukraine	56:55.0	4 (0+1+1+2)	+5:23.5
29	13	Jakov Fak	Slovenia	56:55.5	2 (1+0+1+0)	+5:24.0
30	55	Karol Dombrovski	Lithuania	57:00.0	1 (0+1+0+0)	+5:28.5
31	5	Renārs Birkentāls	Latvia	57:00.7	2 (1+1+0+0)	+5:29.2
32	11	Dominic Unterweger	Austria	57:08.5	2 (1+0+1+0)	+5:37.0
33	57	Grzegorz Galica	Poland	57:10.2	3 (1+0+2+0)	+5:38.7
34	36	Simon Eder	Austria	57:16.9	2 (0+0+1+1)	+5:45.4
35	77	Anton Dudchenko	Ukraine	57:21.7	1 (0+1+0+0)	+5:50.2
36	30	Joscha Burkhalter	Switzerland	57:22.0	3 (1+1+0+1)	+5:50.5
37	1	Viktor Brandt	Sweden	57:38.3	4 (1+0+0+3)	+6:06.8
38	18	Michal Krčmář	Czech Republic	57:45.4	4 (1+2+1+0)	+6:13.9
39	74	George Buta	Romania	57:46.8	1 (1+0+0+0)	+6:15.3
40	28	Philipp Horn	Germany	57:50.8	6 (2+1+1+2)	+6:19.3
41	35	Andrejs Rastorgujevs	Latvia	57:51.4	3 (1+0+1+1)	+6:19.9
42	78	Rene Zahkna	Estonia	57:55.5	2 (0+1+0+1)	+6:24.0
43	84	Marcin Zawół	Poland	57:58.9	3 (0+1+1+1)	+6:27.4
44	72	Paul Schommer	United States	58:00.4	1 (0+0+0+1)	+6:28.9
45	43	Pavel Magazeev	Moldova	58:02.3	3 (1+1+0+1)	+6:30.8
46	61	Florent Claude	Belgium	58:04.2	3 (1+2+0+0)	+6:32.7
47	39	Mark-Markos Kehva	Estonia	58:09.3	1 (0+0+0+1)	+6:37.8
48	65	Lovro Planko	Slovenia	58:16.9	4 (0+1+1+2)	+6:45.4
49	25	Konrad Badacz	Poland	58:19.7	4 (2+1+1+0)	+6:48.2
50	86	Nikita Čigak	Lithuania	58:22.4	1 (0+1+0+0)	+6:50.9
51	20	Tero Seppälä	Finland	58:22.5	6 (2+1+2+1)	+6:51.0
52	9	Thierry Langer	Belgium	58:35.8	3 (0+1+2+0)	+7:04.3
53	41	Vladislav Kireyev	Kazakhstan	58:49.4	3 (1+2+0+0)	+7:17.9
54	23	George Colțea	Romania	58:50.7	3 (1+1+0+1)	+7:19.2
55	60	Émilien Jacquelin	France	58:59.4	6 (2+1+0+3)	+7:27.9
56	4	Maksim Fomin	Lithuania	59:00.0	3 (0+1+1+1)	+7:28.5
57	2	Yan Xingyuan	China	59:01.5	3 (0+0+2+1)	+7:30.0
58	70	Kristo Siimer	Estonia	59:09.6	3 (1+1+1+0)	+7:38.1
59	8	Niklas Hartweg	Switzerland	59:11.5	6 (1+0+1+4)	+7:40.0
60	37	Sebastian Stalder	Switzerland	59:18.3	3 (0+0+1+2)	+7:46.8
61	59	Jan Guńka	Poland	59:25.2	4 (1+0+2+1)	+7:53.7
62	12	Sondre Slettemark	Denmark	59:44.5	3 (0+2+0+1)	+8:13.0
63	76	Jeremy Finello	Switzerland	59:44.9	7 (1+2+1+3)	+8:13.4
64	51	Adam Runnalls	Canada	1:00:04.5	5 (1+2+1+1)	+8:33.0
65	67	Taras Lesiuk	Ukraine	1:00:31.5	4 (1+2+0+1)	+9:00.0
66	73	Zachary Connelly	Canada	1:00:39.1	6 (1+3+1+1)	+9:07.6
67	49	Maxime Germain	United States	1:00:44.9	3 (0+2+0+1)	+9:13.4
68	66	Mikuláš Karlík	Czech Republic	1:00:48.6	5 (0+1+1+3)	+9:17.1
69	80	Anton Sinapov	Bulgaria	1:00:50.1	4 (1+1+0+2)	+9:18.6
70	64	Dmitrii Shamaev	Romania	1:00:59.2	2 (1+0+0+1)	+9:27.7
71	53	Anton Vidmar	Slovenia	1:01:06.9	7 (2+2+0+3)	+9:35.4
72	3	Matija Legović	Croatia	1:01:11.4	6 (1+1+1+3)	+9:39.9
73	75	Fabian Müllauer	Austria	1:01:17.4	7 (1+2+3+1)	+9:45.9
74	29	Asset Dyussenov	Kazakhstan	1:01:20.2	5 (2+2+1+0)	+9:48.7
75	33	Vladimir Iliev	Bulgaria	1:01:22.8	9 (3+2+3+1)	+9:51.3
76	47	Krešimir Crnković	Croatia	1:01:32.3	4 (0+1+1+2)	+10:00.8
77	88	Logan Pletz	Canada	1:01:42.9	5 (2+1+1+1)	+10:11.4
78	19	Konstantin Vasilev	Bulgaria	1:01:55.1	9 (3+2+3+1)	+10:23.6
79	21	Jacques Jefferies	Great Britain	1:02:11.0	4 (1+1+1+1)	+10:39.5
80	7	Sean Doherty	United States	1:02:16.8	6 (1+0+3+2)	+10:45.3
81	10	Petr Hák	Czech Republic	1:02:48.3	7 (2+2+1+2)	+11:16.8
82	45	Šimon Adamov	Slovakia	1:03:01.4	7 (0+4+1+2)	+11:29.9
83	79	Edgars Mise	Latvia	1:04:51.0	6 (1+1+1+3)	+13:19.5
84	81	Maksim Makarov	Moldova	1:04:54.4	5 (1+1+1+2)	+13:22.9
85	87	Choi Du-jin	South Korea	1:05:07.6	5 (2+1+2+0)	+13:36.1
86	85	Jasper Fleming	Canada	1:05:15.5	8 (1+3+2+2)	+13:44.0
87	14	Jakob Kulbin	Estonia	1:05:17.3	7 (2+2+3+0)	+13:45.8
88	71	Rihards Lozbers	Latvia	1:05:25.7	8 (3+4+1+0)	+13:54.2
89	89	Raul Flore	Romania	1:06:25.1	4 (1+1+0+2)	+14:53.6
