= Chingiz Rakparov =

Kazakhstani Nordic combined skier

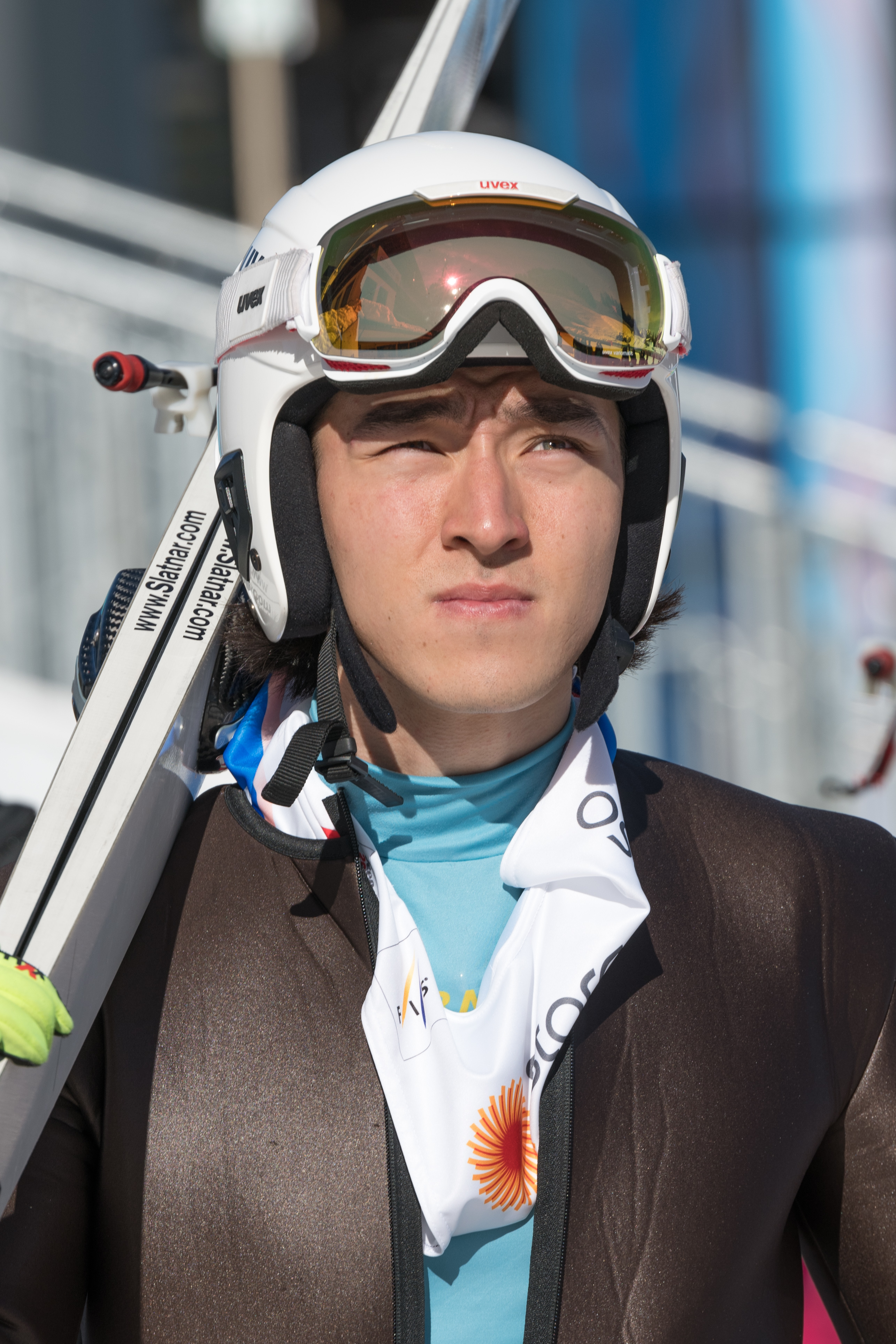
- Rakparov in 2019

Personal information
- Nationality: Kazakhstan
- Born: 5 July 1995 (age 31) Almaty, Kazakhstan

Sport
- Sport: Skiing

Şyñğys Ruslanūly Raqparov (Kazakh: Шыңғыс Русланұлы Рақпаров; also Chingiz Ruslanovich Rakparov from Russian: Чингиз Русланович Ракпаров; born 5 July 1995) is a Kazakh Nordic combined skier who represented Kazakhstan at the 2022 Winter Olympics.
