= Thomas Rettenegger =

Austrian Nordic combined skier (born 2000)

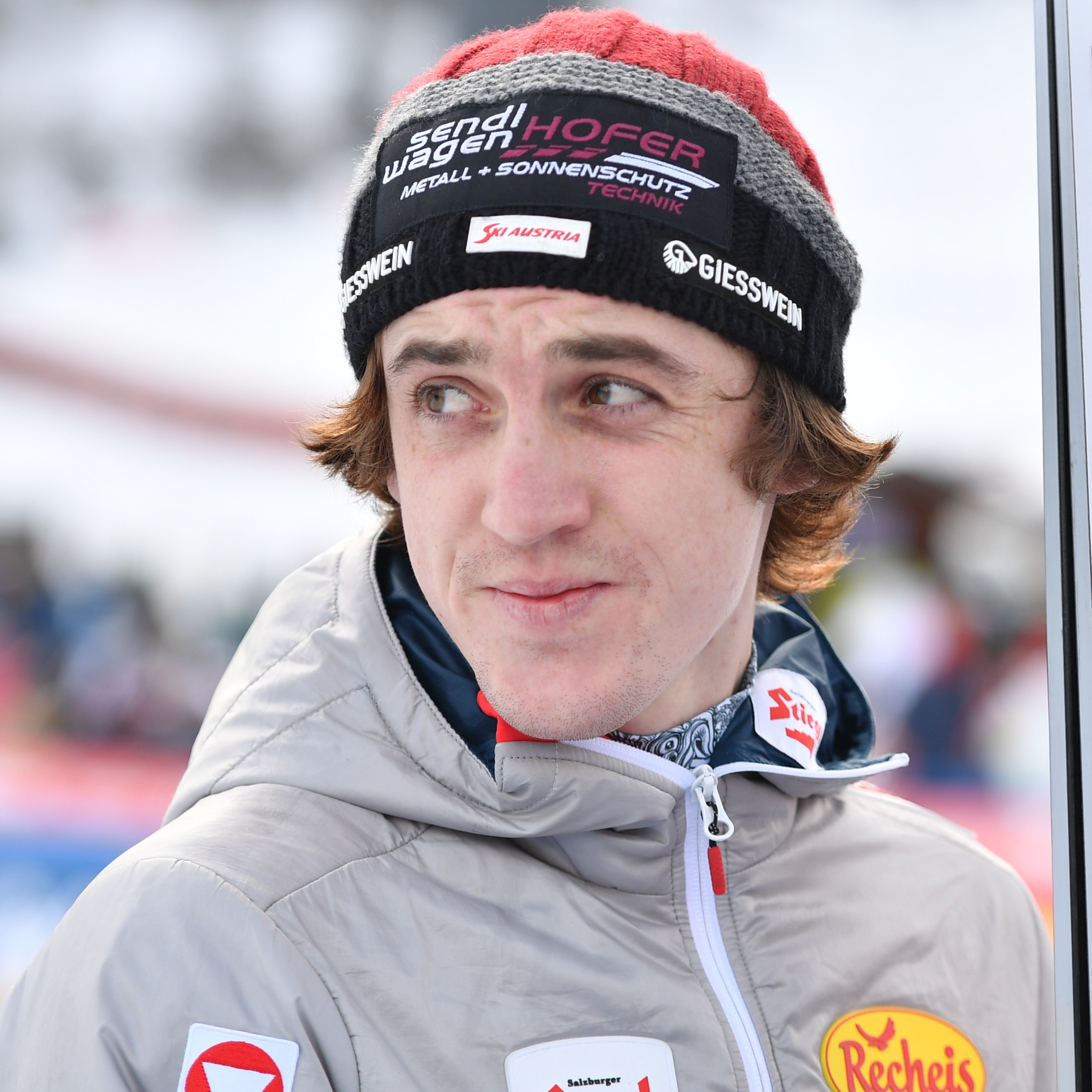
- Rettenegger in 2023

Personal information
- Nationality: Austria
- Born: 5 February 2000 (age 26) Schwarzach im Pongau, Austria

Sport
- Sport: Skiing
- Club: TSU St. Veit

World Cup career
- Seasons: 5 – (2022–present)
- Indiv. starts: 76
- Indiv. podiums: 4
- Indiv. wins: 2
- Team podiums: 0
Medal record
Men's Nordic combined
Representing Austria
World Junior Championships
Gold medal – first place	2020 Oberwiesenthal	Team NH
- Updated on 11 February 2026

Thomas Rettenegger (born 5 February 2000) is an Austrian Nordic combined skier. He represented Austria at the 2026 Winter Olympics.

== Career ==
During the 2022–23 FIS Nordic Combined World Cup, Rettenegger earned his first career World Cup podium on 7 January 2023, finishing in third place. Two weeks later he earned his second career world cup victory on 19 December 2025.

During the 2025–26 FIS Nordic Combined World Cup, Rettenegger earned his first career World Cup victory on 6 December 2025 in the mass start event. Two weeks later he earned his second career world cup victory on 19 December 2025.

Rettenegger was selected to represent Austria at the 2026 Winter Olympics in Nordic combined.

== Personal life ==
Rettenegger's younger brother, Stefan is also a Nordic combined skier.
