= Nordic combined at the 2026 Winter Olympics =

Nordic combined at the XXV Olympic Winter Games
- Nordic combined pictogram
- Venue: Predazzo Ski Jumping Stadium; Cross country and biathlon center Fabio Canal
- Dates: 11–19 February 2026
- No. of events: 3

Nordic combined at the 2026 Winter Olympics was held at the Predazzo Ski Jumping Stadium (ski jumping) and Cross country and biathlon center Fabio Canal (cross-country skiing). The three events took place between 11 and 19 February 2026.

== Background ==
A historic discipline of the Winter Olympic program, Nordic combined at the Winter Olympics has been continuously included since the first edition in Chamonix-Mont-Blanc 1924. However, in 2026 it remains the last exclusively male discipline of the Winter Games, as the International Olympic Committee has once again refused to introduce women’s events, particularly due to the limited diversity of participating nations and the still relatively recent development of international women’s competitions.

The Olympic program includes three events: two individual competitions, held on the normal hill and the large hill respectively, and one team event. The total number of qualified athletes has been reduced from 55 to 36 competitors, a significant limitation compared to previous editions, while the maximum quota per National Olympic Committee has been reduced from five to three athletes. This comes amid ongoing debate within the IOC about maintaining Nordic combined in the Olympic program, also in light of the goal of achieving full gender equality in Olympic competitions. In June 2022, the IOC confirmed the inclusion of the event in the Milano Cortina 2026 Olympic Games: this decision was made in what the institution considered a unique context, particularly related to athletes' progress in training and the proximity of the Olympic Games. However, this inclusion has been accompanied by monitoring of the event for future editions.

Several factors explain the issues surrounding the Olympic future of Nordic combined. At the 2022 Winter Olympics, the discipline recorded one of the lowest television audience levels among Nordic sports. Moreover, top-level performances are regularly delivered by athletes from only four nations (Germany, Austria, Japan, and Norway), which have shared all the Olympic medals awarded since the Sochi 2014 Olympic Games, thus highlighting a limited geographical reach and qualifying it as an elite discipline. The absence of women’s events is also a central point of debate: although women's Nordic combined competitions have existed internationally since the 2020–2021 World Cup season, their development remains recent and involves a limited number of nations, resulting in a depth of field considered insufficient by Olympic authorities.

In this context, the 2026 Winter Olympics were seen as crucial for the future of Nordic combined in the Olympic program. The IOC has clearly indicated that the discipline’s continuation beyond 2026, particularly with a view to the French Alps 2030 Olympic Games, would depend on several developments, including the introduction of women’s events, increased viewership, and greater diversification of participating nations. Conversely, without sufficient progress in these areas, Nordic combined's place in the Olympic program could be called into question.

=== Reactions to the exclusion of women's events ===
The absence of women's Nordic combined events from the program of the Milan Cortina 2026 Winter Olympics has sparked numerous reactions among the athletes involved. In particular, American skier Annika Malacinski expressed her disappointment, stating that the exclusion of women's Nordic combined from the Olympic program has effectively deprived her of any future prospect of participating in the Olympic Games because of her gender. Her teammate Alexa Brabec also expressed hope that the discipline will be included in the women's Olympic program in the future, specifically citing the support shown by the French Ski Federation and several other stakeholders for the introduction of women’s events by the 2030 Games.

The lack of an Olympic competition has also led some athletes, such as Tara Geraghty-Moats, to turn to other disciplines in order to fulfill their Olympic dream. Italian athlete Annika Sieff, together with other competitors, even drew a beard on her face in an attempt to raise awareness and prompt change, but without success.

Male athletes have also reacted, with some expressing broader concerns about the Olympic future of the sport. Norwegian athlete Jarl Magnus Riiber, a five-time overall World Cup champion and team silver medalist at the 2018 Winter Olympics, highlighted the potential consequences that the removal of Nordic combined from the Olympic program could have on all Nordic sports. In particular, he argued that such a decision would weaken not only Nordic combined, but also ski jumping and cross-country skiing, due to the structural links between these disciplines.

In this context, various stakeholders in Nordic combined (national federations, coaches, and athletes) have launched initiatives to improve the sport's visibility and development. These include the gradual increase in the number of international participants and efforts to boost media exposure (such as the production of the documentary series The Overlooked and a stronger presence on social media). The French Ski Federation has also taken part in this effort, collaborating with the International Ski Federation to promote the inclusion of women's events in the Olympic program from 2030 onward, although it does not have decision-making power over the composition of the Olympic program.

One week before the start of the Games, in reaction to their exclusion from the Olympic program, Nordic combined athletes expressed their dissatisfaction during the sixth stage of the 2025–2026 World Cup, held in Seefeld, by raising their crossed ski poles before the start of each race.

== Venues ==
The ski jumping events take place at the Giuseppe Dal Ben Ski Jumping Arena in Predazzo, while the cross-country skiing events are held at the Cross country and biathlon center Fabio Canal at Tesero; the two venues are located 10 kilometres (6.2 mi) apart.

Both facilities are symbols and icons of Italian Nordic skiing, also because they are both crossed by the course of the Marcialonga, an internationally renowned cross-country race held annually in Val di Fiemme. These venues have undergone significant modernization works in preparation for the Olympic Games. In Predazzo, in addition to the complete renovation of the ski jumps, further adjustments were made—particularly to the take-off angle and the inrun track—following several serious injuries during the inaugural competitions held before the Olympic Games.

These two venues also host the Olympic ski jumping and cross-country skiing events, as well as Paralympic cross-country skiing and para biathlon at the 2026 Paralympic Games.

== Competition schedule ==
The following is the competition schedule for all three events.

All times are (UTC+1).

Date	Time	Event
11 February	10:00	Men's individual normal hill
11 February	13:45	Men's individual 10 km
17 February	10:00	Men's individual large hill
17 February	13:45	Men's individual 10 km
19 February	10:00	Men's team large hill
19 February	14:00	Men's team relay 2 x 7.5 km

== Medal summary ==
=== Medal table ===
Rank	Nation	Gold	Silver	Bronze	Total
1	Norway	3	0	0	3
2	Austria	0	2	1	3
3	Finland	0	1	2	3
Totals (3 entries)		3	3	3	9

=== Medalists ===
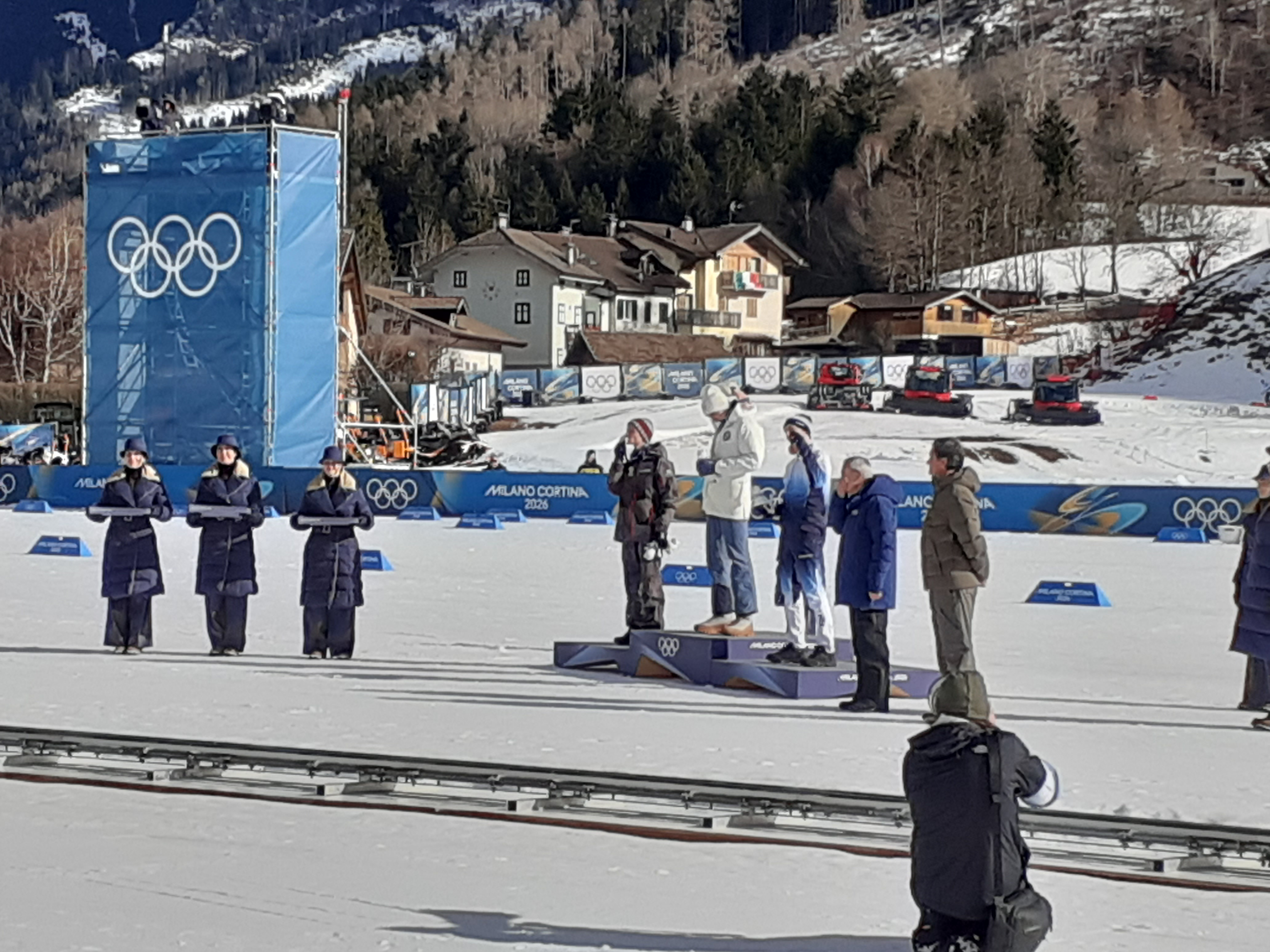
Medal ceremony for the large hill event

Event	Gold		Silver		Bronze	
Individual large hill/10 km	Jens Lurås Oftebro; Norway	24:45.0	Johannes Lamparter; Austria	24:50.9	Ilkka Herola; Finland	24:59.8
Individual normal hill/10 km	Jens Lurås Oftebro; Norway	29:59.4	Johannes Lamparter; Austria	30:00.4	Eero Hirvonen; Finland	30:01.9
Team large hill/2 x 7.5 km	Norway; Andreas Skoglund; Jens Lurås Oftebro	41:18.0	Finland; Ilkka Herola; Eero Hirvonen	41:18.5	Austria; Stefan Rettenegger; Johannes Lamparter	41:40.3

== Participating nations ==
A total of 36 athletes (all men) from 15 nations qualified to participate.
