= Ski jumping at the 2026 Winter Olympics – Qualification =

The following is about the qualification rules and the quota allocation for the ski jumping events at the 2026 Winter Olympics.

== Qualification rules ==
=== Minimum standards ===
Athletes must have at least 1 career World Cup or Grand Prix point, or have 1 Continental Cup point during the qualification timeline (1 July 2024 – 18 January 2026). Athletes who have qualified in Nordic combined may participate in the team events, with a limit to one per National Olympic Committee (NOC). The host, Italy, will be allowed to enter at least one male and one female competitor provided they meet minimum standards. To participate in the men's super team event, and the mixed team event, they must earn the required quotas through the process below.

=== Quotas ===
The quotas will be allocated using the Olympic Quota Allocation List, which is first made up of World Cup and Summer Grand Prix events from 1 July 2024, until 18 January 2026. Then, if there are no athletes remaining on the list, Continental Cup results from the same time period are used. The allocation will be made by assigning one quota place per athlete from the top of the standings downwards until the total of 46 male and 48 female athletes is reached, including the host country. During this allocation nations may qualify 3 male (four if the 4th is ranked in the top 25 of the Olympic Quota Allocation List) and 4 female competitors. An additional 4 quotas in men's competition (bringing the total to 50) will be granted to nations who have either not qualified a male competitor yet, or need one more quota to enter the men's super team event. The final two female quotas (bringing the total to 50) will be allocated to first to allow nations to compete in the mixed team event, then to nations who do not yet have a female competitor.

=== Team events ===
To participate in these events each nation must qualify two male (for both events), and two female (for the mixed team event) athletes through the process above. However, if the NOC does not have the required two male athletes they may use one competitor who has qualified in Nordic combined. China was able to enter both team events in this manner.

== Quota allocation ==
Final allocation were published on 19 January 2026. Reallocations followed that, where noted.

=== Current standings ===
NOC	Athletes				Total
NOC	Men	Women	Men's team	Mixed team	Total
Austria	4	4	X	X	8
Bulgaria	1				1
Canada	1	3			4
China	1	4			5
Czech Republic	1	3			4
Estonia	2		X		2
Finland	3	4	X	X	7
France	3	~~3~~ 2	X	X	5
Germany	4	4	X	X	8
Italy	3	4	X	X	7
Japan	3	4	X	X	7
Kazakhstan	2		X		2
Norway	3	4	X	X	7
Poland	3	2	X	X	5
Romania	2	2	X	X	4
Slovakia	1	1			2
Slovenia	3	4	X	X	7
Sweden		1			1
Switzerland	3	~~2~~ 1	X		4
Turkey	2		X		2
Ukraine	2		X		2
United States	3	3	X	X	6
Total: 22 NOCs	50	50	16 (Note: China used a Nordic combined athlete to enter both team events making the entry totals 17 and 12.)	11	100

=== Next eligible NOC per event ===
A country can be eligible for more than one quota spot per event in the reallocation process. Only the first five spots are listed. Bolded NOCs have accepted a reallocated quota.

Men's	Women's
Norway; Japan; Poland; Slovenia; Switzerland	**China**; **Slovakia**; Poland; Slovakia; Ukraine
