= Ski jumping at the 2026 Winter Olympics – Women's normal hill individual =

Women's normal hill individual at the XXV Olympic Winter Games
- Ski jumping
- Venue: Predazzo Ski Jumping Stadium, Predazzo
- Date: 7 February 2026
- Winning points: 267.3

Medalists
1st place, gold medalist(s)		Anna Odine Strøm	Norway
2nd place, silver medalist(s)		Nika Prevc	Slovenia
3rd place, bronze medalist(s)		Nozomi Maruyama	Japan

The women's normal hill individual competition of the 2026 Olympics was held on 7 February, at the Predazzo Ski Jumping Stadium in Predazzo. Anna Odine Strøm of Norway won the competition. Nika Prevc of Slovenia became the silver medalist, and Nozomi Maruyama of Japan won bronze. For all of them, these were their first Olympic medals.

== Background ==
The 2022 Olympic champion, Urša Bogataj, retired. The silver medalist, Katharina Schmid (who was also the 2018 silver medalist), and the bronze medalist, Nika Vodan, qualified for the Olympics. Before the Olympics, Nika Prevc was leading the 2025–26 FIS Ski Jumping World Cup ranking, having won 14 out of 24 events. She was also the 2025 World champion on the normal hill.

== Schedule ==
=== Official training ===
GMT	Date	Event	Round	Country	Winner	Distance
17:00 PM	5 February 2026	Official training 1	R1	Slovenia	Nika Prevc	98.0 m (321.5 ft)
17:00 PM	5 February 2026	Official training 1	R2	Slovenia	Nika Prevc	100.5 m (330 ft)
17:00 PM	5 February 2026	Official training 1	R3	Austria	Lisa Eder	102.5 m (336 ft)
9:00 AM	6 February 2026	Official training 2	R1	Slovenia	Nika Prevc	108.0 m (354.3 ft)
9:00 AM	6 February 2026	Official training 2	R2	Slovenia	Nika Prevc	105.0 m (344.5 ft)
9:00 AM	6 February 2026	Official training 2	R3	Norway	Eirin Maria Kvandal	100.0 m (328.1 ft)

=== Competition ===
GMT	Date	Event	Round	Country	Winner	Distance
17:45 PM	7 February 2026	Trial round	TR	Slovenia	Nika Prevc	103.0 m (337.9 ft)
18:45 PM	7 February 2026	1st round	1R	Norway	Anna Odine Strøm	100.0 m (328.1 ft)
19:57 PM	7 February 2026	Final round	2R	Norway	Anna Odine Strøm	101.0 m (331.4 ft)

== Results ==
=== Final ===
The final will be held on 7 February at 18:45.

Rank	Bib	Name	Country	Round 1			Final round			Total
Rank	Bib	Name	Country	Distance (m)	Points	Rank	Distance (m)	Points	Rank	Points
1st place, gold medalist(s)	47	Anna Odine Strøm	Norway	100.0	136.9	1	101.0	130.4	1	267.3
2nd place, silver medalist(s)	50	Nika Prevc	Slovenia	98.0	135.9	2	99.5	130.3	2	266.2
3rd place, bronze medalist(s)	49	Nozomi Maruyama	Japan	97.0	135.7	3	100.0	126.1	4	261.8
4	48	Lisa Eder	Austria	95.0	130.4	5	100.0	126.9	3	257.3
5	39	Eirin Maria Kvandal	Norway	99.5	131.9	4	98.0	123.0	5	254.9
6	40	Heidi Dyhre Traaserud	Norway	96.0	128.2	6	99.0	120.4	7	248.6
7	46	Selina Freitag	Germany	94.5	123.2	11	97.5	121.5	6	244.7
8	41	Nika Vodan	Slovenia	95.0	126.3	7	94.5	116.2	14	242.5
9	44	Agnes Reisch	Germany	92.0	123.4	9	93.0	117.9	9	241.3
10	29	Anna Twardosz	Poland	96.0	124.0	8	93.5	116.5	13	240.5
11	45	Abigail Strate	Canada	93.5	122.7	12	95.5	117.7	10	240.4
12	33	Silje Opseth	Norway	101.0	120.0	15	98.5	119.3	8	239.3
13	42	Sara Takanashi	Japan	92.0	121.5	14	96.0	117.4	12	238.9
14	37	Yūka Setō	Japan	95.0	123.4	9	92.5	114.4	17	237.8
15	36	Zeng Ping	China	99.0	122.6	13	95.0	114.7	16	237.3
16	43	Katharina Schmid	Germany	89.0	116.4	18	97.5	117.7	10	234.1
17	35	Yuki Ito	Japan	92.5	117.3	17	95.5	111.3	20	228.6
18	22	Anežka Indráčková	Czech Republic	94.0	111.6	25	96.0	115.4	15	227.0
19	32	Annika Sieff	Italy	96.0	114.1	22	99.0	112.5	18	226.6
19	17	Nicole Maurer	Canada	98.5	116.3	19	96.5	110.3	22	226.6
21	27	Annika Belshaw	United States	93.5	118.5	16	93.0	106.9	15	225.4
22	38	Julia Mühlbacher	Austria	93.0	115.3	21	98.0	109.6	23	224.9
23	24	Paige Jones	United States	95.0	112.2	24	97.0	110.4	21	222.6
24	6	Lisa Hirner	Austria	93.0	108.6	30	98.5	112.5	18	221.1
25	18	Heta Hirvonen	Finland	94.5	111.6	25	94.0	107.6	24	219.2
26	16	Liu Qi	China	96.0	115.9	20	93.0	101.5	29	217.4
27	26	Josie Johnson	United States	91.5	109.9	28	92.5	106.5	26	216.4
28	23	Sina Arnet	Switzerland	94.0	113.6	23	94.0	101.7	28	215.3
29	28	Joséphine Pagnier	France	91.0	111.2	27	92.0	103.1	27	214.3
30	13	Daniela Vasilica Toth	Romania	92.0	109.2	29	92.0	98.2	30	207.4
31	14	Minja Korhonen	Finland	91.5	107.8	31	did not advance			
32	34	Juliane Seyfarth	Germany	88.0	106.9	32	did not advance			
32	21	Maja Kovačič	Slovenia	92.0	106.9	32	did not advance			
34	25	Katra Komar	Slovenia	91.0	106.6	34	did not advance			
35	9	Meghann Wadsak	Austria	91.5	106.1	35	did not advance			
36	15	Martina Zanitzer	Italy	92.0	106.0	36	did not advance			
37	31	Jenny Rautionaho	Finland	92.0	105.6	37	did not advance			
38	20	Klára Ulrichová	Czech Republic	91.5	104.9	38	did not advance			
39	2	Jessica Malsiner	Italy	91.0	104.3	39	did not advance			
40	8	Weng Yangning	China	91.5	102.7	40	did not advance			
41	11	Kira Mária Kapustíková	Slovakia	89.0	100.9	41	did not advance			
42	30	Frida Westman	Sweden	87.0	94.8	42	did not advance			
43	7	Emma Chervet	France	84.5	94.1	43	did not advance			
44	12	Sofia Mattila	Finland	86.0	93.0	44	did not advance			
45	19	Dong Bing	China	87.5	92.7	45	did not advance			
46	4	Martina Ambrosi	Italy	85.0	90.8	46	did not advance			
47	1	Veronika Jenčová	Czech Republic	80.5	78.4	47	did not advance			
48	5	Delia Anamaria Folea	Romania	79.5	78.3	48	did not advance			
49	3	Natalie Eilers	Canada	77.5	74.4	49	did not advance			
50	10	Pola Bełtowska	Poland	78.0	73.7	50	did not advance			
