= Ski jumping at the 2026 Winter Olympics – Women's large hill individual =

Women's large hill individual at the XXV Olympic Winter Games
- Ski jumping
- Venue: Predazzo Ski Jumping Stadium, Predazzo
- Date: 15 February 2026
- Winning points: 284.8

Medalists
| 1st place, gold medalist(s) | | Anna Odine Strøm | Norway |
| 2nd place, silver medalist(s) | | Eirin Maria Kvandal | Norway |
| 3rd place, bronze medalist(s) | | Nika Prevc | Slovenia |

The women's large hill individual competition of the 2026 Olympics was held on 15 February, at the Predazzo Ski Jumping Stadium in Predazzo. This was the inaugural edition of this event. Anna Odine Strøm of Norway won the event, adding this win to her gold medal on the normal hill a few days earlier. Her teammate Eirin Maria Kvandal won the silver medal, her first individual Olympic medal, and Nika Prevc of Slovenia won the bronze medal.

== Background ==
Before the Olympics, Nika Prevc was leading the 2025–26 FIS Ski Jumping World Cup ranking, having won 14 out of 24 events. She was also the 2025 World champion on the large hill.

== Schedule ==
=== Official training ===
| GMT | Date | Event | Round | Country | Winner | Distance |
|---|---|---|---|---|---|---|
| 17:00 PM | 12 February 2026 | Official training 1 | R1 | Japan | Yuki Ito | 138.0 m (452.8 ft) |
| 17:00 PM | 12 February 2026 | Official training 1 | R2 | Slovenia | Nika Prevc | 134.0 m (439.6 ft) |
| 17:00 PM | 12 February 2026 | Official training 1 | R3 | Norway | Eirin Maria Kvandal | 130.5 m (428 ft) |
| 9:00 AM | 14 February 2022 | Official training 2 | R1 | Norway | Eirin Maria Kvandal | 130.0 m (426.5 ft) |
| 9:00 AM | 14 February 2022 | Official training 2 | R2 | Norway | Eirin Maria Kvandal | 132.0 m (433.1 ft) |
| 9:00 AM | 14 February 2022 | Official training 2 | R3 | Slovenia | Nika Prevc | 130.5 m (428 ft) |

=== Competition ===
| GMT | Date | Event | Round | Country | Winner | Distance |
|---|---|---|---|---|---|---|
| 17:30 AM | 15 February 2022 | Trial round | TR | Norway | Eirin Maria Kvandal | 131.0 m (429.8 ft) |
| 18:45 AM | 15 February 2022 | 1st round | 1R | Norway | Eirin Maria Kvandal | 129.0 m (423.2 ft) |
| 19:57 PM | 15 February 2022 | Final round | 2R | Norway | Anna Odine Strøm | 132.0 m (433.1 ft) |

== Results ==
=== Final ===
The final was held on 15 February at 18:45.

| Rank | Bib | Name | Country | Round 1 | | | Final round | | | Total |
| Rank | Bib | Name | Country | Distance (m) | Points | Rank | Distance (m) | Points | Rank | Points |
|---|---|---|---|---|---|---|---|---|---|---|
| 1st place, gold medalist(s) | 47 | Anna Odine Strøm | Norway | 130.5 | 136.7 | 2 | 132.0 | 148.1 | 1 | 284.8 |
| 2nd place, silver medalist(s) | 39 | Eirin Maria Kvandal | Norway | 129.0 | 140.6 | 1 | 133.5 | 142.1 | 3 | 282.7 |
| 3rd place, bronze medalist(s) | 50 | Nika Prevc | Slovenia | 128.0 | 128.3 | 5 | 127.5 | 143.2 | 2 | 271.5 |
| 4 | 30 | Frida Westman | Sweden | 129.5 | 126.0 | 6 | 127.5 | 139.4 | 5 | 265.4 |
| 5 | 33 | Silje Opseth | Norway | 126.5 | 131.8 | 3 | 125.5 | 130.8 | 9 | 262.6 |
| 6 | 40 | Heidi Dyhre Traaserud | Norway | 124.5 | 129.6 | 4 | 119.5 | 129.5 | 10 | 259.1 |
| 7 | 48 | Lisa Eder | Austria | 125.5 | 116.0 | 15 | 132.0 | 141.6 | 4 | 257.6 |
| 8 | 49 | Nozomi Maruyama | Japan | 128.0 | 125.6 | 7 | 125.0 | 131.4 | 8 | 257.0 |
| 9 | 41 | Nika Vodan | Slovenia | 112.0 | 117.9 | 12 | 129.5 | 137.0 | 6 | 254.9 |
| 10 | 44 | Agnes Reisch | Germany | 111.0 | 116.2 | 13 | 123.0 | 128.0 | 11 | 244.2 |
| 11 | 45 | Abigail Strate | Canada | 117.0 | 106.9 | 26 | 131.5 | 136.7 | 7 | 243.6 |
| 12 | 31 | Jenny Rautionaho | Finland | 118.5 | 120.4 | 10 | 121.5 | 119.5 | 15 | 239.9 |
| 13 | 32 | Annika Sieff | Italy | 118.0 | 119.2 | 11 | 119.5 | 120.1 | 14 | 239.3 |
| 14 | 35 | Yuki Ito | Japan | 119.5 | 122.0 | 8 | 117.5 | 114.9 | 19 | 236.9 |
| 15 | 37 | Yūka Setō | Japan | 115.5 | 116.1 | 14 | 118.5 | 119.1 | 16 | 235.2 |
| 16 | 42 | Sara Takanashi | Japan | 114.0 | 114.1 | 17 | 127.5 | 120.4 | 13 | 234.5 |
| 17 | 46 | Selina Freitag | Germany | 115.5 | 103.0 | 28 | 124.0 | 126.7 | 12 | 229.7 |
| 18 | 6 | Lisa Hirner | Austria | 120.5 | 111.3 | 18 | 124.0 | 115.9 | 18 | 227.2 |
| 19 | 21 | Maja Kovačič | Slovenia | 122.0 | 109.6 | 20 | 124.0 | 116.7 | 17 | 226.3 |
| 20 | 17 | Nicole Maurer | Canada | 121.5 | 107.7 | 23 | 126.0 | 114.9 | 19 | 222.6 |
| 21 | 36 | Zeng Ping | China | 117.0 | 114.5 | 16 | 133.0* | 105.4 | 24 | 219.9 |
| 22 | 38 | Julia Mühlbacher | Austria | 114.5 | 110.1 | 19 | 118.0 | 107.9 | 22 | 218.0 |
| 23 | 34 | Juliane Seyfarth | Germany | 119.0 | 121.0 | 9 | 109.0 | 96.2 | 27 | 217.2 |
| 24 | 18 | Heta Hirvonen | Finland | 120.5 | 104.1 | 27 | 114.0 | 109.3 | 21 | 213.4 |
| 25 | 15 | Martina Zanitzer | Italy | 122.0 | 107.0 | 25 | 115.0 | 106.1 | 23 | 213.1 |
| 26 | 16 | Liu Qi | China | 118.5 | 108.2 | 22 | 119.0 | 102.4 | 25 | 210.6 |
| 27 | 22 | Anežka Indráčková | Czech Republic | 125.0 | 107.3 | 24 | 116.0 | 100.2 | 26 | 207.5 |
| 28 | 24 | Paige Jones | United States | 116.0 | 97.9 | 30 | 101.5 | 84.8 | 28 | 182.7 |
| 29 | 26 | Josie Johnson | United States | 125.5 | 109.0 | 21 | Did not start | | | 109.0 |
| 30 | 19 | Dong Bing | China | 113.5 | 97.5 | 31 | Did not advance | | | |
| 31 | 4 | Jessica Malsiner | Italy | 113.0 | 93.9 | 32 | Did not advance | | | |
| 32 | 23 | Sina Arnet | Switzerland | 117.5 | 93.6 | 33 | Did not advance | | | |
| 33 | 28 | Joséphine Pagnier | France | 118.0 | 93.3 | 34 | Did not advance | | | |
| 34 | 13 | Daniela Toth | Romania | 112.5 | 93.3 | 35 | Did not advance | | | |
| 35 | 29 | Anna Twardosz | Poland | 115.0 | 93.1 | 36 | Did not advance | | | |
| 36 | 14 | Minja Korhonen | Finland | 115.0 | 90.6 | 37 | Did not advance | | | |
| 37 | 9 | Meghann Wadsak | Austria | 114.5 | 90.4 | 38 | Did not advance | | | |
| 38 | 25 | Katra Komar | Slovenia | 114.0 | 90.2 | 39 | Did not advance | | | |
| 39 | 12 | Sofia Mattila | Finland | 109.0 | 86.2 | 40 | Did not advance | | | |
| 40 | 10 | Pola Bełtowska | Poland | 108.0 | 83.4 | 41 | Did not advance | | | |
| 41 | 43 | Katharina Schmid | Germany | 96.5 | 83.2 | 42 | Did not advance | | | |
| 42 | 20 | Klára Ulrichová | Czech Republic | 104.5 | 80.5 | 43 | Did not advance | | | |
| 43 | 11 | Kira Mária Kapustíková | Slovakia | 105.5 | 79.7 | 44 | Did not advance | | | |
| 44 | 8 | Weng Yangning | China | 108.0 | 75.8 | 45 | Did not advance | | | |
| 45 | 7 | Emma Chervet | France | 104.0 | 75.3 | 46 | Did not advance | | | |
| 46 | 1 | Delia Folea | Romania | 87.0 | 42.6 | 47 | Did not advance | | | |
| DNS | 2 | Martina Ambrosi | Italy | Did not start | | | | | | |
| DNS | 3 | Natalie Eilers | Canada | Did not start | | | | | | |
| DNS | 5 | Veronika Jenčová | Czech Republic | Did not start | | | | | | |
| DSQ | 27 | Annika Belshaw | United States | Disqualified (Note: Belshaw was disqualified due to the improper size of her skis (they were too long).) | | | | | | |
Official results
