= China at the 2026 Winter Olympics =

- Flag of China
- IOC code: CHN
- NOC: Chinese Olympic Committee
- Website: www.olympic.cn (in Chinese and English)

in Milan and Cortina d'Ampezzo, Italy 6 February 2026 – 22 February 2026
- Competitors: 125 (57 men and 68 women) in 15 sports
- Flag bearers (opening): Ning Zhongyan & Zhang Chutong
- Flag bearer (closing): Su Yiming
- Medals Ranked 12th: Gold 5 Silver 4 Bronze 6 Total 15

Winter Olympics appearances (overview)
- 1980; 1984; 1988; 1992; 1994; 1998; 2002; 2006; 2010; 2014; 2018; 2022; 2026

China competed at the 2026 Winter Olympics in Milan and Cortina d'Ampezzo, Italy, from 6 to 22 February 2026.

China finished the 2026 Games with 15 medals, including 5 gold medals, 4 silver medals and 6 bronze medals, surpassing the results of the 2010 Games and setting a new record for the Chinese delegation in overseas Winter Olympics. The 15 medals also tied the medal record of the 2022 Games.

== Competitors ==
The following is the list of number of competitors participating at the Games per sport/discipline.

Sport	Men	Women	Total
Alpine skiing	1	1	2
Biathlon	1	2	3
Bobsleigh	8	4	12
Cross-country skiing	2	4	6
Curling	5	5	10
Figure skating	3	3	6
Freestyle skiing	8	16	24
Luge	3	3	6
Nordic combined	2	—N/a	2
Short-track speed skating	5	5	10
Skeleton	3	2	5
Ski jumping	1	4	5
Ski mountaineering	1	1	2
Snowboarding	7	10	17
Speed skating	7	8	15
Total	57	68	125

== Medalists ==
Medal	Name	Sport	Event	Date
Gold	Su Yiming	Snowboarding	Men's slopestyle	18 February
Gold	Xu Mengtao	Freestyle skiing	Women's aerials	18 February
Gold	Ning Zhongyan	Speed skating	Men's 1500 m	19 February
Gold	Wang Xindi	Freestyle skiing	Men's aerials	20 February
Gold	Eileen Gu	Freestyle skiing	Women's halfpipe	22 February
Silver	Eileen Gu	Freestyle skiing	Women's slopestyle	9 February
Silver	Sun Long	Short-track speed skating	Men's 1000 m	12 February
Silver	Eileen Gu	Freestyle skiing	Women's big air	16 February
Silver	Li Fanghui	Freestyle skiing	Women's halfpipe	22 February
Bronze	Su Yiming	Snowboarding	Men's big air	7 February
Bronze	Ning Zhongyan	Speed skating	Men's 1000 m	11 February
Bronze	Li Wenhao; Liu Hanbin; Ning Zhongyan; Wu Yu	Speed skating	Men's team pursuit	17 February
Bronze	Shao Qi	Freestyle skiing	Women's aerials	18 February
Bronze	Li Tianma	Freestyle skiing	Men's aerials	20 February
Bronze	Xu Mengtao; Wang Xindi; Li Tianma	Freestyle skiing	Mixed team aerials	21 February

Medals by date
Day	Date	1st place, gold medalist(s)	2nd place, silver medalist(s)	3rd place, bronze medalist(s)	Total
1	7 February	0	0	1	1
2	8 February	0	0	0	0
3	9 February	0	1	0	1
4	10 February	0	0	0	0
5	11 February	0	0	1	1
6	12 February	0	1	0	1
7	13 February	0	0	0	0
8	14 February	0	0	0	0
9	15 February	0	0	0	0
10	16 February	0	1	0	1
11	17 February	0	0	1	1
12	18 February	2	0	1	3
13	19 February	1	0	0	1
14	20 February	1	0	1	2
15	21 February	0	0	1	1
16	22 February	1	1	0	2
Total		5	4	6	15

Medals by sport
Sport	1st place, gold medalist(s)	2nd place, silver medalist(s)	3rd place, bronze medalist(s)	Total
Freestyle skiing	3	3	3	9
Speed skating	1	0	2	3
Snowboarding	1	0	1	2
Short-track speed skating	0	1	0	1
Total	5	4	6	15

Medals by gender
Gender	1st place, gold medalist(s)	2nd place, silver medalist(s)	3rd place, bronze medalist(s)	Total
Male	3	1	4	8
Female	2	3	1	6
Mixed	0	0	1	1
Total	5	4	6	15

Multiple medalists
Name	Sport	1st place, gold medalist(s)	2nd place, silver medalist(s)	3rd place, bronze medalist(s)	Total
Eileen Gu	Freestyle skiing	1	2	0	3
Ning Zhongyan	Speed skating	1	0	2	3
Su Yiming	Snowboarding	1	0	1	2
Wang Xindi	Freestyle skiing	1	0	1	2
Xu Mengtao	Freestyle skiing	1	0	1	2
Li Tianma	Freestyle skiing	0	0	2	2

== Alpine skiing ==
China qualified one female and one male alpine skier through the basic quota.

Athlete	Event	Run 1		Run 2		Total	
Athlete	Event	Time	Rank	Time	Rank	Time	Rank
Liu Xiaochen	Men's giant slalom	1:29.45	66	1:20.96	54	2:50.41	58
Liu Xiaochen	Men's slalom	DNF					
Zhang Yuying	Women's giant slalom	1:22.49	61	1:30.72	54	2:53.21	54
Zhang Yuying	Women's slalom	1:02.72	60	DNF			

== Biathlon ==
Athlete	Event	Time	Misses	Rank
Chu Yuanmeng	Women's individual	46:33.9	3 (1+1+0+1)	54
Chu Yuanmeng	Women's sprint	22:32.7	0 (0+0)	31
Chu Yuanmeng	Women's pursuit	33:21.4	1 (0+1+0+0)	31
Meng Fanqi	Women's individual	44:37.0	1 (0+1+0+0)	26
Meng Fanqi	Women's sprint	22:59.8	1 (0+1)	48
Meng Fanqi	Women's pursuit	34:01.6	1 (0+0+0+1)	39
Yan Xingyuan	Men's individual	59:01.5	3 (0+0+2+1)	57
Yan Xingyuan	Men's sprint	26:08.8	2 (0+2)	64

== Bobsleigh ==
Men

Athlete	Event	Run 1		Run 2		Run 3		Run 4		Total	
Athlete	Event	Time	Rank	Time	Rank	Time	Rank	Time	Rank	Time	Rank
Li Chunjian*; Ye Jielong	Two-man	55.99	15	56.30	20	56.36	23	55.94	14	3:44.59	17
Sun Kaizhi*; An Tai	Two-man	56.15	16	56.16	=15	55.83	13	56.03	16	3:44.17	16
Li Chunjian*; Jiang Maoyuan; Ding Yunda; Ye Jielong	Four-man	55.07	18	55.36	20	55.22	=17	55.22	17	3:40.87	18
Sun Kaizhi*; An Tai; Shi Yaolong; Zhang Jin	Four-man	55.05	=16	55.21	15	54.97	=12	55.13	15	3:40.36	16

Women

Athlete	Event	Run 1		Run 2		Run 3		Run 4		Total	
Athlete	Event	Time	Rank	Time	Rank	Time	Rank	Time	Rank	Time	Rank
Huai Mingming	Monobob	1:00.41	15	1:01.00	24	59.95	11	59.98	14	4:01.34	16
Ying Qing	Monobob	1:00.28	12	1:00.31	12	1:00.37	16	1:00.13	18	4:01.09	12
Huai Mingming*; Wang Xuan	Two-woman	57.60	13	57.60	=7	58.22	14	58.02	13	3:51.44	=11
Ying Qing*; Wang Yu	Two-woman	58.03	=20	57.96	19	58.50	19	Did not advance		2:54.49	22

== Cross-country skiing ==
China qualified one female and one male cross-country skier through the basic quota.

Distance

Athlete	Event	Classical		Freestyle		Final		
Athlete	Event	Time	Rank	Time	Rank	Time	Deficit	Rank
Li Minglin	Men's 10 km freestyle	—N/a				24:52.6	+4:16.4	78
Li Minglin	Men's 20 km skiathlon	27:50.6	66	LAP				65
Li Minglin	Men's 50 km classical	—N/a				LAP		45
Chi Chunxue	Women's 10 km freestyle	—N/a				26:52.0	+4:02.8	66
Chi Chunxue	Women's 20 km skiathlon	32:27.7	54	LAP				55
Chi Chunxue	Women's 50 km classical	—N/a				LAP		33
He Kaile	Women's 10 km freestyle	—N/a				27:27.7	+4:38.5	72
He Kaile	Women's 20 km skiathlon	34:25.7	64	LAP				64
He Kaile	Women's 50 km classical	—N/a				LAP		38
Dilnigar Ilhamjan	Women's 10 km freestyle	—N/a				28:10.5	+5:21.3	78
Dilnigar Ilhamjan	Women's 20 km skiathlon	35:41.1	68	LAP				68
Dilnigar Ilhamjan	Women's 50 km classical	—N/a				LAP		36
Wang Yundi	Women's 10 km freestyle	—N/a				27:41.6	+4:52.4	74
Wang Yundi	Women's 20 km skiathlon	34:14.1	63	LAP				62
Wang Yundi	Women's 50 km classical	—N/a				LAP		37
Chi Chunxue; He Kaile; Dilnigar Ilhamjan; Wang Yundi	Women's 4 × 7.5 km relay	—N/a				LAP		19

Sprint

Athlete	Event	Qualification		Quarterfinal		Semifinal		Final	
Athlete	Event	Time	Rank	Time	Rank	Time	Rank	Time	Rank
Li Minglin	Men's sprint	3:35.56	68	Did not advance					
Wang Qiang	Men's sprint	3:21.49	37	Did not advance					
Chi Chunxue	Women's sprint	4:15.62	69	Did not advance					
He Kaile	Women's sprint	4:30.88	84	Did not advance					
Dilnigar Ilhamjan	Women's sprint	4:02.99	53	Did not advance					
Wang Yundi	Women's sprint	4:24.95	78	Did not advance					
Wang Qiang; Li Minglin	Men's team sprint	6:12.91	19	—N/a				Did not advance	
Dilnigar Ilhamjan; Chi Chunxue	Women's team sprint	7:13.01	15 Q	—N/a				23:17.61	15

== Curling ==
Summary

Team	Event	Group stage										Semifinal	Final / BM	
Team	Event	Opposition Score	Opposition Score	Opposition Score	Opposition Score	Opposition Score	Opposition Score	Opposition Score	Opposition Score	Opposition Score	Rank	Opposition Score	Opposition Score	Rank
Xu Xiaoming; Fei Xueqing; Li Zhichao; Xu Jingtao; Wang Zhenhao	Men's tournament	GBR; L 4–9	NOR; L 6–8	SUI; L 7–9	SWE; L 4–6	CAN; L 3–6	ITA; W 11–4	USA; W 8–5	CZE; L 5–10	GER; L 4–6	10	Did not advance		
Wang Rui; Han Yu; Dong Ziqi; Jiang Jiayi; Su Tingyu	Women's tournament	GBR; W 7–4	SUI; L 5–7	ITA; W 8–7	USA; L 5–6	CAN; L 5–10	KOR; L 9–10	DEN; L 7–8	SWE; L 4–9	JPN; L 6–9	10	Did not advance		

=== Men's tournament ===
China qualified a men's team by finishing second at the Olympic Qualification Event. Team Xu Xiaoming was selected as the Chinese representatives.

Final Round Robin Standings
Team	Skip	Pld	W	L	W–L	PF	PA	EW	EL	BE	SE	S%	DSC	Qualification
Switzerland	Yannick Schwaller	9	9	0	–	75	40	42	30	3	8	88.7%	9.506	Playoffs
Canada	Brad Jacobs	9	7	2	–	63	45	40	28	8	13	86.5%	28.844	Playoffs
Norway	Magnus Ramsfjell	9	5	4	1–0	60	61	37	38	6	7	80.8%	26.938	Playoffs
Great Britain	Bruce Mouat	9	5	4	0–1	63	48	39	33	2	10	86.4%	16.613	Playoffs
United States	Daniel Casper	9	4	5	1–1	52	65	34	37	5	3	81.7%	17.663	
Italy	Joël Retornaz	9	4	5	1–1	58	67	33	39	6	7	83.0%	17.869	
Germany	Marc Muskatewitz	9	4	5	1–1	51	57	36	37	8	7	84.4%	24.850	
Czech Republic	Lukáš Klíma	9	3	6	–	54	63	35	41	3	5	79.8%	29.013	
Sweden	Niklas Edin	9	2	7	1–0	44	63	31	39	6	3	82.5%	26.000	
China	Xu Xiaoming	9	2	7	0–1	52	63	35	40	3	5	81.4%	34.875	

Source: Official website

Round robin
China had a bye in draws 2, 6 and 10.

Draw 1
Wednesday, 11 February, 19:05

Sheet D	1	2	3	4	5	6	7	8	9	10	Final
China (Xu)	0	1	0	1	0	1	0	1	0	X	4
Great Britain (Mouat) 🔨	1	0	3	0	1	0	3	0	1	X	9

Draw 3
Friday, 13 February, 9:05

Sheet C	1	2	3	4	5	6	7	8	9	10	11	Final
China (Xu)	0	2	0	1	0	1	0	1	0	1	0	6
Norway (Ramsfjell) 🔨	0	0	2	0	2	0	1	0	1	0	2	8

Draw 4
Friday, 13 February, 19:05

Sheet A	1	2	3	4	5	6	7	8	9	10	Final
Switzerland (Schwaller)	0	2	0	3	0	1	0	1	1	1	9
China (Xu) 🔨	2	0	1	0	2	0	2	0	0	0	7

Draw 5
Saturday, 14 February, 14:05

Sheet B	1	2	3	4	5	6	7	8	9	10	Final
Sweden (Edin) 🔨	2	0	0	1	0	0	1	0	2	0	6
China (Xu)	0	1	0	0	1	0	0	1	0	1	4

Draw 7
Sunday, 15 February, 19:05

Sheet A	1	2	3	4	5	6	7	8	9	10	Final
China (Xu)	0	0	0	0	2	0	0	0	1	X	3
Canada (Jacobs) 🔨	0	0	1	1	0	2	0	2	0	X	6

Draw 8
Monday, 16 February, 14:05

Sheet D	1	2	3	4	5	6	7	8	9	10	Final
Italy (Retornaz) 🔨	0	0	0	2	0	2	0	X	X	X	4
China (Xu)	1	2	1	0	4	0	3	X	X	X	11

Draw 9
Tuesday, 17 February, 9:05

Sheet C	1	2	3	4	5	6	7	8	9	10	Final
United States (Casper) 🔨	0	1	0	1	0	0	0	0	3	0	5
China (Xu)	0	0	1	0	0	1	0	3	0	3	8

Draw 11
Wednesday, 18 February, 14:05

Sheet B	1	2	3	4	5	6	7	8	9	10	Final
China (Xu)	0	0	2	0	2	0	1	0	0	X	5
Czech Republic (Klíma) 🔨	2	1	0	2	0	2	0	2	1	X	10

Draw 12
Thursday, 19 February, 9:05

Sheet C	1	2	3	4	5	6	7	8	9	10	Final
China (Xu) 🔨	0	1	0	0	1	0	1	0	1	0	4
Germany (Muskatewitz)	1	0	2	0	0	1	0	1	0	1	6

=== Women's tournament ===
China qualified a women's team by finishing in the top seven based on the combined points at the 2024 and 2025 World Championships. Team Wang Rui was selected as the Chinese representatives.

Final Round Robin Standings
Team	Skip	Pld	W	L	W–L	PF	PA	EW	EL	BE	SE	S%	DSC	Qualification
Sweden	Anna Hasselborg	9	7	2	–	65	50	45	32	5	14	81.7%	25.806	Playoffs
United States	Tabitha Peterson	9	6	3	2–0	60	54	40	37	3	13	82.1%	34.288	Playoffs
Switzerland	Silvana Tirinzoni	9	6	3	1–1	60	51	35	42	6	4	85.0%	44.338	Playoffs
Canada	Rachel Homan	9	6	3	0–2	76	59	45	38	2	9	80.3%	19.781	Playoffs
South Korea	Gim Eun-ji	9	5	4	1–0	60	53	37	35	8	11	81.2%	23.581	
Great Britain	Sophie Jackson	9	5	4	0–1	58	58	36	36	10	8	83.4%	16.938	
Denmark	Madeleine Dupont	9	4	5	–	49	58	36	38	3	11	77.0%	37.875	
Japan	Sayaka Yoshimura	9	2	7	1–1	51	69	35	43	3	6	78.6%	27.513	
Italy	Stefania Constantini	9	2	7	1–1	47	60	34	40	3	4	78.8%	34.719	
China	Wang Rui	9	2	7	1–1	56	70	37	39	3	9	82.7%	41.206	

Source: Official website

Round robin
China had a bye in draws 1, 5 and 9.

Draw 2
Thursday, 12 February, 19:05

Sheet A	1	2	3	4	5	6	7	8	9	10	Final
China (Wang)	0	0	0	2	0	0	2	2	0	1	7
Great Britain (Jackson) 🔨	0	0	2	0	0	1	0	0	1	0	4

Draw 3
Friday, 13 February, 14:05

Sheet B	1	2	3	4	5	6	7	8	9	10	Final
China (Wang)	0	0	1	1	0	1	0	0	2	X	5
Switzerland (Tirinzoni) 🔨	0	1	0	0	2	0	3	1	0	X	7

Draw 4
Saturday, 14 February, 9:05

Sheet A	1	2	3	4	5	6	7	8	9	10	Final
Italy (Constantini)	0	1	0	2	0	1	0	3	0	0	7
China (Wang) 🔨	1	0	2	0	1	0	1	0	2	1	8

Draw 6
Sunday, 15 February, 14:05

Sheet D	1	2	3	4	5	6	7	8	9	10	Final
United States (Peterson)	0	0	1	0	0	2	0	1	1	1	6
China (Wang) 🔨	0	2	0	1	1	0	1	0	0	0	5

Draw 7
Monday, 16 February, 9:05

Sheet C	1	2	3	4	5	6	7	8	9	10	Final
China (Wang) 🔨	0	1	1	0	1	0	2	0	0	X	5
Canada (Homan)	0	0	0	4	0	3	0	2	1	X	10

Draw 8
Monday, 16 February, 19:05

Sheet B	1	2	3	4	5	6	7	8	9	10	Final
South Korea (Gim) 🔨	0	0	3	0	4	0	0	1	0	2	10
China (Wang)	0	0	0	2	0	3	1	0	3	0	9

Draw 10
Wednesday, 18 February, 9:05

Sheet A	1	2	3	4	5	6	7	8	9	10	Final
China (Wang)	0	1	0	1	1	2	1	0	1	0	7
Denmark (Dupont) 🔨	2	0	4	0	0	0	0	1	0	1	8

Draw 11
Wednesday, 18 February, 19:05

Sheet D	1	2	3	4	5	6	7	8	9	10	Final
China (Wang)	0	0	0	3	0	0	1	0	X	X	4
Sweden (Hasselborg) 🔨	0	2	2	0	1	1	0	3	X	X	9

Draw 12
Thursday, 19 February, 14:30

Sheet C	1	2	3	4	5	6	7	8	9	10	Final
Japan (Yoshimura)	0	0	2	2	0	1	0	1	1	2	9
China (Wang) 🔨	0	1	0	0	3	0	2	0	0	0	6

== Figure skating ==
In the 2025 World Figure Skating Championships in Boston, the United States, China secured one quota in each of men's singles. China earned one quota in women's singles, one quota in pairs, and one quota in ice dance at the ISU Skate to Milano Figure Skating Qualifier 2025 in Beijing, China. Furthermore, China qualified to the team event.

Athlete	Event	SP/SD		FP/FD		Total	
Athlete	Event	Points	Rank	Points	Rank	Points	Rank
Jin Boyang	Men's singles	86.55	13 Q	142.53	20	229.08	17
Zhang Ruiyang	Women's singles	59.38	20 Q	118.65	19	178.03	19
Sui Wenjing; Han Cong	Pairs	72.66	6 Q	135.98	5	208.64	5
Wang Shiyue; Liu Xinyu	Ice dance	64.76	21	Did not advance			

Team event

Athlete	Event	Short program / Rhythm dance						Free skate / Free dance					
Athlete	Event	Men's	Women's	Pairs	Ice dance	Total		Men's	Women's	Pairs	Ice dance	Total	
Athlete	Event	Points Team points	Points Team points	Points Team points	Points Team points	Points	Rank	Points Team points	Points Team points	Points Team points	Points Team points	Points	Rank
Jin Boyang (M); Zhang Ruiyang (W); Sui Wenjing / Han Cong (P); Wang Shiyue / Liu Xinyu (ID)	Team event	84.15; 4	59.83; 3	65.37; 5	64.92; 2	14	8	Did not advance					

== Freestyle skiing ==
Aerials
Men

Athlete	Event	Qualification				Finals					
Athlete	Event	Jump 1		Jump 2		Final 1				Final 2	
Athlete	Event	Points	Rank	Points	Rank	Jump 1	Jump 2	Best	Rank	Points	Rank
Li Tianma	Men's	75.56	20	127.50	1 Q	119.91	100.50	119.91	5 Q	123.93	3rd place, bronze medalist(s)
Qi Guangpu	Men's	120.80	2 Q	—N/a		121.68	119.91	121.68	3 Q	81.00	6
Sun Jiaxu	Men's	84.51	16	118.55	2 Q	117.26	96.83	117.26	6 Q	123.42	4
Wang Xindi	Men's	118.10	3 Q	—N/a		120.36	101.50	120.36	4 Q	132.60	1st place, gold medalist(s)

Women

Athlete	Event	Qualification				Finals					
Athlete	Event	Jump 1		Jump 2		Final 1				Final 2	
Athlete	Event	Points	Rank	Points	Rank	Jump 1	Jump 2	Best	Rank	Points	Rank
Chen Meiting	Women's	86.71	10	100.29	1 Q	98.73	76.93	98.73	9	Did not advance	
Kong Fanyu	Women's	89.72	4 Q	—N/a		113.33	DNS	113.33	2 Q	101.31	4
Shao Qi	Women's	90.22	3 Q	—N/a		105.93	DNS	105.93	6 Q	101.90	3rd place, bronze medalist(s)
Xu Mengtao	Women's	89.29	5 Q	—N/a		107.75	DNS	107.75	4 Q	112.90	1st place, gold medalist(s)

Mixed

Athlete	Event				
Athlete	Event	Final 1		Final 2	
Athlete	Event	Points	Rank	Points	Rank
Xu Mengtao; Wang Xindi; Li Tianma	Mixed	315.02	2 Q	279.68	3rd place, bronze medalist(s)

Moguls

Athlete	Event	Qualification								Final							
Athlete	Event	Run 1				Run 2				Run 1				Run 2			Rank
Athlete	Event	Time	Points	Total	Rank	Time	Points	Total	Rank	Time	Points	Total	Rank	Time	Points	Total	Rank
Li Ruilin	Women's moguls	30.93	41.82	53.45	26	29.53	39.55	52.83	19	Did not advance							
Yang Ya	Women's moguls	30.52	45.48	57.60	24	30.59	45.69	57.72	18	Did not advance							

Dual moguls

Athlete	Event	1/16 Final	1/8 Final	Quarterfinal	Semifinal	Final	
Athlete	Event	Opposition Result	Opposition Result	Opposition Result	Opposition Result	Opposition Result	Rank
Li Ruilin	Women's dual moguls	Koehler (CAN); L 0–35	Did not advance				28
Yang Ya	Women's dual moguls	Gorodko (KAZ); L 9–26	Did not advance				23

Park & Pipe
Men

Athlete	Event	Qualification				Final				
Athlete	Event	Run 1	Run 2	Best	Rank	Run 1	Run 2	Run 3	Best	Rank
Sheng Haipeng	Halfpipe	50.75	54.75	54.75	20	Did not advance				
Su Shuaibing	Halfpipe	44.50	63.00	63.00	16	Did not advance				
Sun Jingbo	Halfpipe	28.25	57.00	57.00	19	Did not advance				
Yang Kaiyue	Halfpipe	11.00	13.50	13.50	25	Did not advance				

Women

Athlete	Event	Qualification					Final				
Athlete	Event	Run 1	Run 2	Run 3	Best	Rank	Run 1	Run 2	Run 3	Best	Rank
Eileen Gu	Big air	86.00	20.75	84.75	170.75	2 Q	90.00	61.25	89.00	179.00	2nd place, silver medalist(s)
Eileen Gu	Halfpipe	16.25	86.50	—N/a	86.50	5 Q	30.00	94.00	94.75	94.75	1st place, gold medalist(s)
Eileen Gu	Slopestyle	1.26	75.30	—N/a	75.30	2 Q	86.58	23.00	1.65	86.58	2nd place, silver medalist(s)
Han Linshan	Slopestyle	43.93	62.98	—N/a	62.98	5 Q	DNS				
Li Fanghui	Halfpipe	85.00	90.00	—N/a	90.00	2 Q	81.25	91.50	93.00	93.00	2nd place, silver medalist(s)
Liu Mengting	Big air	80.00	80.00	DNI	160.00	9 Q	43.00	90.00	76.00	166.00	7
Liu Mengting	Slopestyle	47.98	55.10	—N/a	55.10	11 Q	67.46	13.66	11.28	67.46	5
Liu Yishan	Halfpipe	76.00	DNI	—N/a	76.00	11 Q	70.00	DNI	71.75	71.75	9
Yang Ruyi	Big air	70.75	66.00	DNI	136.75	16	Did not advance				
Yang Ruyi	Slopestyle	10.38	42.45	—N/a	42.45	19	Did not advance				
Zhang Kexin	Halfpipe	82.75	DNI	—N/a	82.75	6 Q	24.25	26.25	83.25	83.25	6

Ski cross

Athlete	Event	Seeding		1/8 final	Quarterfinal	Semifinal	Final	
Athlete	Event	Time	Rank	Position	Position	Position	Position	Rank
Li Wenwen	Women's ski cross	DNS	32	DNS	Did not advance			32
Zhang Xuelian	Women's ski cross	1:23.16	30	4	Did not advance			30

== Luge ==
Men

Athlete	Event	Run 1		Run 2		Run 3		Run 4		Total	
Athlete	Event	Time	Rank	Time	Rank	Time	Rank	Time	Rank	Time	Rank
Bao Zhenyu	Men's singles	54.648	22	54.896	25	54.683	23	Did not advance		2:44.227	24
Hou Shuo; Jubayi Saikeyi	Men's doubles	54.108	15	53.930	15	—N/a				1:48.038	15

Women

Athlete	Event	Run 1		Run 2		Run 3		Run 4		Total	
Athlete	Event	Time	Rank	Time	Rank	Time	Rank	Time	Rank	Time	Rank
Wang Peixuan	Women's singles	53.897	19	54.460	22	54.274	22	Did not advance		2:42.631	21
Gulijienaiti Adikeyoumu; Zhao Jiaying	Women's doubles	54.180	7	54.307	9	—N/a				1:48.487	8

Mixed

Athlete	Event	Women's singles		Men's doubles		Men's singles		Women's doubles		Total	
Athlete	Event	Time	Rank	Time	Rank	Time	Rank	Time	Rank	Time	Rank
Wang Peixuan; Hou Shuo / Jubayi Saikeyi; Bao Zhenyu; Gulijienaiti Adikeyoumu / Zhao Jiaying	Team relay	56.760	7	56.368	7	56.364	8	57.350	8	3:46.842	7

== Nordic combined ==
Athlete	Event	Ski jumping			Cross-country		Total	
Athlete	Event	Distance	Points	Rank	Time	Rank	Time	Rank
Zhao Jiawen	Individual normal hill/10 km	94.5	110.2	25	35:26.2	31	36:56.2	31
Zhao Jiawen	Individual large hill/10 km	125.0	118.7	23	27:29.4	30	29:34.4	28
Zhao Zihe	Individual normal hill/10 km	88.0	93.4	34	39:49.0	36	42:26.0	36
Zhao Zihe	Individual large hill/10 km	119.5	101.4	32	30:07.4	34	33:21.4	34
Zhao Zihe; Zhao Jiawen	Team large hill/2 × 7.5 km	217.5	175.9	12	49:13.8	14	50:47.8	14

== Short-track speed skating ==
China qualified the maximum team size of ten short-track speed skaters (five per gender) after the conclusion of the 2025–26 ISU Short Track World Tour.

Men

Athlete	Event	Heat		Quarterfinal		Semifinal		Final	
Athlete	Event	Time	Rank	Time	Rank	Time	Rank	Time	Rank
Lin Xiaojun	500 m	41.242	2 Q	40.638	4	Did not advance			
Shaoang Liu	500 m	41.100	1 Q	40.461	2 Q	1:10.008	5 FB	41.525	6
Sun Long	500 m	PEN		Did not advance					
Lin Xiaojun	1000 m	1:26.314	3 ADV	1:25.782	5	Did not advance			
Shaoang Liu	1000 m	1:26.814	1 Q	1:24.292	2 Q	1:26.102	4 FB	1:27.211	6
Sun Long	1000 m	1:25.339	2 Q	1:26.563	1 Q	1:23.585	2 FA	1:24.565	2nd place, silver medalist(s)
Lin Xiaojun	1500 m	—N/a		DNF		Did not advance			
Shaoang Liu	1500 m	—N/a		2:23.370	2 Q	2:31.859	6 ADVA	3:15.414	7
Sun Long	1500 m	—N/a		2:20.897	3 Q	2:15.160	2 FA	DNF	8
Li Wenlong*; Lin Xiaojun; Shaoang Liu; Sun Long; Zhang Bohao	5000 m relay	—N/a				6:55.278	3 FB	6:49.894	5

Qualification legend: Q - Qualify based on position in heat; q - Qualify based on time in field; FA - Qualify to medal final; ADV A - Advanced to medal final on referee decision; FB - Qualify to consolation final
* - Athlete skated in a preliminary round but not the final.

Women

Athlete	Event	Heat		Quarterfinal		Semifinal		Final	
Athlete	Event	Time	Rank	Time	Rank	Time	Rank	Time	Rank
Fan Kexin	500 m	42.992	3 q	42.737	3 q	42.833	3 FB	1:19.245	10
Wang Xinran	500 m	43.246	1 Q	PEN		Did not advance			
Zhang Chutong	500 m	43.100	2 Q	PEN		Did not advance			
Gong Li	1000 m	1:27.788	1 Q	1:28.147	3 q	1:29.737	2 FA	1:29.392	5
Yang Jingru	1000 m	1:28.977	3 q	1:28.838	4	Did not advance			
Zhang Chutong	1000 m	1:28.357	2 Q	PEN		Did not advance			
Gong Li	1500 m	—N/a		PEN		Did not advance			
Yang Jingru	1500 m	—N/a		2:29.524	2 Q	2:33.458	1 FA	2:32.713	4
Zhang Chutong	1500 m	—N/a		2:32.321	3 Q	2:29.578	3 FB	2:37.181	11
Gong Li; Wang Xinran; Yang Jingru; Zhang Chutong	3000 m relay	—N/a				4:04.978	3 FB	4:10.446	5

Qualification legend: Q - Qualify based on position in heat; q - Qualify based on time in field; FA - Qualify to medal final; FB - Qualify to consolation final; ADV - Advanced on referee decision

Mixed

Athlete	Event	Quarterfinal		Semifinal		Final	
Athlete	Event	Time	Rank	Time	Rank	Time	Rank
Gong Li; Lin Xiaojun*; Shaoang Liu; Sun Long; Wang Xinran*; Zhang Chutong	2000 m relay	2:39.193	2 Q	2:38.375	2 FA	2:39.601	4

Qualification legend: Q - Qualify based on position in heat; q - Qualify based on time in field; FA - Qualify to medal final; FB - Qualify to consolation final
* - Athlete skated in a preliminary round but not the final.

== Skeleton ==
Athlete	Event	Run 1		Run 2		Run 3		Run 4		Total	
Athlete	Event	Time	Rank	Time	Rank	Time	Rank	Time	Rank	Time	Rank
Chen Wenhao	Men's	56.43	5	56.25	4	55.96	6	55.95	3	3:44.59	4
Lin Qinwei	Men's	56.89	=12	56.33	5	56.21	9	56.18	6	3:45.61	8
Yin Zheng	Men's	56.56	8	56.66	11	56.08	7	56.25	9	3:45.55	7
Liang Yuxin	Women's	58.38	20	58.77	23	58.79	21	58.59	20	3:54.53	21
Zhao Dan	Women's	57.70	=6	57.47	6	57.83	=7	58.21	=15	3:51.21	8
Liang Yuxin; Lin Qinwei	Mixed team	1:01.27	8	59.39	9	—N/a				2:00.66	8
Zhao Dan; Chen Wenhao	Mixed team	1:00.77	=4	59.16	5	—N/a				1:59.93	5

== Ski jumping ==
Men

Athlete	Event	First round			Final round			Total	
Athlete	Event	Distance	Points	Rank	Distance	Points	Rank	Points	Rank
Song Qiwu	Normal hill	101.0	122.9	29 Q	93.5	114.3	31	237.2	31
Song Qiwu	Large hill	127.5	113.1	39	Did not advance				
Song Qiwu; Zhao Jiawen	Large hill super team	230.5	183.6	16	Did not advance				

Women

Athlete	Event	First round			Final round			Total	
Athlete	Event	Distance	Points	Rank	Distance	Points	Rank	Points	Rank
Dong Bing	Normal hill	87.5	92.7	45	Did not advance				
Dong Bing	Large hill	113.5	97.5	31	Did not advance				
Liu Qi	Normal hill	96.0	115.9	20 Q	93.0	101.5	29	217.4	26
Liu Qi	Large hill	118.5	108.2	22 Q	119.0	102.4	25	210.6	26
Weng Yangning	Normal hill	91.5	102.7	40	Did not advance				
Weng Yangning	Large hill	108.0	75.8	45	Did not advance				
Zeng Ping	Normal hill	99.0	122.6	13 Q	95.0	114.7	16	237.3	15
Zeng Ping	Large hill	117.0	114.5	16 Q	133.0	105.4	24	219.9	21

Mixed

Athlete	Event	First round			Final round			Total	
Athlete	Event	Distance	Points	Rank	Distance	Points	Rank	Points	Rank
Liu Qi; Song Qiwu; Zeng Ping; Zhao Jiawen	Team	378.5	460.5	7 Q	379	463.6	8	924.1	8

== Ski mountaineering ==
China qualified one female and one male ski mountaineer through the 2025 ISMF World Championships.

Athlete	Event	Heat		Semifinal		Final	
Athlete	Event	Time	Rank	Time	Rank	Time	Rank
Bu Luer	Men's sprint	2:43.89	4 LL	2:47.04	4	Did not advance	
Cidan Yuzhen	Women's sprint	3:27.40	4	Did not advance			
Bu Luer; Cidan Yuzhen	Mixed relay	—N/a				29:21.66	8

== Snowboarding ==
Alpine

Athlete	Event	Qualification		Round of 16	Quarterfinal	Semifinal	Final	
Athlete	Event	Time	Rank	Opposition Time	Opposition Time	Opposition Time	Opposition Time	Rank
Ban Xuefu	Men's parallel giant slalom	1:29.33	29	Did not advance				
Bi Ye	Men's parallel giant slalom	1:28.48	27	Did not advance				
Bai Xinhui	Women's parallel giant slalom	1:39.22	28	Did not advance				
Dong Yuyue	Women's parallel giant slalom	1:38.14	25	Did not advance				
Gong Naiying	Women's parallel giant slalom	1:36.86	21	Did not advance				

Cross

Athlete	Event	Seeding		1/8 final	Quarterfinal	Semifinal	Final	
Athlete	Event	Time	Rank	Position	Position	Position	Position	Rank
Pang Chuyuan	Women's	1:16.67	25	4	Did not advance			
Yongqinglamu	Women's	1:17.07	26	4	Did not advance			

Park & Pipe
Men

Athlete	Event	Qualification					Final				
Athlete	Event	Run 1	Run 2	Run 3	Best	Rank	Run 1	Run 2	Run 3	Best	Rank
Ge Chunyu	Big air	59.75	6.00	16.00	75.75	29	Did not advance				
Ge Chunyu	Slopestyle	21.70	19.61	—N/a	21.70	28	Did not advance				
Ren Chongshuo	Halfpipe	39.25	DNI	—N/a	39.25	20	Did not advance				
Su Yiming	Big air	22.00	87.75	85.00	172.75	4 Q	88.25	73.75	80.25	168.50	3rd place, bronze medalist(s)
Su Yiming	Slopestyle	70.83	72.78	—N/a	72.78	8 Q	82.41	79.90	82.18	82.41	1st place, gold medalist(s)
Wang Ziyang	Halfpipe	77.75	80.50	—N/a	80.50	10 Q	17.75	17.25	76.00	76.00	9
Yang Wenlong	Big air	12.50	80.25	75.50	155.75	19	Did not advance				
Yang Wenlong	Slopestyle	16.96	41.73	—N/a	41.73	22	Did not advance				

Women

Athlete	Event	Qualification					Final				
Athlete	Event	Run 1	Run 2	Run 3	Best	Rank	Run 1	Run 2	Run 3	Best	Rank
Cai Xuetong	Halfpipe	77.75	83.00	—N/a	83.00	5 Q	73.00	80.75	DNI	80.75	6
Liu Jiayu	Halfpipe	62.75	DNI	—N/a	62.75	14	Did not advance				
Wu Shaotong	Halfpipe	74.50	75.25	—N/a	75.25	12 Q	67.75	70.25	78.00	78.00	7
Yang Lu	Halfpipe	42.50	DNI	—N/a	42.50	19	Did not advance				
Zhang Xiaonan	Big air	79.75	71.00	74.75	154.50	11 Q	74.25	14.25	70.25	144.50	5
Zhang Xiaonan	Slopestyle	20.06	42.11	—N/a	42.11	24	Did not advance				

DNI — Did not improve.

== Speed skating ==
China qualified fifteen speed skaters (seven men and eight women) through performances at the 2025-26 ISU Speed Skating World Cup.

Men

Athlete	Event	Race	
Athlete	Event	Time	Rank
Gao Tingyu	500 m	34.47	7
Lian Ziwen	500 m	34.76	14
Xue Zhiwen	500 m	34.66	11
Lian Ziwen	1000 m	DSQ	
Ning Zhongyan	1000 m	1:07.34	3rd place, bronze medalist(s)
Liu Hanbin	1500 m	1:48.99	30
Ning Zhongyan	1500 m	1:41.98	1st place, gold medalist(s)
Liu Hanbin	5000 m	6:24.25	17

Women

Athlete	Event	Race	
Athlete	Event	Time	Rank
Tian Ruining	500 m	38.14	16
Wang Jingziqian	500 m	38.57	22
Han Mei	1000 m	1:15.97	13
Tian Ruining	1000 m	1:17.87	29
Yin Qi	1000 m	1:15.87	12
Han Mei	1500 m	1:54.97	9
Li Jiaxuan	1500 m	1:59.36	27
Yin Qi	1500 m	1:57.75	19
Yang Binyu	3000 m	4:07.62	17
Tai Zhien	5000 m	7:15.71	12

Mass start

Athlete	Event	Semifinal			Final		
Athlete	Event	Points	Time	Rank	Points	Time	Rank
Li Wenhao	Men's	2	7:53.54	10	Did not advance		
Wu Yu	Men's	40	7:47.92	2 Q	0	8:12.04	15
Ahenaer Adake	Women's	0	8:45.31	10	Did not advance		
Yang Binyu	Women's	43	8:36.44	2 Q	3	8:36.16	7

Team pursuit

Athlete	Event	Quarterfinal		Semifinal		Final	
Athlete	Event	Time	Rank	Opposition Time	Rank	Opposition Time	Rank
Li Wenhao; Liu Hanbin; Ning Zhongyan**; Wu Yu	Men's	3:41.66	3 Q	United States; L 3:52.22	2 FB	Netherlands; W 3:41.38	3rd place, bronze medalist(s)
Ahenaer Adake; Han Mei; Li Jiaxuan	Women's	3:01.42	7 FD	Did not advance		Kazakhstan; W*	7

* - Kazakhstan withdrew from Women's team pursuit and the Final D didn't take place. ** - Athlete skated in a preliminary round but not the final.

== See also ==
- China at the 2026 Winter Paralympics
