= FIS Nordic World Ski Championships 2025 – Women's individual normal hill =

Women's individual normal hill at the FIS Nordic World Ski Championships 2025
- Venue: Granåsen Ski Centre
- Location: Trondheim, Norway
- Dates: 27 February (qualification); 28 February
- Competitors: 60 from 19 nations
- Winning points: 259.2

Medalists
gold medal	Nika Prevc	Slovenia
silver medal	Selina Freitag	Germany
bronze medal	Anna Odine Strøm	Norway

The Women's individual normal hill competition at the FIS Nordic World Ski Championships 2025 was held on 27 and 28 February 2025.

== Results ==
=== Qualification ===
The qualification was held on 27 February at 20:30.

Rank	Bib	Name	Country	Distance (m)	Points	Notes
1	60	Nika Prevc	Slovenia	99.5	147.6	Q
2	53	Anna Odine Strøm	Norway	101.5	139.7	Q
3	57	Jacqueline Seifriedsberger	Austria	95.0	137.1	Q
4	56	Eirin Maria Kvandal	Norway	95.0	135.6	Q
5	55	Lisa Eder	Austria	92.5	129.3	Q
6	58	Selina Freitag	Germany	92.0	129.1	Q
7	49	Agnes Reisch	Germany	95.0	125.1	Q
8	54	Eva Pinkelnig	Austria	92.0	124.2	Q
9	52	Ema Klinec	Slovenia	93.0	124.0	Q
10	48	Yuki Ito	Japan	93.5	123.2	Q
11	42	Nozomi Maruyama	Japan	94.0	120.9	Q
11	50	Sara Takanashi	Japan	95.5	120.9	Q
13	46	Abigail Strate	Canada	93.5	120.4	Q
14	51	Alexandria Loutitt	Canada	92.0	117.5	Q
15	38	Heidi Dyhre Tråserud	Norway	99.0	116.8	Q
16	43	Ingvild Synnøve Midtskogen	Norway	94.5	116.0	Q
17	47	Lara Malsiner	Italy	91.0	115.1	Q
18	40	Julia Mühlbacher	Austria	92.0	112.1	Q
19	44	Juliane Seyfarth	Germany	90.5	110.9	Q
20	32	Anna Twardosz	Poland	94.5	110.8	Q
21	34	Liu Qi	China	99.0	110.0	Q
22	39	Joséphine Pagnier	France	89.0	109.7	Q
23	31	Paige Jones	United States	91.5	107.4	Q
24	36	Annika Belshaw	United States	90.0	106.6	Q
25	59	Katharina Schmid	Germany	80.0	106.4	Q
26	35	Nicole Maurer	Canada	93.5	105.0	Q
27	45	Yūka Setō	Japan	87.0	104.5	Q
28	29	Tina Erzar	Slovenia	88.0	103.9	Q
29	37	Annika Sieff	Italy	91.0	103.2	Q
30	33	Julia Kykkänen	Finland	91.0	102.4	Q
31	28	Emma Chervet	France	89.0	101.5	Q
32	24	Weng Yangning	China	92.0	100.1	Q
33	25	Katra Komar	Slovenia	90.0	100.0	Q
34	41	Jenny Rautionaho	Finland	85.5	99.2	Q
35	21	Karolína Indráčková	Czech Republic	89.0	99.1	Q
36	30	Luisa Görlich	Germany	93.0	98.5	Q
37	12	Frida Westman	Sweden	88.0	95.2	Q
38	27	Martina Ambrosi	Italy	86.5	94.2	Q
38	1	Veronika Jenčová	Czech Republic	86.0	94.2	Q
40	23	Anežka Indráčková	Czech Republic	86.5	93.7	Q
41	7	Jessica Malsiner	Italy	84.5	92.7	
42	9	Klára Ulrichová	Czech Republic	86.5	91.2	
43	20	Daniela Haralambie	Romania	86.0	90.8	
44	26	Dong Bing	China	85.5	86.4	
45	8	Kira Mária Kapustíková	Slovakia	85.5	84.9	
46	11	Zhanna Hlukhova	Ukraine	82.5	83.3	
47	22	Josie Johnson	United States	81.5	82.5	
48	16	Sina Arnet	Switzerland	81.5	81.5	
49	3	Nicole Konderla	Poland	79.5	79.5	
50	19	Zhou Shiyu	China	79.0	76.5	
51	15	Tamara Mesiková	Slovakia	77.0	76.1	
52	17	Rea Kindlimann	Switzerland	79.5	74.6	
53	5	Jenny Forsberg	Sweden	80.0	73.6	
54	4	Alyona Sviridenko	Kazakhstan	76.5	67.9	
55	10	Sandra Sproch	United States	75.5	65.2	
56	18	Pola Bełtowska	Poland	71.5	62.6	
57	13	Tetiana Pylypchuk	Ukraine	71.5	55.2	
58	6	Veronika Shishkina	Kazakhstan	68.0	51.2	
59	14	Anastassiya Gorunova	Kazakhstan	62.5	34.3	
60	2	Viktoriya Ruleva	Kazakhstan	60.0	33.6	

=== Final ===
The first round was started on 28 February at 14:00 and the second round at 15:00.

Rank	Bib	Name	Country	Round 1			Final round			Total
Rank	Bib	Name	Country	Distance (m)	Points	Rank	Distance (m)	Points	Rank	Points
1st place, gold medalist(s)	40	Nika Prevc	Slovenia	98.0	129.8	1	100.0	129.4	1	259.2
2nd place, silver medalist(s)	38	Selina Freitag	Germany	99.0	127.5	3	103.5	123.3	2	250.8
3rd place, bronze medalist(s)	33	Anna Odine Strøm	Norway	99.0	129.4	2	96.5	117.2	3	246.6
4	36	Eirin Maria Kvandal	Norway	98.5	126.4	6	101.5	116.5	4	242.9
5	31	Alexandria Loutitt	Canada	101.0	127.5	3	95.5	109.2	7	236.7
5	26	Abigail Strate	Canada	104.5	126.6	5	94.5	110.1	6	236.7
7	34	Eva Pinkelnig	Austria	100.0	126.2	7	94.5	101.7	11	227.9
8	37	Jacqueline Seifriedsberger	Austria	91.0	114.2	9	93.5	103.2	10	217.4
9	28	Yuki Ito	Japan	97.0	117.6	8	90.0	96.6	15	214.2
10	29	Agnes Reisch	Germany	92.0	106.2	13	99.0	107.4	8	213.6
11	35	Lisa Eder	Austria	87.0	100.4	21	99.0	110.6	5	211.0
12	19	Joséphine Pagnier	France	93.0	105.1	16	97.5	105.3	9	210.4
13	32	Ema Klinec	Slovenia	92.5	110.2	10	91.0	98.0	14	208.2
14	30	Sara Takanashi	Japan	90.5	104.4	17	97.5	100.8	12	205.2
15	27	Lara Malsiner	Italy	94.5	109.3	11	90.0	91.5	18	200.8
16	18	Heidi Dyhre Tråserud	Norway	94.5	106.5	12	89.0	93.4	17	199.9
17	22	Nozomi Maruyama	Japan	92.5	100.6	20	92.5	95.0	16	195.6
18	16	Annika Belshaw	United States	94.0	103.0	19	92.0	90.3	20	193.3
19	39	Katharina Schmid	Germany	90.0	105.8	14	86.5	85.0	24	190.8
20	20	Julia Mühlbacher	Austria	92.0	103.4	18	87.0	86.4	22	189.8
21	15	Nicole Maurer	Canada	89.0	89.1	29	95.0	98.6	13	187.7
22	17	Annika Sieff	Italy	89.0	94.1	23	91.5	89.1	21	183.2
22	14	Liu Qi	China	93.5	92.6	25	91.5	90.6	19	183.2
24	25	Yūka Setō	Japan	96.0	105.6	15	80.5	72.7	29	178.3
25	8	Emma Chervet	France	93.0	95.6	22	85.5	81.4	26	177.0
26	11	Paige Jones	United States	89.5	90.6	28	91.0	86.3	23	176.9
27	24	Juliane Seyfarth	Germany	90.0	93.7	24	85.5	81.6	25	175.3
28	1	Veronika Jenčová	Czech Republic	88.5	91.3	27	89.0	80.9	27	172.2
29	12	Anna Twardosz	Poland	88.5	91.7	26	85.5	76.7	28	168.4
30	6	Katra Komar	Slovenia	89.5	86.9	30	77.5	63.0	30	149.9
31	9	Tina Erzar	Slovenia	88.0	85.8	31	Did not qualify			
32	21	Jenny Rautionaho	Finland	85.5	83.4	32	Did not qualify			
33	13	Julia Kykkänen	Finland	83.5	80.6	33	Did not qualify			
34	2	Frida Westman	Sweden	85.0	77.2	34	Did not qualify			
35	3	Karolína Indráčková	Czech Republic	80.5	74.1	35	Did not qualify			
36	5	Weng Yangning	China	83.5	70.5	36	Did not qualify			
37	4	Anežka Indráčková	Czech Republic	79.5	67.6	37	Did not qualify			
38	7	Martina Ambrosi	Italy	77.0	64.9	38	Did not qualify			
	23	Ingvild Synnøve Midtskogen	Norway	Disqualified						
	10	Luisa Görlich	Germany	Did not start						
