= FIS Nordic World Ski Championships 2025 – Women's team normal hill =

Women's team normal hill at the FIS Nordic World Ski Championships 2025
- Venue: Granåsen Ski Centre
- Location: Trondheim, Norway
- Dates: 1 March
- Competitors: 48 from 12 nations
- Teams: 12
- Winning points: 904.5

Medalists
| gold medal | Anna Odine Strøm; Ingvild Synnøve Midtskogen; Heidi Dyhre Tråserud; Eirin Maria Kvandal | Norway |
| silver medal | Lisa Eder; Julia Mühlbacher; Jacqueline Seifriedsberger; Eva Pinkelnig | Austria |
| bronze medal | Juliane Seyfarth; Katharina Schmid; Agnes Reisch; Selina Freitag | Germany |

The Women's team normal hill competition at the FIS Nordic World Ski Championships 2025 was held on 1 March 2025.

== Results ==
The first round was started at 17:02 and the final round at 18:12.

| Rank | Bib | Country | Round 1 | | | Final round | | | Total |
| Rank | Bib | Country | Distance (m) | Points | Rank | Distance (m) | Points | Rank | Points |
|---|---|---|---|---|---|---|---|---|---|
| 1st place, gold medalist(s) | 11 | Norway; Anna Odine Strøm; Ingvild Synnøve Midtskogen; Heidi Dyhre Tråserud; Eirin Maria Kvandal | 100.5; 88.5; 94.0; 98.5 | 445.3; 126.5; 97.3; 102.0; 119.5 | 1 | 102.0; 94.5; 89.0; 94.5 | 459.2; 130.3; 106.1; 99.8; 123.0 | 1 | 904.5 |
| 2nd place, silver medalist(s) | 10 | Austria; Lisa Eder; Julia Mühlbacher; Jacqueline Seifriedsberger; Eva Pinkelnig | 95.5; 89.0; 97.5; 96.0 | 436.4; 115.0; 98.2; 109.7; 113.5 | 3 | 95.5; 91.5; 96.0; 92.0 | 448.7; 116.0; 100.7; 118.7; 113.3 | 2 | 885.1 |
| 3rd place, bronze medalist(s) | 12 | Germany; Juliane Seyfarth; Katharina Schmid; Agnes Reisch; Selina Freitag | 93.5; 91.5; 99.5; 95.5 | 439.7; 100.5; 105.4; 116.9; 116.9 | 2 | 79.0; 86.0; 90.0; 96.0 | 406.8; 82.8; 93.4; 109.0; 121.6 | 3 | 846.5 |
| 4 | 9 | Slovenia; Ema Klinec; Tina Erzar; Katra Komar; Nika Prevc | 90.5; 87.5; 80.5; 102.5 | 406.7; 104.6; 90.1; 74.9; 137.1 | 4 | 88.5; 87.0; 79.5; 90.0 | 386.2; 97.7; 90.5; 79.8; 118.2 | 4 | 792.9 |
| 5 | 8 | Japan; Nozomi Maruyama; Yūka Setō; Yuki Ito; Sara Takanashi | 80.0; 87.5; 91.5; 95.5 | 387.1; 80.4; 93.9; 106.4; 106.4 | 5 | 84.0; 89.0; 83.0; 83.0 | 369.1; 92.5; 92.5; 92.2; 91.9 | 5 | 756.2 |
| 6 | 7 | Italy; Annika Sieff; Jessica Malsiner; Martina Ambrosi; Lara Malsiner | 82.5; 78.0; 78.0; 93.5 | 328.4; 83.0; 69.0; 76.1; 100.3 | 6 | 81.0; 81.0; 78.5; 82.0 | 325.2; 81.3; 73.8; 77.4; 92.7 | 6 | 653.6 |
| 7 | 5 | United States; Paige Jones; Josie Johnson; Sandra Sproch; Annika Belshaw | 83.5; 78.5; 69.5; 87.5 | 298.0; 90.3; 66.2; 46.9; 94.6 | 8 | 87.5; 81.5; 70.0; 82.0 | 315.7; 93.3; 79.5; 49.0; 93.9 | 7 | 613.7 |
| 8 | 3 | China; Weng Yangning; Zhou Shiyu; Dong Bing; Liu Qi | 86.5; 70.5; 83.0; 85.0 | 302.0; 84.3; 47.7; 77.8; 92.2 | 7 | 72.0; 75.0; 78.5; 83.0 | 285.3; 62.0; 60.2; 73.1; 90.0 | 8 | 587.3 |
| 9 | 6 | Finland; Jenny Rautionaho; Minja Korhonen; Heta Hirvonen; Julia Kykkänen | 80.0; 73.5; 75.7; 79.0 | 280.8; 79.7; 56.8; 66.5; 77.8 | 9 | Did not qualify | | | |
| 10 | 1 | Czech Republic; Anežka Indráčková; Klára Ulrichová; Veronika Jenčová; Karolína Indráčková | 70.5; 76.5; 76.0; 77.0 | 70.5; 76.5; 76.0; 77.0 | 10 | Did not qualify | | | |
| 11 | 4 | Poland; Joanna Kil; Pola Bełtowska; Nicole Konderla; Anna Twardosz | 57.5; 77.0; 76.5; 84.5 | 238.9; 26.2; 63.7; 62.3; 86.7 | 11 | Did not qualify | | | |
| 12 | 2 | Kazakhstan; Viktoriya Ruleva; Anastassiya Gorunova; Alyona Sviridenko; Veronika Shishkina | 58.0; 64.0; 64.0; 55.0 | 112.9; 24.9; 26.5; 40.1; 21.4 | 12 | Did not qualify | | | |
