= Nordic combined at the 2026 Winter Olympics – Qualification =

The following is about the qualification rules and the quota allocation for the Nordic combined at the 2026 Winter Olympics.

== Qualification ==
The qualification system for Nordic Combined at the 2026 Winter Olympics in Milano-Cortina has undergone changes compared to the 2022 Beijing Games. There will be a total of 36 quota places available for male athletes, including one reserved for the host nation, Italy. Each National Olympic Committee (NOC) can qualify up to three athletes. The qualification system is based on performances in designated International Ski Federation (FIS) events leading up to the Games. Competitors are eligible to compete if they have scored a World or Grand Prix point in their career, or at least one Continental cup event during the qualification period of July 2024 to 18 January 2026. From this same time period NOCs qualify up to two quotas from the combined rankings of the two world cup seasons. Following that, the Continental Cup standings will be used to fill the remaining quotas. If the prescribed 36 quotas are not filled at this point then NOCs with the highest ranking 3rd athlete may fill the remaining quotas.

=== Changes ===
The 2022 Winter Olympics had a similar qualification structure, with a total quota of 55 male athletes. However, the 2026 qualification system has reduced the overall number of participants to 36. Other key differences include:

- A decrease in the maximum number of athletes per NOC from 5 in 2022 to 3 in 2026.
- The elimination of the Team event in favor of a Team Sprint format.
- A stronger emphasis on high-ranking performances in FIS events for qualification.
- The host nation quota remains unchanged at one athlete.

== Quota allocation ==
Final allocations, before reallocation, were published 19 January 2026.

=== Summary ===
Nations	Athletes	Team
Austria	3	X
China	2	X
Czech Republic	2	X
Estonia	2	X
Finland	3	X
France	3	X
Germany	3	X
Italy	3	X
Japan	3	X
Kazakhstan	1	
Norway	3	X
Poland	2	X
Slovenia	2	X
Ukraine	2	X
United States	2	X
Total: 15 (Note: The Netherlands refused their only quota, and Switzerland refused both of theirs.) NOCs	36	14

=== Next eligible NOC per event ===
A country can be eligible for more than one quota spot per event in the reallocation process. Only the first five spots are listed. NOCs that have accepted a reallocated quota are bolded.

Men's
**France**
**Finland**
**Italy**
United States
Czech Republic
