= Liu Qi =

Liu Qi may refer to:

- Emperor Jing of Han (188 BC – 141 BC), personal name Liu Qi, 6th emperor of the Western Han Dynasty
- Liu Qi (Liu Biao's son) (died 209), oldest son of Eastern Han Dynasty warlord Liu Biao
- Liu Qi (politician, born 1942), former mayor of Beijing and president of Beijing Organizing Committee during the 2008 Summer Olympics
- Liu Qi (politician, born 1957), politician and current party chief of Jiangxi province
- Liu Qi (ski jumper) (born 1996), Chinese ski jumper
- Liu Qi (cyclist) (born 2000), Chinese cyclist
