= Martina Ambrosi =

Italian ski jumper

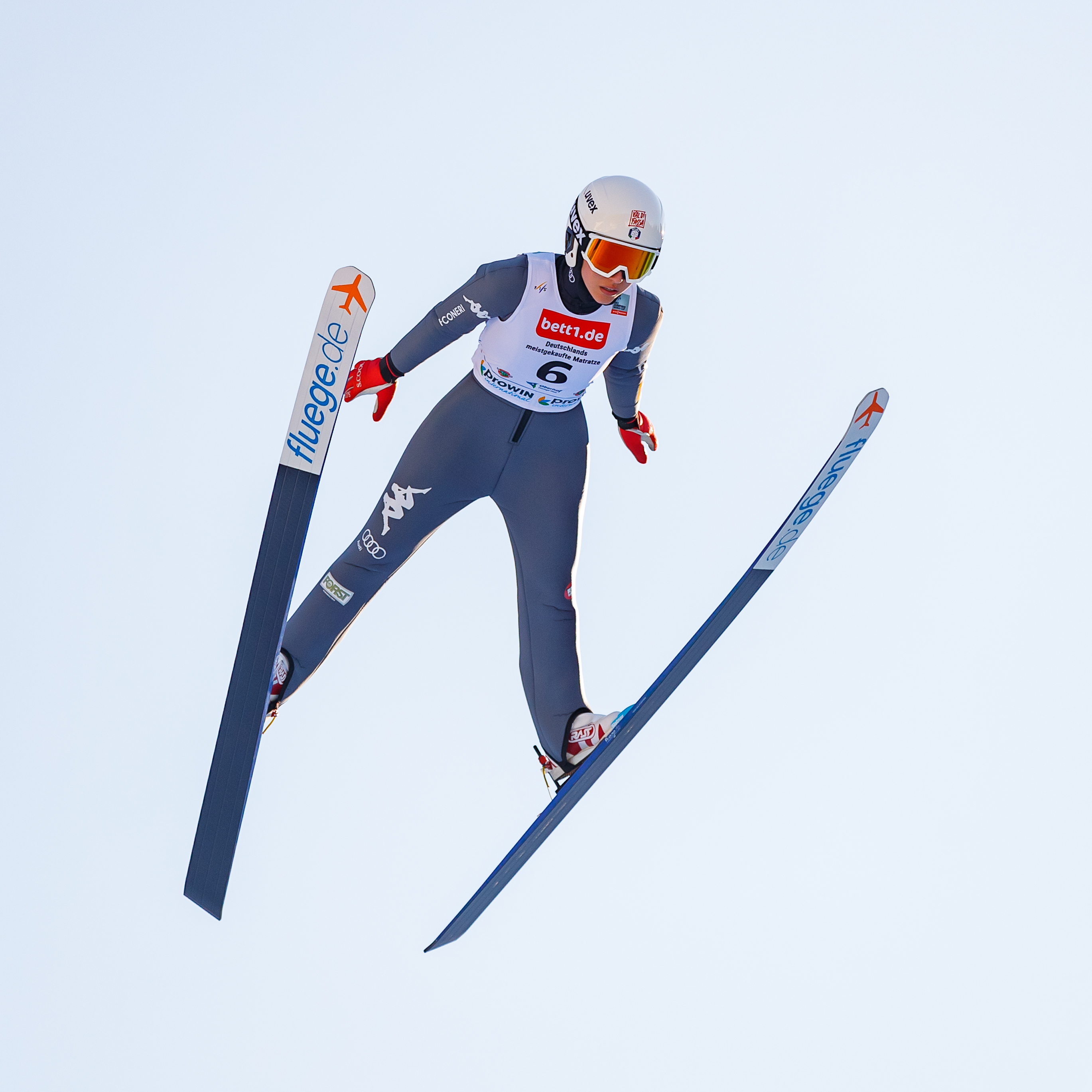
- Ambrosi in 2022

Personal information
- Full name: Martina Ambrosi
- Citizenship: Italy
- Born: 7 April 2001 (age 25) Trento, Italy
- Years active: 2020s–present

Sport
- Country: Italy
- Sport: Ski jumping
- Event: Ski jumping
- Club: Gruppo Sportivo Fiamme Oro

Martina Ambrosi (born 7 April 2001) is an Italian ski jumper. She represented Italy at the 2026 Winter Olympics, held in Milan and Cortina.

== Biography ==
Born in Trento in 2001, Martina is a member of the Gruppo Sportivo Fiamme Oro sports club, which is based in Rome, the Italian capital. She has strong ties to Val di Fassa, especially to Moena, where her maternal grandparents live and where she has spent long periods of time. Martina grew up in the sport, competing for U.S. Dolomitica. After a childhood devoted to skiing, at age 12 she fell in love with ski jumping and, for a time, managed to juggle the trips from the capital to her training locations.

She represented Italy at the FIS Nordic World Ski Championships 2025, held in Trondheim, Norway. She competed in two events at the competition. Competing in the team event, alongside her compatriots Lara Malsiner, Annika Sieff, and Jessica Malsiner, the Italian quartet finished in sixth place. In the individual event, she finished the competition in 38th place.

She was a member of the Italian delegation at the 2026 Winter Olympics, held in Milan and Cortina. In the long track event, she did not advance to the competition round. In the normal hill event, she finished in 46th place.
