= Zeng Ping =

Chinese ski jumper (born 2005)

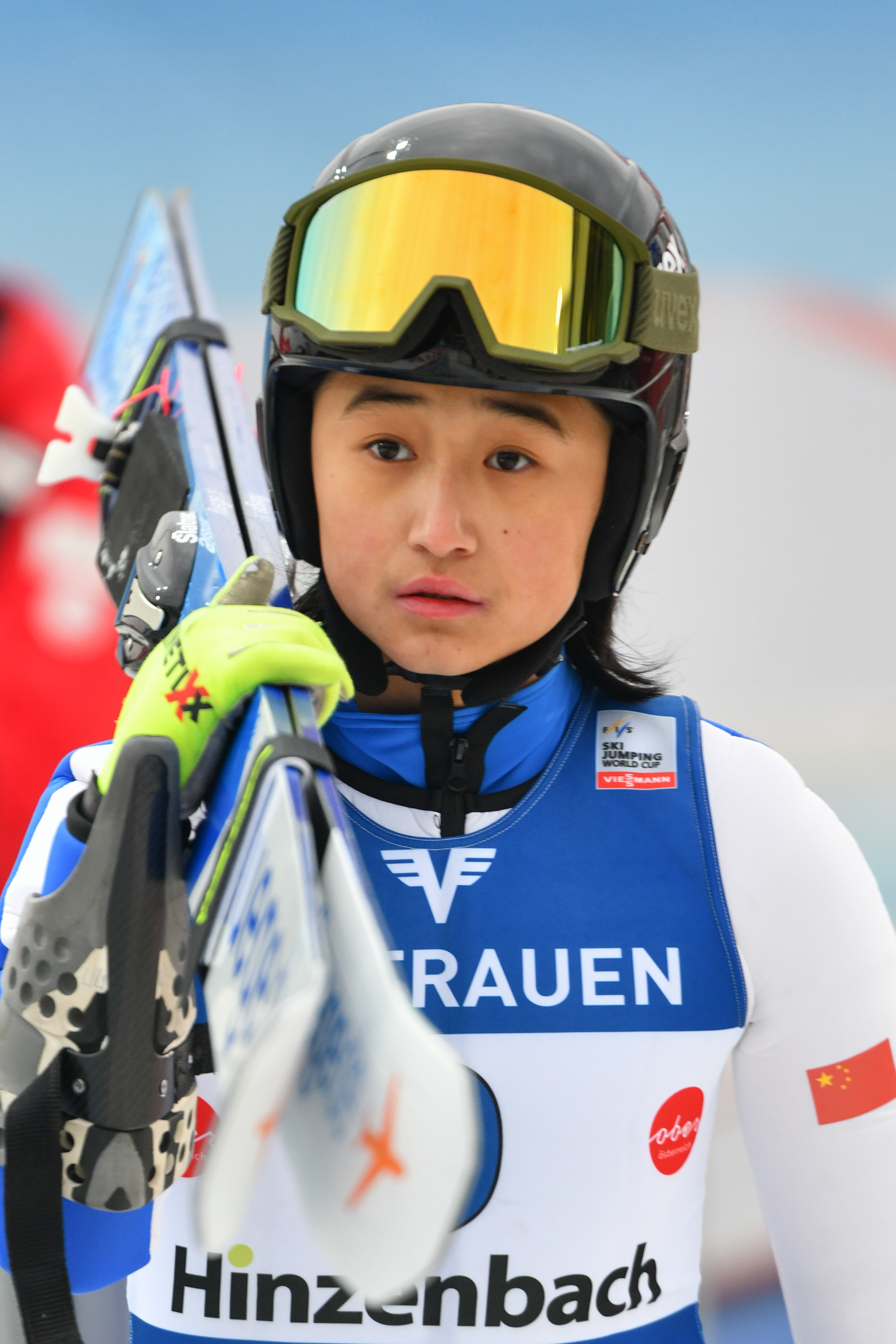
- Zeng in 2023

Personal information
- Born: 1 January 2005 (age 21) Sichuan, China

Sport
- Sport: Ski jumping

World Cup career
- Seasons: 2022–2023, 2026–present
- Indiv. starts: 20
- Indiv. podiums: 1
- Team starts: 1
- Updated on 28 March 2026

Zeng Ping (Chinese: 曾坪; pinyin: Zeng Ping, born 1 January 2005) is a Chinese ski jumper.

At the first day of the year 2026, she became the first ever ski jumper from China (male or female) to stand on the podium at a World Cup event in Oberstdorf, where she achieved 2nd place.

== Career ==
On 3 July 2021, Zeng began her international career at FIS Cup competition in Otepää where she took 6th place and ended the season at 42nd place in overall.

On 25 November 2021, she made her World Cup debut in Nizhny Tagil and stuck in qualifications.

On 7 January 2023 in Sapporo, she made her debut in the main World Cup competition, but didn't earn World Cup points that season. That's why she took a two-year break from the World Cup and competed only in Inter-Continental Cup during that period.

On 1 March 2023, she performed at FIS Nordic World Ski Championships at large hill in Planica on Bloudkova velikanka large hill, where she took 39th place, ahead of Nika Prevc only.

She performed excellently in the 2025/26 Inter-Continental Cup summer season with two wins and 3rd place in overall. This led to her return to the World Cup after she missed seasons at the highest level, where she has continued with great results and historic achievements in China ski jumping from competition to competition, starting with 6th place and then a podium.

== Major tournament results ==
=== Winter Olympics ===
Year	Place	Individual		Team
Year	Place	Normal	Large	Mixed
2026	(Italy) Milano Cortina	15	21	8

=== FIS Nordic World Ski Championships ===
Year	Place	Individual		Team	
Year	Place	Normal	Large	Women	Mixed
2023	(Slovenia) Planica	—	39	—	—

== World Cup ==
=== Standings ===
Season	Position	Points
2021–22	—	0
2022–23	—	0
2025–26	17	434

=== Individual starts ===
Season	1	2	3	4	5	6	7	8	9	10	11	12	13	14	15	16	17	18	19	20	21	22	23	24	25	26	27	28	29	30	31	32	33
2021–22	Nizhny Tagil	Nizhny Tagil	Lillehammer	Lillehammer	Klingenthal	Klingenthal	Ramsau am Dachstein	Ljubno ob Savinji	Ljubno ob Savinji	Willingen	Willingen	Hinzenbach	Hinzenbach	Lillehammer	Lillehammer	Oslo	Oslo	Oberhof	Oberhof
2021–22	q	q	—	—	q	q	q	q	q	—	—	—	—	—	—	—	—	—	—
2022–23	Wisła	Wisła	Lillehammer	Lillehammer	Titisee-Neustadt	Villach	Villach	Ljubno ob Savinji	Ljubno ob Savinji	Sapporo	Sapporo	Zao Onsen	Zao Onsen	Hinterzarten	Hinterzarten	Willingen	Willingen	Hinzenbach	Hinzenbach	Râ?nov	Râ?nov	Oslo	Oslo	Lillehammer	Lillehammer	Lahti
2022–23	—	—	—	—	—	—	—	—	—	36	31	q	32	—	—	—	—	q	q	39	32	—	—	—	—	—
2025–26	Lillehammer	Lillehammer	Falun	Falun	Wisła	Wisła	Klingenthal	Klingenthal	Engelberg	Engelberg	Garmisch-Partenkirchen	Oberstdorf	Villach	Villach	Ljubno ob Savinji	Ljubno ob Savinji	Zhangjiakou	Zhangjiakou	Zao Onsen	Zao Onsen	Sapporo	Sapporo	Willingen	Willingen	Hinzenbach	Hinzenbach	Lahti	Lahti	Oslo	Oslo	Vikersund	Vikersund	Planica
2025–26	DQ	20	51	q	18	13	—	—	14	16	6	2	6	9	7	4	4	8	—	—	—	—	—	—	—	—	—	—	—	—	—	—	—
