= Slovenia at the 2026 Winter Olympics =

- Flag of Slovenia
- IOC code: SLO
- NOC: Olympic Committee of Slovenia
- Website: www.olympic.si

in Milan and Cortina d'Ampezzo, Italy 6 February 2026 – 22 February 2026
- Competitors: 37 (19 men and 18 women) in 6 sports
- Flag bearers (opening): Domen Prevc and Nika Prevc
- Flag bearer (closing): Lila Lapanja
- Medals Ranked 17th: Gold 2 Silver 1 Bronze 1 Total 4

Winter Olympics appearances (overview)
- 1992; 1994; 1998; 2002; 2006; 2010; 2014; 2018; 2022; 2026

Other related appearances
- Yugoslavia (1924–1988)

Slovenia competed at the 2026 Winter Olympics in Milan and Cortina d'Ampezzo, Italy, from 6 to 22 February 2026.

Ski jumpers Domen Prevc and Nika Prevc were the country's flagbearers during the opening ceremony, while alpine skier Lila Lapanja was the flagbearer during the closing ceremony.

== Competitors ==
Slovenia was represented by 37 athletes (19 men and 18 women) in six sports.

Sport	Men	Women	Total
Alpine skiing	3	5	8
Biathlon	5	4	9
Cross-country skiing	3	4	7
Nordic combined	2	—N/a	2
Ski jumping	3	4	7
Snowboarding	3	1	4
Total	19	18	37

== Medalists ==
The following Slovenian competitors won medals at the games. In the discipline sections below, the medalists' names are bolded.

Medal	Name	Sport	Event	Date
Gold	Nika Vodan; Anže Lanišek; Nika Prevc; Domen Prevc	Ski jumping	Mixed normal hill team	10 February
Gold	Domen Prevc	Ski jumping	Men's large hill	14 February
Silver	Nika Prevc	Ski jumping	Women's normal hill individual	7 February
Bronze	Nika Prevc	Ski jumping	Women's large hill individual	15 February

Medals by date
**Day**	**Date**	1st place, gold medalist(s)	2nd place, silver medalist(s)	3rd place, bronze medalist(s)	**Total**
1	7 February	0	1	0	**1**
4	10 February	1	0	0	**1**
8	14 February	1	0	0	**1**
9	15 February	0	0	1	**1**
Total		2	1	1	4

Medals by sport
Sport	1st place, gold medalist(s)	2nd place, silver medalist(s)	3rd place, bronze medalist(s)	Total
Ski jumping	2	1	1	**4**
Total	2	1	1	4

Medals by gender
Gender	1st place, gold medalist(s)	2nd place, silver medalist(s)	3rd place, bronze medalist(s)	Total
Male	1	0	0	**1**
Female	0	1	1	**2**
Mixed	1	0	0	**1**
Total	2	1	1	4

Multiple medalists
**Name**	**Sport**	1st place, gold medalist(s)	2nd place, silver medalist(s)	3rd place, bronze medalist(s)	**Total**
Domen Prevc	Ski jumping	2	0	0	**2**
Nika Prevc	Ski jumping	1	1	1	**3**

== Alpine skiing ==
Slovenia qualified five female and three male alpine skier through the basic quota.

Men Single

Athlete	Event	Run 1		Run 2		Total	
Athlete	Event	Time	Rank	Time	Rank	Time	Rank
Martin Čater	Downhill	—N/a				1:53.51	16
Miha Hrobat	Downhill	—N/a				1:53.30	13
Martin Čater	Super-G	—N/a				1:26.99	20
Miha Hrobat	Super-G	—N/a				1:26.53	13
Žan Kranjec	Giant slalom	1:16.03	9	1:11.41	22	2:27.44	12

Women Single

Athlete	Event	Run 1		Run 2		Total	
Athlete	Event	Time	Rank	Time	Rank	Time	Rank
Ilka Štuhec	Downhill	—N/a				1:38.08	15
Ilka Štuhec	Super-G	—N/a				DNF	
Ana Bucik Jogan	Giant slalom	1:05.35	25	DNF			
Caterina Sinigoi	Giant slalom	1:07.10	38	1:13.36	31	2:20.46	31
Nika Tomšič	Giant slalom	1:07.54	40	1:14.35	35	2:21.89	36
Ana Bucik Jogan	Slalom	49.89	27	53.83	25	1:43.72	24
Lila Lapajna	Slalom	51.91	44	55.87	36	1:47.78	36
Caterina Sinigoi	Slalom	50.87	38	54.54	28	1:45.41	30
Nika Tomšič	Slalom	50.33	34	54.64	29	1:44.97	28

Women Team

Athlete	Event	Downhill		Slalom		Total	
Athlete	Event	Time	Rank	Time	Rank	Time	Rank
Ilka Štuhec; Ana Bucik Jogan	Team combined	1:38.29	15	DNF			

== Biathlon ==
Slovenia qualified four female and five male biathletes through the 2024–25 Biathlon World Cup score.

Men

Athlete	Event	Time	Misses	Rank
Miha Dovžan	Individual	56:28.0	1 (0+0+0+1)	20
Miha Dovžan	Pursuit	36:29.0	6 (1+1+2+2)	46
Miha Dovžan	Sprint	25:10.4	1 (0+1)	36
Jakov Fak	Individual	56:55.5	2 (1+0+1+0)	29
Jakov Fak	Pursuit	33:47.5	1 (0+1+0+0)	14
Jakov Fak	Sprint	24:45.2	1 (0+1)	25
Jakov Fak	Mass start	42:23.2	1 (0+0+1+0)	16
Lovro Planko	Individual	58:16.9	4 (0+1+1+2)	48
Lovro Planko	Pursuit	34:52.2	4 (0+0+2+2)	31
Lovro Planko	Sprint	25:06.0	3 (2+1)	34
Anton Vidmar	Individual	1:01:06.9	7 (2+2+0+3)	71
Anton Vidmar	Pursuit	34:20.9	2 (1+1+0+0)	23
Anton Vidmar	Sprint	25:10.0	2 (0+2)	35
Miha Dovžan; Jakov Fak; Lovro Planko; Anton Vidmar	Men's relay	1:22:53.0	12 (1+11)	9

Women

Athlete	Event	Time	Misses	Rank
Manca Caserman	Individual	51:04.9	6 (2+0+1+3)	85
Manca Caserman	Sprint	23:41.8	1 (0+1)	65
Polona Klemenčič	Individual	45:09.9	4 (1+0+1+2)	38
Polona Klemenčič	Pursuit	33:08.7	5 (1+1+1+2)	28
Polona Klemenčič	Sprint	22:17.5	2 (0+2)	25
Anamarija Lampič	Individual	49:21.6	8 (4+2+1+1)	76
Anamarija Lampič	Sprint	24:25.7	6 (3+3)	78
Lena Repinc	Individual	48:09.3	6 (3+2+1+0)	70
Lena Repinc	Pursuit	33:23.6	4 (2+1+0+1)	32
Lena Repinc	Sprint	22:13.6	0 (0+0)	21
Manca Caserman; Polona Klemenčič; Anamarija Lampič; Lena Repinc	Women's relay	1:15:22.1	17 (1+16)	16

Mixed relay

Athlete	Event	Time	Misses	Rank
Lovro Planko; Anton Vidmar; Polona Klemenčič; Lena Repinc	Relay	1:07:40.9	2+11	13

== Cross-country skiing ==
Slovenia qualified one female and one male cross-country skiers through the basic quota. Following the completion of the 2024–25 FIS Cross-Country World Cup, Slovenia qualified further three female and two male athletes.

Distance
Men

Athlete	Event	Final		
Athlete	Event	Time	Deficit	Rank
Vili Črv	10 km freestyle	23:04.4	+2:28.2	50
Vili Črv	50 km classical	2:21:55.5	+15:10.7	30
Miha Šimenc	10 km freestyle	23:04.6	+2:28.4	51
Miha Šimenc	50 km classical	2:24:25.3	+17:40.5	37
Nejc Štern	10 km freestyle	23:38.4	+3:02.2	62

Women

Athlete	Event	Classical		Freestyle		Final		
Athlete	Event	Time	Rank	Time	Rank	Time	Deficit	Rank
Anja Mandeljc	10 km freestyle	—N/a				26:05.0	+3:15.8	48
Lucija Medja	10 km freestyle	—N/a				30:14.6	+7:25.4	95
Tia Janežič	10 km freestyle	—N/a				29:12.3	+6:23.1	89
Neža Žerjav	10 km freestyle	—N/a				27:13.7	+4:24.5	70
Neža Žerjav	20 km skiathlon	32:53.4	55	LAP				56
Anja Mandeljc	50 km classical	—N/a				LAP		34
Tia Janežič; Anja Mandeljc; Lucija Medja; Neža Žerjav	4×7.5 km relay	—N/a				LAP		18

Sprint
Men

Athlete	Event	Qualification		Quarterfinal		Semifinal		Final	
Athlete	Event	Time	Rank	Time	Rank	Time	Rank	Time	Rank
Miha Šimenc	Sprint	3:18.87	31	Did not advance					
Vili Črv	Sprint	3:23.44	43	Did not advance					
Nejc Štern	Sprint	3:26.12	50	Did not advance					
Miha Šimenc; Nejc Štern	Team sprint	6:01.37	16	—N/a				Did not advance	

Women

Athlete	Event	Qualification		Quarterfinal		Semifinal		Final	
Athlete	Event	Time	Rank	Time	Rank	Time	Rank	Time	Rank
Tia Janežič	Sprint	4:11.19	65	Did not advance					
Lucija Medja	Sprint	4:06.67	57	Did not advance					
Lucija Medja; Anja Mandeljc	Team sprint	7:14.31	16	—N/a				Did not advance	

== Nordic Combined ==
Slovenia sent two male athletes to the Olympics.

Men Single

Athlete	Event	Ski jumping			Cross-country		Total	
Athlete	Event	Distance	Points	Rank	Time	Rank	Time	Rank
Gašper Brecl	Normal hill/10 km	93.5	113.9	20	33:14.4	25	34:29.4	24
Gašper Brecl	Large hill/10 km	121.0	115.2	25	26:21.3	22	28:40.3	26
Vid Vrhovnik	Normal hill/10 km	91.5	106.9	26	33:48.5	28	35:31.5	28
Vid Vrhovnik	Large hill/10 km	126.5	121.9	20	26:19.5	21	28:11.5	22

Men Team

Athlete	Event	Ski jumping			Cross-country		Total	
Athlete	Event	Distance	Points	Rank	Time	Rank	Time	Rank
Gašper Brecl; Vid Vrhovnik	Team large hill/2 × 7.5 km	230.0	197.8	9	44:03.7	9	45:08.7	10

== Ski jumping ==
Slovenia sent 4 women and 3 men to the Olympics.

Men Single

Athlete	Event	First round			Final round			Total	
Athlete	Event	Distance	Points	Rank	Distance	Points	Rank	Points	Rank
Anže Lanišek	Normal hill	97.5	123.7	28 Q	97.5	125.9	20	249.6	26
Anže Lanišek	Large hill	124.5	53.7	28 Q	118.5	42.9	30	214.3	30
Domen Prevc	Normal hill	100.0	130.6	8 Q	105.0	131.2	7	261.8	6
Domen Prevc	Large hill	138.5	78.9	2 Q	141.5	84.3	1	301.8	1st place, gold medalist(s)
Timi Zajc	Normal hill	99.0	126.5	16 Q	100.5	125.4	24	251.9	21
Timi Zajc	Large hill	123.0	116.9	34	Did not advance				

Men Team

Athlete	Event	First round			Second round			Final			Total	
Athlete	Event	Distance	Points	Rank	Distance	Points	Rank	Distance	Points	Rank	Points	Rank
Anže Lanišek; Domen Prevc	Large hill super team	265.5	280.9	2 Q	258.00	255.2	7 Q	Cancelled			536.1	5

Women Single

Athlete	Event	First round			Final			Total	
Athlete	Event	Distance	Points	Rank	Distance	Points	Rank	Points	Rank
Katra Komar	Large hill	114.0	90.2	39	Did not advance				
Maja Kovačič	Large hill	122.0	109.6	20	124.0	116.7	17	226.3	19
Nika Prevc	Large hill	128.0	128.3	5	127.5	143.2	2	271.5	3rd place, bronze medalist(s)
Nika Vodan	Large hill	112.0	117.9	12	129.5	137.0	6	254.9	9
Katra Komar	Normal hill	91.0	106.6	34	Did not advance				
Maja Kovačič	Normal hill	92.0	106.9	32	Did not advance				
Nika Prevc	Normal hill	98.0	135.9	2	99.5	130.3	2	266.2	2nd place, silver medalist(s)
Nika Vodan	Normal hill	95.0	126.3	7	94.5	116.2	14	242.5	8

Mixed Team

Athlete	Event	First round			Final			Total	
Athlete	Event	Distance	Points	Rank	Distance	Points	Rank	Points	Rank
Anže Lanišek; Domen Prevc; Nika Prevc; Nika Vodan	Normal hill	399.5	526.9	1	400.0	542.3	1	1069.2	1st place, gold medalist(s)

== Snowboarding ==
Slovenia sent three male and one female snowboarders to the Olympics.

Men Parallel

Athlete	Event	Qualification		Round of 16	Quarterfinal	Semifinal	Final	
Athlete	Event	Time	Rank	Opposition Time	Opposition Time	Opposition Time	Opposition Time	Rank
Žan Košir	Men's giant slalom	1:27.33	9 Q	Kim (KOR); L DNF	Did not advance			
Rok Marguč	Men's giant slalom	1:27.56	16 Q	Fischnaller (ITA); L +0.59	Did not advance			
Tim Mastnak	Men's giant slalom	1:27.48	15 Q	March (ITA); W	Felicetti (ITA); W	Karl (AUT); L +0.24	Zamfirov (BUL); L +0.00 (photo)	4

Women Parallel

Athlete	Event	Qualification		Round of 16	Quarterfinal	Semifinal	Final	
Athlete	Event	Time	Rank	Opposition Time	Opposition Time	Opposition Time	Opposition Time	Rank
Gloria Kotnik	Women's giant slalom	1:35.43	17	Did not advance				
