= Zhang Jin (bobsledder) =

Chinese bobsledder (born 2003)

Personal information
- Nationality: Chinese
- Born: 10 December 2003 (age 22)

Sport
- Country: China
- Sport: Bobsleigh
- Events: Two-man, Four-man

Zhang Jin (Chinese: 张锦; born 10 December 2003) is a Chinese bobsledder. He represented China at the 2026 Winter Olympics. He was a push athlete for the team of Sun Kaizhi in four-man - the team finished 16th in the event.
