= Chen Wenhao =

Chinese skeleton racer (born 1996)

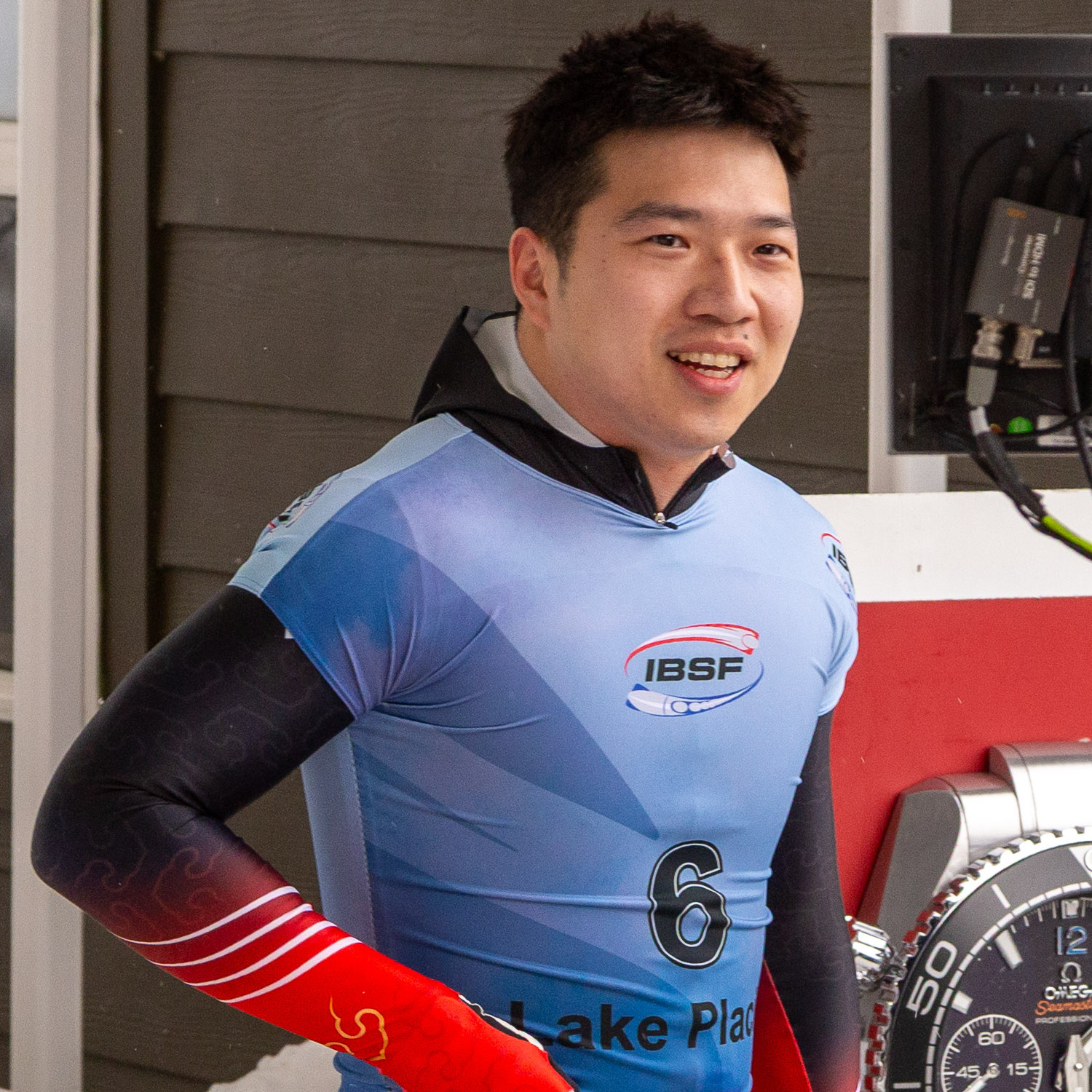
- Chen in 2025

Personal information
- Born: 29 November 1996 (age 29)

Sport
- Country: China
- Sport: Skeleton

Chen Wenhao (Chinese: 陈文浩; born 29 November 1996) is a Chinese skeleton racer. He represented China at the 2026 Winter Olympics.

== Career ==
During the 2022–23 Skeleton World Cup, Chen earned his first career World Cup podium on 10 February 2023, finishing in third place.

In January 2026, he was selected to represent China at the 2026 Winter Olympics. During the skeleton competition, he finished in fourth place.
