= Nika Prevc =

Slovenian ski jumper (born 2005)

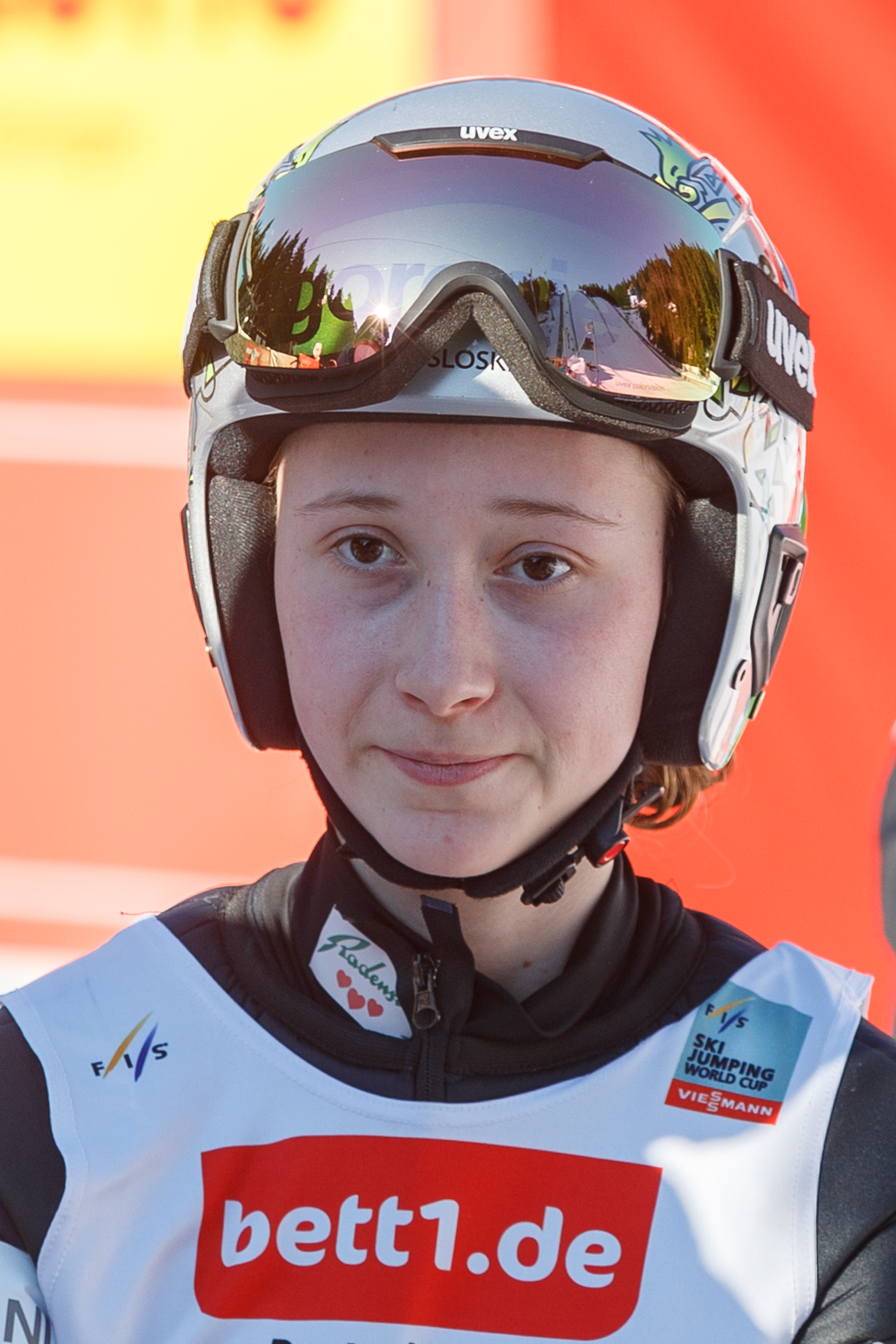
- Prevc in 2022

Personal information
- Born: 15 March 2005 (age 21) Kranj, Slovenia

Sport
- Sport: Ski jumping
- Club: SK Triglav Kranj

World Cup career
- Seasons: 2022–present
- Indiv. starts: 115
- Indiv. podiums: 60
- Indiv. wins: 40
- Team starts: 8
- Team podiums: 3
- Team wins: 2
- Overall titles: 3 (2024, 2025, 2026)
- Raw Air titles: 1 (2025)

Achievements and titles
- Personal bests: 242.5 m (796 ft); Planica, 27 March 2026
Medal record
Women's ski jumping
Representing Slovenia
Olympic Games
Gold medal – first place	2026 Milano Cortina	Mixed team NH
Silver medal – second place	2026 Milano Cortina	Individual NH
Bronze medal – third place	2026 Milano Cortina	Individual LH
World Championships
Gold medal – first place	2025 Trondheim	Individual NH
Gold medal – first place	2025 Trondheim	Individual LH
Silver medal – second place	2025 Trondheim	Mixed team LH
European Games
Silver medal – second place	2023 Kraków-Małopolska	Individual NH
Silver medal – second place	2023 Kraków-Małopolska	Individual LH
Bronze medal – third place	2023 Kraków-Małopolska	Mixed team NH
World Junior Championships
Gold medal – first place	2022 Zakopane	Individual NH
Gold medal – first place	2022 Zakopane	Team NH
Gold medal – first place	2023 Whistler	Mixed team NH
Silver medal – second place	2022 Zakopane	Mixed team NH
Silver medal – second place	2023 Whistler	Individual NH
Silver medal – second place	2023 Whistler	Team NH
Bronze medal – third place	2021 Lahti	Team NH
European Youth Winter Olympic Festival
Gold medal – first place	2022 Vuokatti	Individual
Gold medal – first place	2022 Vuokatti	Mixed team
Gold medal – first place	2023 Friuli-Venezia Giulia	Individual
Gold medal – first place	2023 Friuli-Venezia Giulia	Team
Gold medal – first place	2023 Friuli-Venezia Giulia	Mixed team
- Updated on 22 November 2026

Nika Prevc (born 15 March 2005) is a Slovenian ski jumper. She is one of the most successful women's ski jumpers of all time with three overall FIS Ski Jumping World Cup titles, two individual gold medals at the FIS Nordic World Ski Championships, and three medals (one gold) at the Winter Olympics. Prevc has also won 40 individual World Cup events, the second-most behind only Sara Takanashi. In addition, she holds the record for most points won in a women's World Cup season (2,676), the record for most wins in a single World Cup season (18), and the joint record for most consecutive wins in a single World Cup season (10).

Prevc is the current women's world record holder with 242.5 metres (796 ft), set in Planica on 27 March 2026.

== Career ==
=== Early career ===
Prevc made her official ski jumping debut on 5 August 2018, at the age of 13, at the FIS Ski Jumping Alpen Cup competition in Klingenthal. She finished in 29th place out of 55 competitors. Almost exactly a year later, on 4 August 2019, she achieved her first Alpen Cup victory at the same venue.

In the 2020–21 Alpen Cup season, Prevc became the overall winner of the competition with 597 points out of 8 events; she also finished outside the top three only twice. In the same season, she also made her debut in the FIS Ski Jumping Continental Cup, where she finished seventh overall.

=== World Cup debut, first podium and youth world champion (2021–2023) ===
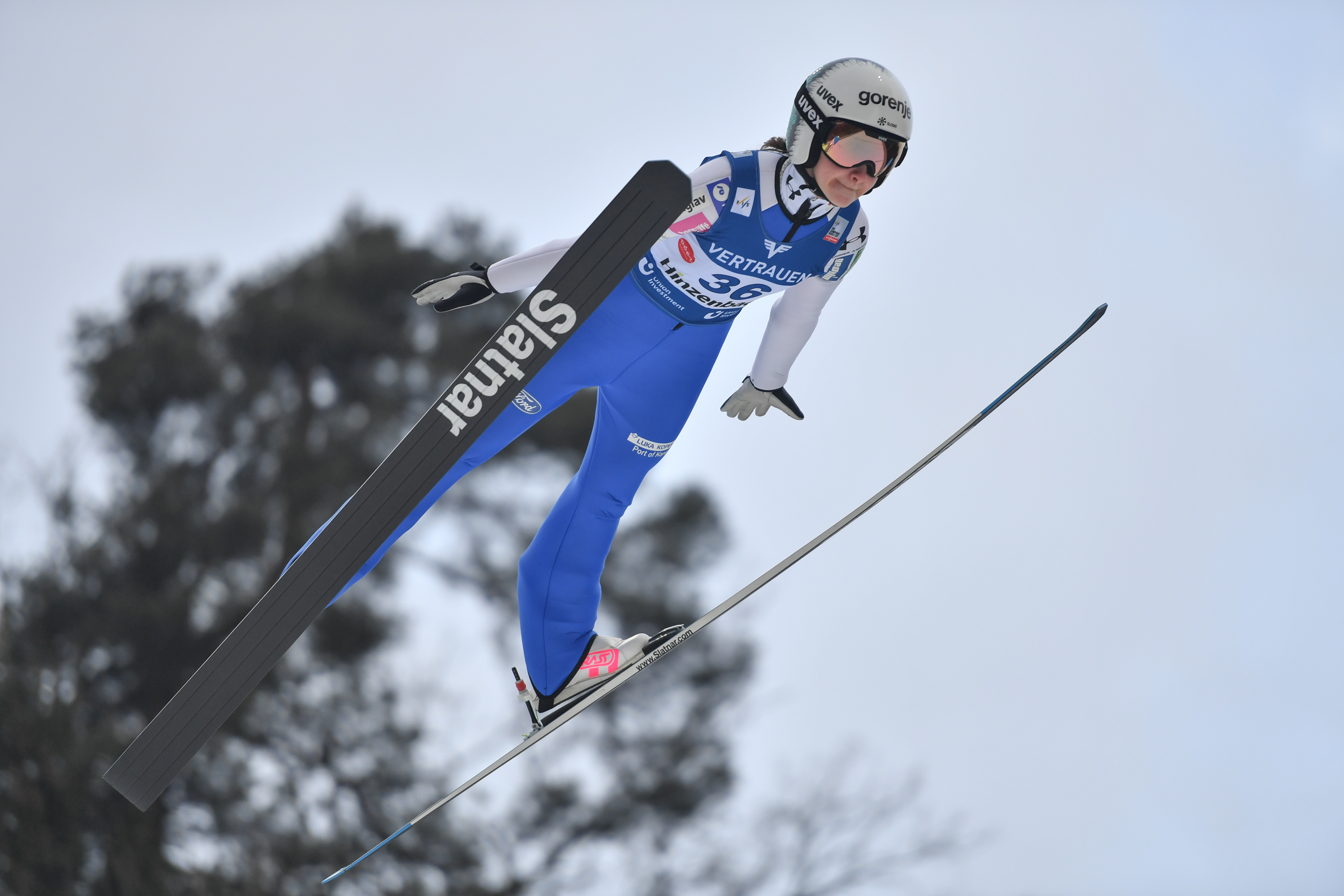
Prevc competing in Hinzenbach in February 2023, where she won her first World Cup podium.

Prevc made her debut in the top-tier FIS Ski Jumping World Cup in November 2021, aged 16, in Nizhny Tagil. She finished her inaugural match in 23rd place, which was enough for her first World Cup points.

Prevc won several gold medals at junior level in 2022. She won the individual gold at the 2022 European Youth Olympic Winter Festival, in addition to gold in the mixed team event. Prevc also became the junior world champion at the 2022 Nordic Junior World Ski Championships in Zakopane, where she also won gold in the women's team event and a silver medal in the mixed team event with the Slovenia national team.

In February 2023, she finished on the World Cup podium for the first time after finishing third in Hinzenbach.

=== World Cup overall titles, records and Olympic debut (2023–present) ===
The 2023–24 season marked a breakthrough in her career. On 16 December 2023 in Engelberg, Prevc achieved her first individual World Cup victory after finishing above her countrywoman Ema Klinec. She then clinched the overall ranking of the inaugural 'Two Nights Tour' with a victory in Garmisch-Partenkirchen and a fifth-place finish in Oberstdorf, and took the lead in the overall World Cup standings after a victory in Villach in January 2024. Prevc finished the season in first place with 1,454 points, winning 7 out of 24 events. She became the fourth Slovenian ski jumper to win the overall World Cup title after Primož Peterka, her brother Peter Prevc, and Nika Križnar.

In the 2024–25 season, Prevc again won the overall ranking of the Two Nights Tour with World Cup victories in Garmisch-Partenkirchen and Oberstdorf. On 13 March 2025 in Oslo, she officially retained the overall World Cup title after going on a seven-match winning streak, becoming the third woman after Sara Takanashi and Maren Lundby to win more than one World Cup title. The next day, Prevc set a women's world record at 236 metres (774 ft) during the training session at the ski flying hill in Vikersund. At the 2024–25 World Cup season finale in Lahti, she broke several records. In the final match of the season, Prevc won by a record points margin over the runner-up, after having a 51.4-point lead over second-place finisher Selina Freitag. She also set the record for the most points scored in a women's World Cup season with 1,933, surpassing the 1,909 points set by Lundby in the 2018–19 season. Additionally, she finished the season with ten consecutive World Cup victories, tying Takanashi's record set in 2015–16. She also tied another record held by Takanashi for the most World Cup victories in a single season, with fifteen.

In the same season, Prevc became world champion in both women's individual events (normal hill and large hill) at the 2025 Nordic World Ski Championships in Trondheim, therefore becoming the first woman to win two individual gold medals at the same championship. In addition, she also won a silver medal in the mixed team event together with Klinec, Anže Lanišek and her brother Domen Prevc.

Prevc made her Winter Olympics debut in 2026, serving as a flag bearer for Slovenia with her brother Domen at the opening ceremony. After winning the silver medal in the women's normal hill event, she joined two of her brothers (Peter and Cene) as Olympic medallists in ski jumping. A few days later, she won gold with the Slovenian team in the mixed team competition, along with her brother Domen, Lanišek and Nika Vodan. This made the Prevc siblings the third family with at least four siblings to each win an Olympic medal.

== Personal life ==
Prevc was born in Kranj to Božidar and Julijana Prevc; the family has since been living in the village of Dolenja Vas. She has three brothers and a sister. All three of her brothers, Peter, Cene and Domen, are also ski jumpers. Her sister, Ema, does not ski jump, and instead practices ballet. Her father, who owns a furniture business, is an international ski jumping referee.

== Major tournament results ==
=== Winter Olympics ===
Year	Normal hill	Large hill	Mixed team
(Italy) Milano Cortina 2026	2	3	1

=== FIS Nordic World Ski Championships ===
Year	Normal hill	Large hill	Team NH	Mixed team
(Slovenia) Planica 2023	17	40	4	—
(Norway) Trondheim 2025	1	1	4	2

=== FIS Nordic Junior World Ski Championships ===
Year	Normal hill	Team NH	Mixed team
(Finland) Lahti 2021	11	3	—
(Poland) Zakopane 2022	1	1	2
(Canada) Whistler 2023	2	2	1

== World Cup results ==
=== Overall standings ===
Season	Position	Points
2021–22	22	199
2022–23	19	366
2023–24	1	1,454
2024–25	1	1,933
2025–26	1	2,676

=== Individual wins ===
No.	Season	Date	Location	Hill	Hill size	
1	2023–24	16 December 2023	(Switzerland) Engelberg	Gross-Titlis-Schanze	Large	HS140
2	2023–24	30 December 2023	(Germany) Garmisch-Partenkirchen	Große Olympiaschanze	Large	HS142
3	2023–24	3 January 2024	(Austria) Villach	Villacher Alpenarena	Normal	HS98
4	2023–24	4 January 2024	(Austria) Villach	Villacher Alpenarena	Normal	HS98
5	2023–24	19 January 2024	(Japan) Zaō	Yamagata	Normal	HS102
6	2023–24	28 January 2024	(Slovenia) Ljubno	Savina	Normal	HS94
7	2023–24	13 March 2024	(Norway) Trondheim	Granåsen	Large	HS138
8	2024–25	23 November 2024	(Norway) Lillehammer	Lysgårdsbakken	Large	HS140
9	2024–25	21 December 2024	(Switzerland) Engelberg	Gross-Titlis-Schanze	Large	HS140
10	2024–25	31 December 2024	(Germany) Garmisch-Partenkirchen	Große Olympiaschanze	Large	HS142
11	2024–25	1 January 2025	(Germany) Oberstdorf	Schattenbergschanze	Large	HS137
12	2024–25	24 January 2025	(Japan) Zaō	Yamagata	Normal	HS102
13	2024–25	7 February 2025	(United States) Lake Placid	MacKenzie Intervale	Large	HS128
14	2024–25	8 February 2025	(United States) Lake Placid	MacKenzie Intervale	Large	HS128
15	2024–25	15 February 2025	(Slovenia) Ljubno	Savina	Normal	HS94
16	2024–25	16 February 2025	(Slovenia) Ljubno	Savina	Normal	HS94
17	2024–25	22 February 2025	(Austria) Hinzenbach	Aigner-Schanze	Normal	HS90
18	2024–25	23 February 2025	(Austria) Hinzenbach	Aigner-Schanze	Normal	HS90
19	2024–25	13 March 2025	(Norway) Oslo	Holmenkollbakken	Large	HS134
20	2024–25	15 March 2025	(Norway) Vikersund	Vikersundbakken	Flying	HS240
21	2024–25	20 March 2025	(Finland) Lahti	Salpausselkä	Large	HS130
22	2024–25	21 March 2025	(Finland) Lahti	Salpausselkä	Large	HS130
23	2025–26	30 November 2025	(Sweden) Falun	Lugnet	Large	HS132
24	2025–26	5 December 2025	(Poland) Wisła	Malinka	Large	HS134
25	2025–26	13 December 2025	(Germany) Klingenthal	Vogtland Arena	Large	HS140
26	2025–26	21 December 2025	(Switzerland) Engelberg	Gross-Titlis-Schanze	Large	HS140
27	2025–26	31 December 2025	(Germany) Garmisch-Partenkirchen	Große Olympiaschanze	Large	HS142
28	2025–26	5 January 2026	(Austria) Villach	Villacher Alpenarena	Normal	HS98
29	2025–26	6 January 2026	(Austria) Villach	Villacher Alpenarena	Normal	HS98
30	2025–26	10 January 2026	(Slovenia) Ljubno	Savina	Normal	HS94
31	2025–26	11 January 2026	(Slovenia) Ljubno	Savina	Normal	HS94
32	2025–26	16 January 2026	(China) Zhangjiakou	Snow Ruyi	Large	HS140
33	2025–26	17 January 2026	(China) Zhangjiakou	Snow Ruyi	Large	HS140
34	2025–26	24 January 2026	(Japan) Sapporo	Ōkurayama	Large	HS137
35	2025–26	25 January 2026	(Japan) Sapporo	Ōkurayama	Large	HS137
36	2025–26	28 February 2026	(Austria) Hinzenbach	Aigner-Schanze	Normal	HS90
37	2025–26	5 March 2026	(Finland) Lahti	Salpausselkä	Large	HS130
38	2025–26	6 March 2026	(Finland) Lahti	Salpausselkä	Large	HS130
39	2025–26	14 March 2026	(Norway) Oslo	Holmenkollbakken	Large	HS134
40	2025–26	28 March 2026	(Slovenia) Planica	Letalnica bratov Gorišek	Flying	HS240

=== Individual starts ===
Key
1	Winner
2	Runner-up
3	Third place
—	Did not compete
q	Failed to qualify

Season	1	2	3	4	5	6	7	8	9	10	11	12	13	14	15	16	17	18	19	20	21	22	23	24	25	26	27	28	29	30	31	32	33
2021–22	Nizhny Tagil	Nizhny Tagil	Lillehammer	Lillehammer	Klingenthal	Klingenthal	Ramsau am Dachstein	Ljubno ob Savinji	Ljubno ob Savinji	Willingen	Willingen	Hinzenbach	Hinzenbach	Lillehammer	Lillehammer	Oslo	Oslo	Oberhof	Oberhof
2021–22	23	38	11	25	25	26	—	11	7	11	13	—	—	—	—	—	—	11	12
2022–23	Wisła	Wisła	Lillehammer	Lillehammer	Titisee-Neustadt	Villach	Villach	Ljubno ob Savinji	Ljubno ob Savinji	Sapporo	Sapporo	Zaō Onsen	Zaō Onsen	Hinterzarten	Hinterzarten	Willingen	Willingen	Hinzenbach	Hinzenbach	Râșnov	Râșnov	Oslo	Oslo	Lillehammer	Lillehammer	Lahti
2022–23	25	28	7	32	28	16	12	26	32	24	q	17	8	—	—	—	—	3	5	13	7	13	23	22	24	14
2023–24	Lillehammer	Lillehammer	Engelberg	Engelberg	Garmisch-Partenkirchen	Oberstdorf	Villach	Villach	Sapporo	Sapporo	Zaō Onsen	Ljubno ob Savinji	Ljubno ob Savinji	Willingen	Willingen	Hinzenbach	Hinzenbach	Lahti	Oslo	Oslo	Trondheim	Trondheim	Vikersund	Planica
2023–24	10	17	7	1	1	5	1	1	10	10	1	2	1	15	2	4	2	10	6	2	5	1	11	3
2024–25	Lillehammer	Lillehammer	Zhangjiakou	Zhangjiakou	Engelberg	Garmisch-Partenkirchen	Oberstdorf	Villach	Villach	Sapporo	Sapporo	Zaō Onsen	Zaō Onsen	Willingen	Lake Placid, New York	Lake Placid, New York	Ljubno ob Savinji	Ljubno ob Savinji	Hinzenbach	Hinzenbach	Oslo	Vikersund	Lahti	Lahti
2024–25	1	11	3	5	1	1	1	2	3	11	6	1	3	6	1	1	1	1	1	1	1	1	1	1
2025–26	Lillehammer	Lillehammer	Falun	Falun	Wisła	Wisła	Klingenthal	Klingenthal	Engelberg	Engelberg	Garmisch-Partenkirchen	Oberstdorf	Villach	Villach	Ljubno ob Savinji	Ljubno ob Savinji	Zhangjiakou	Zhangjiakou	Zaō Onsen	Zaō Onsen	Sapporo	Sapporo	Willingen	Willingen	Hinzenbach	Hinzenbach	Lahti	Lahti	Oslo	Oslo	Vikersund	Vikersund	Planica
2025–26	15	3	2	1	q (Note: Disqualified in the qualifiers)	1	2	1	2	1	1	4	1	1	1	1	1	1	4	2	1	1	2	3	1	3	1	1	1	6	3	2	1

Notes

Olympic Games
Preceded by Ilka Štuhec and Rok Marguč	Flagbearer for Slovenia; Milano Cortina 2026	Succeeded by Incumbent
