= Annika Belshaw =

American ski jumper (born 2002)

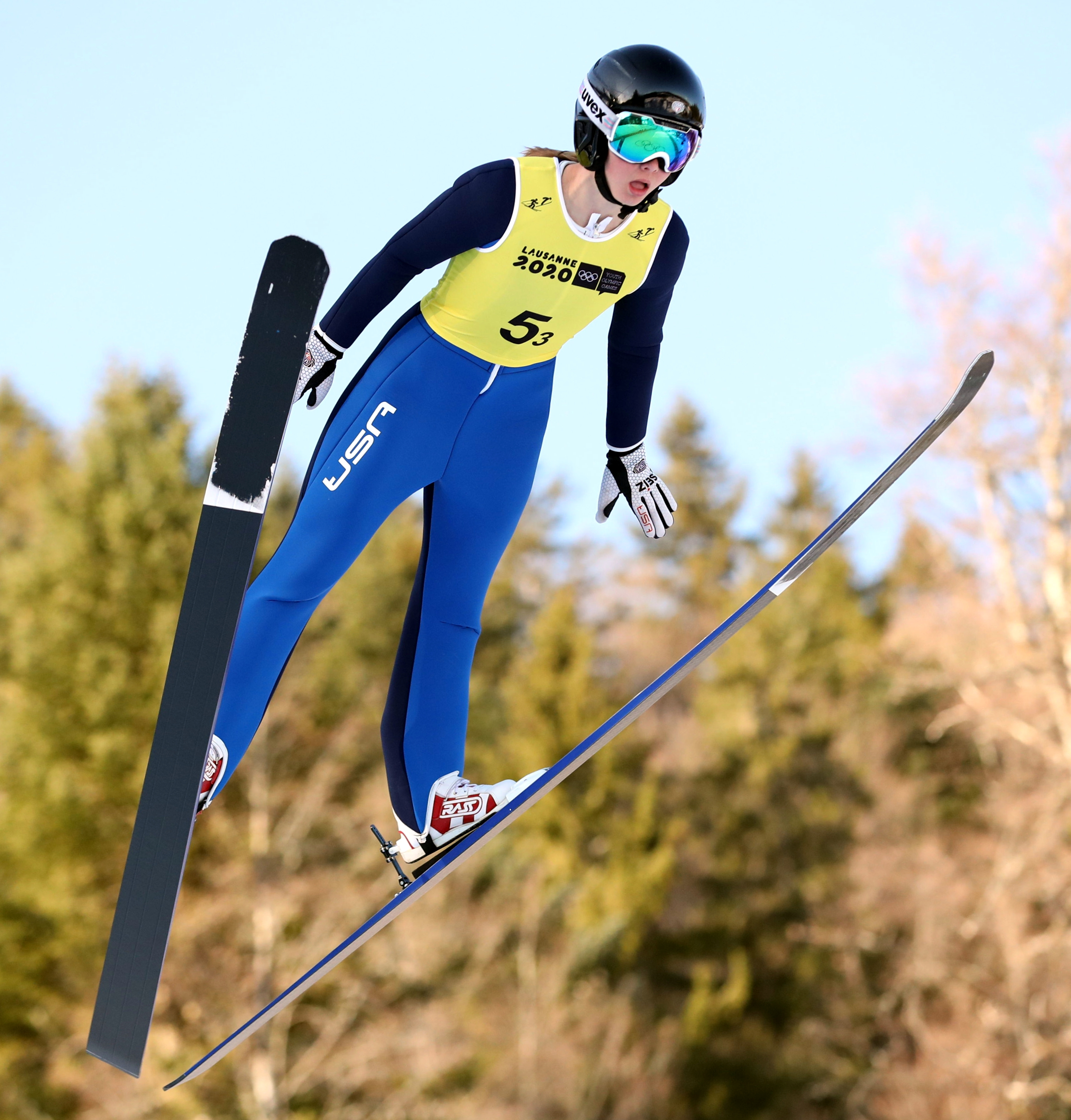
- Belshaw at the 2020 Winter Youth Olympics

Personal information
- Born: June 13, 2002 (age 24) Steamboat Springs, Colorado, U.S.

Sport
- Sport: Ski jumping

Annika Belshaw (born June 13, 2002) is an American former ski jumper.

== Career ==
Belshaw represented the United States at the 2020 Winter Youth Olympics in ski jumping and Nordic combined.

During the 2021–22 FIS Ski Jumping Continental Cup, she earned her first career Continental Cup victory and had seven top-10 finishes to finish fourth in the overall Continental Cup standings. This was the best U.S. finish since Sarah Hendrickson finished second in 2015. She was subsequently named U.S. Ski and Snowboard's 2022 Ski Jumping Athlete of the Year.

In January 2026, she was selected to represent the United States at the 2026 Winter Olympics. On February 7, 2026, she competed in the normal hill event and finished in 21st place. A week later on February 15, 2026, she competed in the large hill, where she was disqualified because her skis exceeded the maximum length, being over one centimeter too long.

On July 26, 2026, she announced her immediate retirement via social media.

== Personal life ==
Her younger brother, Erik Belshaw, is also a ski jumper.
