= Heidi Dyhre Traaserud =

Norwegian ski jumper (born 2003)

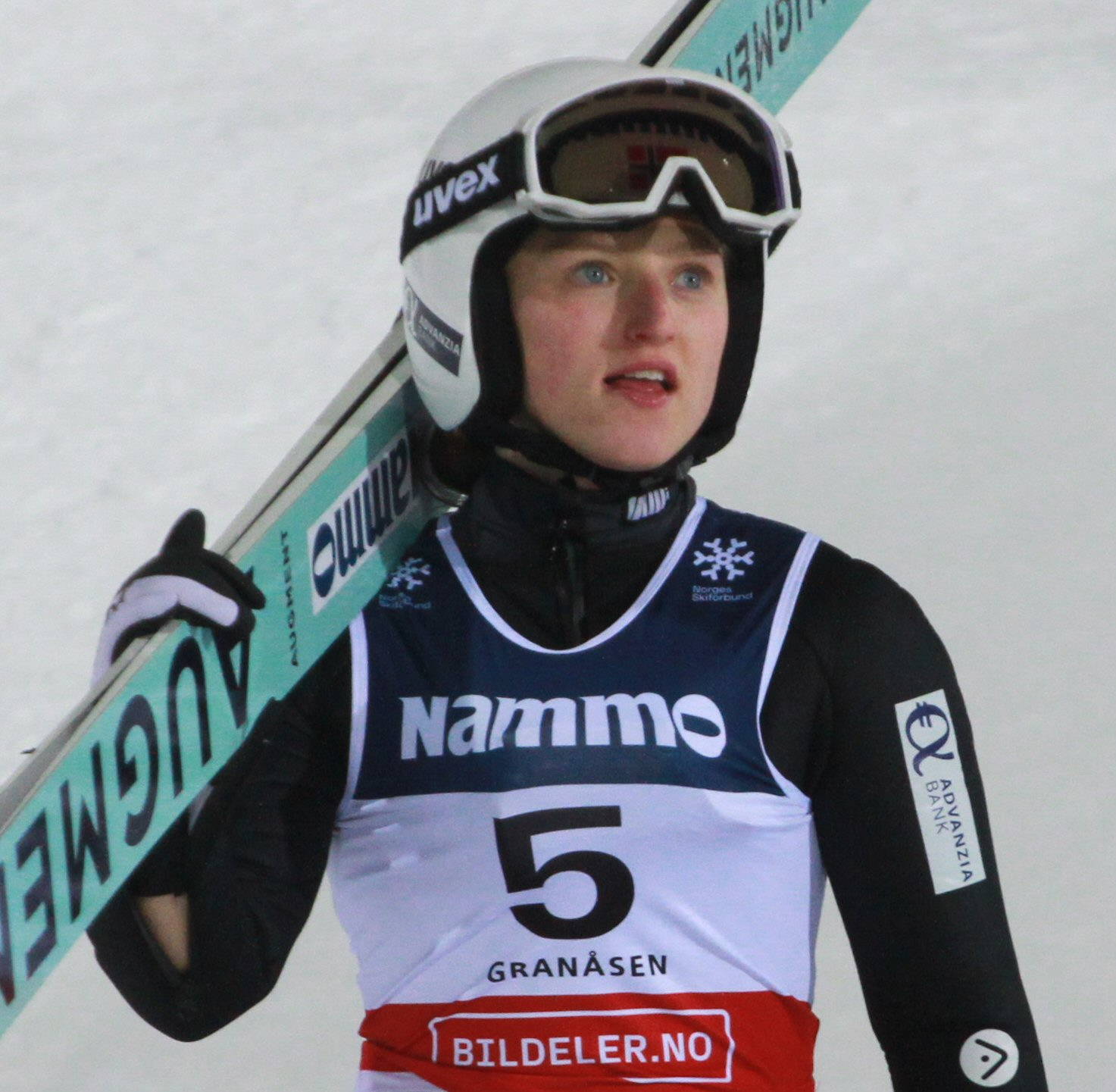

Personal information
- Nationality: Norway
- Born: 10 July 2003 (age 23) Skien, Norway

Sport
- Sport: Skiing
- Club: Heddal IL

Achievements and titles
- Personal bests: 233.5 m (766 ft); Vikersund, 22 March 2026
Medal record
Women's ski jumping
Representing Norway
World Championships
Gold medal – first place	2025 Trondheim	Team NH
- Updated on 22 March 2026

Heidi Dyhre Traaserud (born 10 July 2003) is a Norwegian ski jumper. Her achievements include winning a team gold medal in the world championships in 2025.

== Career ==
Born in Skien on 10 July 2003, Traaserud represented Norway at FIS Nordic World Ski Championships in 2025.

Having placed 14th in the Individual NH at the FIS Nordic World Ski Championships 2025 in Trondheim, she won a gold medal in women's team normal hill with the Norwegian team at the 2025 world championships.
