= Paige Jones =

American ski jumper (born 2002)

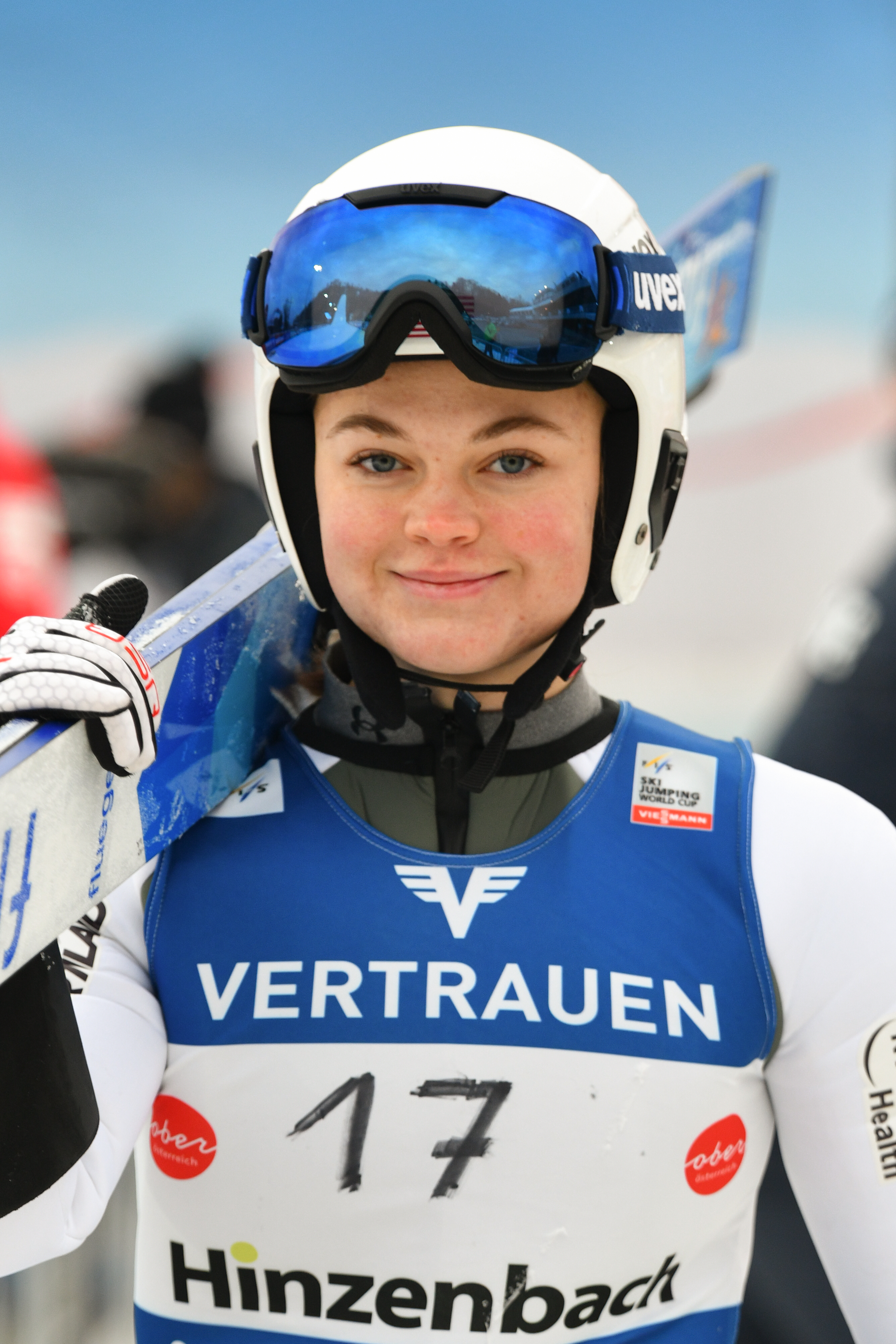
- Jones in 2023

Personal information
- Born: August 30, 2002 (age 23) Park City, Utah, U.S.

Sport
- Sport: Ski jumping

Paige Jones (born August 30, 2002) is an American ski jumper.

== Early life and education ==
Jones attends the University of North Dakota as a distance student majoring in Biomedical engineering.

== Career ==
Jones represented the United States at the 2020 Winter Youth Olympics. At the FIS Nordic World Ski Championships 2021 she became the first woman to ever jump an Olympic large hill at a World Championships event. She was named U.S. Ski and Snowboard's 2021 Ski Jumping Athlete of the Year. She crashed at junior nationals in March 2021, which resulted in a broken fibula, torn deltoid ligament and a disrupted ankle joint. As a result, she failed to qualify for the 2022 Winter Olympics.

In January 2026, she was selected to represent the United States at the 2026 Winter Olympics. During the normal hill event she finished in 23rd place.

== Personal life ==
In May 2025, Jones became engaged to Olympic luger, Sean Hollander. They met in Lake Placid, New York, where Hollander was training luge and Jones was competing in ski jumping nationals.
