= Liu Qi (ski jumper) =

Chinese ski jumper (born 1996)

Liu Qi 刘奇
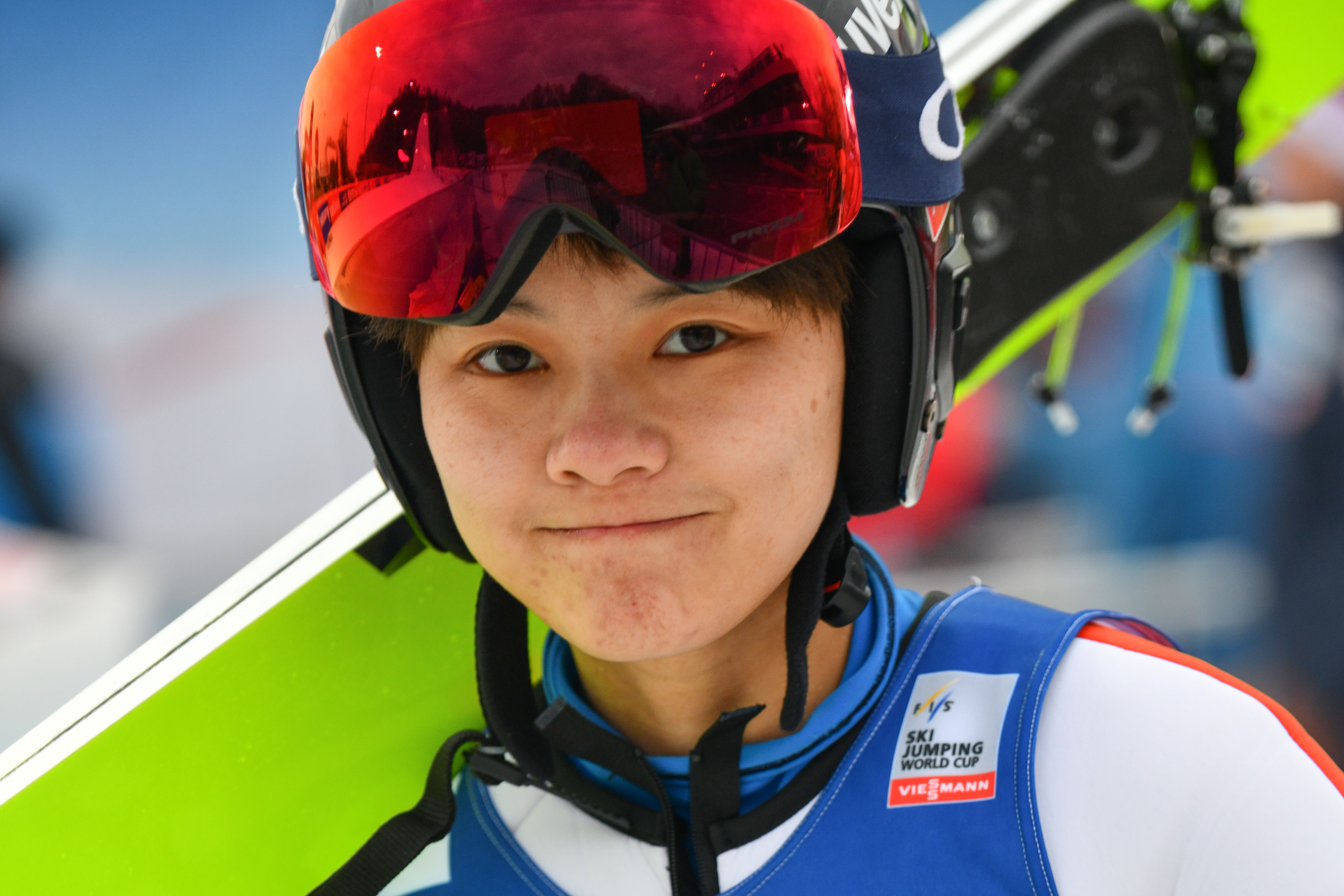

Personal information
- Nationality: China
- Born: 27 February 1996 (age 30) Jilin City, Jilin, China

Sport
- Sport: Skiing
- Club: Chinese Ski Association

World Cup career
- Seasons: 2013–present
- Indiv. starts: 15
- Updated on 25 March 2018

Liu Qi (Chinese: 刘奇, born 27 February 1996) is a Chinese ski jumper.

== Biography ==
Liu Qi was born on 27 February 1996 in Jilin. Her father was a truck driver in 2012. Liu began training in ski jumping when she was 11 years old. She became a member of the Chinese national ski jumping team in 2012, competing in the 2012–13 FIS Ski Jumping World Cup where she placed seventh. Her ranking in the competition was the highest among Chinese athletes. Liu injured her ankle in 2017 and the surgery was unsuccessful so she retired from the sport.

Liu came out of retirement in 2019. The Jilin Provincial Snow Sports Management Center (Chinese: 省雪上运动管理中心) found doctors to do surgery on her ankle and help her with recovery. She competed in the FIS Nordic World Ski Championships 2023, scoring 205.3.3 points and placing 24th in a women's individual event. Liu set the all-time best performance by a Chinese athlete in the event at the FIS Nordic World Ski Championships. Liu received three gold medals in 2024 in the 14th National Winter Games of China which was every medal in the adult women's category.

== World Cup ==
=== Standings ===
Season	Overall	L3
2012/13	36	N/A
2013/14	57	N/A
2014/15	—	N/A
2015/16	—	N/A
2016/17	—	N/A
2017/18	—	N/A

=== Individual starts (15) ===
Season	1	2	3	4	5	6	7	8	9	10	11	12	13	14	15	16	17	18	19	Points
2012/13	Lillehammer	Sochi	Sochi	Ramsau am Dachstein	Schonach	Schonach	Hinterzten	Hinterzten	Sapporo	Sapporo	Zaō Onsen	Zaō Onsen	Ljubno	Ljubno	Trondheim	Oslo				52
2012/13	–	44	–	38	–	–	–	–	–	–	–	–	15	32	7	–				52
2013/14	Lillehammer	Hinterzten	Hinterzten	Chaykovsky, Perm Krai	Chaykovsky, Perm Krai	Sapporo	Sapporo	Zaō Onsen	Zaō Onsen	Planica	Planica	Hinzenbach	Hinzenbach	Râșnov	Râșnov	Oslo	Falun	Planica		8
2013/14	q	45	36	40	23	–	–	–	–	–	–	–	–	–	–	–	–	–		8
2014/15	Lillehammer	Sapporo	Sapporo	Zaō Onsen	Oberstdorf	Oberstdorf	Hinzenbach	Hinzenbach	Râșnov	Râșnov	Ljubno	Ljubno	Oslo							0
2014/15	–	q	–	–	–	–	–	–	–	–	–	–	–							0
2015/16	Lillehammer	Nizhny Tagil	Nizhny Tagil	Sapporo	Sapporo	Zaō Onsen	Zaō Onsen	Oberstdorf	Oberstdorf	Oslo	Hinzenbach	Hinzenbach	Ljubno	Ljubno	Lahti	Almaty	Almaty			0
2015/16	q	–	–	q	q	34	q	–	–	–	–	–	–	–	–	–	–			0
2016/17	Lillehammer	Lillehammer	Nizhny Tagil	Nizhny Tagil	Oberstdorf	Oberstdorf	Sapporo	Sapporo	Zaō Onsen	Zaō Onsen	Râșnov	Râșnov	Hinzenbach	Hinzenbach	Ljubno	Ljubno	Pyeongchang	Pyeongchang	Oslo	0
2016/17	q	q	–	–	–	–	q	q	q	q	41	40	38	40	q	q	–	–	–	0
2017/18	Lillehammer	Lillehammer	Lillehammer	Hinterzarten	Sapporo	Sapporo	Zaō Onsen	Zaō Onsen	Ljubno	Ljubno	Râșnov	Râșnov	Oslo	Oberstdorf	Oberstdorf					0
2017/18	–	–	–	–	–	–	–	–	–	–	–	–	–	–	–					0
