= Ski jumping at the Winter Youth Olympics =

- Governing body: FIS
- Events: 5 (men: 2; womens: 2; mixed: 1)

Games
- 2012; 2016; 2020; 2024

Ski jumping is one of the sports featured at the Winter Youth Olympics. It has been part of the games since the inaugural edition in 2012.

== Medal summaries ==
=== Boys' individual ===
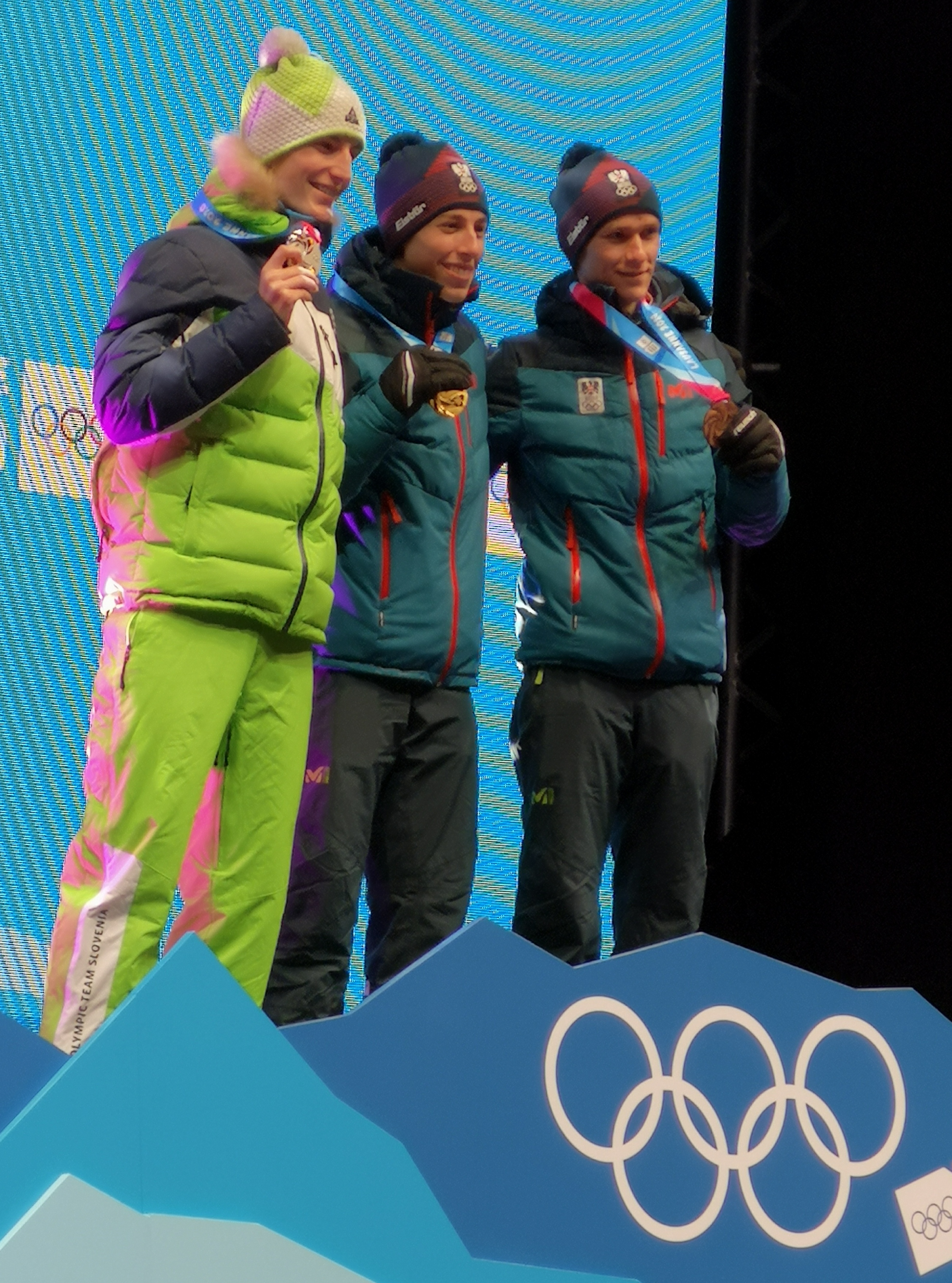
2020 podium

Games	Gold	Silver	Bronze
2012 Innsbruck	Anže Lanišek; Slovenia	Mats Søhagen Berggaard; Norway	Yukiya Satō; Japan
2016 Lillehammer	Bor Pavlovčič; Slovenia	Marius Lindvik; Norway	Jonathan Siegel; Germany
2020 Lausanne	Marco Wörgötter; Austria	Mark Hafnar; Slovenia	David Haagen; Austria
2024 Gangwon	Ilya Mizernykh; Kazakhstan	Niki Humml; Austria	Łukasz Łukaszczyk; Poland

=== Girls' individual ===
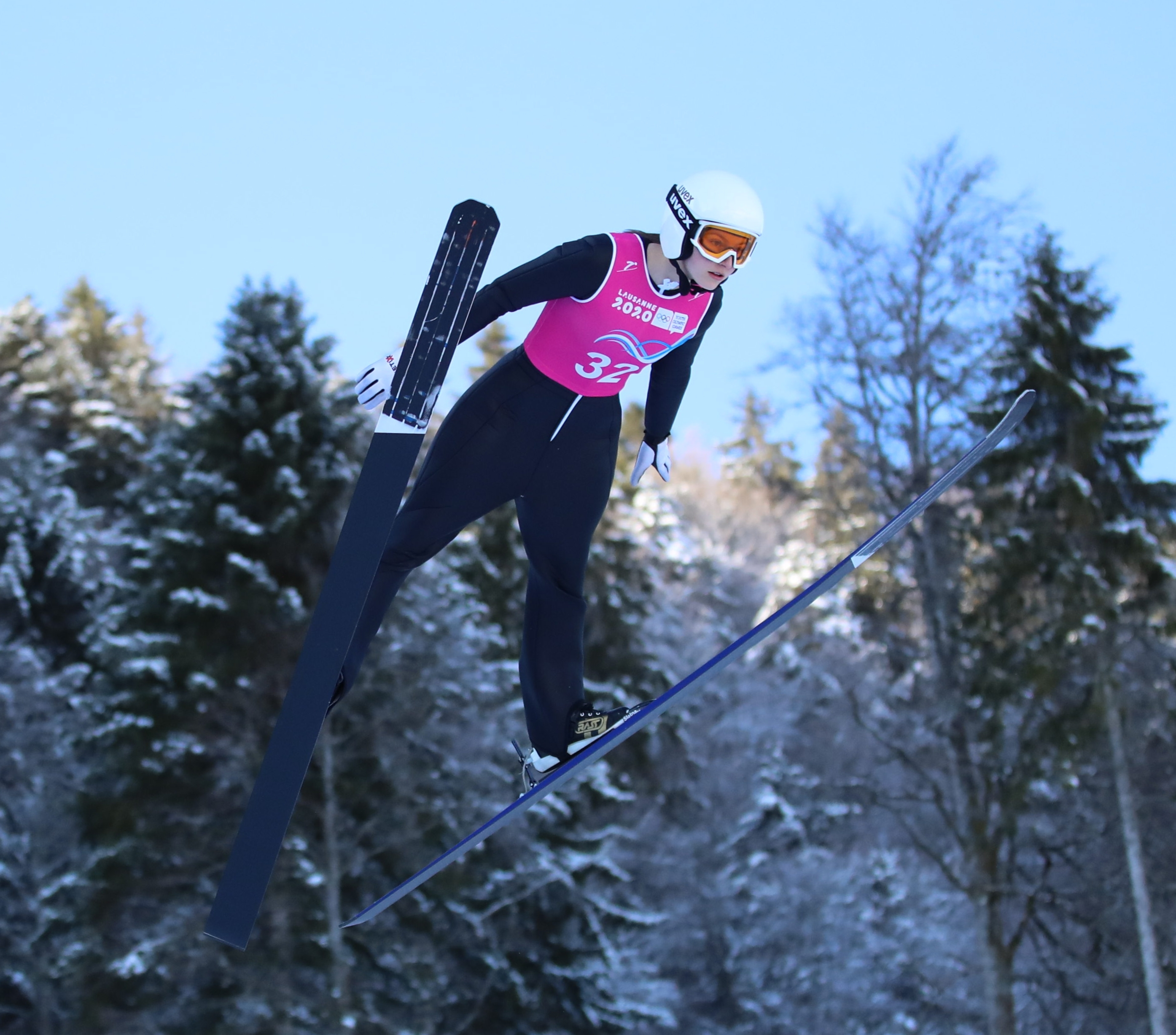
Joséphine Pagnier competing at the 2020 WYOG

Games	Gold	Silver	Bronze
2012 Innsbruck	Sara Takanashi; Japan	Katharina Althaus; Germany	Urša Bogataj; Slovenia
2016 Lillehammer	Ema Klinec; Slovenia	Sofia Tikhonova; Russia	Lara Malsiner; Italy
2020 Lausanne	Anna Shpyneva; Russia	Joséphine Pagnier; France	Štěpánka Ptáčková; Czech Republic
2024 Gangwon	Taja Bodlaj; Slovenia	Josie Johnson; United States	Ingvild Synnøve Midtskogen; Norway

=== Mixed team ===
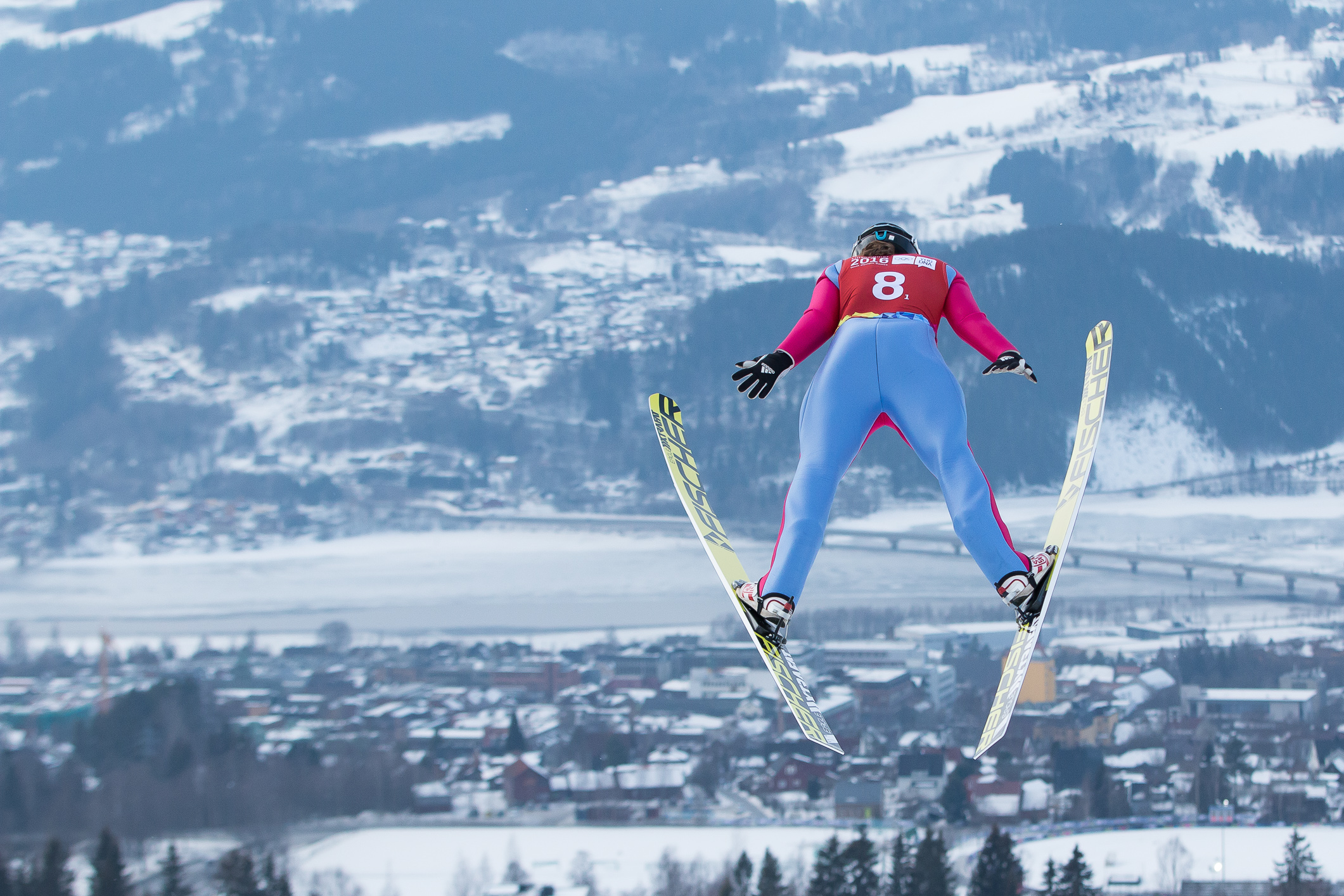
Mixed team competition 2016

Games	Gold	Silver	Bronze
2012 Innsbruck	Germany; Katharina Althaus; Tom Lubitz; Andreas Wellinger	Slovenia; Urša Bogataj; Luka Pintarič; Anže Lanišek	Canada; Taylor Henrich; Nathaniel Mah; Dusty Korek
2016 Lillehammer	Slovenia; Ema Klinec; Vid Vrhovnik; Bor Pavlovčič	Germany; Agnes Reisch; Tim Kopp; Jonathan Siegel	Austria; Julia Huber; Florian Dagn; Clemens Leitner
2020 Lausanne	Austria; Lisa Hirner; Stefan Rettenegger; Julia Mühlbacher; Marco Wörgötter	Japan; Ayane Miyazaki; Yuto Nishikata; Machiko Kubota; Sota Kudo	France; Emma Treand; Marco Heinis; Joséphine Pagnier; Valentin Foubert
2024 Gangwon	Slovenia; Ajda Košnjek; Urban Šimnic; Taja Bodlaj; Enej Faletič	Norway; Kjersti Græsli; Oddvar Gunnerød; Ingvild Synnøve Midtskogen; Mats Strandbraaten	Austria; Sara Pokorny; Niki Humml; Meghann Wadsak; Lukas Haagen

== Medal table ==
As of the 2024 Winter Youth Olympics.

Rank	Nation	Gold	Silver	Bronze	Total
1	Slovenia	6	2	1	9
2	Austria	2	1	3	6
3	Germany	1	2	1	4
4	Japan	1	1	1	3
5	Russia	1	1	0	2
6	Kazakhstan	1	0	0	1
7	Norway	0	3	1	4
8	France	0	1	1	2
9	United States	0	1	0	1
10	Canada	0	0	1	1
10	Czech Republic	0	0	1	1
10	Italy	0	0	1	1
10	Poland	0	0	1	1
Totals (13 entries)		12	12	12	36

== Participating nations ==
• = Did not compete in the sport, × = the country did not participate in the Games

Event	12	16	20	24	Years
Austria	2	2	4	4	4
Belarus	1	•	•	×	1
Bulgaria	1	•	•	•	1
Canada	2	•	2	1	3
China	1	•	1	4	3
Czech Republic	2	2	4	4	4
Estonia	1	1	3	1	4
Finland	2	1	4	4	4
France	2	2	3	4	4
Georgia	•	•	1	2	2
Germany	2	2	4	4	4
Great Britain	•	•	1	•	1
Hungary	1	2	1	•	3
Italy	2	2	4	4	4
Japan	2	2	3	4	4
Kazakhstan	1	1	4	4	4
Netherlands	1	•	•	•	1
Norway	2	2	4	4	4
Poland	2	2	4	4	4
Romania	1	2	4	4	4
Russia	2	2	4	×	3
Slovakia	•	•	•	3	1
Slovenia	2	2	4	4	4
South Korea	•	•	•	2	1
Switzerland	1	1	4	3	4
Turkey	1	1	•	•	2
Ukraine	1	1	4	4	4
United States	2	2	4	4	4
Total athletes	37	32	71	72	
Total countries	24	19	22	21	

== See also ==
- Ski jumping at the Winter Olympics
