= FIS Nordic World Ski Championships 2025 – Women's individual large hill =

Women's individual large hill at the FIS Nordic World Ski Championships 2025
- Venue: Granåsen Ski Centre
- Location: Trondheim, Norway
- Dates: 6 March (qualification); 7 March
- Competitors: 58 from 19 nations
- Winning points: 150.9

Medalists
gold medal	Nika Prevc	Slovenia
silver medal	Selina Freitag	Germany
bronze medal	Eirin Maria Kvandal	Norway

The Women's individual large hill competition at the FIS Nordic World Ski Championships 2025 was held on 6 and 7 March 2025.

== Results ==
=== Qualification ===
The qualification was held on 6 March at 20:30.

Rank	Bib	Name	Country	Distance (m)	Points	Notes
1	58	Nika Prevc	Slovenia	138.5	156.4	Q
2	51	Anna Odine Strøm	Norway	130.0	141.0	Q
3	54	Eirin Maria Kvandal	Norway	133.0	140.4	Q
4	55	Jacqueline Seifriedsberger	Austria	129.0	136.5	Q
5	44	Abigail Strate	Canada	126.0	123.3	Q
6	56	Selina Freitag	Germany	123.0	123.2	Q
7	49	Alexandria Loutitt	Canada	121.5	121.5	Q
8	48	Sara Takanashi	Japan	126.5	117.3	Q
9	42	Juliane Seyfarth	Germany	128.5	115.9	Q
10	46	Yuki Ito	Japan	123.5	115.3	Q
11	52	Eva Pinkelnig	Austria	118.5	114.8	Q
12	57	Agnes Reisch	Germany	124.0	113.3	Q
12	47	Katharina Schmid	Germany	115.5	113.3	Q
14	38	Julia Mühlbacher	Austria	121.5	108.8	Q
15	53	Lisa Eder	Austria	115.5	108.2	Q
16	45	Lara Malsiner	Italy	117.0	102.4	Q
17	34	Annika Belshaw	United States	117.5	101.5	Q
18	32	Liu Qi	China	117.5	100.0	Q
19	30	Anna Twardosz	Poland	117.5	97.3	Q
20	43	Yuka Seto	Japan	117.0	96.4	Q
21	40	Nozomi Maruyama	Japan	116.5	95.9	Q
22	50	Ema Klinec	Slovenia	107.5	93.2	Q
23	39	Jenny Rautionaho	Finland	112.5	91.5	Q
23	37	Josephine Pagnier	France	115.0	91.5	Q
25	36	Heidi Dyhre Traaserud	Norway	115.0	91.1	Q
26	29	Paige Jones	United States	114.0	91.0	Q
27	41	Ingvild Synnøve Midtskogen	Norway	112.0	90.2	Q
28	33	Nicole Maurer	Canada	113.5	89.6	Q
29	21	Karolína Indráčková	Czech Republic	111.5	84.1	Q
30	19	Pola Beltowska	Poland	109.5	80.7	Q
31	27	Emma Chervet	France	107.5	80.1	Q
32	22	Josie Johnson	United States	108.0	78.2	Q
33	13	Frida Westman	Sweden	110.5	78.1	Q
34	31	Julia Kykkänen	Finland	106.0	77.4	Q
35	24	Weng Yangning	China	108.0	75.1	Q
36	1	Veronika Jenčová	Czech Republic	107.0	74.7	Q
37	7	Jessica Malsiner	Italy	103.5	72.7	Q
38	26	Dong Bing	China	108.0	71.1	Q
39	10	Martina Zanitzer	Italy	102.5	70.2	Q
40	23	Anežka Indráčková	Czech Republic	103.5	67.8	Q
41	35	Annika Sieff	Italy	101.0	64.9	
42	28	Tina Erzar	Slovenia	97.0	62.6	
43	17	Sina Arnet	Switzerland	99.0	60.4	
44	25	Katra Komar	Slovenia	98.0	59.5	
45	3	Nicole Konderla	Poland	97.5	57.1	
46	9	Klára Ulrichová	Czech Republic	98.5	56.7	
47	8	Kira Mária Kapustíková	Slovakia	96.5	50.5	
48	4	Pan Yutong	China	96.0	48.0	
49	16	Tamara Mesíková	Slovakia	88.0	45.7	
50	11	Samantha Macuga	United States	91.5	45.4	
51	20	Daniela Haralambie	Romania	89.5	44.8	
52	18	Rea Kindlimann	Switzerland	89.5	41.0	
53	12	Zhanna Hlukhova	Ukraine	85.0	31.5	
54	5	Alyona Sviridenko	Kazakhstan	84.0	30.8	
55	14	Tetiana Pylypchuk	Ukraine	75.0	9.9	
56	6	Veronika Shishkina	Kazakhstan	67.0	1.3	
57	15	Anastassiya Gorunova	Kazakhstan	65.0	0.0	
57	2	Viktoriya Ruleva	Kazakhstan	61.0	0.0	

=== Final ===
The final was started on 7 March at 16:30.

Rank	Bib	Name	Country	Distance (m)	Points	Notes
1st place, gold medalist(s)	40	Nika Prevc	Slovenia	134.5	150.9	
2nd place, silver medalist(s)	38	Selina Freitag	Germany	131.0	136.7	
3rd place, bronze medalist(s)	36	Eirin Maria Kvandal	Norway	136.0	132.4	
4	34	Eva Pinkelnig	Austria	126.0	125.0	
5	33	Anna Odine Strøm	Norway	120.5	120.7	
6	35	Lisa Eder	Austria	122.5	117.7	
7	22	Nozomi Maruyama	Japan	128.0	114.3	
8	37	Jacqueline Seifriedsberger	Austria	119.0	114.1	
9	28	Yuki Ito	Japan	120.0	112.0	
10	31	Alexandria Loutitt	Canada	119.0	109.8	
11	26	Abigail Strate	Canada	122.0	107.4	
12	30	Sara Takanashi	Japan	124.5	107.0	
13	24	Juliane Seyfarth	Germany	123.0	104.3	
14	29	Agnes Reisch	Germany	115.5	98.1	
15	32	Ema Klinec	Slovenia	112.0	96.2	
16	18	Heidi Dyhre Traaserud	Norway	109.0	92.5	
17	27	Lara Malsiner	Italy	113.0	92.4	
18	20	Julia Mühlbacher	Austria	116.0	89.1	
19	39	Katharina Schmid	Germany	100.5	88.1	
20	19	Josephine Pagnier	France	112.5	87.5	
21	15	Liu Qi	China	111.0	82.3	
22	6	Karolína Indráčková	Czech Republic	103.0	80.5	
23	12	Paige Jones	United States	106.0	80.2	
24	16	Nicole Maurer	Canada	111.5	79.0	
24	14	Julia Kykkänen	Finland	108.0	79.0	
26	17	Annika Belshaw	United States	108.0	77.6	
27	21	Jenny Rautionaho	Finland	108.5	77.4	
28	4	Frida Westman	Sweden	102.5	77.2	
29	10	Dong Bing	China	109.5	76.5	
30	1	Veronika Jenčová	Czech Republic	105.0	73.3	
31	25	Yuka Seto	Japan	105.5	72.0	
32	5	Pola Beltowska	Poland	105.0	70.2	
33	3	Martina Zanitzer	Italy	103.5	66.9	
34	9	Weng Yangning	China	106.0	64.7	
35	7	Josie Johnson	United States	101.0	63.5	
36	13	Anna Twardosz	Poland	99.5	60.0	
37	2	Jessica Malsiner	Italy	88.0	50.7	
38	8	Anežka Indráčková	Czech Republic	97.0	47.3	
39	11	Emma Chervet	France	88.5	40.2	
	23	Ingvild Synnøve Midtskogen	Norway	Disqualified		
