= Ski jumping at the 2022 Winter Olympics – Women's normal hill individual =

Women's normal hill individual at the XXIV Olympic Winter Games
- Ski jumping
- Venue: Snow Ruyi, Zhangjiakou
- Date: 5 February 2022
- Competitors: 40 from 16 nations
- Winning points: 239.0

Medalists
1st place, gold medalist(s)		Urša Bogataj	Slovenia
2nd place, silver medalist(s)		Katharina Althaus	Germany
3rd place, bronze medalist(s)		Nika Križnar	Slovenia

The Women's normal hill individual competition of the Beijing 2022 Olympics was held on 5 February, at the Snow Ruyi hill in Zhangjiakou.

== Summary ==
Urša Bogataj of Slovenia won the event; it was also her first Olympic medal. Katharina Althaus of Germany repeated her 2018 performance and won the silver medal, thereby becoming the first woman who won multiple Olympic medals in ski jumping. Nika Križnar, also from Slovenia, won bronze. It was Slovenia's first ever gold medal in ski jumping.

The 2018 champion, Maren Lundby, withdrew from the Olympics. The 2018 silver medalist, Althaus, and the bronze medalist, Sara Takanashi, both qualified. Ema Klinec competed as the 2021 World champion. Marita Kramer was leading the 2021–22 FIS Ski Jumping World Cup at the start of the Olympics, having won six out of eleven events before the Olympics. However, she had to withdraw from the games due to a coronavirus infection. In the World Cup ranking, she was followed by Althaus and Bogataj.

Althaus was leading after the first round, with Bogataj second and Križnar third. In the final round, Bogataj jumped six meters further than Althaus, and won the competition with an overall score of 239 points.

== Results ==
The final was started at 18:45.

Rank	Bib	Name	Country	Round 1			Final round			Total
Rank	Bib	Name	Country	Distance (m)	Points	Rank	Distance (m)	Points	Rank	Points
1st place, gold medalist(s)	39	Urša Bogataj	Slovenia	108.0	118.0	2	100.0	121.0	1	239.0
2nd place, silver medalist(s)	40	Katharina Althaus	Germany	105.5	121.1	1	94.0	115.7	3	236.8
3rd place, bronze medalist(s)	37	Nika Križnar	Slovenia	103.0	113.9	3	99.5	118.1	2	232.0
4	36	Sara Takanashi	Japan	98.5	108.7	5	100.0	115.4	4	224.1
5	38	Ema Klinec	Slovenia	100.0	112.1	4	90.5	103.3	6	215.4
6	35	Silje Opseth	Norway	92.5	94.7	12	95.0	105.8	5	200.5
7	22	Irina Avvakumova	ROC	95.0	99.6	9	89.5	96.7	8	196.3
8	30	Lisa Eder	Austria	92.0	92.3	15	90.0	101.1	7	193.4
9	29	Špela Rogelj	Slovenia	93.0	101.7	8	82.0	82.5	18	184.2
10	7	Irma Makhinia	ROC	90.0	85.4	17	90.0	95.5	9	180.9
11	32	Joséphine Pagnier	France	96.0	102.1	7	78.5	77.4	22	179.5
12	34	Daniela Iraschko-Stolz	Austria	91.5	94.1	14	80.5	83.9	16	178.0
13	26	Yuki Ito	Japan	94.0	95.5	10	82.0	81.2	20	176.7
14	21	Yūka Setō	Japan	94.5	94.6	13	83.5	81.9	19	176.5
15	31	Anna Odine Strøm	Norway	91.5	91.5	16	84.0	84.5	15	176.0
16	23	Frida Westman	Sweden	87.0	80.9	21	90.0	94.6	10	175.5
17	25	Aleksandra Kustova	ROC	88.0	81.4	20	85.0	90.0	13	171.4
18	27	Kaori Iwabuchi	Japan	94.5	94.8	11	83.0	74.8	24	169.6
19	20	Juliane Seyfarth	Germany	86.0	78.7	23	88.0	89.9	14	168.6
20	33	Eva Pinkelnig	Austria	87.0	83.9	18	84.0	82.6	17	166.5
21	28	Thea Minyan Bjørseth	Norway	99.5	104.1	6	73.0	59.9	29	164.0
22	19	Selina Freitag	Germany	80.0	69.8	28	90.0	93.2	11	163.0
23	15	Abigail Strate	Canada	75.5	71.7	26	84.5	90.2	12	161.9
24	24	Pauline Heßler	Germany	89.5	80.9	21	83.0	80.7	21	161.6
25	17	Daniela Haralambie	Romania	88.5	83.0	19	79.5	73.2	25	156.2
26	13	Sofia Tikhonova	ROC	78.5	70.3	27	83.0	76.5	23	146.8
27	18	Julia Kykkänen	Finland	82.5	72.6	25	75.0	67.5	26	140.1
28	14	Karolína Indráčková	Czech Republic	82.0	77.4	24	65.0	53.3	30	130.7
29	4	Jessica Malsiner	Italy	76.5	62.0	30	75.5	62.4	27	124.4
30	2	Anežka Indráčková	Czech Republic	79.0	62.8	29	72.5	60.5	28	123.3
31	6	Dong Bing	China	73.0	57.3	31	did not advance			
32	11	Jenny Rautionaho	Finland	66.5	48.5	32	did not advance			
33	5	Klára Ulrichová	Czech Republic	70.5	48.2	33	did not advance			
34	12	Julia Clair	France	64.0	43.3	34	did not advance			
35	8	Kinga Rajda	Poland	69.0	40.9	35	did not advance			
36	9	Nicole Konderla	Poland	64.0	37.8	36	did not advance			
37	1	Anna Hoffmann	United States	64.5	36.2	37	did not advance			
38	3	Peng Qingyue	China	63.5	31.3	38	did not advance			
	10	Sophie Sorschag	Austria	Disqualified			did not advance			
	16	Alexandria Loutitt	Canada	Disqualified			did not advance			
