= FIS Nordic World Ski Championships 2023 – Women's individual large hill =

Women's individual large hill at the FIS Nordic World Ski Championships 2023
- Venue: Bloudkova velikanka (HS138)
- Location: Planica, Slovenia
- Dates: 28 February March (qualification); 1 March
- Competitors: 40 from 15 nations
- Winning points: 264.4

Medalists
gold medal	Alexandria Loutitt	Canada
silver medal	Maren Lundby	Norway
bronze medal	Katharina Althaus	Germany

The Women's individual large hill competition at the FIS Nordic World Ski Championships 2023 was held on 28 February and 1 March 2023.

== Results ==
=== Qualification ===
The qualification was held on 28 February at 18:30.

Rank	Bib	Name	Country	Distance (m)	Points	Notes
1	49	Katharina Althaus	Germany	129.0	122.2	Q
2	37	Alexandria Loutitt	Canada	128.5	115.7	Q
3	24	Maren Lundby	Norway	131.0	114.9	Q
4	50	Eva Pinkelnig	Austria	123.5	111.5	Q
5	47	Ema Klinec	Slovenia	122.0	108.4	Q
6	48	Anna Odine Strøm	Norway	122.5	105.5	Q
7	46	Selina Freitag	Germany	124.5	104.2	Q
8	42	Yuki Ito	Japan	122.5	103.9	Q
9	23	Jenny Rautionaho	Finland	125.0	101.2	Q
9	40	Nozomi Maruyama	Japan	128.0	101.2	Q
11	38	Marita Kramer	Austria	121.5	100.8	Q
12	32	Julia Clair	France	119.5	100.4	Q
13	43	Nika Križnar	Slovenia	119.5	98.0	Q
14	45	Chiara Kreuzer	Austria	118.5	97.2	Q
15	44	Silje Opseth	Norway	118.0	94.7	Q
16	41	Abigail Strate	Canada	120.0	93.9	Q
17	39	Thea Minyan Bjørseth	Norway	117.0	93.0	Q
18	36	Joséphine Pagnier	France	117.0	92.1	Q
19	35	Yuka Seto	Japan	115.0	87.6	Q
20	30	Pauline Heßler	Germany	114.0	86.9	Q
21	29	Daniela Haralambie	Romania	113.5	83.9	Q
22	21	Julia Kykkänen	Finland	115.0	83.6	Q
23	28	Julia Mühlbacher	Austria	112.0	83.2	Q
24	8	Klára Ulrichová	Czech Republic	115.5	80.9	Q
25	31	Lara Malsiner	Italy	110.5	80.5	Q
26	26	Ringo Miyajima	Japan	112.0	80.0	Q
27	15	Li Xueyao	China	115.0	78.9	Q
28	20	Liu Qi	China	114.0	75.7	Q
29	27	Jessica Malsiner	Italy	109.0	75.2	Q
30	5	Kinga Rajda	Poland	105.5	74.7	Q
31	25	Maja Vtič	Slovenia	110.5	73.1	Q
32	17	Sina Arnet	Switzerland	111.0	72.3	Q
33	16	Wang Liangyao	China	114.0	71.7	Q
34	22	Annika Belshaw	United States	110.5	70.8	Q
35	13	Nicole Konderla	Poland	112.0	69.9	Q
36	33	Nika Prevc	Slovenia	103.5	69.6	Q
37	18	Karolína Indráčková	Czech Republic	108.0	65.6	Q
38	9	Samantha Macuga	United States	109.0	65.3	Q
39	11	Emely Torazza	Switzerland	107.0	65.1	Q
40	1	Zeng Ping	China	105.0	61.6	Q
41	10	Natalie Eilers	Canada	105.0	60.9	
42	6	Anežka Indráčková	Czech Republic	106.0	60.1	
42	34	Anna Rupprecht	Germany	113.0	60.1	
44	4	Alessia Mîțu-Coșca	Romania	99.5	56.3	
45	2	Paulina Cieślar	Poland	100.0	53.6	
46	12	Josie Johnson	United States	101.0	52.0	
47	14	Nicole Maurer	Canada	97.0	44.5	
48	3	Anna Twardosz	Poland	91.0	39.9	
49	7	Veronika Shishkina	Kazakhstan	90.5	31.8	
50	19	Paige Jones	United States	99.0	26.6	

=== Final ===
The first round was started on 1 March at 17:30 and the final round at 18:40.

Rank	Bib	Name	Country	Round 1			Final round			Total
Rank	Bib	Name	Country	Distance (m)	Points	Rank	Distance (m)	Points	Rank	Points
1st place, gold medalist(s)	27	Alexandria Loutitt	Canada	134.5	130.9	1	136.5	133.5	1	264.4
2nd place, silver medalist(s)	15	Maren Lundby	Norway	139.5	130.9	1	133.0	123.1	2	254.0
3rd place, bronze medalist(s)	39	Katharina Althaus	Germany	120.5	126.0	3	128.0	119.9	4	245.9
4	30	Nozomi Maruyama	Japan	129.0	125.6	4	125.5	117.3	8	242.9
5	38	Anna Odine Strøm	Norway	121.0	124.6	5	122.5	116.3	9	240.9
6	40	Eva Pinkelnig	Austria	121.0	123.3	6	123.0	114.6	10	237.9
7	37	Ema Klinec	Slovenia	117.0	115.5	11	131.5	121.0	3	236.5
8	29	Thea Minyan Bjørseth	Norway	124.0	116.6	9	126.0	114.1	11	230.7
9	35	Chiara Kreuzer	Austria	122.5	110.4	14	126.0	118.3	7	228.7
10	33	Nika Križnar	Slovenia	118.0	109.4	15	128.5	118.4	6	227.8
11	32	Yuki Ito	Japan	116.0	116.0	10	122.5	109.1	13	225.1
12	28	Marita Kramer	Austria	126.5	117.7	7	122.5	106.3	16	224.0
13	14	Jenny Rautionaho	Finland	126.0	113.1	12	124.5	110.0	12	223.1
14	26	Joséphine Pagnier	France	128.0	116.7	8	121.0	104.9	17	221.6
15	31	Abigail Strate	Canada	116.0	111.6	13	123.5	103.9	18	215.5
16	34	Silje Opseth	Norway	114.0	91.5	28	128.5	119.5	5	211.0
17	23	Julia Clair	France	116.0	100.3	23	122.5	107.2	15	207.5
18	19	Julia Mühlbacher	Austria	109.5	104.5	17	119.5	100.7	19	205.2
19	36	Selina Freitag	Germany	110.0	95.1	26	124.0	107.7	14	202.8
20	11	Liu Qi	China	114.0	102.1	21	123.5	99.0	21	201.1
21	20	Daniela Haralambie	Romania	114.0	99.2	24	118.5	99.7	20	198.9
22	22	Lara Malsiner	Italy	112.0	102.3	20	120.5	96.2	23	198.5
23	2	Kinga Rajda	Poland	115.0	102.9	19	118.5	95.1	24	198.0
24	16	Maja Vtič	Slovenia	116.5	101.6	22	118.0	94.2	25	195.8
25	25	Yuka Seto	Japan	117.5	97.5	25	116.0	97.1	22	194.6
26	21	Pauline Heßler	Germany	106.0	103.1	18	115.0	89.7	28	192.8
27	17	Ringo Miyajima	Japan	115.0	105.7	16	111.5	87.0	30	192.7
28	12	Julia Kykkänen	Finland	112.0	94.8	27	114.5	93.7	26	188.5
29	18	Jessica Malsiner	Italy	106.0	88.5	30	117.0	92.6	27	181.1
30	3	Klára Ulrichová	Czech Republic	108.5	91.1	29	112.0	85.6	29	176.7
31	8	Wang Liangyao	China	104.5	83.7	31	Did not advance			
32	13	Annika Belshaw	United States	108.0	83.5	32	Did not advance			
33	9	Sina Arnet	Switzerland	101.5	82.8	33	Did not advance			
34	10	Karolína Indráčková	Czech Republic	100.5	80.2	34	Did not advance			
35	7	Li Xueyao	China	98.0	79.6	35	Did not advance			
36	4	Samantha Macuga	United States	96.5	79.1	36	Did not advance			
36	5	Emely Torazza	Switzerland	98.0	79.1	36	Did not advance			
38	6	Nicole Konderla	Poland	102.5	78.4	38	Did not advance			
39	1	Zeng Ping	China	105.0	77.9	39	Did not advance			
40	24	Nika Prevc	Slovenia	103.5	72.2	40	Did not advance			
