= Ski jumping at the 2026 Winter Olympics – Mixed team =

Mixed team at the XXV Olympic Winter Games
- Ski jumping
- Venue: Predazzo Ski Jumping Stadium, Predazzo
- Date: 10 February 2026
- Winning points: 1069.2

Medalists
1st place, gold medalist(s)		Nika Vodan; Anže Lanišek; Nika Prevc; Domen Prevc	Slovenia
2nd place, silver medalist(s)		Anna Odine Strøm; Kristoffer Eriksen Sundal; Eirin Maria Kvandal; Marius Lindvik	Norway
3rd place, bronze medalist(s)		Nozomi Maruyama; Ryōyū Kobayashi; Sara Takanashi; Ren Nikaidō	Japan

The mixed team competition of the 2026 Winter Olympics was held on 10 February, at the Predazzo Ski Jumping Stadium in Predazzo. Slovenia, represented by Nika Vodan, Anže Lanišek, Nika Prevc, and Domen Prevc, won the event, thus defending their 2022 title (though Vodan was the only athlete from the 2022 team). Norway won the silver medal and Japan bronze.

== Background ==
The 2022 competition was unusual, because several top teams were disqualified. Slovenia were the champions, the Russian Olympic Committee won silver and Canada bronze. The Russian team was barred from participation in the 2026 Olympics after the Russian invasion of Ukraine. Canada did not participate. Before the Olympics, Slovenia were leading the mixed team standings of the 2025–26 FIS Ski Jumping World Cup, which held only two mixed team events; Japan won the November event while Slovenia won the January competition. Norway were the 2025 World champion in the mixed team competition.

== Schedule ==
=== Competition ===
GMT	Date	Event	Round	Country	Winner	Distance
17:30 AM	10 February 2026	Trial round	TR			
18:45 AM	10 February 2026	1st round	1R			
20:00 PM	10 February 2026	Final round	2R			

== Results ==
Rank	Bib	Country	Round 1			Final round			Total
Rank	Bib	Country	Distance (m)	Points	Rank	Distance (m)	Points	Rank	Points
1st place, gold medalist(s)	11; 11–1; 11–2; 11–3; 11–4	Slovenia; Nika Vodan; Anže Lanišek; Nika Prevc; Domen Prevc	100.0; 102.0; 97.5; 100.0	526.9; 121.5; 140.7; 125.7; 139.0	1	98.5; 101.0; 98.5; 102.0	542.3; 126.1; 142.0; 132.7; 141.5	1	1,069.2; 247.6; 282.7; 258.4; 280.5
2nd place, silver medalist(s)	8; 8–1; 8–2; 8–3; 8–4	Norway; Anna Odine Strøm; Kristoffer Eriksen Sundal; Eirin Maria Kvandal; Marius Lindvik	98.0; 104.0; 102.0; 97.5	510.8; 116.2; 136.4; 128.9; 129.3	3	101.0; 97.0; 99.5; 100.5	527.5; 132.1; 130.1; 131.4; 133.9	4	1,038.3; 248.3; 264.7; 260.3; 263.2
3rd place, bronze medalist(s)	12; 12–1; 12–2; 12–3; 12–4	Japan; Nozomi Maruyama; Ryōyū Kobayashi; Sara Takanashi; Ren Nikaidō	97.0; 100.5; 96.5; 103.0	517.2; 118.9; 133.3; 123.4; 141.6	2	97.5; 98.5; 97.0; 101.0	516.8; 122.8; 134.3; 125.6; 134.1	5	1,034.0; 241.7; 267.6; 249.0; 275.7
4	9; 9–1; 9–2; 9–3; 9–4	Germany; Agnes Reisch; Felix Hoffmann; Selina Freitag; Philipp Raimund	95.5; 100.5; 91.5; 98.0	502.1; 116.1; 136.3; 115.5; 134.2	4	96.0; 102.5; 98.5; 102.5	530.7; 122.0; 139.9; 127.9; 140.9	2	1,032.8; 238.1; 276.2; 243.4; 275.1
5	10; 10–1; 10–2; 10–3; 10–4	Austria; Lisa Eder; Jan Hörl; Julia Mühlbacher; Stephan Embacher	98.5; 102.5; 89.0; 100.0	497.6; 121.2; 134.7; 102.8; 138.9	5	98.5; 103.5; 94.5; 102.0	530.2; 127.7; 142.7; 119.0; 140.8	3	1,027.8; 248.9; 277.4; 221.8; 279.7
6	6; 6–1; 6–2; 6–3; 6–4	Finland; Heta Hirvonen; Vilho Palosaari; Jenny Rautionaho; Niko Kytösaho	88.0; 99.0; 95.0; 99.0	458.5; 94.6; 120.3; 111.8; 131.8	8	89.0; 100.5; 94.0; 97.5	479.5; 103.7; 129.9; 116.2; 129.7	6	938.0; 198.3; 250.2; 228.0; 261.5
7	5; 5–1; 5–2; 5–3; 5–4	United States; Annika Belshaw; Jason Colby; Paige Jones; Tate Frantz	92.0; 99.0; 92.5; 95.0	462.4; 108.0; 126.7; 102.9; 124.8	6	90.5; 101.0; 91.0; 95.5	470.5; 111.1; 129.3; 105.8; 124.3	7	932.9; 219.1; 256.0; 208.7; 249.1
8	4; 4–1; 4–2; 4–3; 4–4	China; Zeng Ping; Song Qiwu; Liu Qi; Zhao Jiawen	93.5; 99.0; 94.5; 91.5	460.5; 108.7; 124.1; 111.4; 116.3	7	98.5; 98.5; 90.5; 91.5	463.6; 122.9; 120.2; 108.2; 112.3	8	924.1; 231.6; 244.3; 219.6; 228.6
9	3; 3–1; 3–2; 3–3; 3–4	France; Emma Chervet; Enzo Milesi; Joséphine Pagnier; Valentin Foubert	86.0; 97.5; 90.5; 98.0	457.9; 99.1; 124.1; 102.6; 132.1	9	Did not advance			457.9; 99.1; 124.1; 102.6; 132.1
10	2; 2–1; 2–2; 2–3; 2–4	Italy; Annika Sieff; Alex Insam; Martina Zanitzer; Giovanni Bresadola	88.5; 97.5; 91.0; 95.5	451.5; 102.6; 124.3; 103.7; 120.9	10	Did not advance			451.5; 102.6; 124.3; 103.7; 120.9
11	7; 7–1; 7–2; 7–3; 7–4	Poland; Pola Bełtowska; Paweł Wąsek; Anna Twardosz; Kacper Tomasiak	82.0; 102.5; 92.0; 100.5	447.4; 75.5; 128.7; 106.7; 136.5	11	Did not advance			447.4; 75.5; 128.7; 106.7; 136.5
12	1; 1–1; 1–2; 1–3; 1–4	Romania; Delia Folea; Mihnea Spulber; Daniela Toth; Andrei Cacina	78.5; 84.5; 90.5; 93.5	393.1; 77.6; 96.5; 104.7; 114.3	12	Did not advance			393.1; 77.6; 96.5; 104.7; 114.3
Official results
