= FIS Nordic World Ski Championships 2021 – Women's individual normal hill =

Women's individual normal hill at the FIS Nordic World Ski Championships 2021
- Location: Oberstdorf, Germany
- Dates: 24 February (qualification); 25 February
- Competitors: 57 from 18 nations
- Winning points: 279.6

Medalists
gold medal	Ema Klinec	Slovenia
silver medal	Maren Lundby	Norway
bronze medal	Sara Takanashi	Japan

The Women's individual normal hill competition at the FIS Nordic World Ski Championships 2021 was held on 25 February. A qualification was held on 24 February 2021.

== Results ==
=== Qualification ===
The qualification was started on 24 February at 18:00.

Rank	Bib	Name	Country	Distance (m)	Points	Notes
1	56	Sara Takanashi	Japan	103.0	142.6	Q
2	54	Marita Kramer	Austria	101.5	140.1	Q
3	53	Ema Klinec	Slovenia	98.0	135.4	Q
4	42	Jerneja Brecl	Slovenia	102.0	135.0	Q
5	57	Nika Križnar	Slovenia	98.5	130.7	Q
6	52	Daniela Iraschko-Stolz	Austria	95.0	129.4	Q
7	41	Thea Minyan Bjørseth	Norway	101.0	129.0	Q
8	55	Silje Opseth	Norway	97.0	128.8	Q
9	47	Sophie Sorschag	Austria	98.5	127.2	Q
10	45	Yūki Itō	Japan	99.0	126.5	Q
11	51	Maren Lundby	Norway	91.0	125.8	Q
12	50	Irina Avvakumova	Russian Ski Federation	93.5	124.2	Q
13	39	Lara Malsiner	Italy	98.0	122.7	Q
14	37	Jessica Malsiner	Italy	96.5	122.4	Q
15	43	Anna Rupprecht	Germany	96.5	119.9	Q
16	44	Julia Clair	France	95.5	117.8	Q
17	40	Anna Odine Strøm	Norway	95.5	117.5	Q
18	48	Urša Bogataj	Slovenia	91.5	117.3	Q
19	49	Katharina Althaus	Germany	90.0	114.3	Q
20	46	Nozomi Maruyama	Japan	93.5	113.2	Q
21	38	Eva Pinkelnig	Austria	93.0	111.8	Q
22	26	Kristina Prokopieva	Russian Ski Federation	89.0	107.6	Q
23	33	Irma Makhinia	Russian Ski Federation	90.0	105.9	Q
24	25	Jenny Rautionaho	Finland	89.0	105.4	Q
25	24	Anna Twardosz	Poland	87.5	105.0	Q
26	29	Yūka Setō	Japan	88.0	104.8	Q
27	27	Daniela Haralambie	Romania	88.5	102.8	Q
28	34	Sofia Tikhonova	Russian Ski Federation	88.0	102.7	Q
29	28	Juliane Seyfarth	Germany	86.0	102.6	Q
30	30	Karolína Indráčková	Czech Republic	86.0	98.9	Q
31	32	Julia Kykkänen	Finland	85.5	98.7	Q
32	35	Carina Vogt	Germany	84.5	97.0	Q
33	36	Joséphine Pagnier	France	85.0	96.4	Q
34	18	Abigail Strate	Canada	82.0	94.5	Q
35	3	Frida Westman	Sweden	83.0	91.6	Q
36	1	Susanna Forsström	Finland	78.5	83.8	Q
37	7	Annika Belshaw	United States	77.0	81.4	Q
38	20	Paige Jones	United States	73.5	74.9	Q
39	22	Kinga Rajda	Poland	74.5	73.1	Q
40	5	Natalie Eilers	Canada	75.0	72.4	Q
41	11	Virág Vörös	Hungary	73.5	72.1	
42	23	Kamila Karpiel	Poland	72.0	67.9	
42	4	Štěpánka Ptáčková	Czech Republic	71.5	67.9	
44	12	Anna Hoffmann	United States	70.0	67.0	
45	17	Julia Tervahartiala	Finland	71.5	66.9	
46	2	Alexandria Loutitt	Canada	71.0	66.1	
47	8	Nicole Konderla	Poland	70.0	65.7	
48	31	Klára Ulrichová	Czech Republic	73.0	65.5	
48	9	Logan Sankey	United States	73.0	65.5	
50	10	Veronika Jenčová	Czech Republic	71.0	63.6	
51	14	Natasha Bodnarchuk	Canada	71.0	62.6	
52	13	Andreea Trâmbițaș	Romania	62.5	50.9	
53	21	Delia Folea	Romania	62.5	48.3	
54	16	Astrid Norstedt	Sweden	64.5	48.1	
55	15	Dayana Pekha	Kazakhstan	60.5	40.5	
56	19	Tetiana Pylypchuk	Ukraine	59.5	40.1	
57	6	Alessia Mitu Coşca	Romania	58.5	38.1	

=== Final ===
The first round was started on 25 February at 17:00 and the final round at 17:55.

Rank	Bib	Name	Country	Round 1			Final round			Total
Rank	Bib	Name	Country	Distance (m)	Points	Rank	Distance (m)	Points	Rank	Points
1st place, gold medalist(s)	36	Ema Klinec	Slovenia	105.0	141.7	2	100.5	137.9	2	279.6
2nd place, silver medalist(s)	34	Maren Lundby	Norway	102.5	138.1	4	99.5	138.4	1	276.5
3rd place, bronze medalist(s)	39	Sara Takanashi	Japan	104.0	140.5	3	100.0	135.8	3	276.3
4	37	Marita Kramer	Austria	109.0	142.7	1	98.0	132.5	4	275.2
5	40	Nika Križnar	Slovenia	95.0	125.8	6	97.0	131.7	6	257.5
6	38	Silje Opseth	Norway	93.0	122.8	7	98.0	132.3	5	255.1
7	24	Thea Minyan Bjørseth	Norway	99.5	129.0	5	92.0	123.7	12	252.7
8	35	Daniela Iraschko-Stolz	Austria	95.5	121.5	8	95.0	126.5	8	248.0
9	25	Jerneja Brecl	Slovenia	95.5	121.5	8	94.5	123.1	13	244.6
10	32	Katharina Althaus	Germany	91.0	111.6	14	98.0	130.2	7	241.8
11	28	Yūki Itō	Japan	93.5	116.3	10	95.0	125.4	9	241.7
12	33	Irina Avvakumova	Russian Ski Federation	92.5	113.9	13	95.5	125.0	11	238.9
13	31	Urša Bogataj	Slovenia	96.0	114.5	12	94.0	121.4	14	235.9
14	26	Anna Rupprecht	Germany	93.0	115.1	11	91.5	118.6	16	233.7
15	20	Jessica Malsiner	Italy	89.5	108.9	17	93.5	120.4	15	229.3
16	19	Joséphine Pagnier	France	88.0	109.8	16	92.5	118.2	17	228.0
17	27	Julia Clair	France	86.5	100.3	21	97.5	125.1	10	225.4
18	22	Lara Malsiner	Italy	90.0	108.7	18	93.0	113.6	18	222.3
19	23	Anna Odine Strøm	Norway	92.0	110.8	15	89.5	109.8	21	220.6
20	29	Nozomi Maruyama	Japan	91.0	107.4	19	90.0	110.1	20	217.5
21	12	Juliane Seyfarth	Germany	86.0	98.9	22	93.0	112.0	19	210.9
22	13	Yūka Setō	Japan	91.0	104.4	20	88.0	99.1	26	203.5
23	16	Irma Makhinia	Russian Ski Federation	84.5	98.4	23	90.0	101.8	24	200.2
24	17	Sofia Tikhonova	Russian Ski Federation	82.5	93.6	26	88.0	104.3	22	197.9
25	14	Karolína Indráčková	Czech Republic	85.0	96.0	24	88.5	101.8	24	197.8
26	11	Daniela Haralambie	Romania	84.0	95.8	25	84.5	98.1	27	193.9
27	5	Abigail Strate	Canada	80.0	89.6	29	86.0	102.2	23	191.8
28	10	Kristina Prokopieva	Russian Ski Federation	84.0	89.7	28	84.0	95.3	28	185.0
29	15	Julia Kykkänen	Finland	81.5	89.8	27	81.5	91.0	29	180.8
30	18	Carina Vogt	Germany	81.0	87.7	30	70.0	61.0	30	148.7
31	9	Jenny Rautionaho	Finland	83.5	87.4	31	Did not qualify			
32	21	Eva Pinkelnig	Austria	81.0	86.9	32	Did not qualify			
33	8	Anna Twardosz	Poland	83.0	83.4	33	Did not qualify			
34	1	Susanna Forsström	Finland	76.0	75.4	34	Did not qualify			
35	2	Frida Westman	Sweden	76.5	75.1	35	Did not qualify			
36	6	Paige Jones	United States	69.5	70.3	36	Did not qualify			
37	4	Annika Belshaw	United States	73.5	69.6	37	Did not qualify			
38	7	Kinga Rajda	Poland	69.5	66.9	38	Did not qualify			
39	3	Natalie Eilers	Canada	72.5	64.4	39	Did not qualify			
	30	Sophie Sorschag	Austria	Disqualified						
