= Ski jumping at the 2016 Winter Youth Olympics – Mixed team normal hill =

Mixed team normal hill at the II Winter Youth Olympic Games
- Venue: Lysgårdsbakkene Ski Jumping Arena
- Date: 18 February
- Competitors: 33 from 11 nations
- Winning points: 709.5

Medalists
1st place, gold medalist(s)		Ema Klinec; Vid Vrhovnik; Bor Pavlovčič	Slovenia
2nd place, silver medalist(s)		Agnes Reisch; Tim Kopp; Jonathan Siegel	Germany
3rd place, bronze medalist(s)		Julia Huber; Florian Dagn; Clemens Leitner	Austria

The mixed team competition of the ski jumping events at the 2016 Winter Youth Olympics was held on 18 February at the Lysgårdsbakkene Ski Jumping Arena. Each of the 11 teams consists of a female ski jumper, a male Nordic Combined skier and a male ski jumper.

== Results ==
The first round was started at 11:00 and the final round at 12:15.

Rank	Bib	Country	Round 1			Final round			Total
Rank	Bib	Country	Distance (m)	Points	Rank	Distance (m)	Points	Rank	Points
1st place, gold medalist(s)	4	Slovenia; Ema Klinec; Vid Vrhovnik; Bor Pavlovčič	96.0; 92.5; 94.5	359.5; 120.1; 114.0; 125.4	1	90.5; 95.5; 98.0	350.0; 109.1; 117.8; 123.1	1	709.5
2nd place, silver medalist(s)	5	Germany; Agnes Reisch; Tim Kopp; Jonathan Siegel	84.5; 94.5; 91	334.5; 97.1; 122.4; 115.0	3	84.5; 97.0; 97.5	341.0; 94.6; 122.8; 123.6	2	675.5
3rd place, bronze medalist(s)	10	Austria; Julia Huber; Florian Dagn; Clemens Leitner	79.0; 96.5; 99.0	340.0; 85.1; 125.4; 129.5	2	87.5; 98.0; 91.5	326.7; 95.4; 122.8; 108.5	3	666.7
4	9	Russia; Sofia Tikhonova; Vitalii Ivanov; Maksim Sergeev	91.0; 93.5; 88.0	328.2; 109.6; 114.2; 104.4	4	92.0; 93.5; 90.0	324.8; 108.8; 110.3; 105.7	4	653.0
5	1	France; Romane Dieu; Lilian Vaxelaire; Jonathan Learoyd	86.0; 92.0; 90.5	318.6; 94.8; 111.7; 112.1	5	79.5; 91.5; 95.5	304.8; 75.8; 111.1; 117.9	5	623.4
6	8	Norway; Anna Odine Strøm; Einar Lurås Oftebro; Marius Lindvik	81.5; 86.0; 97.0	309.4; 89.2; 96.9; 123.3	6	80.0; 87.0; 95.5	300.5; 83.9; 98.4; 118.2	6	609.9
7	6	Czech Republic; Zdeňka Pešatová; Ondřej Pažout; František Holík	77.0; 92.5; 89.5	306.2; 79.9; 116.6; 109.7	7	82.5; 99.0; 77.0	284.5; 87.3; 124.2; 73.0	9	590.7
8	3	Japan; Shihori Oi; Yoshihiro Kimura; Masamitsu Itō	77.5; 88.5; 89.0	288.5; 75.6; 103.4; 109.5	8	70.0; 92.0; 93.0	290.2; 64.2; 111.1; 114.9	8	578.7
9	11	Poland; Kinga Rajda; Paweł Twardosz; Dawid Jarząbek	76.0; 89.5; 88.5	282.9; 76.3; 107.2; 99.4	9	85.0; 89.0; 86.5	291.5; 88.0; 103.5; 100.0	7	574.4
10	7	United States; Logan Sankey; Ben Loomis; Casey Larson	70.0; 86.0; 92.5	273.8; 62.1; 102.0; 109.7	10	67.5; 87.0; 89.0	257.8; 53.4; 101.9; 102.5	11	531.6
11	2	Italy; Lara Malsiner; Aaron Kostner; Alessio Longo	94.5; 89.5; DSQ	219.7; 113.5; 106.2; 0.0	11	85.0; 93.5; 70.5	259.3; 92.7; 110.7; 55.9	10	479.0
