= Slovenia at the 2016 Winter Youth Olympics =

- IOC code: SLO
- NOC: Slovenian Olympic Committee
- Website: www.olympic.si

in Lillehammer
- Competitors: 20 in 7 sports
- Medals Ranked 10th: Gold 3 Silver 0 Bronze 2 Total 5

Winter Youth Olympics appearances
- 2012; 2016; 2020; 2024

Slovenia competed at the 2016 Winter Youth Olympics in Lillehammer, Norway from 12 to 21 February 2016.

== Medalists ==
Medal	Name	Sport	Event	Date
Gold	Ema Klinec	Ski jumping	Girls' normal hill	16 February
Gold	Bor Pavlovčič	Ski jumping	Boys' normal hill	16 February
Gold	Ema Klinec; Vid Vrhovnik; Bor Pavlovčič	Ski jumping	Team competition	18 February
Bronze	Tit Štante	Snowboarding	Boys' halfpipe	14 February
Bronze	Meta Hrovat	Alpine skiing	Girls' slalom	18 February

== Alpine skiing ==
Boys

Athlete	Event	Run 1		Run 2		Total	
Athlete	Event	Time	Rank	Time	Rank	Time	Rank
Anže Čufar	Slalom	50.91	7	did not finish			
Anže Čufar	Giant slalom	1:22.42	27	1:20.93	20	2:43.35	23
Anže Čufar	Super-G	—N/a				1:16.17	40
Anže Čufar	Combined	1:14.51	28	42.94	16	1:57.45	19
Nejc Naraločnik	Slalom	51.04	9	did not finish			
Nejc Naraločnik	Giant slalom	DNF		did not advance			
Nejc Naraločnik	Super-G	—N/a				1:13.02	22
Nejc Naraločnik	Combined	1:12.98	8	did not finish			

Girls

Athlete	Event	Run 1		Run 2		Total	
Athlete	Event	Time	Rank	Time	Rank	Time	Rank
Meta Hrovat	Slalom	54.99	4	50.87	3	1:45.86	3rd place, bronze medalist(s)
Meta Hrovat	Giant slalom	1:18.68	4	1:15.55	5	2:34.23	4
Meta Hrovat	Super-G	—N/a				DNF	
Meta Hrovat	Combined	DNF		did not advance			
Živa Otoničar	Slalom	58.86	19	53.95	18	1:52.81	17
Živa Otoničar	Giant slalom	DNF		did not advance			
Živa Otoničar	Super-G	—N/a				1:18.18	27
Živa Otoničar	Combined	1:19.95	28	45.40	16	2:05.35	19

Parallel mixed team

Athletes	Event	Round of 16	Quarterfinals	Semifinals	Final / BM	
Athletes	Event	Opposition Score	Opposition Score	Opposition Score	Opposition Score	Rank
Meta Hrovat; Anže Čufar	Parallel mixed team	Croatia; W 2^{+} – 2	Russia; L 2 – 2^{+}	did not advance		

== Biathlon ==
Boys

Athlete	Event	Time	Misses	Rank
Blaž Debeljak	Sprint	22:55.7	7	44
Blaž Debeljak	Pursuit	35:59.7	6	42
Klemen Vampelj	Sprint	22:55.9	4	45
Klemen Vampelj	Pursuit	36:22.6	5	44

Girls

Athlete	Event	Time	Misses	Rank
Tais Vozelj	Sprint	19:56.5	2	21
Tais Vozelj	Pursuit	27:35.5	4	18

Mixed

Athletes	Event	Time	Misses	Rank
Tais Vozelj; Blaž Debeljak	Single mixed relay	47:42.6	8+21	24

== Cross-country skiing ==
Boys

Athlete	Event	Qualification		Quarterfinal		Semifinal		Final	
Athlete	Event	Time	Rank	Time	Rank	Time	Rank	Time	Rank
Vili Črv	10 km freestyle	—N/a						26:23.3	30
Vili Črv	Classical sprint	3:03.55	7 Q	3:02.25	2 Q	3:00.06	5	did not advance	
Vili Črv	Cross-country cross	3:11.46	8 Q	—N/a		3:12.13	4	did not advance	
Luka Markun	10 km freestyle	—N/a						25:34.2	16
Luka Markun	Classical sprint	3:07.38	13 Q	3:10.42	5	did not advance			
Luka Markun	Cross-country cross	3:17.46	25 Q	—N/a		3:14.01	10	did not advance	

Girls

Athlete	Event	Qualification		Quarterfinal		Semifinal		Final	
Athlete	Event	Time	Rank	Time	Rank	Time	Rank	Time	Rank
Nina Klemenčič	5 km freestyle	—N/a						15:26.7	33
Nina Klemenčič	Classical sprint	3:35.61	9 Q	3:51.54	6	did not advance			
Nina Klemenčič	Cross-country cross	3:53.82	24 Q	—N/a		3:54.43	8	did not advance	
Anja Mandeljc	5 km freestyle	—N/a						13:40.4	6
Anja Mandeljc	Classical sprint	3:31.82	3 Q	3:29.16	3 q	3:30.63	5	did not advance	
Anja Mandeljc	Cross-country cross	3:48.72	18 Q	—N/a		3:40.69	6	did not advance	

== Freestyle skiing ==
Halfpipe

Athlete	Event	Final				
Athlete	Event	Run 1	Run 2	Run 3	Best	Rank
Maksimiljan Blažon	Boys' halfpipe	32.40	32.40	34.00	34.00	11

Ski cross

Athlete	Event	Qualification		Group heats		Semifinal	Final
Athlete	Event	Time	Rank	Points	Rank	Position	Position
Luka Štros	Boys' ski cross	47.38	17	did not advance			

Slopestyle

Athlete	Event	Final			
Athlete	Event	Run 1	Run 2	Best	Rank
Maksimilijan Blažon	Boys' slopestyle	50.20	47.80	50.20	16

== Nordic combined ==
Individual

Athlete	Event	Ski jumping				Cross-country	
Athlete	Event	Distance	Points	Rank	Deficit	Time	Rank
Vid Vrhovnik	Normal hill/5 km	92.5	118.8	5	0:52	14:22.2	5

Nordic mixed team

Athlete	Event	Ski jumping			Cross-country	
Athlete	Event	Points	Rank	Deficit	Time	Rank
Ema Klinec; Vid Vrhovnik; Bor Pavlovčič; Anja Mandeljc; Vili Črv	Nordic mixed team	375.7	1	0:00	26:38.5	4

== Ski jumping ==
Individual

Athlete	Event	First round			Final			Total	
Athlete	Event	Distance	Points	Rank	Distance	Points	Rank	Points	Rank
Bor Pavlovčič	Boys' normal hill	101.0	130.9	1	99.0	131.9	1	262.8	1st place, gold medalist(s)
Ema Klinec	Girls' normal hill	95.0	124.5	1	96.0	124.8	1	249.3	1st place, gold medalist(s)

Team

Athlete	Event	First round		Final		Total	
Athlete	Event	Points	Rank	Points	Rank	Points	Rank
Ema Klinec; Vid Vrhovnik; Bor Pavlovčič	Team competition	350.0	1	359.5	1	709.5	1st place, gold medalist(s)

== Snowboarding ==
Halfpipe

Athlete	Event	Final				
Athlete	Event	Run 1	Run 2	Run 3	Best	Rank
Tit Štante	Boys' halfpipe	75.50	71.50	80.25	80.25	3rd place, bronze medalist(s)
Eva Kralj	Girls' halfpipe	40.00	15.00	25.25	40.00	12
Kaja Verdnik	Girls' halfpipe	50.75	47.00	52.50	52.50	10

Snowboard cross

Athlete	Event	Qualification		Group heats		Semifinal	Final
Athlete	Event	Time	Rank	Points	Rank	Position	Position
Tit Štante	Boys' snowboard cross	50.64	13 Q	6	15	did not advance	

Slopestyle

Athlete	Event	Final			
Athlete	Event	Run 1	Run 2	Best	Rank
Tit Štante	Boys' slopestyle	58.00	71.50	71.50	10
Eva Kralj	Girls' slopestyle	12.00	19.50	19.50	17
Kaja Verdnik	Girls' slopestyle	34.75	26.50	34.75	15

== See also ==
- Slovenia at the 2016 Summer Olympics
