= Ski jumping at the 2016 Winter Youth Olympics – Girls' individual normal hill =

Girls' individual at the II Winter Youth Olympic Games
- Venue: Lysgårdsbakkene Ski Jumping Arena
- Dates: 16 February
- Competitors: 13 from 13 nations
- Points: 249.3

Medalists
1st place, gold medalist(s)		Ema Klinec	Slovenia
2nd place, silver medalist(s)		Sofia Tikhonova	Russia
3rd place, bronze medalist(s)		Lara Malsiner	Italy

The girls' ski jumping event at the 2016 Winter Youth Olympics was held on 16 February at the Lysgårdsbakkene Ski Jumping Arena.

== Results ==
Rank	Bib	Name	Country	Round 1			Final round			Total
Rank	Bib	Name	Country	Distance (m)	Points	Rank	Distance (m)	Points	Rank	Points
1st place, gold medalist(s)	1	Ema Klinec	Slovenia	95.0	124.5	1	96.0	124.8	1	249.3
2nd place, silver medalist(s)	4	Sofia Tikhonova	Russia	97.0	123.0	2	92.5	114.6	3	237.6
3rd place, bronze medalist(s)	9	Lara Malsiner	Italy	95.5	116.3	3	94.5	115.3	2	231.6
4	6	Agnes Reisch	Germany	93.0	112.2	4	92.0	107.2	4	219.4
5	12	Julia Huber	Austria	89.5	104.8	5	88.0	99.9	5	204.7
6	8	Anna Odine Strøm	Norway	84.0	94.0	7	86.5	98.4	6	192.4
7	11	Kinga Rajda	Poland	83.5	90.3	8	84.5	91.4	7	181.7
8	5	Romane Dieu	France	83.5	88.5	10	81.5	88.9	8	177.4
9	13	Andreea Diana Trâmbițaș	Romania	83.0	88.8	9	82.0	88.1	9	176.9
10	3	Zdeňka Pešatová	Czech Republic	85.0	94.7	6	80.0	82.0	10	176.7
11	2	Shihori Oi	Japan	73.0	72.3	11	72.5	71.3	11	143.6
12	7	Logan Sankey	United States	74.0	65.8	12	69.0	58.7	12	124.5
13	10	Virág Vörös	Hungary	62.5	44.2	13	62.5	45.3	13	89.5
