= Ski jumping at the 2016 Winter Youth Olympics =

Ski Jumping at the II Winter Youth Olympic Games
- Venue: Lysgårdsbakkene Ski Jumping Arena; Lillehammer, Norway
- Dates: 16–18 February
- Competitors: 45 Quota limit

Ski jumping at the 2016 Winter Youth Olympics was held at the Lysgårdsbakken in Lillehammer, Norway from 16 to 18 February.

== Medal summary ==
=== Medal table ===
* Host nation (Norway)

Rank	Nation	Gold	Silver	Bronze	Total
1	Slovenia	3	0	0	3
2	Germany	0	1	1	2
3	Norway*	0	1	0	1
3	Russia	0	1	0	1
5	Austria	0	0	1	1
5	Italy	0	0	1	1
Totals (6 entries)		3	3	3	9

=== Events ===
Event	Gold		Silver		Bronze	
Boys' individual	Bor Pavlovčič; Slovenia	262.8	Marius Lindvik; Norway	251.0	Jonathan Siegel; Germany	236.0
Girls' individual	Ema Klinec; Slovenia	249.3	Sofia Tikhonova; Russia	237.6	Lara Malsiner; Italy	231.6
Team competition	Slovenia; Ema Klinec; Bor Pavlovčič; Vid Vrhovnik	709.5	Germany; Agnes Reisch; Tim Kopp; Jonathan Siegel	675.5	Austria; Julia Huber; Florian Dagn; Clemens Leitner	666.7

== Qualification ==
Each nation could send a maximum of 2 athletes (1 boy and 1 girl). The top scoring teams of the Marc Hodler Trophy Ski Jumping at the 2015 Junior Nordic World Ski Championships plus the hosts Norway were allowed to send the maximum of 2 athletes. Any remaining quota spots were distributed to nations not already qualified, with a maximum of one boy or girl from one nation. The quota limit was 45. The allocation of quotas is listed below.

=== Qualification summary ===
NOC	Boys	Girls	Total
Austria	1	1	2
Czech Republic	1	1	2
Estonia	1		1
Finland	1		1
France	1	1	2
Germany	1	1	2
Hungary	1	1	2
Italy	1	1	2
Japan	1	1	2
Kazakhstan	1		1
Norway	1	1	2
Poland	1	1	2
Romania	1	1	2
Russia	1	1	2
Slovenia	1	1	2
Switzerland	1		1
Turkey	1		1
Ukraine	1		1
United States	1	1	2
Total athletes	19	13	32
Total NOCs	19	13	19
