= Alexandria Loutitt =

Canadian ski jumper (born 2004)

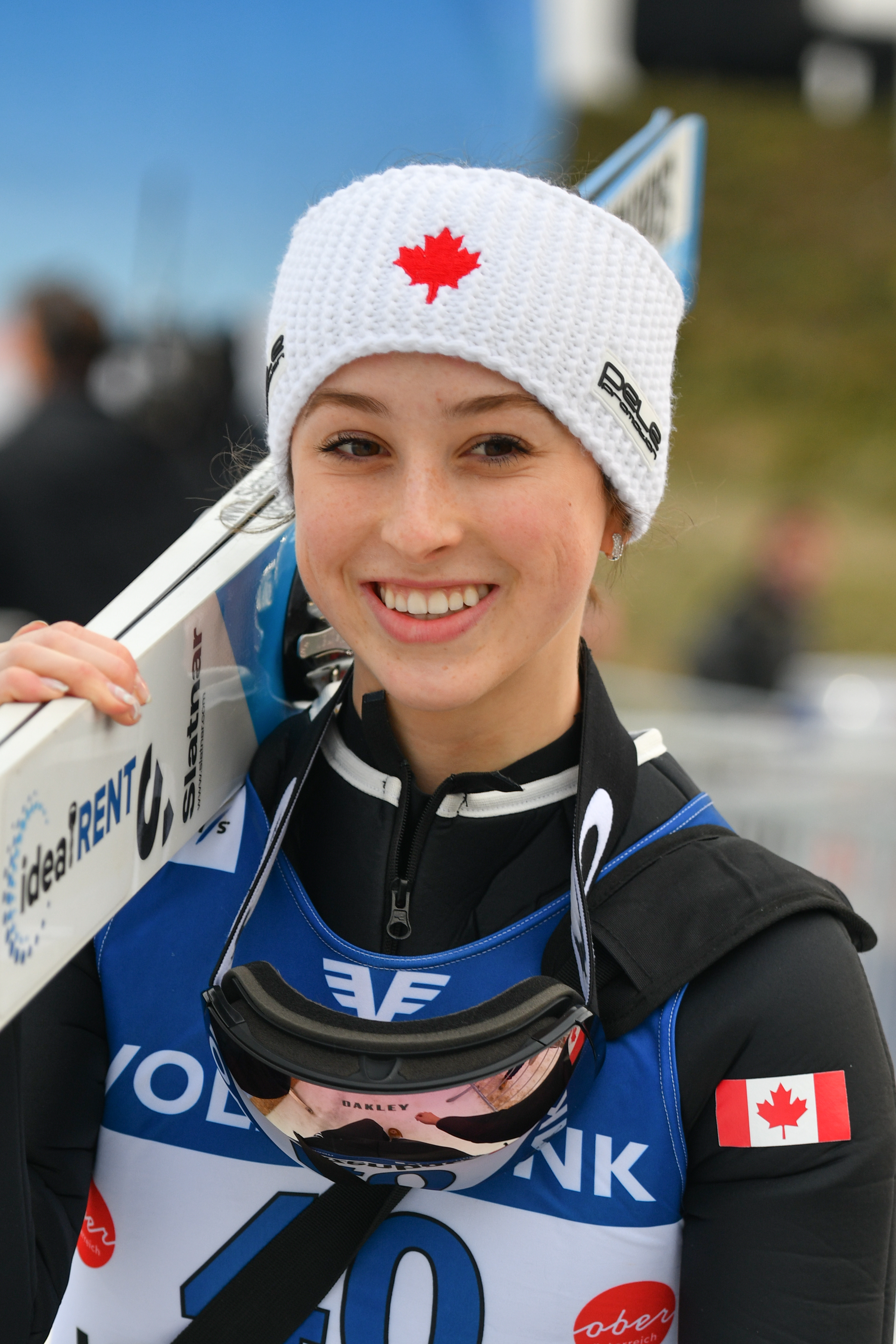
- Loutitt in Hinzenbach, 2023

Personal information
- Born: 7 January 2004 (age 22) Calgary, Alberta, Canada
- Height: 164 cm (5 ft 5 in)

Sport
- Sport: Ski jumping
- Club: Altius Nordic Ski Club

World Cup career
- Seasons: 2021–present
- Indiv. starts: 68
- Indiv. podiums: 11
- Indiv. wins: 2
- Team starts: 7
- Team podiums: 1

Achievements and titles
- Personal bests: 225 m (738 ft); Vikersund, 19 March 2023
Medal record
Representing Canada
Women's ski jumping
Winter Olympics
Bronze medal – third place	2022 Beijing	Mixed team
World Championships
Gold medal – first place	2023 Planica	Individual LH
World Junior Championships
Gold medal – first place	2023 Whistler	Individual NH
Bronze medal – third place	2022 Zakopane	Individual NH
- Updated on 22 November 2026

Alexandria Loutitt (born 7 January 2004) is a Canadian ski jumper. She is the first ski jumper from Canada to win a gold medal at the World Championships and the first Canadian woman to win a World Cup individual competition.

Loutitt trains in Slovenia, as the ski jumping facility at the Canada Olympic Park in Calgary was shut down.

== Career ==
Loutitt became captivated with ski jumping while watching the 2010 Vancouver Winter Olympics. She attended the National Sports School in Calgary, Alberta, which allowed her to spend several months a year in Garmisch-Partenkirchen, Germany for training as a teenager before joining the Canadian national team.

Loutitt competed in four events at the FIS Nordic World Ski Championships 2021, finishing 46th on the normal hill, 38th on the large hill, 11th on the women's team normal hill and 10th in the mixed team normal hill. In December 2021, Loutitt had her season's best performance on the World Cup circuit with a 14th-place finish in the large hill event in Lillehammer.

In January 2022, Loutitt was named to Canada's 2022 Olympic team. On 7 February, Loutitt won the bronze medal as part of Canada's entry into the mixed team competition. This was Canada's first ever Olympic medal in ski jumping. In March 2022, Loutitt would win the bronze medal at the 2022 Nordic Junior World Ski Championships in the women's normal hill event.

In January 2023, Loutitt won the normal hill event at the World Cup stop in Zaō, Japan. This marked the first ever victory for a Canadian woman in the competition. The next month, she also became the first Canadian woman to win a world junior title in ski jumping, taking the individual normal hill gold in front of home fans in Whistler, British Columbia. In March, Loutitt became the first-ever Canadian ski jumping world champion, winning the women's large hill event at the FIS Nordic World Ski Championships 2023 in Planica, Slovenia.

On 18 March 2023, in the first ever women's ski flying event in Vikersund, Loutitt set a new female world record with 222 metres (728 ft). Her record was surpassed the next day by Ema Klinec.

== Personal life ==
Loutitt is of Gwichʼin descent. She is in a relationship with fellow ski jumper Daniel Tschofenig.

== Major tournament results ==
=== Winter Olympics ===
Year	Normal hill	Mixed team
2022	DSQ	3

=== FIS Nordic World Ski Championships ===
Year	Normal hill	Large hill	Team	Mixed team
2021	q	38	11	10
2023	26	1	6	—
2025	5	10	—	—

== World Cup results ==
=== Overall standings ===
Season	Position	Points
2020–21	—	0
2021–22	32	94
2022–23	13	547
2023–24	3	1,030
2024–25	10	681
2025–26	—	0

=== Individual wins ===
No.	Season	Date	Location	Hill	Size
1	2022–23	13 January 2023	(Japan) Zaō	Yamagata HS100	NH
2	2024–25	18 January 2025	(Japan) Sapporo	Ōkurayama HS134	LH

=== Individual starts ===
winner (1); second (2); third (3); did not compete (–); failed to qualify (q); disqualified (DQ)
Season	1	2	3	4	5	6	7	8	9	10	11	12	13	14	15	16	17	18	19	20	21	22	23	24	25	26
2020–21
2020–21	–	–	–	–	–	–	–	–	–	q	q	q	–
2021–22
2021–22	q	34	DQ	14	q	q	37	19	24	–	–	21	30	–	–	–	–	12	11
2022–23
2022–23	–	–	–	–	–	4	9	24	4	10	8	1	15	–	–	–	–	5	10	–	–	7	10	23	2	15
2023–24
2023–24	3	2	2	8	16	6	40	7	–	4	3	3	4	4	19	5	6	14	4	5	4	5	8	2
2024–25	Lillehammer	Lillehammer	Zhangjiakou	Zhangjiakou	Engelberg	Garmisch-Partenkirchen	Oberstdorf	Villach	Villach	Sapporo	Sapporo	Zaō Onsen	Zaō Onsen	Willingen	Lake Placid, New York	Lake Placid, New York	Ljubno ob Savinji	Ljubno ob Savinji	Hinzenbach	Hinzenbach	Oslo	Vikersund	Lahti	Lahti
2024–25	8	10	12	8	5	13	14	9	24	1	12	8	4	–	3	10	–	–	–	–	6	5	3	16
