= FIS Nordic World Ski Championships 2025 – Mixed team large hill =

Mixed team large hill at the FIS Nordic World Ski Championships 2025
- Venue: Granåsen Ski Centre
- Location: Trondheim, Norway
- Dates: 5 March

Medalists
gold medal	Anna Odine Strøm; Marius Lindvik; Eirin Maria Kvandal; Johann André Forfang	Norway
silver medal	Ema Klinec; Domen Prevc; Nika Prevc; Anže Lanišek	Slovenia
bronze medal	Eva Pinkelnig; Stefan Kraft; Jacqueline Seifriedsberger; Jan Hörl	Austria

The Mixed team large hill competition at the FIS Nordic World Ski Championships 2025 was held on 5 March 2025.

== Results ==
The first round was started at 16:00 and the final round at 17:10.

Rank	Bib	Country	Round 1			Final round			Total
Rank	Bib	Country	Distance (m)	Points	Rank	Distance (m)	Points	Rank	Points
1st place, gold medalist(s)	13	Norway; Anna Odine Strøm; Marius Lindvik; Eirin Maria Kvandal; Johann André Forfang	121.5; 135.0; 128.0; 134.5	497.7; 108.3; 139.7; 112.5; 137.2	1	132.0; 132.5; 131.5; 135.5	522.7; 124.6; 131.1; 124.8; 142.2	1	1020.4
2nd place, silver medalist(s)	12	Slovenia; Ema Klinec; Domen Prevc; Nika Prevc; Anže Lanišek	104.5; 130.5; 133.5; 134.0	465.2; 72.4; 128.8; 128.5; 135.5	2	103.0; 138.5; 136.0; 141.0	494.1; 67.8; 141.1; 139.2; 146.0	2	959.3
3rd place, bronze medalist(s)	15	Austria; Eva Pinkelnig; Stefan Kraft; Jacqueline Seifriedsberger; Jan Hörl	110.0; 130.5; 117.0; 134.0	443.6; 81.4; 130.1; 96.2; 135.9	3	114.5; 132.5; 117.5; 139.0	463.2; 91.6; 127.5; 104.0; 140.1	4	906.8
4	14	Germany; Katharina Schmid; Philipp Raimund; Selina Freitag; Andreas Wellinger	111.5; 125.0; 123.0; 125.5	430.8; 89.7; 117.7; 100.5; 122.9	4	109.0; 138.0; 120.5; 139.0	468/2; 80.5; 139.1; 106.1; 142.5	3	899.0
5	11	Japan; Yuki Ito; Ren Nikaido; Sara Takanashi; Ryōyū Kobayashi	106.0; 123.0; 108.0; 135.5	394.2; 73.7; 109.8; 75.0; 135.7	5	107.5; 117.0; 103.0; 134.0	391.6; 78.7; 101.0; 76.1; 135.8	5	785.8
6	8	United States; Paige Jones; Kevin Bickner; Annika Belshaw; Tate Frantz	104.0; 121.5; 107.5; 127.0	370.7; 67.7; 110.7; 71.4; 120.9	6	101.5; 122.5; 103.5; 129.0	368.4; 63.9; 111.1; 69.9; 123.5	6	739.1
7	7	Finland; Julia Kykkänen; Kasperi Valto; Jenny Rautionaho; Antti Aalto	91.0; 118.0; 96.5; 126.5	306.6; 44.2; 101.0; 50.8; 110.6	8	96.0; 122.0; 100.0; 127.0	349.4; 54.6; 107.5; 67.6; 119.7	7	656.0
8	10	Poland; Pola Bełtowska; Dawid Kubacki; Anna Twardosz; Aleksander Zniszczoł	83.0; 119.5; 105.5; 118.0	308.1; 30.5; 101.9; 70.6; 105.1	7	89.5; 122.5; 100.0; 123.0	328.8; 42.2; 110.8; 63.6; 112.2	8	636.9
	6	Italy; Annika Sieff; Francesco Cecon; Lara Malsiner; Alex Insam	97.5; 104.5; 97.0; 117.5	283.3; 62.0; 69.2; 55.9; 96.2	9	Did not advance			
	5	France; Emma Chervet; Enzo Milesi; Joséphine Pagnier; Valentin Foubert	89.5; 113.5; 92.0; 116.0	283.3; 42.9; 94.4; 49.9; 96.1	9	Did not advance			
	9	Switzerland; Sina Arnet; Killian Peier; Rea Kindlimann; Gregor Deschwanden	77.0; 117.0; 82.0; 128.0	258.9; 16.9; 98.9; 20.2; 122.9	11	Did not advance			
	4	China; Weng Yangning; Zhen Weijie; Liu Qi; Song Qiwu	85.0; 94.5; 102.0; 114.5	231.3; 27.7; 51.2; 62.5; 89.9	12	Did not advance			
	1	Czech Republic; Klára Ulrichová; Daniel Ŝkarka; Karolína Indráčková; Roman Koudelka	86.0; 101.5; 88.0; 102.5	202.2; 34.6; 60.0; 33.0; 74.6	13	Did not advance			
	3	Ukraine; Tetiana Pylypchuk; Vitaliy Kalinichenko; Zhanna Hlukhova; Yevhen Marusiak	60.0; 110.5; 86.5; 112.5	198.7; 0.0; 83.3; 30.0; 85.4	14	Did not advance			
	2	Kazakhstan; Veronika Shishkina; Ilya Mizernykh; Alyona Sviridenko; Danil Vassilyev	58.0; 102.5; 73.0; 103.0	138.7; 0.0; 63.8; 7.1; 67.8	15	Did not advance			
