= Selina Freitag =

German ski jumper (born 2001)

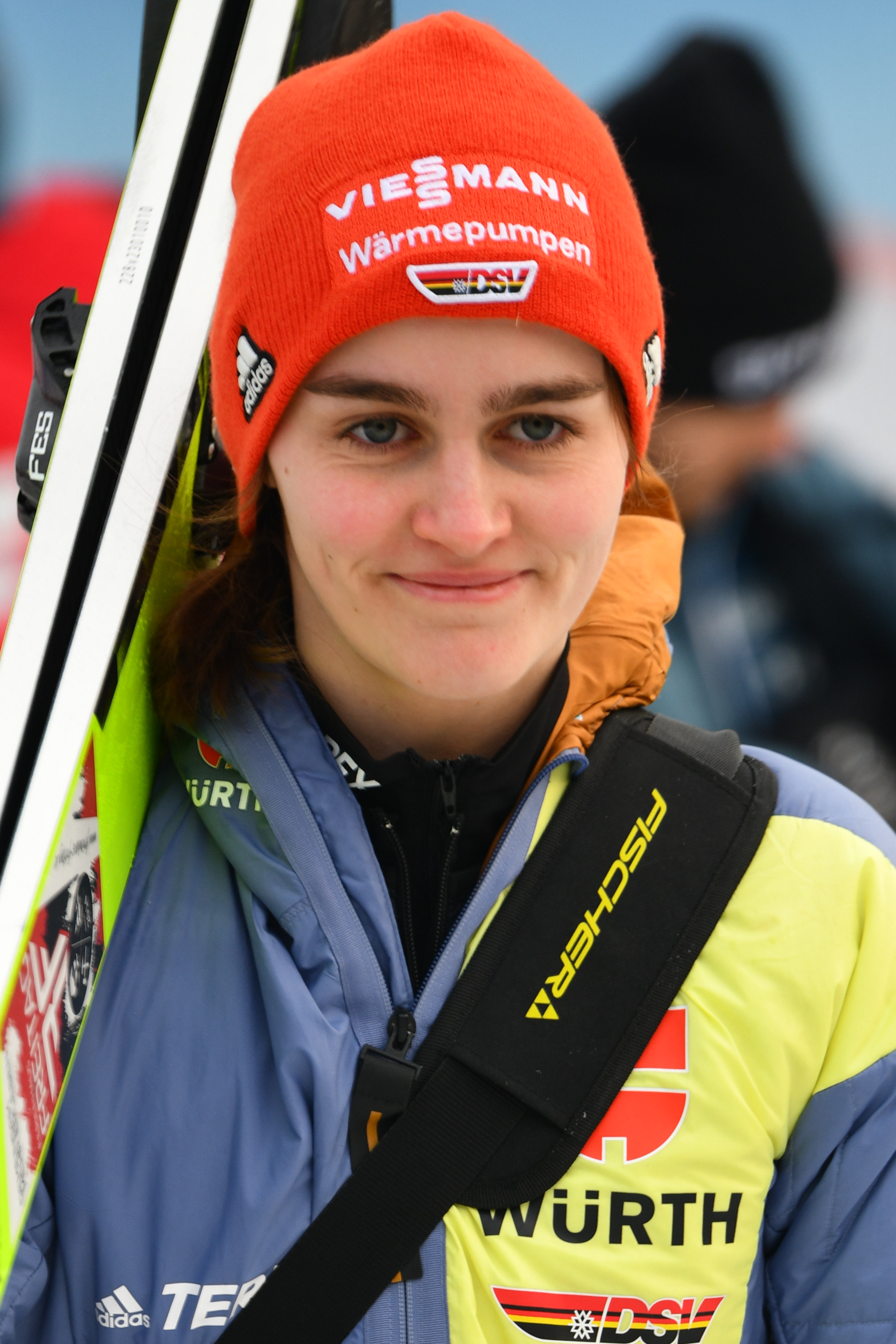
- Freitag in 2023

Personal information
- Born: 19 May 2001 (age 25) Erlabrun, Breitenbrunn, Saxony, Germany
- Height: 1.65 m (5 ft 5 in)

Sport
- Sport: Ski jumping
- Club: WSC Erzgebirge Oberwiesenthal

World Cup career
- Seasons: 2019–present
- Indiv. starts: 147
- Indiv. podiums: 20
- Team starts: 14
- Team podiums: 8
- Team wins: 3

Achievements and titles
- Personal bests: 227.5 m (746 ft); Vikersund, 22 March 2026
Medal record
Representing Germany
Women's ski jumping
World Championships
Gold medal – first place	2023 Planica	Team NH
Gold medal – first place	2023 Planica	Mixed team NH
Silver medal – second place	2025 Trondheim	Individual NH
Silver medal – second place	2025 Trondheim	Individual LH
Bronze medal – third place	2025 Trondheim	Team NH
European Games
Bronze medal – third place	2023 Kraków-Małopolska	Individual LH
Junior World Championships
Silver medal – second place	Lahti 2019	Team NH
Bronze medal – third place	Lahti 2019	Mixed team NH
Bronze medal – third place	Oberwiesenthal 2020	Team NH
- Updated on 22 November 2026

Selina Alma Freitag (born 19 May 2001) is a German ski jumper. She won the overall ranking of the 2016–17 FIS Ski Jumping Alpen Cup, and has competed at World Cup level since the 2018–19 season. Her best individual result is second place, achieved on eleven occasions. At the 2019 Nordic Junior World Ski Championships, she won a silver medal in the team event and a bronze medal in the mixed team event.

Her brother Richard Freitag is also a former ski jumper.

== Major tournament results ==
=== Winter Olympics ===
Year	Normal hill	Large hill	Mixed team
(China) Beijing 2022	22	—N/a	9
(Italy) Milano Cortina 2026	7	17	4

=== FIS Nordic World Ski Championships ===
Year	Normal hill	Large hill	Team	Mixed team
(Slovenia) Planica 2023	4	19	1	1
(Norway) Trondheim 2025	2	2	3	4
