= Ski jumping at the 2016 Winter Youth Olympics – Boys' individual normal hill =

Boys' individual at the II Winter Youth Olympic Games
- Venue: Lysgårdsbakkene Ski Jumping Arena
- Dates: 16 February
- Competitors: 19 from 19 nations
- Points: 262.8

Medalists
| 1st place, gold medalist(s) | | Bor Pavlovčič | Slovenia |
| 2nd place, silver medalist(s) | | Marius Lindvik | Norway |
| 3rd place, bronze medalist(s) | | Jonathan Siegel | Germany |

The boys' ski jumping event at the 2016 Winter Youth Olympics was held on 16 February at the Lysgårdsbakkene Ski Jumping Arena.

== Results ==
| Rank | Bib | Name | Country | Round 1 | | | Final round | | | Total |
| Rank | Bib | Name | Country | Distance (m) | Points | Rank | Distance (m) | Points | Rank | Points |
|---|---|---|---|---|---|---|---|---|---|---|
| 1st place, gold medalist(s) | 16 | Bor Pavlovčič | Slovenia | 101.0 | 130.9 | 1 | 99.0 | 131.9 | 1 | 262.8 |
| 2nd place, silver medalist(s) | 6 | Marius Lindvik | Norway | 98.5 | 129.2 | 2 | 94.0 | 121.8 | 2 | 251.0 |
| 3rd place, bronze medalist(s) | 15 | Jonathan Siegel | Germany | 98.5 | 123.1 | 3 | 90.5 | 112.9 | 5 | 236.0 |
| 4 | 10 | Masamitsu Ito | Japan | 95.5 | 120.6 | 4 | 91.5 | 114.1 | 4 | 234.7 |
| 5 | 19 | Jonathan Learoyd | France | 96.5 | 117.5 | 7 | 92.0 | 114.3 | 3 | 231.8 |
| 6 | 18 | Casey Larson | United States | 97.0 | 119.0 | 6 | 87.0 | 109.1 | 6 | 221.5 |
| 6 | 5 | Andreas Alamommo | Finland | 91.0 | 112.4 | 8 | 90.0 | 102.5 | 9 | 221.5 |
| 8 | 14 | Maksim Sergeev | Russia | 92.5 | 111.2 | 9 | 89.5 | 107.0 | 7 | 218.2 |
| 9 | 8 | Clemens Leitner | Austria | 94.5 | 119.5 | 5 | 83.0 | 98.2 | 10 | 217.7 |
| 10 | 1 | František Holík | Czech Republic | 87.5 | 104.5 | 10 | 88.5 | 104.2 | 8 | 208.7 |
| 11 | 7 | Sandro Hauswirth | Switzerland | 87.0 | 102.8 | 11 | 83.0 | 92.7 | 13 | 195.5 |
| 12 | 3 | Dawid Jarząbek | Poland | 83.0 | 94.6 | 13 | 83.0 | 94.1 | 11 | 188.7 |
| 13 | 13 | Stepan Pasichnyk | Ukraine | 83.5 | 93.8 | 14 | 83.0 | 92.9 | 12 | 186.7 |
| 14 | 12 | Sergey Tkachenko | Kazakhstan | 85.0 | 95.3 | 12 | 82.5 | 91.0 | 14 | 186.3 |
| 15 | 11 | Nicolae Sorin Mitrofan | Romania | 84.0 | 91.0 | 15 | 81.5 | 89.7 | 15 | 180.7 |
| 16 | 17 | Artti Aigro | Estonia | 83.0 | 87.9 | 16 | 79.0 | 82.5 | 16 | 170.4 |
| 17 | 9 | Muhammed Ali Bedir | Turkey | 81.5 | 83.5 | 17 | 76.5 | 72.0 | 17 | 155.5 |
| 18 | 2 | Alessio Longo | Italy | 72.5 | 67.8 | 18 | 71.0 | 58.0 | 18 | 125.8 |
| 19 | 4 | Kristóf Molnár | Hungary | 53.0 | 25.0 | 19 | 63.0 | 39.3 | 19 | 64.3 |
