= Dong Bing =

Chinese ski jumper (born 1996)

Personal information
- Nationality: China
- Born: 10 December 1996 (age 29) Jilin, China

Sport
- Sport: Skiing

World Cup career
- Seasons: 2021–present

Achievements and titles
- Personal bests: 118.5 m (389 ft); Chaykovsky, 11 September 2021
- Updated on 11 February 2022

Dong Bing (born 10 December 1996) is a Chinese ski jumper who competed in the 2022 Winter Olympics.

== Career ==
She competed at the 2022 Winter Olympics and placed 31st in the women's normal hill individual and placed 10th with her team in the mixed team event.
