= Vid Vrhovnik =

Slovenian Nordic combined skier (born 1999)

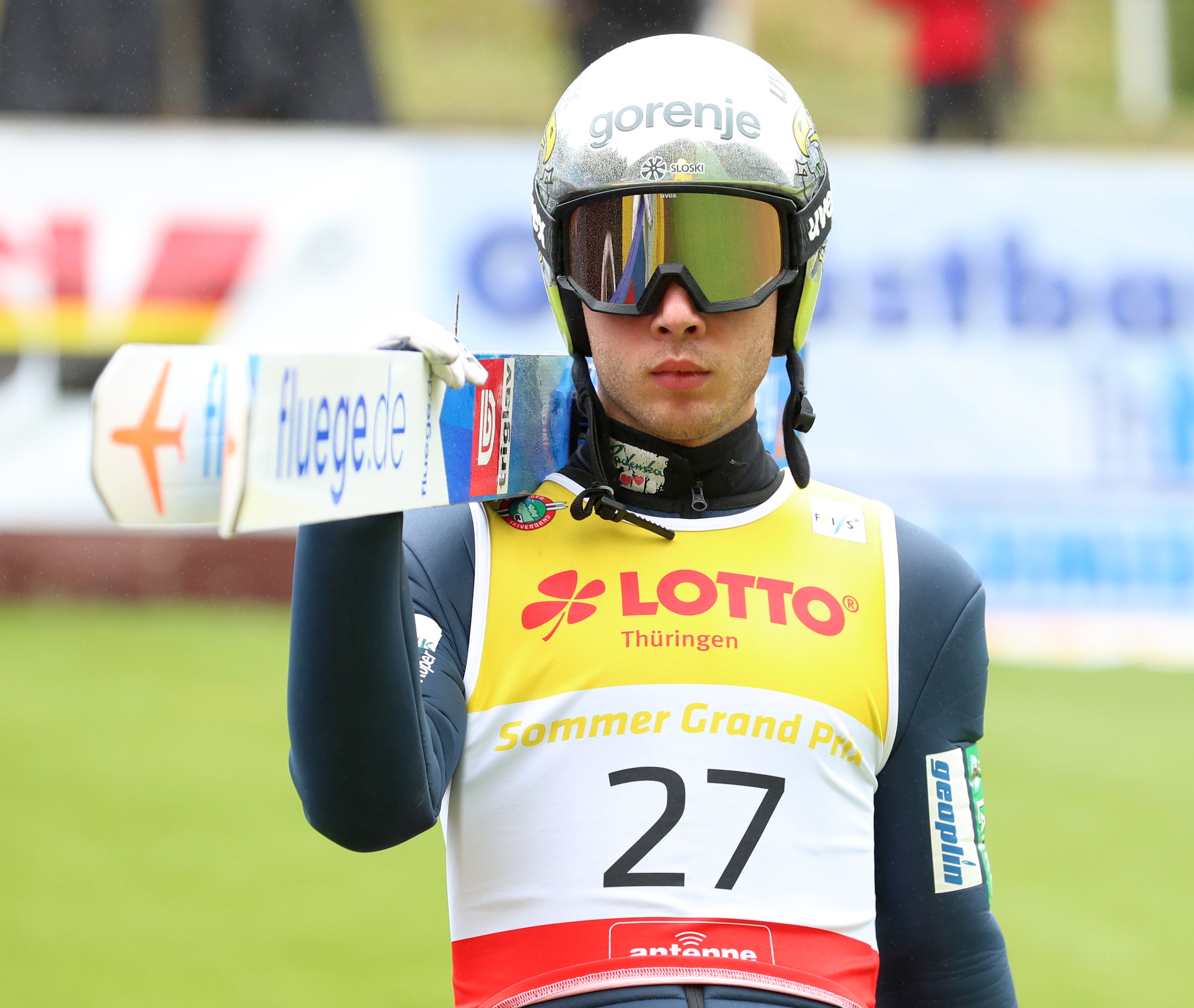
- Vrhovnik in 2021

Personal information
- Born: 12 July 1999 (age 26) Slovenj Gradec, Slovenia
- Height: 176 cm (5 ft 9 in)
- Weight: 66 kg (146 lb)
Medal record
Men's ski jumping
Representing Slovenia
Youth Olympic Games
| Gold medal – first place | 2016 Lillehammer | Mixed team NH |

Vid Vrhovnik (born 12 July 1999 in Slovenj Gradec) is a Slovenian Nordic combined skier.

== Career ==
Vrhovnik won the gold medal at the ski jumping team competition at the 2016 Winter Youth Olympics, together with Ema Klinec and Bor Pavlovčič. In 2018, Vrhovnik became the Junior World Champion in Nordic combined. He represented Slovenia at the 2018 Winter Olympics in Pyeongchang, South Korea. His personal best is 48s.
