= Anna Hoffmann =

American Olympian ski jumper

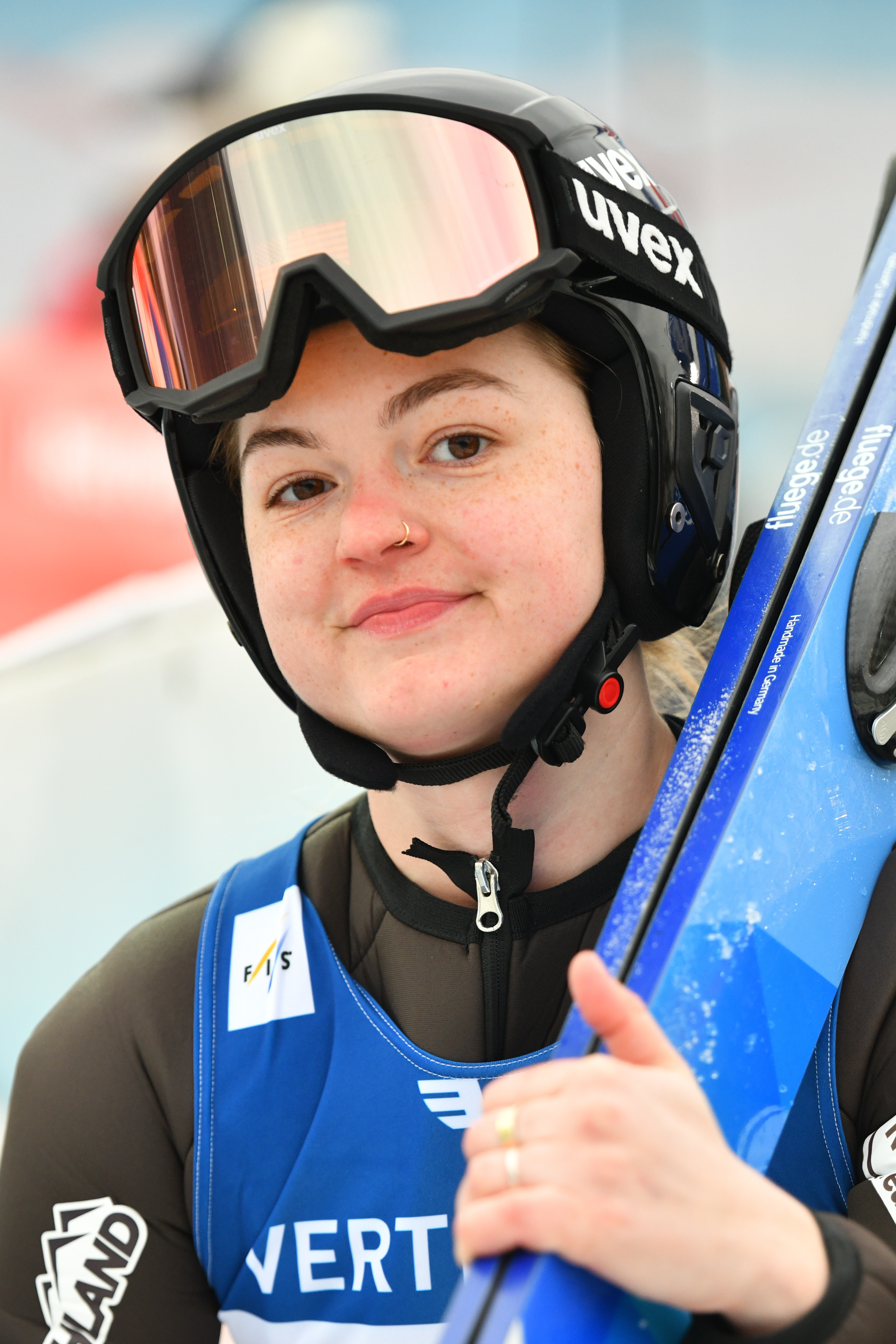
- Hoffmann at the 2023 FIS Ski Jumping World Cup

Personal information
- Born: March 28, 2000 (age 25) Salt Lake City, Utah, U.S.
- Home town: Madison, Wisconsin, U.S.

Anna Hoffmann (born March 28, 2000) is an American ski jumper. She competed in the 2022 Winter Olympics in Beijing.

== Early life and education ==
She came from the Blackhawk ski club, and attends the University of Utah.

When Anna was only 6, she was the youngest of the girl picked for the first-ever camp girls' ski jump camp at the Olympic jumping complex, 8 years before it became an official Olympic sport; Lindsey Van mentored her during that camp.

== Career ==
Hoffmann qualified for the 2022 Olympics after winning the ski jumping competition at the U.S. Nordic Combined & Ski Jump Olympic Trials on December 25, 2021, in Lake Placid, N.Y. She had previously competed in the Junior World Championships 4 times. Hoffmann was the only American woman who qualified to compete for Team USA in the women's individual normal hill. It was due to her inclusion that the U.S. kept their streak alive of having women represented in ski jumping every Olympics since women's ski jump was introduced as an Olympic sport.

The women's ski jump director, Blake Hughes, said of Anna's inclusion, "This nomination for Anna is a testament to her work ethic and commitment to the sport. Anna has become a true leader for her team and it has been a privilege to watch her progress over the past few years as she has become an elite athlete. I am proud that she will get the honor to represent the United States of America at the highest level of competition.”

Hoffmann came in 3rd at the 2022 Ski Jumping National Championships in Park City, Utah.

== Personal life ==
Hoffmann is the youngest of four, all of whom ski. Two of her siblings, Elyse and Joe, were both on the U.S. Junior National Ski Jumping Team.
