= Agnes Reisch =

German ski jumper (born 1999)

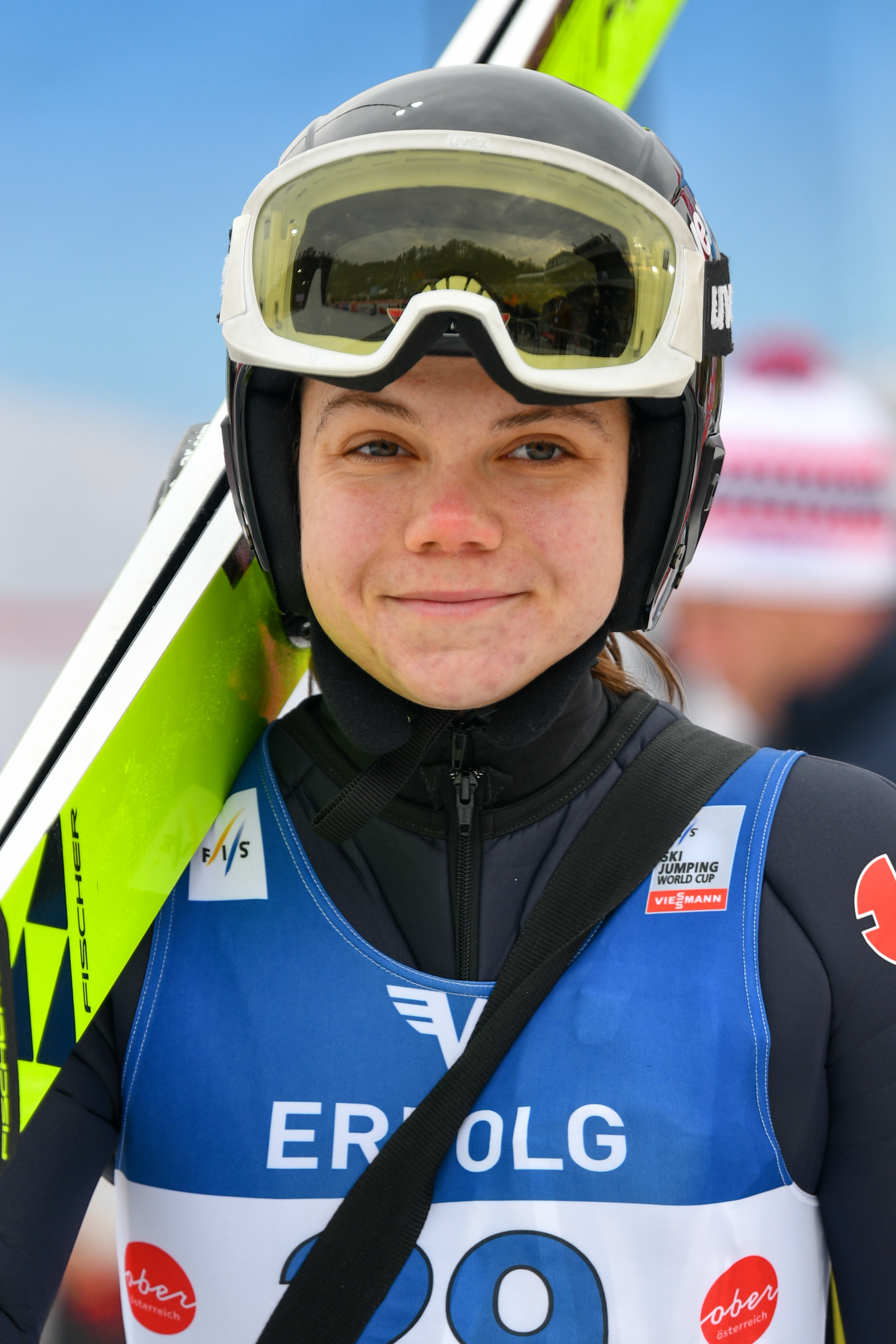
- Reisch in Hinzenbach, 2023

Personal information
- Nationality: Germany
- Born: 11 October 1999 (age 26) Immenstadt, Germany

Sport
- Sport: Skiing
- Club: WSV Isny

World Cup career
- Seasons: 2016–2021; 2023–present
- Indiv. starts: 70
- Indiv. podiums: 1
- Team starts: 4
- Team podiums: 2
- Team wins: 2
Medal record
Women's ski jumping
World Championships
| Bronze medal – third place | 2025 Trondheim | Team NH |
Junior World Championships
| Gold medal – first place | Park City 2017 | Team NH |
| Silver medal – second place | Park City 2017 | Team NH |
Girls' ski jumping
Winter Youth Olympics
| Silver medal – second place | Lillehammer 2016 | Team NH |
- Updated on 1 March 2025

Agnes Reisch (born 11 October 1999) is a German ski jumper. She has competed at World Cup level since the 2015/16 season, with her best individual result being 13th place in Oberstdorf on 30 January 2016, which was also her World Cup debut. At the 2017 Junior World Championships in Park City, she won a team gold and silver medal; at the 2016 Winter Youth Olympics in Lillehammer, she won a team silver medal.

== Nordic World Ski Championships results ==
| Year | Normal hill | Large hill | Team | Mixed team |
|---|---|---|---|---|
| 2025 | 10 | 14 | 3 | — |
