= Bor Pavlovčič =

Slovenian ski jumper

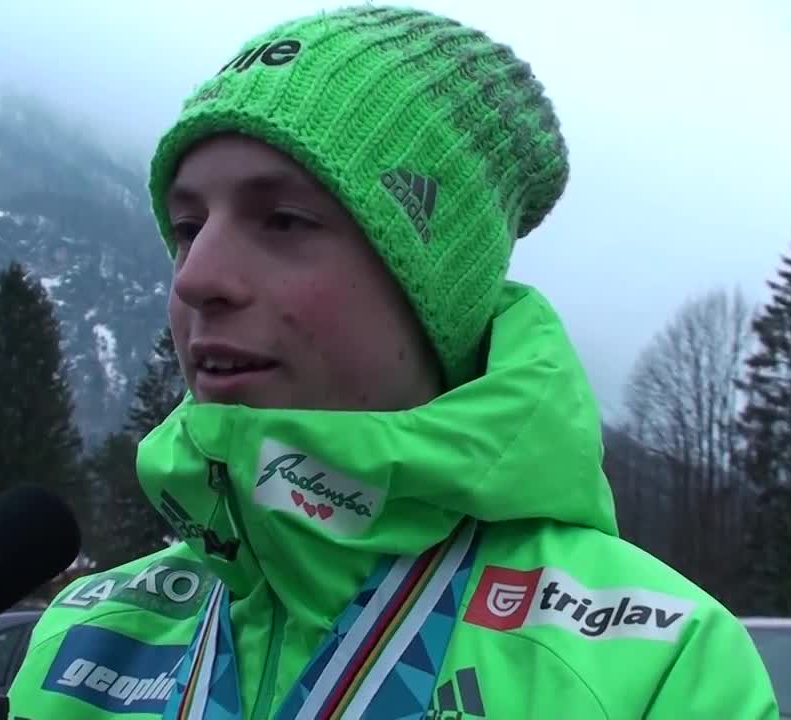
- Pavlovčič in 2016

Personal information
- Born: 27 June 1998 (age 28) Jesenice, Slovenia

Sport
- Sport: Ski jumping

World Cup career
- Seasons: 2016–2019; 2021–2022
- Indiv. starts: 37
- Indiv. podiums: 3
- Team starts: 4

Achievements and titles
- Personal bests: 249.5 m (819 ft); Planica, 28 March 2021
Medal record
Representing Slovenia
Men's ski jumping
Youth Olympic Games
Gold medal – first place	2016 Lillehammer	Individual NH
Gold medal – first place	2016 Lillehammer	Mixed team NH

Bor Pavlovčič (born 27 June 1998) is a retired Slovenian ski jumper.

== Career ==
Pavlovčič made his World Cup debut in January 2016 in Sapporo. His best World Cup result is second place in Klingenthal on 7 February 2021. He also represented Slovenia at the 2016 Winter Youth Olympics, where he won gold in the boy's normal hill competition.

== World Cup results ==
=== Standings ===
Season	Overall	4H	SF	RA
2015–16	57	—	—	N/A
2016–17	67	—	—	—
2017–18	54	—	35	—
2018–19	64	48	50	—
2020–21	13	51	4	N/A
2021–22	65	—	35	—

=== Individual starts ===
winner (1); second (2); third (3); did not compete (–); failed to qualify (q)
Season	1	2	3	4	5	6	7	8	9	10	11	12	13	14	15	16	17	18	19	20	21	22	23	24	25	26	27	28	29	Points
2015–16	Klingenthal	Lillehammer	Lillehammer	Nizhny Tagil	Nizhny Tagil	Engelberg	Engelberg	Oberstdorf	Garmisch-Partenkirchen	Innsbruck	Bischofshofen	Willingen	Zakopane	Sapporo	Sapporo	Trondheim	Vikersund	Vikersund	Vikersund	Lahti	Lahti	Kuopio	Almaty	Almaty	Wisła	Titisee-Neustadt	Planica	Planica	Planica	20
2015–16	–	–	–	–	–	–	–	–	–	–	–	–	–	26	16	–	–	–	–	–	–	–	–	–	–	–	–	–		20
2016–17	Kuusamo	Kuusamo	Klingenthal	Lillehammer	Lillehammer	Engelberg	Engelberg	Oberstdorf	Garmisch-Partenkirchen	Innsbruck	Bischofshofen	Wisła	Wisła	Zakopane	Willingen	Oberstdorf	Oberstdorf	Sapporo	Sapporo	Pyeongchang	Pyeongchang	Oslo	Trondheim	Vikersund	Planica	Planica				3
2016–17	–	–	–	–	–	–	–	–	–	–	–	41	28	40	–	–	–	–	–	–	–	–	–	–	–	–				3
2017–18	Wisła	Kuusamo	Nizhny Tagil	Nizhny Tagil	Titisee-Neustadt	Engelberg	Engelberg	Oberstdorf	Garmisch-Partenkirchen	Innsbruck	Bischofshofen	Tauplitz	Zakopane	Willingen	Willingen	Lahti	Oslo	Lillehammer	Trondheim	Vikersund	Planica	Planica								13
2017–18	–	–	–	–	–	–	–	–	–	–	–	–	–	–	–	–	–	–	–	–	18	–								13
2018–19	Wisła	Kuusamo	Kuusamo	Nizhny Tagil	Nizhny Tagil	Engelberg	Engelberg	Oberstdorf	Garmisch-Partenkirchen	Innsbruck	Bischofshofen	Val di Fiemme	Val di Fiemme	Zakopane	Sapporo	Sapporo	Oberstdorf	Oberstdorf	Oberstdorf	Lahti	Willingen	Willingen	Oslo	Lillehammer	Trondheim	Vikersund	Planica	Planica		8
2018–19	40	33	36	q	50	–	–	40	q	36	q	–	–	–	–	–	–	–	–	25	44	43	–	–	–	–	29	–		8
2020–21	Wisła	Ruka	Ruka	Nizhny Tagil	Nizhny Tagil	Engelberg	Engelberg	Oberstdorf	Garmisch-Partenkirchen	Innsbruck	Bischofshofen	Titisee-Neustadt	Titisee-Neustadt	Zakopane	Lahti	Willingen	Willingen	Klingenthal	Klingenthal	Szczyrk	Szczyrk	Râșnov	Planica	Planica	Planica					559
2020–21	20	7	17	13	11	8	35	33	44	q	–	–	–	41	21	4	15	3	2	5	13	–	5	3	7					559
2021–22	Nizhny Tagil	Nizhny Tagil	Ruka	Ruka	Wisła	Klingenthal	Klingenthal	Engelberg	Engelberg	Oberstdorf	Garmisch-Partenkirchen	Bischofshofen	Bischofshofen	Bischofshofen	Zakopane	Titisee-Neustadt	Titisee-Neustadt	Willingen	Willingen	Lahti	Lahti	Lillehammer	Oslo	Oslo	Oberstdorf	Oberstdorf	Planica	Planica		9
2021–22	–	–	–	–	–	–	–	–	–	–	–	–	–	–	–	–	–	–	–	–	–	–	–	–	–	–	22	–		9
