= Lara Malsiner =

Italian ski jumper (born 2000)

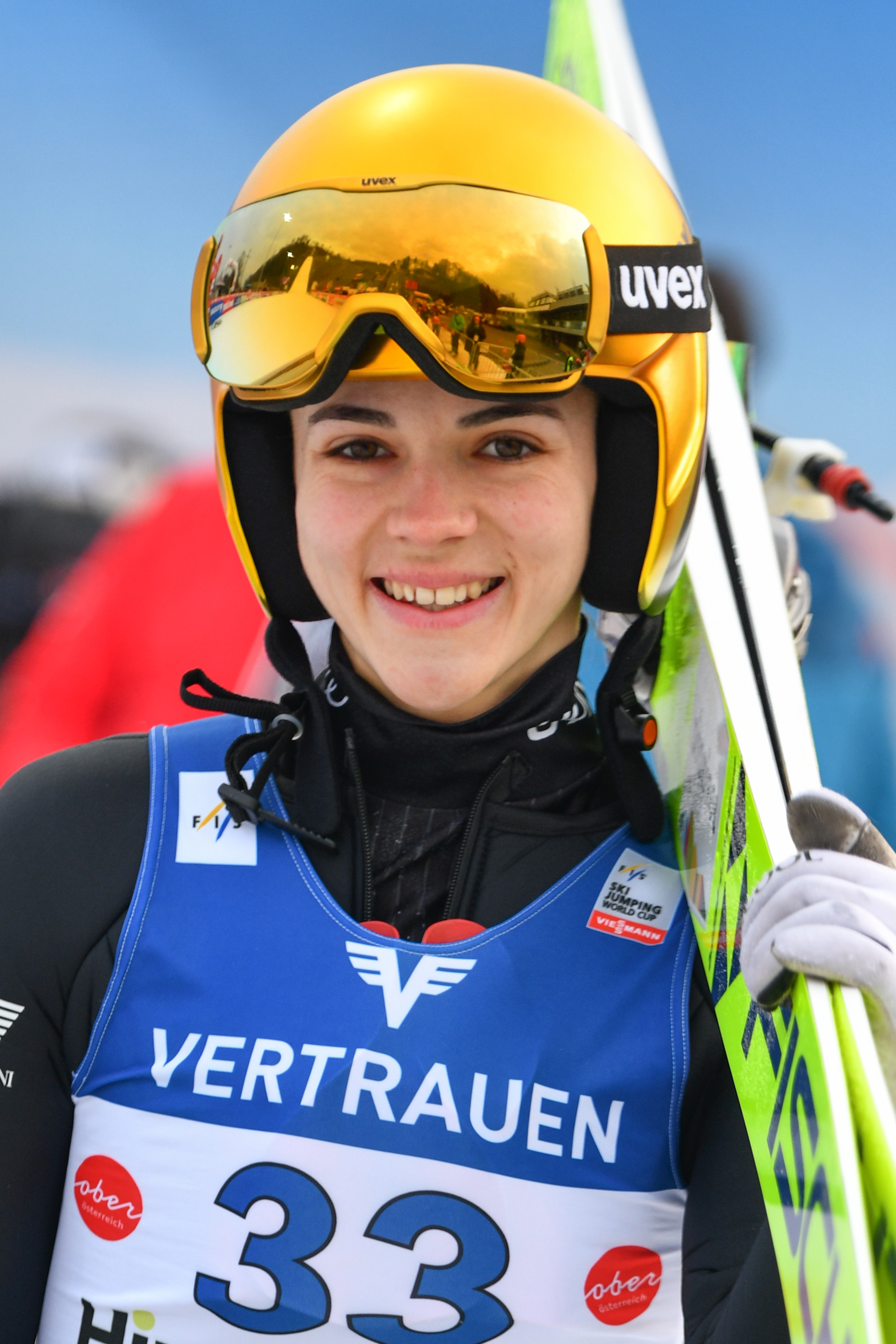
- Malsiner in Hinzenbach, 2023

Personal information
- Nationality: Italy
- Born: 14 April 2000 (age 26) Sterzing, South Tyrol, Italy
- Height: 168 cm (5 ft 6 in)

Sport
- Sport: Skiing
- Club: Gardena-Raiffeisen

World Cup career
- Seasons: 2016–present
- Indiv. starts: 53
- Indiv. podiums: 1
- Team starts: 1
Medal record
Representing Italy
Girls' Ski jumping
Winter Youth Olympics
| Bronze medal – third place | 2016 Lillehammer | Individual NH |
Women's ski jumping
Junior World Championships
| Bronze medal – third place | 2020 Oberwiesenthal | Individual NH |
- Updated on 8 March 2020

Lara Malsiner (born 14 April 2000) is an Italian ski jumper. She has competed at World Cup level since the 2015/16 season, with her best individual result being third place in Hinzenbach on 9 February 2020. Her older sister is Manuela Malsiner and her younger sister is Jessica Malsiner, both of whom compete at World Cup level.
