= Joséphine Pagnier =

French ski jumper (born 2002)

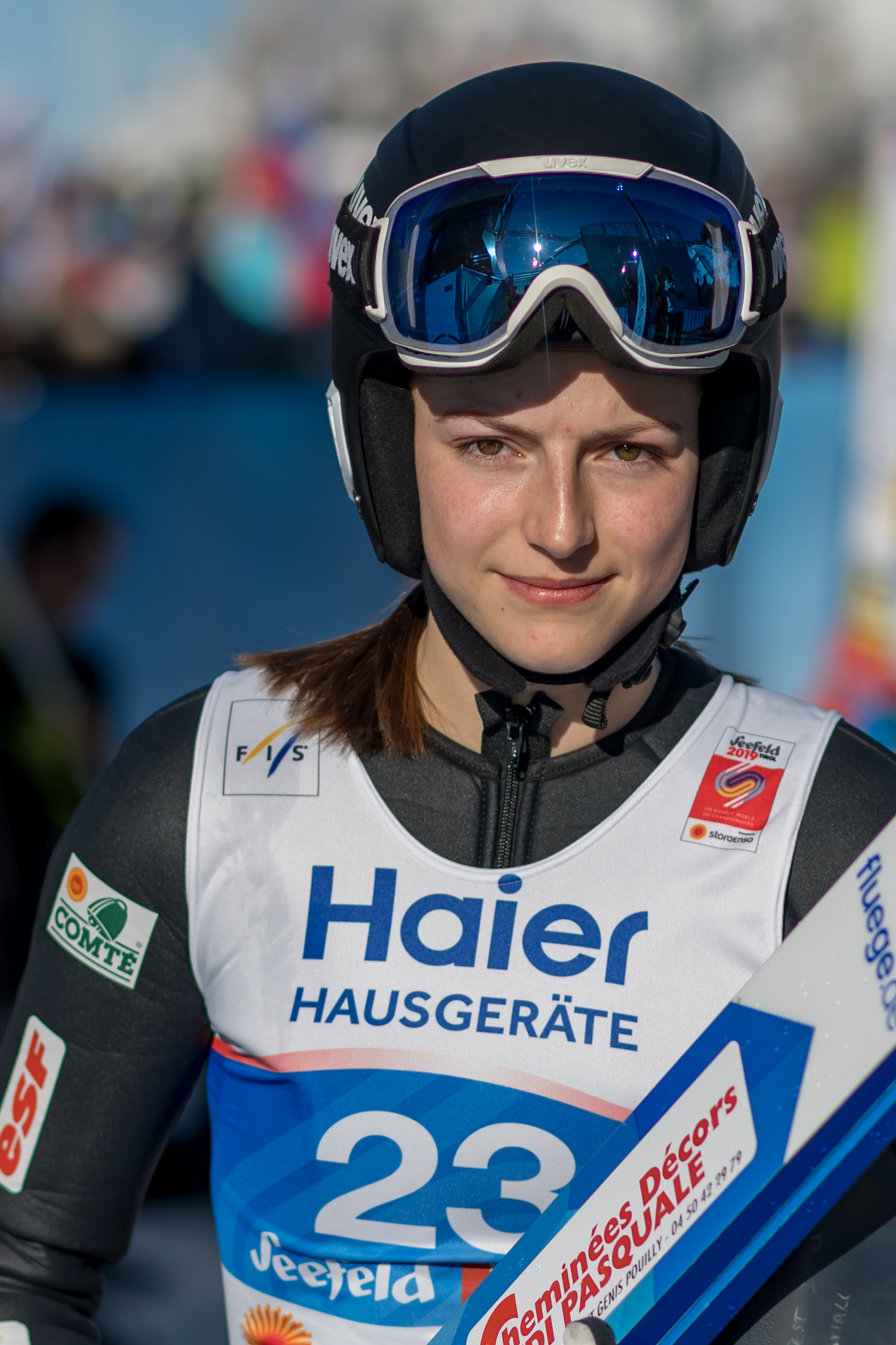
- Pagnier in 2019

Personal information
- Nationality: France
- Born: 4 June 2002 (age 24) Chaux-Neuve, France

Sport
- Sport: Skiing

World Cup career
- Indiv. starts: 103
- Indiv. podiums: 4
- Indiv. wins: 2

Achievements and titles
- Personal bests: 181 m (594 ft); Vikersund, 17 March 2024
Medal record
Youth Olympic Games
Silver medal – second place	2020 Lausanne	Girl's individual
Bronze medal – third place	2020 Lausanne	Mixed team
- Updated on 21 March 2024

Joséphine Pagnier (born 4 June 2002) is a French ski jumper.

She won two medals at the 2020 Winter Youth Olympics and won the French national championship in 2019 and 2020. She competed in the normal hill event at the 2022 Winter Olympics and came third at a 2021–22 FIS Ski Jumping World Cup event in Aigner-Schanze.

== Career ==
In 2016, Pagnier jumped over 100 metres (330 ft) for the first time in her career, during a junior event at Fichtelbergschanzen, Germany. She was aged 14 at the time. She won the two 2016–17 FIS Ski Jumping Continental Cup events in Notodden Municipality, Norway. She made her FIS Ski Jumping World Cup debut in 2017 in Hinterzarten, Germany. She was part of the French team that won the ladies' team event at the 2018 Nordic Junior World Ski Championships. Pagnier won the French National Ski Jumping Championships in 2019 and 2020. She was promoted to the French senior team ahead of the 2019–20 season; she was the only French female ski jumper added to the senior team that season.

At the 2020 Winter Youth Olympics, Pagnier won a silver in the girls' individual event and a bronze medal in the mixed team event. She also competed in the ski jumping part of the mixed team Nordic Combined event, where France finished fourth. At the 2021 Nordic Junior World Ski Championships, Pagnier came second in the girl's individual event. At the FIS Nordic World Ski Championships 2021, Pagnier came 16th in the women's individual event. She won one 2021–22 FIS Cup summer event in Gérardmer, France, and finished third in another. She came fourth at one 2021–22 FIS Ski Jumping World Cup event in Willingen, Germany, and sixth in another event at the same venue.

Pagnier qualified to compete in the normal hill event at the 2022 Winter Olympics. A few days before the Games, she finished fourth in a World Cup event. At the Games, Pagnier finished seventh overall in the first round and finished 11th after the second and final round. She was unable to compete in the mixed team event at the Games, as there were too few French athletes to compete with. After the Games, Pagnier was described as the future of French ski jumping.

Pagnier finished third in a normal hill event at the 2021–22 FIS Ski Jumping World Cup meeting in Aigner-Schanze.

During the 2023-24 season, she first finished 2nd and won the next event, taking the World Cup lead.

== World Cup ==
=== Standings ===
Season	Position	Points
2018–19	30	94
2019–20	32	48
2020–21	22	143
2021–22	11	387
2022–23	16	439
2023–24	7	843

=== Wins ===
No.	Season	Date	Location	Hill	Size
1	2023/24	3 December 2023	(Norway) Lillehammer	Lysgårdsbakken HS140	LH
2	2023/24	15 December 2023	(Switzerland) Engelberg	Gross-Titlis-Schanze HS140	LH

== Personal life ==
Pagnier is from Chaux-Neuve, and as of 2022, she lives in Franche-Comté, France. She is coached by her father Joël.
