= Sofia Tikhonova =

Russian ski jumper (born 1998)

Sofia Tikhonova Со́фья Ти́хонова
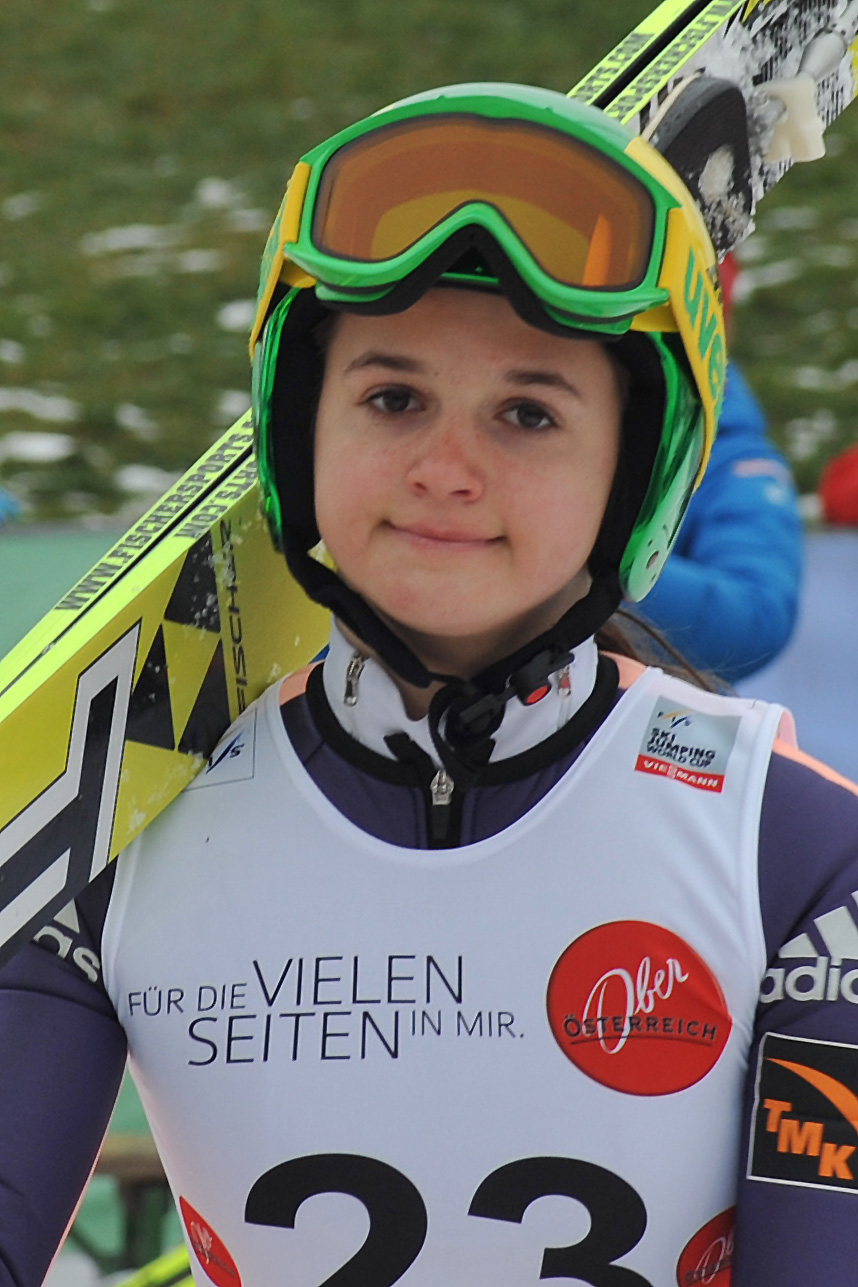
- Tikhonova in Hinzenbach, 2014

Personal information
- Full name: Sofia Dmitrievna Tikhonova
- Nationality: Russia
- Born: 16 November 1998 (age 27) Saint Petersburg, Russia

Sport
- Sport: Skiing
- Club: Saint Petersburg KOR1 Dinamo

World Cup career
- Seasons: 2014–present
- Indiv. starts: 69
- Team starts: 2
- Team podiums: 2
Medal record
Women's ski jumping
Junior World Championships
Gold medal – first place	2015 Almaty	Individual NH
Silver medal – second place	2015 Almaty	Team NH
Bronze medal – third place	2016 Râșnov	Individual NH
Silver medal – second place	2018 Kandersteg	Team NH
Girls' ski jumping
Winter Youth Olympics
Silver medal – second place	2016 Lillehammer	Individual NH
European Youth Olympic Festival
Gold medal – first place	2015 Tschagguns	Individual NH
Silver medal – second place	2015 Tschagguns	Mixed team NH
- Updated on 2 July 2018

Sofia Dmitrievna Tikhonova (Russian: Со́фья Дми́триевна Ти́хонова; born 16 November 1998) is a Russian ski jumper who has competed at World Cup level since the 2013/14 season.

== Career ==
Tikhonova's best individual World Cup result is fourth place in Lillehammer on 5 December 2014; her best team result is third in Zaō on 20 January 2018.

At the Junior World Championships, she won an individual gold medal and a team silver medal in 2015, individual bronze in 2016, and team silver in 2018. At the Winter Youth Olympics, she won individual silver in 2016. At the European Youth Olympic Festival, she won individual gold and mixed team silver in 2015.
