= Jenny Rautionaho =

Finnish ski jumper (born 1996)

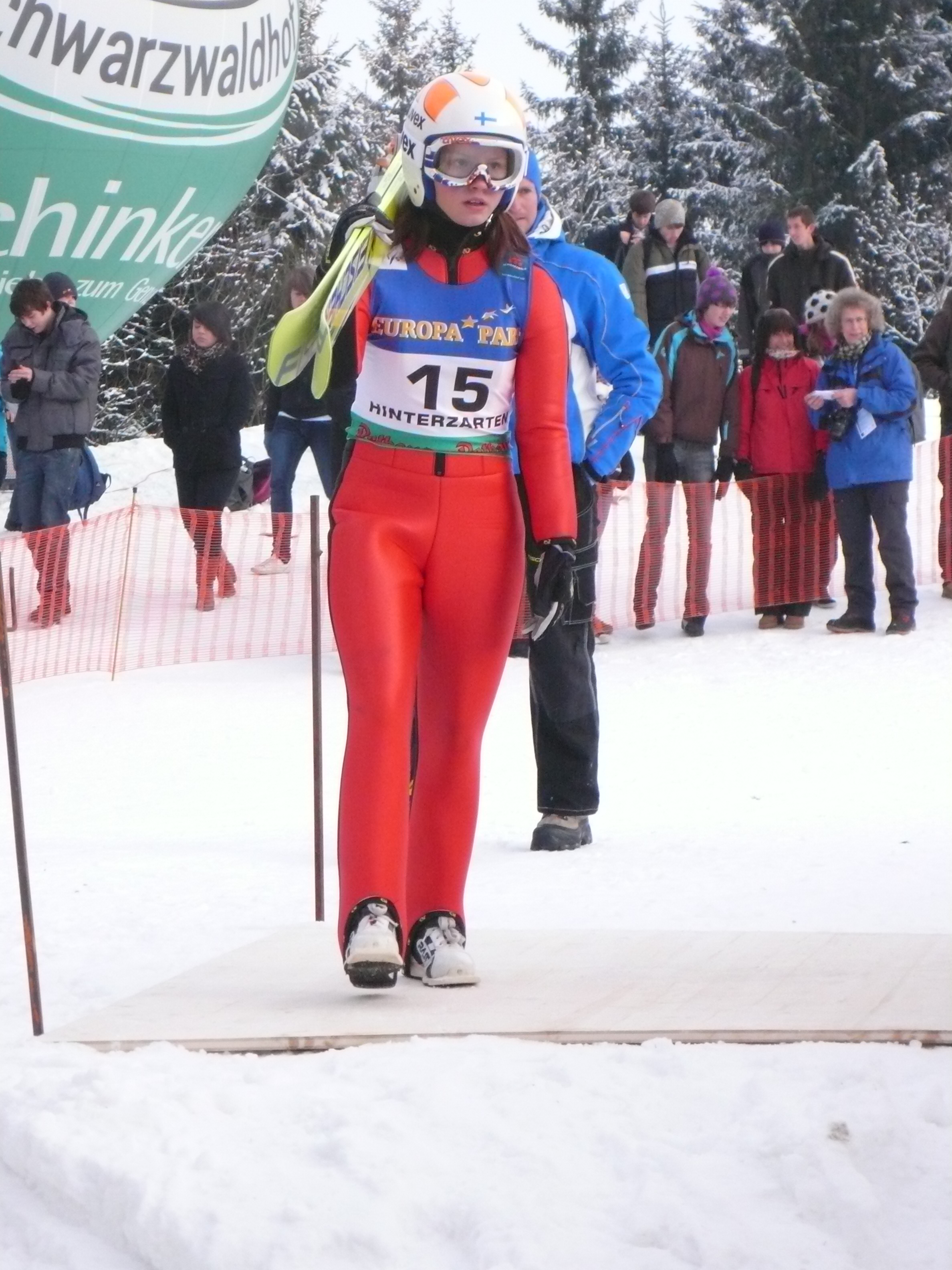
- Rautionaho in Hinterzarten, 2010

Personal information
- Nationality: Finland
- Born: 26 July 1996 (age 29) Rovaniemi, Finland

Sport
- Sport: Skiing
- Club: Ounasvaaran Hiihtoseura

World Cup career
- Seasons: 2013; 2016; 2020–present
- Indiv. starts: 57
- Indiv. podiums: 1
- Team starts: 8

Achievements and titles
- Personal bests: 218.5 m (717 ft); Vikersund, 21 March 2026
- Updated on 22 March 2026

Jenny Rautionaho (born 26 July 1996) is a Finnish ski jumper who has competed at World Cup level since the 2019–20 season. Her father is former ski jumper Esko Rautionaho.

== Career ==
Rautionaho's best individual World Cup result is second place in Sapporo on 13 January 2024. Her best team World Cup result is 6th place in Oslo on 4 March 2022. In the Continental Cup, her best individual result is fourth place in Oslo (twice) on 18–19 September 2021. At the 2023 Nordic World Ski Championships, she achieved sixth place representing Finland in the mixed team normal hill competition.
