= Ema Klinec =

Slovenian ski jumper (born 1998)

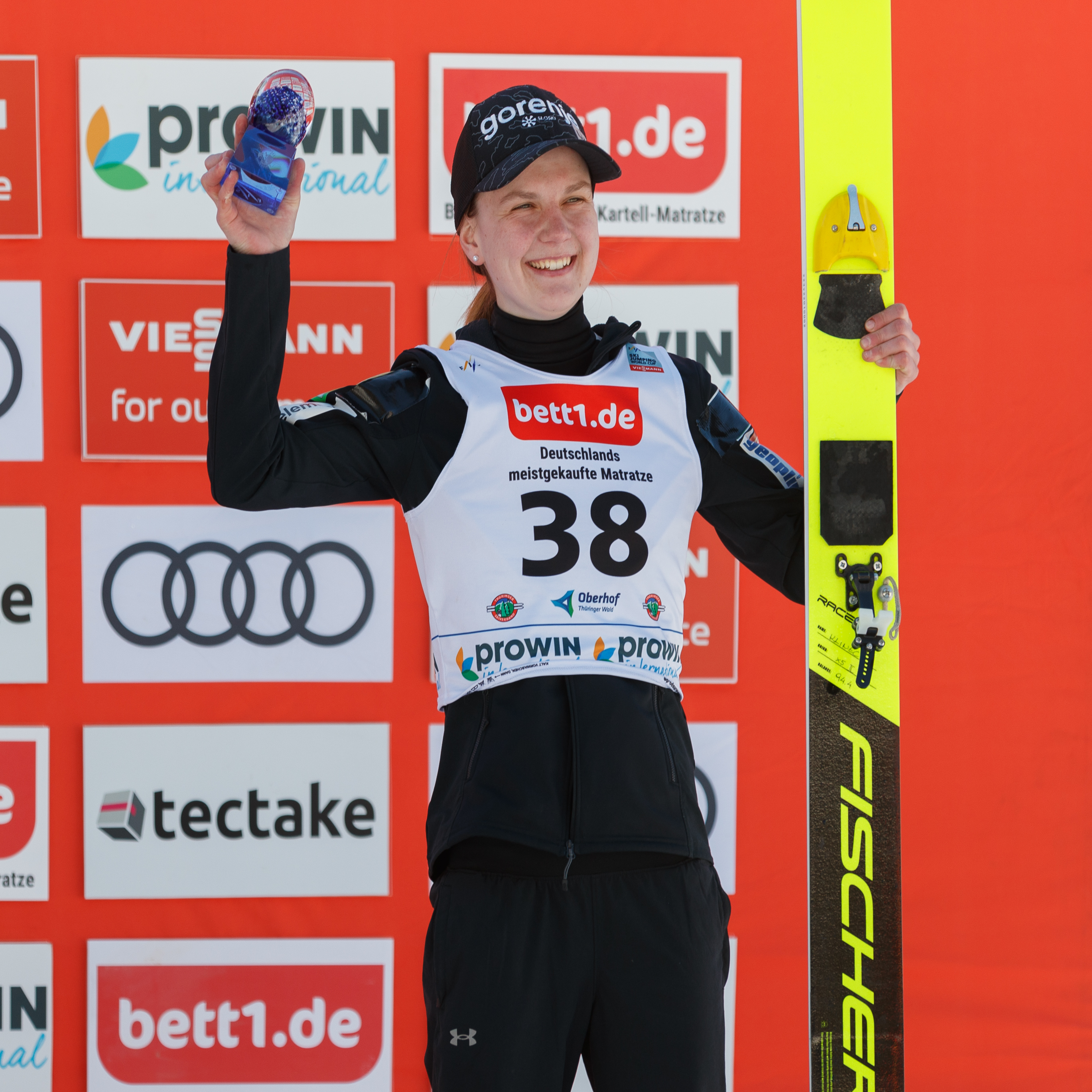
- Klinec in 2022

Personal information
- Born: 2 July 1998 (age 28) Kranj, Slovenia
- Height: 1.65 m (5 ft 5 in)

Sport
- Sport: Ski jumping

World Cup career
- Seasons: 2014, 2016–2026
- Indiv. starts: 163
- Indiv. podiums: 31
- Indiv. wins: 2
- Team starts: 15
- Team podiums: 5
- Team wins: 2
- Raw Air titles: 1 (2023)

Achievements and titles
- Personal bests: 226 m (741 ft); Vikersund, 19 March 2023
Medal record
Representing Slovenia
Women's ski jumping
World Championships
| Gold medal – first place | 2021 Oberstdorf | Individual NH |
| Silver medal – second place | 2021 Oberstdorf | Team NH |
| Silver medal – second place | 2025 Trondheim | Mixed team LH |
| Bronze medal – third place | 2023 Planica | Mixed team NH |
Youth Olympic Games
| Gold medal – first place | 2016 Lillehammer | Individual NH |
| Gold medal – first place | 2016 Lillehammer | Mixed team NH |

Ema Klinec (born 2 July 1998) is a Slovenian former ski jumper. In February 2021, she became the first Slovenian female ski jumping world champion after winning the normal hill event at the FIS Nordic World Ski Championships 2021.

On 18 March 2023, Klinec landed at 203 metres (666 ft) in her second jump at the Vikersundbakken ski flying hill, becoming the first woman to officially jump over 200 metres. The next day, she set a new world record at 226 metres (741 ft), and also won the first ever women's ski flying event in history.

== Major tournament results ==
=== Winter Olympics ===
| Year | Place | NH |
|---|---|---|
| 2018 | (South Korea) Pyeongchang | 14 |
| 2022 | (China) Beijing | 5 |

=== FIS Nordic World Ski Championships ===
| Year | Place | NH | Team | Mixed | LH |
|---|---|---|---|---|---|
| 2017 | (Finland) Lahti | 5 | N/A | 4 | N/A |
| 2021 | (Germany) Oberstdorf | 1st place, gold medalist(s) | 2nd place, silver medalist(s) | 4 | 6 |
| 2023 | (Slovenia) Planica | 19 | 4 | 3rd place, bronze medalist(s) | 7 |
| 2025 | (Norway) Trondheim | 13 | 4 | 2nd place, silver medalist(s) | 15 |

== World Cup record ==
=== Overall standings ===
| Season | Position | Points |
|---|---|---|
| 2013–14 | 25 | 175 |
| 2015–16 | 9 | 426 |
| 2016–17 | 7 | 630 |
| 2017–18 | 11 | 381 |
| 2018–19 | 24 | 214 |
| 2019–20 | 8 | 496 |
| 2020–21 | 6 | 492 |
| 2021–22 | 7 | 680 |
| 2022–23 | 3 | 1,281 |
| 2023–24 | 13 | 540 |
| 2024–25 | 9 | 710 |
| 2025–26 | 45 | 49 |

=== Individual wins ===
| No. | Season | Date | Location | Hill | Size |
|---|---|---|---|---|---|
| 1 | 2021–22 | 27 November 2021 | (Russia) Nizhny Tagil | Tramplin Stork HS97 | NH |
| 2 | 2022–23 | 12 March 2023 | (Norway) Oslo | Holmenkollbakken HS134 | LH |

=== Individual starts ===
winner (1); second (2); third (3); did not compete (–); failed to qualify (q); disqualified (DQ)
| Season | 1 | 2 | 3 | 4 | 5 | 6 | 7 | 8 | 9 | 10 | 11 | 12 | 13 | 14 | 15 | 16 | 17 | 18 | 19 | 20 | 21 | 22 | 23 | 24 | 25 | 26 | 27 | 28 | 29 | 30 | 31 | 32 | 33 |
| 2013–14 | Lillehammer | Hinterzarten | Hinterzarten | Chaykovsky, Perm Krai | Chaykovsky, Perm Krai | Sapporo | Sapporo | Zaō Onsen | Zaō Onsen | Planica | Planica | Hinzenbach | Hinzenbach | Râșnov | Râșnov | Oslo | Falun | Planica |
| 2013–14 | 7 | 8 | 12 | 5 | 6 | – | – | – | – | – | – | – | – | – | – | – | – | – |
| 2015–16 | Lillehammer | Nizhny Tagil | Nizhny Tagil | Sapporo | Sapporo | Zaō Onsen | Zaō Onsen | Oberstdorf | Oberstdorf | Oslo | Hinzenbach | Hinzenbach | Ljubno ob Savinji | Ljubno ob Savinji | Lahti | Almaty | Almaty |
| 2015–16 | 32 | 16 | 31 | 2 | 9 | 23 | 3 | 3 | 4 | 4 | 9 | 5 | – | – | – | – | – |
| 2016–17 | Lillehammer | Lillehammer | Nizhny Tagil | Nizhny Tagil | Oberstdorf | Oberstdorf | Sapporo | Sapporo | Zaō Onsen | Zaō Onsen | Râșnov | Râșnov | Hinzenbach | Hinzenbach | Ljubno ob Savinji | Ljubno ob Savinji | Pyeongchang | Pyeongchang | Oslo |
| 2016–17 | 10 | 10 | 6 | 7 | 7 | 2 | 4 | 11 | 8 | 6 | – | – | – | – | 5 | 5 | 3 | 4 | 6 |
| 2017–18 | Lillehammer | Lillehammer | Lillehammer | Hinterzarten | Sapporo | Sapporo | Zaō Onsen | Zaō Onsen | Ljubno ob Savinji | Ljubno ob Savinji | Râșnov | Râșnov | Oslo | Oberstdorf | Oberstdorf |
| 2017–18 | 26 | 20 | 11 | 10 | q | 8 | 6 | 8 | 6 | 9 | 8 | 8 | 14 | 6 | 13 |
| 2018–19 | Lillehammer | Lillehammer | Lillehammer | Prémanon | Prémanon | Sapporo | Sapporo | Zaō Onsen | Zaō Onsen | Râșnov | Râșnov | Hinzenbach | Hinzenbach | Ljubno ob Savinji | Ljubno ob Savinji | Oberstdorf | Oberstdorf | Oslo | Lillehammer | Trondheim | Nizhny Tagil | Nizhny Tagil | Chaykovsky, Perm Krai | Chaykovsky, Perm Krai |
| 2018–19 | 9 | 3 | 16 | 3 | 4 | – | – | – | – | – | – | – | – | – | – | – | – | – | – | – | – | – | – | – |
| 2019–20 | Lillehammer | Lillehammer | Klingenthal | Sapporo | Sapporo | Zaō Onsen | Zaō Onsen | Râșnov | Râșnov | Oberstdorf | Oberstdorf | Hinzenbach | Hinzenbach | Ljubno ob Savinji | Oslo | Lillehammer |
| 2019–20 | 4 | 4 | 2 | 13 | 16 | 7 | 14 | 15 | 16 | 10 | 12 | 20 | 15 | 6 | 7 | 5 |
| 2020–21 | Ramsau am Dachstein | Ljubno ob Savinji | Titisee-Neustadt | Titisee-Neustadt | Hinzenbach | Hinzenbach | Hinzenbach | Râșnov | Râșnov | Nizhny Tagil | Nizhny Tagil | Chaykovsky, Perm Krai | Chaykovsky, Perm Krai |
| 2020–21 | – | 2 | 3 | 5 | 2 | 10 | 13 | 5 | 4 | 11 | 18 | 22 | 6 |
| 2021–22 | Nizhny Tagil | Nizhny Tagil | Lillehammer | Lillehammer | Klingenthal | Klingenthal | Ramsau am Dachstein | Ljubno ob Savinji | Ljubno ob Savinji | Willingen | Willingen | Hinzenbach | Hinzenbach | Lillehammer | Lillehammer | Oslo | Oslo | Oberhof | Oberhof |
| 2021–22 | 2 | 1 | 9 | 4 | 13 | 7 | 5 | 3 | 4 | 3 | 5 | – | – | – | – | – | – | 5 | 3 |
| 2022–23 | Wisła | Wisła | Lillehammer | Lillehammer | Titisee-Neustadt | Villach | Villach | Ljubno ob Savinji | Ljubno ob Savinji | Sapporo | Sapporo | Zaō Onsen | Zaō Onsen | Hinterzarten | Hinterzarten | Willingen | Willingen | Hinzenbach | Hinzenbach | Râșnov | Râșnov | Oslo | Oslo | Lillehammer | Lillehammer | Lahti |
| 2022–23 | 8 | 11 | 21 | 5 | 12 | 8 | 7 | 4 | 9 | 2 | 2 | 12 | 18 | 2 | 2 | 2 | 6 | 2 | 4 | 5 | 5 | 2 | 1 | 3 | 6 | 10 |
| 2023–24 | Lillehammer | Lillehammer | Engelberg | Engelberg | Garmisch-Partenkirchen | Oberstdorf | Villach | Villach | Sapporo | Sapporo | Zaō Onsen | Ljubno ob Savinji | Ljubno ob Savinji | Willingen | Willingen | Hinzenbach | Hinzenbach | Lahti | Oslo | Oslo | Trondheim | Trondheim | Vikersund | Planica |
| 2023–24 | 14 | 5 | 3 | 2 | 11 | 7 | 21 | 21 | 9 | 14 | – | – | – | – | – | 13 | 26 | 13 | 8 | 4 | 37 | 20 | 3 | 19 |
| 2024–25 | Lillehammer | Lillehammer | Zhangjiakou | Zhangjiakou | Engelberg | Garmisch-Partenkirchen | Oberstdorf | Villach | Villach | Sapporo | Sapporo | Zaō Onsen | Zaō Onsen | Willingen | Lake Placid, New York | Lake Placid, New York | Ljubno ob Savinji | Ljubno ob Savinji | Hinzenbach | Hinzenbach | Oslo | Vikersund | Lahti | Lahti |
| 2024–25 | DQ | 13 | 4 | 2 | 6 | 12 | 6 | 12 | 6 | 7 | 13 | 13 | 15 | 10 | 9 | 11 | 11 | 16 | – | – | 13 | 2 | 10 | 3 |
| 2025–26 | Lillehammer | Lillehammer | Falun | Falun | Wisła | Wisła | Klingenthal | Klingenthal | Engelberg | Engelberg | Garmisch-Partenkirchen | Oberstdorf | Villach | Villach | Ljubno ob Savinji | Ljubno ob Savinji | Zhangjiakou | Zhangjiakou | Zaō Onsen | Zaō Onsen | Sapporo | Sapporo | Willingen | Willingen | Hinzenbach | Hinzenbach | Lahti | Lahti | Oslo | Oslo | Vikersund | Vikersund | Planica |
| 2025–26 | – | – | – | – | – | – | – | – | – | – | – | – | – | – | – | – | – | – | – | – | – | – | – | – | – | – | 26 | 17 | 15 | 17 | – | – | – |
