= United States at the 2026 Winter Olympics =

- Flag of the United States
- IOC code: USA
- NOC: United States Olympic & Paralympic Committee
- Website: www.teamusa.org

in Milan and Cortina d'Ampezzo, Italy 6 February 2026 – 22 February 2026
- Competitors: 232 (117 men and 115 women) in 16 sports
- Flag bearers (opening): Frank Del Duca & Erin Jackson
- Flag bearers (closing): Hilary Knight & Evan Bates
- Medals Ranked 2nd: Gold 12 Silver 12 Bronze 9 Total 33

Winter Olympics appearances (overview)
- 1924; 1928; 1932; 1936; 1948; 1952; 1956; 1960; 1964; 1968; 1972; 1976; 1980; 1984; 1988; 1992; 1994; 1998; 2002; 2006; 2010; 2014; 2018; 2022; 2026

The United States competed at the 2026 Winter Olympics in Milan and Cortina d'Ampezzo, Italy, from 6 to 22 February 2026. This was the country's 25th appearance at the Olympic Winter Games. As Utah will be the host region of the 2034 Winter Olympics, the United States entered the stadium before France, which is hosting the 2030 Winter Olympics in the French Alps, and the host nation Italy during the parade of nations at the opening ceremony.

American athletes won a total of 12 gold medals, which surpassed its highest medal haul of 10 golds in 2002. With a total of 33 medals, this was the third-most successful Winter Olympics for the United States after 2010 and 2002. The U.S. was one of only two delegations to compete in all 16 sport disciplines, along with host Italy, and medaled in 11 – the most of any participating nation.

== Medalists ==
The following U.S. competitors won medals at the games. In the by discipline sections below, medalists' names are bolded.

Medal	Name	Sport	Event	Date
Gold	Breezy Johnson	Alpine skiing	Women's downhill	February 8
Gold	Evan Bates; Madison Chock; Amber Glenn; Ellie Kam; Alysa Liu^{[a]} Ilia Malinin; Daniel O'Shea	Figure skating	Team event	February 8
Gold	Elizabeth Lemley	Freestyle skiing	Women's moguls	February 11
Gold	Jordan Stolz	Speed skating	Men's 1000 m	February 11
Gold	Jordan Stolz	Speed skating	Men's 500 m	February 14
Gold	Elana Meyers Taylor	Bobsleigh	Women's monobob	February 16
Gold	Mikaela Shiffrin	Alpine skiing	Women's slalom	February 18
Gold	Alysa Liu	Figure skating	Women's singles	February 19
Gold	United States women's national ice hockey team: Cayla Barnes; Hannah Bilka; Alex Carpenter; Kendall Coyne Schofield; Britta Curl-Salemme; Joy Dunne; Laila Edwards; Aerin Frankel; Rory Guilday; Caroline Harvey; Taylor Heise; Tessa Janecke; Megan Keller; Hilary Knight; Ava McNaughton; Abbey Murphy; Kelly Pannek; Gwyneth Philips; Hayley Scamurra; Kirsten Simms; Lee Stecklein; Haley Winn; Grace Zumwinkle	Ice hockey	Women's tournament	February 19
Gold	Alex Ferreira	Freestyle skiing	Men's halfpipe	February 20
Gold	Connor Curran; Kaila Kuhn; Christopher Lillis	Freestyle skiing	Mixed team aerials	February 21
Gold	United States men's national ice hockey team: Matt Boldy; Kyle Connor; Jack Eichel; Brock Faber; Jake Guentzel; Noah Hanifin; Connor Hellebuyck; Jack Hughes; Quinn Hughes; Clayton Keller; Jackson LaCombe; Dylan Larkin; Auston Matthews; Charlie McAvoy; J. T. Miller; Brock Nelson; Jake Oettinger; Jake Sanderson; Jaccob Slavin; Jeremy Swayman; Tage Thompson; Brady Tkachuk; Matthew Tkachuk; Vincent Trocheck; Zach Werenski	Ice hockey	Men's tournament	February 22
Silver	Ben Ogden	Cross-country skiing	Men's sprint	February 10
Silver	Korey Dropkin; Cory Thiesse	Curling	Mixed doubles	February 10
Silver	Alex Hall	Freestyle skiing	Men's slopestyle	February 10
Silver	Ryan Cochran-Siegle	Alpine skiing	Men's super-G	February 11
Silver	Evan Bates; Madison Chock	Figure skating	Ice dance	February 11
Silver	Jaelin Kauf	Freestyle skiing	Women's moguls	February 11
Silver	Chloe Kim	Snowboarding	Women's halfpipe	February 12
Silver	Jaelin Kauf	Freestyle skiing	Women's dual moguls	February 14
Silver	Mac Forehand	Freestyle skiing	Men's big air	February 17
Silver	Ethan Cepuran; Casey Dawson; Emery Lehman	Speed skating	Men's team pursuit	February 17
Silver	Ben Ogden; Gus Schumacher	Cross-country skiing	Men's team sprint	February 18
Silver	Jordan Stolz	Speed skating	Men's 1500 m	February 19
Bronze	Paula Moltzan; Jacqueline Wiles	Alpine skiing	Women's team combined	February 10
Bronze	Ashley Farquharson	Luge	Women's singles	February 10
Bronze	Jessie Diggins	Cross-country skiing	Women's 10 km freestyle	February 12
Bronze	Elizabeth Lemley	Freestyle skiing	Women's dual moguls	February 14
Bronze	Kaillie Humphries	Bobsleigh	Women's monobob	February 16
Bronze	Jake Canter	Snowboarding	Men's slopestyle	February 18
Bronze	Corinne Stoddard	Short-track speed skating	Women's 1500 m	February 20
Bronze	Kaillie Humphries; Jasmine Jones	Bobsleigh	Two-woman	February 21
Bronze	Mia Manganello	Speed skating	Women's mass start	February 21

Medals by sport
Sport	1st place, gold medalist(s)	2nd place, silver medalist(s)	3rd place, bronze medalist(s)	Total
Freestyle skiing	3	4	1	**8**
Speed skating	2	2	1	**5**
Alpine skiing	2	1	1	**4**
Figure skating	2	1	0	**3**
Ice hockey	2	0	0	**2**
Bobsleigh	1	0	2	**3**
Cross-country skiing	0	2	1	**3**
Snowboarding	0	1	1	**2**
Curling	0	1	0	**1**
Luge	0	0	1	**1**
Short-track speed skating	0	0	1	**1**
Total	12	12	9	33

Medals by day
Day	Date	1st place, gold medalist(s)	2nd place, silver medalist(s)	3rd place, bronze medalist(s)	Total
1	February 7	0	0	0	**0**
2	February 8	2	0	0	**2**
3	February 9	0	0	0	**0**
4	February 10	0	3	2	**5**
5	February 11	2	3	0	**5**
6	February 12	0	1	1	**2**
7	February 13	0	0	0	**0**
8	February 14	1	1	1	**3**
9	February 15	0	0	0	**0**
10	February 16	1	0	1	**2**
11	February 17	0	2	0	**2**
12	February 18	1	1	1	**3**
13	February 19	2	1	0	**3**
14	February 20	1	0	1	**2**
15	February 21	1	0	2	**3**
16	February 22	1	0	0	**1**
Total		12	12	9	33

Medals by gender
Gender	1st place, gold medalist(s)	2nd place, silver medalist(s)	3rd place, bronze medalist(s)	Total	Percentage
Female	6	3	8	**17**	51.5%
Male	4	7	1	**12**	36.4%
Mixed	2	2	0	**4**	12.1%
Total	12	12	9	33	100%

Multiple medalists
Name	Sport	1st place, gold medalist(s)	2nd place, silver medalist(s)	3rd place, bronze medalist(s)	Total
Jordan Stolz	Speed skating	2	1	0	**3**
Alysa Liu	Figure skating	2	0	0	**2**
Evan Bates	Figure skating	1	1	0	**2**
Madison Chock	Figure skating	1	1	0	**2**
Elizabeth Lemley	Freestyle skiing	1	0	1	**2**
Jaelin Kauf	Freestyle skiing	0	2	0	**2**
Ben Ogden	Cross-country skiing	0	2	0	**2**
Kaillie Humphries	Bobsleigh	0	0	2	**2**

^{a} Athletes that competed in preliminary/qualification rounds but not final round.

== Competitors ==
232 American athletes were named in the official roster announcement by the United States Olympic & Paralympic Committee. The following is the list of the number of competitors participating at the Games per sport/discipline.

Sport	Men	Women	Total
Alpine skiing	6	11	17
Biathlon	4	4	8
Bobsleigh	8	6	14
Cross-country skiing	8	8	16
Curling	6	5	11
Figure skating	8	8	16
Freestyle skiing	16	16	32
Ice hockey	25	23	48
Luge	6	5	11
Nordic combined	2	—N/a	2
Short-track speed skating	3	5	8
Skeleton	2	2	4
Ski jumping	3	3	6
Ski mountaineering	1	1	2
Snowboarding	12	12	24
Speed skating	7	6	13
Total	117	115	232

== Alpine skiing ==
The United States qualified one female and one male alpine skier through the basic quota. As of 28 December 2025, the United States qualified two female and two male alpine skiers by virtue of them being in the top 30 in World Cup standings, and eight female and three male alpine skiers through the additional quota. In total, the United States qualified eleven female and six male alpine skiers at the Games. The team roster was announced on January 21, 2026.

Men

Athlete	Event	Run 1		Run 2		Total	
Athlete	Event	Time	Rank	Time	Rank	Time	Rank
Bryce Bennett	Downhill	—N/a				1:53.45	13
Ryan Cochran-Siegle	Downhill	—N/a				1:53.63	18
Sam Morse	Downhill	—N/a				1:53.68	19
Kyle Negomir	Downhill	—N/a				1:53.20	10
Ryan Cochran-Siegle	Super-G	—N/a				1:25.45	2nd place, silver medalist(s)
Sam Morse	Super-G	—N/a				1:27.12	23
Kyle Negomir	Super-G	—N/a				1:28.62	26
River Radamus	Super-G	—N/a				DNF	
Kyle Negomir	Giant slalom	DNF					
River Radamus	Giant slalom	1:16.38	12	1:11.58	23	2:27.96	17
Ryder Sarchett	Giant slalom	1:18.72	29	1:11.39	20	2:30.11	25
River Radamus	Slalom	DNF					
Kyle Negomir; River Radamus	Team combined	1.53.99	16	53.35	16	2:47.34	19

Women

Athlete	Event	Run 1		Run 2		Total	
Athlete	Event	Time	Rank	Time	Rank	Time	Rank
Breezy Johnson	Downhill	—N/a				1:36.10	1st place, gold medalist(s)
Lindsey Vonn	Downhill	—N/a				DNF	
Jacqueline Wiles	Downhill	—N/a				1:36.96	4
Isabella Wright	Downhill	—N/a				1:38.85	21
Mary Bocock	Super-G	—N/a				DNF	
Keely Cashman	Super-G	—N/a				1:25.61	15
Breezy Johnson	Super-G	—N/a				DNF	
Jacqueline Wiles	Super-G	—N/a				1:25.40	13
AJ Hurt	Giant slalom	DNF					
Paula Moltzan	Giant slalom	1:04.39	13	1:10.38	17	2:14.77	15
Nina O'Brien	Giant slalom	1:05.81	29	1:09.50	1	2:15.31	20
Mikaela Shiffrin	Giant slalom	1:04.25	7	1:10.17	13	2:14.42	11
AJ Hurt	Slalom	49.35	17	53.08	18	1:42.43	19
Paula Moltzan	Slalom	49.90	28	51.39	1	1:41.29	8
Nina O'Brien	Slalom	DNF					
Mikaela Shiffrin	Slalom	47.13	1	51.97	2	1:39.10	1st place, gold medalist(s)
Keely Cashman; AJ Hurt	Team combined	1:39.91	21	44.99	8	2:24.90	15
Breezy Johnson; Mikaela Shiffrin	Team combined	1:36.59	1	45.38	15	2:21.97	4
Paula Moltzan; Jacqueline Wiles	Team combined	1:37.04	4	44.87	4	2:21.91	3rd place, bronze medalist(s)
Nina O'Brien; Isabella Wright	Team combined	DNF					

== Biathlon ==
The United States qualified four female and four male biathletes through the 2024–25 Biathlon World Cup score. The team roster was announced on January 6, 2026.

Men

Athlete	Event	Time	Misses	Rank
Sean Doherty	Sprint	26:12.6	1+2	65
Maxime Germain	Sprint	26:13.4	3+0	66
Paul Schommer	Sprint	25:31.3	1+0	47
Campbell Wright	Sprint	24:03.1	1+0	12
Paul Schommer	Pursuit	36:41.4	1+2+0+1	48
Campbell Wright	Pursuit	32:25.4	2+0+1+0	8
Sean Doherty	Individual	1:02:16.8	1+0+3+2	80
Maxime Germain	Individual	1:00:44.9	0+2+0+1	67
Paul Schommer	Individual	58:00.4	0+0+0+1	44
Campbell Wright	Individual	56:53.9	1+1+0+0	27
Campbell Wright	Mass start	45:14.0	0+1+5+1	29
Sean Doherty; Maxime Germain; Paul Schommer; Campbell Wright	Relay	1:22:22.6	0+8	5

Women

Athlete	Event	Time	Misses	Rank
Lucinda Anderson	Sprint	24:28.7	0+3	79
Margie Freed	Sprint	23:43.2	0+3	66
Deedra Irwin	Sprint	22:59.5	0+0	47
Joanne Reid	Sprint	24:01.9	0+1	72
Deedra Irwin	Pursuit	33:51.5	1+1+2+0	35
Lucinda Anderson	Individual	50:40.8	2+1+1+4	84
Margie Freed	Individual	44:19.9	0+1+0+0	21
Deedra Irwin	Individual	44:57.6	0+1+0+2	34
Joanne Reid	Individual	48:08.7	0+2+0+2	68
Lucinda Anderson; Margie Freed; Deedra Irwin; Joanne Reid	Relay	1:16:49.4	3+13	18

Mixed

Athlete	Event	Time	Misses	Rank
Margie Freed; Maxime Germain; Deedra Irwin; Campbell Wright	Relay	1:07:43.2	1+13	14

== Bobsleigh ==
The United States qualified eight male and six female bobathletes through the world cup races and rankings. The team roster was announced on January 19, 2026.

Men

Athlete	Event	Run 1		Run 2		Run 3		Run 4		Total	
Athlete	Event	Time	Rank	Time	Rank	Time	Rank	Time	Rank	Time	Rank
Frank Del Duca^{D} Josh Williamson	Two-man	55.40	4	55.84	6	55.38	4	55.34	3	3:41.96	4
Frank Del Duca^{D} Boone Niederhofer; Bryan Sosoo; Josh Williamson	Four-man	55.03	14	54.99	9	54.97	=12	55.07	13	3:40.06	12
Caleb Furnell; Kristopher Horn^{D} Hunter Powell; Carsten Vissering	Four-man	54.60	=8	55.01	11	55.22	=17	55.11	14	3:39.94	11

Women

Athlete	Event	Run 1		Run 2		Run 3		Run 4		Total	
Athlete	Event	Time	Rank	Time	Rank	Time	Rank	Time	Rank	Time	Rank
Kaillie Humphries	Monobob	59.78	4	59.65	1	59.08	=1	59.54	3	3:58.05	3rd place, bronze medalist(s)
Kaysha Love	Monobob	59.54	3	1:00.47	15	59.21	5	1:00.05	16	3:59.27	7
Elana Meyers Taylor	Monobob	59.49	2	59.85	4	59.08	=1	59.51	2	3:57.93	1st place, gold medalist(s)
Azaria Hill; Kaysha Love^{D}	Two-woman	57.18	6	57.37	5	57.57	=4	57.59	5	3:49.71	5
Kaillie Humphries^{D} Jasmine Jones	Two-woman	56.92	1	57.24	4	57.57	=4	57.48	3	3:49.21	3rd place, bronze medalist(s)
Elana Meyers Taylor^{D} Jadin O'Brien	Two-woman	57.14	5	57.99	21	57.60	6	57.76	9	3:50.49	=7

^{D} – Indicates the driver of the sled

== Cross-country skiing ==
The United States qualified one female and one male cross-country skier through the basic quota. Following the completion of the 2024–25 FIS Cross-Country World Cup, the United States qualified a further seven female and six male athletes. After reallocation of declined quotas, the United States qualified one more male athlete. The team roster was announced on January 21, 2026.

Distance
Men

Athlete	Event	Classical		Freestyle		Total	
Athlete	Event	Time	Rank	Time	Rank	Time	Rank
John Steel Hagenbuch	10 km freestyle	—N/a		21:41.1	14	—N/a	
Zak Ketterson	10 km freestyle	—N/a		22:28.4	38	—N/a	
Zanden McMullen	10 km freestyle	—N/a		22:17.7	32	—N/a	
Gus Schumacher	10 km freestyle	—N/a		22:30.8	39	—N/a	
Zak Ketterson	20 km skiathlon	25:26.1	42	24:25.5	41	50:23.5	43
Zanden McMullen	20 km skiathlon	24:25.7	27	24:22.4	40	49:26.3	36
Gus Schumacher	20 km skiathlon	24:33.0	31	23:26.3	23	48:27.5	24
Hunter Wonders	20 km skiathlon	24:26.2	28	24:03.6	35	49:02.1	31
Ben Ogden	50 km classical	DNS		—N/a			
Gus Schumacher	50 km classical	2:14:11.6	13	—N/a			
Hunter Wonders	50 km classical	2:23:34.3	35	—N/a			
John Steel Hagenbuch; Zak Ketterson; Ben Ogden; Gus Schumacher	4 × 7.5 km relay	—N/a				1:06:11.8	6

Women

Athlete	Event	Classical		Freestyle		Total	
Athlete	Event	Time	Rank	Time	Rank	Time	Rank
Jessie Diggins	10 km freestyle	—N/a		23:38.9	3rd place, bronze medalist(s)	—N/a	
Kendall Kramer	10 km freestyle	—N/a		25:34.9	38	—N/a	
Novie McCabe	10 km freestyle	—N/a		25:12.8	31	—N/a	
Hailey Swirbul	10 km freestyle	—N/a		25:45.3	39	—N/a	
Rosie Brennan	20 km skiathlon	28:53.4	16	30:38.4	49	1:00:06.0	37
Jessie Diggins	20 km skiathlon	28:52.8	15	26:39.1	3	56:06.3	8
Julia Kern	20 km skiathlon	29:06.2	24	28:27.2	27	58:02.4	24
Novie McCabe	20 km skiathlon	29:43.5	31	27:46.5	15	58:06.1	26
Rosie Brennan	50 km classical	2:29:30.8	15	—N/a			
Jessie Diggins	50 km classical	2:23:14.6	5	—N/a			
Kendall Kramer	50 km classical	2:35:00.4	26	—N/a			
Hailey Swirbul	50 km classical	2:32:09.7	19	—N/a			
Rosie Brennan; Jessie Diggins; Julia Kern; Novie McCabe	4 × 7.5 km relay	—N/a				1:17:37.0	5

Sprint
Men

Athlete	Event	Qualification		Quarterfinal		Semifinal		Final	
Athlete	Event	Time	Rank	Time	Rank	Time	Rank	Time	Rank
Zak Ketterson	Sprint	3:18.14	23 Q	3:53.33	6	Did not advance			28
Ben Ogden	Sprint	3:09.88	2 Q	3:26.10	1 Q	3:40.32	3 q	3:40.61	2nd place, silver medalist(s)
JC Schoonmaker	Sprint	3:18.38	28 Q	3:32.07	2 Q	3:43.16	4	Did not advance	8
Gus Schumacher	Sprint	3:18.87	31	Did not advance					
Ben Ogden; Gus Schumacher	Team sprint	5:45.72	1 Q	—N/a				18:30.35	2nd place, silver medalist(s)

Women

Athlete	Event	Qualification		Quarterfinal		Semifinal		Final	
Athlete	Event	Time	Rank	Time	Rank	Time	Rank	Time	Rank
Jessie Diggins	Sprint	3:46.67	20 Q	3:59.33	4	Did not advance			17
Lauren Jortberg	Sprint	3:49.23	30 Q	4:00.89	6	Did not advance			30
Julia Kern	Sprint	3:48.77	28 Q	3:56.32	3 q	4:12.32	4 q	4:43.4	6
Sammy Smith	Sprint	3:47.97	26 Q	3:59.07	4	Did not advance			19
Jessie Diggins; Julia Kern	Team sprint	6:49.43	7 Q	—N/a				20:41.53	5

Qualification legend: Q – Qualify based on position in heat; q – Qualify based on time in field

== Curling ==
Summary

Team	Event	Group stage										Semifinal	Final / BM	
Team	Event	Opposition Score	Opposition Score	Opposition Score	Opposition Score	Opposition Score	Opposition Score	Opposition Score	Opposition Score	Opposition Score	Rank	Opposition Score	Opposition Score	Rank
Daniel Casper (S); Aidan Oldenburg; Ben Richardson; Rich Ruohonen; Luc Violette	Men's tournament	CZE; W 8–7	SUI; L 3–8	CAN; L 3–6	GER; W 8–6	SWE; W 8–5	NOR; W 10–8	CHN; L 5–8	ITA; L 5–8	GBR; L 2–9	5	Did not advance		
Taylor Anderson-Heide; Aileen Geving; Tabitha Peterson (S); Tara Peterson; Cory Thiesse	Women's tournament	KOR; W 8–4	SWE; L 4–9	CAN; W 9–8	JPN; W 7–4	CHN; W 6–5	ITA; L 2–7	DEN; W 10–3	GBR; L 7–8	SUI; W 7–6	2 Q	SUI; L 4–7	CAN; L 7–10	4
Korey Dropkin; Cory Thiesse	Mixed doubles tournament	NOR; W 8–6	SUI; W 7–4	CAN; W 7–5	CZE; W 8–1	GBR; L 4–6	KOR; L 5–6	EST; W 5–3	SWE; W 8–7	ITA; L 6–7	3 Q	ITA; W 9–8	SWE; L 5–6	2nd place, silver medalist(s)

=== Men's tournament ===
The United States qualified a men's team by winning the Olympic Qualification Event. Team Daniel Casper qualified as American representatives by winning the 2025 United States Olympic Curling Trials, defeating Team John Shuster 2–1 in the best-of-three final.

Final Round Robin Standings
Team	Skip	Pld	W	L	W–L	PF	PA	EW	EL	BE	SE	S%	DSC	Qualification
Switzerland	Yannick Schwaller	9	9	0	–	75	40	42	30	3	8	88.7%	9.506	Playoffs
Canada	Brad Jacobs	9	7	2	–	63	45	40	28	8	13	86.5%	28.844	Playoffs
Norway	Magnus Ramsfjell	9	5	4	1–0	60	61	37	38	6	7	80.8%	26.938	Playoffs
Great Britain	Bruce Mouat	9	5	4	0–1	63	48	39	33	2	10	86.4%	16.613	Playoffs
United States	Daniel Casper	9	4	5	1–1	52	65	34	37	5	3	81.7%	17.663	
Italy	Joël Retornaz	9	4	5	1–1	58	67	33	39	6	7	83.0%	17.869	
Germany	Marc Muskatewitz	9	4	5	1–1	51	57	36	37	8	7	84.4%	24.850	
Czech Republic	Lukáš Klíma	9	3	6	–	54	63	35	41	3	5	79.8%	29.013	
Sweden	Niklas Edin	9	2	7	1–0	44	63	31	39	6	3	82.5%	26.000	
China	Xu Xiaoming	9	2	7	0–1	52	63	35	40	3	5	81.4%	34.875	

Source: Official website

Round robin
The United States had a bye in draws 4, 8 and 12.

Draw 1
Wednesday, 11 February, 19:05

Sheet C	1	2	3	4	5	6	7	8	9	10	Final
Czech Republic (Klíma)	0	0	1	0	3	0	1	0	2	0	7
United States (Casper) 🔨	0	1	0	1	0	2	0	3	0	1	8

Draw 2
Thursday, 12 February, 14:05

Sheet B	1	2	3	4	5	6	7	8	9	10	Final
United States (Casper)	0	1	0	0	1	0	0	1	X	X	3
Switzerland (Schwaller) 🔨	1	0	0	2	0	3	2	0	X	X	8

Draw 3
Friday, 13 February, 9:05

Sheet A	1	2	3	4	5	6	7	8	9	10	Final
Canada (Jacobs) 🔨	1	0	0	2	0	1	0	2	0	X	6
United States (Casper)	0	1	0	0	1	0	0	0	1	X	3

Draw 5
Saturday, 14 February, 14:05

Sheet D	1	2	3	4	5	6	7	8	9	10	Final
Germany (Muskatewitz)	0	1	1	0	1	1	0	2	0	X	6
United States (Casper) 🔨	4	0	0	2	0	0	1	0	1	X	8

Draw 6
Sunday, 15 February, 9:05

Sheet A	1	2	3	4	5	6	7	8	9	10	Final
United States (Casper)	0	1	0	3	0	1	1	0	2	X	8
Sweden (Edin) 🔨	1	0	1	0	1	0	0	2	0	X	5

Draw 7
Sunday, 15 February, 19:05

Sheet B	1	2	3	4	5	6	7	8	9	10	Final
Norway (Ramsfjell)	0	0	0	1	2	0	2	0	3	0	8
United States (Casper) 🔨	1	2	2	0	0	2	0	1	0	2	10

Draw 9
Tuesday, 17 February, 9:05

Sheet C	1	2	3	4	5	6	7	8	9	10	Final
United States (Casper) 🔨	0	1	0	1	0	0	0	0	3	0	5
China (Xu)	0	0	1	0	0	1	0	3	0	3	8

Draw 10
Tuesday, 17 February, 19:05

Sheet B	1	2	3	4	5	6	7	8	9	10	Final
United States (Casper) 🔨	1	0	1	0	0	0	2	0	1	0	5
Italy (Retornaz)	0	2	0	0	0	3	0	2	0	1	8

Draw 11
Wednesday, 18 February, 14:05

Sheet D	1	2	3	4	5	6	7	8	9	10	Final
United States (Casper) 🔨	0	0	0	0	2	0	X	X	X	X	2
Great Britain (Mouat)	1	1	4	0	0	3	X	X	X	X	9

=== Women's tournament ===
The United States qualified a women's team by finishing second at the Olympic Qualification Event. Team Tabitha Peterson qualified as American representatives by winning the 2025 United States Olympic Curling Trials, defeating Team Elizabeth Cousins 2–0 in the best-of-three final.

Final Round Robin Standings
Team	Skip	Pld	W	L	W–L	PF	PA	EW	EL	BE	SE	S%	DSC	Qualification
Sweden	Anna Hasselborg	9	7	2	–	65	50	45	32	5	14	81.7%	25.806	Playoffs
United States	Tabitha Peterson	9	6	3	2–0	60	54	40	37	3	13	82.1%	34.288	Playoffs
Switzerland	Silvana Tirinzoni	9	6	3	1–1	60	51	35	42	6	4	85.0%	44.338	Playoffs
Canada	Rachel Homan	9	6	3	0–2	76	59	45	38	2	9	80.3%	19.781	Playoffs
South Korea	Gim Eun-ji	9	5	4	1–0	60	53	37	35	8	11	81.2%	23.581	
Great Britain	Sophie Jackson	9	5	4	0–1	58	58	36	36	10	8	83.4%	16.938	
Denmark	Madeleine Dupont	9	4	5	–	49	58	36	38	3	11	77.0%	37.875	
Japan	Sayaka Yoshimura	9	2	7	1–1	51	69	35	43	3	6	78.6%	27.513	
Italy	Stefania Constantini	9	2	7	1–1	47	60	34	40	3	4	78.8%	34.719	
China	Wang Rui	9	2	7	1–1	56	70	37	39	3	9	82.7%	41.206	

Source: Official website

Round robin
The United States had a bye in draws 4, 7 and 11.

Draw 1
Thursday, 12 February, 9:05

Sheet A	1	2	3	4	5	6	7	8	9	10	Final
South Korea (Gim) 🔨	0	1	1	0	0	0	0	2	0	0	4
United States (Peterson)	0	0	0	2	0	1	2	0	1	2	8

Draw 2
Thursday, 12 February, 19:05

Sheet D	1	2	3	4	5	6	7	8	9	10	Final
Sweden (Hasselborg) 🔨	0	1	0	0	2	1	0	1	1	3	9
United States (Peterson)	0	0	1	1	0	0	2	0	0	0	4

Draw 3
Friday, 13 February, 14:05

Sheet C	1	2	3	4	5	6	7	8	9	10	Final
United States (Peterson)	0	0	1	1	0	4	0	1	0	2	9
Canada (Homan) 🔨	0	2	0	0	1	0	2	0	3	0	8

Draw 5
Saturday, 14 February, 19:05

Sheet B	1	2	3	4	5	6	7	8	9	10	Final
Japan (Yoshimura) 🔨	0	1	0	2	0	0	0	0	1	X	4
United States (Peterson)	0	0	2	0	1	1	0	3	0	X	7

Draw 6
Sunday, 15 February, 14:05

Sheet D	1	2	3	4	5	6	7	8	9	10	Final
United States (Peterson)	0	0	1	0	0	2	0	1	1	1	6
China (Wang) 🔨	0	2	0	1	1	0	1	0	0	0	5

Draw 8
Monday, 16 February, 19:05

Sheet A	1	2	3	4	5	6	7	8	9	10	Final
United States (Peterson) 🔨	0	0	0	0	0	1	0	1	0	X	2
Italy (Constantini)	0	0	1	2	1	0	1	0	2	X	7

Draw 9
Tuesday, 17 February, 14:05

Sheet C	1	2	3	4	5	6	7	8	9	10	Final
Denmark (Dupont)	0	1	0	1	0	0	1	0	X	X	3
United States (Peterson) 🔨	1	0	2	0	1	2	0	4	X	X	10

Draw 10
Wednesday, 18 February, 9:05

Sheet B	1	2	3	4	5	6	7	8	9	10	Final
United States (Peterson) 🔨	1	0	0	1	1	0	3	1	0	0	7
Great Britain (Jackson)	0	1	1	0	0	2	0	0	2	2	8

Draw 12
Thursday, 19 February, 14:30

Sheet A	1	2	3	4	5	6	7	8	9	10	11	Final
Switzerland (Tirinzoni)	0	0	1	0	0	1	0	1	0	3	0	6
United States (Peterson) 🔨	0	1	0	1	1	0	2	0	1	0	1	7

Semifinal
Friday, 20 February, 14:05

Sheet D	1	2	3	4	5	6	7	8	9	10	Final
United States (Peterson) 🔨	1	0	1	0	1	0	0	0	1	0	4
Switzerland (Tirinzoni)	0	2	0	2	0	0	0	1	0	2	7

Bronze medal game

Saturday, 21 February, 14:05

Sheet C	1	2	3	4	5	6	7	8	9	10	Final
Canada (Homan)	0	1	0	1	0	3	0	3	0	2	10
United States (Peterson) 🔨	1	0	1	0	1	0	2	0	2	0	7

=== Mixed doubles tournament ===
The United States qualified a mixed doubles team by finishing in the top seven based on the combined points at the 2024 and 2025 World Championships. Cory Thiesse and Korey Dropkin qualified as American representatives by winning the 2025 United States Mixed Doubles Curling Olympic Trials.

Final Round Robin Standings
Team	Athletes	Pld	W	L	W–L	PF	PA	EW	EL	BE	SE	S%	DSC	Qualification
Great Britain	Jennifer Dodds / Bruce Mouat	9	8	1	–	69	46	37	30	0	11	79.6%	20.931	Playoffs
Italy	Stefania Constantini / Amos Mosaner	9	6	3	1–0	60	50	32	31	1	11	78.3%	27.931	Playoffs
United States	Cory Thiesse / Korey Dropkin	9	6	3	0–1	58	45	36	33	0	12	83.1%	25.900	Playoffs
Sweden	Isabella Wranå / Rasmus Wranå	9	5	4	–	62	55	31	34	0	9	80.1%	19.413	Playoffs
Canada	Jocelyn Peterman / Brett Gallant	9	4	5	2–0	58	52	35	31	0	10	78.5%	36.050	
Norway	Kristin Skaslien / Magnus Nedregotten	9	4	5	1–1	52	47	37	33	0	12	77.1%	24.444	
Switzerland	Briar Schwaller-Hürlimann / Yannick Schwaller	9	4	5	0–2	56	67	32	35	0	6	74.5%	24.000	
Czech Republic	Julie Zelingrová / Vít Chabičovský	9	3	6	1–0	45	62	30	34	0	6	69.1%	16.019	
South Korea	Kim Seon-yeong / Jeong Yeong-seok	9	3	6	0–1	47	64	32	34	0	9	75.1%	42.425	
Estonia	Marie Kaldvee / Harri Lill	9	2	7	–	46	65	32	39	0	7	71.6%	19.300	

Source: Official website

Round robin
The United States had a bye in draws 1, 4, 7, and 10.

Draw 2
Thursday, 5 February, 10:05

Sheet C	1	2	3	4	5	6	7	8	Final
Norway (Skaslien / Nedregotten)	0	3	0	2	0	1	0	0	6
United States (Thiesse / Dropkin) 🔨	1	0	2	0	1	0	2	2	8

Draw 3
Thursday, 5 February, 14:35

Sheet A	1	2	3	4	5	6	7	8	Final
United States (Thiesse / Dropkin)	1	0	2	2	0	2	0	X	7
Switzerland (Schwaller-Hürlimann / Schwaller) 🔨	0	2	0	0	1	0	1	X	4

Draw 5
Friday, 6 February, 10:05

Sheet D	1	2	3	4	5	6	7	8	Final
United States (Thiesse / Dropkin) 🔨	0	2	1	0	1	0	3	0	7
Canada (Peterman / Gallant)	1	0	0	2	0	1	0	1	5

Draw 6
Friday, 6 February, 14:35

Sheet A	1	2	3	4	5	6	7	8	Final
Czech Republic (Zelingrová / Chabičovský) 🔨	0	0	0	1	0	0	X	X	1
United States (Thiesse / Dropkin)	1	3	1	0	1	2	X	X	8

Draw 8
Saturday, 7 February, 14:35

Sheet D	1	2	3	4	5	6	7	8	Final
Great Britain (Dodds / Mouat) 🔨	2	1	0	1	0	1	1	X	6
United States (Thiesse / Dropkin)	0	0	1	0	3	0	0	X	4

Draw 9
Saturday, 7 February, 19:05

Sheet A	1	2	3	4	5	6	7	8	9	Final
South Korea (Kim / Jeong) 🔨	1	1	0	1	0	1	1	0	1	6
United States (Thiesse / Dropkin)	0	0	1	0	1	0	0	3	0	5

Draw 11
Sunday, 8 February, 14:35

Sheet C	1	2	3	4	5	6	7	8	Final
United States (Thiesse / Dropkin)	0	1	0	1	0	1	1	1	5
Estonia (Kaldvee / Lill) 🔨	1	0	1	0	1	0	0	0	3

Draw 12
Sunday, 8 February, 19:05

Sheet B	1	2	3	4	5	6	7	8	Final
Sweden (Wranå / Wranå) 🔨	3	0	1	0	0	2	1	0	7
United States (Thiesse / Dropkin)	0	3	0	3	1	0	0	1	8

Draw 13
Monday, 9 February, 10:05

Sheet B	1	2	3	4	5	6	7	8	Final
United States (Thiesse / Dropkin) 🔨	1	0	0	1	0	2	2	0	6
Italy (Constantini / Mosaner)	0	1	1	0	4	0	0	1	7

Semifinal
Monday, 9 February, 18:05

Sheet D	1	2	3	4	5	6	7	8	Final
Italy (Constantini / Mosaner) 🔨	2	0	2	0	1	0	3	0	8
United States (Thiesse / Dropkin)	0	2	0	3	0	2	0	2	9

Gold medal game
Tuesday, 10 February, 18:05

Sheet C	1	2	3	4	5	6	7	8	Final
Sweden (Wranå / Wranå)	0	2	0	1	0	1	0	2	6
United States (Thiesse / Dropkin) 🔨	1	0	1	0	1	0	2	0	5

== Figure skating ==
At the 2025 World Figure Skating Championships in Boston, the United States secured three quota places in men's singles, three quota places in women's singles, two quota places in pair skating (with the possibility of earning a third quota place at the Beijing Qualifying Competition), and three quota places in ice dance. Furthermore, the United States qualified for the team event.

The 2026 U.S. Championships served as the final qualifying event prior to the selection of the U.S. Olympic Figure Skating Team that would represent Team USA at the Games. Ilia Malinin, Maxim Naumov and Andrew Torgashev were selected for the men's singles event. Amber Glenn, Isabeau Levito and Alysa Liu were selected for the women's singles event. Christina Carreira & Anthony Ponomarenko, Madison Chock & Evan Bates and Emilea Zingas & Vadym Kolesnik were selected for the ice dance event.

Alisa Efimova and Misha Mitrofanov won the national pairs title for a second consecutive time at the 2026 U.S. Championships. Due to Efimova not yet having American citizenship, the pair were not eligible for the Winter Olympic team. Emily Chan & Spencer Howe and Ellie Kam & Daniel O'Shea, who finished in 4th place and won silver respectively, were selected instead.

Individual

Athlete	Event	SP		FS		Total	
Athlete	Event	Points	Rank	Points	Rank	Points	Rank
Ilia Malinin	Men's singles	108.16	1 Q	156.33	15	264.49	8
Maxim Naumov	Men's singles	85.65	14 Q	137.71	22	223.36	20
Andrew Torgashev	Men's singles	88.94	8 Q	170.12	9	259.06	12
Amber Glenn	Women's singles	67.39	13 Q	147.25	3	214.91	5
Isabeau Levito	Women's singles	70.84	8 Q	131.96	13	202.80	12
Alysa Liu	Women's singles	76.59	3 Q	150.20	1	226.79	1st place, gold medalist(s)

Mixed

Athlete	Event	SP / RD		FS / FD		Total	
Athlete	Event	Points	Rank	Points	Rank	Points	Rank
Emily Chan; Spencer Howe	Pairs	70.06	9 Q	130.25	7	200.31	7
Ellie Kam; Daniel O'Shea	Pairs	71.87	7 Q	122.71	12	194.58	9
Christina Carreira; Anthony Ponomarenko	Ice dance	78.15	11 Q	119.47	10	197.62	11
Madison Chock; Evan Bates	Ice dance	89.72	2 Q	134.67	2	224.39	2nd place, silver medalist(s)
Emilea Zingas; Vadym Kolesnik	Ice dance	83.53	6 Q	123.19	5	206.72	5

Team

Athlete	Event	Short program / Rhythm dance						Free skate / Free dance				Total	
Athlete	Event	Men's	Women's	Pairs	Ice dance	Total		Men's	Women's	Pairs	Ice dance	Total	
Athlete	Event	Points Team points	Points Team points	Points Team points	Points Team points	Points	Rank	Points Team points	Points Team points	Points Team points	Points Team points	Points	Rank
Ilia Malinin (M); Alysa Liu (W) (SP); Amber Glenn (W) (FS); Ellie Kam / Daniel O'Shea (P); Madison Chock / Evan Bates (ID)	Team event	98.00; 9	74.90; 9	66.59; 6	91.06; 10	34	1 Q	200.03; 10	138.62; 8	135.36; 7	133.23; 10	69	1st place, gold medalist(s)

== Freestyle skiing ==
The United States qualified an athlete in each event (sixteen male and sixteen female) through the World Cup and 2025 World Championship event. The United States also qualified for the mixed team aerials event. The team roster was announced on January 21, 2026.

Quinn Dehlinger withdrew due to an injury.

Aerials
Men

Athlete	Event	Qualification					Final 1			Final 2	
Athlete	Event	Jump 1		Jump 2			Final 1			Final 2	
Athlete	Event	Score	Rank	Score	Best	Rank	Jump 1	Jump 2	Rank	Score	Rank
Connor Curran	Aerials	117.26	5 Q	Bye			88.69	~~86.73~~	12	Did not advance	
Quinn Dehlinger	Aerials	DNS					Did not advance				
Derek Krueger	Aerials	111.95	7	79.18	111.95	10 Q	~~76.99~~	92.74	11	Did not advance	
Christopher Lillis	Aerials	106.20	10	111.76	111.76	11 Q	~~86.73~~	102.71	8	Did not advance	

Women

Athlete	Event	Qualification					Final 1			Final 2	
Athlete	Event	Jump 1		Jump 2			Final 1			Final 2	
Athlete	Event	Score	Rank	Score	Best	Rank	Jump 1	Jump 2	Rank	Score	Rank
Kyra Dossa	Aerials	53.55	23	75.98	75.98	14	Did not advance				
Kaila Kuhn	Aerials	89.29	6 Q	Bye			~~87.00~~	109.90	3 Q	99.16	5
Tasia Tanner	Aerials	80.01	12	78.01	80.01	12 Q	85.36	~~80.62~~	11	Did not advance	
Winter Vinecki	Aerials	87.57	9	84.99	87.57	10 Q	~~99.89~~	107.75	5 Q	90.58	6

Mixed

Athlete	Event	Jump 1		Jump 2	
Athlete	Event	Score	Rank	Score	Rank
Connor Curran; Kaila Kuhn; Christopher Lillis	Team aerials	351.23	1 Q	325.25	1st place, gold medalist(s)

Freeskiing
Men

Athlete	Event	Qualification					Final				
Athlete	Event	Run 1	Run 2	Run 3	Best	Rank	Run 1	Run 2	Run 3	Best	Rank
Mac Forehand	Big air	93.25	89.75	DNI	183.00	1 Q	95.00	95.00	98.25	193.25	2nd place, silver medalist(s)
Alex Hall	Big air	43.25	84.00	12.50	96.50	26	Did not advance				
Troy Podmilsak	Big air	89.00	85.00	DNI	174.00	10 Q	90.50	73.75	94.00	184.50	4
Konnor Ralph	Big air	86.75	25.75	85.00	171.75	12 Q	86.50	16.75	91.50	178.00	5
Alex Ferreira	Halfpipe	85.75	DNI	—N/a	85.75	4 Q	49.50	90.50	93.75	93.75	1st place, gold medalist(s)
Nick Goepper	Halfpipe	90.00	DNI	—N/a	90.00	2 Q	29.25	89.00	DNI	89.00	4
Hunter Hess	Halfpipe	82.75	85.00	—N/a	85.00	5 Q	27.25	DNI	58.75	58.75	10
Birk Irving	Halfpipe	84.25	DNI	—N/a	84.25	6 Q	33.00	87.50	88.00	88.00	5
Mac Forehand	Slopestyle	44.68	73.96	—N/a	73.96	6 Q	1.25	55.93	15.61	55.93	11
Alex Hall	Slopestyle	71.63	68.98	—N/a	71.63	8 Q	52.65	85.75	8.03	85.75	2nd place, silver medalist(s)
Troy Podmilsak	Slopestyle	30.90	29.81	—N/a	30.90	28	Did not advance				
Konnor Ralph	Slopestyle	68.91	50.15	—N/a	68.91	10 Q	36.20	66.76	35.90	66.76	9

Women

Athlete	Event	Qualification					Final				
Athlete	Event	Run 1	Run 2	Run 3	Best	Rank	Run 1	Run 2	Run 3	Best	Rank
Marin Hamill	Big air	48.50	65.25	50.25	115.50	22	Did not advance				
Rell Harwood	Big air	11.25	54.25	47.00	101.25	23	Did not advance				
Grace Henderson	Big air	86.75	52.50	DNI	139.25	14	Did not advance				
Avery Krumme	Big air	78.00	32.25	47.00	125.00	19	Did not advance				
Kate Gray	Halfpipe	5.25	74.75	—N/a	74.75	12 Q	44.50	DNI	66.50	66.50	10
Svea Irving	Halfpipe	77.75	80.75	—N/a	80.75	8 Q	17.25	DNS	22.50	22.50	11
Riley Jacobs	Halfpipe	56.50	DNI	—N/a	56.50	18	Did not advance				
Abby Winterberger	Halfpipe	72.25	72.50	—N/a	72.50	15	Did not advance				
Marin Hamill	Slopestyle	47.91	30.91	—N/a	47.91	16	Did not advance				
Rell Harwood	Slopestyle	DNS		—N/a	DNS		Did not advance				
Grace Henderson	Slopestyle	0.60	49.78	—N/a	49.78	15	Did not advance				
Avery Krumme	Slopestyle	47.43	64.93	—N/a	64.93	4 Q	52.40	29.96	0.86	52.40	11

Moguls
Men

Athlete	Event	Qualification								Final							
Athlete	Event	Run 1				Run 2				Run 1				Run 2			
Athlete	Event	Time	Points	Total	Rank	Time	Points	Total	Rank	Time	Points	Total	Rank	Time	Points	Total	Rank
Charlie Mickel	Moguls	23.57	59.03	75.31	11	22.78	60.48	77.82	13 Q	22.75	60.65	78.03	12	Did not advance			
Nick Page	Moguls	23.63	61.30	77.50	5 Q	Bye				22.77	62.73	80.08	6 Q	22.30	57.01	75.00	7
Dylan Walczyk	Moguls	23.21	59.91	76.67	7 Q	Bye				22.65	56.1	77.62	13	Did not advance			
Landon Wendler	Moguls	23.63	58.88	75.08	12	23.16	59.51	76.34	17 Q	22.52	52.51	70.20	17	Did not advance			

Women

Athlete	Event	Qualification								Final							
Athlete	Event	Run 1				Run 2				Run 1				Run 2			
Athlete	Event	Time	Points	Total	Rank	Time	Points	Total	Rank	Time	Points	Total	Rank	Time	Points	Total	Rank
Olivia Giaccio	Moguls	26.17	63.51	80.74	3 Q	Bye				25.73	58.06	75.81	9	Did not advance			
Tess Johnson	Moguls	27.36	57.96	73.79	9 Q	Bye				26.57	58.55	75.31	10	Did not advance			
Jaelin Kauf	Moguls	24.88	34.63	53.38	27	26.35	60.16	77.18	12 Q	24.96	61.48	80.13	2 Q	25.11	65.29	80.77	2nd place, silver medalist(s)
Elizabeth Lemley	Moguls	26.67	64.31	80.95	2 Q	Bye				26.49	62.17	79.02	4 Q	25.81	64.65	82.30	1st place, gold medalist(s)

Dual moguls
Men

Athlete	Event	Round of 32	Round of 16	Quarterfinal	Semifinal	Final / BM	
Athlete	Event	Opposition Result	Opposition Result	Opposition Result	Opposition Result	Opposition Result	Rank
Charlie Mickel	Dual moguls	Wendler (USA); W 23–12	Woods (AUS); W 32–3	Graham (AUS); L 15–20	Did not advance		6
Nick Page	Dual moguls	Karjalainen (FIN); W 22–13	Horishima (JPN); L DNF–35	Did not advance			15
Dylan Walczyk	Dual moguls	Lee (KOR); W 23–12	Murphy (AUS); W 35–DNF	Horishima (JPN); L 9–26	Did not advance		7
Landon Wendler	Dual moguls	Mickel (USA); L 12–23	Did not advance				26

Women

Athlete	Event	Round of 32	Round of 16	Quarterfinal	Semifinal	Final / BM	
Athlete	Event	Opposition Result	Opposition Result	Opposition Result	Opposition Result	Opposition Result	Rank
Olivia Giaccio	Dual moguls	Passaretta (ITA); W 35–DNF	Carroll (AUT); W 20.5–14.5	Anthony (AUS); L 15–20	Did not advance		6
Tess Johnson	Dual moguls	Desmarais-Gilbert (CAN); W 22–13	Fujiki (JPN); W 20–15	Laffont (FRA); L 17–18	Did not advance		5
Jaelin Kauf	Dual moguls	Bye	Bosco (AUS); W 29–6	Gorodko (KAZ); W 35–DNF	Laffont (FRA); W 35–DNF	Anthony (AUS); L 15–20	2nd place, silver medalist(s)
Elizabeth Lemley	Dual moguls	Bye	Koehler (CAN); W 25–10	Tomitaka (JPN); W 35–DNF	Anthony (AUS); L DNF–35	Bronze medal final Laffont (FRA); W 18–17	3rd place, bronze medalist(s)

== Ice hockey ==
Summary
Key:

- OT – Overtime
- GWS – Match decided by penalty-shootout

Team	Event	Group stage					Qualification playoff	Quarterfinal	Semifinal	Final / BM	
Team	Event	Opposition Score	Opposition Score	Opposition Score	Opposition Score	Rank	Opposition Score	Opposition Score	Opposition Score	Opposition Score	Rank
United States men's	Men's tournament	Latvia; W 5–1	Denmark; W 6–3	Germany; W 5–1	—N/a	1 QQ	Bye	Sweden; W 2–1 OT	Slovakia; W 6–2	Canada; W 2–1 OT	1st place, gold medalist(s)
United States women's	Women's tournament	Czechia; W 5–1	Finland; W 5–0	Switzerland; W 5–0	Canada; W 5–0	1 Q	—N/a	Italy; W 6–0	Sweden; W 5–0	Canada; W 2–1 OT	1st place, gold medalist(s)

=== Men's tournament ===
The United States men's national ice hockey team qualified a team of 25 players by finishing fourth in the 2023 IIHF World Ranking.

Roster
The first six players of the United States' roster were announced on 16 June 2025. The remainder of the roster was revealed on 2 January 2026. On 21 January, defenseman Seth Jones was ruled out due to injury, and was replaced by Jackson LaCombe. On 8 February, Auston Matthews was named captain, with Charlie McAvoy and Matthew Tkachuk serving as alternate captains.

Head coach: Mike Sullivan

No.	Pos.	Name	Height	Weight	Birthdate	Team
1	G	Jeremy Swayman	1.91 m (6 ft 3 in)	88 kg (194 lb)	24 November 1998 (aged 27)	(United States) Boston Bruins
2	D	Jackson LaCombe	1.88 m (6 ft 2 in)	93 kg (205 lb)	9 January 2001 (aged 25)	(United States) Anaheim Ducks
7	F	Brady Tkachuk	1.93 m (6 ft 4 in)	102 kg (225 lb)	16 September 1999 (aged 26)	(Canada) Ottawa Senators
8	D	Zach Werenski	1.88 m (6 ft 2 in)	98 kg (216 lb)	19 July 1997 (aged 28)	(United States) Columbus Blue Jackets
9	F	Jack Eichel	1.88 m (6 ft 2 in)	94 kg (207 lb)	28 October 1996 (aged 29)	(United States) Vegas Golden Knights
10	F	J. T. Miller	1.85 m (6 ft 1 in)	95 kg (209 lb)	14 March 1993 (aged 32)	(United States) New York Rangers
12	F	Matt Boldy	1.88 m (6 ft 2 in)	91 kg (201 lb)	5 April 2001 (aged 24)	(United States) Minnesota Wild
14	D	Brock Faber	1.85 m (6 ft 1 in)	91 kg (201 lb)	22 August 2002 (aged 23)	(United States) Minnesota Wild
15	D	Noah Hanifin	1.91 m (6 ft 3 in)	93 kg (205 lb)	25 January 1997 (aged 29)	(United States) Vegas Golden Knights
16	F	Vincent Trocheck	1.80 m (5 ft 11 in)	85 kg (187 lb)	11 July 1993 (aged 32)	(United States) New York Rangers
19	F	Matthew Tkachuk – A	1.88 m (6 ft 2 in)	91 kg (201 lb)	11 December 1997 (aged 28)	(United States) Florida Panthers
21	F	Dylan Larkin	1.85 m (6 ft 1 in)	93 kg (205 lb)	30 July 1996 (aged 29)	(United States) Detroit Red Wings
25	D	Charlie McAvoy – A	1.85 m (6 ft 1 in)	95 kg (209 lb)	21 December 1997 (aged 28)	(United States) Boston Bruins
29	F	Brock Nelson	1.93 m (6 ft 4 in)	93 kg (205 lb)	15 October 1991 (aged 34)	(United States) Colorado Avalanche
30	G	Jake Oettinger	1.98 m (6 ft 6 in)	102 kg (225 lb)	18 December 1998 (aged 27)	(United States) Dallas Stars
34	F	Auston Matthews – C	1.91 m (6 ft 3 in)	98 kg (216 lb)	17 September 1997 (aged 28)	(Canada) Toronto Maple Leafs
37	G	Connor Hellebuyck	1.93 m (6 ft 4 in)	94 kg (207 lb)	19 May 1993 (aged 32)	(Canada) Winnipeg Jets
43	D	Quinn Hughes	1.78 m (5 ft 10 in)	82 kg (181 lb)	14 October 1999 (aged 26)	(United States) Minnesota Wild
59	F	Jake Guentzel	1.80 m (5 ft 11 in)	82 kg (181 lb)	6 October 1994 (aged 31)	(United States) Tampa Bay Lightning
72	F	Tage Thompson	1.98 m (6 ft 6 in)	100 kg (220 lb)	30 October 1997 (aged 28)	(United States) Buffalo Sabres
74	D	Jaccob Slavin	1.91 m (6 ft 3 in)	94 kg (207 lb)	1 May 1994 (aged 31)	(United States) Carolina Hurricanes
81	F	Kyle Connor	1.85 m (6 ft 1 in)	83 kg (183 lb)	9 December 1996 (aged 29)	(Canada) Winnipeg Jets
85	D	Jake Sanderson	1.88 m (6 ft 2 in)	92 kg (203 lb)	8 July 2002 (aged 23)	(Canada) Ottawa Senators
86	F	Jack Hughes	1.80 m (5 ft 11 in)	80 kg (176 lb)	14 May 2001 (aged 24)	(United States) New Jersey Devils
91	F	Clayton Keller	1.78 m (5 ft 10 in)	79 kg (174 lb)	29 July 1998 (aged 27)	(United States) Utah Mammoth

Group play

Pos	Team	Pld	W	OTW	OTL	L	GF	GA	GD	Pts	Qualification
1	United States	3	3	0	0	0	16	5	+11	9	Advance to quarterfinals
2	Germany	3	1	0	0	2	7	10	−3	3 (Note: Head-to-head points: 3 each. Head-to-head goal difference: Germany +1; Denmark 0; Latvia −1.)	Advance to qualification playoffs
3	Denmark	3	1	0	0	2	8	11	−3	3	Advance to qualification playoffs
4	Latvia	3	1	0	0	2	7	12	−5	3	Advance to qualification playoffs

Source: IIHF
Rules for classification: Tiebreak criteria
Notes:

12 February 2026; 21:10	Latvia	1–5 (1–1, 0–3, 0–1)	United States	PalaItalia, Milan; Attendance: 11,288

Game reference

Elvis Merzļikins
Artūrs Šilovs
Goalies
Connor Hellebuyck
Referees:
(Canada) Michael Campbell
(United States) Kyle Rehman
Linesmen:
(Denmark) Albert Ankerstjerne
(Czech Republic) Libor Suchánek

	0–1	05:29 – B. Tkachuk (M. Tkachuk, Werenski)
Krastenbergs (Girgensons) – 07:25	1–1
	1–2	30:38 – Nelson (J. Hughes, Trocheck)
	1–3	37:35 – Thompson (Eichel, Q. Hughes) (PP)
	1–4	39:48 – Nelson (J. Hughes, M. Tkachuk)
	1–5	42:35 – Matthews (Eichel, Q. Hughes) (PP)

8 min
Penalties
8 min
18
Shots
38

14 February 2026; 21:10	United States	6–3 (1–2, 3–1, 2–0)	Denmark	PalaItalia, Milan; Attendance: 11,480

Game reference

Jeremy Swayman
Goalies
Mads Søgaard
Frederik Dichow
Referees:
(Sweden) Michael Holm
(Canada) Dan O'Rourke
Linesmen:
(United States) Ryan Daisy
(Canada) Tarrington Wyonzek

	0–1	01:40 – Olesen (Mølgaard, Aagaard)
Boldy (Q. Hughes, Slavin) – 03:35	1–1
	1–2	11:16 – Jensen (Setkov)
B. Tkachuk (Eichel) – 29:26	2–2
Eichel (M. Tkachuk) – 30:23	3–2
Hanifin (Trocheck, Faber) – 37:23	4–2
	4–3	39:57 – Bruggisser (Ehlers, True)
Guentzel (Matthews) – 47:24	5–3
J. Hughes (Nelson) – 54:27	6–3

6 min
Penalties
4 min
47
Shots
21

15 February 2026; 21:10	United States	5–1 (1–0, 2–0, 2–1)	Germany	PalaItalia, Milan; Attendance: 11,497

Game reference

Connor Hellebuyck
Goalies
Maximilian Franzreb
Referees:
(Czech Republic) Jan Hribik
(Canada) Wes McCauley
Linesmen:
(United States) Nick Briganti
(Canada) Jonny Murray

Werenski (Matthews) – 19:51	1–0
Matthews (Q. Hughes, M. Tkachuk) (PP) – 23:25	2–0
Faber (M. Tkachuk, B. Tkachuk – 37:35	3–0
Thompson (Larkin, Sanderson) – 41:55	4–0
Matthews (Sanderson, Hanifin) – 46:46	5–0
	5–1	51:22 – Stützle (Peterka)

6 min
Penalties
4 min
37
Shots
24

Quarterfinal

18 February 2026; 21:10	United States	2–1 OT (0–0, 1–0, 0–1) (OT: 1–0)	Sweden	PalaItalia, Milan; Attendance: 11,097

Game reference

Connor Hellebuyck
Goalies
Jacob Markström
Referees:
(Canada) Eric Furlatt
(Canada) Wes McCauley
Linesmen:
(Canada) Scott Cherrey
(Finland) Onni Hautamäki

Larkin (J. Hughes, Q. Hughes) – 31:03	1–0
	1–1	58:29 – Zibanejad (Raymond, Landeskog) (EA)
Q. Hughes (Boldy, Matthews) – 63:27	2–1

2 min
Penalties
4 min
40
Shots
29

Semifinal

20 February 2026; 21:10	United States	6–2 (2–0, 3–0, 1–2)	Slovakia	PalaItalia, Milan; Attendance: 11,240

Game reference

Connor Hellebuyck
Goalies
Samuel Hlavaj
Stanislav Škorvánek
Referees:
(Canada) Gord Dwyer
(United States) Chris Rooney
Linesmen:
(Canada) Scott Cherrey
(Finland) Onni Hautamäki

Larkin (Werenski, Thompson) – 04:19	1–0
Thompson (Eichel, Q. Hughes) (PP) – 19:19	2–0
J. Hughes (Werenzki) – 32:14	3–0
Eichel (B. Tkachuk, M. Tkachuk) – 32:33	4–0
J. Hughes (Werenski, Boldy) – 38:24	5–0
	5–1	44:55 – Slafkovský (Ružička, Fehérváry)
B. Tkachuk (Trocheck, Hanifin) – 50:52	6–1
	6–2	53:17 – Regenda (Kelemen, Fehérváry)

30 min
Penalties
20 min
39
Shots
24

Gold medal game

22 February 2026; 14:10	Canada	1–2 OT (0–1, 1–0, 0–0) (OT: 0–1)	United States	PalaItalia, Milan; Attendance: 11,289

Game reference

Jordan Binnington
Goalies
Connor Hellebuyck
Referees:
(Canada) Gord Dwyer
(United States) Chris Rooney
Linesmen:
(Canada) Scott Cherrey
(Finland) Onni Hautamäki

	0–1	06:00 – Boldy (Matthews, Q. Hughes)
Makar (Toews) – 38:16	1–1
	1–2	61:41 – J. Hughes (Werenski, Hellebuyck)

6 min
Penalties
6 min
42
Shots
28

=== Women's tournament ===
The United States women's national ice hockey team qualified a team of 23 players by finishing second in the 2024 IIHF World Ranking.

Roster
The roster was announced on January 2, 2026.

Head coach: John Wroblewski

No.	Pos.	Name	Height	Weight	Birthdate	Team
2	D	Lee Stecklein	1.83 m (6 ft 0 in)	77 kg (170 lb)	23 April 1994 (aged 31)	(United States) Minnesota Frost
3	D	Cayla Barnes	1.57 m (5 ft 2 in)	63 kg (139 lb)	7 January 1999 (aged 27)	(United States) Seattle Torrent
4	D	Caroline Harvey	1.73 m (5 ft 8 in)	73 kg (161 lb)	14 October 2002 (aged 23)	(United States) Wisconsin Badgers
5	D	Megan Keller – A	1.80 m (5 ft 11 in)	75 kg (165 lb)	1 May 1996 (aged 29)	(United States) Boston Fleet
6	D	Rory Guilday	1.80 m (5 ft 11 in)	74 kg (163 lb)	7 September 2002 (aged 23)	(Canada) Ottawa Charge
8	D	Haley Winn	1.68 m (5 ft 6 in)	68 kg (150 lb)	14 July 2003 (aged 22)	(United States) Boston Fleet
9	F	Kirsten Simms	1.65 m (5 ft 5 in)	61 kg (134 lb)	31 August 2004 (aged 21)	(United States) Wisconsin Badgers
10	D	Laila Edwards	1.85 m (6 ft 1 in)	83 kg (183 lb)	25 January 2004 (aged 22)	(United States) Wisconsin Badgers
12	F	Kelly Pannek	1.70 m (5 ft 7 in)	75 kg (165 lb)	29 December 1995 (aged 30)	(United States) Minnesota Frost
13	F	Grace Zumwinkle	1.75 m (5 ft 9 in)	75 kg (165 lb)	23 April 1999 (aged 26)	(United States) Minnesota Frost
16	F	Hayley Scamurra	1.73 m (5 ft 8 in)	73 kg (161 lb)	14 December 1994 (aged 31)	(Canada) Montreal Victoire
17	F	Britta Curl-Salemme	1.75 m (5 ft 9 in)	72 kg (159 lb)	20 March 2000 (aged 25)	(United States) Minnesota Frost
21	F	Hilary Knight – C	1.80 m (5 ft 11 in)	78 kg (172 lb)	12 July 1989 (aged 36)	(United States) Seattle Torrent
22	F	Tessa Janecke	1.73 m (5 ft 8 in)	76 kg (168 lb)	12 May 2004 (aged 21)	(United States) Penn State Nittany Lions
23	F	Hannah Bilka	1.65 m (5 ft 5 in)	59 kg (130 lb)	24 March 2001 (aged 24)	(United States) Seattle Torrent
24	F	Joy Dunne	1.80 m (5 ft 11 in)	79 kg (174 lb)	13 June 2005 (aged 20)	(United States) Ohio State Buckeyes
25	F	Alex Carpenter – A	1.70 m (5 ft 7 in)	70 kg (150 lb)	13 April 1994 (aged 31)	(United States) Seattle Torrent
26	F	Kendall Coyne Schofield	1.57 m (5 ft 2 in)	57 kg (126 lb)	25 May 1992 (aged 33)	(United States) Minnesota Frost
27	F	Taylor Heise	1.78 m (5 ft 10 in)	74 kg (163 lb)	17 March 2000 (aged 25)	(United States) Minnesota Frost
30	G	Ava McNaughton	1.83 m (6 ft 0 in)	83 kg (183 lb)	27 October 2004 (aged 21)	(United States) Wisconsin Badgers
31	G	Aerin Frankel	1.65 m (5 ft 5 in)	63 kg (139 lb)	24 May 1999 (aged 26)	(United States) Boston Fleet
33	G	Gwyneth Philips	1.65 m (5 ft 5 in)	63 kg (139 lb)	17 September 2000 (aged 25)	(Canada) Ottawa Charge
37	F	Abbey Murphy	1.65 m (5 ft 5 in)	66 kg (146 lb)	14 April 2002 (aged 23)	(United States) Minnesota Golden Gophers

Group play

Pos	Team	Pld	W	OTW	OTL	L	GF	GA	GD	Pts	Qualification
1	United States	4	4	0	0	0	20	1	+19	12	Quarter-finals
2	Canada	4	3	0	0	1	14	6	+8	9	Quarter-finals
3	Czechia	4	1	0	1	2	7	14	−7	4	Quarter-finals
4	Finland	4	1	0	0	3	3	13	−10	3	Quarter-finals
5	Switzerland	4	0	1	0	3	5	15	−10	2	Quarter-finals

Source: IIHF

5 February 2026; 16:40 v	United States	5–1 (1–0, 3–1, 1–0)	Czechia	Fiera Milano, Milan; Attendance: 3,766

Game reference

Aerin Frankel
Goalies
Klára Peslarová
Referees:
(Austria) Julia Kainberger
(Canada) Cianna Murray
Linesmen:
(Sweden) Jessica Lundgren
(Canada) Justine Todd

Carpenter (Keller, Edwards) (PP) – 15:55	1–0
Dunne (Janecke) – 23:13	2–0
Scamurra (Janecke) – 24:36	3–0
	3–1	28:37 – Juříčková (Mlýnková)
Knight (Carpenter, Bilka) – 37:50	4–1
Scamurra (Pannek) – 44:22	5–1

2 min
Penalties
6 min
42
Shots
14

7 February 2026; 16:40 v	United States	5–0 (1–0, 3–0, 1–0)	Finland	Fiera Milano, Milan; Attendance: 3,843

Game reference

Aerin Frankel
Goalies
Sanni Ahola
Referees:
(Sweden) Ida Henriksson
(Canada) Elizabeth Mantha
Linesmen:
(United States) Jennifer Cameron
(Canada) Justine Todd

Carpenter (Edwards, Keller) (PP) – 15:19	1–0
Heise (Murphy, Curl-Salemme) – 22:31	2–0
Keller – 23:37	3–0
Knight (Edwards, Keller) (PP) – 29:17	4–0
Murphy (Curl-Salemme, Harvey) – 55:56	5–0

0 min
Penalties
12 min
49
Shots
11

9 February 2026; 20:40 v	Switzerland	0–5 (0–1, 0–1, 0–3)	United States	PalaItalia, Milan; Attendance: 11,132

Game reference

Andrea Brändli
Goalies
Gwyneth Philips
Referees:
(Austria) Julia Kainberger
(Canada) Shauna Neary
Linesmen:
(Canada) Laura Gutauskas
(Finland) Tiina Saarimäki

0–1	06:04 – Winn (Harvey, Knight)
0–2	34:08 – Dunne
0–3	41:17 – Bilka (Heise, Harvey)
0–4	46:34 – Carpenter (Knight, Dunne)
0–5	47:42 – Harvey (Carpenter, Dunne)

2 min
Penalties
4 min
21
Shots
50

10 February 2026; 20:10 v	Canada	0–5 (0–2, 0–2, 0–1)	United States	PalaItalia, Milan; Attendance: 11,390

Game reference

Ann-Renée Desbiens
Emerance Maschmeyer
Goalies
Aerin Frankel
Referees:
(Austria) Julia Kainberger
(Finland) Anniina Nurmi
Linesmen:
(United States) Sarah Buckner
(Canada) Laura Gutauskas

0–1	03:45 – Harvey (Winn, Knight)
0–2	17:18 – Bilka (Murphy, Harvey)
0–3	21:18 – Simms (Janecke, Murphy) (PP)
0–4	33:00 – Bilka (Murphy, Harvey)
0–5	51:53 – Edwards (Curl-Salemme)

10 min
Penalties
4 min
20
Shots
33

Quarterfinal

13 February 2026; 21:10 v	United States	6–0 (1–0, 5–0, 0–0)	Italy	Fiera Milano, Milan; Attendance: 3,930

Game reference

Gwyneth Philips
Goalies
Gabriella Durante
Referees:
(Sweden) Ida Henriksson
(Canada) Shauna Neary
Linesmen:
(Sweden) Jessica Lundgren
(Canada) Erin Zach

Keller (Edwards, Carpenter) – 13:31	1–0
Coyne (Harvey, Winn) – 21:41	2–0
Coyne (Curl, Zumwinkle) – 24:51	3–0
Edwards (Keller, Janecke) – 25:17	4–0
Curl (Dunne, Stecklein) (SH) – 31:29	5–0
Bilka (Heise, Harvey) – 38:27	6–0

8 min
Penalties
12 min
51
Shots
6

Semifinal

16 February 2026; 16:40 v	United States	5–0 (1–0, 4–0, 0–0)	Sweden	PalaItalia, Milan; Attendance: 7,894

Game reference

Aerin Frankel
Goalies
Ebba Svensson Träff
Emma Söderberg
Referees:
(Canada) Cianna Murray
(United States) Amanda Tassoni
Linesmen:
(Finland) Tiina Saarimäki
(Canada) Erin Zach

Barnes (Pannek, Stecklein) (EA) – 05:09	1–0
Heise (Bilka, Murphy) – 29:09	2–0
Murphy (Bilka, Winn) – 35:12	3–0
Coyne (Edwards, Keller) – 36:10	4–0
Scamurra (Curl-Salemme, Janecke) – 37:59	5–0

8 min
Penalties
6 min
34
Shots
23

Gold medal game

19 February 2026; 19:10 v	United States	2–1 OT (0–0, 0–1, 1–0) (OT: 1–0)	Canada	PalaItalia, Milan; Attendance: 11,171

Game reference

Aerin Frankel
Goalies
Ann-Renée Desbiens
Referees:
(United States) Kelly Cooke
(Canada) Cianna Murray
Linesmen:
(Czech Republic) Kristýna Hájková
(Finland) Tiina Saarimäki

	0–1	20:54 – O'Neill (Stacey, Fast) (SH)
Knight (Edwards, Keller) (EA) – 57:56	1–1
Keller (Heise) – 64:07	2–1

6 min
Penalties
2 min
33
Shots
31

== Luge ==
The United States qualified eleven (six male and five female) lugers in five luge events, singles and doubles for both men and women, and a relay event through the 2025–26 Luge World Cup and one Olympic test event. The team roster was revealed on January 12, 2026.

Men

Athlete	Event	Run 1		Run 2		Run 3		Run 4		Total	
Athlete	Event	Time	Rank	Time	Rank	Time	Rank	Time	Rank	Time	Rank
Matthew Greiner	Singles	53.814	15	53.946	18	53.936	19	54.176	20	3:35.872	20
Jonathan Gustafson	Singles	53.500	11	53.801	14	53.553	12	53.578	12	3:34.432	11
Zack DiGregorio; Sean Hollander	Doubles	52.744	8	52.723	7	—N/a				1:45.467	8
Ansel Haugsjaa; Marcus Mueller	Doubles	52.482	1	52.811	8	—N/a				1:45.293	6

Women

Athlete	Event	Run 1		Run 2		Run 3		Run 4		Total	
Athlete	Event	Time	Rank	Time	Rank	Time	Rank	Time	Rank	Time	Rank
Summer Britcher	Singles	53.389	15	53.225	13	53.516	15	53.423	16	3:33.553	14
Ashley Farquharson	Singles	52.862	4	52.934	7	52.877	3	52.909	4	3:31.582	3rd place, bronze medalist(s)
Emily Fischnaller	Singles	52.892	7	52.980	9	52.876	2	54.287	19	3:33.035	12
Chevonne Forgan; Sophia Kirkby	Doubles	53.570	5	53.995	7	—N/a				1:47.565	5

Mixed

Athlete	Event	Women's singles		Men's doubles		Men's singles		Women's doubles		Total	
Athlete	Event	Time	Rank	Time	Rank	Time	Rank	Time	Rank	Time	Rank
Ashley Farquharson; Chevonne Forgan / Sophia Kirkby; Jonathan Gustafson; Ansel Haugsjaa / Marcus Mueller	Team relay	55.771	3	55.281	2	55.197	5	56.527	5	3:42.776	5

== Nordic combined ==
The United States qualified two competitors as scored in World or Grand Prix point and the Continental Cup standings. The team roster was announced on January 21, 2026.

Athlete	Event	Ski jumping			Cross-country		Total	
Athlete	Event	Distance	Points	Rank	Time	Rank	Time	Rank
Ben Loomis	Individual normal hill / 10km	95.0	118.9	16	32:43.3	20	33:38.4	17
Niklas Malacinski	Individual normal hill / 10km	97.5	114.3	19	32:26.1	17	33:39.1	18
Ben Loomis	Individual large hill / 10 km	123.0	119.2	22	26:41.9	26	28:44.9	27
Niklas Malacinski	Individual large hill / 10 km	129.5	129.9	12	25:47.4	16	27:07.4	13
Ben Loomis; Niklas Malacinski	Team large hill / 2 × 7.5 km	236.0	213.9	7	42:59.8	8	43:42.8	7

== Short-track speed skating ==
The United States qualified eight short-track speed skaters (three men and five women) after the conclusion of the 2025–26 ISU Short Track World Tour.

On 13 December 2025, US Speedskating announced that eight athletes would represent Team USA in short track speed skating at the Games. The eight athletes include Corinne Stoddard, Kristen Santos-Griswold, Julie Letai, Kamryn Lute, Eunice Lee, Andrew Heo, Brandon Kim and Clayton DeClemente.

Men

Athlete	Event	Heat		Quarterfinal		Semifinal		Final	
Athlete	Event	Time	Rank	Time	Rank	Time	Rank	Time	Rank
Andrew Heo	500 m	41.136	1 Q	40.724	4	Did not advance			13
Brandon Kim	500 m	PEN		Did not advance					=29
Clayton DeClemente	1000 m	1:26.189	2 Q	1:24.244	5	Did not advance			16
Brandon Kim	1000 m	PEN		Did not advance					=31
Clayton DeClemente	1500 m	—N/a		2:32.539	6	Did not advance			33
Andrew Heo	1500 m	—N/a		2:20.826	2 Q	2:16.150	4 FB	2:34.460	11
Brandon Kim	1500 m	—N/a		2:16.154	2 Q	2:15.817	3 FB	2:35.254	15

Women

Athlete	Event	Heat		Quarterfinal		Semifinal		Final	
Athlete	Event	Time	Rank	Time	Rank	Time	Rank	Time	Rank
Julie Letai	500 m	43.275	3 q	1:08.606	4	Did not advance			16
Kristen Santos-Griswold	500 m	42.767	1 Q	42.174	1 Q	45.364	4 FB	1:08.444	9
Corinne Stoddard	500 m	1:11.651	4	Did not advance					31
Julie Letai	1000 m	1:30.287	4	Did not advance					28
Kristen Santos-Griswold	1000 m	1:28.564	2 Q	1:29.102	3	Did not advance			12
Corinne Stoddard	1000 m	1:32.178	3	Did not advance					24
Kamryn Lute	1500 m	—N/a		2:30.347	4	Did not advance			23
Kristen Santos-Griswold	1500 m	—N/a		PEN		Did not advance			=33
Corinne Stoddard	1500 m	—N/a		2:27.961	1 Q	2:21.042	2 FA	2:32.578	3rd place, bronze medalist(s)
Eunice Lee; Julie Letai; Kamryn Lute^{[b]} Kristen Santos-Griswold; Corinne Stoddard	3000 m relay	—N/a				4:07.415	3 FB	PEN	8

Mixed

Athlete	Event	Quarterfinal		Semifinal		Final	
Athlete	Event	Time	Rank	Time	Rank	Time	Rank
Andrew Heo; Brandon Kim; Julie Letai; Kristen Santos-Griswold; Corinne Stoddard^{[b]}	2000 m relay	2:43.894	2 Q	2:53.341	4 FB	2:57.160	8

Qualification legend: Q – Qualify based on position in heat; q – Qualify based on time in field; FA – Qualify to medal final; FB – Qualify to consolation final
^{b} – Athlete skated in a preliminary round but not the final.

== Skeleton ==
The United States qualified two male and two female skeleton racers through performances at the 2025–26 Skeleton World Cup. The team roster was announced on January 19, 2026.

Athlete	Event	Run 1		Run 2		Run 3		Run 4		Total	
Athlete	Event	Time	Rank	Time	Rank	Time	Rank	Time	Rank	Time	Rank
Dan Barefoot	Men's	57.47	18	57.22	18	57.75	23	57.42	=21	3:49.86	20
Austin Florian	Men's	56.95	14	56.59	9	56.54	12	56.51	12	3:46.59	12
Kelly Curtis	Women's	57.81	9	57.88	12	58.30	16	58.14	14	3:52.13	12
Mystique Ro	Women's	58.25	17	58.11	16	57.91	10	58.21	=15	3:52.48	15
Dan Barefoot; Kelly Curtis	Mixed team relay	1:01.30	9	1:00.13	14	—N/a				2:01.43	10
Austin Florian; Mystique Ro	Mixed team relay	1:01.08	7	59.31	7	—N/a				2:00.39	7

== Ski jumping ==
The United States qualified three male and three female athletes as World Cup and Grand Prix events, competing in all events – four individual men's and women's events, as well as two team events. The team roster was announced on January 21, 2026.

Men

Athlete	Event	Trial round			First round			Second round					Final			Total	
Athlete	Event	Distance	Points	Rank	Distance	Points	Rank	Distance	Points	Rank	Total	Rank	Distance	Points	Rank	Points	Rank
Kevin Bickner	Normal hill	101.0	76.0	20	100.0	121.1	33	—N/a					Did not advance				
Jason Colby	Normal hill	97.0	75.6	24	102.0	122.5	=30 Q	—N/a					100.5	129.8	10	252.3	20
Tate Frantz	Normal hill	98.5	69.9	32	99.5	122.5	=30 Q	—N/a					101.5	129.4	13	251.9	21
Kevin Bickner	Large hill	126.5	65.2	26	126.5	125.0	22 Q	—N/a					134.0	124.1	21	249.1	20
Jason Colby	Large hill	128.0	68.5	16	123.5	119.8	31	—N/a					Did not advance				
Tate Frantz	Large hill	131.5	62.9	29	133.0	129.8	17 Q	—N/a					128.5	124.3	20	254.1	19
Kevin Bickner; Tate Frantz	Team large hill	—N/a			261.0	255.5	10 Q	262.5	264.7	4	520.2	8 Q	Cancelled			520.2	8

Women

Athlete	Event	Trial round			First round			Final			Total	
Athlete	Event	Distance	Points	Rank	Distance	Points	Rank	Distance	Points	Rank	Points	Rank
Annika Belshaw	Normal hill	91.0	77.6	28	93.5	118.5	16 Q	93.0	106.9	25	225.4	21
Josie Johnson	Normal hill	97.0	83.9	=17	91.5	109.9	28 Q	92.5	106.5	26	216.4	27
Paige Jones	Normal hill	99.0	88.3	=11	95.0	112.2	24 Q	97.0	110.4	21	222.6	23
Annika Belshaw	Large hill	113.0	51.0	29	119.0	98.5	29 Q	DSQ				
Josie Johnson	Large hill	122.5	67.3	13	125.5	109.0	21 Q	DNS			109.0	29
Paige Jones	Large hill	108.5	47.6	31	116.0	97.9	30 Q	101.5	84.8	28	182.7	28

Mixed

Athlete	Event	First round			Final			Total	
Athlete	Event	Distance	Points	Rank	Distance	Points	Rank	Points	Rank
Annika Belshaw; Jason Colby; Tate Frantz; Paige Jones	Team normal hill	378.5	462.4	6 Q	378.0	470.5	7	932.9	7

== Ski mountaineering ==
The United States qualified one female and one male ski mountaineer through the Olympic ranking lists.

Athlete	Event	Heat		Semifinal		Final	
Athlete	Event	Time	Rank	Time	Rank	Time	Rank
Cameron Smith	Men's sprint	2:47.59	4 q	2:50.74	6	Did not advance	11
Anna Gibson	Women's sprint	3:17.44	5 q	3:15.69	5	Did not advance	9
Anna Gibson; Cameron Smith	Mixed relay	—N/a				27:40.4	4

Qualification legend: Q – Qualify to next round based on position in heat; q – Qualify to next round based on time in field

== Snowboarding ==
The United States secured 25 quotas in all events (thirteen male and twelve female) through the World Cups and the results of the 2025 World Championship. However, as Cody Winters competed in both giant slalom and snowboard cross, there were only 24 athletes present at the games. The team roster was announced on January 21, 2026.

Freestyle
Men

Athlete	Event	Qualification					Final				
Athlete	Event	Run 1	Run 2	Run 3	Best	Rank	Run 1	Run 2	Run 3	Best	Rank
Jake Canter	Big air	89.00	71.25	DNI	160.25	15	Did not advance				
Sean FitzSimons	Big air	60.75	75.25	DNI	136.00	25	Did not advance				
Red Gerard	Big air	70.75	83.50	72.00	155.50	20	Did not advance				
Ollie Martin	Big air	19.75	82.25	85.25	167.50	9 Q	29.75	79.50	83.50	163.00	4
Alessandro Barbieri	Halfpipe	88.50	DNI	—N/a	88.50	4 Q	75.00	DNI	DNI	75.00	10
Chase Blackwell	Halfpipe	69.00	DNI	—N/a	69.00	15	Did not advance				
Chase Josey	Halfpipe	76.50	DNI	—N/a	76.50	11 Q	11.75	70.25	DNI	70.25	11
Jake Pates	Halfpipe	24.25	75.50	—N/a	75.50	12 Q	77.50	DNI	DNI	77.50	8
Jake Canter	Slopestyle	70.53	60.00	—N/a	70.53	10 Q	70.58	33.11	79.36	79.36	3rd place, bronze medalist(s)
Sean FitzSimons	Slopestyle	26.50	20.43	—N/a	26.50	26	Did not advance				
Red Gerard	Slopestyle	57.43	70.00	—N/a	70.00	11 Q	76.60	29.71	41.65	76.60	6
Ollie Martin	Slopestyle	66.51	78.30	—N/a	78.30	6 Q	48.23	73.96	75.36	75.36	9

Women

Athlete	Event	Qualification					Final				
Athlete	Event	Run 1	Run 2	Run 3	Best	Rank	Run 1	Run 2	Run 3	Best	Rank
Lily Dhawornvej	Big air	83.75	19.25	58.00	141.75	20	Did not advance				
Hahna Norman	Big air	31.75	82.00	11.50	93.50	28	Did not advance				
Jess Perlmutter	Big air	77.00	55.25	17.00	132.25	23	Did not advance				
Bea Kim	Halfpipe	76.75	DNI	—N/a	76.75	10 Q	7.25	77.00	DNI	77.00	8
Chloe Kim	Halfpipe	90.25	DNI	—N/a	90.25	1 Q	88.00	DNI	DNI	88.00	2nd place, silver medalist(s)
Maddie Mastro	Halfpipe	81.00	86.00	—N/a	86.00	3 Q	5.50	5.25	DNI	5.50	12
Maddy Schaffrick	Halfpipe	25.75	61.75	—N/a	61.75	15	Did not advance				
Lily Dhawornvej	Slopestyle	11.73	68.90	—N/a	68.90	10 Q	41.81	17.25	24.50	41.81	11
Hahna Norman	Slopestyle	23.00	41.70	—N/a	41.70	25	Did not advance				
Jess Perlmutter	Slopestyle	31.48	68.58	—N/a	68.58	11 Q	44.70	68.18	43.30	68.18	6

Parallel

Athlete	Event	Qualification		Round of 16	Quarterfinal	Semifinal	Final	
Athlete	Event	Time	Rank	Opposition Time	Opposition Time	Opposition Time	Opposition Time	Rank
Cody Winters	Men's giant slalom	1:27.99	21	Did not advance				
Iris Pflum	Women's giant slalom	1:40.08	30	Did not advance				

Snowboard cross
Men

Athlete	Event	Seeding		Round of 16	Quarterfinal	Semifinal	Final	
Athlete	Event	Time	Rank	Position	Position	Position	Position	Rank
Nick Baumgartner	Snowboard cross	1:08.79	22	1 Q	2 Q	3 FB	3	7
Nathan Pare	Snowboard cross	1:09.07	13	2 Q	RAL	Did not advance		16
Jake Vedder	Snowboard cross	1:08.96	23	2 Q	3	Did not advance		11
Cody Winters	Snowboard cross	1:09.62	26	3	Did not advance			22

Women

Athlete	Event	Seeding		Round of 16	Quarterfinal	Semifinal	Final	
Athlete	Event	Time	Rank	Position	Position	Position	Position	Rank
Stacy Gaskill	Snowboard cross	1:14.60	13	2 Q	4	Did not advance		14
Hanna Percy	Snowboard cross	1:15.27	15	3	Did not advance			18
Brianna Schnorrbusch	Snowboard cross	1:15.29	16	3	Did not advance			19
Faye Thelen	Snowboard cross	1:14.62	21	2 Q	2 Q	3 FB	3	7

Mixed

Athlete	Event	Quarterfinal	Semifinal	Final	
Athlete	Event	Position	Position	Position	Rank
Nick Baumgartner; Faye Thelen	Team snowboard cross	4	Did not advance		15
Stacy Gaskill; Nathan Pare	Team snowboard cross	DNF	Did not advance		14

Qualification legend: Q – Qualify to next round; FA – Qualify to medal final; FB – Qualify to consolation final

== Speed skating ==
The United States qualified thirteen speed skaters (seven men and six women) through performances at the 2025–26 ISU Speed Skating World Cup.

The 2026 U.S. Olympic Long Track Team Trials took place on 2–5 January 2026 as the Team USA qualifying event for the games. Casey Dawson, Jordan Stolz, Conor McDermott-Mostowy, Cooper McLeod, Emery Lehman, Zach Stoppelmoor and Ethan Cepuran qualified for the men's events. Erin Jackson, Brittany Bowe, Greta Myers, Mia Manganello, Sarah Warren and Giorgia Birkeland qualified for the women's events. The team roster was announced on January 6, 2026.

Distance
Men

Athlete	Event	Race	
Athlete	Event	Time	Rank
Cooper McLeod	500 m	34.90	22
Jordan Stolz	500 m	33.77 OR	1st place, gold medalist(s)
Zach Stoppelmoor	500 m	35.42	27
Conor McDermott-Mostowy	1000 m	1:08.48	9
Cooper McLeod	1000 m	1:09.319	19
Jordan Stolz	1000 m	1:06.28 OR	1st place, gold medalist(s)
Casey Dawson	1500 m	1:47.88	29
Emery Lehman	1500 m	1:47.23	25
Jordan Stolz	1500 m	1:42.75	2nd place, silver medalist(s)
Casey Dawson	5000 m	6:11.88	8
Casey Dawson	10000 m	WDR	

Women

Athlete	Event	Race	
Athlete	Event	Time	Rank
Erin Jackson	500 m	37.32	5
Sarah Warren	500 m	39.19	28
Brittany Bowe	1000 m	1:14.55	4
Erin Jackson	1000 m	1:15.00	6
Brittany Bowe	1500 m	1:54.70	4
Greta Myers	1500 m	1:59.81	29
Greta Myers	3000 m	4:13.46	20

Mass start

Athlete	Event	Semifinal			Final		
Athlete	Event	Points	Time	Rank	Points	Time	Rank
Ethan Cepuran	Men's mass start	1	7:53.07	9	Did not advance		
Jordan Stolz	Men's mass start	11	7:43.81	4 Q	10	8:04.51	4
Mia Manganello	Women's mass start	23	8:36.62	3 Q	20	8:35.39	3rd place, bronze medalist(s)
Greta Myers	Women's mass start	3	8:48.84	8 Q	1	8:37.14	12

Team pursuit

Athlete	Event	Quarterfinal		Semifinal		Final	
Athlete	Event	Opposition Time	Rank	Opposition Time	Rank	Opposition Time	Rank
Ethan Cepuran; Casey Dawson; Emery Lehman	Men's team pursuit	Italy; L 3:39.36	2 Q	China; W 3:44.29	1 FA	Italy; L 3:43.71	2nd place, silver medalist(s)
Giorgia Birkeland^{[c]} Brittany Bowe; Mia Manganello; Greta Myers	Women's team pursuit	Germany; W 2:58.32	4 Q	Canada; L 3:00.14	2 FB	Japan; L 3:02.00	4

Qualification legend: Q – Qualify to next round; FA – Qualify to gold medal final; FB – Qualify to bronze medal final
^{c} – Athlete skated in a preliminary round but not the final.

== See also ==
- United States at the 2026 Winter Paralympics
