= Guentzel =

Guentzel is a surname. Notable people with the surname include:

- Jake Guentzel (born 1994), American ice hockey player
- Mike Guentzel (born 1962), American ice hockey player and coach
- Gabe Guentzel (born 1988), American ice hockey player

== See also ==
- Gentzel
