= Eunice Lee =

Eunice Lee may refer to:

- Eunice C. Lee (born 1970), American judge
- Eunice Lee (speed skater) (born 2004), American short track speed skater
