= Kamryn Lute =

American speed skater (born 2004)

Personal information
- Born: August 28, 2004 (age 21) New York City, New York, U.S.

Sport
- Country: United States
- Sport: Short track speed skating
Medal record
Women's short-track speed skating
Representing the United States
Four Continents Championships
Bronze medal – third place	2023 Salt Lake City	3000 m relay

Kamryn Lute (born August 28, 2004) is an American short track speed skater. She represented the United States at the 2026 Winter Olympics.

== Early life ==
Kamryn Lute was born in New York City on August 28, 2004. She started short-track at age five at the Virginia club, after watching the 2010 Winter Olympics.

== Career ==
In 2020, Lute qualified for the World Junior Short Track Championships and the following year, she participated in the women's relay at the World Championships, where the team finished seventh. She joined the US national team for the first time as an individual in 2022.

In November 2022, Lute competed at the 2023 Four Continents Short Track Speed Skating Championships and won a bronze medal in 3000 metres relay, although she did not compete in the final.

In April 2024, at the age of 19, Lute received a one-year suspension after using a performance-enhancing drug on the advice of a doctor; the blame was placed on the doctor, not on her. Her competition results were not erased.

During the 2025–26 season, Lute participated in the women's relay: in one heat, she won a silver medal with Kristen Santos-Griswold, Corinne Stoddard, Eunice Lee and Julie Letai and the relay qualified for the Olympic Games. On December 13, 2025, she was named to team USA's roster for the 2026 Winter Olympics.

Lute is registered with the South Jordan club, coached by Steve Gough. She trains six days a week for two hours off the ice and one or two hours on the ice per day.

== Personal life ==
At 17, Lute was diagnosed with Hashimoto’s and the following year with Sharp syndrome.

Lute is Jewish, and practices Jewish traditions including lighting Shabbat candles, and had a bat mitzvah. At the 2026 Winter Olympics, she recited the Shehecheyanu blessing during the opening ceremony and described praying with her mother as part of her pre-race routine.
