= 2023 Four Continents Short Track Speed Skating Championships =

- Venue: Utah Olympic Oval
- Location: Salt Lake City, United States
- Dates: 10–12 November 2022
- Competitors: 72 from 13 nations

The 2023 Four Continents Short Track Speed Skating Championships is the second Four Continents Short Track Speed Skating Championships and to be held from 10 to 12 November 2022 in Salt Lake City, United States. Skaters from 13 countries participated in the competition.

== Medal summary ==
=== Men's events ===
| Event | Gold | | Silver | | Bronze | |
|---|---|---|---|---|---|---|
| 500 metres | Steven Dubois; Canada | 40.316 | Andrew Heo; United States | 40.687 | Pascal Dion; Canada | 41.482 |
| 1000 metres | Park Ji-won; South Korea | 1:27.548 | Pascal Dion; Canada | 1:27.592 | William Dandjinou; Canada | 1:27.816 |
| 1500 metres | Park Ji-won; South Korea | 2:16.409 | Hong Kyung-hwan; South Korea | 2:16.471 | Steven Dubois; Canada | 2:16.702 |
| 5000 metre relay | China; Li Kun; Liu Guanyi; Song Jiahua; Zhong Yuchen | 6:54.766 | Japan; Kosei Hayashi; Dan Iwasa; Kiichi Shigehiro; Kazuki Yoshinaga | 6:56.071 | South Korea; Lee Dong-hyun; Lee June-seo; Lim Yong-jin; Park Ji-won; Hong Kyung-hwan | 7:12.956 |

=== Women's events ===
| Event | Gold | | Silver | | Bronze | |
|---|---|---|---|---|---|---|
| 500 metres | Shim Suk-hee; South Korea | 43.273 | Kristen Santos-Griswold; United States | 43.302 | Zhang Chutong; China | 43.503 |
| 1000 metres | Courtney Sarault; Canada | 1:28.615 | Gong Li; China | 1:28.840 | Claudia Gagnon; Canada | 1:28.963 |
| 1500 metres | Courtney Sarault; Canada | 2:25.614 | Kristen Santos-Griswold; United States | 2:25.708 | Choi Min-jeong; South Korea | 2:25.737 |
| 3000 metre relay | South Korea; Choi Min-jeong; Kim Gil-li; Lee So-youn; Shim Suk-hee | 4:04.767 | Canada; Ann-Sophie Bachand; Claudia Gagnon; Courtney Sarault; Renée Steenge | 4:05.049 | United States; Eunice Lee; Julie Letai; Kristen Santos-Griswold; Corinne Stoddard; Kamryn Lute | 4:06.964 |

=== Mixed event ===
| Event | Gold | | Silver | | Bronze | |
|---|---|---|---|---|---|---|
| 2000 metre relay | United States; Andrew Heo; Marcus Howard; Kristen Santos-Griswold; Corinne Stoddard | 2:38.095 | China; Gong Li; Li Kun; Wang Xinran; Zhong Yuchen | 2:38.244 | Canada; Steven Dubois; Maxime Laoun; Courtney Sarault; Léa Tessier; Philippe Daudelin; Renée Steenge | 2:46.024 |

=== Medal table ===
* Host nation (United States)

| Rank | Nation | Gold | Silver | Bronze | Total |
|---|---|---|---|---|---|
| 1 | South Korea | 4 | 1 | 2 | 7 |
| 2 | Canada | 3 | 2 | 5 | 10 |
| 3 | United States* | 1 | 3 | 1 | 5 |
| 4 | China | 1 | 2 | 1 | 4 |
| 5 | Japan | 0 | 1 | 0 | 1 |
| Totals (5 entries) | | 9 | 9 | 9 | 27 |
