= Brandon Kim =

American speed skater (born 2001)

Personal information
- Born: August 30, 2001 (age 24) Fairfax, Virginia, U.S.
- Height: 5 ft 8 in (173 cm)

Sport
- Country: United States
- Sport: Short track speed skating
Medal record
Men's short-track speed skating
Representing the United States
World Junior Championships
Bronze medal – third place	2017 Innsbruck	3000 m relay

Brandon Kim (born August 30, 2001) is an American short track speed skater.

== Career ==
At the junior level, Kim competed at the 2017 World Junior Short Track Speed Skating Championships and won the bronze medal in 3000 metres relay.

== World Tour medal record ==
Season	Location	Mixed relay
2024–2025	(Netherlands) Tilburg	3rd place, bronze medalist(s)
2025–2026	(Netherlands) Dordrecht	2nd place, silver medalist(s)
