= Lucinda Anderson =

American biathlete

Personal information
- Nickname: Luci
- Born: December 3, 2000 (age 25) Minnesota, U.S.
- Home town: Golden Valley, Minnesota, U.S.

Sport
- Country: United States
- Sport: Biathlon, Cross-country skiing

Lucinda Anderson (born December 3, 2000) is an American biathlete and former cross-country skier. She represented the United States at the 2026 Winter Olympics and competed at the 2025 Biathlon World Championships. Anderson is a member of Team Birkie and part of U.S. Biathlon's Project X development program.

== Early life and education ==
Anderson grew up in Golden Valley, Minnesota. She attended Armstrong High School, where she competed in Nordic skiing and helped her team win state championships in 2016 and 2019.

Anderson attended the University of New Hampshire, where she earned a Bachelor of Science in bioengineering in 2023. She subsequently completed a Master of Science in molecular and cellular biotechnology at the same institution in 2024.

At UNH, she competed on the women's Nordic ski team, served as a two-time team captain, and earned All-East First Team honors three times (2021, 2023, 2024).

== Cross-country skiing career ==
Before entering biathlon, Anderson spent many years as a cross-country skier, competing in high school and collegiately. She was named an All-American in the 10 km skate at the NCAA Championships during her final collegiate season.

== Biathlon career ==
=== Transition to biathlon ===
Anderson switched to biathlon in 2024 after graduating from the University of New Hampshire. She entered the sport through U.S. Biathlon's Project X development program and quickly progressed through the international ranks.

She made her International Biathlon Union (IBU) Cup debut in November 2024 and her Biathlon World Cup debut in December 2024 in Hochfilzen, Austria.

== Personal life ==
Anderson's hobbies include knitting and spending time with friends and family.
