= Clayton DeClemente =

American speed skater (born 1999)

Personal information
- Born: September 16, 1999 (age 26) Poughkeepsie, New York, U.S.

Sport
- Sport: Short-track speed skating

Clayton DeClemente (born September 16, 1999) is an American short-track speed skater.

== Early life and education ==
DeClemente is from Poughkeepsie. He initially played roller hockey, and his mother noticed his speed and chose to enroll him in the local speed skating club in 2011. He is coached by Elena Sklutovsky at the Danbury short-track club.

DeClemente attended Arlington High School in LaGrange and graduated in 2017. After a year of college at Dutchess Community College, he specialized in short track speed skating and moved to Salt Lake City to join the national development team.

== Career ==
DeClemente joined the national team in 2020. He finished on the podium at the national championships in 2021, 2023, 2024, 2025 and 2026. He finished twentieth in the 1500 meters at the 2023 World Championships. During the 2024-2025 Short Track Speed Skating World Cup season, he finished 20th in the 1500 meters and was the top-ranked American.

As of 2025, DeClemente trains on ice from 9am to 11am Monday through Saturday, adding 90 minutes of on-ice training three afternoons a week, and a one-hour weight training session once or twice a week. He also works at the concession stand of the Utah Olympic Oval in Salt Lake City.

In January 2026, DeClemente was selected to represent the United States at the 2026 Winter Olympics.
