= Mike Guentzel =

American ice hockey player and coach

Biographical details
- Born: August 23, 1962 (age 64); Grand Rapids, Minnesota

Playing career
- 1981–1985: Minnesota
- 1984–1985: New Haven Nighthawks
- 1985–1986: Salt Lake Golden Eagles
- Position: Defenseman

Coaching career (HC unless noted)
- 1988–1989: St. Paul Vulcans (assistant)
- 1989–1992: St. Paul Vulcans
- 1992–1994: Omaha Lancers
- 1994–2008: Minnesota (assistant)
- 2008–2009: Colorado College (assistant)
- 2009–2010: Des Moines Buccaneers
- 2010–2011: Nebraska–Omaha (assistant)
- 2011–2018: Minnesota (assistant)

Head coaching record
- Overall: 2–1–0 (college)

Accomplishments and honors

Championships
- 1996 WCHA Tournament Champion

Mike Guentzel (born August 23, 1962) is an American ice hockey coach and former defenceman. He currently works as a pro scout for the Utah Mammoth.

== Career ==
Guentzel played four years at Minnesota before embarking on a short professional career. After hanging up his skates in 1986 he turned to coaching and joined the staff of the St. Paul Vulcans of the USHL. After a year as an assistant he was named head coach, serving in that capacity for four campaigns before accepting the same position with the Omaha Lancers. In 1994 he returned to his alma mater as an assistant coach, serving under first Doug Woog and then Don Lucia after the former retired in 1999. Twice Guentzel served as head coach for Minnesota when Woog was suspended, first for the 1996 WCHA Title Game and a second time the following October. Guentzel helped the Golden Gophers win back-to-back national titles in 2002 and 2003 and stayed with the team until resigning to pursue other opportunities in 2008.

Guentzel's first stop was at Colorado College as an assistant for the 2008–09 season. The following year, after coaching his son Gabe, he returned to the USHL to lead the Des Moines Buccaneers but after a poor year he was back in the college ranks, this time with Nebraska–Omaha. Guentzel was again on the move after a year with the Mavericks and he returned to the Golden Gophers in the summer of 2011. Guentzel has remained with the Gophers since and was promoted to associate head coach in 2015.

== Personal life ==
Three of Mike's sons, Ryan, Gabe and Jake have all played college ice hockey with both Gabe and Jake playing professionally.

== Head coaching record ==
=== College ===
Record table
Season	Team	Overall	Conference	Standing	Postseason
Minnesota Golden Gophers (WCHA) (1996–1996)
1995–96	Minnesota	1–0–0†	0–0–0†	–	–
1996–97	Minnesota	1–1–0†	1–1–0†	–	–
Minnesota:		2–1–0	1–1–0		
Total:		2–1–0			
National champion Postseason invitational champion Conference regular season champion Conference regular season and conference tournament champion Division regular season champion Division regular season and conference tournament champion Conference tournament champion

†Guentzel served as interim coach for three games while Doug Woog was suspended on two occasions
