= Gabe Guentzel =

American ice hockey player

- Born: May 2, 1988 (age 38) Woodbury, Minnesota, U.S.
- Height: 6 ft 0 in (183 cm)
- Weight: 194 lb (88 kg; 13 st 12 lb)
- Position: Defense
- Shoots: Left
- team Former teams: Free agent Syracuse Crunch; Norfolk Admirals; Ritten/Renon; Asplöven HC; Augsburger Panther
- NHL draft: Undrafted
- Playing career: 2012–present

Gabriel John Guentzel (born May 2, 1988) is an American professional ice hockey player. He holds dual citizenship in the United States and Germany. Guentzel is currently an unrestricted free agent who most recently played under contract with German DEL outfit Augsburger Panther.

== Playing career ==
A 6 ft 0 in (1.83 m) defenseman, Guentzel graduated from Hill-Murray High School in Maplewood, Minnesota in 2006. He played in the North American Hockey League and the United States Hockey League before embarking on a four-year NCAA career at Colorado College. As a freshman (2008–09), he saw the ice in 36 games, scoring three goals while assisting on 13 others (16 points) and was presented with the Bob Johnson Award as the Tigers' freshman of the Year. Statistically, his best college season was his junior year, when he recorded 28 points (six goals, 22 assists). As a senior, Guentzel was named to the All-Western Collegiate Hockey Association Second Team.

Upon graduation, he signed with the Syracuse Crunch of the American Hockey League, with his debut coming on March 21, 2012. He split the following season, 2012–13, between the Norfolk Admirals (AHL) and the Fort Wayne Komets (ECHL).

Guentzel landed his first overseas job in 2013, signing with Rittner Buam of the Italian elite league Serie A, helping the team win the Italian championship in the 2013–14 season. He then signed with Swedish second-division side Asplöven HC for the 2014–15 campaign and moved to Germany during the season, signing with the Fischtown Pinguins, a Bremerhaven-based member of the second-tier DEL2, in January 2015. He then re-signed with the Pinguins for the 2015–16 season and in March 2016 received DEL2 Defenseman of the Year honors.

Guentzel left Bremerhaven at the conclusion of the 2015–16 season and inked a deal with the Augsburger Panther organization of the German top-tier Deutsche Eishockey Liga (DEL) in May 2016.

== Personal life ==
Guentzel comes from an ice hockey family: His dad Mike is coaching at the University of Minnesota. His older brother Ryan played collegiately and professionally. His younger brother Jake was drafted by the Pittsburgh Penguins in 2013. He signed out of college with them in 2016, and has won the Stanley Cup in 2017, and was an All-Star in 2020.
