= Gentzel =

Gentzel is a Swedish surname. Notable people with the surname include:

- Heiko Gentzel (born Erfurt in 1960), German politician
- Inga Gentzel (1908–1991), Swedish runner
- Ludde Gentzel (1885–1963), Swedish film actor, uncle of Inga
- Peter Gentzel (born 1968), Swedish handball player
