= Julie Letai =

American speed skater (born 2000)

Julie Letai OLY
Personal information
- Born: June 23, 2000 (age 26) Medfield, Massachusetts, U.S.

Sport
- Country: United States
- Sport: Short track speed skating
Medal record
Women's short-track speed skating
Representing the United States
World Short Track Championships
Silver medal – second place	2024 Rotterdam	3000 m relay
Four Continents Championships
Silver medal – second place	2024 Laval	2000 m mixed relay
Bronze medal – third place	2023 Salt Lake City	3000 m relay
Winter World University Games
Bronze medal – third place	2023 Lake Placid	3000 m relay

Julie Letai (born June 23, 2000) is an American short track speed skater. She represented the United States at the 2022 Winter Olympics in Beijing and the 2026 Winter Olympics in Milan.

== Early life and education ==
Letai is the daughter of Anthony and Jean Letai, and has two older siblings. Her father, Dr. Anthony Letai, is an oncologist and the director of the National Cancer Institute.

Letai attended Medfield High School and ran outdoor track and cross-country. She began skating at two years old, and speedskating at seven years old. She attends the University of Utah part-time, and intends to have a career in healthcare after her sporting career is over.

== Career ==
During the 2019–20 season, she won a bronze medal with the relay team in Shanghai, along with Maame Biney, Kristen Santos and Corinne Stoddard. This was the United States' first World Cup medal in the event in eight years. She represented the United States at the 2022 Winter Olympics.

In November 2022, she competed at the 2023 Four Continents Short Track Speed Skating Championships and won a bronze medal in 3000 metres relay, along with Eunice Lee, Santos and Stoddard. In January 2023, she competed at the 2023 Winter World University Games and won a bronze medal in the 3000 metres relay. She also advanced to the B Final in both the 1000 metres and 1500 metres. She won the 1000 metres with a time of 1:37.609 and was runner-up in the 1500 metres B Final with a time of 2:40.274.

In November 2023, she competed at the 2024 Four Continents Short Track Speed Skating Championships and won a silver medal in the, along with Andrew Heo, Marcus Howard and Santos-Griswold, with a time of 2:40.243. She also competed in the 500 metres, and crossed the line third but was penalized due to an arm tangle with Canada's Florence Brunelle. In March 2024, she competed at the 2024 World Short Track Speed Skating Championships and won a silver medal in 3000 metres relay, along with Lee, Santos-Griswold and Stoddard, with a time of 4:08.061.

Letai missed the 2024–25 ISU Short Track World Tour due to injury. On December 13, 2025, she was named to team USA's roster for the 2026 Winter Olympics. She solidified her Olympic spot with multiple relay medals and her individual ranking over the 2025 Fall World Cup season.
