= Jake Guentzel =

American ice hockey player (born 1994)

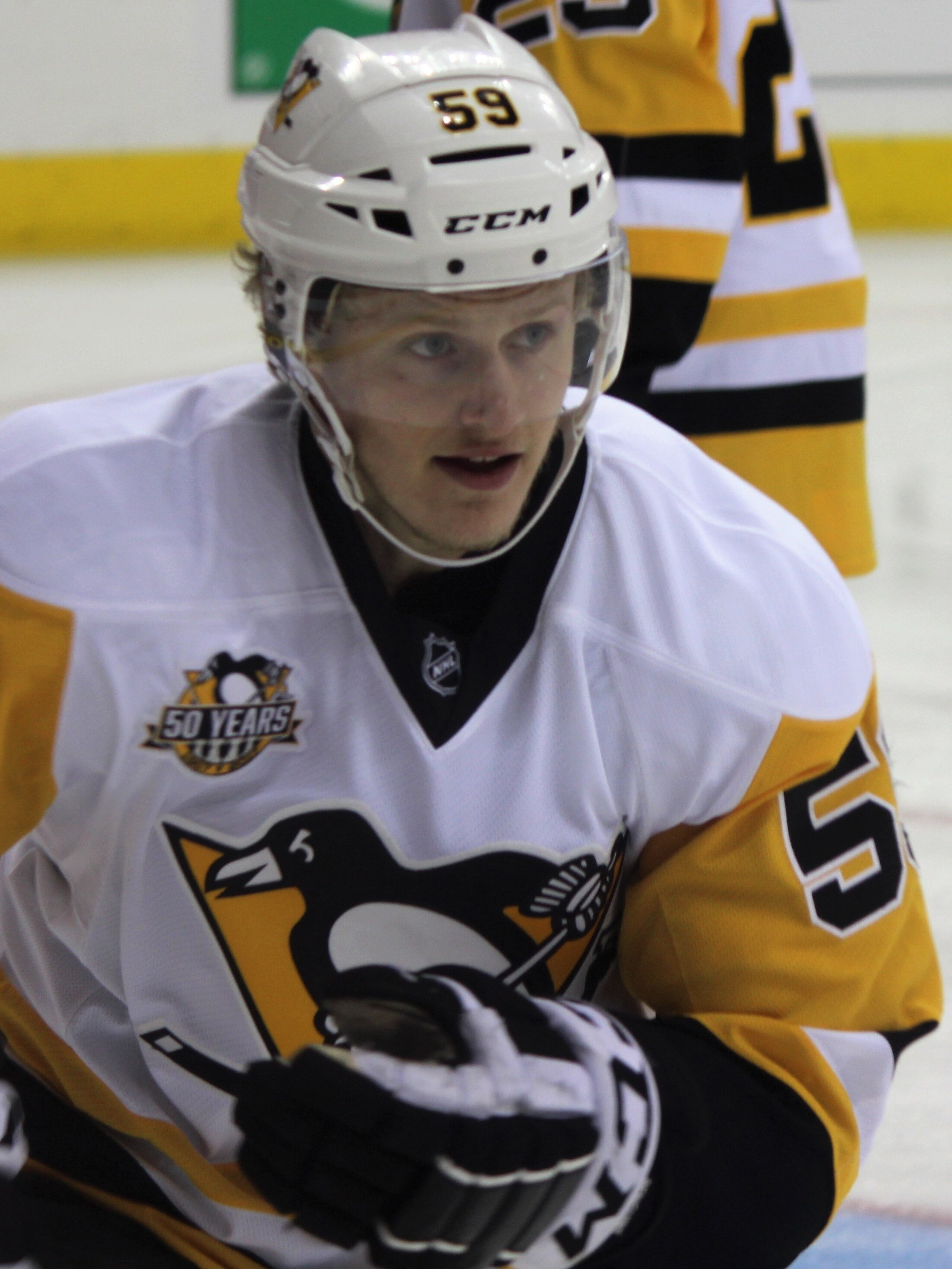
- Guentzel with the Pittsburgh Penguins in April 2017
- Born: October 6, 1994 (age 32) Omaha, Nebraska, U.S.
- Height: 5 ft 11 in (180 cm)
- Weight: 180 lb (82 kg; 12 st 12 lb)
- Position: Left wing
- Shoots: Left
- NHL team Former teams: Tampa Bay Lightning; Pittsburgh Penguins; Carolina Hurricanes
- National team: United States
- NHL draft: 77th overall, 2013; Pittsburgh Penguins
- Playing career: 2016–present

Jake Allen Guentzel (born October 6, 1994) is an American professional ice hockey player who is a left winger for the Tampa Bay Lightning of the National Hockey League (NHL). He was selected in the third round, 77th overall, by the Pittsburgh Penguins in the 2013 NHL entry draft, and won the Stanley Cup with the Penguins in 2017. Guentzel has also previously played for the Carolina Hurricanes.

== Early life ==
Guentzel was born in Omaha, Nebraska on October 6, 1994 and grew up in Woodbury, Minnesota. He played two years of varsity hockey at Hill-Murray School in Maplewood, Minnesota, with the school's team finishing second in the 2012 MN State Hockey Tournament.

== Playing career ==
=== Amateur ===
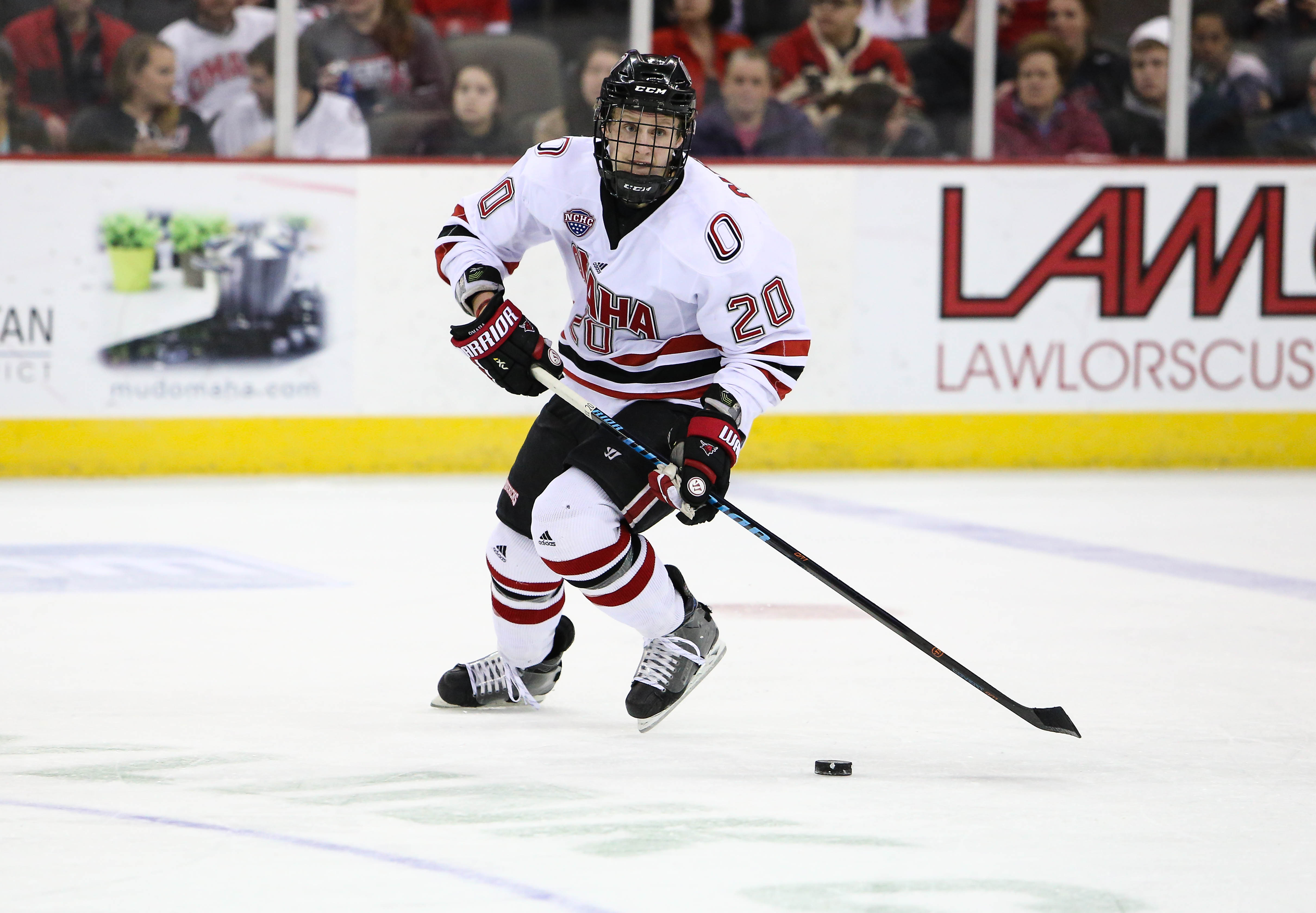
Guentzel playing for the Omaha Mavericks in March 2015

Guentzel joined the Sioux City Musketeers of the United States Hockey League (USHL) for the 2012–13 season, recording 29 goals, 44 assists for 73 points in 60 games. He finished sixth overall in the league in scoring and was voted the USHL Rookie of the Year as well as being named to the USHL All-Rookie Team. He was also named to the league's Second All-Star Team.

Guentzel committed to play for the University of Nebraska Omaha (UNO), a National Collegiate Athletic Association (NCAA) Division I college hockey program. He joined them for the 2013–14 season. In his freshman year with the Omaha Mavericks, Guentzel was named to the National Collegiate Hockey Conference (NCHC) Academic All-Conference Team, the NCHC All-Conference Rookie Team and was a finalist for NCHC Rookie of the Year. He recorded seven goals and 34 points in 37 games with the Mavericks that season. In his sophomore season in 2014–15, he helped guide the Mavericks to their first showing in the Frozen Four, scoring the team's only goal in a 4–1 loss to the Providence Friars. He finished the season with 14 goals and 39 points in 36 games as the team's leading scorer. On August 27, 2015, before Guentzel's junior year in 2015–16, he was named a co-captain along with Brian Cooper after a vote by the team. He appeared in 35 games, marking 19 goals and 46 points, finishing as the team's leading scorer for the second consecutive year. He was named an NCHC Scholar-Athlete and a member of the NCHC Academic All-Conference Team along with being named to the NCHC All-Conference Second Team. He decided to forego his senior year with UNO to turn professional.

=== Professional ===
==== Pittsburgh Penguins (2016–2024) ====
Guentzel was selected by the Pittsburgh Penguins of the National Hockey League (NHL) in the third round, 77th overall, of the 2013 NHL entry draft. He first signed an amateur tryout contract with Pittsburgh's American Hockey League (AHL) affiliate, the Wilkes-Barre/Scranton Penguins (WBS Penguins) in March 2016 and helped them qualify for the 2016 Calder Cup playoffs. He finished the regular season making 11 appearances with WBS, scoring two goals and six points. The Penguins advanced to the second round, where they were eliminated by the Hershey Bears in their best-of-seven series. In ten playoff games, Guentzel added five goals and 14 points, leading the team in playoff scoring. Guentzel signed a three-year, entry-level contract with the Pittsburgh Penguins on May 23, 2016.

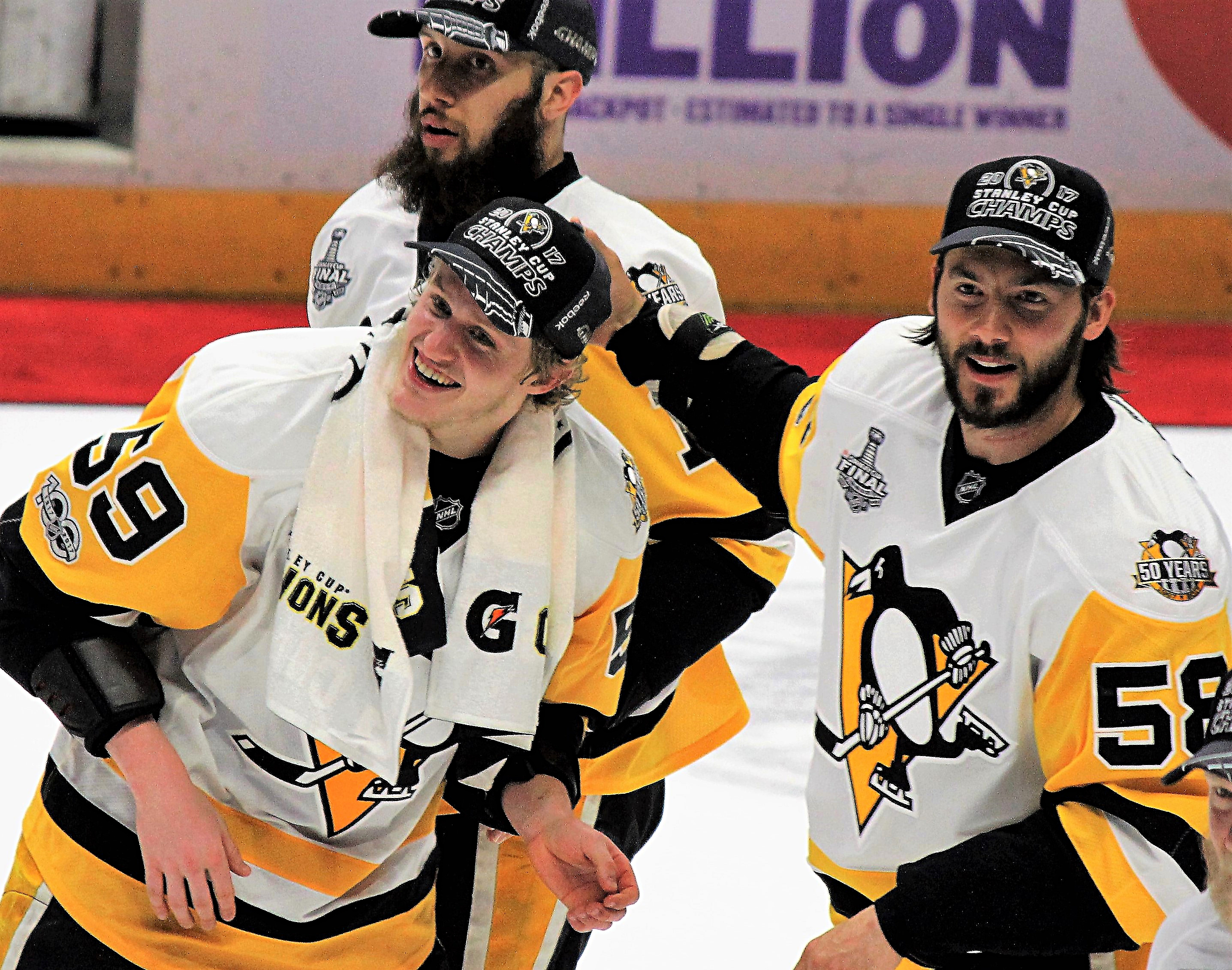
Guentzel, Nick Bonino, and Kris Letang celebrating the Penguins' Stanley Cup win in June 2017

Guentzel began the 2016–17 season in the AHL. He was recalled by Pittsburgh on November 16, 2016, after an injury to Chris Kunitz. Guentzel made his NHL debut on November 21, against the New York Rangers; he scored two goals on his first two shots. Despite this, the Penguins lost the game 5–2. He appeared in five games for Pittsburgh, recording three goals and four points before being returned to WBS on December 16. Guentzel was selected for the 2017 AHL All-Star Classic alongside teammate Tristan Jarry. Pittsburgh recalled him again on January 17, 2017, after he recorded 21 goals and 42 points in 33 games in the AHL. On March 21, Guentzel suffered a concussion on a check from Buffalo Sabres defenseman Rasmus Ristolainen. He missed the next four games, while Ristolainen was suspended by the league for three games. He finished the season with Pittsburgh, scoring 16 goals and 33 points in 40 games total. The Penguins qualified for the 2017 Stanley Cup playoffs and faced the Columbus Blue Jackets in the first round. On April 16, he scored a hat-trick, which included the game-winning goal in overtime, to put the Penguins up 3–0 in their series against the Blue Jackets. He became the first Penguins rookie to score a playoff hat-trick, and only the second rookie in NHL history to score a hat-trick and overtime goal in the same game of the playoffs. On June 11, 2017, the Penguins won the Stanley Cup after defeating the Nashville Predators in six games. During the run, Guentzel recorded 21 points, tying Dino Ciccarelli and Ville Leino for points by a rookie in a single postseason. His total of 13 goals was one shy of Ciccarelli's record. He was also named to the AHL's 2017 All-Rookie Team alongside teammate Casey DeSmith.

Guentzel began the 2017–18 season in the NHL, putting up a career high 48 points in 82 games to help the Penguins qualify for the 2018 Stanley Cup playoffs. During the first round of the playoffs, Guentzel recorded four goals in an 8–5 Game 6 win over the Philadelphia Flyers. He became the third Penguins player to record four goals in a playoff game, behind Mario Lemieux and Kevin Stevens. Advancing past the Flyers, they were eliminated by the Washington Capitals in six games in their best-of-seven series. In all 12 playoff games, Guentzel scored 10 goals and 11 assists for 21 points.

The 2018–19 season marked the last year Guentzel was on his entry level rookie contract. The Penguins began the season with a slow start, landing near the bottom of the league in early November. On November 24, 2018, Guentzel recorded his first regular season hat trick in a 4–2 win over the Columbus Blue Jackets. The following month, on December 27, the Penguins re-signed Guentzel to a five-year, $30 million contract. Guentzel recorded his second regular season hat trick in a 7–4 win over the Anaheim Ducks on January 11, 2019. His hat trick was the first by a Penguins player ever against the Anaheim Ducks. After a two-goal game the following night against the Los Angeles Kings, Guentzel was named the NHL's Third Star of the Week. He recorded a four-point game on March 2, scoring two goals and adding two assists in a 5–1 victory over the Montreal Canadiens. He finished the regular season with 40 goals and 76 points in 82 games. The Penguins made the 2019 Stanley Cup playoffs and faced the New York Islanders in the first round. However, the first line, of which Guentzel and linemate Sidney Crosby were the key components, failed to score, and the Penguins were eliminated in a four-game sweep. Guentzel scored just once in the series.

In the 2019–20 season, Guentzel put up 20 goals and 23 assists for 43 points in 39 games for the Penguins, and was voted in to play in the 2020 NHL All-Star Game. On December 30, 2019, Guentzel recorded his 200th career point as he scored a goal against the Ottawa Senators. However, immediately after scoring the goal, Guentzel tripped over the stick of Senators defenseman Thomas Chabot, and crashed shoulder first into the boards behind the net. The next day, Guentzel underwent successful shoulder surgery that sidelined him for six months. Guentzel was expected to miss the remainder of the season, but with the NHL pushing the start of the playoffs into early August due to the COVID-19 pandemic, he was able to recover and join his teammates for the postseason. Despite a healthy Guentzel available to the team, the heavily favored Penguins were upset by the Montreal Canadiens in the Qualifying Round of the tournament in four games. Guentzel recorded a goal and three points in the series.

The 2020–21 season was shortened due to the ongoing effects of the pandemic. In the 56-game season, Guentzel continued to score at a blistering pace. For the second straight season, Guenztel finished at a point-per-game production rate with 23 goals and 57 points that season. Pittsburgh once again fell to the New York Islanders in the first round of the following postseason, where he and his linemates struggled to produce. He scored only one goal and two points as the Penguins were eliminated in six games.

In the 2021–22 season, the league returned to its usual 82-game format. Although he missed the season opener against the Tampa Bay Lightning due to the NHL's COVID-19 protocol, he made his season debut against the Florida Panthers on October 14 in a 5–4 overtime loss. He once again posted high production numbers through November 2021, scoring 15 points through the Penguins' November 14 games. From November 13 against the Ottawa Senators until December 6 in the Penguins' first ever game against the expansion Seattle Kraken, Guentzel amassed a 13-game point streak where he collected a total of 12 goals and 19 points overall. In the twelfth game, he scored a hat trick and an assist against the Vancouver Canucks in a 4–1 victory. In the thirteenth game, Guentzel left the game against Seattle after blocking a shot with his right hand in the first period. Although he returned to the game and scored two goals and an assist in the 6–1 victory, the streak ended as head coach Mike Sullivan ruled him out for a few weeks on December 8.

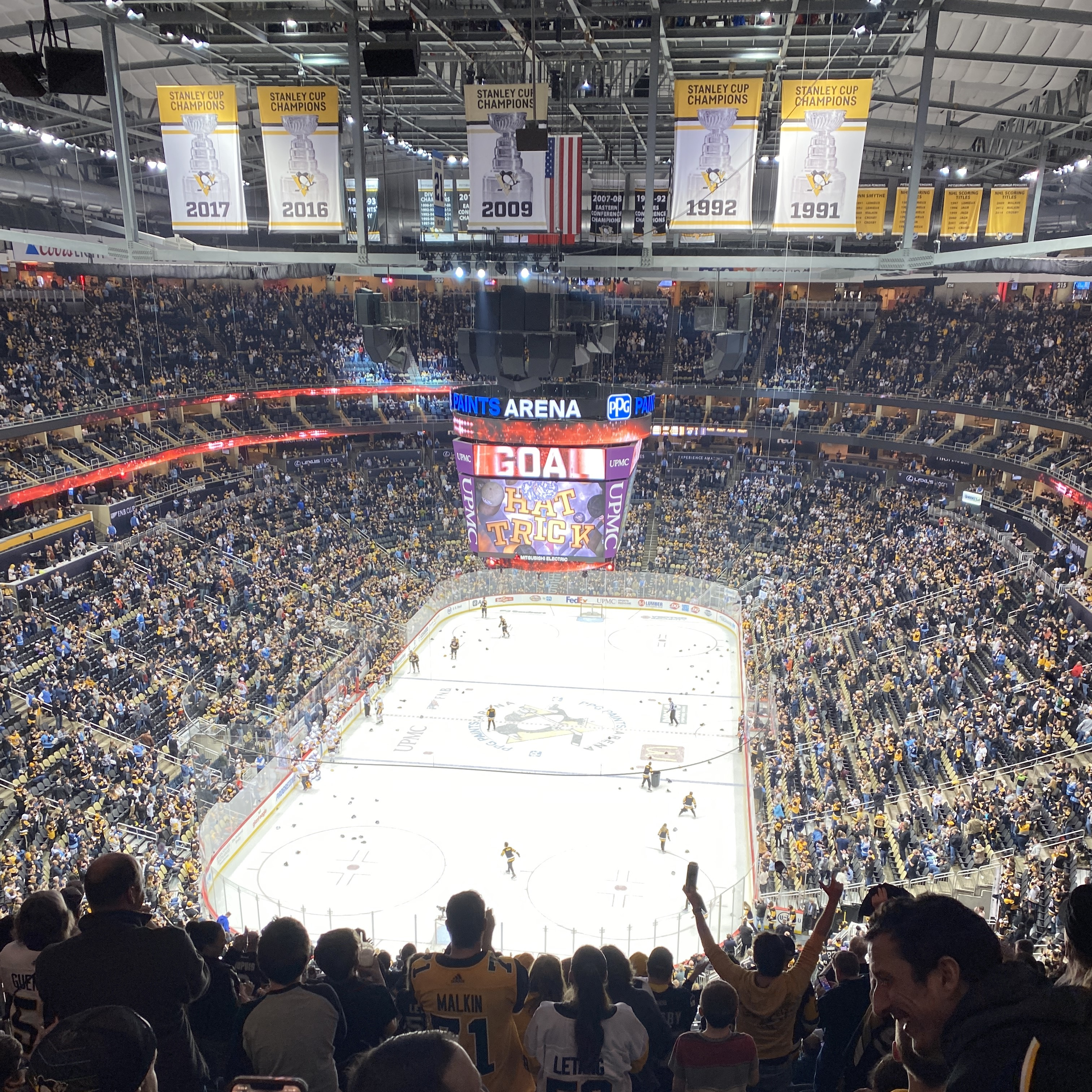
Guentzel celebrates his hat-trick against the Boston Bruins at PPG Paints Arena in April 2022

Guentzel's finish to the season was another 40-goal campaign, capped off by another hat trick against the Boston Bruins. However, despite holding a 3-1 series lead over the New York Rangers in the first round of the postseason and Guentzel's eight goals through the series, the Rangers rallied to eliminate the Penguins in seven games.

In the 2022–23 season, Guentzel remained on the Penguins first line for 78 games of the season. Guentzel fell just short of his previous season's 40-goal mark, finishing with 36 goals and 37 assists for 73 points. This season was also the first time in his career with the Penguins that he did not make a postseason appearance, as the Penguins failed to make the Stanley Cup playoffs for the first time since 2006, missing by one point.

==== Carolina Hurricanes (2024) ====
On March 7, 2024, with Guentzel injured and the Penguins struggling to win games late in the season, the team traded him to the Carolina Hurricanes, along with Ty Smith, in exchange for Michael Bunting, Ville Koivunen, prospect Cruz Lucius, Vasili Ponomaryov, and two conditional 2024 draft picks. He was activated on March 12 making his Carolina debut against the New York Rangers, and scored his first goal with the Hurricanes on March 17 against the Ottawa Senators. He finished the season with eight goals and 17 points in 25 games with the Hurricanes. The Hurricanes qualified for the 2024 Stanley Cup playoffs and faced the New York Islanders in the first round. In Game 2 of the series, he registered a goal and an assist in a 5–3 win, aiding the comeback from a 3–0 deficit in the game. The Hurricanes eliminated the Islanders to move on to the next round, to face the other team from New York, the Rangers. In Game 2 of the series against the Rangers, Guentzel scored twice, but it was not enough as the Hurricanes lost 4–3 in double overtime. Ultimately, the Rangers eliminated the Hurricanes in six games. In all 11 playoff games, he scored four goals and nine points.

==== Tampa Bay Lightning (2024–present) ====
Unable to come to extension terms with the Hurricanes with his contract expiring in the 2024 offseason, Guentzel's rights were traded to the Tampa Bay Lightning on June 30, 2024, in exchange for a third-round pick in 2025. That same day, it was announced that he signed a seven-year, $63 million contract with Tampa Bay.

== International play ==
Medal record

Men's ice hockey

Representing the United States

Olympic Games
Gold medal – first place	2026 Milano Cortina	

4 Nations Face-Off
Runner-up	2025 Canada/United States	

Guentzel was selected to play for Team USA at the 4 Nations Face-Off, a round-robin tournament held in 2025. He made his international debut against Finland in Team USA's opening game of the tournament. A 6–1 victory for the Americans, he recorded a goal and an assist in the game. In the next game against Canada, he scored two of the Americans' goals in a 3–1 win. Despite losing to Sweden in the next game, the Americans advanced to the tournament final, facing Canada. The Canadians won the game 3–2 in overtime, with Team USA finishing second in the tournament.

On January 2, 2026, he was named to Team USA's roster for the 2026 Winter Olympics. Guentzel played in four games for the Americans at the Olympics, contributing three goals and an assist as the team went on to win a gold medal. Amid backlash faced by the men's Olympic hockey team regarding the inclusion of FBI director Kash Patel during their gold medal celebrations and members of the team laughing at President Trump's comments of being impeached if he did not invite the women's team to the White House, the players were invited to the White House and the State of the Union. Guentzel did not attend the State of the Union or tour the White House. Guentzel later stated that while the request was a "dream come true to go" due to timing concerns with his family he had decided not to attend either event.

== Personal life ==
Guentzel comes from an ice hockey family. His father, Mike, was a standout athlete for Greenway High School in Coleraine, Minnesota, and subsequently played hockey for the Minnesota Golden Gophers. Later on Mike became the associate head coach at the University of Minnesota. Guentzel was a stick boy for the team when future Penguins teammate Phil Kessel played for Minnesota. His older brother, Ryan, played collegiately and professionally. Another older brother, Gabe, played in the North American Hockey League and the USHL before embarking on a four-year NCAA career at Colorado College.

Guentzel married his longtime girlfriend, Natalie Johnson, on July 30, 2021. The couple have one son.

== Career statistics ==
=== Regular season and playoffs ===
Bold indicates led league

			Regular season					Playoffs
Season	Team	League	GP	G	A	Pts	PIM	GP	G	A	Pts	PIM
2010–11	Hill-Murray School	HSMN	25	15	28	43	10	3	4	2	6	4
2011–12	Hill-Murray School	HSMN	31	23	52	75	16	3	1	4	5	0
2012–13	Sioux City Musketeers	USHL	60	29	44	73	24	—	—	—	—	—
2013–14	University of Nebraska Omaha	NCHC	37	7	27	34	16	—	—	—	—	—
2014–15	University of Nebraska Omaha	NCHC	36	14	25	39	34	—	—	—	—	—
2015–16	University of Nebraska Omaha	NCHC	35	19	27	46	20	—	—	—	—	—
2015–16	Wilkes-Barre/Scranton Penguins	AHL	11	2	4	6	0	10	5	9	14	0
2016–17	Wilkes-Barre/Scranton Penguins	AHL	33	21	21	42	12	—	—	—	—	—
2016–17	Pittsburgh Penguins	NHL	40	16	17	33	10	25	**13**	8	21	10
2017–18	Pittsburgh Penguins	NHL	82	22	26	48	42	12	10	11	21	8
2018–19	Pittsburgh Penguins	NHL	82	40	36	76	26	4	1	0	1	0
2019–20	Pittsburgh Penguins	NHL	39	20	23	43	14	4	1	2	3	0
2020–21	Pittsburgh Penguins	NHL	56	23	34	57	28	6	1	1	2	6
2021–22	Pittsburgh Penguins	NHL	76	40	44	84	44	7	8	2	10	2
2022–23	Pittsburgh Penguins	NHL	78	36	37	73	46	—	—	—	—	—
2023–24	Pittsburgh Penguins	NHL	50	22	30	52	14	—	—	—	—	—
2023–24	Carolina Hurricanes	NHL	17	8	17	25	8	11	4	5	9	16
2024–25	Tampa Bay Lightning	NHL	80	41	39	80	24	5	3	3	6	6
2025–26	Tampa Bay Lightning	NHL	81	38	50	88	61	7	2	6	8	8
NHL totals			681	306	353	659	317	81	43	38	81	56

=== International ===
Year	Team	Event	Result	GP	G	A	Pts	PIM
2025	United States	4NF	2nd	4	3	1	4	2
2026	United States	OG	1st place, gold medalist(s)	6	1	0	1	4
Senior totals				10	4	1	5	6

== Awards and honors ==
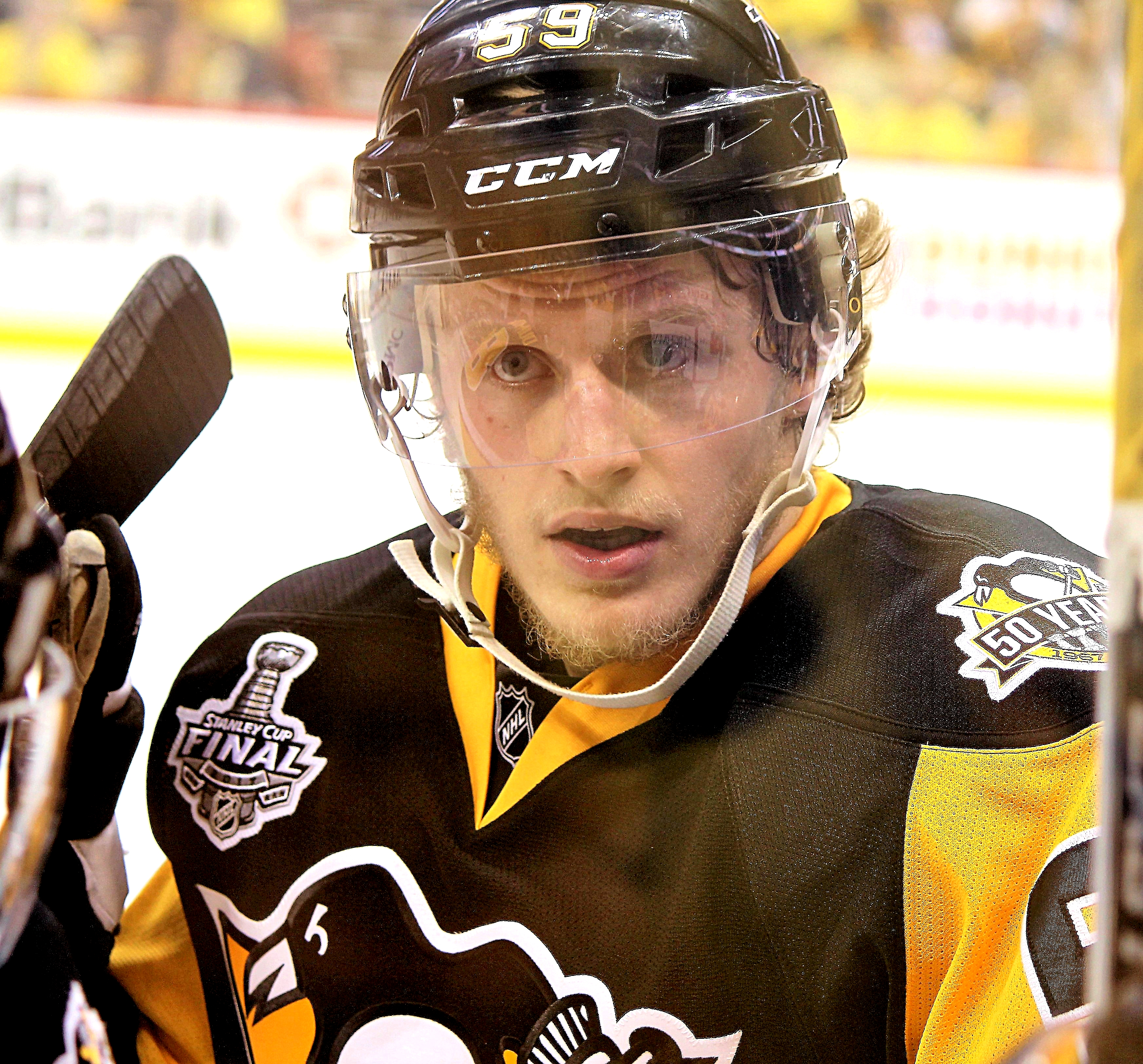
Guentzel with the Penguins during the 2017 Stanley Cup Finals.

Award	Year	Ref
USHL
USHL All-Rookie Team	2013	
USHL Rookie of the year	2013	
USHL Second all-star team	2013	
College
NCHC All-Rookie Team	2014	
AHL
AHL All-Star Classic	2017	
AHL All-Rookie Team	2017	
NHL
Stanley Cup champion	2017	
NHL All-Star Game	2020, 2022	
