= Eunice Lee (speed skater) =

American short track speed skater (born 2004)

Personal information
- Born: November 11, 2004 (age 21) San Diego, California, U.S.

Sport
- Country: United States
- Sport: Short track speed skating
Medal record
Women's short-track speed skating
Representing the United States
World Short Track Championships
Silver medal – second place	2024 Rotterdam	3000 m relay
Four Continents Championships
Bronze medal – third place	2023 Salt Lake City	3000 m relay

Eunice Lee (born November 11, 2004) is an American short track speed skater. She represented the United States at the 2022 Winter Olympics and 2026 Winter Olympics.

== Early life and education ==
Lee was born in San Diego, California and moved to South Korea at four years old and began doing rhythmic gymnastics and figure skating. She then moved to Bellevue, Washington at six years old, and her father signed her up with Puget Sound Speedskating because her older brother had joined the team.

She attends Duke University and is studying chemistry and biology.

== Career ==
Lee was named the U.S. Speedskating short track development athlete of the year in 2020. She was named to the United States roster at the 2022 Winter Olympics, as the relay team's backup, however, she did not compete. At 17 years old, she was the youngest speedskater for the United States at the Olympics, and the youngest speed skating team member since 1998.

She represented the United States at the 2023 Four Continents Short Track Speed Skating Championships and won a bronze medal in the 3000 metres relay event with a time of 4:06.964. She then represented the United States at the 2024 World Short Track Speed Skating Championships and won a silver medal in the 3000 metres relay, along with Julie Letai, Kristen Santos-Griswold and Corinne Stoddard, with a time of 4:08.061.

She missed the 2024–25 ISU Short Track World Tour due to an ankle injury and returned the following season. On December 13, 2025, she was named to team USA's roster for the 2026 Winter Olympics.
