= Slovakia at the 2026 Winter Olympics =

- Flag of Slovakia
- IOC code: SVK
- NOC: Slovak Olympic and Sports Committee
- Website: www.olympic.sk (in Slovak)

in Milan and Cortina d'Ampezzo, Italy 6 February 2026 – 22 February 2026
- Competitors: 53 (36 men and 17 women) in 11 sports
- Flag bearers (opening): Tomáš Tatar & Viktória Čerňanská
- Flag bearers (closing): Jakub Šiarnik & Rebeka Cully
- Medals: Gold 0 Silver 0 Bronze 0 Total 0

Winter Olympics appearances (overview)
- 1994; 1998; 2002; 2006; 2010; 2014; 2018; 2022; 2026

Other related appearances
- Czechoslovakia (1924–1992)

Slovakia competed at the 2026 Winter Olympics in Milan and Cortina d'Ampezzo, Italy, from 6 to 22 February 2026.

Tomáš Tatar and Viktória Čerňanská were the country's flagbearer during the opening ceremony. Meanwhile, Jakub Šiarnik and Rebeka Cully were the country's flagbearer during the closing ceremony.

For the first time since 2002, Slovakia failed to secure a single Winter Olympic medal. However, the men's ice hockey team made headlines around the world after finishing 4th in the men's ice hockey tournament.

== Competitors ==
The following is the list of number of competitors participating at the Games per sport/discipline.

Sport	Men	Women	Total
Alpine skiing	1	3	4
Biathlon	2	4	6
Bobsleigh	0	2	2
Cross-country skiing	2	1	3
Figure skating	1	0	1
Freestyle skiing	0	1	1
Ice hockey	25	0	25
Luge	3	2	5
Short-track speed skating	0	1	1
Ski jumping	1	1	2
Ski mountaineering	1	2	3
Total	36	17	53

== Alpine skiing ==
Slovakia qualified one male and three female alpine skiers through the basic and additional quota.

Athlete	Event	Run 1		Run 2		Total	
Athlete	Event	Time	Rank	Time	Rank	Time	Rank
Andreas Žampa	Men's giant slalom	1:16.64	17	1:11.80	25	2:28.44	21
Rebeka Jančová	Women's giant slalom	DNF					
Rebeka Jančová	Women's super-G	—N/a				1:28.51	21
Katarína Šrobová	Women's slalom	DNF					
Petra Vlhová	Women's slalom	49.99	29	52.71	12	1:42.70	20
Katarína Šrobová; Petra Vlhová	Women's team combined	1:46.66	26	DNF			

== Biathlon ==
Slovakia qualified two male and four female competitors through their 2024–25 Biathlon World Cup score.

Men

Athlete	Event	Time	Misses	Rank
Šimon Adamov	Individual	1:03:01.4	7 (0+4+1+2)	82
Šimon Adamov	Sprint	26:32.0	2 (1+1)	75
Jakub Borguľa	Pursuit	38:16.0	4 (1+1+1+1)	56
Jakub Borguľa	Sprint	25:55.0	1 (0+1)	58

Women

Athlete	Event	Time	Misses	Rank
Paulína Fialková	Individual	45:18.2	3 (0+1+1+1)	40
Paulína Fialková	Pursuit	32:54.1	3 (0+1+1+1)	25
Paulína Fialková	Sprint	22:50.6	3 (1+2)	40
Anastasiya Kuzmina	Individual	46:11.8	1 (0+0+1+1)	46
Anastasiya Kuzmina	Pursuit	34:45.6	5 (1+1+2+1)	49
Anastasiya Kuzmina	Sprint	22:40.6	1 (0+1)	36
Mária Remeňová	Individual	50:01.7	4 (2+2+0+2)	82
Mária Remeňová	Pursuit	34:01.5	2 (0+1+0+1)	38
Mária Remeňová	Sprint	23:01.8	1 (1+0)	51
Ema Kapustová	Individual	46:14.3	1 (1+0+0+0)	48
Ema Kapustová	Pursuit	35:07.3	4 (1+1+2+0)	52
Ema Kapustová	Sprint	23:03.5	1 (0+1)	53
Paulína Fialková; Anastasiya Kuzmina; Ema Kapustová; Mária Remeňová	Team relay	1:14:03.5	0 (0+10)	10

Mixed

Athlete	Event	Time	Misses	Rank
Anastasiya Kuzmina; Paulína Fialková; Jakub Borguľa; Šimon Adamov	Relay	1:09:06.5	12 (1+11)	19

== Bobsleigh ==
Slovakia qualified two female athletes through quota alocation.

Athlete	Event	Run 1		Run 2		Run 3		Run 4		Total	
Athlete	Event	Time	Rank	Time	Rank	Time	Rank	Time	Rank	Time	Rank
Viktória Čerňanská	Women's monobob	1:00.83	21	1:00.81	20	1:00.55	20	1:00.65	19	4:02.84	20
Viktória Čerňanská; Lucia Mokrášová	Two-woman	57.94	18	57.86	15	58.58	21	58.31	19	3:52.69	19

== Cross-country skiing ==
Slovakia qualified two male and one female cross-country skier through the basic quota. Following the completion of the 2024–25 FIS Cross-Country World Cup, Slovakia qualified a further one male athlete.

Distance

Athlete	Event	Classical		Freestyle		Final		
Athlete	Event	Time	Rank	Time	Rank	Time	Deficit	Rank
Peter Hinds	Men's 10 km freestyle	—N/a		23:40.8	64	—N/a		
Peter Hinds	Men's 20 km skiathlon	27:24.8	63	25:46.8	52	53:44.7	+7:33.7	60
Peter Hinds	Men's 50 km classical	2:25:05.5	38	—N/a				
Tomáš Cenek	Men's 10 km freestyle	—N/a		26:07.9	90	—N/a		
Mária Danielová	Women's 10 km freestyle	—N/a		31:20.8	102	—N/a		

Sprint

Athlete	Event	Qualification		Quarterfinals		Semifinals		Final	
Athlete	Event	Time	Rank	Time	Rank	Time	Rank	Time	Rank
Peter Hinds	Men's sprint	3:25.78	49	Did not advance					
Tomáš Cenek	Men's sprint	3:28.34	58	Did not advance					
Mária Danielová	Women's sprint	4:08.27	60	Did not advance					
Tomáš Cenek; Peter Hinds	Men's team sprint	6:15.18	20	—N/a				Did not advance	

== Figure skating ==
In the 2025 World Figure Skating Championships in Boston, the United States, Slovakia secured one quota in each of the men's singles.

Athlete	Event	SP/SD		FP/FD		Total	
Athlete	Event	Points	Rank	Points	Rank	Points	Rank
Adam Hagara	Men's singles	80.30	20 Q	122.08	24	202.38	24

== Freestyle skiing ==
Ski cross

Athlete	Event	Seeding		Round of 16	Quarterfinal	Semifinal	Final	
Athlete	Event	Time	Rank	Position	Position	Position	Position	Rank
Nikola Fričová	Women's ski cross	1:20.24	28	4	Did not advance			28

== Ice hockey ==
Summary

Key:

- OT – Overtime
- GWS – Match decided by penalty-shootout

Team	Event	Group stage				Qualification playoff	Quarterfinal	Semifinal	Final / BM	
Team	Event	Opposition Score	Opposition Score	Opposition Score	Rank	Opposition Score	Opposition Score	Opposition Score	Opposition Score	Rank
Slovakia men's	Men's tournament	Finland; W 4–1	Italy; W 3–2	Sweden; L 5–3	1 Q	Bye	Germany; W 6–2	United States; L 2–6	Finland; L 1–6	4th

=== Men's tournament ===
Slovakia men's national ice hockey team qualified a team of 25 players by winning a final qualification tournament.

Roster

The first six players of Slovakia's roster were announced on 16 June 2025. The remainder of the roster was named on 8 January 2026. On 28 January 2026, Marek Hrivík was ruled out due to injury, and replaced by Lukáš Cingel. On 9 February, Tomáš Tatar was named Slovakia's captain, with Erik Černák and Martin Fehérváry serving as alternate captains.

Head coach: Vladimír Országh

No.	Pos.	Name	Height	Weight	Birthdate	Team
6	F	Lukáš Cingel	1.88 m (6 ft 2 in)	90 kg (198 lb)	10 June 1992 (aged 33)	(Czech Republic) Kometa Brno
8	F	Oliver Okuliar	1.88 m (6 ft 2 in)	86 kg (190 lb)	24 May 2000 (aged 25)	(Sweden) Skellefteå AIK
11	F	Miloš Kelemen	1.85 m (6 ft 1 in)	97 kg (214 lb)	6 July 1999 (aged 26)	(Czech Republic) Dynamo Pardubice
14	D	Peter Čerešňák	1.91 m (6 ft 3 in)	98 kg (216 lb)	26 January 1993 (aged 33)	(Czech Republic) Dynamo Pardubice
15	F	Dalibor Dvorský	1.85 m (6 ft 1 in)	93 kg (205 lb)	15 July 2005 (aged 20)	(United States) St. Louis Blues
17	D	Šimon Nemec	1.83 m (6 ft 0 in)	94 kg (207 lb)	15 February 2004 (aged 21)	(United States) New Jersey Devils
20	F	Juraj Slafkovský	1.93 m (6 ft 4 in)	103 kg (227 lb)	30 March 2004 (aged 21)	(Canada) Montreal Canadiens
21	F	Adam Ružička	1.93 m (6 ft 4 in)	104 kg (229 lb)	11 May 1999 (aged 26)	(Russia) Spartak Moscow
23	F	Adam Liška	1.80 m (5 ft 11 in)	84 kg (185 lb)	14 October 1999 (aged 26)	(Russia) Severstal Cherepovets
28	D	Martin Gernát	1.93 m (6 ft 4 in)	94 kg (207 lb)	11 April 1993 (aged 32)	(Russia) Lokomotiv Yaroslavl
29	D	Michal Ivan	1.85 m (6 ft 1 in)	90 kg (198 lb)	8 November 1999 (aged 26)	(Czech Republic) Bílí Tygři Liberec
30	G	Adam Gajan	1.91 m (6 ft 3 in)	82 kg (181 lb)	6 May 2004 (aged 21)	(United States) Minnesota Duluth Bulldogs
31	G	Samuel Hlavaj	1.93 m (6 ft 4 in)	99 kg (218 lb)	29 May 2001 (aged 24)	(United States) Iowa Wild
33	G	Stanislav Škorvánek	1.88 m (6 ft 2 in)	88 kg (194 lb)	31 January 1996 (aged 30)	(Czech Republic) Mountfield HK
34	F	Peter Cehlárik	1.88 m (6 ft 2 in)	94 kg (207 lb)	2 August 1995 (aged 30)	(Sweden) Leksands IF
42	D	Martin Fehérváry – A	1.88 m (6 ft 2 in)	95 kg (209 lb)	6 October 1999 (aged 26)	(United States) Washington Capitals
49	F	Samuel Takáč	1.83 m (6 ft 0 in)	92 kg (203 lb)	3 December 1991 (aged 34)	(Slovakia) Slovan Bratislava
52	D	Martin Marinčin	1.96 m (6 ft 5 in)	95 kg (209 lb)	18 February 1992 (aged 33)	(Czech Republic) Oceláři Třinec
64	D	Patrik Koch	1.85 m (6 ft 1 in)	86 kg (190 lb)	8 December 1996 (aged 29)	(Czech Republic) Oceláři Třinec
76	F	Martin Pospíšil	1.88 m (6 ft 2 in)	94 kg (207 lb)	19 November 1999 (aged 26)	(Canada) Calgary Flames
79	F	Libor Hudáček	1.78 m (5 ft 10 in)	80 kg (176 lb)	7 September 1990 (aged 35)	(Czech Republic) Oceláři Třinec
81	D	Erik Černák – A	1.93 m (6 ft 4 in)	103 kg (227 lb)	28 May 1997 (aged 28)	(United States) Tampa Bay Lightning
84	F	Pavol Regenda	1.93 m (6 ft 4 in)	102 kg (225 lb)	7 December 1999 (aged 26)	(United States) San Jose Sharks
90	F	Tomáš Tatar – C	1.78 m (5 ft 10 in)	82 kg (181 lb)	1 December 1990 (aged 35)	(Switzerland) EV Zug
91	F	Matúš Sukeľ	1.75 m (5 ft 9 in)	77 kg (170 lb)	23 January 1996 (aged 30)	(Czech Republic) HC Litvínov

Group play

Pos	Team	Pld	W	OTW	OTL	L	GF	GA	GD	Pts	Qualification
1	Slovakia	3	2	0	0	1	10	8	+2	6 (Note: Head-to-head points: 3 each. Head-to-head goal difference: Slovakia +1; Finland 0; Sweden −1.)	Advance to quarterfinals
2	Finland	3	2	0	0	1	16	5	+11	6	Advance to quarterfinals
3	Sweden	3	2	0	0	1	11	9	+2	6	Advance to qualification playoffs
4	Italy (H)	3	0	0	0	3	4	19	−15	0	Advance to qualification playoffs

Source: IIHF
Rules for classification: Tiebreak criteria
(H) Host
Notes:

11 February 2026; 16:40	Slovakia	4–1 (1–0, 0–1, 3–0)	Finland	PalaItalia, Milan; Attendance: 11,025

Game reference

Samuel Hlavaj
Goalies
Juuse Saros
Referees:
(Canada) Eric Furlatt
(United States) Sean MacFarlane
Linesmen:
(United States) Ryan Daisy
(Canada) Tarrington Wyonzek

Slafkovský – 07:45	1–0
	1–1	24:15 – Tolvanen (Armia, Lehkonen)
Dvorský (Gernát, Liška) – 47:20	2–1
Slafkovský (Nemec, Dvorský) (PP) – 50:30	3–1
Ružička (Tatar, Slafkovský) (EN) – 57:39	4–1

4 min
Penalties
4 min
25
Shots
40

13 February 2026; 12:10	Italy	2–3 (0–0, 1–2, 1–1)	Slovakia	Fiera Milano, Milan; Attendance: 3,986

Game reference

Davide Fadani
Damian Clara
Goalies
Stanislav Škorvánek
Referees:
(United States) Brian Pochmara
(Germany) André Schrader
Linesmen:
(United States) Nick Briganti
(United States) Jonny Murray

	0–1	23:51 – Hudáček (Slafkovský, Dvorský) (PP)
	0–2	33:45 – Sukeľ (Liška, Cingel)
Bradley (Pietroniro, Gazley) (PP) – 37:06	1–2
	1–3	51:54 – Ružička (Regenda, Gernát)
Gazley (Larkin, Pietroniro) (EA) – 56:25	2–3

12 min
Penalties
12 min
22
Shots
38

14 February 2026; 12:10	Sweden	5–3 (1–1, 2–1, 2–1)	Slovakia	PalaItalia, Milan; Attendance: 11,332

Game reference

Jacob Markström
Goalies
Samuel Hlavaj
Referees:
(Latvia) Andris Ansons
(United States) Kyle Rehman
Linesmen:
(Czech Republic) Daniel Hynek
(Czech Republic) Libor Suchánek

Eriksson Ek (Kempe) (SH) – 07:17	1–0
	1–1	08:59 – Slafkovský (Nemec, Gernát)
Kempe (Dahlin, Raymond) (PP) – 27:06	2–1
	2–2	29:48 – Gernát (Čerešňák, Ružička)
Pettersson (Forsberg, Hedman) – 34:29	3–2
Pettersson (Raymond, Karlsson) – 47:57	4–2
Raymond (Zibanejad, Karlsson) – 51:38	5–2
	5–3	59:21 – Dvorský (Slafkovský, Čerešňák) (PP)

14 min
Penalties
14 min
51
Shots
32

Quarterfinals

18 February 2026; 12:10	Slovakia	6–2 (1–0, 3–1, 2–1)	Germany	PalaItalia, Milan; Attendance: 9,532

Game reference

Samuel Hlavaj
Goalies
Philipp Grubauer
Referees:
(Canada) Dan O'Rourke
(United States) Kyle Rehman
Linesmen:
(Denmark) Albert Ankerstjerne
(Canada) Matt MacPherson

Regenda (Černák, Fehérváry) – 18:06	1–0
Kelemen (Regenda) – 24:01	2–0
Okuliar (Hudáček, Dvorský) – 24:34	3–0
	3–1	34:59 – Reichel (Draisaitl)
Dvorský (Okuliar, Koch) – 30:21	4–1
Regenda (Koch, Pospíšil) – 40:58	5–1
	5–2	49:09 – Tiffels (Reichel, Müller) (PP)
Tatar (Ružička, Slafkovský) (EN) – 56:33	6–2

8 min
Penalties
6 min
35
Shots
27

Semifinal

20 February 2026; 21:10	United States	6–2 (2–0, 3–0, 1–2)	Slovakia	PalaItalia, Milan; Attendance: 11,240

Game reference

Connor Hellebuyck
Goalies
Samuel Hlavaj
Stanislav Škorvánek
Referees:
(Canada) Gord Dwyer
(United States) Chris Rooney
Linesmen:
(Canada) Scott Cherrey
(Finland) Onni Hautamäki

Larkin (Werenski, Thompson) – 04:19	1–0
Thompson (Eichel, Q. Hughes) (PP) – 19:19	2–0
J. Hughes (Werenzki) – 32:14	3–0
Eichel (B. Tkachuk, M. Tkachuk) – 32:33	4–0
J. Hughes (Werenski, Boldy) – 38:24	5–0
	5–1	44:55 – Slafkovský (Ružička, Fehérváry)
B. Tkachuk (Trocheck, Hanifin) – 50:52	6–1
	6–2	53:17 – Regenda (Kelemen, Fehérváry)

30 min
Penalties
20 min
39
Shots
24

Bronze medal match

21 February 2026; 20:40	Slovakia	1–6 (0–1, 1–1, 0–4)	Finland	PalaItalia, Milan; Attendance: 10,522

Game reference

Samuel Hlavaj
Goalies
Juuse Saros
Referees:
(Canada) Michael Campbell
(Sweden) Michael Holm
Linesmen:
(Czech Republic) Daniel Hynek
(Czech Republic) Libor Suchánek

	0–1	07:27 – Aho (Lehkonen, Heiskanen)
	0–2	28:05 – Haula (Armia, Tolvanen)
Tatar (Fehérváry) – 39:30	1–2
	1–3	48:27 – Hintz (Heiskanen, Tolvanen) (PP)
	1–4	49:09 – Kakko
	1–5	55:32 – Armia (Hintz) (EN)
	1–6	58:42 – Haula (Armia, Ristolainen) (EN)

6 min
Penalties
4 min
31
Shots
35

== Luge ==
Based on the results from the Olympic test event and the fall World Cups during the 2025–26 Luge World Cup season, Slovakia earned the following start quotas:

Athlete	Event	Run 1		Run 2		Run 3		Run 4		Total	
Athlete	Event	Time	Rank	Time	Rank	Time	Rank	Time	Rank	Time	Rank
Jozef Ninis	Men's singles	53.986	19	54.097	20	53.824	18	53.693	15	3:35.600	19
Christián Bosman; Bruno Mick	Men's doubles	53.121	13	53.004	12	—N/a				1:46.125	12
Viktória Praxová; Desana Špitzová	Women's doubles	56.227	11	55.286	11	—N/a				1:51.513	11

== Short-track speed skating ==
Slovakia qualified one female short-track speed skater after the conclusion of the 2025–26 ISU Short Track World Tour.

Athlete	Event	Heat		Quarterfinal		Semifinal		Final	
Athlete	Event	Time	Rank	Time	Rank	Time	Rank	Time	Rank
Lea Popovičová	Women's 500 m	46.101	4	Did not advance					

== Ski jumping ==
Slovakia qualified one male and one female athlete through quota.

Men

Athlete	Event	First round			Final			Total	
Athlete	Event	Distance	Points	Rank	Distance	Points	Rank	Points	Rank
Hektor Kapustík	Normal hill	102.0	124.6	22	95.5	121.1	28	245.7	28
Hektor Kapustík	Large hill	131.5	121.2	30	132.0	127.1	17	248.3	=21

Women

Athlete	Event	First round			Final			Total	
Athlete	Event	Distance	Points	Rank	Distance	Points	Rank	Points	Rank
Kira Mária Kapustíková	Normal hill	89.0	100.9	41	Did not advance				
Kira Mária Kapustíková	Large hill	105.5	79.7	43	Did not advance				

== Ski mountaineering ==
Slovakia qualified two female and one male ski mountaineer through the Olympic ranking lists.

Athlete	Event	Heat		Semifinal		Final	
Athlete	Event	Time	Rank	Time	Rank	Time	Rank
Jakub Šiarnik	Men's sprint	3:02.29	6	Did not advance			18
Rebeka Cully	Women's sprint	3:31.24	6	Did not advance			16
Marianna Jagerčíková	Women's sprint	3:15.32	3 Q	3:26.80	6	Did not advance	11
Jakub Šiarnik; Marianna Jagerčíková	Mixed relay	—N/a				30:36.23	11

== See also ==
- Slovakia at the 2026 Winter Paralympics
