= Biathlon at the 2026 Winter Olympics – Mixed relay =

Mixed relay at the XXV Olympic Winter Games
- Biathlon
- Venue: Anterselva Biathlon Arena
- Date: 8 February 2026
- Competitors: 84 from 21 nations
- Teams: 21
- Winning time: 1:04:15.5

Medalists
1st place, gold medalist(s)		Éric Perrot; Quentin Fillon Maillet; Lou Jeanmonnot; Julia Simon	France
2nd place, silver medalist(s)		Tommaso Giacomel; Lukas Hofer; Dorothea Wierer; Lisa Vittozzi	Italy
3rd place, bronze medalist(s)		Justus Strelow; Philipp Nawrath; Vanessa Voigt; Franziska Preuß	Germany

The mixed relay competition of the 2026 Winter Olympics was held on 8 February, at the Anterselva Biathlon Arena in Rasen-Antholz. France won the event, with Italy second and Germany third.

== Background ==
The 2022 champions were Norway, and the silver medalists were France. The bronze medalist, Russian Olympic Committee, were barred from participation in 2026 due to the military aggression of Russia against Ukraine. Prior to the Olympics, there were only two mixed relay competitions with four legs in the 2025–26 Biathlon World Cup. One was won by France and another one by Italy. France were also the 2025 World champions.

== Summary ==
For most of the distance, France, Italy, Germany and Norway were skiing together or close to each other. Before the 2nd shooting of the 4th leg, they were all still in medal contention. At the last shooting, Franziska Preuß of Germany got a penalty and Maren Kirkeeide of Norway got two penalties, and thus Germany went for the bronze, and Norway dropped out of medal contention. France was ahead of Italy, and Julia Simon of France was skiing faster than Lisa Vittozzi of Italy, thus winning gold for France. Italy was left second.

== Results ==
The race was started at 14:05.

Rank	Bib	Country	Time	Penalties (P+S)	Deficit
1st place, gold medalist(s)	1	France Éric Perrot; Quentin Fillon Maillet; Lou Jeanmonnot; Julia Simon	1:04:15.5; 14:31.8; 15:12.9; 16:41.1; 17:49.7	0+4 0+3; 0+0 0+1; 0+3 0+2; 0+1 0+0; 0+0 0+0	
2nd place, silver medalist(s)	2	Italy Tommaso Giacomel; Lukas Hofer; Dorothea Wierer; Lisa Vittozzi	1:04:41.3; 14:34.8; 15:10.2; 17:00.0; 17:56.3	0+0 0+5; 0+0 0+2; 0+0 0+2; 0+0 0+1; 0+0 0+0	+25.8
3rd place, bronze medalist(s)	9	Germany Justus Strelow; Philipp Nawrath; Vanessa Voigt; Franziska Preuß	1:05:20.8; 14:41.4; 14:47.5; 17:15.7; 18:36.2	0+0 1+3; 0+0 0+0; 0+0 0+0; 0+0 0+0; 0+0 1+3	+1:05.3
4	4	Norway Martin Uldal; Vetle Sjåstad Christiansen; Karoline Offigstad Knotten; Maren Kirkeeide	1:05:52.7; 14:28.6; 14:54.9; 17:20.7; 19:08.5	0+2 2+4; 0+0 0+0; 0+0 0+1; 0+2 0+0; 0+0 2+3	+1:37.2
5	6	Sweden Sebastian Samuelsson; Martin Ponsiluoma; Anna Magnusson; Hanna Öberg	1:05:56.3; 15:52.9; 15:14.1; 17:06.5; 17:42.8	0+3 2+4; 0+0 2+3; 0+2 0+0; 0+1 0+0; 0+0 0+1	+1:40.8
6	7	Finland Olli Hiidensalo; Tero Seppälä; Inka Hämäläinen; Suvi Minkkinen	1:06:12.0; 14:46.1; 15:36.0; 17:52.5; 17:57.4	0+2 0+5; 0+0 0+0; 0+1 0+3; 0+1 0+2; 0+0 0+0	+1:56.5
7	8	Austria Dominic Unterweger; Simon Eder; Anna Gandler; Lisa Theresa Hauser	1:06:36.5; 15:07.9; 15:21.8; 17:38.7; 18:28.1	0+3 0+3; 0+0 0+1; 0+0 0+0; 0+1 0+0; 0+2 0+2	+2:21.0
8	14	Ukraine Dmytro Pidruchnyi; Vitalii Mandzyn; Olena Horodna; Oleksandra Merkushyna	1:06:52.1; 15:04.7; 15:03.5; 18:00.6; 18:43.3	0+1 0+7; 0+1 0+3; 0+0 0+1; 0+0 0+1; 0+0 0+2	+2:36.6
9	13	Poland Konrad Badacz; Jan Guńka; Kamila Żuk; Natalia Sidorowicz	1:07:12.4; 14:48.0; 16:17.2; 17:52.4; 18:14.8	0+8 1+5; 0+1 0+0; 0+3 1+3; 0+3 0+1; 0+2 0+0	+2:56.9
10	12	Switzerland Sebastian Stalder; Niklas Hartweg; Lea Meier; Amy Baserga	1:07:14.0; 15:07.0; 15:19.5; 18:42.4; 18:05.1	1+4 0+3; 0+0 0+0; 0+1 0+3; 1+3 0+0; 0+0 0+0	+2:58.5
11	3	Czech Republic Vítězslav Hornig; Michal Krčmář; Tereza Voborníková; Markéta Davidová	1:07:17.2; 14:58.8; 15:01.4; 17:17.4; 19:59.6	0+2 1+4; 0+0 0+0; 0+0 0+1; 0+0 0+0; 0+2 1+3	+3:01.7
12	17	Latvia Andrejs Rastorgujevs; Renārs Birkentāls; Baiba Bendika; Estere Volfa	1:07:28.5; 14:51.2; 15:59.3; 17:30.1; 19:07.9	0+1 2+8; 0+0 0+1; 0+0 1+3; 0+1 0+1; 0+0 1+3	+3:13.0
13	10	Slovenia Anton Vidmar; Lovro Planko; Lena Repinc; Polona Klemenčič	1:07:40.9; 15:58.5; 16:06.4; 17:34.0; 18:02.0	0+3 2+8; 0+1 1+3; 0+0 1+3; 0+0 0+1; 0+2 0+1	+3:25.4
14	5	United States Maxime Germain; Campbell Wright; Deedra Irwin; Margie Freed	1:07:43.2; 15:04.2; 16:02.5; 17:39.4; 18:57.1	1+6 0+7; 0+1 0+2; 1+3 0+3; 0+0 0+1; 0+2 0+1	+3:27.7
15	15	Estonia Rene Zahkna; Kristo Siimer; Susan Külm; Regina Ermits	1:07:45.3; 15:20.3; 15:50.6; 17:57.6; 18:36.8	0+5 0+0; 0+2 0+0; 0+2 0+0; 0+1 0+0; 0+0 0+0	+3:29.8
16	21	Bulgaria Blagoy Todev; Vladimir Iliev; Lora Hristova; Milena Todorova	1:07:46.0; 16:00.5; 16:06.1; 17:30.6; 18:08.8	0+8 0+7; 0+1 0+3; 0+3 0+3; 0+1 0+1; 0+3 0+0	+3:30.5
17	16	Canada Adam Runnalls; Jasper Fleming; Pascale Paradis; Nadia Moser	1:08:37.1; 15:03.8; 17:07.6; 17:45.7; 18:40.0	1+6 0+6; 0+0 0+0; 1+3 0+3; 0+2 0+1; 0+1 0+2	+4:21.6
18	20	Belgium Florent Claude; Thierry Langer; Lotte Lie; Maya Cloetens	1:09:00.4; 15:07.5; 16:49.5; 18:44.9; 18:18.5	0+3 0+5; 0+0 0+2; 0+3 0+3; 0+0 0+0; 0+0 0+0	+4:44.9
19	11	Slovakia Jakub Borguľa; Šimon Adamov; Paulína Bátovská Fialková; Anastasiya Kuzmina	1:09:06.5; 16:04.4; 16:24.8; 17:17.6; 19:19.7	0+5 0+6; 0+0 0+1; 0+1 0+2; 0+1 0+1; 0+3 0+2	+4:51.0
20	18	Lithuania Vytautas Strolia; Nikita Čigak; Judita Traubaitė; Lidija Žurauskaitė	1:11:29.1; 15:26.0; 16:20.9; 18:53.6; 20:48.6	0+8 2+8; 0+1 0+3; 0+3 0+1; 0+3 0+1; 0+1 2+3	+7:13.6
21	19	Kazakhstan Vladislav Kireyev; Asset Dyussenov; Milana Geneva; Aisha Rakisheva	LAP; 15:05.6; 15:48.3; 19:36.4; LAP	1+7 0+6; 0+0 0+2; 0+2 0+1; 0+2 0+3; 1+3	
