= Biathlon at the 2026 Winter Olympics – Men's sprint =

Men's sprint at the XXV Olympic Winter Games
- Biathlon
- Venue: Anterselva Biathlon Arena
- Date: 13 February 2026
- Competitors: 90 from 28 nations
- Winning time: 22:53.1

Medalists
1st place, gold medalist(s)		Quentin Fillon Maillet	France
2nd place, silver medalist(s)		Vetle Sjåstad Christiansen	Norway
3rd place, bronze medalist(s)		Sturla Holm Lægreid	Norway

The men's sprint competition of the 2026 Winter Olympics was held on 13 February, at the Anterselva Biathlon Arena in Rasen-Antholz. Quentin Fillon Maillet of France won the event, Vetle Sjåstad Christiansen of Norway came second, and his teammate Sturla Holm Lægreid third.

== Background ==
The 2022 champion Johannes Thingnes Bø and the bronze medalist Tarjei Bø retired from competitions. The silver medalist, Quentin Fillon Maillet, was in the field, after finishing 8th in the individual. Prior to the Olympics, Éric Perrot was leading the total and Tommaso Giacomel the sprint standings of the 2025–26 Biathlon World Cup. The 2025 World champion was Johannes Thingnes Bø.

== Results ==
The race was started at 14:00.

Rank	Bib	Name	Country	Time	Penalties (P+S)	Deficit
1st place, gold medalist(s)	40	Quentin Fillon Maillet	France	22:53.1	0 (0+0)	
2nd place, silver medalist(s)	60	Vetle Sjåstad Christiansen	Norway	23:06.8	0 (0+0)	+13.7
3rd place, bronze medalist(s)	56	Sturla Holm Lægreid	Norway	23:09.0	0 (0+0)	+15.9
4	42	Émilien Jacquelin	France	23:09.2	0 (0+0)	+16.1
5	44	Sebastian Samuelsson	Sweden	23:18.1	0 (0+0)	+25.0
6	64	Johannes Dale-Skjevdal	Norway	23:36.1	2 (0+2)	+43.0
7	50	Martin Ponsiluoma	Sweden	23:39.8	2 (1+1)	+46.7
8	58	Johan-Olav Botn	Norway	23:51.3	1 (1+0)	+58.2
9	48	Éric Perrot	France	23:55.2	2 (1+1)	+1:02.1
10	36	Philipp Horn	Germany	24:02.3	1 (0+1)	+1:09.2
11	15	Olli Hiidensalo	Finland	24:02.4	0 (0+0)	+1:09.3
12	54	Campbell Wright	United States	24:03.1	1 (1+0)	+1:10.0
13	46	Lukas Hofer	Italy	24:15.2	1 (0+1)	+1:22.1
14	22	Joscha Burkhalter	Switzerland	24:15.4	0 (0+0)	+1:22.3
15	27	Sebastian Stalder	Switzerland	24:26.8	0 (0+0)	+1:33.7
16	53	Nicola Romanin	Italy	24:27.5	0 (0+0)	+1:34.4
17	41	Niklas Hartweg	Switzerland	24:32.0	2 (0+2)	+1:38.9
18	34	Tero Seppälä	Finland	24:34.1	2 (1+1)	+1:41.0
19	20	David Zobel	Germany	24:34.9	0 (0+0)	+1:41.8
20	38	Vítězslav Hornig	Czech Republic	24:35.2	1 (1+0)	+1:42.1
21	74	Tuomas Harjula	Finland	24:36.4	1 (0+1)	+1:43.3
22	62	Tommaso Giacomel	Italy	24:36.5	3 (2+1)	+1:43.4
23	30	Justus Strelow	Germany	24:39.5	1 (0+1)	+1:46.4
24	16	Vitalii Mandzyn	Ukraine	24:40.5	1 (0+1)	+1:47.4
25	33	Jakov Fak	Slovenia	24:45.2	1 (0+1)	+1:52.1
26	52	Philipp Nawrath	Germany	24:46.0	3 (2+1)	+1:52.9
27	21	Dmytro Pidruchnyi	Ukraine	24:47.9	2 (1+1)	+1:54.8
28	26	Michal Krčmář	Czech Republic	24:49.9	2 (0+2)	+1:56.8
29	47	Jan Guńka	Poland	24:50.5	1 (1+0)	+1:57.4
30	51	Andrejs Rastorgujevs	Latvia	24:56.9	1 (0+1)	+2:03.8
31	77	Adam Runnalls	Canada	25:02.5	1 (0+1)	+2:09.4
32	85	Rihards Lozbers	Latvia	25:05.2	2 (1+1)	+2:12.1
33	4	Tomáš Mikyska	Czech Republic	25:05.3	1 (1+0)	+2:12.2
34	37	Lovro Planko	Slovenia	25:06.0	3 (2+1)	+2:12.9
35	17	Anton Vidmar	Slovenia	25:10.0	2 (0+2)	+2:16.9
36	79	Miha Dovžan	Slovenia	25:10.4	1 (0+1)	+2:17.3
37	35	Grzegorz Galica	Poland	25:10.8	2 (0+2)	+2:17.7
38	49	Florent Claude	Belgium	25:13.9	2 (1+1)	+2:20.8
39	84	Fabian Müllauer	Austria	25:16.7	2 (0+2)	+2:23.6
40	65	Otto Invenius	Finland	25:20.1	4 (1+3)	+2:27.0
41	32	Fabien Claude	France	25:23.2	5 (2+3)	+2:30.1
42	10	Blagoy Todev	Bulgaria	25:23.6	1 (1+0)	+2:30.5
43	11	Malte Stefansson	Sweden	25:23.9	2 (2+0)	+2:30.8
44	73	Rene Zahkna	Estonia	25:26.9	1 (0+1)	+2:33.8
45	68	Mikuláš Karlík	Czech Republic	25:30.2	4 (1+3)	+2:37.1
46	18	Simon Eder	Austria	25:31.0	2 (1+1)	+2:37.9
47	31	Paul Schommer	United States	25:31.3	1 (1+0)	+2:38.2
48	61	Zachary Connelly	Canada	25:33.5	4 (0+4)	+2:40.4
49	24	Vytautas Strolia	Lithuania	25:37.4	2 (1+1)	+2:44.3
49	66	Patrick Jakob	Austria	25:37.4	2 (0+2)	+2:44.3
51	72	Vladislav Kireyev	Kazakhstan	25:41.6	2 (1+1)	+2:48.5
52	3	Edgars Mise	Latvia	25:42.9	1 (0+1)	+2:49.8
53	81	Kristo Siimer	Estonia	25:43.1	0 (0+0)	+2:50.0
54	76	Dmitrii Shamaev	Romania	25:43.3	1 (1+0)	+2:50.2
55	88	Logan Pletz	Canada	25:46.7	2 (1+1)	+2:53.6
56	57	Konstantin Vasilev	Bulgaria	25:52.3	4 (0+4)	+2:59.2
57	25	Konrad Badacz	Poland	25:53.3	3 (3+0)	+3:00.2
58	71	Jakub Borguľa	Slovakia	25:55.0	1 (0+1)	+3:01.9
59	19	Matija Legović	Croatia	25:58.6	2 (1+1)	+3:05.5
60	29	Sondre Slettemark	Denmark	25:59.5	2 (1+1)	+3:06.4
61	12	Asset Dyussenov	Kazakhstan	26:00.3	2 (2+0)	+3:07.2
62	6	Elia Zeni	Italy	26:00.4	3 (2+1)	+3:07.3
63	83	Bohdan Borkovskyi	Ukraine	26:06.0	2 (1+1)	+3:12.9
64	23	Yan Xingyuan	China	26:08.8	2 (0+2)	+3:15.7
65	80	Sean Doherty	United States	26:12.6	3 (1+2)	+3:19.5
66	59	Maxime Germain	United States	26:13.4	3 (3+0)	+3:20.3
67	13	George Colțea	Romania	26:14.9	2 (0+2)	+3:21.8
68	63	George Buta	Romania	26:15.2	1 (1+0)	+3:22.1
69	82	Marcin Zawół	Poland	26:15.4	4 (3+1)	+3:22.3
70	55	Vladimir Iliev	Bulgaria	26:17.8	4 (2+2)	+3:24.7
71	5	Maksim Fomin	Lithuania	26:19.5	2 (1+1)	+3:26.4
72	28	Jesper Nelin	Sweden	26:23.0	5 (2+3)	+3:29.9
73	7	Dominic Unterweger	Austria	26:29.7	3 (1+2)	+3:36.6
74	2	Jakob Kulbin	Estonia	26:30.7	2 (2+0)	+3:37.6
75	1	Šimon Adamov	Slovakia	26:32.0	2 (1+1)	+3:38.9
76	78	Jeremy Finello	Switzerland	26:41.1	4 (2+2)	+3:48.0
77	67	Renārs Birkentāls	Latvia	26:41.4	5 (3+2)	+3:48.3
78	45	Pavel Magazeev	Moldova	26:43.4	3 (1+2)	+3:50.3
79	69	Mark-Markos Kehva	Estonia	26:43.7	3 (2+1)	+3:50.6
80	86	Jasper Fleming	Canada	26:46.1	4 (3+1)	+3:53.0
81	14	Jacques Jefferies	Great Britain	27:02.5	3 (1+2)	+4:09.4
82	75	Anton Sinapov	Bulgaria	27:04.4	3 (0+3)	+4:11.3
83	89	Nikita Čigak	Lithuania	27:04.8	3 (2+1)	+4:11.7
84	70	Karol Dombrovski	Lithuania	27:07.0	3 (1+2)	+4:13.9
85	8	Thierry Langer	Belgium	27:11.3	3 (1+2)	+4:18.2
86	9	Maksim Makarov	Moldova	27:24.8	3 (3+0)	+4:31.7
87	87	Raul Flore	Romania	27:36.9	1 (0+1)	+4:43.8
88	39	Anton Dudchenko	Ukraine	27:37.6	3 (2+1)	+4:44.5
89	43	Krešimir Crnković	Croatia	28:04.5	5 (3+2)	+5:11.4
90	90	Choi Du-jin	South Korea	28:05.7	3 (3+0)	+5:12.6
