= Biathlon at the 2026 Winter Olympics – Men's pursuit =

Men's pursuit at the XXV Olympic Winter Games
- Biathlon
- Venue: Anterselva Biathlon Arena
- Date: 15 February 2026
- Competitors: 60 from 24 nations
- Winning time: 31:11.9

Medalists
1st place, gold medalist(s)		Martin Ponsiluoma	Sweden
2nd place, silver medalist(s)		Sturla Holm Lægreid	Norway
3rd place, bronze medalist(s)		Émilien Jacquelin	France

The men's pursuit competition of the 2026 Winter Olympics was held on 15 February, at the Anterselva Biathlon Arena in Rasen-Antholz. Martin Ponsiluoma of Sweden won the event, his first Olympic gold. Sturla Holm Lægreid of Norway won the silver medal, and Émilien Jacquelin of France won bronze, his first individual Olympic medal.

== Background ==
The pursuit is contingent on the results of the sprint held two days earlier. Quentin Fillon Maillet, the winner of the sprint, and also the defending champion in pursuit, started first, followed by the silver medalist Vetle Sjåstad Christiansen in 14 seconds and Sturla Holm Lægreid (3rd) and Émilien Jacquelin (4th) in 16 seconds. The 2022 silver medalist Tarjei Bø retired from competitions, and the bronze medalist Eduard Latypov was banned from participation because of the Russian invasion of Ukraine. Prior to the Olympics, Éric Perrot was leading the total as well as the pursuit standings of the 2025–26 Biathlon World Cup. The 2025 World champion was Johannes Thingnes Bø, he retired from competitions in the meanwhile.

== Results ==
The race was started at 11:15.

Rank	Bib	Name	Country	Start	Time	Penalties (P+P+S+S)	Deficit
1st place, gold medalist(s)	7	Martin Ponsiluoma	Sweden	0:47	31:11.9	1 (0+1+0+0)	
2nd place, silver medalist(s)	3	Sturla Holm Lægreid	Norway	0:16	31:32.5	2 (1+0+1+0)	+20.6
3rd place, bronze medalist(s)	4	Émilien Jacquelin	France	0:16	31:41.6	3 (1+0+0+2)	+29.7
4	9	Éric Perrot	France	1:02	31:51.4	1 (0+0+0+1)	+39.5
5	2	Vetle Sjåstad Christiansen	Norway	0:14	31:56.7	3 (1+0+1+1)	+44.8
6	6	Johannes Dale-Skjevdal	Norway	0:43	32:18.5	3 (1+0+1+1)	+1:06.6
7	1	Quentin Fillon Maillet	France	0:00	32:25.4	5 (1+2+0+2)	+1:13.5
8	12	Campbell Wright	United States	1:10	32:25.4	3 (2+0+1+0)	+1:13.5
9	22	Tommaso Giacomel	Italy	1:43	32:27.1	2 (1+1+0+0)	+1:15.2
10	8	Johan-Olav Botn	Norway	0:58	32:46.9	3 (0+2+1+0)	+1:35.0
11	10	Philipp Horn	Germany	1:09	33:22.7	3 (0+0+2+1)	+2:10.8
12	5	Sebastian Samuelsson	Sweden	0:25	33:34.6	5 (1+0+1+3)	+2:22.7
13	13	Lukas Hofer	Italy	1:22	33:39.8	3 (0+1+1+1)	+2:27.9
14	25	Jakov Fak	Slovenia	1:52	33:47.5	1 (0+1+0+0)	+2:35.6
15	18	Tero Seppälä	Finland	1:41	33:48.5	4 (1+0+2+1)	+2:36.6
16	24	Vitalii Mandzyn	Ukraine	1:47	33:56.0	3 (1+1+1+0)	+2:44.1
17	11	Olli Hiidensalo	Finland	1:09	34:00.3	4 (1+0+2+1)	+2:48.4
18	28	Michal Krčmář	Czech Republic	1:57	34:02.7	2 (1+0+0+1)	+2:50.8
19	20	Vítězslav Hornig	Czech Republic	1:42	34:07.7	3 (1+0+0+2)	+2:55.8
20	27	Dmytro Pidruchnyi	Ukraine	1:55	34:13.2	2 (1+0+0+1)	+3:01.3
21	21	Tuomas Harjula	Finland	1:43	34:16.5	3 (0+0+3+0)	+3:04.6
22	40	Otto Invenius	Finland	2:27	34:18.9	2 (1+0+1+0)	+3:07.0
23	35	Anton Vidmar	Slovenia	2:17	34:20.9	2 (1+1+0+0)	+3:09.0
24	41	Fabien Claude	France	2:30	34:22.4	4 (1+0+1+2)	+3:10.5
25	26	Philipp Nawrath	Germany	1:53	34:22.9	6 (2+1+1+2)	+3:11.0
26	15	Sebastian Stalder	Switzerland	1:34	34:23.2	2 (1+0+1+0)	+3:11.3
27	17	Niklas Hartweg	Switzerland	1:39	34:24.2	5 (1+0+2+2)	+3:12.3
28	16	Nicola Romanin	Italy	1:34	34:29.5	4 (1+1+1+1)	+3:17.6
29	30	Andrejs Rastorgujevs	Latvia	2:04	34:40.8	3 (0+0+1+2)	+3:28.9
30	23	Justus Strelow	Germany	1:46	34:47.4	4 (0+0+1+3)	+3:35.5
31	34	Lovro Planko	Slovenia	2:13	34:52.2	4 (0+0+2+2)	+3:40.3
32	29	Jan Guńka	Poland	1:57	34:59.5	3 (0+0+2+1)	+3:47.6
33	14	Joscha Burkhalter	Switzerland	1:22	35:01.4	4 (1+1+1+1)	+3:49.5
34	19	David Zobel	Germany	1:42	35:21.8	5 (2+1+1+1)	+4:09.9
35	45	Mikuláš Karlík	Czech Republic	2:37	35:30.5	5 (1+1+1+2)	+4:18.6
36	46	Simon Eder	Austria	2:38	35:34.0	3 (0+0+2+1)	+4:22.1
37	39	Fabian Müllauer	Austria	2:24	35:36.7	5 (1+0+1+3)	+4:24.8
38	54	Dmitrii Shamaev	Romania	2:50	35:37.4	1 (1+0+0+0)	+4:25.5
39	49	Vytautas Strolia	Lithuania	2:44	35:38.4	3 (1+1+0+1)	+4:26.5
40	37	Grzegorz Galica	Poland	2:18	35:40.8	5 (2+0+1+2)	+4:28.9
41	48	Zachary Connelly	Canada	2:40	35:51.3	5 (3+0+1+1)	+4:39.4
42	51	Vladislav Kireyev	Kazakhstan	2:49	35:52.0	4 (1+2+1+0)	+4:40.1
43	57	Konrad Badacz	Poland	3:00	35:52.6	1 (0+0+1+0)	+4:40.7
44	53	Kristo Siimer	Estonia	2:50	36:02.0	3 (0+1+2+0)	+4:50.1
45	33	Tomáš Mikyska	Czech Republic	2:12	36:25.6	4 (0+3+0+1)	+5:13.7
46	36	Miha Dovžan	Slovenia	2:17	36:29.0	6 (1+1+2+2)	+5:17.1
47	32	Rihards Lozbers	Latvia	2:12	36:29.2	7 (3+1+1+2)	+5:17.3
48	47	Paul Schommer	United States	2:38	36:41.4	4 (1+2+0+1)	+5:29.5
49	31	Adam Runnalls	Canada	2:09	36:48.3	7 (1+1+4+1)	+5:36.4
50	38	Florent Claude	Belgium	2:21	36:52.6	6 (2+1+2+1)	+5:40.7
51	44	Rene Zahkna	Estonia	2:34	36:54.1	6 (2+1+1+2)	+5:42.2
52	43	Malte Stefansson	Sweden	2:31	37:01.4	6 (3+0+1+2)	+5:49.5
53	55	Logan Pletz	Canada	2:54	37:28.0	5 (1+1+2+1)	+6:16.1
54	60	Sondre Slettemark	Denmark	3:06	37:41.2	4 (1+0+3+0)	+6:29.3
55	50	Patrick Jakob	Austria	2:44	37:54.6	5 (0+3+2+0)	+6:42.7
56	58	Jakub Borguľa	Slovakia	3:02	38:16.0	4 (1+1+1+1)	+7:04.1
57	56	Konstantin Vasilev	Bulgaria	2:59	40:00.7	7 (1+3+1+2)	+8:48.8
	42	Blagoy Todev	Bulgaria	2:31	LAP	(3+2+0+)	—
	52	Edgars Mise	Latvia	2:50	LAP	(4+1+2+)	—
	59	Matija Legović	Croatia	3:06	LAP	(2+2+3+)	—
