= Biathlon at the 2026 Winter Olympics – Women's pursuit =

Women's pursuit at the XXV Olympic Winter Games
- Biathlon
- Venue: Anterselva Biathlon Arena
- Date: 15 February 2026
- Competitors: 59 from 24 nations
- Winning time: 30:11.8

Medalists
1st place, gold medalist(s)		Lisa Vittozzi	Italy
2nd place, silver medalist(s)		Maren Kirkeeide	Norway
3rd place, bronze medalist(s)		Suvi Minkkinen	Finland

The women's pursuit competition of the 2026 Winter Olympics was held on 15 February, at the Anterselva Biathlon Arena in Rasen-Antholz. Lisa Vittozzi of Italy won the event, Maren Kirkeeide of Norway, the winner of sprint who started first, won the silver medal, and Suvi Minkkinen of Finland won bronze. Vittozzi's medal was the first gold medal of Italy in biathlon, and Minkkinen won her first Olympic medal.

== Background ==
The pursuit is contingent on the results of the sprint held on the previous day. Maren Kirkeeide, the winner of the sprint, will start first, followed by the silver medalist Océane Michelon in 4 seconds and the bronze medalist Lou Jeanmonnot in 24 seconds. The 2022 champion, Marte Olsbu Røiseland, and the bronze medalist, Tiril Eckhoff, retired from competitions. The 2022 silver medalist, Elvira Öberg, finished the 27th in sprint and will start 1:38 behind Kirkeeide. Prior to the Olympics, Jeanmonnot was leading the total standings of the 2025–26 Biathlon World Cup, and Suvi Minkkinen was leading the pursuit standings. Minkkinen will start 50 seconds behind Kirkeeide. The 2025 World champion was Franziska Preuß, who will start one minute behind Kirkeeide.

== Results ==
The race was started at 14:45.

Rank	Bib	Name	Country	Start	Time	Penalties (P+P+S+S)	Deficit
1st place, gold medalist(s)	5	Lisa Vittozzi	Italy	0:41	30:11.8	0 (0+0+0+0)	
2nd place, silver medalist(s)	1	Maren Kirkeeide	Norway	0:00	30:40.6	3 (0+1+0+2)	+28.8
3rd place, bronze medalist(s)	6	Suvi Minkkinen	Finland	0:50	30:46.1	0 (0+0+0+0)	+34.3
4	3	Lou Jeanmonnot	France	0:24	31:01.2	3 (0+1+1+1)	+49.4
5	2	Océane Michelon	France	0:04	31:08.9	4 (2+0+1+1)	+57.1
6	7	Franziska Preuß	Germany	1:00	31:19.8	2 (0+0+0+2)	+1:08.0
7	11	Lora Hristova	Bulgaria	1:13	31:24.0	0 (0+0+0+0)	+1:12.2
8	18	Hanna Öberg	Sweden	1:27	31:31.5	2 (1+0+0+1)	+1:19.7
9	44	Dorothea Wierer	Italy	2:13	31:42.1	1 (0+1+0+0)	+1:30.3
10	22	Linn Gestblom	Sweden	1:33	31:47.2	2 (0+0+2+0)	+1:35.4
11	16	Estere Volfa	Latvia	1:27	31:49.9	1 (0+0+1+0)	+1:38.1
12	8	Kamila Żuk	Poland	1:09	31:53.6	3 (1+1+1+0)	+1:41.8
13	41	Natalia Sidorowicz	Poland	2:10	31:56.8	0 (0+0+0+0)	+1:45.0
14	4	Milena Todorova	Bulgaria	0:40	31:57.0	3 (0+0+1+2)	+1:45.2
15	14	Karoline Offigstad Knotten	Norway	1:19	32:16.2	2 (0+1+0+1)	+2:04.4
16	28	Joanna Jakieła	Poland	1:40	32:28.5	3 (2+0+0+1)	+2:16.7
17	35	Anna Magnusson	Sweden	1:57	32:29.4	3 (2+0+1+0)	+2:17.6
18	19	Tereza Voborníková	Czech Republic	1:29	32:30.5	2 (0+0+0+2)	+2:18.7
19	12	Vanessa Voigt	Germany	1:14	32:31.5	3 (1+1+0+1)	+2:19.7
20	17	Anne de Besche	Denmark	1:27	32:31.9	2 (0+2+0+0)	+2:20.1
21	9	Anna Andexer	Austria	1:09	32:36.6	3 (1+1+0+1)	+2:24.8
22	37	Susan Külm	Estonia	2:03	32:49.7	2 (1+0+1+0)	+2:37.9
23	27	Elvira Öberg	Sweden	1:38	32:49.9	5 (1+2+0+2)	+2:38.1
24	13	Lea Meier	Switzerland	1:17	32:53.4	5 (1+2+0+2)	+2:41.6
25	40	Paulína Bátovská Fialková	Slovakia	2:10	32:54.1	3 (0+1+1+1)	+2:42.3
26	43	Hannah Auchentaller	Italy	2:12	32:56.2	2 (0+0+1+1)	+2:44.4
27	29	Amy Baserga	Switzerland	1:46	33:08.5	3 (0+0+1+2)	+2:56.7
28	25	Polona Klemenčič	Slovenia	1:37	33:08.7	5 (1+1+1+2)	+2:56.9
29	30	Lisa Theresa Hauser	Austria	1:50	33:08.9	4 (0+0+1+3)	+2:57.1
30	32	Anna Gandler	Austria	1:54	33:10.5	3 (1+0+1+1)	+2:58.7
31	31	Chu Yuanmeng	China	1:52	33:21.4	1 (0+1+0+0)	+3:09.6
32	21	Lena Repinc	Slovenia	1:33	33:23.6	4 (2+1+0+1)	+3:11.8
33	33	Marthe Kråkstad Johansen	Norway	1:55	33:26.6	3 (1+0+1+1)	+3:14.8
34	20	Julia Tannheimer	Germany	1:32	33:35.4	5 (0+2+2+1)	+3:23.6
35	47	Deedra Irwin	United States	2:19	33:51.5	4 (1+1+2+0)	+3:39.7
36	23	Michela Carrara	Italy	1:34	33:57.1	7 (1+2+3+1)	+3:45.3
37	26	Maya Cloetens	Belgium	1:37	34:00.6	5 (2+0+3+0)	+3:48.8
38	51	Mária Remeňová	Slovakia	2:21	34:01.5	2 (0+1+0+1)	+3:49.7
39	48	Meng Fanqi	China	2:19	34:01.6	1 (0+0+0+1)	+3:49.8
40	45	Anna Mąka	Poland	2:14	34:03.3	3 (0+0+2+1)	+3:51.5
41	52	Selina Grotian	Germany	2:23	34:06.4	4 (0+1+1+2)	+3:54.6
42	15	Baiba Bendika	Latvia	1:23	34:17.2	7 (2+2+1+2)	+4:05.4
43	24	Yuliia Dzhima	Ukraine	1:35	34:21.4	3 (0+1+1+1)	+4:09.6
44	55	Aita Gasparin	Switzerland	2:24	34:25.3	3 (0+2+0+1)	+4:13.5
45	54	Khrystyna Dmytrenko	Ukraine	2:24	34:33.9	3 (1+0+0+2)	+4:22.1
46	10	Ingrid Landmark Tandrevold	Norway	1:12	34:34.9	9 (3+0+3+3)	+4:23.1
47	39	Lotte Lie	Belgium	2:08	34:35.0	3 (2+0+0+1)	+4:23.2
48	42	Oleksandra Merkushyna	Ukraine	2:11	34:45.4	5 (0+2+2+1)	+4:33.6
49	36	Anastasiya Kuzmina	Slovakia	2:00	34:45.6	5 (1+1+2+1)	+4:33.8
50	46	Lucie Charvátová	Czech Republic	2:15	34:51.1	7 (1+2+2+2)	+4:39.3
51	50	Tereza Vinklárková	Czech Republic	2:20	34:53.6	5 (1+2+2+0)	+4:41.8
52	53	Ema Kapustová	Slovakia	2:23	35:07.3	4 (1+1+2+0)	+4:55.5
53	38	Sanita Buliņa	Latvia	2:07	35:08.1	4 (0+1+0+3)	+4:56.3
54	60	Lena Häcki-Groß	Switzerland	2:40	35:18.5	6 (1+1+2+2)	+5:06.7
55	58	Ekaterina Avvakumova	South Korea	2:38	35:33.0	2 (1+0+1+0)	+5:21.2
56	59	Anastasia Tolmacheva	Romania	2:38	36:13.4	3 (2+0+1+0)	+6:01.6
57	49	Judita Traubaitė	Lithuania	2:19	36:31.3	5 (1+2+1+1)	+6:19.5
58	56	Benita Peiffer	Canada	2:28	36:43.0	6 (1+2+2+1)	+6:31.2
	57	Tuuli Tomingas	Estonia	2:33	Did not finish		
	34	Julia Simon	France	1:56	Did not start		
