= Bulgaria at the 2026 Winter Olympics =

- IOC code: BUL
- NOC: Bulgarian Olympic Committee
- Website: www.bgolympic.org (in Bulgarian and English)

in Milan and Cortina d'Ampezzo, Italy 6 February 2026 – 22 February 2026
- Competitors: 20 (12 men and 8 women) in 6 sports
- Flag bearers (opening): Vladimir Iliev & Alexandra Feigin
- Flag bearer (closing): Lora Hristova
- Medals Ranked 28th: Gold 0 Silver 0 Bronze 2 Total 2

Winter Olympics appearances (overview)
- 1936; 1948; 1952; 1956; 1960; 1964; 1968; 1972; 1976; 1980; 1984; 1988; 1992; 1994; 1998; 2002; 2006; 2010; 2014; 2018; 2022; 2026

Bulgaria competed at the 2026 Winter Olympics in Milan and Cortina d'Ampezzo, Italy, from 6 to 22 February 2026.

Biathlete Vladimir Iliev and figure skater Alexandra Feigin were the country's flagbearer during the opening ceremony. Meanwhile, biathlete Lora Hristova was the country's flagbearer during the closing ceremony.

On February 8, Tervel Zamfirov won a bronze medal in the snowboard giant slalom, thus winning Bulgaria's seventh medal at the Winter Olympics and the first medal after a 20-year hiatus. They last won a medal in Italy in the 2006 Winter Olympics.

== Medalists ==
Medal	Name	Sport	Event	Date
Bronze	Tervel Zamfirov	Snowboarding	Men's parallel giant slalom	8 February
Bronze	Lora Hristova	Biathlon	Women's individual	11 February

== Competitors ==
The following is the list of number of competitors participating at the Games per sport/discipline.

Sport	Men	Women	Total
Alpine skiing	2	1	3
Biathlon	4	4	8
Cross-country skiing	2	1	3
Figure skating	0	1	1
Ski jumping	1	0	1
Snowboarding	3	1	4
Total	12	8	20

== Alpine skiing ==
Bulgaria qualified one female and two male alpine skiers. On January 20th skiers Albert Popov, Kalin Zlatkov and Anina Zurbriggen were named to the Olympic team.

Athlete	Event	Run 1		Run 2		Total	
Athlete	Event	Time	Rank	Time	Rank	Time	Rank
Albert Popov	Men's slalom	DNF					
Kalin Zlatkov	Men's giant slalom	1:22.32	40	1:16.76	38	2:39.08	36
Kalin Zlatkov	Men's slalom	DNF					
Anina Zurbriggen	Women's giant slalom	DNF					
Anina Zurbriggen	Women's slalom	52.73	47	57.07	41	1:49.80	41

== Biathlon ==
Bulgaria qualified four female and four male biathletes through the 2024–25 Biathlon World Cup score. On January 20th the Olympic team was named.

Men

Athlete	Event	Time	Misses	Rank
Vladimir Iliev	Sprint	26:17.8	4 (2+2)	70
Vladimir Iliev	Individual	1:01:22.8	9 (3+2+3+1)	75
Blagoy Todev	Sprint	25:23.6	1 (1+0)	42
Blagoy Todev	Individual	55:10.9	2 (1+0+0+1)	22
Blagoy Todev	Pursuit	LAP	(3+2+0+)	DNF
Anton Sinapov	Sprint	27:04.4	3 (0+3)	80
Anton Sinapov	Individual	1:00:50.1	4 (1+1+0+2)	69
Konstantin Vasilev	Sprint	25:52.3	4 (0+4)	56
Konstantin Vasilev	Individual	1:01:55.1	9 (3+2+3+1)	78
Konstantin Vasilev	Pursuit	40:00.7	7 (1+3+1+2)	57
Vladimir Iliev; Blagoy Todev; Anton Sinapov; Konstantin Vasilev	Team relay	1:23:42.5	10 (4+6)	12

Women

Athlete	Event	Time	Misses	Rank
Milena Todorova	Sprint	21:20.8	1 (1+0)	4
Milena Todorova	Individual	47:02.9	5 (1+2+1+1)	59
Milena Todorova	Pursuit	31:57.0	3 (0+0+1+2)	14
Milena Todorova	Mass start	39:14.4	5 (0+1+1+3)	20
Lora Hristova	Sprint	21:54.1	1 (1+0)	11
Lora Hristova	Individual	42:20.1	0 (0+0+0+0)	3rd place, bronze medalist(s)
Lora Hristova	Pursuit	31:24.0	0 (0+0+0+0)	7
Lora Hristova	Mass start	38:40.0	2 (0+0+0+2)	14
Valentina Dimitrova	Sprint	24:56.1	3 (2+1)	85
Valentina Dimitrova	Individual	48:35.8	2 (0+1+1+0)	73
Maria Zdravkova	Sprint	24:44.2	4 (1+3)	83
Maria Zdravkova	Individual	49:21.7	6 (1+1+1+3)	77
Milena Todorova; Lora Hristova; Valentina Dimitrova; Maria Zdravkova	Team relay	1:14:49.9	12 (4+8)	12

Mixed

Athlete	Event	Time	Misses	Rank
Milena Todorova; Lora Hristova; Vladimir Iliev; Blagoy Todev	Relay	1:07:46.0	15 (8+7)	16

== Cross-country skiing ==
Bulgaria qualified one female and one male cross-country skier through the basic quota. Following the completion of the 2024–25 FIS Cross-Country World Cup, Bulgaria qualified a further one male athlete. On January 20th the following athletes were named to the Olympic team:

Distance

Athlete	Event	Final		
Athlete	Event	Time	Deficit	Rank
Mario Matikanov	Men's 20 km skiathlon	54:04.4	+7:53.4	62
Mario Matikanov	Men's 10 km freestyle	23:00.5	+2:24.3	49
Daniel Peshkov	Men's 20 km skiathlon	DNF		
Daniel Peshkov	Men's 10 km freestyle	23:54.8	+3:18.6	67
Daniel Peshkov	Men's 50 km classical	2:33:00.0	+26:15.2	42
Kalina Nedyalkova	Women's 10 km freestyle	29:02.5	+6:13.3	87

Sprint

Athlete	Event	Qualification		Quarterfinal		Semifinal		Final	
Athlete	Event	Time	Rank	Time	Rank	Time	Rank	Time	Rank
Mario Matikanov	Men's sprint	3:37.97	74	Did not advance					
Daniel Peshkov	Men's sprint	3:37.69	73	Did not advance					
Mario Matikanov; Daniel Peshkov	Men's team sprint	6:18.21	22	—N/a				Did not advance	
Kalina Nedyalkova	Women's sprint	4:21.14	73	Did not advance					

== Figure skating ==
In the 2025 World Figure Skating Championships in Boston, the United States, Bulgaria secured one quota in each of the women's singles.

Athlete	Event	SP/SD		FP/FD		Total	
Athlete	Event	Points	Rank	Points	Rank	Points	Rank
Alexandra Feigin	Women's singles	53.42	28	Did not advance			

== Ski jumping ==
Bulgaria qualified one male athlete. On January 20th Vladimir Zografski was announced as the sole ski jumper in the Olympic team.

Athlete	Event	First round			Final round			Total	
Athlete	Event	Distance	Points	Rank	Distance	Points	Rank	Points	Rank
Vladimir Zografski	Men's normal hill	98.0	121.5	32	Did not advance			121.5	32
Vladimir Zografski	Men's large hill	133.5	139.3	6 Q	133.5	138.0	10	277.3	10

== Snowboarding ==
Bulgaria qualified 1 female and 3 male snowboarders. On January 20th the athletes taking part at the Olympics were named.

Men's Parallel

Athlete	Event	Qualification		Round of 16	Quarterfinal	Semifinal	Final	
Athlete	Event	Time	Rank	Opposition Time	Opposition Time	Opposition Time	Opposition Time	Rank
Radoslav Yankov	Men's giant slalom	1:27.44	13 Q	Gaudet (CAN); L +0.11	Did not advance			13
Tervel Zamfirov	Men's giant slalom	1:26.58	5 Q	Huber (GER); W	Gaudet (CAN); W	Kim (KOR); L +0.23	Mastnak (SLO); W	3rd place, bronze medalist(s)
Alexander Krashniak	Men's giant slalom	1:32.27	31	Did not advance				31

Women's Parallel

Athlete	Event	Qualification		Round of 16	Quarterfinal	Semifinal	Final	
Athlete	Event	Time	Rank	Opposition Time	Opposition Time	Opposition Time	Opposition Time	Rank
Malena Zamfirova	Women's giant slalom	1:34.29	10 Q	Hofmeister (GER); L +0.02	Did not advance			9

== See also ==
- Bulgaria at the 2026 Winter Paralympics
