= Martin Fehérváry =

Slovak ice hockey player (born 1999)

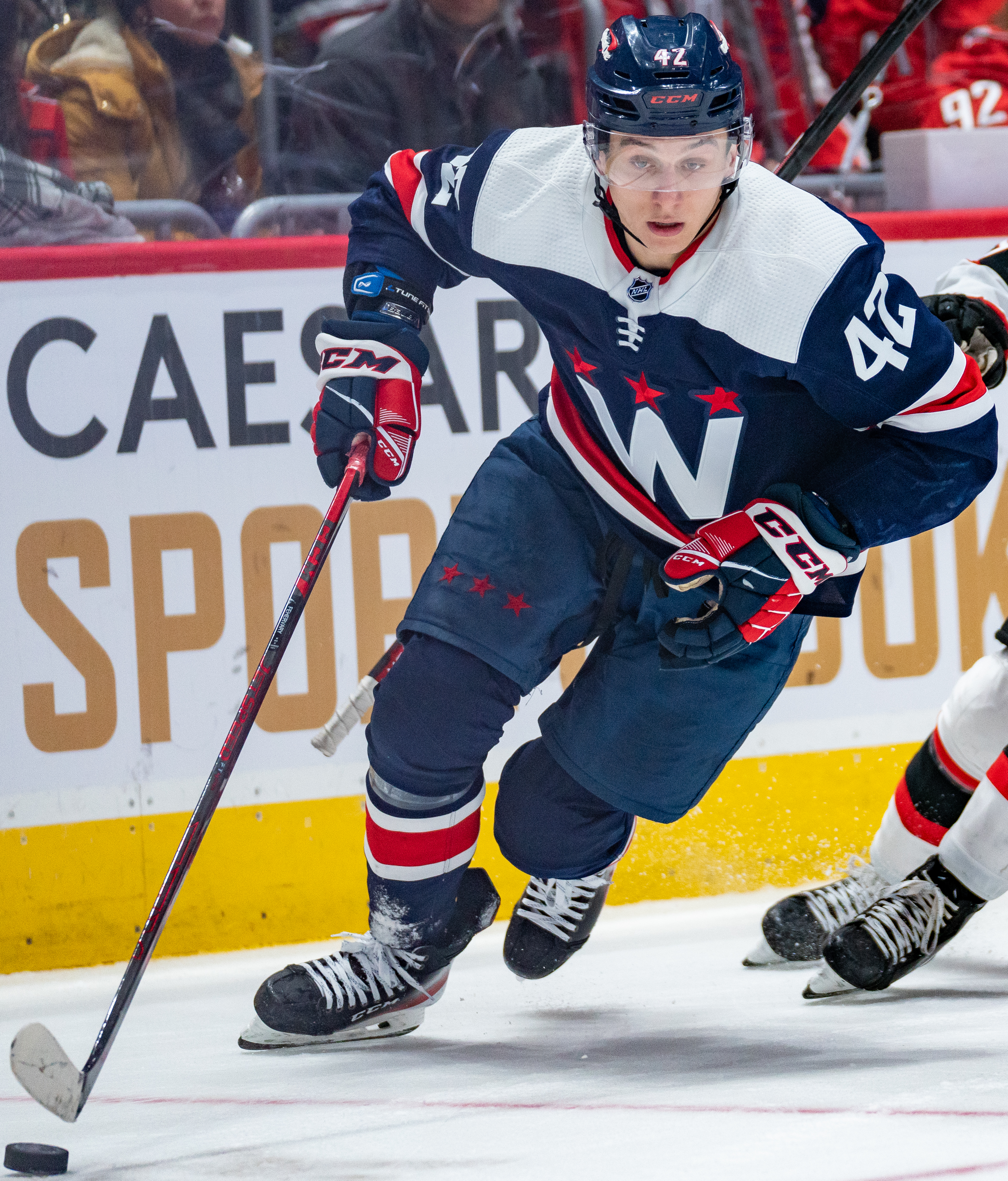
- Fehérváry with the Washington Capitals in 2022
- Born: 6 October 1999 (age 27) Bratislava, Slovakia
- Height: 6 ft 2 in (188 cm)
- Weight: 215 lb (98 kg; 15 st 5 lb)
- Position: Defence
- Shoots: Left
- NHL team Former teams: Washington Capitals; Malmö Redhawks; HV71
- National team: Slovakia
- NHL draft: 46th overall, 2018; Washington Capitals
- Playing career: 2016–present

Martin Fehérváry (born 6 October 1999) is a Slovak professional ice hockey player who is a defenceman for the Washington Capitals of the National Hockey League (NHL).

Growing up in Bratislava, Slovakia, Fehérváry began playing for the SHKM Hodonín club, Svišť Bratislava U18 team, and attended Svišt Hockey School, which was founded by his family. He left his home country at the age of 15 to play with the Malmö Redhawks organization in Sweden. Fehérváry climbed through their ranks from under-16, under-18, and under-20 before making his Swedish Hockey League debut at the age of 16. Following his trade to HV71, Fehérváry was selected 46th overall by the Washington Capitals in the 2018 NHL entry draft.

Upon moving to North America, Fehérváry began playing with Washington's American Hockey League (AHL) affiliate, the Hershey Bears. Fehérváry spent the majority of his rookie season with the Bears and finished the season with four goals and 10 assists for 14 points through 56 games. He also spent his sophomore season with the Bears before earning a place in the Capitals lineup in 2021 following the departures of Zdeno Chára and Brenden Dillon.

== Early life ==
Fehérváry was born on 6 October 1999 in Bratislava, Slovakia to parents Gabika and Mario. His mother died of lung cancer in 2009 when he was nine, so Fehérváry and his two siblings were raised by his father. Growing up, Fehérváry's brother and father enjoyed sports so he began playing ice hockey at the age of four. Fehérváry began playing for the SHKM Hodonín club which included a mix of Czechs and Slovaks. He then attended the Svišt Hockey School, which his parents founded, and played forward until the age of 11 when his coach transitioned him to defence.

== Playing career ==
After playing for the SHKM Hodonín club in the Czech Republic, Fehérváry returned to Slovakia to play for the Svišť Bratislava U18 team. On that team, he played with future professional players Adam Ružička and Filip Krivošík. Fehérváry then accepted an offer from Sweden and went abroad at the age of 15. He joined the Malmö Redhawks for their 2014–15 season and quickly climbed their ranks from U16, U18, and U20 before making his Swedish Hockey League debut at the age of 16.

Upon making his debut, Fehérváry became the franchise's youngest player to ever skate with the team in the SHL and the youngest foreign player ever in the league. Fehérváry played four games in the SHL in 2015–16 and nine more in 2016–17 before joining the IK Oskarshamn in the HockeyAllsvenskan to garner more playing time. After playing in 21 games for the club, and accumulating four points, Fehérváry was appointed captain of IK Oskarshamn. He subsequently became the youngest captain at the Swedish professional level. During this time, he was also drafted by the HC Slovan Bratislava in the 2016 KHL Junior Draft but he chose to remain in the SHL.

During the 2017–18 season, Fehérváry tallied seven points through 42 games with the IK Oskarshamn. He was also loaned to the HV71 for one game and they expressed interest in signing him for the following season. As a result of his focus on hockey, Fehérváry missed a year of school while studying at the School of Business and Services in Trnava. At the conclusion of the season, Fehérváry was selected 46th overall by the Washington Capitals in the 2018 NHL entry draft. After his selection by the Capitals, Fehérváry was promptly signed to a three-year, entry-level contract with Washington on 1 July 2018. He attended the Capitals' 2018 rookie and main training camps, before he was re-assigned to return on loan to SHL club, HV71, for the duration of the 2018–19 season. While loaned to the HV71, Fehérváry scored his first SHL goal against his former team on 24 November 2018. He continued to be one of the best defencemen on the team as he helped them advance to the SHL quarterfinals against the Färjestad BK.

=== Washington Capitals ===
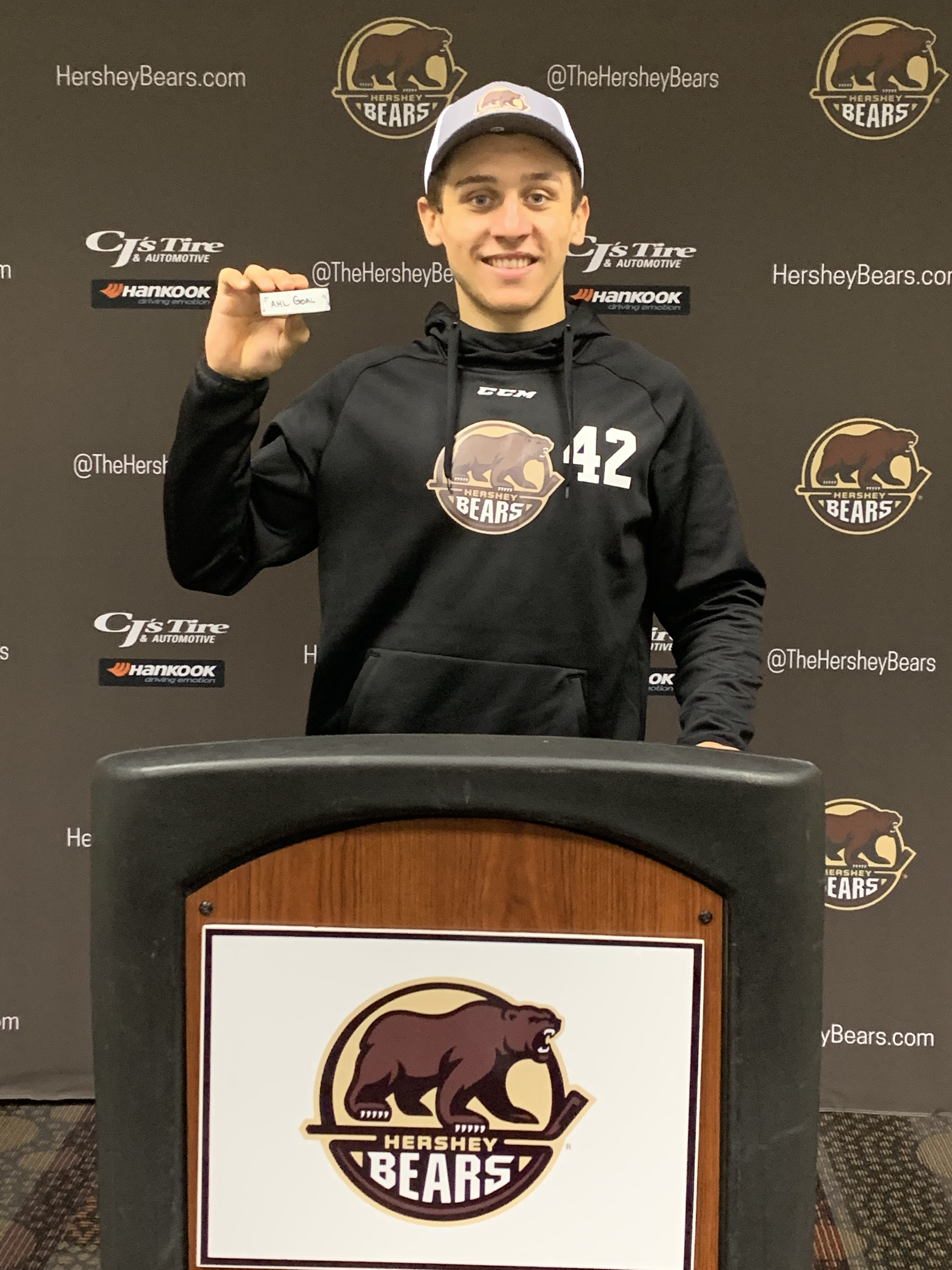
Fehérváry after scoring his first AHL goal on 13 October 2019.

Following the conclusion of the 2018–19 SHL season, Fehérváry moved to North America and joined the Capitals organization for their prospect showcase. After attending their training camp, he made his NHL debut on 2 October 2019 against the St. Louis Blues. By making his NHL debut prior to his 20th birthday, Fehérváry became the 10th Washington defenceman to play as a teenager, and the first since Connor Carrick in 2013–14. During his three games with the Capitals, Fehérváry averaged 14:29 time on ice per game and recorded a 54.72 shot attempt percentage at five-on-five. He was re-assigned to the Capitals American Hockey League (AHL) affiliate, the Hershey Bears on 6 October 2019 after playing in three games. Upon joining the Bears, Fehérváry played on their first defensive pair and quickly led all team rookies in points.

Fehérváry spent the majority of his rookie season with the Bears and finished the season with four goals and 10 assists for 14 points through 56 games. He also recorded a plus-minus of +15 for third on the team. Throughout the shortened season, Fehérváry played on the Bears' first defensive pair with Christian Djoos, where he played against the other teams' best defencemen. Following another recall in February, Fehérváry replaced Nick Jensen on defence for the Capitals and tallied up his first NHL point, an assist, in a 7–2 loss to the Philadelphia Flyers. Once the NHL was paused due to the COVID-19 pandemic, Fehérváry returned to his home country and continued to work towards his degree in sales and marketing.

Once the NHL resumed play for the 2020 Stanley Cup playoffs, Fehérváry was invited to participate in the Capital's training camp ahead of the postseason. He subsequently made his playoff debut in Game 1 of the round robin qualifiers against the Boston Bruins. During his debut, he skated 15:14 in ice time and recorded a team high seven hits. After beating the Bruins, the Capitals faced the New York Islanders during the Eastern Conference first round. Fehérváry was limited to just two playoff games as he was injured in Game 3 and deemed unfit for the remainder of the first round. The Capitals were eventually eliminated by the Islanders in Game 5 with a 4–0 loss.

Following the conclusion of the 2019–20 season, the Capitals signed three right-handed defencemen in the off-season; Justin Schultz, Trevor van Riemsdyk, and Paul LaDue. With veteran defencemen Brenden Dillon, Dmitry Orlov, and Jonas Siegenthaler also returning, Fehérváry was slated to return to the AHL for the 2020–21 season. Fehérváry started the season on the Capitals taxi squad but was sent to Hershey in time to play in their season opener on 6 February. While with the Bears, he suffered an upper-body injury on 17 February in a game against the Binghamton Devils and missed the next three games to recover. Upon returning to the lineup, Fehérváry recorded seven points in the month, the most among Hershey defencemen. He finished the season with three goals and 14 assists for a career-high 17 points through 24 games, and received the teams' Milton Garland Memorial Award for Bears Best Defender.

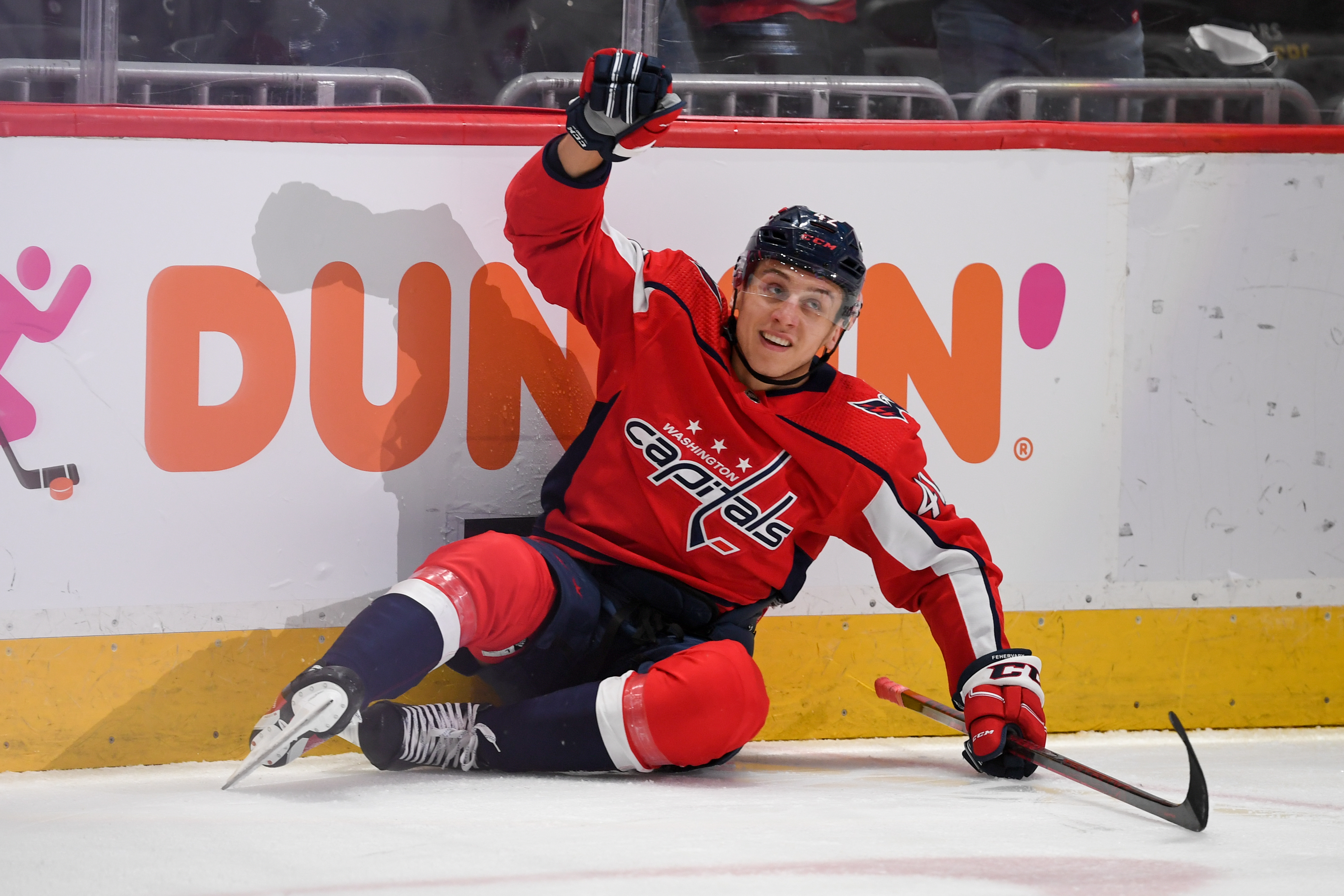
Fehérváry after scoring a goal during a game at Capital One Arena in 2022.

After spending the pandemic-shortened 2020–21 season with the Bears, Fehérváry returned to the Capitals lineup in 2021–22 following the departure of Zdeno Chára and Brenden Dillon. He joined the Capitals for their preseason but suffered an injury in the 4–1 loss to the New Jersey Devils. However, Fehérváry recovered from the injury without missing a game and returned to the Capitals lineup for their final preseason matchup against the Flyers. In the final game, Fehérváry logged 19:57 of ice time and recorded five shots on net, two hits, and one blocked shot. Following the re-assignment of Michal Kempný on 10 October, Fehérváry joined John Carlson on the first defensive pair where he was praised for his confidence in his shut-down roles. In this role, he scored his first career NHL goal in a 4–3 loss to the Calgary Flames on 23 October 2021. By December 2021, Fehérváry had tallied three goals and three assists through 28 games before missing his first game of the season due to a hit from Pittsburgh Penguins forward Brock McGinn. Upon returning to the lineup, he scored the tying goal against the Buffalo Sabres in an eventual 3–2 shootout win. Throughout the second half of the season, Fehérváry continued to improve defensively and ranked second among rookies in hits while also playing an average ice time of 19:42. His play was recognized by hockey pundits as he was named to the NHL All-Rookie All-Star Team in January 2022. Later in April, Fehérváry became the sixth Capitals rookie defenceman to score eight or more goals in a season and the first since Ken Klee in 1995–96. He subsequently finished his rookie season with eight goals and nine assists for 17 points through 79 games.

As a restricted free agent following the 2022–23 season, Fehérváry was re-signed by the Capitals to a three-year, $8.025 million contract extension on 4 July 2023.

On 1 July 2025, Fehervary signed a seven-year, $42 million contract extension with the Capitals, carrying an average annual value of $6 million through the 2032–33 season.

== International play ==
As a native of Slovakia, Fehérváry has represented his home country at both the junior and senior international levels. He joined the Slovakia under-17 team for the first time in 2015 while competing at the 2015 European Youth Olympic Festival. He then made his international debut during the 2016 World U18 Championships where he tallied three assists in five games. The following year, Fehérváry joined Slovakia junior team for the 2017 World Junior Championships but they were eliminated in the quarterfinals by Sweden. Following the elimination, Fehérváry was named as one of the teams's best three players at the tournament. In the same year, he also represented his home country at the 2017 World U18 Championships as co-captain alongside Marek Korenčík. During the 2017 World U18 Championships, Fehérváry played top-four minutes and tallied two points through seven games. He was then invited to represent Slovakia senior team at the 2018 World Championship where he tallied two assists.

After making his senior debut in 2018, Fehérváry returned to the world juniors stage for the 2019 World Junior Championships as team captain. As a result of his defensive skills, Fehérváry was given increased responsibility on the ice which included defending against the other top defencemen in the tournament. He finished the tournament with one goal and four assists through five games played. Following this, he was again named to Slovakia's senior team for the 2019 World Championship.

Although Fehérváry was invited to represent Slovakia in the qualifying games for the 2022 Winter Olympics, an injury prohibited him from representing his home country at the tournament. He soon regained the chance to represent Slovakia at the international level during the 2022 World Championship following Washington's elimination from the Stanley Cup playoffs.

== Career statistics ==
Career statistics derived from Elite Prospects.

=== Regular season and playoffs ===
			Regular season					Playoffs
Season	Team	League	GP	G	A	Pts	PIM	GP	G	A	Pts	PIM
2015–16	Malmö Redhawks	J20	27	0	4	4	16	3	0	0	0	0
2015–16	Malmö Redhawks	SHL	4	0	0	0	0	—	—	—	—	—
2016–17	Malmö Redhawks	J20	32	4	5	9	41	2	0	0	0	0
2016–17	Malmö Redhawks	SHL	9	0	0	0	0	—	—	—	—	—
2017–18	IK Oskarshamn	Allsv	42	1	6	7	24	8	1	2	3	2
2017–18	HV71	SHL	1	0	0	0	0	—	—	—	—	—
2018–19	HV71	SHL	45	1	6	7	10	9	0	3	3	2
2019–20	Washington Capitals	NHL	6	0	1	1	6	2	0	0	0	0
2019–20	Hershey Bears	AHL	56	4	10	14	32	—	—	—	—	—
2020–21	Hershey Bears	AHL	24	3	14	17	29	—	—	—	—	—
2021–22	Washington Capitals	NHL	79	8	9	17	26	6	0	0	0	8
2022–23	Washington Capitals	NHL	67	6	10	16	31	—	—	—	—	—
2023–24	Washington Capitals	NHL	66	3	13	16	24	4	2	1	3	2
2024–25	Washington Capitals	NHL	81	5	20	25	25	—	—	—	—	—
2025–26	Washington Capitals	NHL	81	5	22	27	39	—	—	—	—	—
SHL totals			59	1	6	7	10	9	0	3	3	2
NHL totals			380	27	75	102	151	12	2	1	3	10

=== International ===
Year	Team	Event	Result	GP	G	A	Pts	PIM
2016	Slovakia	WJC18	5th	5	0	3	3	2
2017	Slovakia	WJC18	6th	5	1	1	2	4
2017	Slovakia	WJC	8th	5	1	0	1	4
2018	Slovakia	WJC	7th	5	1	1	2	4
2018	Slovakia	WC	9th	7	0	2	2	2
2019	Slovakia	WJC	8th	5	1	4	5	2
2019	Slovakia	WC	9th	7	0	1	1	0
2022	Slovakia	WC	8th	5	1	0	1	2
2024	Slovakia	WC	7th	8	1	1	2	4
2026	Slovakia	OG	4th	6	0	4	4	6
Junior totals				25	4	9	13	16
Senior totals				33	2	8	10	14
