= Pavol Regenda =

Slovak ice hockey player (born 1999)

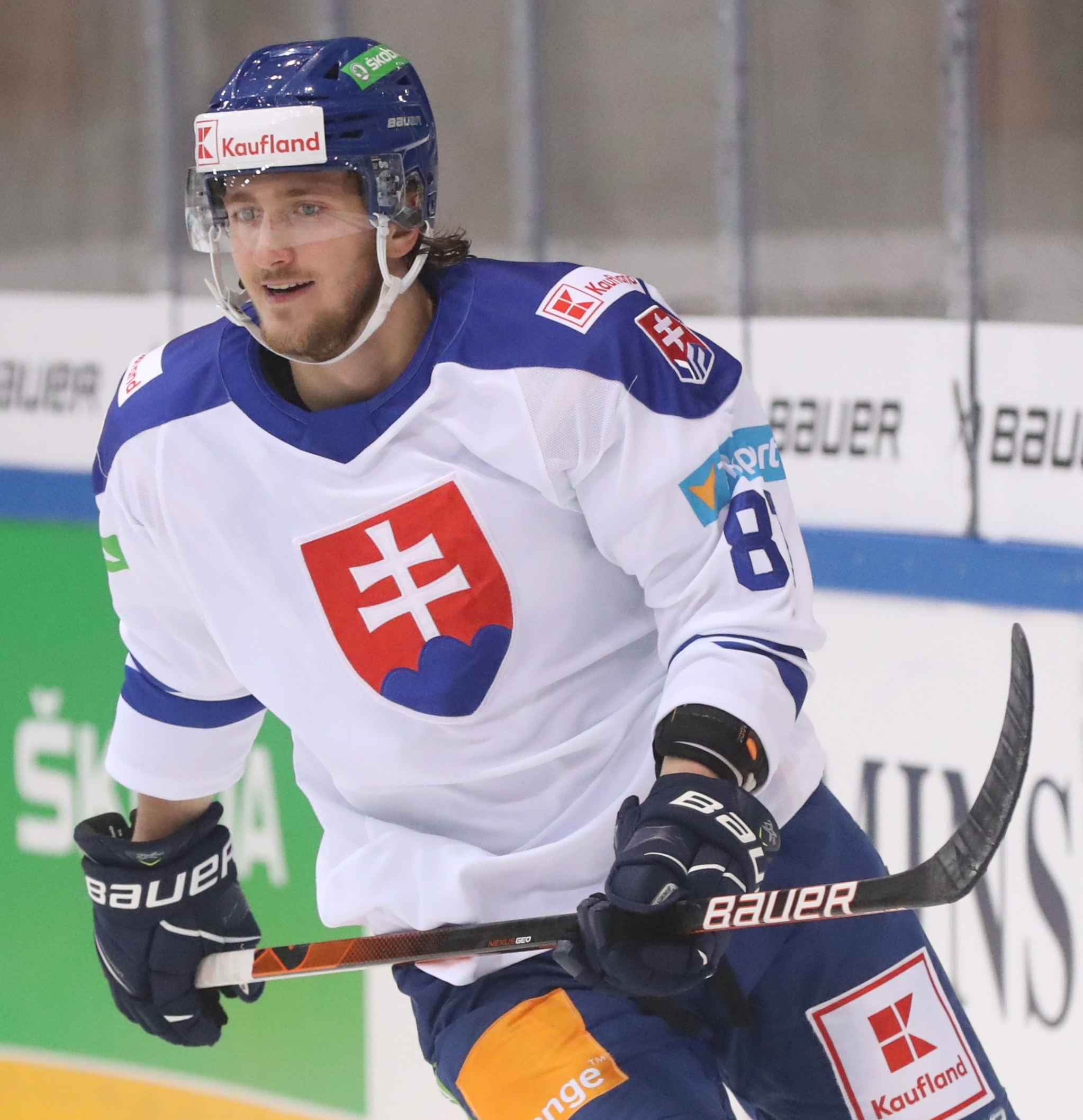
- Regenda in 2022
- Born: 7 December 1999 (age 26) Michalovce, Slovakia
- Height: 6 ft 4 in (193 cm)
- Weight: 212 lb (96 kg; 15 st 2 lb)
- Position: Winger
- Shoots: Left
- SHL team Former teams: HV71; HK Dukla Michalovce; Anaheim Ducks; San Jose Sharks
- National team: Slovakia
- NHL draft: Undrafted
- Playing career: 2019–present

Pavol Regenda (born 7 December 1999) is a Slovak professional ice hockey winger for HV71 of the Swedish Hockey League (SHL). He most recently played for the San Jose Sharks of the National Hockey League (NHL). Regenda previously played for the Anaheim Ducks of the NHL and HK Dukla Michalovce of the Slovak Extraliga. He has represented Slovakia national team several times and won a bronze medal with them at the 2022 Winter Olympics.

== Playing career ==
During the 2021–22 season, he recorded 15 goals and 24 assists in 43 games for HK Dukla Michalovce. He was the top scorer in the Extraliga among players 22 and under.

Following two break-out seasons with Dukla Michalovce, Regenda was originally signed to a contract in the Czech Extraliga with BK Mladá Boleslav on 1 May 2022. However, after a strong showing in the World Championships, Regenda used his National Hockey League (NHL) out-clause to break his contract with BK Mladá Boleslav, and on 1 June 2022, he was signed by the Anaheim Ducks to a two-year, entry-level contract beginning with the 2022–23 NHL season. He began the season with the Ducks, registering two points in five games. On 31 October 2022, he was assigned to the Ducks' American Hockey League (AHL) affiliate, the San Diego Gulls. He was recalled by the Ducks and scored his first NHL goal against Filip Gustavsson in a 4–1 loss to the Minnesota Wild on 9 November 2022. Regenda continued to bounce between the NHL and AHL for the season, finishing with 14 games played with Anaheim, scoring one goal and three points.

Regenda was invited to the Ducks 2023 training camp, but was assigned to the Gulls on 4 October 2023 to begin the 2023–24 season. After a series of trades left the team shorthanded, Regenda was recalled on 6 March 2024 and made his NHL season debut that night for the Ducks in a 2–1 win over the Ottawa Senators. He was returned to San Diego on 8 March. Regenda was recalled again on 12 March. He appeared in four more games with the Ducks before being reassigned to San Diego on 18 March. On 5 July 2024, Regenda signed a one-year, two-way contract with the Ducks for the 2024–25 season. He was assigned to San Diego to start the 2024–25 season.

Midway through his third season in the Ducks organization, Regenda was traded to the San Jose Sharks on 22 January 2025, in exchange for forward Justin Bailey. In July 2025, he signed a one-year contract extension with the Sharks. On 3 January 2026, Regenda scored his first hat trick in the NHL in a game that the Sharks lost 7–3 to the Tampa Bay Lightning. Following being called up from the San Jose Barracuda in December 2025 through the start of the 2026 Winter Olympic break Regenda scored eight goals in thirteen games. Following the Olympic break, he played in just seven games with one goals scored and was healthy scratched for nineteen games.

He signed for Swedish club HV71 on 17 September 2026.

== International play ==
Medal record

Representing Slovakia

Ice hockey

Olympic Games
Bronze medal – third place	2022 Beijing	

Regenda represented Slovakia at the 2017 IIHF World U18 Championships and recorded one assist in five games. He then represented Slovakia at the 2019 World Junior Ice Hockey Championships and recorded one goal, and two assists in five games.

On 18 January 2022, he was named to the roster to represent Slovakia at the 2022 Winter Olympics. He recorded one goal and three assists in seven games and won a bronze medal.

Regenda was named to the Slovak Olympic team for the 2026 Winter Olympics, where he recorded three goals and two assists in six games.

== Career statistics ==
=== Regular season and playoffs ===
			Regular season					Playoffs
Season	Team	League	GP	G	A	Pts	PIM	GP	G	A	Pts	PIM
2014–15	HK Spišská Nová Ves	SVK U18	40	14	17	31	63	—	—	—	—	—
2014–15	HK Dukla Michalovce	SVK.2 U18	13	15	8	23	69	—	—	—	—	—
2015–16	Team Slovakia U18	SVK U20	34	5	8	13	22	—	—	—	—	—
2015–16	HK Dukla Michalovce	SVK U20	7	1	0	1	4	3	1	2	3	0
2016–17	Team Slovakia U18	SVK U20	44	15	22	37	28	—	—	—	—	—
2016–17	HK Dukla Trenčín	SVK U18	—	—	—	—	—	4	3	3	6	4
2016–17	HK Dukla Trenčín	SVK U20	—	—	—	—	—	11	1	3	4	8
2017–18	Linköpings HC	J20	44	7	3	10	24	1	0	0	0	0
2018–19	Växjö Lakers	J20	42	11	16	27	18	2	0	1	1	2
2019–20	Jokerit	Jr. A	47	15	18	33	88	1	0	0	0	0
2019–20	Kiekko–Vantaa	Mestis	1	0	1	1	0	—	—	—	—	—
2020–21	HK Dukla Michalovce	Slovak	50	11	14	25	64	12	4	3	7	2
2021–22	HK Dukla Michalovce	Slovak	43	15	24	39	55	6	5	1	6	8
2022–23	Anaheim Ducks	NHL	14	1	2	3	4	—	—	—	—	—
2022–23	San Diego Gulls	AHL	50	13	12	25	66	—	—	—	—	—
2023–24	San Diego Gulls	AHL	54	19	15	34	57	—	—	—	—	—
2023–24	Anaheim Ducks	NHL	5	0	0	0	2	—	—	—	—	—
2024–25	San Diego Gulls	AHL	36	4	12	16	36	—	—	—	—	—
2024–25	San Jose Barracuda	AHL	36	9	16	25	30	6	3	0	3	0
2025–26	San Jose Barracuda	AHL	28	4	8	12	16	—	—	—	—	—
2025–26	San Jose Sharks	NHL	24	9	1	10	20	—	—	—	—	—
Slovak totals			93	26	38	64	119	18	9	4	13	10
NHL totals			43	10	3	13	26	—	—	—	—	—

=== International ===
Year	Team	Event	Result	GP	G	A	Pts	PIM
2017	Slovakia	WJC18	6th	5	0	1	1	0
2019	Slovakia	WJC	8th	5	1	2	3	2
2022	Slovakia	OG	3rd place, bronze medalist(s)	7	1	3	4	6
2022	Slovakia	WC	8th	8	5	1	6	4
2023	Slovakia	WC	9th	7	2	2	4	2
2024	Slovakia	WC	7th	8	1	3	4	12
2024	Slovakia	OGQ	Q	3	2	0	2	12
2025	Slovakia	WC	11th	6	1	1	2	29
2026	Slovakia	OG	4th	6	3	2	5	6
Junior totals				13	1	3	4	2
Senior totals				45	15	12	27	69
