= Rebeka Cully =

Slovak ski mountaineer, triathlete and cyclist (born 1995)

Personal information
- Born: 7 September 1995 (age 30) Martin, Slovakia

Sport
- Country: Slovakia
- Sport: Ski mountaineering, triathlon, cycling

Rebeka Cully (née Rizmanová; born 7 September 1995) is a Slovak ski mountaineer, triathlete, cyclist and professional physiotherapist.

== Early life and career ==
From the age of three to seventeen, Cully was a swimmer. Her father took her to triathlon races in the summer to make up for the lack of training. She stated that she would not call herself a full-time athlete, because she trains very little, but is lucky that she can get good results nonetheless.

Cully graduated in physiotherapy in the Netherlands, has professional experience in a diagnostic center focusing on spiroergometry and 3D running analysis.

== Career ==
Cully competes in triathlons in the summer and ski mountaineering in the winter. She has been competitively involved in ski mountaineering since 2001. She is also a former professional cyclist for Dukla Banská Bystrica, a three-time Slovak time trial champion and a vice-world orienteering champion.

In January 2025, Cully won the Skialp Race Martinky. She also became the Slovak champion at the MSR Kubínska hoľa in the vertical discipline. In February 2025, in Boí Taúll, she finished in 43rd place in the sprint and, together with Jakub Šiarnik, the same place in the relay. In April 2025, in Tromsø, she finished in 19th place in the sprint and 32nd in the individual.

In December 2025, during the first race of the 2025–26 ISMF Ski Mountaineering World Cup, Marianna Jagerčíková won a place for her at the 2026 Winter Olympics. Cully finished 19th in this World Cup race. Jagerčíková finished 4th, earning Slovakia the right to two representatives.

Cully is a member of the Aone Nutrition team, the center is VŠC Dukla Banská Bystrica. The trainer is her husband Ján Andrej Cully.

== Personal life ==
Cully and her husband Ján Andrej Cully have a son, Matteo (born 2022).
