= Susan Külm =

Estonian biathlete (born 1996)

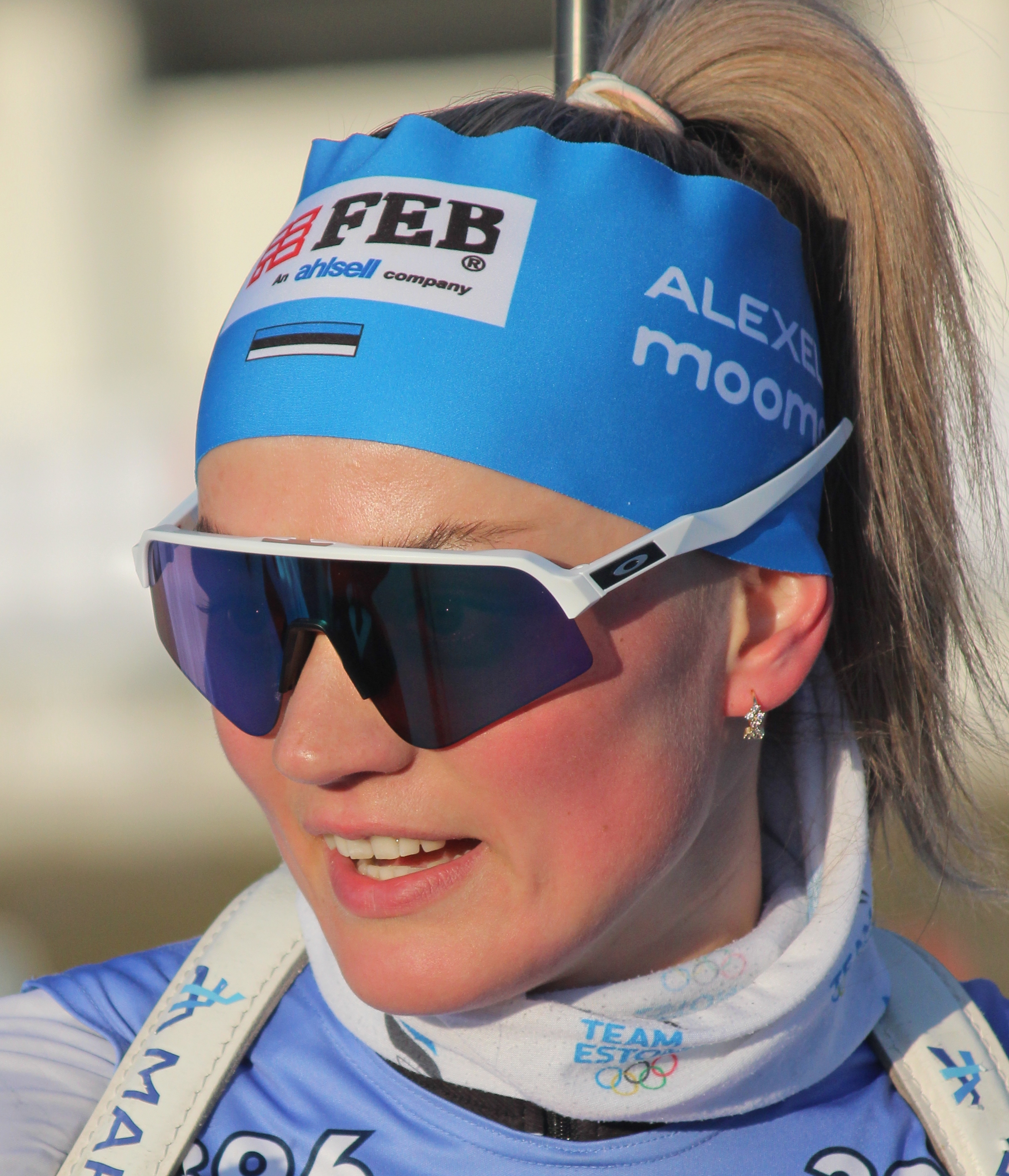
- Külm in Nové Město, March 2023

Personal information
- Nationality: Estonian
- Born: 13 August 1996 (age 29) Tallinn, Estonia

Sport
- Sport: Biathlon

Susan Külm (born 13 August 1996) is an Estonian biathlete. She competed at the 2022 Winter Olympics, in Women's pursuit, Women's relay, Women's individual, and Women's sprint. She competed at the 2021–22 Biathlon World Cup.

== Biathlon results ==
All results are sourced from the International Biathlon Union.

=== Olympic Games ===
Event	Individual	Sprint	Pursuit	Mass start	Relay	Mixed relay
(China) 2022 Beijing	82nd	44th	45th	—	15th	—
(Italy) 2026 Milano Cortina	28th	37th	22nd	—	14th	15th

=== World Championships ===
Event	Individual	Sprint	Pursuit	Mass start	Relay	Mixed relay	Single mixed relay
(Germany) 2023 Oberhof	59th	60th	39th	—	10th	15th	—
(Czech Republic) 2024 Nové Město	62nd	41st	27th	—	4th	—	11th
(Switzerland) 2025 Lenzerheide	47th	36th	39th	—	10th	13th	—
