= Patrik Koch =

Slovak ice hockey player (born 1996)

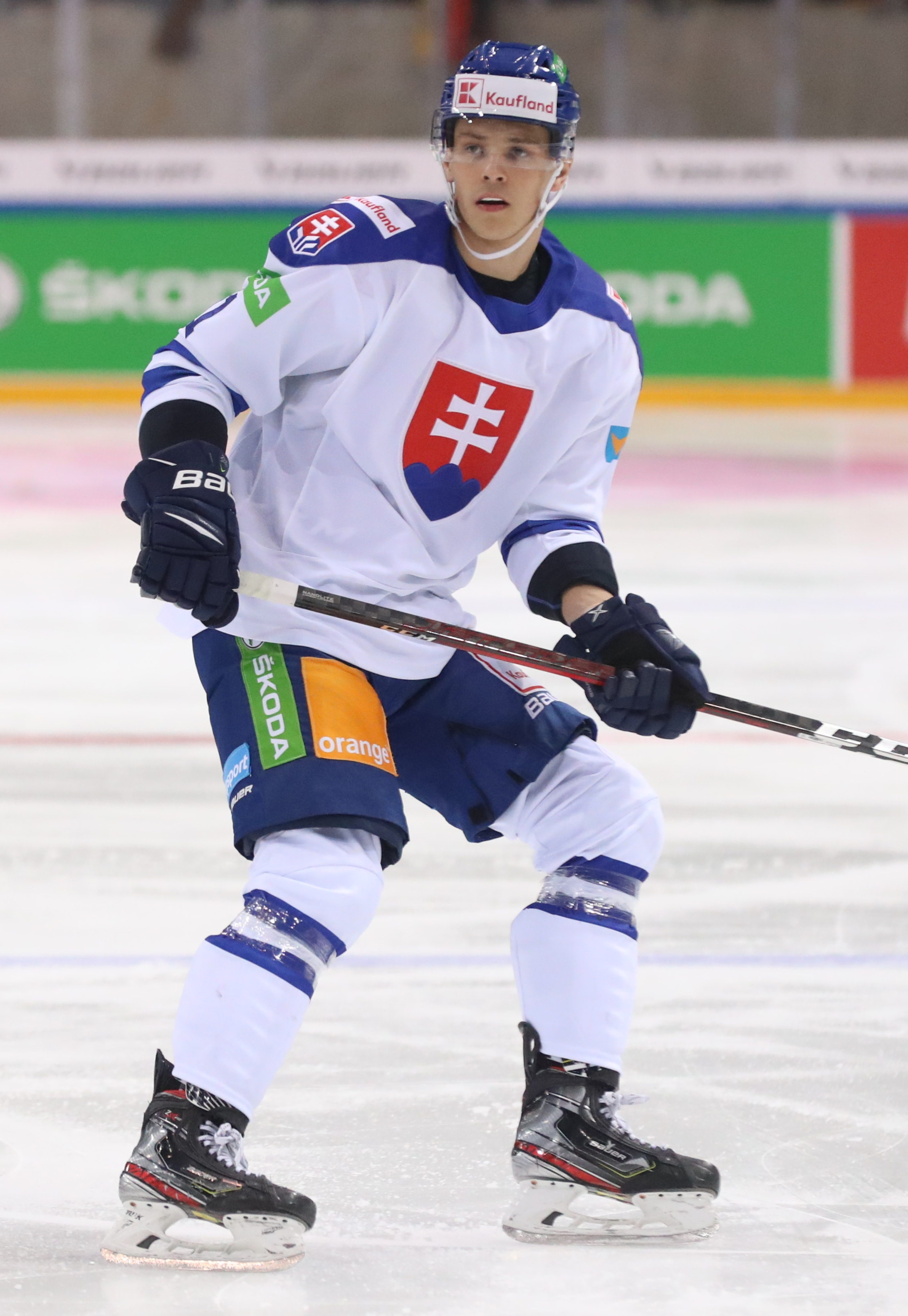
- Koch in 2019
- Born: 8 December 1996 (age 29) Bratislava, Slovakia
- Height: 6 ft 1 in (185 cm)
- Weight: 185 lb (84 kg; 13 st 3 lb)
- Position: Defence
- Shoots: Left
- ELH team Former teams: HC Oceláři Třinec; HC Košice; HC Vítkovice Ridera; Arizona Coyotes
- National team: Slovakia
- NHL draft: Undrafted
- Playing career: 2015–present

Patrik Koch (born 8 December 1996) is a Slovak professional ice hockey player who is a defenceman for HC Oceláři Třinec of the HC Oceláři Třinec (ELH).

== Playing career ==
Koch made his Czech Extraliga debut playing with HC Kometa Brno during the 2015–16 Czech Extraliga season.

On 5 June 2023, following the completion of his eighth professional European season, Koch signed as an undrafted free agent to a one-year, entry-level contract with the Arizona Coyotes of the NHL.

Entering his final season under NHL contract with the Utah Mammoth in 2024–25, Koch was assigned to continue his tenure with affiliate, the Tucson Roadrunners of the AHL. He made 10 appearances with the Roadrunners before he was loaned by Utah in a return to the Czech Extraliga to join HC Oceláři Třinec on 26 November 2024.

== Career statistics ==
=== Regular season and playoffs ===
			Regular season					Playoffs
Season	Team	League	GP	G	A	Pts	PIM	GP	G	A	Pts	PIM
2011–12	HC Kometa Brno	CZE U18	8	0	0	0	2	—	—	—	—	—
2012–13	HC Kometa Brno	CZE U18	41	12	10	22	74	3	1	0	1	14
2013–14	EC Salzburg	EBYSL	10	1	6	7	10	—	—	—	—	—
2013–14	RB Hockey Juniors	MHL	21	0	1	1	12	—	—	—	—	—
2014–15	Des Moines Buccaneers	USHL	23	3	4	7	35	—	—	—	—	—
2014–15	Soo Eagles	NAHL	24	2	3	5	42	7	0	1	1	2
2015–16	Team Slovakia U20	Slovak	20	1	0	1	20	—	—	—	—	—
2015–16	Team Slovakia U20	Slovak.1	11	3	0	3	10	—	—	—	—	—
2015–16	HC Kometa Brno	ELH	7	0	0	0	6	—	—	—	—	—
2015–16	SK Horácká Slavia Třebíč	Czech.1	2	0	0	0	0	—	—	—	—	—
2016–17	HC Kometa Brno	ELH	1	0	0	0	0	—	—	—	—	—
2016–17	SK Horácká Slavia Třebíč	Czech.1	22	3	0	3	48	—	—	—	—	—
2016–17	HC Košice	SVK U20	1	0	0	0	12	—	—	—	—	—
2016–17	HC Košice	Slovak	24	1	0	1	37	4	0	0	0	2
2017–18	HC Košice	Slovak	43	0	3	3	22	5	0	0	0	6
2017–18	HC Prešov	Slovak.1	3	0	4	4	2	—	—	—	—	—
2018–19	HC Košice	Slovak	55	4	13	17	100	6	0	1	1	0
2019–20	HC Košice	Slovak	51	0	13	13	87	—	—	—	—	—
2020–21	HC Vítkovice	ELH	47	1	5	6	98	5	0	1	1	6
2021–22	HC Vítkovice	ELH	55	2	3	5	92	6	0	2	2	2
2022–23	HC Vítkovice	ELH	46	3	9	12	69	13	2	2	4	17
2023–24	Tucson Roadrunners	AHL	63	1	14	15	97	2	0	0	0	0
2023–24	Arizona Coyotes	NHL	1	0	0	0	10	—	—	—	—	—
2024–25	Tucson Roadrunners	AHL	10	0	2	2	18	—	—	—	—	—
Slovak totals			193	6	29	35	266	15	0	1	1	8
ELH totals			156	6	17	23	265	24	2	5	7	25
NHL totals			1	0	0	0	10	—	—	—	—	—

=== International ===
Year	Team	Event	Result	GP	G	A	Pts	PIM
2013	Slovakia	U17	10th	5	0	0	0	6
2013	Slovakia	IH18	8th	4	0	0	0	6
2014	Slovakia	U18	8th	5	0	0	0	4
2016	Slovakia	WJC	7th	5	1	0	1	4
2019	Slovakia	WC	9th	7	0	2	2	4
2023	Slovakia	WC	9th	7	1	3	4	4
2024	Slovakia	WC	7th	8	1	3	4	6
2024	Slovakia	OGQ	Q	3	0	0	0	2
2025	Slovakia	WC	11th	7	0	0	0	4
2026	Slovakia	OG	4th	5	0	2	2	4
2026	Slovakia	WC	9th	7	0	1	1	6
Junior totals				19	1	0	1	20
Senior totals				44	2	11	13	30
