= Adam Ružička =

Slovak ice hockey player (born 1999)

- Born: 11 May 1999 (age 27) Bratislava, Slovakia
- Height: 6 ft 4 in (193 cm)
- Weight: 215 lb (98 kg; 15 st 5 lb)
- Position: Centre
- Shoots: Left
- KHL team Former teams: Avtomobilist Yekaterinburg; Calgary Flames; Arizona Coyotes; Spartak Moscow
- National team: Slovakia
- NHL draft: 109th overall, 2017; Calgary Flames
- Playing career: 2019–present

Adam Ružička (born 11 May 1999) is a Slovak professional ice hockey player who is a centre for Avtomobilist Yekaterinburg of the Kontinental Hockey League (KHL). He has previously played for the Calgary Flames and Arizona Coyotes of the National Hockey League (NHL), and Spartak Moscow of the KHL.

Growing up in Slovakia, Ružička trained at various ice hockey schools before joining Dynamo Pardubice's under-20 team. His offensive abilities earned him attention from the Kontinental Hockey League (KHL) and he was eventually drafted 14th overall by the Slovan Bratislava in the KHL Junior Draft. However, Ružička chose to move to North America and play with the Sarnia Sting and Sudbury Wolves of the Ontario Hockey League (OHL). After being taken 109th overall by the Calgary Flames in the 2017 NHL entry draft, he developed within their system, playing in the American Hockey League (AHL) for the Stockton Heat.

== Early life ==
Ružička was born on 11 May 1999, in Bratislava, Slovakia, to parents Iveta and Eduard. His father initially wished to enrol him in tennis but his mother persuaded him to choose ice hockey instead. Growing up, he played the position of centre and favoured Czech native Jaromír Jágr of the Pittsburgh Penguins.

== Playing career ==
Growing up in Slovakia, Ružička trained at various hockey schools including Svišťov run by Adriana Hostůovecká. He began playing organized hockey on various youth teams of Slovan Bratislava before joining Dynamo Pardubice's under-20 team. While with the under-20 team, Ružička accumulated 30 points through 30 games, before representing Slovakia at the 2016 World U18 Championships. In order to continue playing hockey, Ružička and his mother lived in Pardubice for two years and he trained with an English tutor to improve his language skills. His offensive abilities earned him attention from the Kontinental Hockey League (KHL) and he was eventually drafted 14th overall by the Slovan Bratislava in the KHL Junior Draft. The Sarnia Sting of the Ontario Hockey League (OHL) also selected Ružička in the second round of the 2016 CHL Import Draft. He eventually chose to move to North America due to the disadvantage he experienced as a foreign player in the Czech Republic.

=== Major junior ===
Ružička moved to North America and joined the Sting for the 2016–17 season. By December 2016, he ranked among the top five rookies in the CHL after tallying 12 goals and 22 points in Sarnia. During the month of December, Ružička recorded a career-high four points in a 5–4 win over the Guelph Storm and earned Player of the Week honors for the week ending 11 December 2016. He was also chosen to represent Team Cherry at the 2017 CHL/NHL Top Prospects Game as a 2017 NHL entry draft eligible player. In January 2017, Ružička was ranked 27th among all eligible North American skaters by the NHL Central Scouting Bureau (CSS). Ružička continued to improve as the season continued and scored 12 goals and 10 assists through the first 32 games of the season. Following this, he stated that he was still adapting to the Canadian style of hockey and hoped to improve during the remainder of the season. In March, he was named the OHL Rookie of the Month of February after he led all rookies with 12 points to help the Sting qualify for the Western Conference playoffs.

Ružička finished fourth on the Sting in 2016–17 with 25 goals and 21 assists for 46 points through 61 games. Ružička's season earned him a spot on the end-of-season OHL Second All-Rookie Team and earned him some consideration as a prospect eligible for the NHL entry draft. The CSS also ranked Ružička as the 37th-best North American skater eligible for the 2017 draft in their final rankings. Likewise, he was ranked 48th overall by the International Scouting Services and 59th overall by Future Considerations. Prior to the draft, hockey pundit Bob McKenzie placed Ružička 77th on his draft board.

The Calgary Flames selected Ružička in the fourth round, 109th overall, of the 2017 draft. Following the draft, Flames' scout Fred Parker praised his skills but acknowledged that he still struggled to figure out the North American game. He subsequently participated in the Flames' NHL Rookie Camp before returning to the Sting for the 2017–18 OHL season. During the 2017–18 season, he posted 36 goals and 72 points in 63 games, before being traded to the Sudbury Wolves during the 2018–19 season in exchange for three draft picks.

Ružička finished strong with the Wolves, tallying 24 goals and 41 points in 30 games to conclude the regular season. He also contributed 10 points in eight playoff games with Sudbury. On 12 April 2019, following the conclusion of the Wolves' season, Ružička signed a three-year entry-level contract with the Flames.

=== Professional ===
Ružička spent his entire first professional season with the Calgary Flames' American Hockey League (AHL) affiliate, the Stockton Heat, and posted 27 points (10 goals, 17 assists) in 54 games. Due to the ongoing COVID-19 pandemic, the Heat played the 2020–21 season in Calgary as part of a newly formed Canadian Division. Stockton ultimately finished with an 11–17–2 record after losing 17 of its final 20 games. As a 21-year-old AHL sophomore, Ružička led the Heat with 11 goals and 21 points in 28 games. The Flames recalled Ružička from Stockton on 12 April 2021, but returned him to the AHL five days later without playing any NHL games. He set a Heat franchise record by recording four consecutive three-point games during the season. Ružička made his NHL debut on 16 May 2021 in a 6–5 overtime win over the Vancouver Canucks. He finished the season with three games played, registering one assist.

During the 2021–22 season Ružička split time between Calgary and Stockton, playing 28 games for the Flames, registering five goals and ten points, while playing 16 games for the Heat, scoring 11 goals and 20 points. He scored his first NHL goal on Adin Hill in a 5–3 loss to the San Jose Sharks on 7 December 2021. On 21 September 2022, Ružička signed a two-year extension keeping him in Calgary. He began the 2022–23 season in great form, scoring 20 points in his first 25 games, playing on the first line. However, his play declined and he was shuffled lower in the lineup and eventually scratched all together. He was limited to just 19 games and fell out of favour with coach Darryl Sutter.

Ružička began the 2023–24 season with the Flames playing on the second line and was briefly playing at a point-a-game pace. However, his performance declined and he was replaced by rookies Connor Zary and Martin Pospíšil. He played in 30 games, scoring three goals and six assists, but was a healthy scratch in his final game with the Flames. He was placed on waivers on 24 January 2024.

On 25 January 2024, Ružička was claimed off of waivers by the Arizona Coyotes. He played in three games with the Coyotes, going scoreless. On 23 February 2024, the Coyotes placed Ružička on unconditional waivers with the intention to terminate his contract, after Ružička posted a video of himself on Instagram with a white powder resembling cocaine.

On 29 May 2024, Ružička was signed to a one-year contract by Spartak Moscow of the Kontinental Hockey League (KHL), playing alongside his brother-in-law.

After a successful debut season in the KHL, Ružička was re-signed to a two-year contract extension beginning from the 2025–26 season on 21 August 2025.

Upon completion of his second season with Spartak, Ružička was released from his contract and his playing rights were traded to Avtomobilist Yekaterinburg in exchange for financial compensation. On 12 August 2026, he was signed to a one-year deal with Avtomobilist for the 2026–27 season.

== Career statistics ==
=== Regular season and playoffs ===
			Regular season					Playoffs
Season	Team	League	GP	G	A	Pts	PIM	GP	G	A	Pts	PIM
2016–17	Sarnia Sting	OHL	61	25	21	46	30	4	0	2	2	0
2017–18	Sarnia Sting	OHL	63	36	36	72	40	12	0	3	3	6
2018–19	Sarnia Sting	OHL	35	11	26	37	22	—	—	—	—	—
2018–19	Sudbury Wolves	OHL	30	24	17	41	14	8	3	7	10	4
2019–20	Stockton Heat	AHL	54	10	17	27	12	—	—	—	—
2020–21	Stockton Heat	AHL	28	11	10	21	10	—	—	—	—	—
2020–21	Calgary Flames	NHL	3	0	1	1	4	—	—	—	—	—
2021–22	Stockton Heat	AHL	16	11	9	20	2	2	0	0	0	0
2021–22	Calgary Flames	NHL	28	5	5	10	8	—	—	—	—	—
2022–23	Calgary Flames	NHL	44	6	14	20	8	—	—	—	—	—
2023–24	Calgary Flames	NHL	39	3	6	9	6	—	—	—	—	—
2023–24	Arizona Coyotes	NHL	3	0	0	0	6	—	—	—	—	—
2024–25	Spartak Moscow	KHL	65	26	19	45	35	12	7	5	12	6
2025–26	Spartak Moscow	KHL	51	16	24	40	18	—	—	—	—	—
NHL totals			117	14	26	40	32	—	—	—	—	—
KHL totals			116	42	43	85	53	12	7	5	12	6

=== International ===
Year	Team	Event	Result	GP	G	A	Pts	PIM
2014	Slovakia	U17	8th	5	1	0	1	2
2015	Slovakia	IH18	8th	4	1	1	2	2
2016	Slovakia	U18	5th	5	2	2	4	4
2016	Slovakia	IH18	7th	4	2	2	4	2
2017	Slovakia	U18	6th	5	2	3	5	6
2017	Slovakia	WJC	8th	5	1	0	1	2
2018	Slovakia	WJC	7th	5	0	2	2	2
2019	Slovakia	WJC	8th	5	2	1	3	4
2021	Slovakia	OGQ	Q	3	2	0	2	4
2026	Slovakia	OG	4th	6	2	3	5	2
Junior totals				38	11	11	22	24
Senior totals				9	4	3	7	6

== Awards and honours ==
Award	Year	Ref
OHL
OHL Second All-Rookie Team	2017	
