= Marianna Jagerčíková =

Slovak ski mountaineer (born 1985)

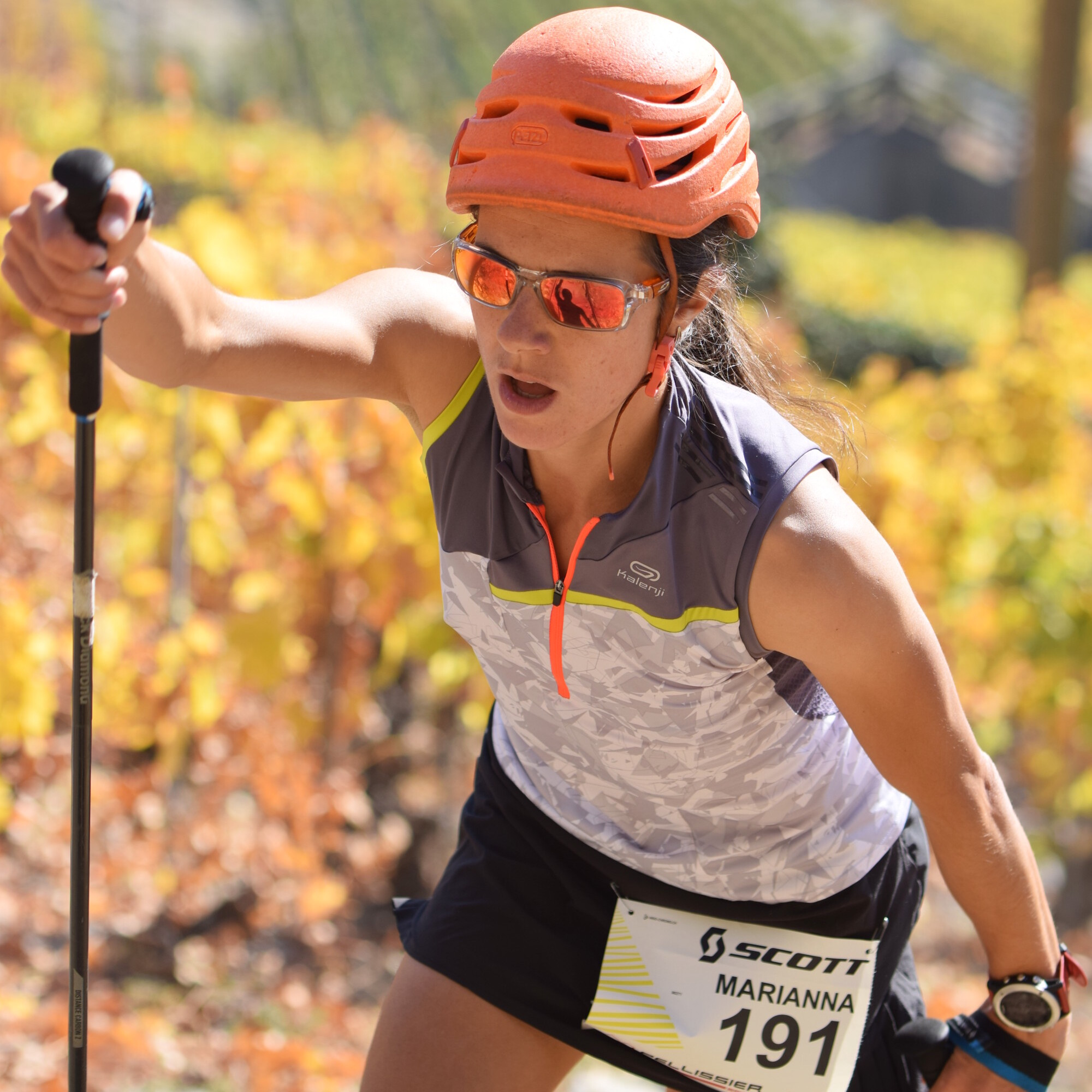
- Jagerčíková in 2017

Personal information
- Born: 9 September 1985 (age 40) Brezno, Slovakia
- Height: 1.63 m (5 ft 4 in)
- Weight: 51 kg (112 lb)

Sport
- Country: Slovakia
- Sport: Ski mountaineering
Medal record
Women's ski mountaineering
Representing Slovakia
World Championships
Gold medal – first place	2023 Boí Taüll	Sprint race
Silver medal – second place	2019 Villars-sur-Ollon	Sprint race
Silver medal – second place	2021 Comapedrosa	Sprint race
European Championships
Gold medal – first place	2022 Boí Taüll	Sprint race
Bronze medal – third place	2024 Flaine / Chamonix	Sprint race

Marianna Jagerčíková (born 9 September 1985) is a Slovak ski mountaineer. She will represent Slovakia at the 2026 Winter Olympics.

== Career ==
Jagerčíková made her World Championships debut in 2019 and won a silver medal in the sprint race. She again won a silver medal in the sprint race in 2021.

She competed at the 2022 European Championships and won a gold medal in the sprint race with a time of 3:11.279. She then competed at the 2023 World Championship of Ski Mountaineering and won a gold medal in the sprint race with a time of 3:11.034.

During the first race of the 2025–26 ISMF Ski Mountaineering World Cup on 7 December 2025, she finished in fourth place in the sprint event. She also finished in fourth place in the Olympic qualification rankings, and qualified to represent Slovakia at the 2026 Winter Olympics.
