= Šimon Adamov =

Slovak biathlete and cross-country skier (born 2004)

Personal information
- Nationality: Slovak
- Born: 18 November 2004 (age 21) Martin, Slovakia
- Years active: 2023–present
- Height: 184 cm (6 ft 0 in)
- Weight: 75 kg (165 lb; 11 st 11 lb)

Sport
- Country: Slovakia
- Sport: Biathlon
- Club: TJ Tatran Hybe

Šimon Adamov (born 18 November 2004 in Martin) is a Slovak biathlete and cross-country skier. He made his Biathlon World Cup debut in 2024. He also represented Slovakia at the 2026 Winter Olympics in Milan and Cortina.

== Early life ==
Adamov grew up in the village of Nižná Boca below the High Tatras, where he skied since childhood and got into the sport at a young age. He started competing in the youth categories for the club TJ Tatran Hybe. His father, Michal Adamov, was his coach.

== Career ==
At the 2023 Junior IBU Cup in Pokljuka, Adamov finished in fourth place in the 15 km endurance race.

At the 2026 Winter Olympics, he made his debut in the 4x6 km mixed relay with Jakub Borguľa, Paulína Bátovská Fialková and Anastasía Kuzminová, where they finished 19th with a time of 1:09:06.5, 11 reps and no penalty lap. In the men's 20 km individual endurance race, he finished 82nd with seven penalty minutes.
