= Biathlon at the 2026 Winter Olympics =

Biathlon at the XXV Olympic Winter Games
- Biathlon pictogram
- Venue: Anterselva Biathlon Arena
- Dates: 8–21 February
- No. of events: 11 (5 men, 5 women, 1 mixed)

Biathlon at the 2026 Winter Olympics was held at the Anterselva Biathlon Arena in Rasen-Antholz from 8 to 21 February 2026.

A total of 11 events were contested, five for men, five for women and one mixed.

== Competition schedule ==
The following is the competition schedule for all eleven events.

All times are in local time (UTC+1).

Date	Time	Event
8 February	14:05	Mixed 4 × 6 km relay
10 February	13:30	Men's 20 km individual
11 February	14:00	Women's 15 km individual
13 February	14:00	Men's 10 km sprint
14 February	14:45	Women's 7.5 km sprint
15 February	11:15	Men's 12.5 km pursuit
15 February	14:45	Women's 10 km pursuit
17 February	14:30	Men's 4 × 7.5 km relay
18 February	14:45	Women's 4 × 6 km relay
20 February	14:15	Men's 15 km mass start
21 February	14:15	Women's 12.5 km mass start

== Medal summary ==
=== Medal table ===
* Host nation (Italy)

Rank	Nation	Gold	Silver	Bronze	Total
1	France	6	4	3	13
2	Norway	3	5	3	11
3	Sweden	1	1	1	3
4	Italy*	1	1	0	2
5	Bulgaria	0	0	1	1
5	Czech Republic	0	0	1	1
5	Finland	0	0	1	1
5	Germany	0	0	1	1
Totals (8 entries)		11	11	11	33

=== Men's events ===
Event	Gold		Silver		Bronze	
Individual	Johan-Olav Botn; Norway	51:31.5	Éric Perrot; France	51:46.3	Sturla Holm Lægreid; Norway	52:19.8
Sprint	Quentin Fillon Maillet; France	22:53.1	Vetle Sjåstad Christiansen; Norway	23:06.8	Sturla Holm Lægreid; Norway	23:09.0
Pursuit	Martin Ponsiluoma; Sweden	31:11.9	Sturla Holm Lægreid; Norway	31:32.5	Émilien Jacquelin; France	31:41.6
Mass start	Johannes Dale-Skjevdal; Norway	39:17.1	Sturla Holm Lægreid; Norway	39:27.6	Quentin Fillon Maillet; France	39:42.7
Relay	France; Fabien Claude; Émilien Jacquelin; Quentin Fillon Maillet; Éric Perrot	1:19:55.2	Norway; Martin Uldal; Johan-Olav Botn; Sturla Holm Lægreid; Vetle Sjåstad Christiansen	1:20:05.0	Sweden; Viktor Brandt; Jesper Nelin; Martin Ponsiluoma; Sebastian Samuelsson	1:20:52.7

=== Women's events ===
Event	Gold		Silver		Bronze	
Individual	Julia Simon; France	41:15.6	Lou Jeanmonnot; France	42:08.7	Lora Hristova; Bulgaria	42:20.1
Sprint	Maren Kirkeeide; Norway	20:40.8	Océane Michelon; France	20:44.6	Lou Jeanmonnot; France	21:04.5
Pursuit	Lisa Vittozzi; Italy	30:11.8	Maren Kirkeeide; Norway	30:40.6	Suvi Minkkinen; Finland	30:46.1
Mass start	Océane Michelon; France	37:18.1	Julia Simon; France	37:24.7	Tereza Voborníková; Czech Republic	37:25.5
Relay	France; Camille Bened; Lou Jeanmonnot; Océane Michelon; Julia Simon	1:10:22.7	Sweden; Linn Gestblom; Anna Magnusson; Elvira Öberg; Hanna Öberg	1:11:14.0	Norway; Marthe Kråkstad Johansen; Juni Arnekleiv; Karoline Offigstad Knotten; Maren Kirkeeide	1:11:30.3

=== Mixed event ===
Event	Gold		Silver		Bronze	
Relay	France; Éric Perrot; Quentin Fillon Maillet; Lou Jeanmonnot; Julia Simon	1:04:15.5	Italy; Tommaso Giacomel; Lukas Hofer; Dorothea Wierer; Lisa Vittozzi	1:04:41.3	Germany; Justus Strelow; Philipp Nawrath; Vanessa Voigt; Franziska Preuß	1:05:20.8
