= South Tyrol Arena =

Biathlon stadium in Rasen-Antholz, Italy

- Arena Alto Adige / Südtirol Arena
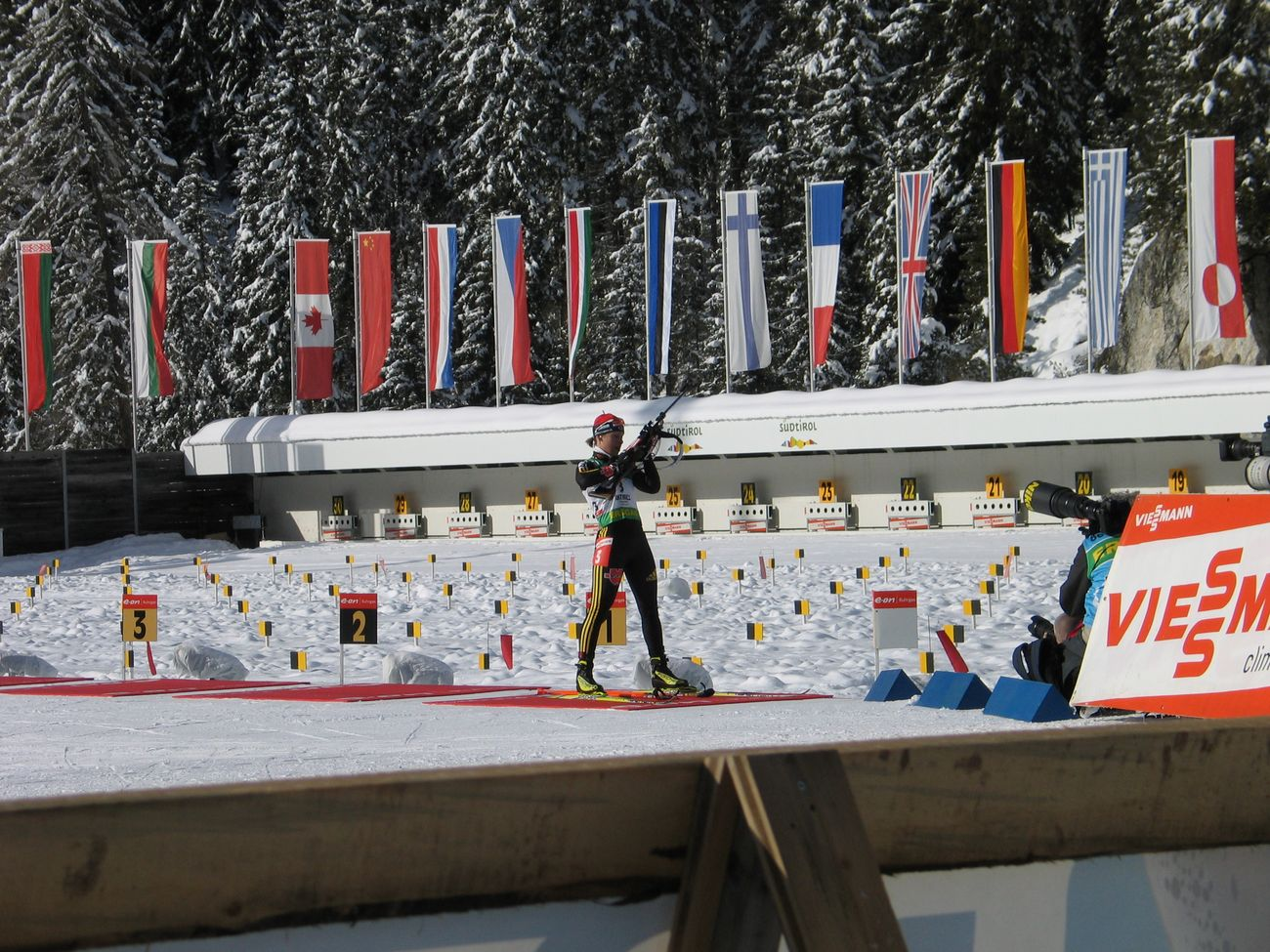
- 2009 World Cup
- Interactive map of South Tyrol Arena
- Address: Via Anterselva di Sopra/Obertalerstraße, 33
- Location: Rasen-Antholz
- Capacity: 3,000
- Type: stadium
- Event: sporting events
- Surface: snow
- Scoreboard: yes
- Record attendance: 23,000
- Public transit: Shuttle A-B

Construction
- Built: 1969
- Opened: 1971
- Renovated: 2006
- Expanded: 2006
- Cost: € 6.700.000

Website
- www.biathlon-antholz.it

Anterselva Biathlon Arena
- Location within Italy
- Coordinates: 46.88369°N 12.15252°E

The South Tyrol Arena (in Italian Arena Alto Adige; in German Südtirol Arena) is a biathlon stadium in the municipality of Rasen-Antholz, in South Tyrol (Italy).

== History ==
The facility, which began construction in 1969 and opened in 1971, has regularly hosted a stage of the Biathlon World Cup, as well as six editions of the Biathlon World Championships (1975, 1976, 1983, 1995, 2007, and 2020) and two editions of the Biathlon Junior World Championships (1975 and 1983).

The stadium was modernized from 2006: the grandstand for spectators was enlarged and a building was constructed for the competition judges. The total expenditure was 6.9 million euro.

2007 World Championship were attended by 117,000 spectators, with peaks of 23,000 on Saturday 10 February.

The facility hosted the biathlon competitions of the 2026 Winter Olympics of Milan-Cortina.

== Venue ==
The arena is located at the end of Antholz Valley (side valley of Puster Valley) at an altitude of 1600 m above sea level, near the Lake of Antholz. Antholz is usually the highest biathlon venue of the World Cup because Soldier Hollow is typically not part of the World Cup.

== Gallery ==
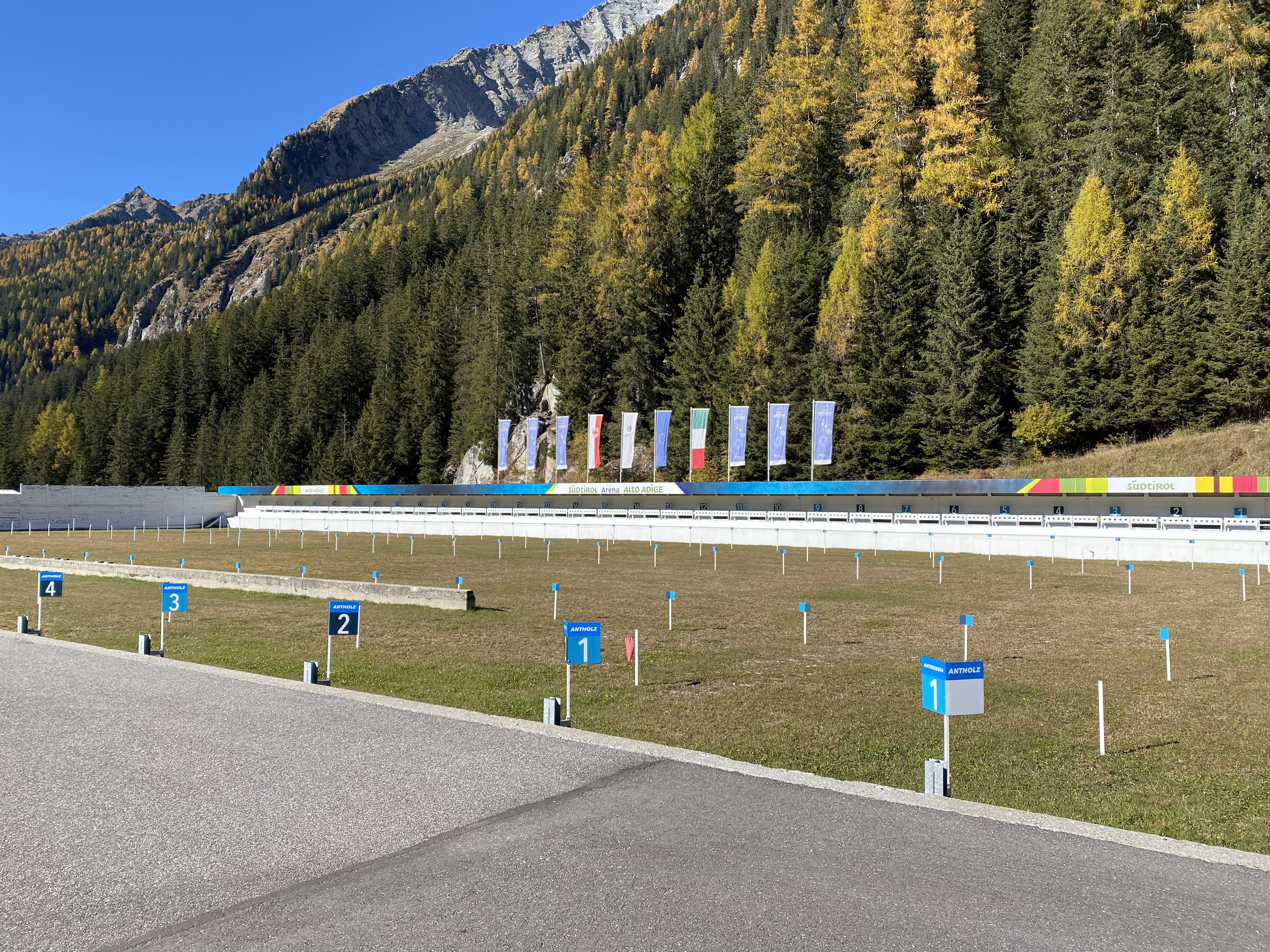
Shooting range in 2022

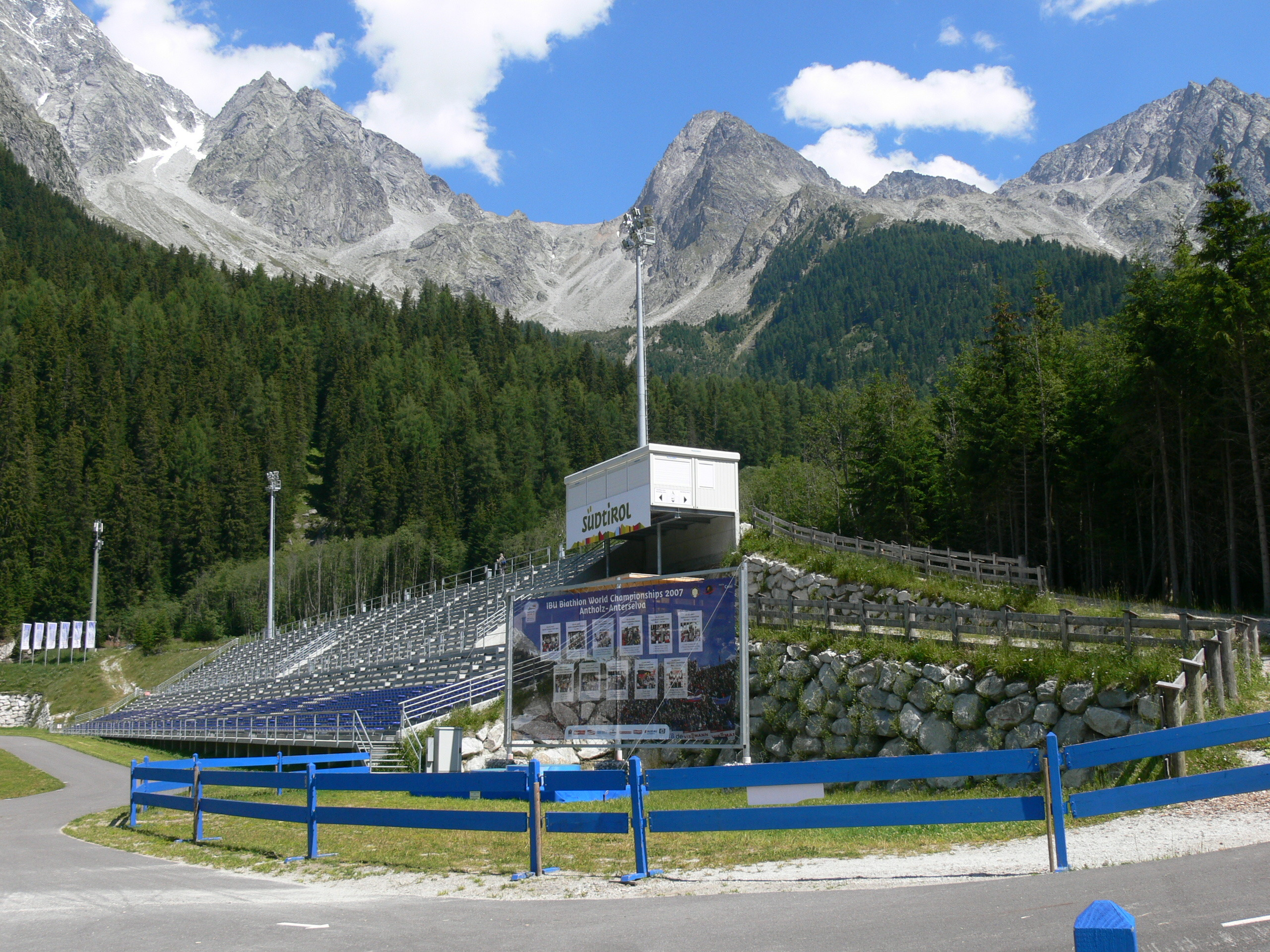
Stands at the venue

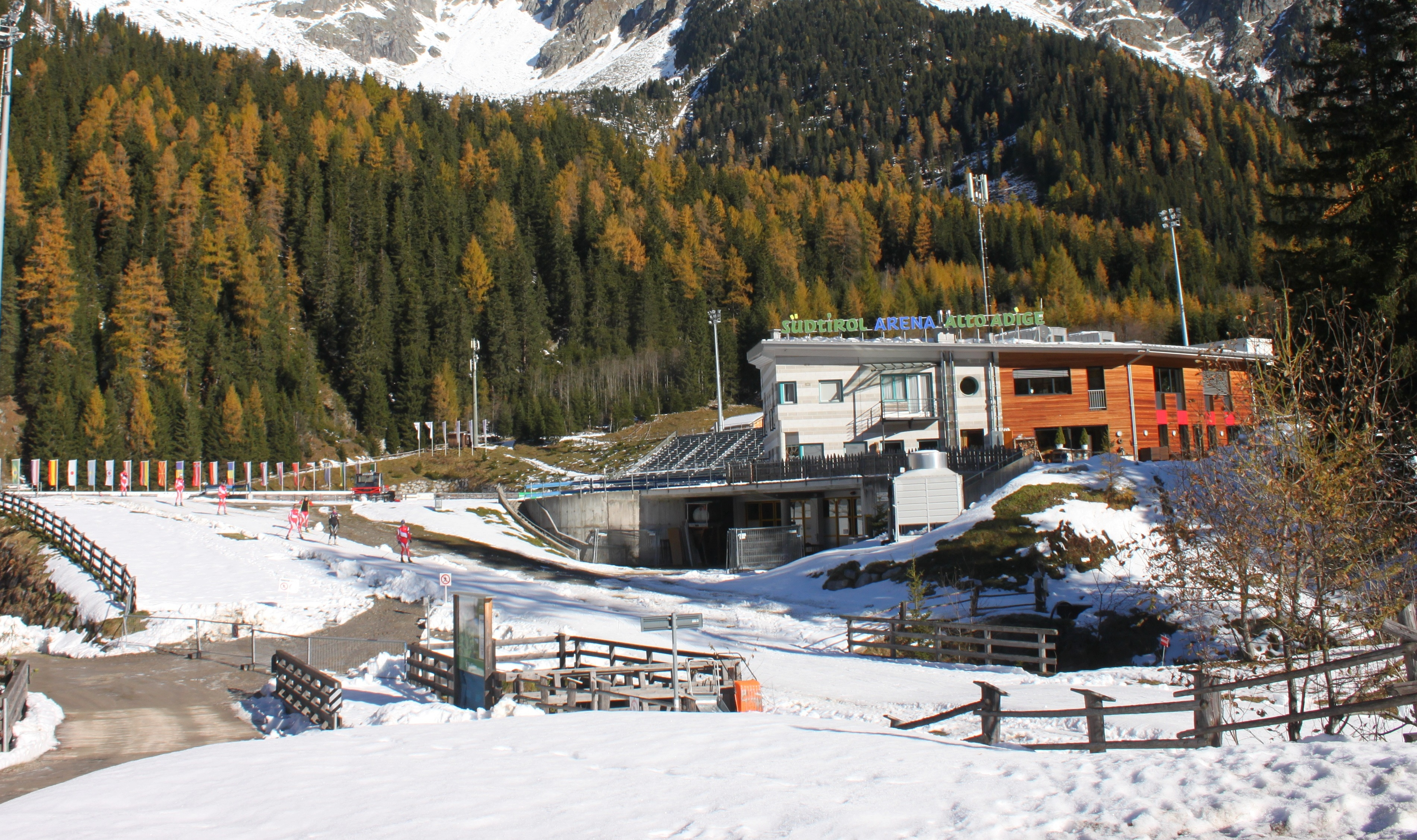
The venue in 2014
