= Jakub Borguľa =

Slovak biathlete (born 2004)

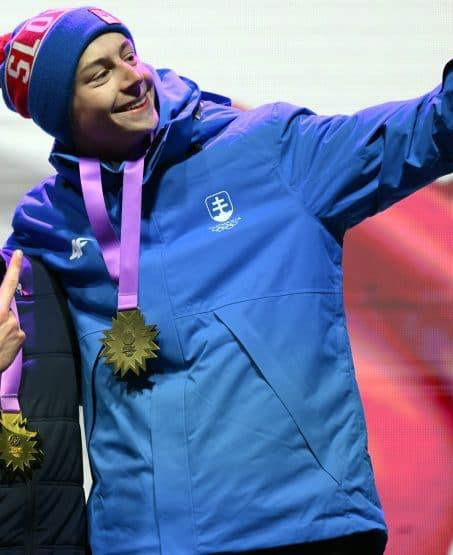
- Borguľa in 2022

Personal information
- Nationality: Slovak
- Born: 21 August 2004 (age 22) Graz, Austria

Sport
- Country: Slovakia
- Sport: Biathlon
Medal record
Men's biathlon
Representing Slovakia
Junior World Championships
Silver medal – second place	2025 Östersund	Sprint
Youth World Championships
Gold medal – first place	2022 Soldier Hollow	Pursuit
Gold medal – first place	2023 Shchuchinsk	Individual
Silver medal – second place	2022 Soldier Hollow	Individual
Silver medal – second place	2022 Soldier Hollow	Sprint

Jakub Borguľa (born 21 August 2004) is a Slovak biathlete who has competed in the Biathlon World Cup since 2024. He represented Slovakia at the 2026 Olympic Games.

Borguľa is a two-time world champion in the junior category, as well as a three-time silver medalist in the individual race, pursuit, and sprint.

== Biathlon results ==
All results are sourced from the International Biathlon Union.

=== Olympic Games ===
0 medals

Event	Individual	Sprint	Pursuit	Mass start	Relay	Mixed relay
(Italy) 2026 Milano Cortina	—	58th	56th	—	—	19th

=== World Championships ===
0 medals

Event	Individual	Sprint	Pursuit	Mass start	Relay	Mixed relay	Single mixed relay
(Switzerland) 2025 Lenzerheide	—	—	—	—	—	21st	21st

=== Youth and Junior World Championships ===
5 medals (2 gold, 3 silver)

Year	Age	Individual	Sprint	Pursuit	Mass Start	Relay	Mixed relay
(United States) 2022 Soldier Hollow	17	Silver	Silver	Gold	N/A	7th	N/A
(Kazakhstan) 2023 Shchuchinsk	18	Gold	36th	41st	N/A	7th	11th
(Estonia) 2024 Otepää	19	41st	20th	N/A	29th	13th	11th
(Sweden) 2025 Östersund	20	9th	Silver	N/A	42nd	7th	12th
