= List of flag bearers for Lithuania at the Olympics =

Lithuania at the Olympics
- IOC code: LTU
- NOC: National Olympic Committee of Lithuania
- Website: www.ltok.lt (in Lithuanian and English)
- Medals: Gold 6 Silver 9 Bronze 15 Total 30

Summer appearances
- 1924; 1928; 1932–1988; 1992; 1996; 2000; 2004; 2008; 2012; 2016; 2020; 2024

Winter appearances
- 1928; 1932–1988; 1992; 1994; 1998; 2002; 2006; 2010; 2014; 2018; 2022; 2026

Other related appearances
- Russian Empire (1908–1912); Soviet Union (1952–1988)

This is a list of flag bearers who have represented Lithuania at the Olympics.

Flag bearers carry the national flag of their country at the opening ceremony of the Olympic Games.

#	Event year	Season	Flag bearer	Sport
1	1928	Winter	Kęstutis Bulota	Speed skating
2	1928	Summer	Paulina Radziulytė	Athletics
3	1992	Winter	Gintaras Jasinskas	Biathlon
4	1992	Summer	Raimundas Mažuolis	Swimming
5	1994	Winter	Povilas Vanagas	Figure skating
6	1996	Summer	Raimundas Mažuolis	Swimming
7	1998	Winter	Povilas Vanagas	Figure skating
8	2000	Summer	Romas Ubartas	Athletics
9	2002	Winter	Ričardas Panavas	Cross-country skiing
10	2004	Summer	Saulius Štombergas	Basketball
11	2006	Winter	Vida Vencienė	Cross-country skiing
12	2008	Summer	Šarūnas Jasikevičius	Basketball
13	2010	Winter	Irina Terentjeva	Cross-country skiing
14	2012	Summer	Virgilijus Alekna	Athletics
15	2014	Winter	Deividas Stagniūnas	Figure skating
16	2016	Summer	Gintarė Scheidt	Laser Radial
17	2018	Winter	Tomas Kaukėnas	Biathlon
18	2020	Summer	Sandra Jablonskytė	Judo
18	2020	Summer	Giedrius Titenis	Swimming
19	2022	Winter	Deividas Kizala	Figure skating
19	2022	Winter	Paulina Ramanauskaitė	Figure skating
20	2024	Summer	Rytis Jasiūnas	Sailing
20	2024	Summer	Justina Vanagaitė	Equestrian
21	2026	Winter	Saulius Ambrulevičius	Figure skating
21	2026	Winter	Allison Reed	Figure skating

== See also ==
- Lithuania at the Olympics
