= Lithuania at the 1998 Winter Olympics =

- IOC code: LTU
- NOC: Lithuanian National Olympic Committee
- Website: www.ltok.lt (in Lithuanian and English)

in Nagano
- Competitors: 7 (5 men, 2 women) in 4 sports
- Flag bearer: Povilas Vanagas (figure skating)
- Medals: Gold 0 Silver 0 Bronze 0 Total 0

Winter Olympics appearances (overview)
- 1928; 1932–1988; 1992; 1994; 1998; 2002; 2006; 2010; 2014; 2018; 2022; 2026

Other related appearances
- Soviet Union (1956–1988)

Lithuania participated at the 1998 Winter Olympics in Nagano, Japan, held between 7 and 22 February 1998. The country's participation in the Games marked its fourth appearance at the Winter Olympics after its debut in the 1928 Games. The Lithuanian team consisted of seven athletes who competed in four sports. Povilas Vanagas served as the country's flag-bearer during the opening ceremony. Lithuania did not win any medal in the Games, and has not won a Winter Olympics medal previously.

== Background ==
The 1924 Summer Olympics marked Lithuania's first participation in the Olympic Games. The nation made its debut in the Winter Olympics at the 1928 Winter Olympics. After its debut in 1928, the country did not participate in the Winter Games till the 1992 Games. The Lithuanian National Olympic Committee was recognized by the International Olympic Committee (IOC) in 1991. The country's participation in the 1998 Games marked its fourth appearance at the Winter Olympics.

The 1998 Winter Olympics was held in Nagano, Japan, between 7 and 22 February 1998. The Lithuanian delegation consisted of seven athletes. Povilas Vanagas served as the country's flag-bearer in the Parade of Nations during the opening ceremony. Lithuania did not win any medal in the Games, and has not won a Winter Olympics medal previously.

== Competitors ==
Lithuania sent a contingent of seven athletes including two women who competed in four sports at the Games.

| Sport | Men | Women | Total |
|---|---|---|---|
| Alpine skiing | 1 | 0 | 1 |
| Biathlon | 1 | 0 | 1 |
| Cross-country skiing | 2 | 1 | 3 |
| Figure skating | 1 | 1 | 2 |
| Total | 5 | 2 | 7 |

== Alpine skiing ==
Alpine skiing competitions were held at Happo'one, Hakuba. Linas Vaitkus represented Lithuania in two events in the men's category. This was Vaitkus's debut in the Winter Games. In the Men's downhill event, he finished 25th. The combined event consisted of two runs of slalom skiing, and a round of downhill skiing. He was not classified as a finisher in the event.

| Athlete | Event | Slalom | | Downhill | Total | |
| Athlete | Event | Time 1 | Time 2 | Time | Time | Rank |
|---|---|---|---|---|---|---|
| Linas Vaitkus | Men's downhill | — | | 1.56.22 | — | 25 |
| Linas Vaitkus | Men's combined | DNF | – | – | DNF | – |

== Biathlon ==
Biathlon competitions were held at Nozawa Onsen Resort. The biathlon events consisted of a skiing a specific course multiple times depending on the length of the competition, with intermediate shooting at various positions. For every shot missed, a penalty of one minute is applied in individual events, and the participant is required to ski through a penalty loop in sprint events. Liutauras Barila represented the nation in the event.

| Athlete | Event | Time | Misses ^{1} | Adjusted Time ^{2} | Rank |
|---|---|---|---|---|---|
| Liutauras Barila | Men's 10 km sprint | 31:23.7 | 5 | — | 59 |
| Liutauras Barila | Men's 20 km | 57.12.2 | 5 | 1:02.12.2 | 43 |

== Cross-country skiing ==
Cross-country skiing events were held at Birkebeineren Skistadion. Three athletes represented the nation, and competed in eight events. Ričardas Panavas achieved a best place finish of 30th in the men's 30 km freestyle event. Kazimiera Strolienė achieved a best place finish of 55th in the women's 30 km freestyle event.

| Athlete | Event | Time | Rank |
|---|---|---|---|
| Ričardas Panavas | Men's 10 km classical | 29.24.1 | 30 |
| Ričardas Panavas | Men's 15 km freestyle pursuit^{1} | 1:12.36.3 | 42 |
| Ričardas Panavas | Men's 30 km freestyle | 1:41.15.6 | 30 |
| Ričardas Panavas | Men's 50 km freestyle | DNF | – |
| Vladislavas Zybaila | Men's 10 km classical | 30.09.9 | 44 |
| Vladislavas Zybaila | Men's 15 km freestyle pursuit^{1} | 1:13.36,9 | 51 |
| Vladislavas Zybaila | Men's 30 km freestyle | DNF | – |
| Vladislavas Zybaila | Men's 50 km freestyle | 2:23.34,6 | 51 |
| Kazimiera Strolienė | Women's 5 km classical | 21.17.5 | 76 |
| Kazimiera Strolienė | Women's 10 km freestyle pursuit^{1} | 56.21.3 | 68 |
| Kazimiera Strolienė | Women's 15 km classical | 58.48,3 | 64 |
| Kazimiera Strolienė | Women's 30 km freestyle | 1:40.57,9 | 55 |

^{1} Starting delay based on 10 km results.

== Figure skating ==
Figure skating events were held at White Ring, Nagano. Margarita Drobiazko and Povilas Vanagas participated in the ice dancing event. This was the couple's third consecutive Olympic appearance. The couples were ranked in ordinal order individually by the judges. At the end of the competition, the ranks are tallied for each pair, and the final placement was based on the majority placement. The Lithuanian pair was ranked 8th in the competition.

| Athletes | Event | Compulsory Dance | | Original Dance | Free Dance | Total | Rank |
|---|---|---|---|---|---|---|---|
| Margarita Drobiazko; Povilas Vanagas | Ice dancing | 8 | 9 | 8 | 8 | 16.2 | 8 |
