= Lithuania at the 1992 Winter Olympics =

- IOC code: LTU (LIT used at these Games)
- NOC: Lithuanian National Olympic Committee
- Website: www.ltok.lt (in Lithuanian and English)

in Albertville
- Competitors: 6 (3 men, 3 women) in 3 sports
- Flag bearer: Gintaras Jasinskas (biathlon)
- Medals: Gold 0 Silver 0 Bronze 0 Total 0

Winter Olympics appearances (overview)
- 1928; 1932–1988; 1992; 1994; 1998; 2002; 2006; 2010; 2014; 2018; 2022; 2026

Other related appearances
- Soviet Union (1956–1988)

Lithuania participated at the 1992 Winter Olympics in Albertville, France, held between 8 and 23 February 1992. The country's participation in the Games marked its second appearance at the Winter Olympics after its debut in the 1928 Games. The Lithuanian team consisted of six athletes who competed in three sports. Gintaras Jasinskas served as the country's flag-bearer during the opening ceremony. Lithuania did not win any medal in the Games, and has not won a Winter Olympics medal previously.

== Background ==
The 1924 Summer Olympics marked Lithuania's first participation in the Olympic Games. The nation made its debut in the Winter Olympics at the 1928 Winter Olympics. The Lithuanian National Olympic Committee was recognized by the International Olympic Committee (IOC) in 1991. After its debut in 1928, the country did not participate in the Winter Games till the 1992 Games. The country's participation in the 1992 Games marked its second appearance at the Winter Olympics.

The 1992 Winter Olympics was held in Albertville, France, between 8 and 23 February 1992. The Lithuanian delegation consisted of six athletes. Gintaras Jasinskas served as the country's flag-bearer in the Parade of Nations during the opening ceremony. Lithuania did not win any medal in the Games, and has not won a Winter Olympics medal previously.

== Competitors ==
Lithuania sent a contingent of six athletes including three women who competed in three sports in a single sport at the Games.

Sport	Men	Women	Total
Biathlon	1	1	2
Cross-country skiing	1	1	2
Figure skating	1	1	2
Total	3	3	6

== Biathlon ==
Biathlon competitions were held at Les Saisies. The biathlon events consisted of a skiing a specific course multiple times depending on the length of the competition, with intermediate shooting at various positions. For every shot missed, a penalty of one minute is applied in individual events, and the participant is required to ski through a penalty loop in sprint events. Gintaras Jasinskas and Kazimiera Strolienė represented the nation in the event. This was the first Olympic appearance for Jasinskas and Strolienė.

Athlete	Event	Time	Misses ^{1}	Adjusted Time ^{2}	Rank
Gintaras Jasinskas	Men's 10 km sprint	29:44.3	2	—N/a	64
Gintaras Jasinskas	Men's 20 km	59:17.8	1	1'00:17.8	19
Kazimiera Strolienė	Women's 7.5 km sprint	27:16.7	4	—N/a	27
Kazimiera Strolienė	Women's 15 km	51:20.0	6	57:20.0	28

^{1} A penalty loop of 150 metres had to be skied per missed target.
^{2} One minute added per missed target.

== Cross-country skiing ==
Cross-country skiing events were held at Les Saisies. Ričardas Panavas and Vida Vencienė represented the nation, and competed in seven events. Panavas made his Olympic debut at the Games. Vencienė, who was born in Soviet Union, had represented Soviet Union in the 1988 Winter Olympics, before switching to Lithuania for the Games. She won two medals including a gold in the previous Olympics.

Panavas achieved a best place finish of 41st in the men's 30 km classical event. Vencienė achieved a best place finish of 11th in the women's 15 km classical event.

Athlete	Event	Time	Rank
Ričardas Panavas	Men's 10 km classical	31:48.9	54
Ričardas Panavas	Men's 15 km freestyle pursuit^{1}	44:54.5	50
Ričardas Panavas	Men's 30 km classical	1'30:38.0	41
Vida Venciene	Women's 5 km classical	15:08.7	19
Vida Venciene	Women's 10 km freestyle pursuit^{1}	29:19.1	28
Vida Venciene	Women's 15 km classical	45:12.9	11
Vida Venciene	Women's 30 km freestyle	1'29:45.4	16

^{1} Starting delay based on 10 km results.

== Figure skating ==
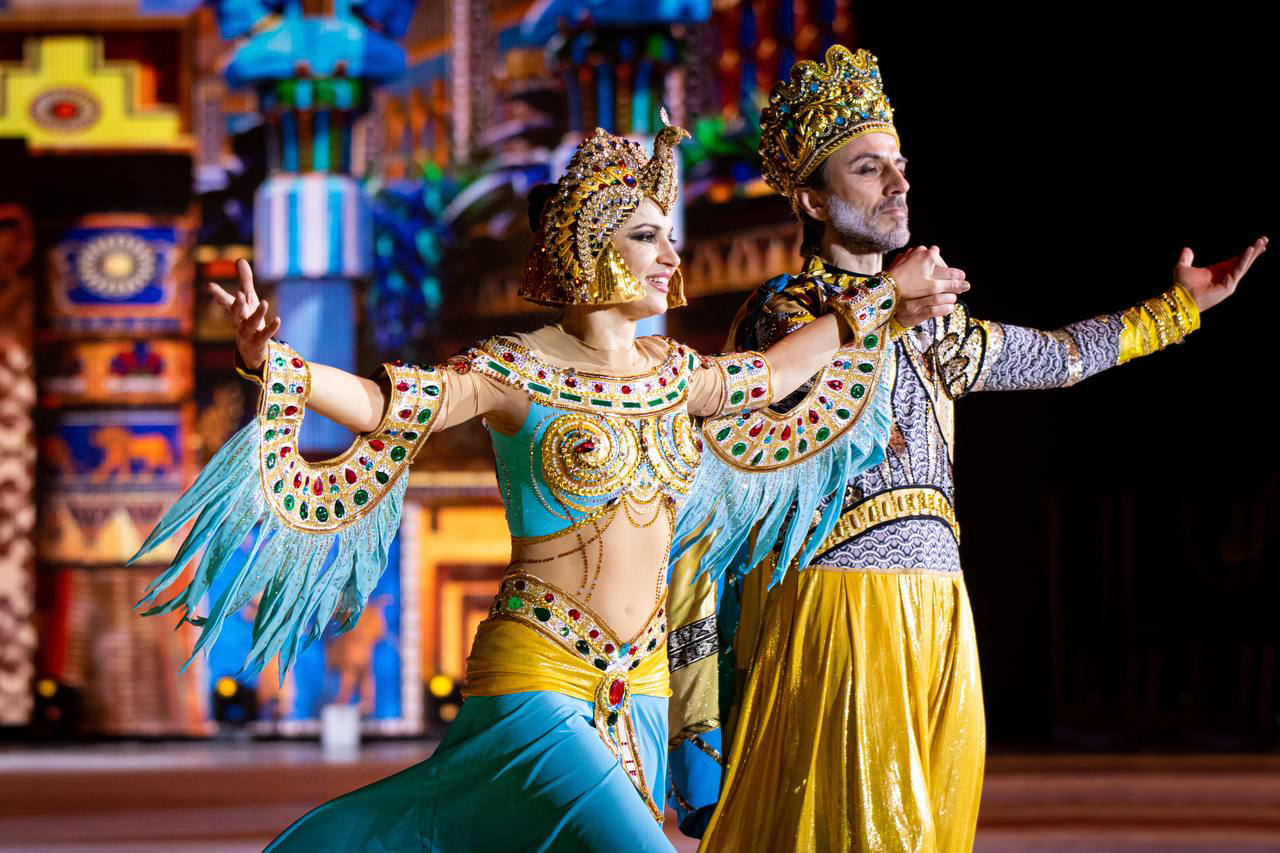
The pair of Margarita Drobiazko and Povilas Vanagas

Figure skating events were held at La Halle de Glace. Margarita Drobiazko and Povilas Vanagas participated in the ice dancing event. This was the couple's first Olympic appearance. They have taken part in the World and European figure skating championships. Drobiazko was born in Moscow in the Soviet Union, and switched allegiance to Lithuania. The couples were ranked in ordinal order individually by the judges. At the end of the competition, the ranks are tallied for each pair, and the final placement was based on the majority placement. The Lithuanian pair was ranked 16th in the competition.

Athletes	Event	Compulsory Dance		Original Dance	Free Dance	Total	Rank
Margarita Drobiazko; Povilas Vanagas	Ice dancing	17	17	17	16	33.0	16
