= Lithuania at the 1994 Winter Olympics =

- IOC code: LTU
- NOC: Lithuanian National Olympic Committee
- Website: www.ltok.lt (in Lithuanian and English)

in Lillehammer
- Competitors: 6 (3 men, 3 women) in 3 sports
- Flag bearer: Povilas Vanagas (figure skating)
- Medals: Gold 0 Silver 0 Bronze 0 Total 0

Winter Olympics appearances (overview)
- 1928; 1932–1988; 1992; 1994; 1998; 2002; 2006; 2010; 2014; 2018; 2022; 2026

Other related appearances
- Soviet Union (1956–1988)

Lithuania participated at the 1994 Winter Olympics in Lillehammer, Norway, held between 12 and 27 February 1994. The country's participation in the Games marked its third appearance at the Winter Olympics after its debut in the 1928 Games. The Lithuanian team consisted of six athletes who competed in three sports. Povilas Vanagas served as the country's flag-bearer during the opening ceremony. Lithuania did not win any medal in the Games, and has not won a Winter Olympics medal previously.

== Background ==
The 1924 Summer Olympics marked Lithuania's first participation in the Olympic Games. The nation made its debut in the Winter Olympics at the 1928 Winter Olympics. After its debut in 1928, the country did not participate in the Winter Games till the 1992 Games. The Lithuanian National Olympic Committee was recognized by the International Olympic Committee (IOC) in 1991. The country's participation in the 1994 Games marked its third appearance at the Winter Olympics.

The 1994 Winter Olympics was held in Lillehammer, Norway, between 12 and 27 February 1994. The Lithuanian delegation consisted of six athletes. Povilas Vanagas served as the country's flag-bearer in the Parade of Nations during the opening ceremony. Lithuania did not win any medal in the Games, and has not won a Winter Olympics medal previously.

== Competitors ==
Lithuania sent a contingent of six athletes including three women who competed in three sports at the Games. Lithuania sent the same contingent of six people who represented the nation in the previous Winter Games in 1992.

Sport	Men	Women	Total
Biathlon	1	1	2
Cross-country skiing	1	1	2
Figure skating	1	1	2
Total	3	3	6

== Biathlon ==
Biathlon competitions were held at Birkebeineren Skistadion, Lillehammer. The biathlon events consisted of a skiing a specific course multiple times depending on the length of the competition, with intermediate shooting at various positions. For every shot missed, a penalty of one minute is applied in individual events, and the participant is required to ski through a penalty loop in sprint events. Gintaras Jasinskas and Kazimiera Strolienė represented the nation in the event. This was a second Olympic appearance for Jasinskas. Strolienė, who made her debut at the previous Games, also represented the country for the second time at the Olympics.

In the men's sprint, Jasinskas was placed ninth after he completed the 10 km course with a time of 29 minutes and 35 seconds. In the subsequent men's individual event, he finished 58th amongst the 70 competitors, almost eight minutes behind the gold medal winner Sergey Tarasov of Russia. In the women's events, Stroliene similarly registered 48th and 62nd place finishes in the 7.5 km sprint and 15 km individual events.

Athlete	Event	Time	Misses ^{1}	Adjusted Time ^{2}	Rank
Gintaras Jasinskas	Men's 10 km sprint	29:35.8	0	—N/a	9
Gintaras Jasinskas	Men's 20 km	58:08.9	6	1'04:08.9	58
Kazimiera Strolienė	Women's 7.5 km sprint	29:16.6	4	—N/a	48
Kazimiera Strolienė	Men's 15 km	52:55.8	8	1'00:55.8	62

^{1} A penalty loop of 150 metres had to be skied per missed target.
^{2} One minute added per missed target.

== Cross-country skiing ==
Cross-country skiing events were held at Birkebeineren Skistadion. Ričardas Panavas and Vida Vencienė represented the nation, and competed in seven events. This was a second Olympic participation for Panavas. Vencienė, who was born in Soviet Union, had represented Soviet Union in the 1988 Winter Olympics, before switching to Lithuania for the 1992 Games. She won two medals including a gold in the previous Olympics. Panavas achieved a best place finish of 32nd in the men's 50 km freestyle event. Vencienė achieved a best place finish of 25th in the women's 30 km freestyle event.

Athlete	Event	Time	Rank
Ričardas Panavas	Men's 10 km classical	26:46.1	38
Ričardas Panavas	Men's 15 km freestyle pursuit^{1}	42:52.5	48
Ričardas Panavas	Men's 30 km freestyle	DNF	–
Ričardas Panavas	Men's 50 km classical	2'19:01.3	32
Vida Venciene	Women's 5 km classical	DNF	–
Vida Venciene	Women's 15 km freestyle	45:41.2	32
Vida Venciene	Women's 30 km classical	1'32:18.9	25

^{1} Starting delay based on 10 km results.

== Figure skating ==
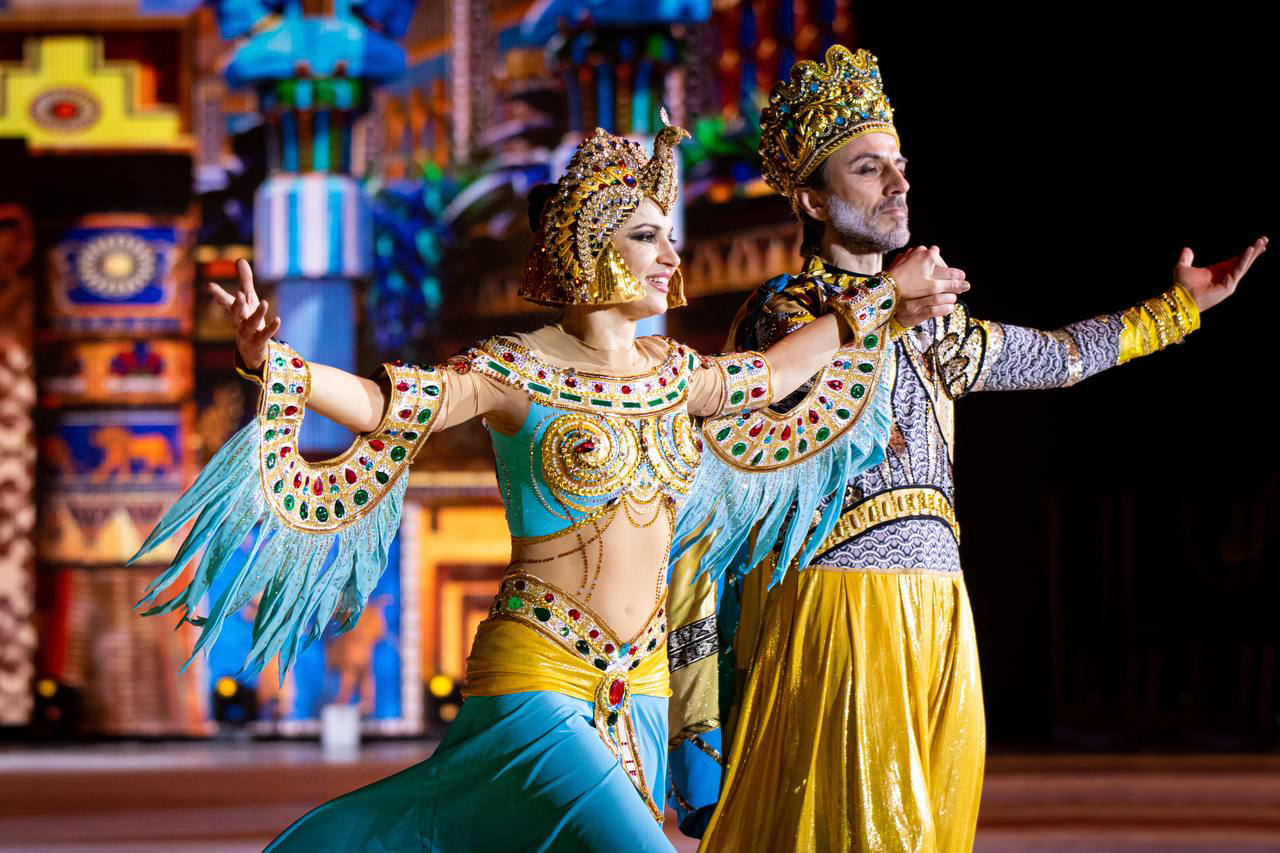
The pair of Margarita Drobiazko and Povilas Vanagas

Figure skating events were held at OL-Amfi, Hamar. Margarita Drobiazko and Povilas Vanagas participated in the ice dancing event. This was the couple's second Olympic appearance. They have taken part in the World and European figure skating championships. Drobiazko was born in Moscow in the Soviet Union, and switched allegiance to Lithuania. The couples were ranked in ordinal order individually by the judges. At the end of the competition, the ranks are tallied for each pair, and the final placement was based on the majority placement. The Lithuanian pair was ranked 12th in the competition.

Athletes	Event	Compulsory Dance		Original Dance	Free Dance	Total	Rank
Margarita Drobiazko; Povilas Vanagas	Ice dancing	13	13	12	12	24.4	12

== See also ==
- Lithuania at the 1994 Winter Paralympics
