= Kaukėnas =

Kaukėnas is a Lithuanian language surname. Notable people with the surname include:

- Rimantas Kaukėnas (born 1977), Lithuanian basketball player
- Tomas Kaukėnas (born 1990), Lithuanian biathlete
