= Lithuania at the 2010 Winter Olympics =

- IOC code: LTU
- NOC: Lithuanian National Olympic Committee
- Website: www.ltok.lt (in Lithuanian and English)

in Vancouver
- Competitors: 6 in 3 sports
- Flag bearers: Irina Terentjeva (opening); Mantas Strolia (closing)
- Medals: Gold 0 Silver 0 Bronze 0 Total 0

Winter Olympics appearances (overview)
- 1928; 1932–1988; 1992; 1994; 1998; 2002; 2006; 2010; 2014; 2018; 2022; 2026

Other related appearances
- Soviet Union (1956–1988)

Lithuania participated at the 2010 Winter Olympics in Vancouver, Canada held between 12 and 28 February 2010. The country's participation in the Games marked its seventh appearance at the Winter Olympics after its debut in the 1928 Games. The Lithuanian team consisted of six athletes who competed in three sports. Irina Terentjeva served as the country's flag-bearer during the opening ceremony and Mantas Strolia was the flag-bearer during the closing ceremony. Lithuania did not win any medal in the Games, and has not won a Winter Olympics medal previously.

== Background ==
The 1924 Summer Olympics marked Lithuania's first participation in the Olympic Games. The nation made its debut in the Winter Olympics at the 1928 Winter Olympics. After its debut in 1928, the country did not participate in the Winter Games till the 1992 Games. The Lithuanian National Olympic Committee was recognized by the International Olympic Committee (IOC) in 1991. The country's participation in the 2010 Games marked its seventh appearance at the Winter Olympics.

The 2010 Winter Olympics was held in Vancouver held between 12 and 28 February 2010. The Lithuanian delegation consisted of six athletes. Irina Terentjeva served as the country's flag-bearer during the opening ceremony and Mantas Strolia was the flag-bearer during the closing ceremony. Lithuania did not win any medal in the Games, and has not won a Winter Olympics medal previously.

== Competitors ==
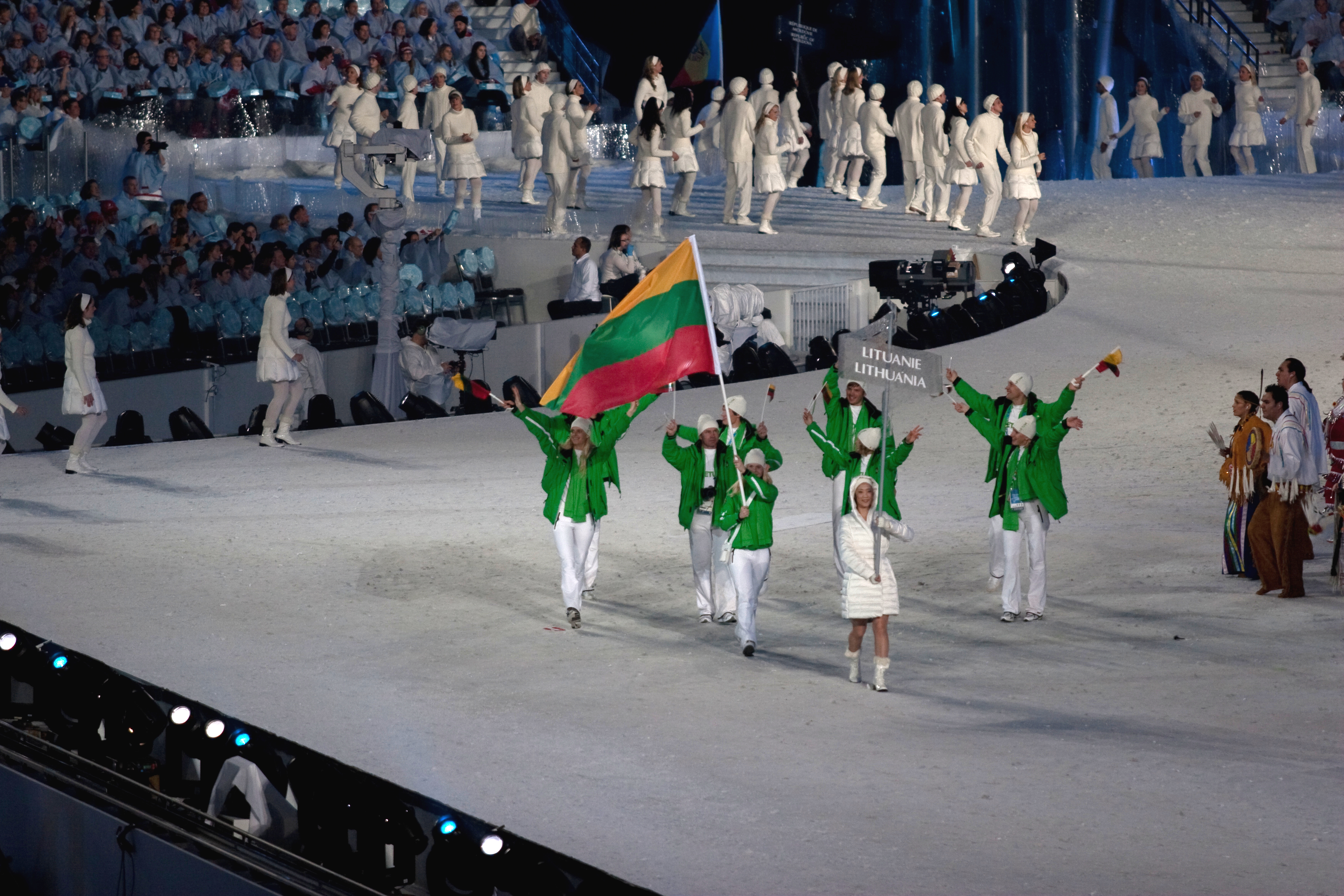
Lithuania during the Parade of Nations

Lithuania sent six athletes including two women who competed in three sports at the Games.

Sport	Men	Women	Total
Alpine skiing	1	0	1
Biathlon	0	1	1
Cross-country skiing	3	1	4
Total	4	2	6

Lithuania had qualified an entry in the ice dancing event for the figure skating event in lieu of the pair of Deividas Stagniūnas and Katherine Copely finishing 14th at the 2009 World Figure Skating Championships. However, as Copely had an American citizenship, she did not meet the criteria required to represent Lithuania in the Olympics. Her special request for citizenship was denied by Lithuanian president Dalia Grybauskaitė.

== Alpine skiing ==
The basic qualification mark for the alpine skiing events stipulated an average of less than 140 points in the list published by the International Ski Federation (FIS) as of 18 January 2010 for competitors ranked outside the top 100. The quotas were allocated further based on athletes satisfying other criteria, with a maximum of 22 athletes (maximum of 14 male or 14 female athletes) from a single participating NOC with not more than four participants in a single event. Vitalijus Rumiancevas achieved the basic qualification mark to qualify for the men's giant slalom and slalom events. Born in 1985, this was his second participation in the Winter Games.

The main event was held on 19 February 2010 at the Whistler Olympic Park. In the giant slalom event, Rumiancevas completed his first run in 1:27.27. He took slightly longer to complete the course in the second run at 1:29.52. With a combined time of 2:56.79, he finished 59th amongst 89 competitors in the overall classification. In the slalom event, he did not record a finish.

Athlete	Event	Run 1	Run 2	Total	Rank
Vitalijus Rumiancevas	Men's slalom	DNF			
Vitalijus Rumiancevas	Men's giant slalom	1:27.27	1:29.52	2:56.79	59

== Biathlon ==
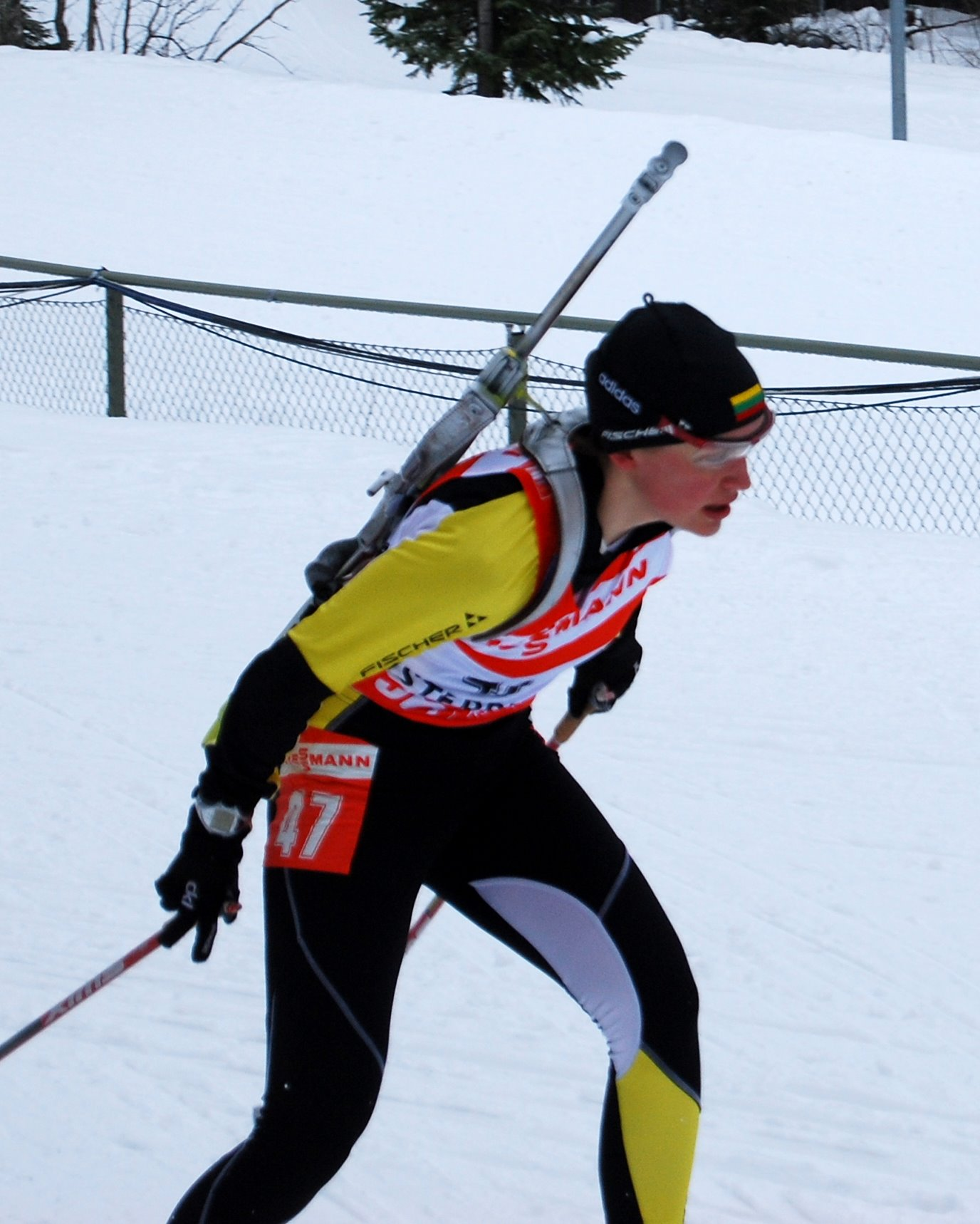
Diana Rasimovičiūtė was the lone Lithuanian competitor in biathlon

Biathlon competitions were held at the Whistler Olympic Park from 13 to 26 February. Two our Moldovan athletes participated across six events in biathlon. The biathlon events consisted of a skiing a specific course multiple times depending on the length of the competition, with intermediate shooting at various positions. For every shot missed, a penalty of one minute is applied in individual events, and the participant is required to ski through a penalty loop in sprint events.

In the women's events, Diana Rasimovičiūtė represented the country in all three of the women's individual medal events. It was her third consecutive Winter Games appearance. In the medal events, Levtchenkova registered her best finish in the women's sprint event, finishing 25th amongst the 88 participants.

Athlete	Event	Final		
Athlete	Event	Time	Misses	Rank
Diana Rasimovičiūtė	Women's sprint	21:11.2	2 (1+1)	25
Diana Rasimovičiūtė	Women's pursuit	33:58.4	5 (0+0+3+2)	34
Diana Rasimovičiūtė	Women's individual	44:13.2	3 (1+0+1+1)	30

== Cross-country skiing ==
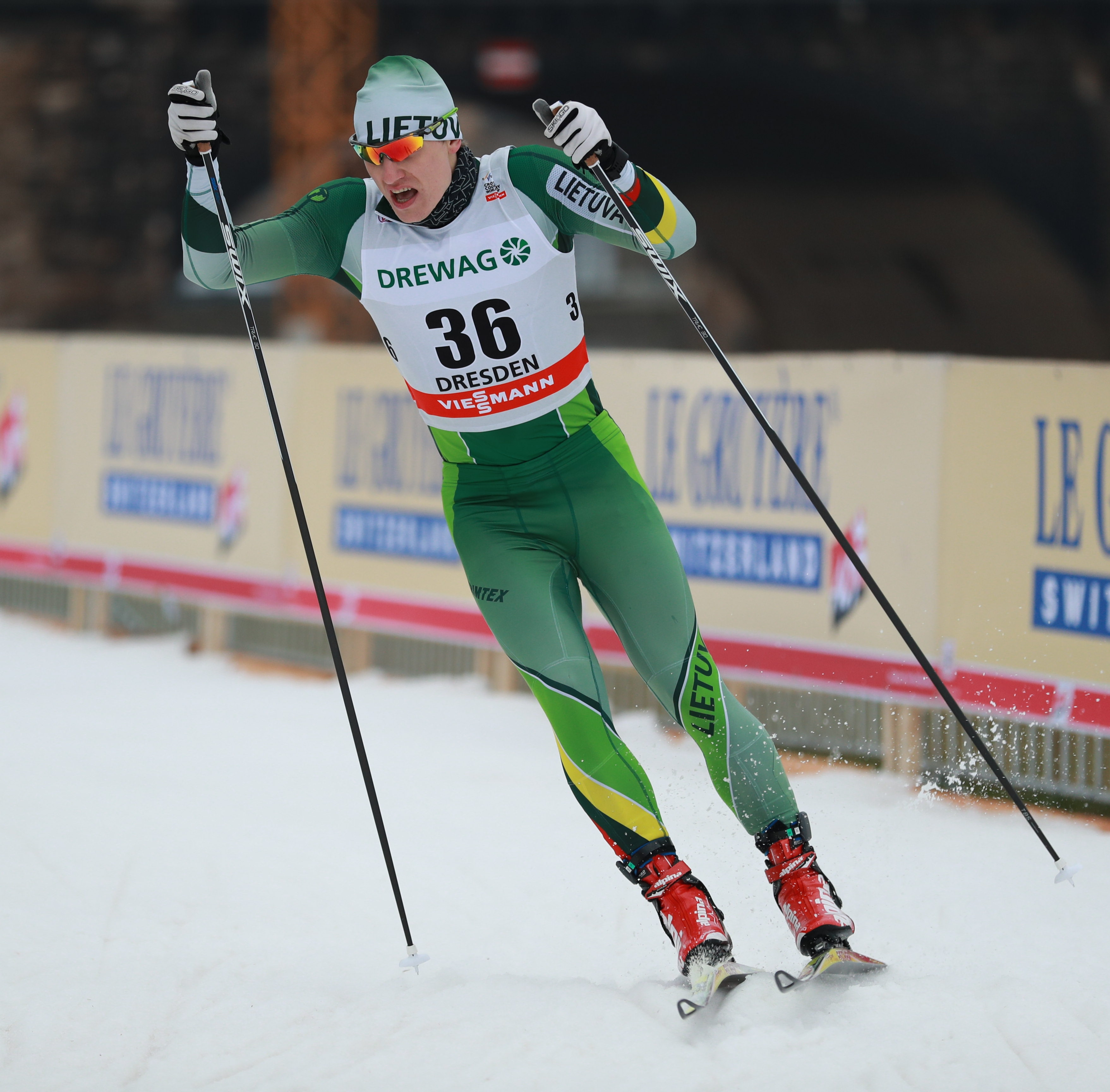
Modestas Vaičiulis participated in two events in cross-country skiing

For the cross-country skiing event, athletes with a maximum of 300 distance points at the end of qualifying on 18 January 2010 were allowed to compete in the freestyle distance event. After a maximum quota of 20 athletes (maximum of 12 male or 12 female athletes) from a single participating NOC was reached, the remaining quotas were allocated further to athletes satisfying standard criteria from other NOCs. While Irina Terentjeva represented the nation in the women's events, three men competed in the men's events. This was Terentjeva's third consecutive Winter Games appearance. Amongst the men's participants, only Aleksei Novoselski had previously competed in the Olympics.

The main event was held at the Whistler Olympic Park. In the men's freestyle event, Novoselskicompleted the 15 km (9.3 mi) course in just over 38 minutes. He finished the race in 71st position (out of 96 competitors), more than four minutes behind the winner Dario Cologna of Switzerland. In the men's sprint events, Mantas Strolia was the best placed Lithuanian in 46th place. In the women's freestyle event, Terentjeva finished 64th amongst the 78 competitors.

Athlete	Event	Final	
Athlete	Event	Total	Rank
Aleksei Novoselski	Men's 15 kilometre freestyle	38:01.6	71
Aleksei Novoselski	Men's sprint	3:51.70	53
Mantas Strolia	Men's sprint	3:47.17	46
Modestas Vaičiulis	Men's sprint	3:52.10	54
Modestas Vaičiulis; Mantas Strolia	Men's sprint	19:43.1	18
Irina Terentjeva	Women's 10 kilometre freestyle	28:52.2	64
Irina Terentjeva	Women's sprint	4:04.47	49
