= Lithuania at the 1928 Winter Olympics =

- IOC code: LTU
- NOC: Lithuanian National Olympic Committee
- Website: www.ltok.lt (in Lithuanian and English)

in St. Moritz
- Competitors: Kęstutis Bulota in 1 sport
- Flag bearer: Kęstutis Bulota
- Medals: Gold 0 Silver 0 Bronze 0 Total 0

Winter Olympics appearances (overview)
- 1928; 1932–1988; 1992; 1994; 1998; 2002; 2006; 2010; 2014; 2018; 2022; 2026

Other related appearances
- Soviet Union (1956–1988)

Lithuania participated at the 1928 Winter Olympics in St. Moritz, Switzerland, held between 11 and 19 February 1928. The country's participation in the Games marked its debut at the Winter Olympics. The Lithuanian team consisted of a lone athlete Kęstutis Bulota who competed across four events in speed skating. Bulota also served as the country's flag-bearer during the opening ceremony. Lithuania did not win any medal in the Games.

== Background ==
The 1924 Summer Olympics marked Lithuania's first participation in the Olympic Games. The nation made its debut in the Winter Olympics at the 1928 Games. This would be the country's last participation in the Winter Games before 1992 after its independence from the Soviet Union. The Lithuanian National Olympic Committee would be recognized by the International Olympic Committee (IOC) only in 1991.

The 1928 Winter Olympics was held in St. Moritz, Switzerland, between 11 and 19 February 1928. The Lithuanian delegation consisted of a lone athlete Kęstutis Bulota. Bulota also served as the country's flag-bearer in the Parade of Nations during the opening ceremony. Lithuania did not win any medal in the Games.

== Competitors ==
Lithuania sent a single athlete who competed in four events in a single sport at the Games.

Sport	Men	Women	Athletes
Speed skating	1	0	1
Total	1	0	1

== Speed skating ==
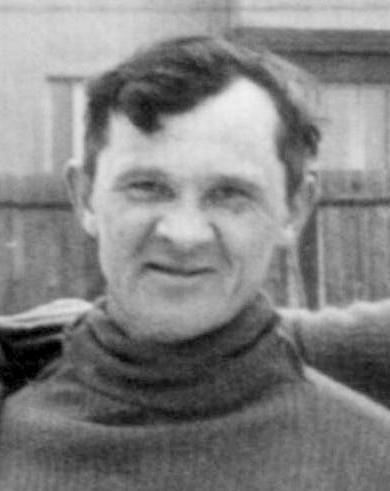
Kęstutis Bulota was the country's lone representative at the Games

Speed skating competitions were held on 13 and 14 February at the Olympia-Eisstadion Badrutts Park in St. Moritz. Kęstutis Bulota participated in four events in the competition.

Bulota was born in 1896 in Tallinn in neighboring Estonia. He was Lithuania's first representative at the Winter Olympics, and the nation's only representative in speed skating at the Games. He finished 21st in the 1928 World Championships held a week prior to the Games in Davos. Bulota competed in multiple sports in his native Lithuania. He was one of the founders of club LFLS Kaunas. He won the national football title in 1922 and 1923, and national ice hockey title in 1926 with the club. He was also a medalist in track cycling and various athletic events such as the relay, high jump and hammer throw.

In the 500 m and 1500 m events, Bulota was placed joint 28th and 25th respectively. In the 5000 m, despite the weather getting worse as the competition progressed, Bulota, who started earlier in the fourth race, ended in 25th place amongst the 32 competitors. In the 10000 m race, Bulota completed the run as a part of the second pair, and was ranked fifth in the initial standings. However, as the weather became prohibitive as the session progressed, the results were annulled and no medals were awarded.

Athlete	Event	Time	Rank
Kęstutis Bulota	Men's 500 m	50.1	=28
Kęstutis Bulota	Men's 1,500 m	2:40.9	25
Kęstutis Bulota	Men's 5,000 m	9:49.8	25
Kęstutis Bulota	Men's 10,000 m	20:22.2	AF
