= Vytautas Strolia =

Lithuanian cross-country skier and biathlete (born 1992)

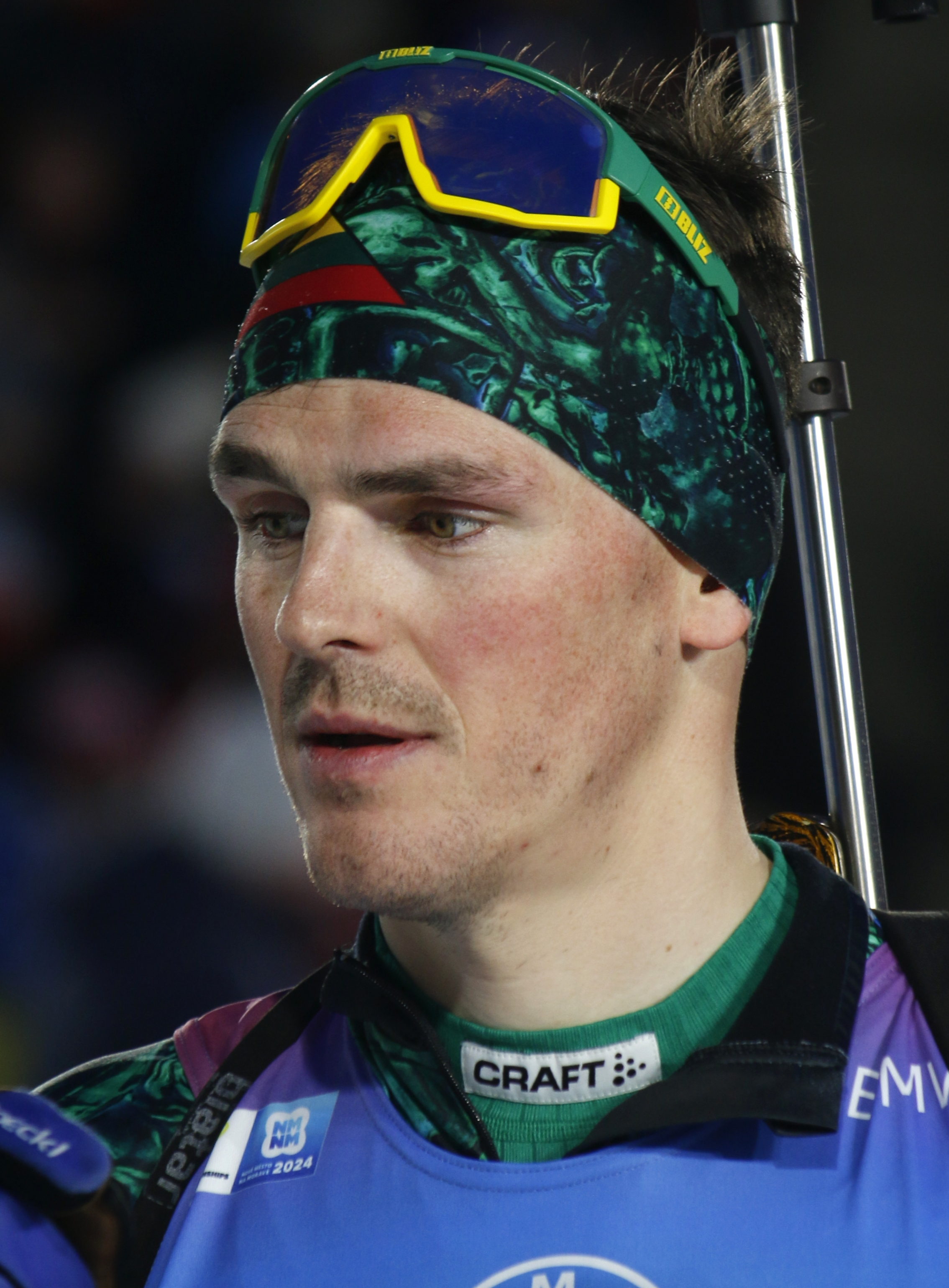
- Strolia in 2024

Personal information
- Born: November 28, 1992 (age 33) Anykščiai, Lithuania

Sport
- Club: Anykščiai "Viesulas"

Vytautas Strolia (born 28 November 1992 in Anykščiai, Lithuania) is a Lithuanian athlete. He competes in cross-country skiing and biathlon events. He competed at multiple FIS Nordic World Ski Championships and Biathlon World Cups. He had represented Lithuania in three Winter Olympics Games in 2014, 2018, and 2022.

== Early career ==
Vytautas Strolia was born 28 November 1992 in Anykščiai, Lithuania.

== Career ==
Strolia started competing in Nordic Junior World Ski Championships in 2009. He made his debut at the Nordic World Ski Championships at Oslo in 2011. He further took part in the Junior World Ski Championships in 2012 and the World Ski Championships in 2013. He started competing in the Biathlon World Cup events in 2014. Strolia was named to the Lithuanian team for the 2014 Winter Olympics held at Sochi. This was his debut at the Winter Olympics. He competed in two cross-country events at the competition. He finished in 67th and 70th place in the men's 30 km skiathlon and 15 km classical events respectively.

In 2018, Strolia was named to the Lithuanian team for the 2018 Winter Olympics. This was his second consecutive appearance at the Winter Olympics. Strolia competed in three individual biathlon events in the Games. He registered the best finish of 43rd amongst the 60 competitors in the men's pursuit event. He was part of the Lithuanian team for the 2022 Winter Olympics. This was his third and last appearance at the Winter Olympics. He competed in three events at the Games. He finished 43rd, 21st and 58th in the sprint, individual and pursuit events respectively.

== Biathlon results ==
All results are sourced from the International Biathlon Union.

=== Olympic Games ===
0 medals

Event	Individual	Sprint	Pursuit	Mass start	Relay	Mixed relay
(South Korea) 2018 Pyeongchang	82nd	49th	43rd	—	—	19th
(China) 2022 Beijing	21st	43rd	58th	—	14th	—
(Italy) 2026 Milano-Cortina	19th	49th	39th	—	15th	20th

=== World Championships ===
0 medals

Event	Individual	Sprint	Pursuit	Mass start	Relay	Mixed relay	Single Mixed relay
(Finland) 2015 Kontiolahti	66th	69th	—N/a	—N/a	23rd	—N/a	—N/a
(Norway) 2016 Oslo	87th	87th	—N/a	—N/a	23rd	23rd	—N/a
(Austria) 2017 Hochfilzen	73rd	54th	56th	—N/a	25th	24th	—N/a
(Sweden) 2019 Östersund	61st	26th	DSQ	—N/a	21st	—N/a	—N/a
(Italy) 2020 Antholz-Anterselva	55th	28th	31st	—N/a	24th	16th	—N/a
(Slovenia) 2021 Pokljuka	65th	62nd	—N/a	—N/a	25th	17th	—N/a
(Germany) 2023 Oberhof	44th	42nd	49th	—N/a	16th	18th	—N/a
(Czech Republic) 2024 Nové Město na Moravě	15th	56th	DNS	—N/a	20th	17th	24th
(Switzerland) 2025 Lenzerheide	72nd	28th	34th	—N/a	18th	16th	—N/a

*During Olympic seasons competitions are only held for those events not included in the Olympic program.
**The single mixed relay was added as an event in 2019.
