= Lithuania at the 2014 Winter Olympics =

- IOC code: LTU
- NOC: Lithuanian National Olympic Committee
- Website: www.ltok.lt (in Lithuanian and English)

in Sochi
- Competitors: 9 in 5 sports
- Flag bearers: Deividas Stagniūnas (opening); Agnė Sereikaitė (closing)
- Medals: Gold 0 Silver 0 Bronze 0 Total 0

Winter Olympics appearances (overview)
- 1928; 1932–1988; 1992; 1994; 1998; 2002; 2006; 2010; 2014; 2018; 2022; 2026

Other related appearances
- Soviet Union (1956–1988)

Lithuania competed at the 2014 Winter Olympics in Sochi, Russia from 7 to 23 February 2014. The team consists of nine athletes competing in five different sports. The nine athletes mark the most athletes the country has ever qualified for a Winter Olympics.

On 19 December 2013 in Brussels, Belgium Lithuanian president Dalia Grybauskaitė stated that she won't go to the Games due to Russia's politics and said "Amid the current situation where I see human rights violations, as well as an attitude towards and treatment of Eastern Partners, including Lithuania, and the economic sanctions that have been applied against Lithuania, I do not see a political possibility of going to the Sochi Games".

== Alpine skiing ==
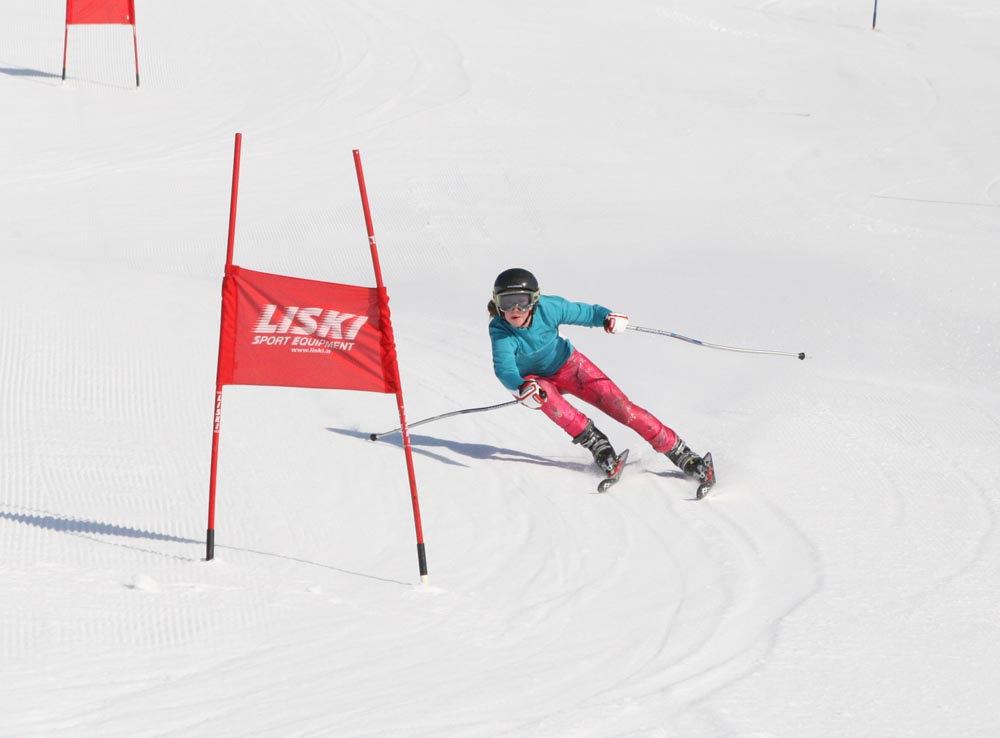
Ieva Januškevičiūtė (shown racing here in 2009) raced the giant slalom and slalom races.

According to the final quota allocation released on January 20, 2014, Lithuania has two athletes in qualification positions.

Athlete	Event	Run 1		Run 2		Total	
Athlete	Event	Time	Rank	Time	Rank	Time	Rank
Rokas Zaveckas	Men's giant slalom	1:36.06	70	1:36.98	62	3:13.04	63
Rokas Zaveckas	Men's slalom	DNF					
Ieva Januškevičiūtė	Women's giant slalom	1:36.79	71	DNF			
Ieva Januškevičiūtė	Women's slalom	DNF					

== Biathlon ==
Based on their performance at the 2012 and 2013 Biathlon World Championships Lithuania qualified 1 man and 1 woman.

Athlete	Event	Time	Misses	Rank
Tomas Kaukėnas	Men's sprint	26:26.2	2 (0+2)	48
Tomas Kaukėnas	Men's pursuit	36:49.8	3 (1+0+0+2)	40
Tomas Kaukėnas	Men's individual	52.38.9	3 (0+0+0+3)	23
Diana Rasimovičiūtė	Women's sprint	23:18.6	2 (1+1)	51
Diana Rasimovičiūtė	Women's pursuit	34:07.1	2 (0+0+0+2)	43
Diana Rasimovičiūtė	Women's individual	49:32.5	2 (1+1+0+0)	42

== Cross-country skiing ==
According to the final quota allocation released on January 20, 2014, Lithuania has two athletes in qualification position.

Distance

Athlete	Event	Classical		Freestyle		Final		
Athlete	Event	Time	Rank	Time	Rank	Time	Deficit	Rank
Vytautas Strolia	Men's 15 km classical	—				45:08.0	+6:38.3	70
Vytautas Strolia	Men's 30 km skiathlon	40:54.7	65	39:03.4	67	1:20:37.2	+12.21.8	67
Ingrida Ardišauskaitė	Women's 10 km classical	—				36:52.1	+8:34.3	64

Sprint

Athlete	Event	Qualification		Quarterfinal		Semifinal		Final	
Athlete	Event	Time	Rank	Time	Rank	Time	Rank	Time	Rank
Vytautas Strolia	Men's sprint	3:55.48	70	Did not advance					
Ingrida Ardišauskaitė	Women's sprint	2:55.24	62	Did not advance					

== Figure skating ==
The Lithuanian president Dalia Grybauskaitė had initially refused to give citizenship to ice dancer Deividas Stagniūnas' partner Isabella Tobias. This would be second time that Stagniūnas would be unable to participate in the Olympics because of his partner's citizenship requests, hadn't president decided to give citizenship to Tobias on 2 December 2013. In 2013 World championships Tobias and Stagniūnas qualified for the Olympics.

Athlete	Event	SP/OD		FS/FD		Total	
Athlete	Event	Points	Rank	Points	Rank	Points	Rank
Isabella Tobias / Deividas Stagniūnas	Ice dancing	56.40	17 Q	82.60	18	139.00	17

== Short track speed skating ==
Lithuania qualified 1 female athlete for the Olympics during World Cup 3 & 4 in November 2013. This will mark Lithuania's debut in the sport.

Women

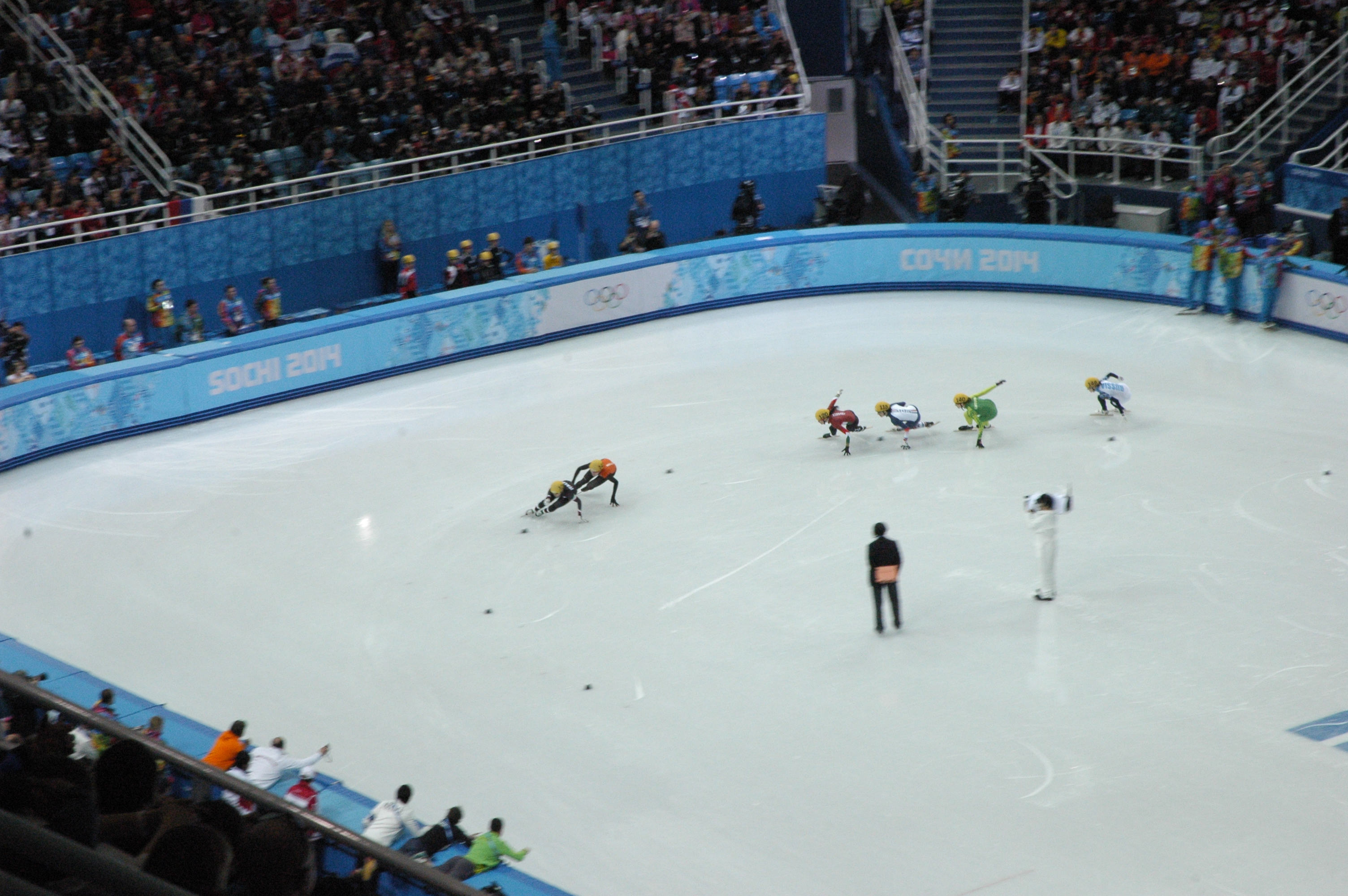
Agnė Sereikaitė in the women's 1500m semifinal

Athlete	Event	Heat		Quarterfinal		Semifinal		Final	
Athlete	Event	Time	Rank	Time	Rank	Time	Rank	Time	Rank
Agnė Sereikaitė	500 m	45.356	3	Did not advance					24
Agnė Sereikaitė	1000 m	PEN		Did not advance					
Agnė Sereikaitė	1500 m	2:21.900	3 Q	—		2:20.398	6	Did not advance	16

Qualification legend: Q – Qualified for next round ADV – Advanced due to being impeded by another skater; FA – Qualify to medal round; FB – Qualify to consolation round

== See also ==
- Lithuania at the 2014 Summer Youth Olympics
