= Lithuania at the 2002 Winter Olympics =

- IOC code: LTU
- NOC: Lithuanian National Olympic Committee
- Website: www.ltok.lt (in Lithuanian and English)

in Salt Lake City
- Competitors: 8 in 3 sports
- Flag bearer: Ričardas Panavas
- Medals: Gold 0 Silver 0 Bronze 0 Total 0

Winter Olympics appearances (overview)
- 1928; 1932–1988; 1992; 1994; 1998; 2002; 2006; 2010; 2014; 2018; 2022; 2026; 2030

Other related appearances
- Soviet Union (1956–1988)

Lithuania was represented at the 2002 Winter Olympics in Salt Lake City, Utah, United States by the Lithuanian National Olympic Committee.

In total, eight athletes including five men and three women represented Lithuania in three different sports including biathlon, cross-country skiing and figure skating. No athletes won medals but one top-five finish was achieved.

== Biathlon ==
Two Lithuanian athletes participated in the biathlon events – Liutauras Barila and Diana Rasimovičiūtė.

The men's individual took place on 11 February 2002. Barila completed the course in 55 minutes 2.3 seconds but with four shooting misses for an adjusted time of 59 minutes 2.3 seconds to finish 62nd overall.

The men's sprint took place on 13 February 2002. Barila completed the course in 30 minutes 1.4 seconds with five shooting misses to finish 82nd overall.

The women's sprint also took place on 13 February 2002. Rasimovičiūtė completed the course in 25 minutes 41.4 seconds with three shooting misses to finish 66th overall.

Men

| Event | Athlete | Misses | Time | Rank |
|---|---|---|---|---|
| 10 km Sprint | Liutauras Barila | 5 | 30:01.4 | 82 |

| Event | Athlete | Time | Misses | Rank |
|---|---|---|---|---|
| 20 km | Liutauras Barila | 59:02.3 | 4 | 62 |

Women

| Event | Athlete | Misses | Time | Rank |
|---|---|---|---|---|
| 7.5 km Sprint | Diana Rasimovičiūtė | 3 | 25:41.4 | 66 |

== Cross-country skiing ==
Four Lithuanian athletes participated in the biathlon events – Vadim Gusevas, Ričardas Panavas, Irina Terentjeva and Vladislavas Zybaila.

The men's 30 km freestyle mass start took place on 9 February 2002. Gusevas completed the course in one hour 24 minutes 26.3 seconds to finish 63rd overall. Zybaila completed the course in one hour 21 minutes 27.1 seconds to finish 57th overall.

The women's 15 km freestyle mass start also took place on 9 February 2002. Terentjeva completed the course in 45 minutes 45.4 seconds to finish 48th overall.

The men's 15 km classical took place on 12 February 2002. Gusevas completed the course in 43 minutes 56.2 seconds to finish 59th overall. Panavas completed the course in 40 minutes 31 seconds to finish 39th overall. Zybaila completed the course in 42 minutes 7.9 seconds to finish 52nd overall.

The men's 2 x 10 km pursuit took place on 14 February 2002. Panavas completed the combined course in 52 minutes 47.1 seconds to finish 47th overall. Gusevas and Zybaila were lapped and finished 63rd and 58th respectively.

The women's 2 x 5 km pursuit took place on 15 February 2002. Terentjeva completed the 5 km classical but did not advance to the 5 km classical and finished 63rd overall.

The men's sprint took place on 19 February 2002. Gusevas and Zybaila completed the qualifying round in the same time – three minutes 7.25 seconds. They did not advance to the quarter-finals and finished joint 52nd overall.

The women's sprint also took place on 19 February 2002. Terentjeva completed the qualifying round in three minutes 34.18 seconds. She did not advance to the quarter-finals and finished joint 48th overall.

The men's 50 km classical took place on 23 February 2002. Gusevas completed the course in two hours 45 minutes 23 seconds to finish 55th overall. Panavas completed the course in two hours 23 minutes 56.4 seconds to finish 43rd overall. Zybaila completed the course in two hours 29 minutes 27.4 seconds to finish 50th overall.

| Athlete | Event | Race | |
| Athlete | Event | Time | Rank |
|---|---|---|---|
| Vadim Gusevas | sprint | DNQ, qualification.:3:07.25 | 52nd |
| Vadim Gusevas | 15 km classical | 43:56.2 (+6:48.8) | 59th |
| Vadim Gusevas | 30 km freestyle | 1:24:26.3 (+12:55.3) | 63rd |
| Vadim Gusevas | 50 km classical | 2:45:23.0 (+39:02.2) | 55th |
| Vadim Gusevas | 20 km combined | 29:57.7 + not placed | 63rd |
| Ričardas Panavas | 15 km classical | 40:31.0 (+3:23.6) | 39th |
| Ričardas Panavas | 50 km classical | 2:23:56.4 (+17:35.6) | 43rd |
| Ričardas Panavas | 20 km combined | 27:51.9 + 24:56.1 | 47th |
| Vladislavas Zybaila | sprint | DNQ, qualification: 29:57.7 (+17.18) | 52nd |
| Vladislavas Zybaila | 15 km classical | 42:07.9 (+5.00,5) | 52nd |
| Vladislavas Zybaila | 30 km freestyle | 1:21:27.1 (+9.56,1) | 57th |
| Vladislavas Zybaila | 50 km classical | 2:29:27.4 (+23.06,6) | 50th |
| Vladislavas Zybaila | 20 km combined | 29:08.1 + not placed | 58th |
| Irina Terentjeva | sprint | DNQ, qualification: 3:34.18 (+21.42) | 48th |
| Irina Terentjeva | 15 km freestyle | 45:45.4 (+5:51.0) | 48th |
| Irina Terentjeva | 10 km combined | 15:13.5 + not placed | 63rd |

== Figure skating ==
Two Lithuanian athletes participated in the figure skating events – Margarita Drobiazko and Povilas Vanagas.

The ice dance took place on 15, 17 and 18 February 2002. Drobiazko and Vanagas finished fifth overall.

Ice Dancing

| Athletes | CD1 | CD2 | OD | FD | TFP | Rank |
|---|---|---|---|---|---|---|
| Margarita Drobiazko; Povilas Vanagas | 5 | 5 | 5 | 5 | 10.0 | 5 |
