= Lithuania at the Olympics =

- IOC code: LTU
- NOC: Lithuanian National Olympic Committee
- Website: www.ltok.lt (in Lithuanian and English)
- Medals Ranked 69th: Gold 6 Silver 9 Bronze 15 Total 30

Summer appearances
- 1924; 1928; 1932–1988; 1992; 1996; 2000; 2004; 2008; 2012; 2016; 2020; 2024; 2028

Winter appearances
- 1928; 1932–1988; 1992; 1994; 1998; 2002; 2006; 2010; 2014; 2018; 2022; 2026

Other related appearances
- Russian Empire (1908–1912); Soviet Union (1952–1988)

Lithuania, after declaring restoration of independence in 1918, sent its athletes to the 1924 Summer Olympics in Paris for the first time. At first it was considered to send 33 athletes, but then it was decided to limit the delegation to 13 soccer players and 2 cyclists. The soccer players arrived in Paris only a day before the game was scheduled. Lithuania debuted at the Olympic Games on May 25, 1924, at 2:40pm (Paris time) when the match between Lithuanian and Swiss teams started. Lithuania lost 9-0 (4-0). The cyclists could not finish the 188 km race because of technical difficulties.

In 1928 Summer Olympics Lithuania had 12 representatives for 4 sports: 2 boxers, 4 cyclists, and 5 athletics and one weightlifter. Juozas Vinča achieved the best results and took 5-7 place in boxing.

In 1932 Summer Olympics in Los Angeles, Lithuania did not participate due to economic difficulties and political controversies surrounding the National Olympic Committee. In 1936 Summer Olympics in Berlin, Lithuania was not invited by Germany due to German territorial claims over Klaipėda region and Trial of Neumann and Sass. In 1940, Lithuania was occupied by the Soviet Union. After the Second World War, Lithuanians participated in the Olympic Games with the Soviet Union team. From 1948 to 1988, 86 Lithuanians participated in the Olympics and won 60 medals (57 in Summer and three in Winter Olympics).

Since the restoration of its independence in 1990, Lithuania has not missed any Olympic Games.

Lithuania has never won a medal at the Winter Olympics.

== Medal tables ==
=== Medals by Summer Games ===
Games	Athletes	Gold	Silver	Bronze	Total	Rank
1900–1912	as part of the Russian Empire					
(Belgium) 1920 Antwerp	did not participate					
(France) 1924 Paris	13	0	0	0	0	–
(Netherlands) 1928 Amsterdam	12	0	0	0	0	–
1932–1936	did not participate					
1948–1988	occupied by the Soviet Union					
(Spain) 1992 Barcelona	47	1	0	1	2	34
(United States) 1996 Atlanta	61	0	0	1	1	71
(Australia) 2000 Sydney	61	2	0	3	5	33
(Greece) 2004 Athens	59	1	2	0	3	45
(China) 2008 Beijing	71	0	3	2	5	56
(United Kingdom) 2012 London	62	2	0	3	5	33
(Brazil) 2016 Rio de Janeiro	67	0	1	3	4	64
(Japan) 2020 Tokyo	42	0	1	0	1	77
(France) 2024 Paris	51	0	2	2	4	70
(United States) 2028 Los Angeles	future event					
(Australia) 2032 Brisbane	future event					
Total		6	9	15	30	69

=== Medals by Winter Games ===
Games	Athletes	Gold	Silver	Bronze	Total	Rank
(Switzerland) 1928 St. Moritz	1	0	0	0	0	–
1932–1936	did not participate					
1948–1988	occupied by the Soviet Union					
(France) 1992 Albertville	6	0	0	0	0	–
(Norway) 1994 Lillehammer	6	0	0	0	0	–
(Japan) 1998 Nagano	7	0	0	0	0	–
(United States) 2002 Salt Lake City	8	0	0	0	0	–
(Italy) 2006 Turin	7	0	0	0	0	–
(Canada) 2010 Vancouver	6	0	0	0	0	–
(Russia) 2014 Sochi	9	0	0	0	0	–
(South Korea) 2018 Pyeongchang	9	0	0	0	0	–
(China) 2022 Beijing	13	0	0	0	0	–
(Italy) 2026 Milano Cortina	17	0	0	0	0	–
(France) 2030 French Alps	future event					
(United States) 2034 Utah	future event					
Total		0	0	0	0	–

=== Medals by summer sport ===
Sport	Gold	Silver	Bronze	Total
Athletics	3	2	2	7
Modern pentathlon	1	3	1	5
Shooting	1	0	0	1
Swimming	1	0	0	1
Rowing	0	1	3	4
Wrestling	0	1	1	2
Breaking	0	1	0	1
Sailing	0	1	0	1
Basketball	0	0	3	3
3x3 basketball	0	0	1	1
Boxing	0	0	1	1
Canoeing	0	0	1	1
Cycling	0	0	1	1
Weightlifting	0	0	1	1
Totals (14 entries)	6	9	15	30

== List of medalists ==
=== Summer Olympics ===
Medal	Name	Games	Sport	Event
Gold	Romas Ubartas	1992 Barcelona	Athletics	Men's discus throw
Bronze	Men's basketball team Romanas Brazdauskis; Valdemaras Chomičius; Darius Dimavičius; Gintaras Einikis; Sergejus Jovaiša; Artūras Karnišovas; Gintaras Krapikas; Rimas Kurtinaitis; Šarūnas Marčiulionis; Alvydas Pazdrazdis; Arvydas Sabonis; Arūnas Visockas	1992 Barcelona	Basketball	Men's Team Competition
Bronze	Men's basketball team Arvydas Sabonis; Šarūnas Marčiulionis; Rimas Kurtinaitis; Gintaras Einikis; Artūras Karnišovas; Darius Lukminas; Saulius Štombergas; Eurelijus Žukauskas; Mindaugas Žukauskas; Andrius Jurkūnas; Rytis Vaišvila; Tomas Pačėsas	1996 Atlanta	Basketball	Men's Team Competition
Gold	Virgilijus Alekna	2000 Sydney	Athletics	Men's discus throw
Gold	Daina Gudzinevičiūtė	2000 Sydney	Shooting	Women's Trap Shooting
Bronze	Men's basketball team Saulius Štombergas; Mindaugas Timinskas; Eurelijus Žukauskas; Darius Maskoliūnas; Ramūnas Šiškauskas; Darius Songaila; Šarūnas Jasikevičius; Kęstutis Marčiulionis; Tomas Masiulis; Dainius Adomaitis; Gintaras Einikis; Andrius Giedraitis	2000 Sydney	Basketball	Men's Team Competition
Bronze	Diana Žiliūtė	2000 Sydney	Cycling	Women's Individual Road Race
Bronze	Kristina Poplavskaja; Birutė Šakickienė	2000 Sydney	Rowing	Women's Double Sculls
Gold	Virgilijus Alekna	2004 Athens	Athletics	Men's discus throw
Silver	Austra Skujytė	2004 Athens	Athletics	Women's heptathlon
Silver	Andrejus Zadneprovskis	2004 Athens	Modern pentathlon	Men's event
Silver	Edvinas Krungolcas	2008 Beijing	Modern pentathlon	Men's event
Silver	Gintarė Volungevičiūtė	2008 Beijing	Sailing	Women's Laser Radial
Silver	Mindaugas Mizgaitis	2008 Beijing	Wrestling	Men's Greco-Roman 120 kg
Bronze	Virgilijus Alekna	2008 Beijing	Athletics	Men's discus throw
Bronze	Andrejus Zadneprovskis	2008 Beijing	Modern pentathlon	Men's event
Gold	Laura Asadauskaitė	2012 London	Modern pentathlon	Women's event
Gold	Rūta Meilutytė	2012 London	Swimming	Women's 100 m breaststroke
Bronze	Evaldas Petrauskas	2012 London	Boxing	Men's lightweight
Bronze	Austra Skujytė	2012 London	Athletics	Women's heptathlon
Bronze	Aleksandr Kazakevič	2012 London	Wrestling	Men's Greco-Roman 74 kg
Silver	Mindaugas Griškonis; Saulius Ritter	2016 Rio de Janeiro	Rowing	Men's double sculls
Bronze	Milda Valčiukaitė; Donata Vištartaitė	2016 Rio de Janeiro	Rowing	Women's double sculls
Bronze	Aurimas Didžbalis	2016 Rio de Janeiro	Weightlifting	Men's 94 kg
Bronze	Aurimas Lankas; Edvinas Ramanauskas	2016 Rio de Janeiro	Canoeing	Men's K-2 200 m
Silver	Laura Asadauskaitė	2020 Tokyo	Modern pentathlon	Women's event
Bronze	Viktorija Senkutė	2024 Paris	Rowing	Women's single sculls
Bronze	Evaldas Džiaugys; Aurelijus Pukelis; Šarūnas Vingelis; Gintautas Matulis	2024 Paris	3x3 basketball	Men's 3x3 basketball
Silver	Mykolas Alekna	2024 Paris	Athletics	Men's discus throw
Silver	Dominika Banevič	2024 Paris	Breaking	B-Girls

== List of gold medal winners ==
No.	Name	Sport	Year
In the Soviet Union
1	Vasilijus Matuševas	Volleyball	1968
2	Danas Pozniakas	Boxing	1968
3	Vladislavas Česiūnas	Canoeing	1972
4	Modestas Paulauskas	Basketball	1972
5	Vida Beselienė	Basketball	1980
6	Aldona Česaitytė-Nenėnienė	Handball	1976 and 1980
7	Lina Kačiušytė	Swimming	1980
8	Sigita Mažeikaitė-Strečen	Handball	1980
9	Angelė Rupšienė	Basketball	1976 and 1980
10	Remigijus Valiulis	Athletics	1980
11	Robertas Žulpa	Swimming	1980
12	Algimantas Šalna	Biathlon	1984
13	Valdemaras Chomičius	Basketball	1988
14	Arvydas Janonis	Football	1988
15	Artūras Kasputis	Cycling	1988
16	Rimas Kurtinaitis	Basketball	1988
17	Šarūnas Marčiulionis	Basketball	1988
18	Arminas Narbekovas	Football	1988
19	Valdemaras Novickis	Handball	1988
20	Arvydas Sabonis	Basketball	1988
21	Gintautas Umaras	Cycling	1988 (twice)
22	Vida Vencienė	Cross country skiing	1988
Independent Lithuania
23	Romas Ubartas	Athletics	1992
24	Daina Gudzinevičiūtė	Shooting	2000
25	Virgilijus Alekna	Athletics	2000 and 2004
26	Rūta Meilutytė	Swimming	2012
27	Laura Asadauskaitė	Modern pentathlon	2012

== Olympic participants ==
=== Summer Olympics ===
Sport	1924	1928	1992	1996	2000	2004	2008	2012	2016	2020	2024	Athletes
Athletics		5	8	14	18	12	18	20	16	11	11	82
Badminton							2	1				2
Basketball			12	11	12	12	12	12	12		4	56
Boxing		2	4	1	2	2	3	2	2			14
Breaking											1	1
Canoeing/Kayaking			1	2	3	3	4	2	6	1	5	18
Cycling	2	4	5	13	8	9	8	4	4	5	3	40
Equestrian											2	2
Football	11											11
Gymnastics				1	1		1	2	1	1	1	6
Judo			1	1	1	1	1	2	1	1		7
Modern pentathlon			3	1	1	2	4	3	3	3	2	10
Rowing			8	3	2	2	1	4	10	9	8	29
Sailing			2		1	1	1	3	2	2	2	8
Shooting				1	1	1	1	1	1	1		3
Swimming			2	8	6	10	9	4	6	6	7	32
Table Tennis				1	2		1					2
Tennis									1			1
Volleyball											2	2
Weightlifting		1		1	1	1	1		1	1		4
Wrestling			1	3	2	3	4	2	1	1	3	12
Total	13	12	47	61	61	59	71	62	67	42	51	342

=== Winter Olympics ===
Sport	1928	1992	1994	1998	2002	2006	2010	2014	2018	2022	2026	Athletes
Alpine skiing				1		1	1	2	2	2	2	7
Biathlon		2	2	1	2	2	1	2	4	5	8	16
Cross-country skiing		2	2	3	4	2	4	2	3	4	4	15
Figure skating		2	2	2	2	2		2		2	3	9
Short track speed skating								1				1
Speed skating	1											1
Total	1	6	6	7	8	7	6	9	9	13	17	48

== See also ==
- List of flag bearers for Lithuania at the Olympics
- Category:Olympic competitors for Lithuania
- Lithuania at the Paralympics
