= Linas Vaitkus =

American-Lithuanian alpine skier (born 1973)

Personal information
- Born: 24 March 1973 (age 53) Chicago, United States

Linas Vaitkus (born 24 March 1973) is an American-Lithuanian alpine skier.

In 1998, Vaitkus represented Lithuania in 1998 Winter Olympic Games where he finished 25th in downhill.
