= Lithuania at the 2018 Winter Olympics =

- Flag of Lithuania
- IOC code: LTU
- NOC: Lithuanian National Olympic Committee
- Website: www.ltok.lt/en

in Pyeongchang, South Korea 9–25 February 2018
- Competitors: 9 (5 men and 4 women) in 3 sports
- Flag bearers: Tomas Kaukėnas (opening); Andrej Drukarov (closing)
- Medals: Gold 0 Silver 0 Bronze 0 Total 0

Winter Olympics appearances (overview)
- 1928; 1932–1988; 1992; 1994; 1998; 2002; 2006; 2010; 2014; 2018; 2022; 2026

Other related appearances
- Soviet Union (1956–1988)

Lithuania participated at the 2018 Winter Olympics held in Pyeongchang held between 9 and 25 February 2018. The country's participation in the Games marked its ninth appearance at the Winter Olympics after its debut in the 1928 Games. The Lithuanian team consisted of nine athletes who competed in three sports. Tomas Kaukėnas served as the country's flag-bearer during the opening ceremony and Andrej Drukarov was the flag-bearer during the closing ceremony. Lithuania did not win any medal in the Games, and has not won a Winter Olympics medal previously.

== Background ==
The 1924 Summer Olympics marked Lithuania's first participation in the Olympic Games. The nation made its debut in the Winter Olympics at the 1928 Winter Olympics. After its debut in 1928, the country did not participate in the Winter Games till the 1992 Games. The Lithuanian National Olympic Committee was recognized by the International Olympic Committee (IOC) in 1991. The country's participation in the 2018 Games marked its ninth appearance at the Winter Olympics.

The 2018 Winter Olympics was held in Pyeongchang held between 9 and 25 February 2018. The Lithuanian delegation consisted of six athletes. Tomas Kaukėnas served as the country's flag-bearer during the opening ceremony and Andrej Drukarov was the flag-bearer during the closing ceremony. Lithuania did not win any medal in the Games, and has not won a Winter Olympics medal previously.

== Competitors ==
Lithuania sent nine athletes including four women who competed in three sports at the Games.

Sport	Men	Women	Total
Alpine skiing	1	1	2
Biathlon	2	2	4
Cross-country skiing	2	1	3
Total	5	4	9

== Alpine skiing ==
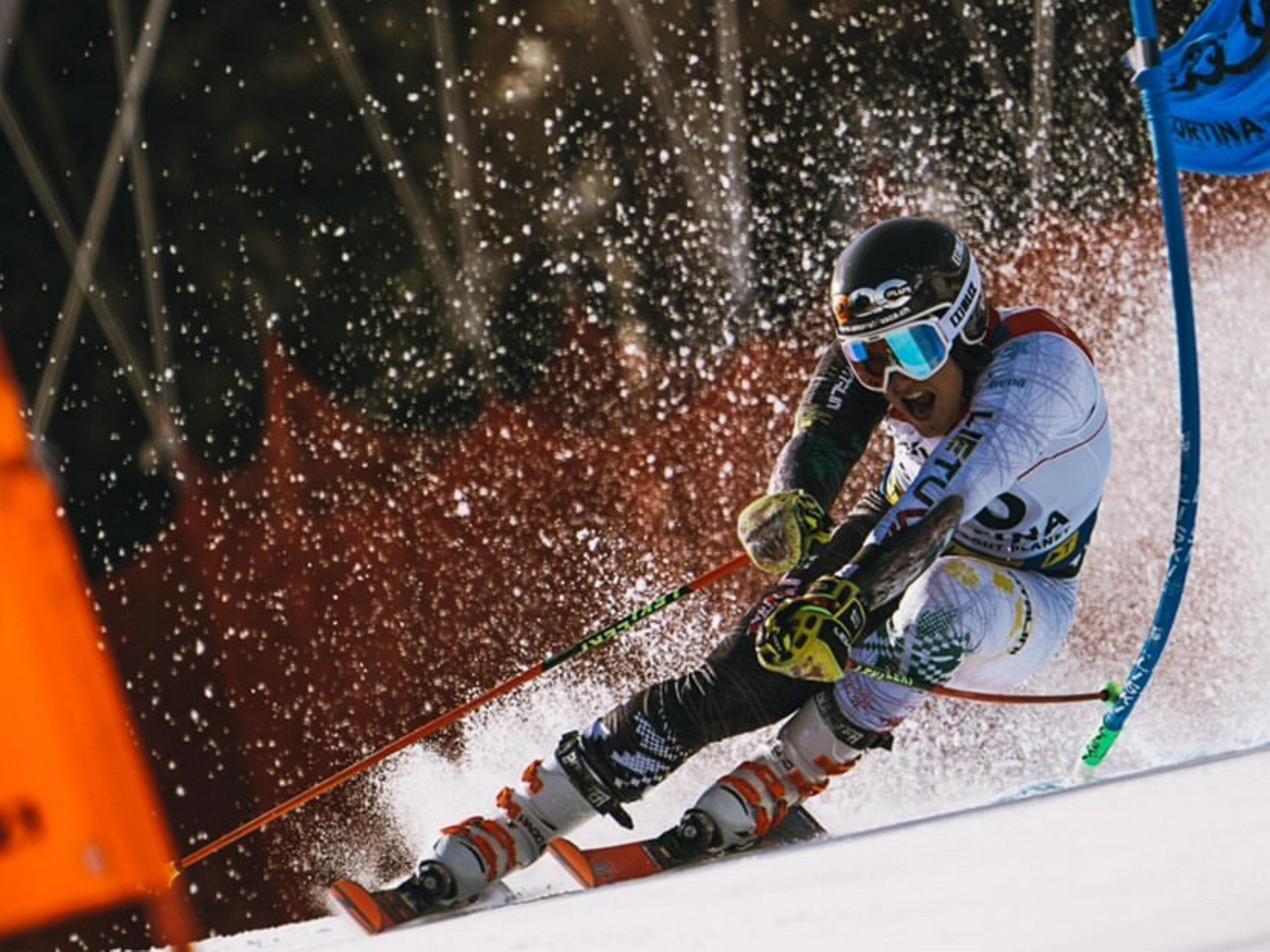
Andrej Drukarov participated in the men's alpine skiing event

Lithuania qualified one male and one female athlete for the alpine skiing events. Andrej Drukarov made his debut at the Winter Games at the event. He had previously participated in the alpine skiing events at the 2016 Winter Youth Olympics. In the women's events, Ieva Januškevičiūtė participated in her second Winter Games.

The Alpine skiing events were held at the Jeongseon Alpine Centre in Bukpyeong. The course for the events was designed by former Olympic champion Bernhard Russi. The weather was cold and windy during the events, and it was the coldest since the 1994 Winter Olympics at Lillehammer. In the men's slalom event, Drukarov crossed the course in just over 59 seconds to be ranked 41st amongst the 106 competitors. In the giant slalom event, he finished more than 17 seconds behind the leader Marcel Hirscher and was classified 59th amongst the 109 contestants. In the women's slalom event, Januškevičiūtė crossed the course in just over 57 seconds to be ranked 43rd amongst the 78 competitors. In the giant slalom event, she finished more than 26 seconds behind the leader Mikaela Shiffrin and was classified 43rd amongst the 79 contestants.

Athlete	Event	Run 1		Run 2		Total	
Athlete	Event	Time	Rank	Time	Rank	Time	Rank
Andrej Drukarov	Men's giant slalom	1:19.98	68	1:18.21	57	2:38.19	59
Andrej Drukarov	Men's slalom	59.40	47	1:07.77	42	2:07.17	41
Ieva Januškevičiūtė	Women's giant slalom	1:26.38	62	1:20.64	53	2:47.02	54
Ieva Januškevičiūtė	Women's slalom	57.30	47	57.25	43	1:54.55	43

== Biathlon ==
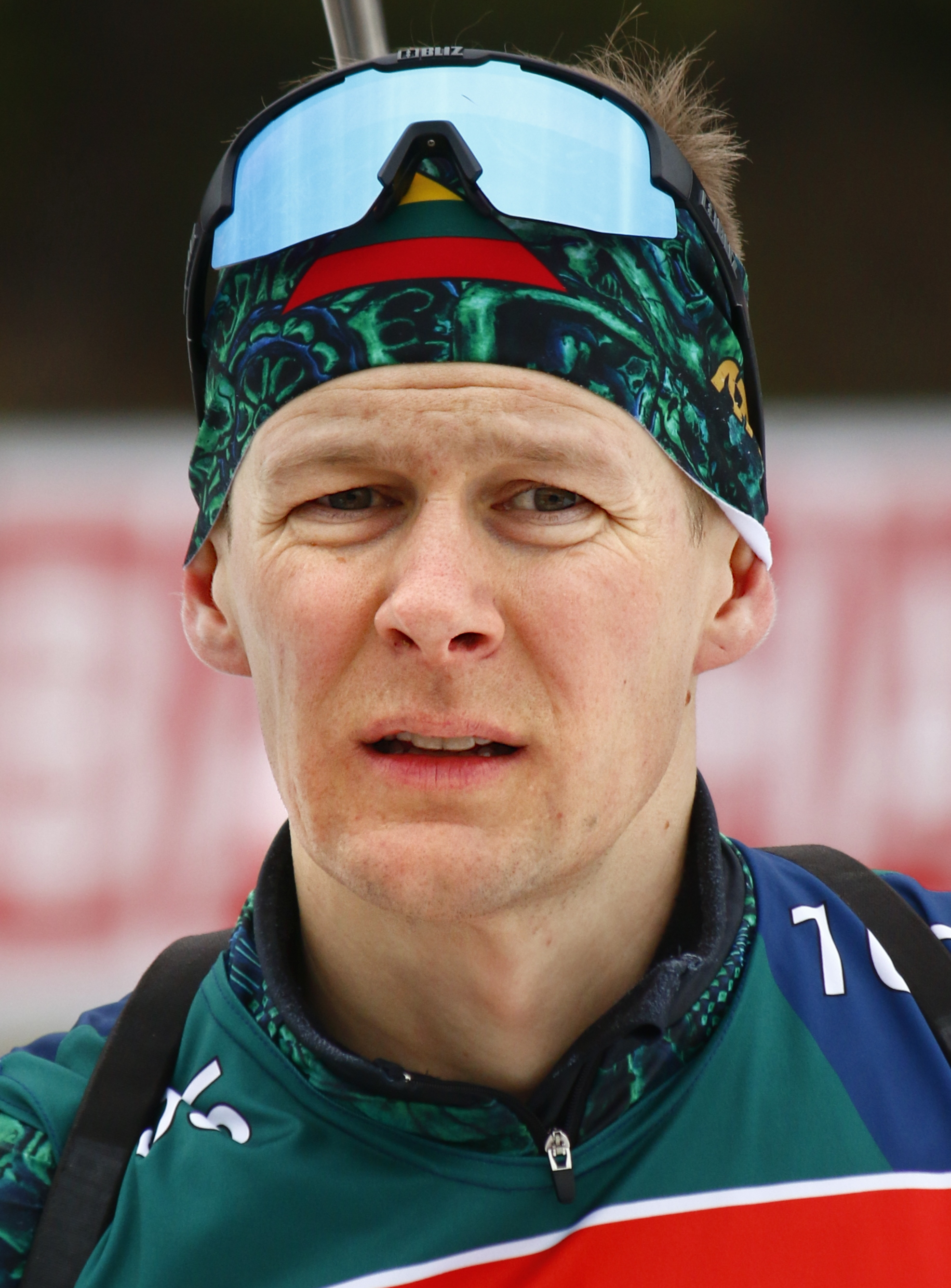
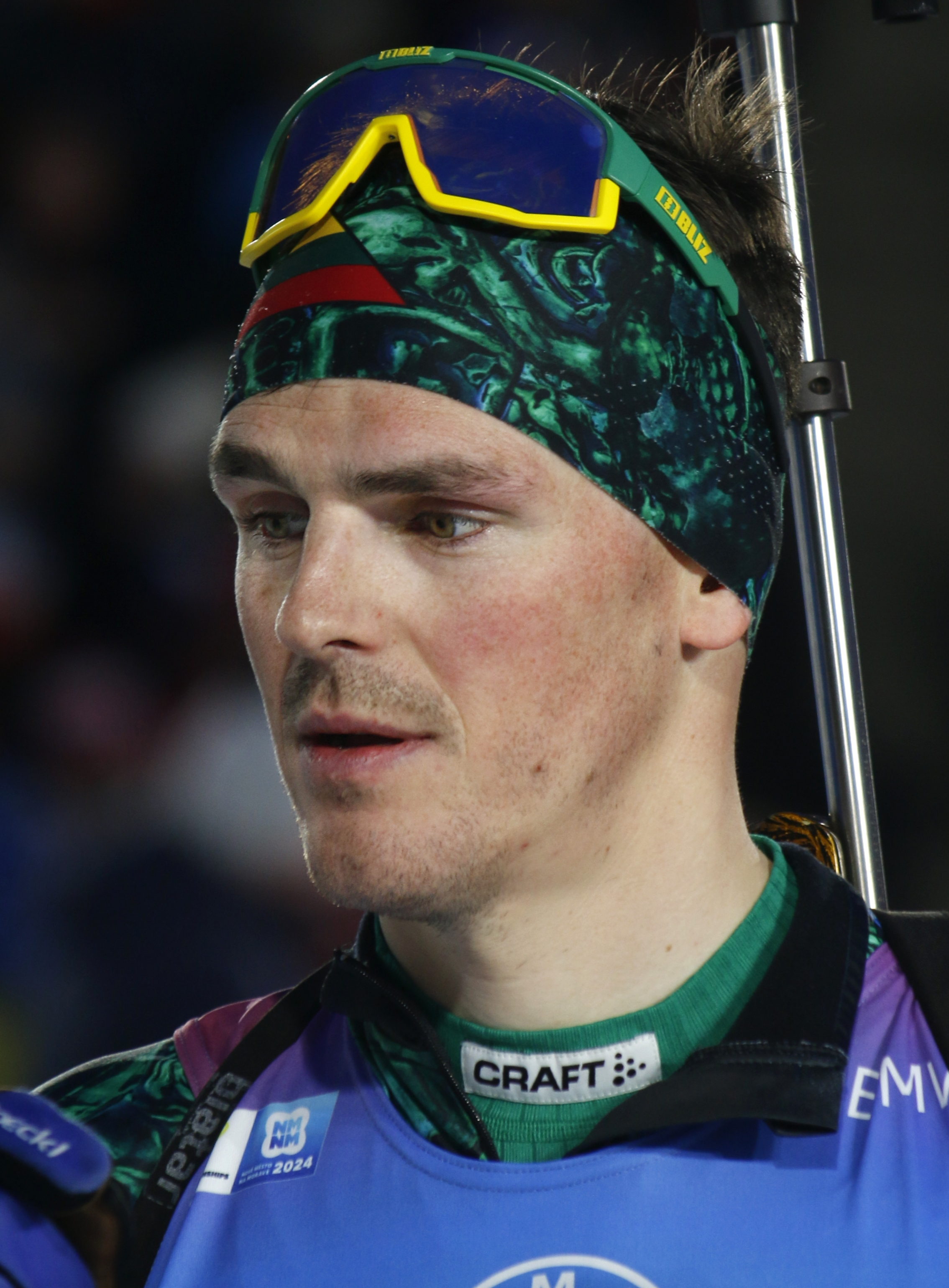
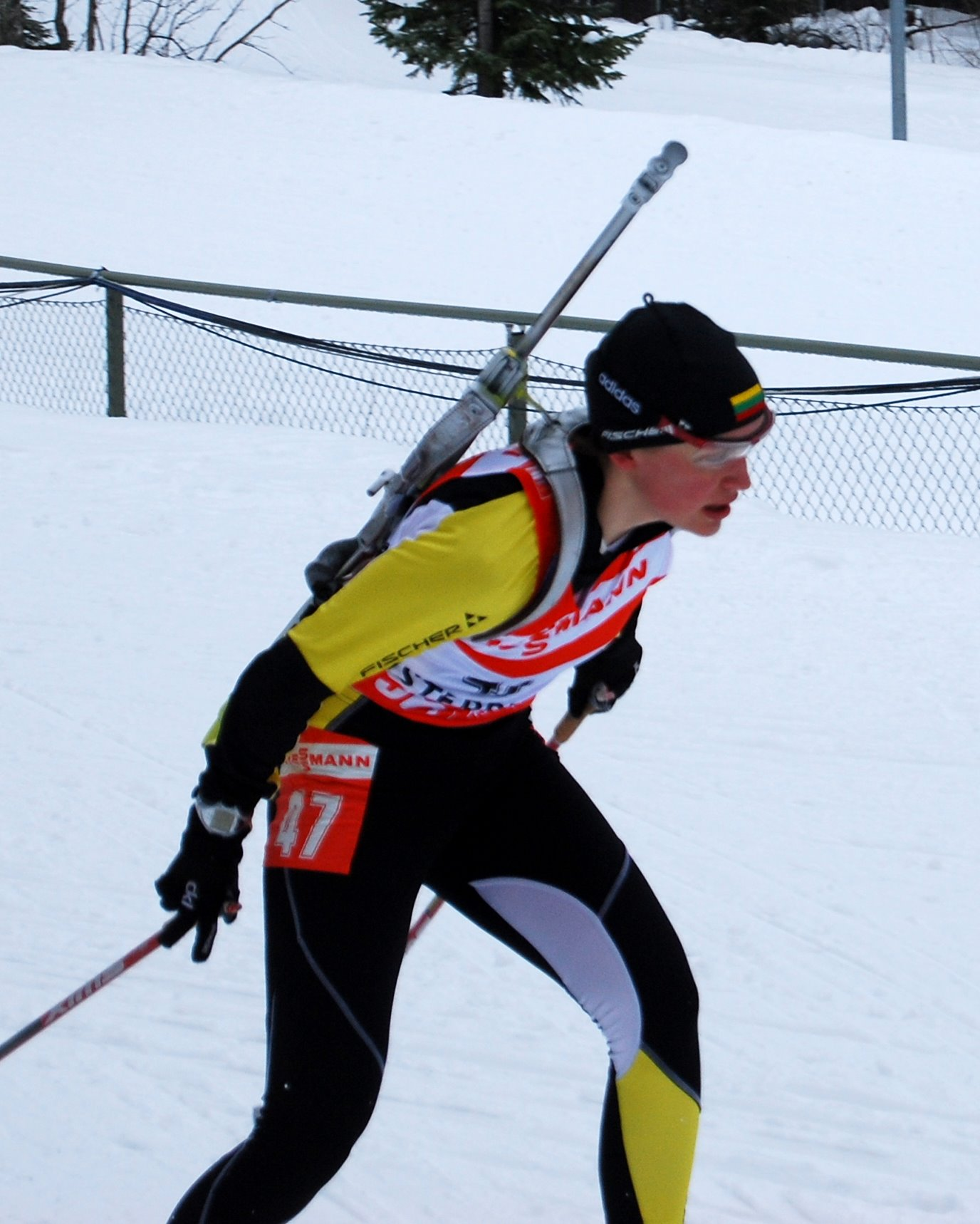
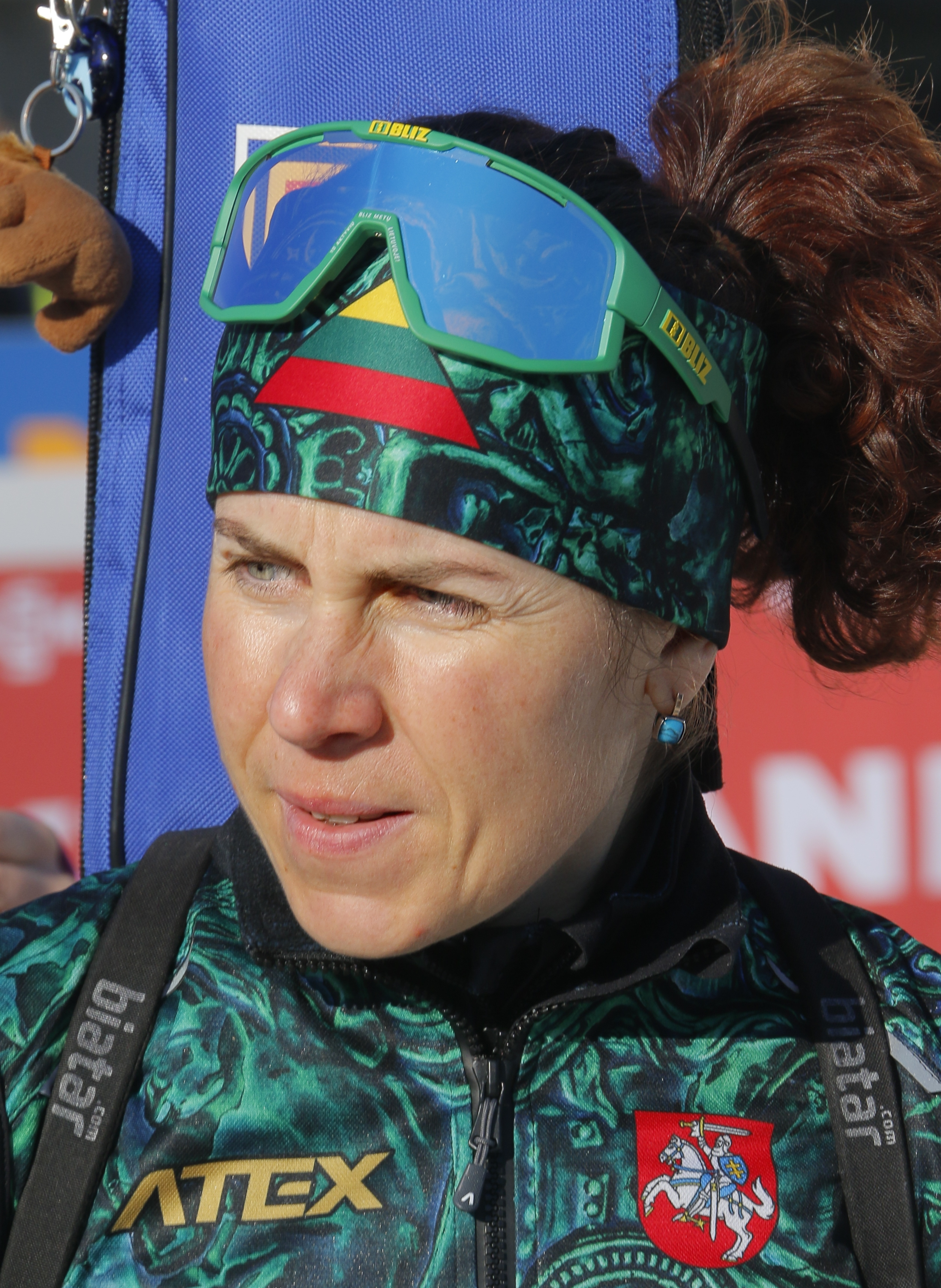
From top left to right: Tomas Kaukėnas, Vytautas Strolia, Diana Rasimovičiūtė, and Natalija Kočergina

Biathlon competitions were held at the Alpensia Biathlon Centre from 10 to 23 February. Based on their Nations Cup ranking in the 2016–17 Biathlon World Cup, Lithuania was allocated two qualifying slots each for men and women. Four Lithuanian athletes participated across seven events in biathlon. Amongst the men, both Tomas Kaukėnas and Vytautas Strolia were participating in their second straight Winter Games. In the women's section, this was the fifth consecutive Olympic appearance for Diana Rasimovičiūtė, while Natalija Kočergina made her debut.

The biathlon events consisted of a skiing a specific course multiple times depending on the length of the competition, with intermediate shooting at various positions. For every shot missed, a penalty of one minute is applied in individual events, and the participant is required to ski through a penalty loop in sprint events. In the men's events, Kaukėnas registered the best finish of 13th amongst the 60 competitors in the men's pursuit. In the women's events, Kočergina was the best placed woman skier for Lithuania after she was classified 30th in the women's individual event.

Athlete	Event	Time	Misses	Rank
Tomas Kaukėnas	Men's sprint	24:23.5	1 (0+1)	17
Tomas Kaukėnas	Men's pursuit	34:31.8	2 (0+0+1+1)	13
Tomas Kaukėnas	Men's individual	55:38.4	6 (0+2+1+3)	78
Tomas Kaukėnas	Men's mass start	38:58.0	5 (2+0+2+1)	30
Vytautas Strolia	Men's sprint	25:32.4	2 (1+1)	49
Vytautas Strolia	Men's pursuit	37:47.3	4 (1+0+2+1)	43
Vytautas Strolia	Men's individual	56:27.0	6 (0+2+1+3)	82
Diana Rasimovičiūtė	Women's sprint	24:00.8	1 (1+0)	65
Diana Rasimovičiūtė	Women's individual	49:53.3	5 (1+2+0+2)	75
Natalija Kočergina	Women's sprint	25:16.2	5 (1+4)	80
Natalija Kočergina	Women's individual	45:09.1	1 (0+0+1+0)	30
Natalija Kočergina; Diana Rasimovičiūtė; Tomas Kaukėnas; Vytautas Strolia	Mixed team relay	LAP	8 (4+4)	19

== Cross-country skiing ==
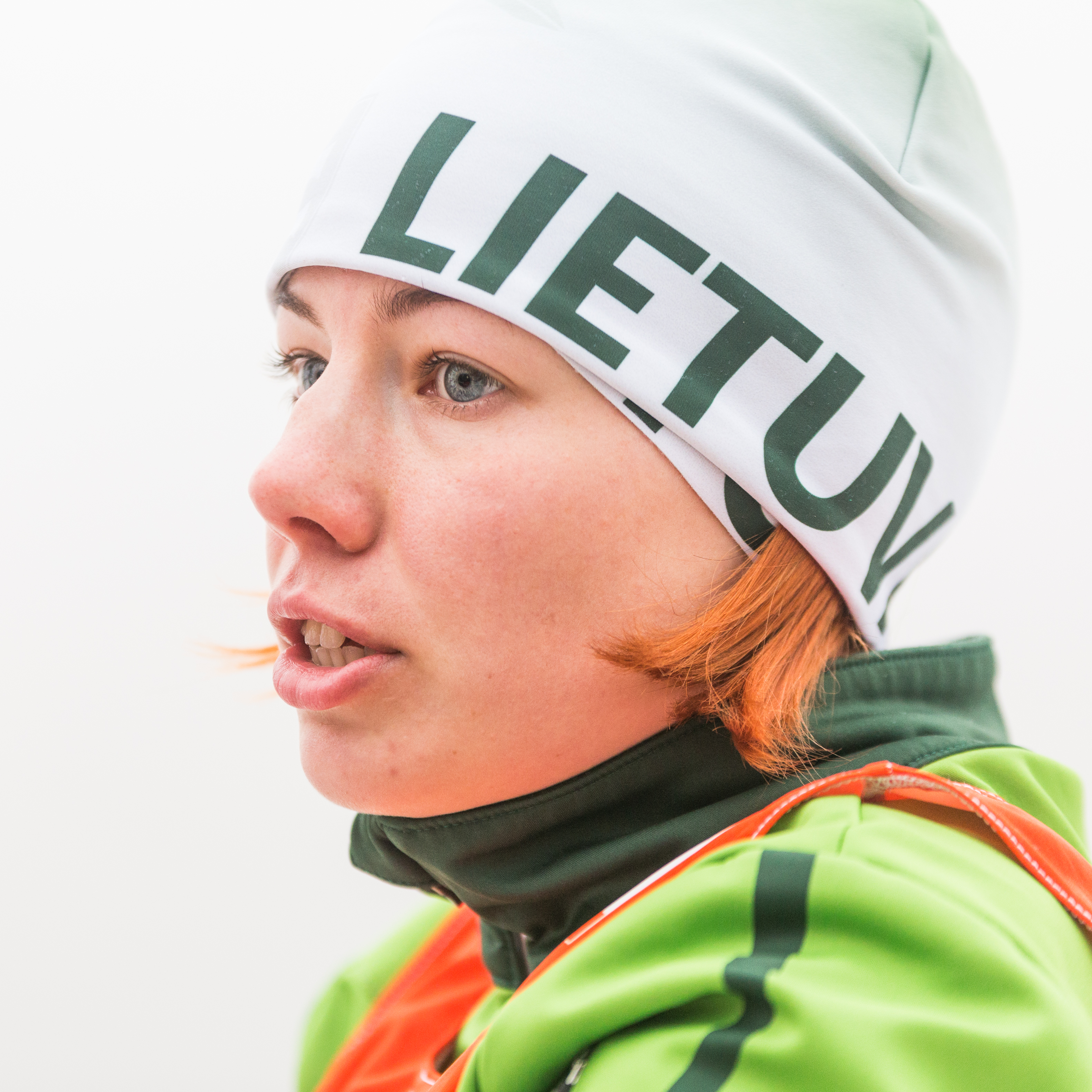
Marija Kaznačenko

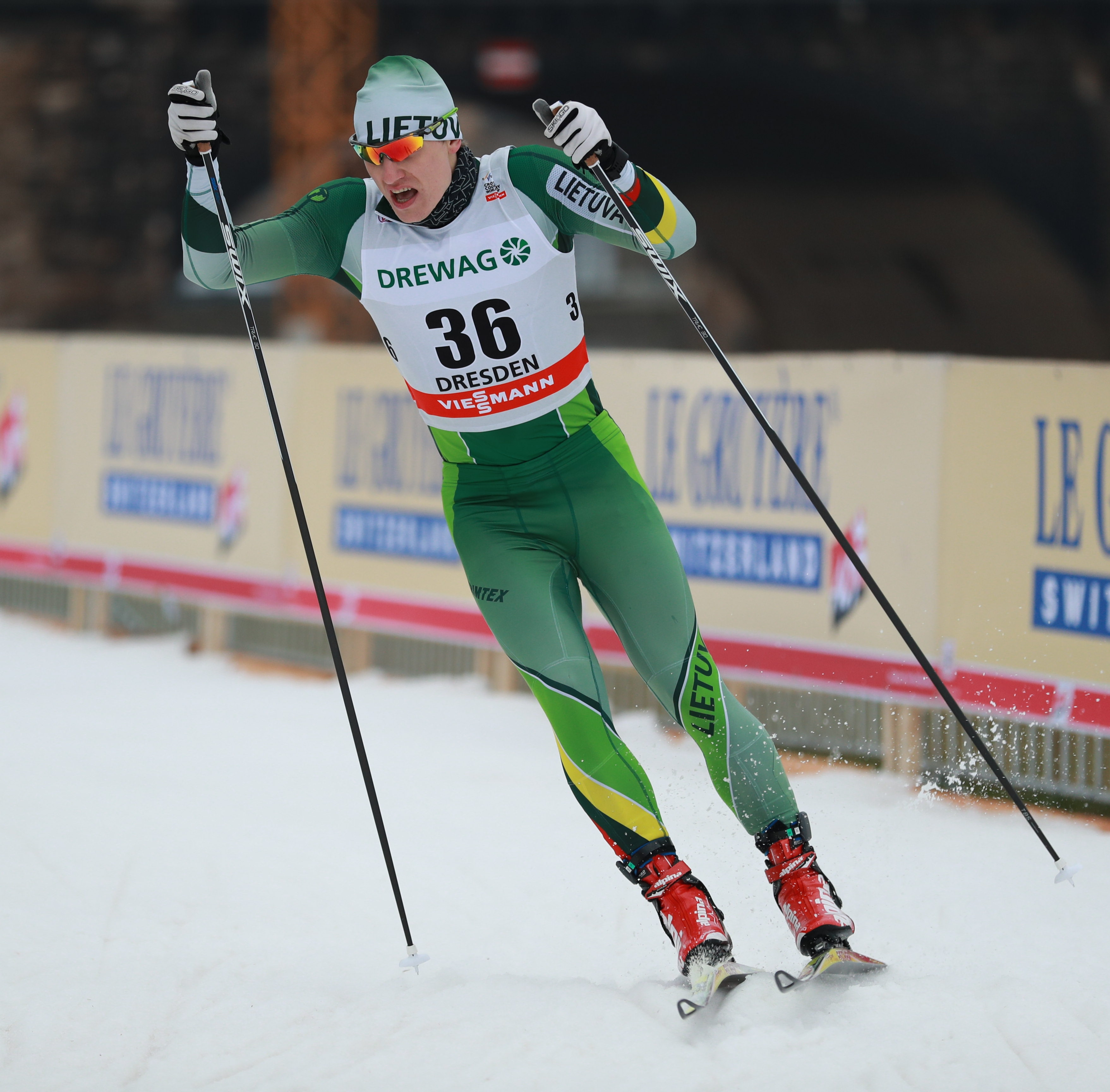
Modestas Vaičiulis

As per the standards laid down by the International Ski Federation, athletes with a maximum of 300 points in the stipulated period were allowed to compete in the distance event. The same criteria was 120 points for the sprint events. Lithuania qualified three athletes for the cross-country event. This was the second Winter Olympics appearance for Mantas Strolia and Modestas Vaičiulis after their debut in the 2010 Winter Olympics. In the women's category, Marija Kaznačenko made her debut at the Games.

The main events were held at the Alpensia Cross-Country Skiing Centre. In the distance events, none of the athletes achieved a top 50 finish. The best result came from Strolia in the men's 30 km skiathlon event. In the sprint races, the team of Strolia and Vaičiulis failed to advance to the finals, and was ranked 24th amongst the 56 teams in the final classification.

Distance

Athlete	Event	Classical		Freestyle		Total		
Athlete	Event	Time	Rank	Time	Rank	Time	Deficit	Rank
Mantas Strolia	Men's 15 km freestyle	—N/a				40:31.4	+6:47.5	90
Mantas Strolia	Men's 30 km skiathlon	47:04.4	65	LAP				
Mantas Strolia	Men's 50 km classical	—N/a				LAP		
Modestas Vaičiulis	Men's 15 km freestyle	—N/a				40:53.0	+7:09.1	92
Marija Kaznačenko	Women's 10 km freestyle	—N/a				30:44.2	+5:43.7	73

Sprint

Athlete	Event	Qualification		Quarterfinal		Semifinal		Final	
Athlete	Event	Time	Rank	Time	Rank	Time	Rank	Time	Rank
Mantas Strolia	Men's sprint	3:31.11	64	Did not advance					
Modestas Vaičiulis	Men's sprint	3:21.10	44	Did not advance					
Mantas Strolia; Modestas Vaičiulis	Men's team sprint	—N/a				17:41.73	12	DNA	24
