= Lithuania at the 2006 Winter Olympics =

- IOC code: LTU
- NOC: Lithuanian National Olympic Committee
- Website: www.ltok.lt (in Lithuanian and English)

in Turin
- Competitors: 7 (4 men, 3 women) in 4 sports
- Flag bearers: Vida Venciene (opening); Irina Terentjeva (closing)
- Medals: Gold 0 Silver 0 Bronze 0 Total 0

Winter Olympics appearances (overview)
- 1928; 1932–1988; 1992; 1994; 1998; 2002; 2006; 2010; 2014; 2018; 2022; 2026

Other related appearances
- Soviet Union (1956–1988)

Lithuania participated at the 2006 Winter Olympics held in Turin held between 10 and 26 February 2006. The country's participation in the Games marked its sixth appearance at the Winter Olympics after its debut in the 1928 Games. The Lithuanian team consisted of seven athletes who competed in four sports. Vida Venciene served as the country's flag-bearer during the opening ceremony and Irina Terentjeva was the flag-bearer during the closing ceremony. Lithuania did not win any medal in the Games, and has not won a Winter Olympics medal previously.

== Background ==
The 1924 Summer Olympics marked Lithuania's first participation in the Olympic Games. The nation made its debut in the Winter Olympics at the 1928 Winter Olympics. After its debut in 1928, the country did not participate in the Winter Games till the 1992 Games. The Lithuanian National Olympic Committee was recognized by the International Olympic Committee (IOC) in 1991. The country's participation in the 2006 Games marked its sixth appearance at the Winter Olympics.

The 2006 Winter Olympics was held in Turin held between 10 and 26 February 2006. The Lithuanian team consisted of seven athletes. Vida Venciene served as the country's flag-bearer during the opening ceremony and Irina Terentjeva was the flag-bearer during the closing ceremony. Lithuania did not win any medal in the Games, and has not won a Winter Olympics medal previously.

== Competitors ==
Lithuania sent seven athletes including three women who competed in four sports at the Games.

Sport	Men	Women	Total
Alpine skiing	1	0	1
Biathlon	1	1	2
Cross-country skiing	1	1	2
Figure skating	1	1	2
Total	4	3	7

== Alpine skiing ==
Lithuania qualified one male athlete for the alpine skiing event. Vitalij Rumiancev made his debut at the Winter Games at the event. He had previously participated in the alpine skiing events at the 2016 Winter Youth Olympics.

The Alpine skiing events were held at Sestriere, about 60 km (37 mi) from Turin. Many of the events were delayed due to inclement weather conditions. In the men's slalom event, Drukarov crossed the course in just over two minutes and 13 seconds to be ranked 44th amongst the 93 competitors. He did not complete the giant slalom event.

Athlete	Event	Final			
Athlete	Event	Run 1	Run 2	Total	Rank
Vitalij Rumiancev	Men's giant slalom	DQ			
Vitalij Rumiancev	Men's slalom	1:09.19	1:04.27	2:13.46	44

== Biathlon ==
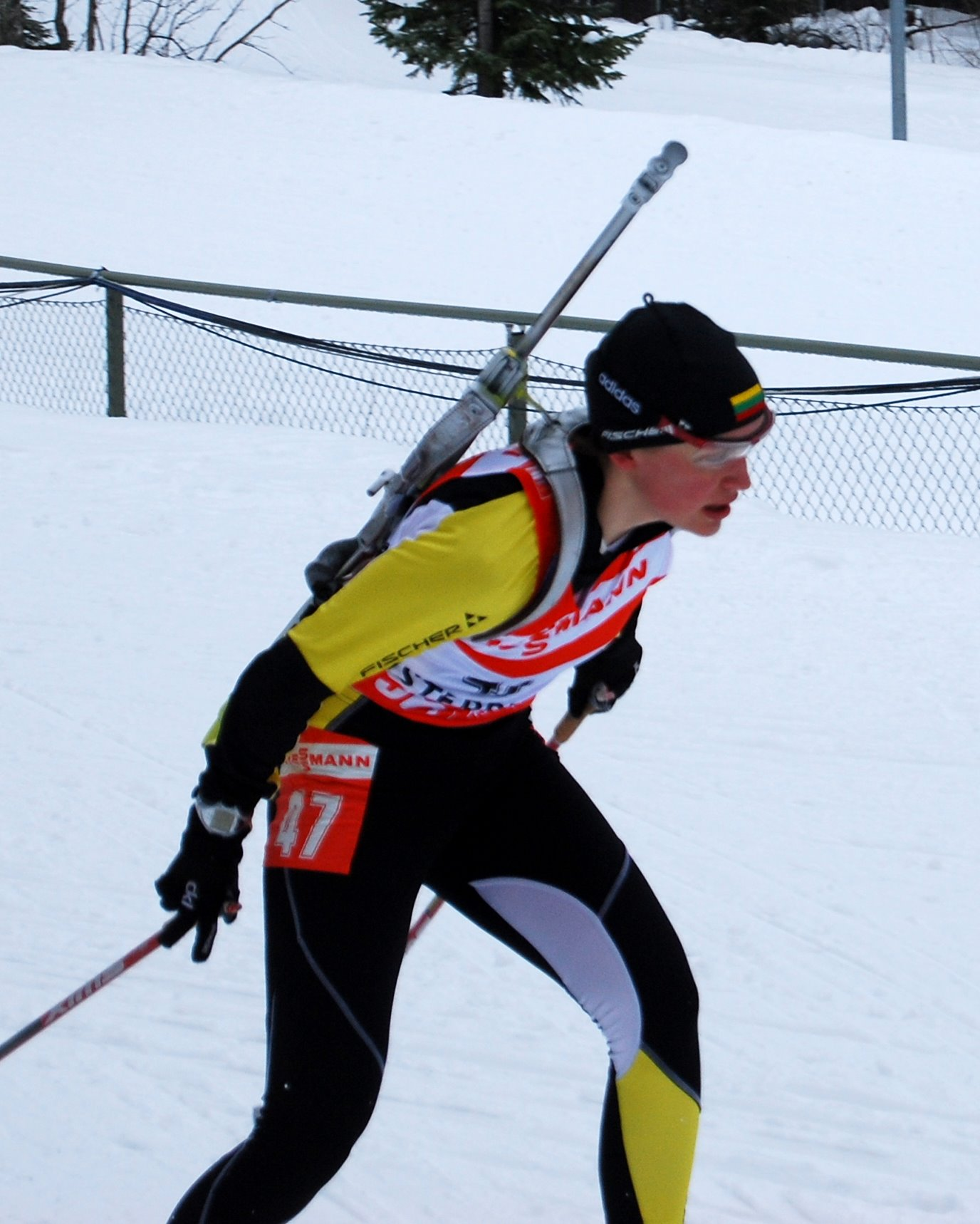
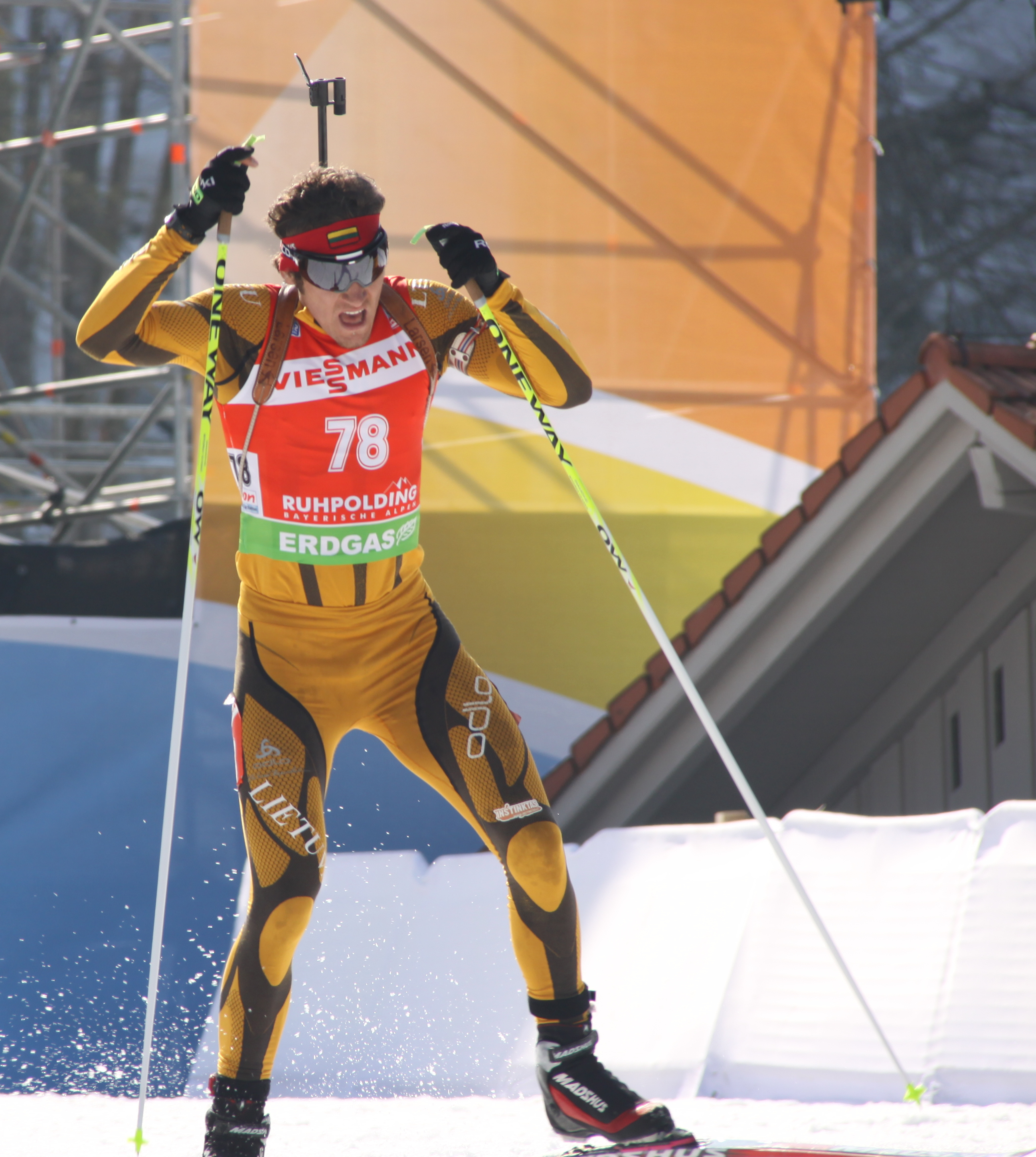
Diana Rasimovičiūtė (left) and Karolis Zlatkauskas

Biathlon competitions were held at the newly constructed Cesana San Sicario Arena between 11 and 25 February. This was the first time that an Olympic programme had ten medal events in the biathlon competition. Two Lithuanian athletes participated across four events in biathlon. The biathlon events consisted of a skiing a specific course multiple times depending on the length of the competition, with intermediate shooting at various positions. For every shot missed, a penalty of one minute is applied in individual events, and the participant is required to ski through a penalty loop in sprint events.

In the men's events, debutante Karolis Zlatkauskas finished 88th in the sprint event. In the women's section, this was the second consecutive Olympic appearance for Diana Rasimovičiūtė. She participated in all of the women's individual medal events. She registered her best finish in the sprint event, in which she was placed 18th amongst the 83 competitors. In the individual event, she finished 66th amongst the 82 participants.

Athlete	Event	Final		
Athlete	Event	Time	Misses	Rank
Karolis Zlatkauskas	Men's sprint	34:33.8	4	88
Diana Rasimovičiūtė	Women's sprint	23:48.1	1	18
Diana Rasimovičiūtė	Women's pursuit	41:56.37	5	27
Diana Rasimovičiūtė	Women's individual	1:00:04.4	8	66

== Cross-country skiing ==
Cross-country skiing events were held at the Stadio del Trampolino in Pragelato Plan. This was the second time that sprint competitions were held in the Winter Olympics after 2002. Aleksej Novoselkij and Irina Terentjeva represented the nation, and competed in both the distance and sprint events. This was Novoselkij's debut and only participation in the Winter Olympics, while Terentjeva participated in her second Winter Games. Novoselkij and Terentjeva finished 59th and 37th in the qualifying rounds of the men's and women's sprint events respectively, and did not qualify for the next round. In the distance rounds, only Terentjeva registered a finish in the women's pursuit event.

Distance

Athlete	Event	Final	
Athlete	Event	Total	Rank
Aleksej Novoselkij	Men's 15 km classical	DNF	
Aleksej Novoselkij	Men's 50 km freestyle	DNF	
Irina Terentjeva	Women's 30 km freestyle	DNF	
Irina Terentjeva	Women's 15 km pursuit	48:33.7	53

Sprint

Athlete	Event	Qualifying		Quarterfinal		Semifinal		Final	
Athlete	Event	Total	Rank	Total	Rank	Total	Rank	Total	Rank
Aleksej Novoselkij	Men's sprint	2:28.04	59	Did not advance					59
Irina Terentjeva	Women's sprint	2:20.08	37	Did not advance					37

== Figure skating ==
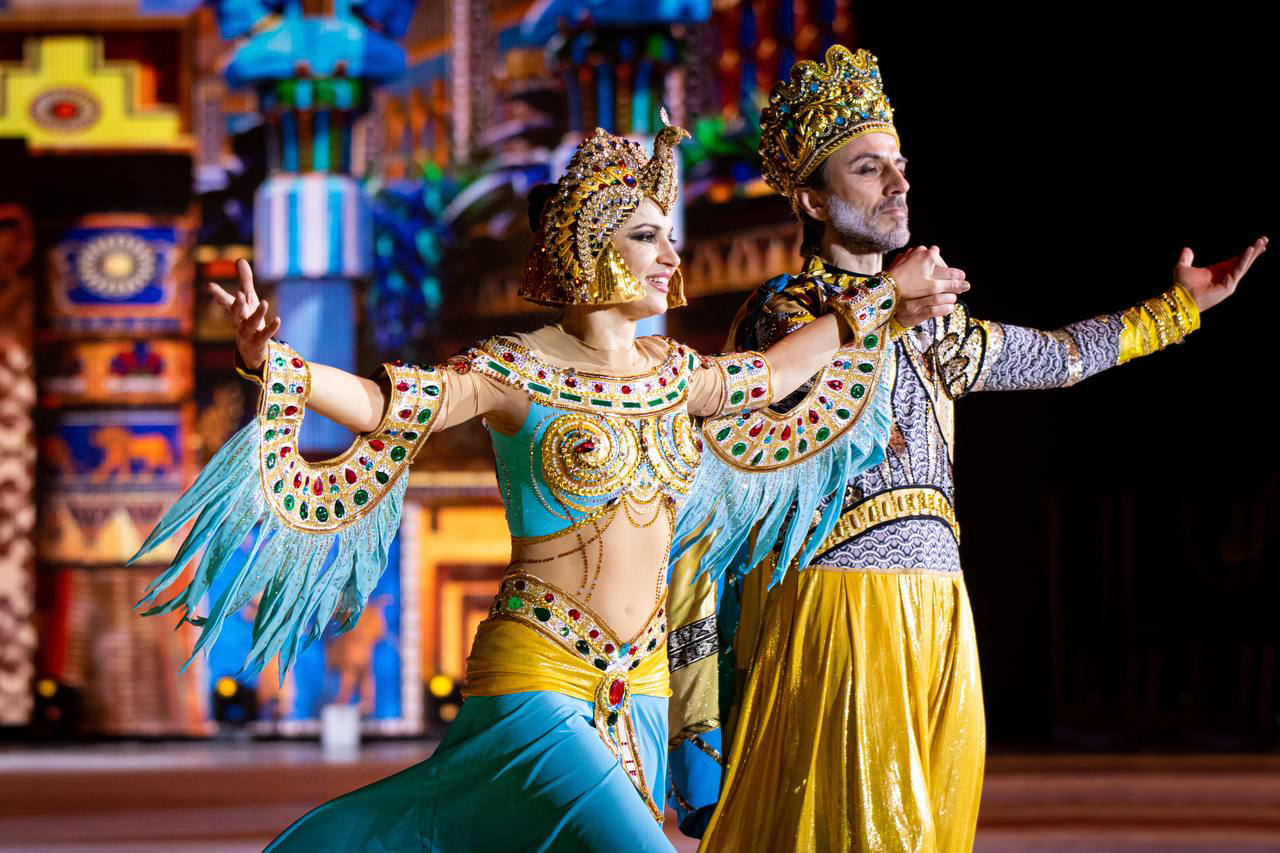
The pair of Margarita Drobiazko and Povilas Vanagas

Figure skating events were held at Palavela, Turin. Margarita Drobiazko and Povilas Vanagas participated in the ice dancing event. This was the couple's fifth consecutive Olympic appearance. They have won multiple medals in the World and European figure skating championships. The couples were ranked in ordinal order individually by the judges. At the end of the competition, the ranks are tallied for each pair, and the final placement was based on the majority placement. The Lithuanian pair was ranked seventh in the competition.

Athlete	Event	CD		SP/OD		FS/FD		Total	
Athlete	Event	Points	Rank	Points	Rank	Points	Rank	Points	Rank
Margarita Drobiazko; Povilas Vanagas	Ice dance	35.23	8	52.79	8	95.19	6	183.21	7

Key: CD = Compulsory Dance, FD = Free Dance, FS = Free Skate, OD = Original Dance, SP = Short Program
