= Kęstutis Bulota =

Lithuanian speed skater (1896–1941)

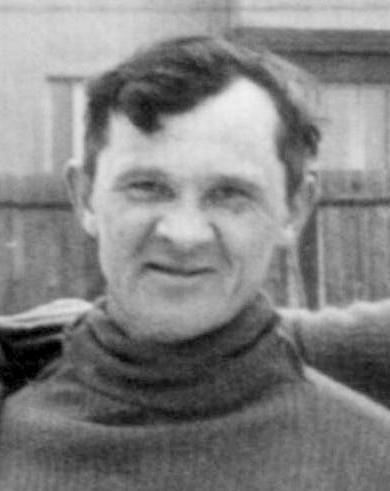
Kęstutis Bulota

Kęstutis Bulota (23 October 1896 – 1941) was a Lithuanian multi-sport athlete who participated in the 1928 Winter Olympics in speed skating.

== Life ==
Bulota was a co-founder of the LFLS Kaunas football club and a major figure in the development of sport in Lithuania. He won the national football title in 1922 and 1923 and won the ice hockey crown in 1926, 1931 and 1934. He also earned titles in track cycling, racewalking, relay racing, hammer throwing, and the standing high jump.

In 1928, Bulota had become Lithuania's first Winter Olympian. His best result was fifth place in the 10,000 metre race, which was ultimately abandoned due to thawing ice. On 14 June 1941, Bulota was deported to Siberia by Soviet authorities. He died there while trying to escape from the Sosna Gulag labour camp, where he was shot by security officers.
