= Deividas Stagniūnas =

Lithuanian ice dancer (born 1985)

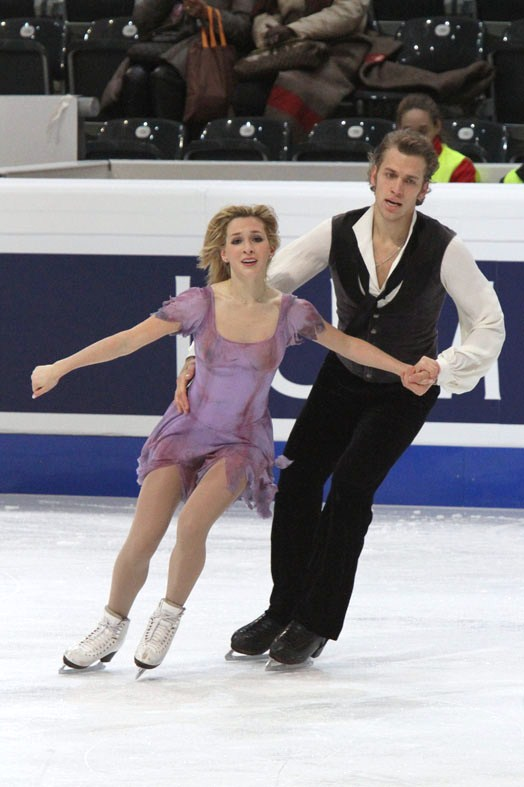
- Tobias and Stagniūnas in 2011.

Personal information
- Born: 28 April 1985 (age 41) Kaunas, Lithuanian SSR, Soviet Union
- Height: 1.82 m (6 ft 0 in)

Figure skating career
- Country: Lithuania
- Skating club: Baltų ainiai
- Began skating: 1990
- Retired: 2 May 2014

Deividas Stagniūnas (born 28 April 1985) is a Lithuanian former ice dancer. With Isabella Tobias, he is the 2011 Skate America bronze medalist and placed in the top ten at two European Championships. They represented Lithuania at the 2014 Winter Olympics, where Stagniūnas was the flagbearer.

== Career ==
=== Early years ===
Stagniūnas began skating at age five. He moved to the United States at age 15 to skate with a partner.

Early in his career, Stagniūnas was coached by Walter Wielunski and Natalia Dubova, who trained him in ice dancing. They trained in Darien, Illinois, where he lived with his partner, Laura Whipple. He and Whipple won the senior bronze medal at the Lake Placid ice dancing competition, representing Lithuania. In the 2003–2004 season, Stagniūnas began skating with Kayla Nicole Frey. They competed internationally on the junior level and were three-time (2004–2006) Lithuanian silver medalists.

=== Partnership with Copely ===
In 2006, Stagniūnas formed a partnership with American Katherine Copely. They became the 2007 Lithuanian national champions and 2006 and 2007 Golden Spin of Zagreb bronze medalists. The duo qualified an entry for the 2010 Winter Olympics in the ice dancing event when they placed 14th at the 2009 World Championships. According to IOC rules, competitors must have citizenship of the country they are representing; however, Copely's special request for citizenship was denied by Lithuanian President Dalia Grybauskaitė. The spot was left unfilled. Copely retired from competition due to an injury which was subsequently treated arthroscopically, followed by a complete recovery. She is currently attending medical school in the U.S.

=== Partnership with Tobias ===
In spring 2010, Stagniūnas teamed up with American ice dancer Isabella Tobias. They initially trained under Igor Shpilband and Marina Zueva in Canton, Michigan. Tobias/Stagniūnas made their debut at the 2010 Nebelhorn Trophy, where they placed 11th, and won their first international medal, bronze, at the 2010 NRW Trophy. At their first European and World Championships, they placed 12th and 14th, respectively.

Tobias/Stagniūnas won bronze at a Grand Prix event, the 2011 Skate America. In June 2012, they moved from Canton, Michigan to Novi, Michigan, following coach Igor Shpilband. According to IOC rules, Olympic competitors must be citizens of the country they are representing. In order to allow the team to compete at the 2014 Winter Olympics, Tobias submitted an application for Lithuanian citizenship in October 2012. It was denied on 7 January 2013.

Tobias/Stagniūnas withdrew from the 2013 European Championships as a result of Stagniūnas' back problem. By finishing 15th at the 2013 World Championships in London, Ontario, they qualified a spot for Lithuania in the Olympic ice dancing event. Tobias was granted Lithuanian citizenship in December 2013. Tobias/Stagniūnas placed ninth at the 2014 European Championships in January in Budapest, 17th at the 2014 Winter Olympics in February in Sochi, and then 15th at the 2014 World Championships in March in Saitama. On 2 May 2014 Stagniūnas announced his competitive retirement due to recurring injuries.

== Programs ==
=== With Tobias ===
Season	Short dance	Free dance	Exhibition
2013–14	Foxtrot: A Fine Romance; Quickstep: Diamonds Are a Girl's Best Friends by Marilyn Monroe	James Bond Theme; Skyfall by Adele	
2012–13	Oklahoma! by Rodgers and Hammerstein	Piano Concerto No. 2 by Sergei Rachmaninov	
2011–12	Shakira medley	Let's Twist Again by Chubby Checker; Only You by The Platters; Tutti Frutti by Little Richard	Hips Don't Lie by Shakira
2010–11	Waltz of the Flowers (from The Nutcracker) by Pyotr I. Tchaikovsky	Les Misérables by Claude-Michel Schönberg	

=== With Copely ===
Season	Original dance	Free dance
2009–10	Lithuanian Polka	West Side Story by Leonard Bernstein
2008–09	Bei Mir Bist du Schön (from Swing Kids)	Evita by Andrew Lloyd Webber
2007–08	Two Guitars by Paul Mauriat	Beethoven's Last Night by Trans-Siberian Orchestra
2006–07	Tango by Jaime Wilensky	Kalinka

== Results ==
GP: Grand Prix; JGP: Junior Grand Prix

=== With Tobias ===
International
Event	2010–11	2011–12	2012–13	2013–14
Winter Olympics				17th
World Champ.	14th	18th	15th	15th
European Champ.	12th	9th		9th
GP Skate America		3rd		
GP Cup of Russia		5th		
Nebelhorn Trophy	11th	5th		
Golden Spin			4th	
NRW Trophy	3rd			
National
Lithuanian Champ.	1st	1st	1st	

=== With Copely ===
International
Event	2006–07	2007–08	2008–09	2009–10
World Champ.	23rd	14th	14th	
European Champ.	18th	12th	10th	
GP Cup of Russia		5th	6th	8th
GP Skate America			8th	
Golden Spin	3rd	3rd		
Nebelhorn Trophy	6th			3rd
National
Lithuanian Champ.	1st	1st	1st	1st

=== With Frey ===
International
Event	2003–04	2004–05	2005–06
World Junior Champ.		19th	
JGP Croatia			7th
JGP United States		10th	
International Ice Dance Cup			1st
National
Lithuanian Championships	2nd	2nd	2nd

Olympic Games
Preceded by Irina Terentjeva	Flagbearer for Lithuania; Sochi 2014	Succeeded by Incumbent
