= Tomas Kaukėnas =

Lithuanian biathlete (born 1990)

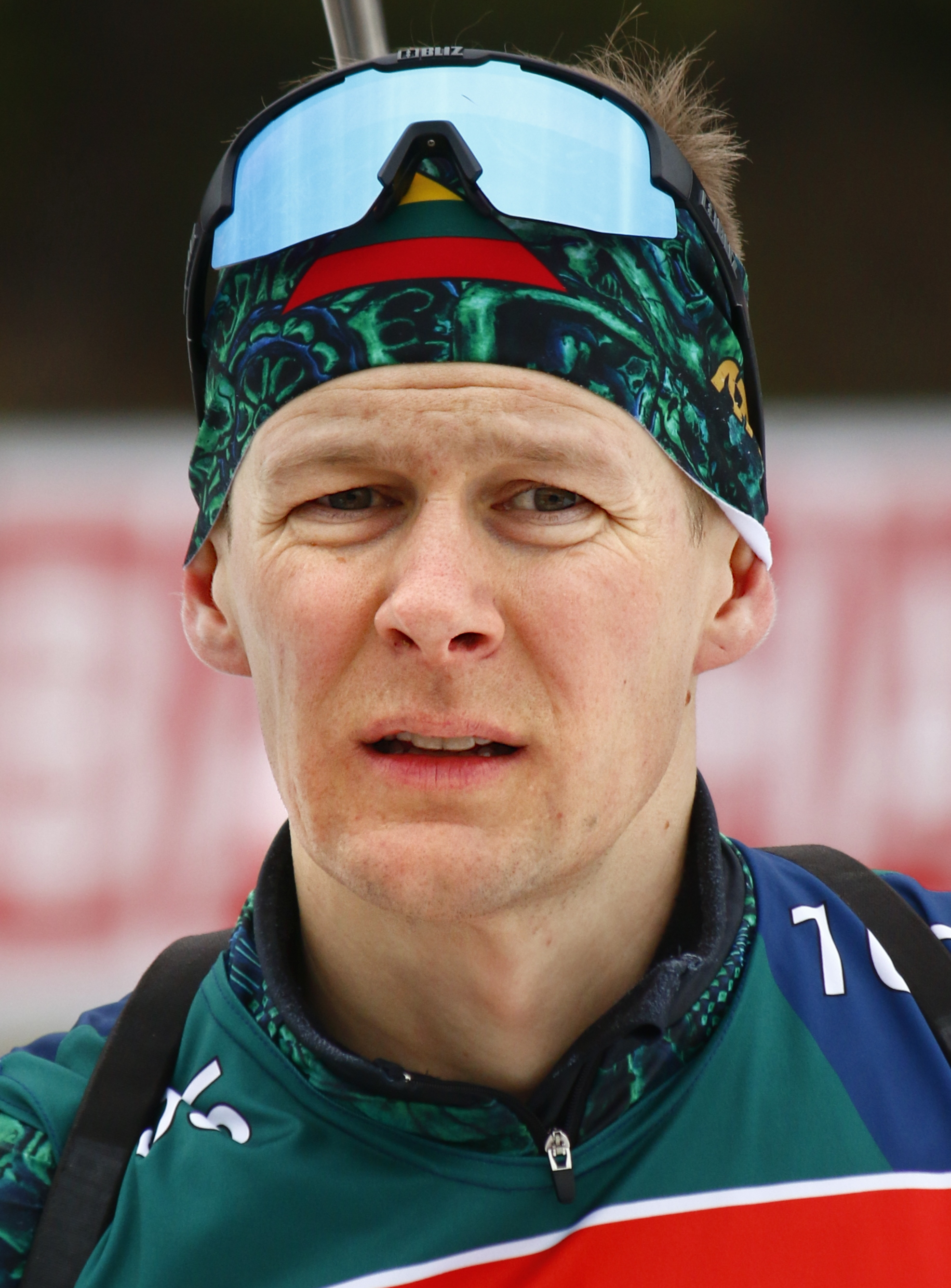
- Kaukėnas in 2024

Personal information
- Born: 1 May 1990 (age 36) Ignalina, Lithuania

Sport

Professional information
- Sport: Biathlon; Cross-country skiing
- Club: Vilimeksas
- World Cup debut: 17 January 2009

Olympic Games
- Teams: 3 (2014, 2018, 2022)
- Medals: 0

World Championships
- Teams: 11 (2011, 2012, 2013, 2015)
- Medals: 0

World Cup
- Seasons: 7 (2008/09–2025/26)
- All podiums: 0
Medal record
Men's biathlon
Representing Lithuania

Tomas Kaukėnas (born 1 May 1990) is a Lithuanian former athlete. He competes in biathlon and cross-country skiing events. He had represented Lithuania in three Winter Olympics Games in 2014, 2018, and 2022. He had also competed at the Biathlon World Cup and the World Biathlon Championships.

== Early life ==
Tomas Kaukėnas was born 1 May 1990 at Ignalina in Lithuania.

== Career ==
Kaukėnas started competing in the Biathlon World Cup events in 2009. His best result in the World Biathlon Championships was his 22nd place in the sprint event in 2013. Kaukėnas was named to the Lithuanian team for the 2014 Winter Olympics held at Sochi. This was his debut at the Winter Olympics. He competed in three events at the competition. He finished in 48th, 40th and 23rd place in the men's sprint, pursuit, and individual events respectively. He competed in a lone event in cross-country skiing in Latvia in 2015.

In 2018, Kaukėnas was named to the Lithuanian team for the 2018 Winter Olympics. This was his second consecutive appearance at the Winter Olympics. In the men's events, Kaukėnas competed in four individual events. He registered the best finish of 13th amongst the 60 competitors in the men's pursuit. He was part of the Lithuanian team for the 2022 Winter Olympics. This was his third and last appearance at the Winter Olympics. He competed in two events at the Games. He finished 70th and 80th in the sprint and individual events respectively.

== Biathlon results ==
All results are sourced from the International Biathlon Union.

=== Olympic Games ===
0 medals

Event	Individual	Sprint	Pursuit	Mass start	Relay	Mixed relay
(Russia) 2014 Sochi	23rd	48th	40th	—	—	—
(South Korea) 2018 Pyeongchang	78th	17th	13th	30th	—	19th
(China) 2022 Beijing	70th	80th	—	—	14th	—

=== World Championships ===
0 medals

Event	Individual	Sprint	Pursuit	Mass start	Relay	Mixed relay	Single Mixed relay
(Russia) 2011 Khanty-Mansiysk	74th	60th	59th	—N/a	25th	—N/a	—N/a
(Germany) 2012 Ruhpolding	74th	62nd	—N/a	—N/a	21st	25th	—N/a
(Czech Republic) 2013 Nové Město na Moravě	23rd	22nd	38th	29th	25th	25th	—N/a
(Finland) 2015 Kontiolahti	73rd	60th	56th	—N/a	23rd	23rd	—N/a
(Norway) 2016 Oslo	70th	21st	47th	—N/a	23rd	23rd	—N/a
(Austria) 2017 Hochfilzen	46th	31st	41st	—N/a	25th	—N/a	—N/a
(Sweden) 2019 Östersund	63rd	55th	DNS	—N/a	21st	24th	—N/a
(Italy) 2020 Antholz-Anterselva	74th	62nd	—N/a	—N/a	24th	—N/a	—N/a
(Slovenia) 2021 Pokljuka	52nd	75th	—N/a	—N/a	25th	—N/a	24th
(Germany) 2023 Oberhof	34th	70th	—	—	16th	—	21st
(Czech Republic) 2024 Nové Město na Moravě	70th	43rd	LAP	—	20th	—	—
(Switzerland) 2025 Lenzerheide	85th	91st	—	—	21nd	12th	—

*During Olympic seasons competitions are only held for those events not included in the Olympic program.
**The single mixed relay was added as an event in 2019.
