= Gintaras Jasinskas =

Lithuanian biathlete (1968–2024)

Personal information
- Nationality: Lithuanian
- Born: 28 January 1968 Kapsukas, Lithuanian SSR, USSR (now Marijampolė, Lithuania)
- Died: 26 September 2024 (aged 56)

Sport
- Sport: Biathlon

Gintaras Jasinskas (28 January 1968 – 26 September 2024) was a Lithuanian biathlete. He competed at the 1992 Winter Olympics and the 1994 Winter Olympics. Jasinskas died on 26 September 2024, at the age of 56.
