= Kazimiera Strolienė =

Lithuanian biathlete (born 1960)

Personal information
- Nationality: Lithuanian
- Born: 26 May 1960 (age 64)

Sport
- Sport: Biathlon

Kazimiera Strolienė (born 26 May 1960) is a Lithuanian biathlete. She competed at the 1992 Winter Olympics and the 1994 Winter Olympics. She also competed in four events cross-country skiing events at the 1998 Winter Olympics.
