= Ričardas Panavas =

Lithuanian cross-country skier (born 1972)

Personal information
- Nationality: Lithuanian
- Born: 1 April 1972 (age 53) Vilnius, Lithuanian SSR, Soviet Union

Sport
- Sport: Cross-country skiing

Ričardas Panavas (born 1 April 1972) is a Lithuanian cross-country skier. He competed at the 1992, 1994, 1998 and the 2002 Winter Olympics.
