= Lithuania at the 2026 Winter Olympics =

- Flag of Lithuania
- IOC code: LTU
- NOC: Lithuanian National Olympic Committee
- Website: www.ltok.lt

in Milan and Cortina d'Ampezzo, Italy 6 February 2026 – 22 February 2026
- Competitors: 17 (8 men and 9 women) in 4 sports
- Flag bearers (opening): Saulius Ambrulevičius & Allison Reed
- Flag bearers (closing): Modestas Vaičiulis & Meda Variakojytė
- Medals: Gold 0 Silver 0 Bronze 0 Total 0

Winter Olympics appearances (overview)
- 1928; 1932–1988; 1992; 1994; 1998; 2002; 2006; 2010; 2014; 2018; 2022; 2026

Other related appearances
- Soviet Union (1956–1988)

Lithuania competed at the 2026 Winter Olympics in Milan and Cortina d'Ampezzo, Italy, from 6 to 22 February 2026. Lithuania's involvement in the Winter Olympics dates back to 1928, with intermittent participation over the decades. Despite a strong tradition in summer sports, the nation has yet to secure its first Winter Olympic medal.

Figure skaters Saulius Ambrulevičius and Allison Reed were the country's flagbearer during the opening ceremony. Meanwhile, Modestas Vaičiulis and Meda Variakojytė were the country's flagbearer during the closing ceremony.

== Competitors ==
The following is the list of number of competitors participating at the Games per sport/discipline.

Sport	Men	Women	Total
Alpine skiing	1	1	2
Biathlon	4	4	8
Cross-country skiing	2	2	4
Figure skating	1	2	3
Total	8	9	17

== Alpine skiing ==
Lithuania qualified one female and one male alpine skier through the basic quota.

Athlete	Event	Run 1		Run 2		Total	
Athlete	Event	Time	Rank	Time	Rank	Time	Rank
Andrej Drukarov	Men's giant slalom	1:17.56	25	1:11.47	23	2:29.03	23
Andrej Drukarov	Men's super-G	—N/a				1:30.34	31
Andrej Drukarov	Men's slalom	1:02.41	23	1:00.03	24	2:02.44	22
Neringa Stepanauskaitė	Women's giant slalom	DNF					
Neringa Stepanauskaitė	Women's slalom	55.59	56	1:01.91	48	1:57.50	47

== Biathlon ==
Lithuania qualified four female and four male biathletes through the 2024–25 Biathlon World Cup score.

Men

Athlete	Event	Time	Misses	Rank
Nikita Čigak	Men's individual	58:22.4	1 (0+1+0+0)	50
Karol Dombrovski	Men's individual	57:00.0	1 (0+1+0+0)	30
Maksim Fomin	Men's individual	59:00.0	3 (0+1+1+1)	56
Vytautas Strolia	Men's individual	56:15.0	1 (0+0+0+1)	19
Nikita Čigak	Men's sprint	27:04.8	3 (2+1)	83
Karol Dombrovski	Men's sprint	27:07.0	3 (1+2)	84
Maksim Fomin	Men's sprint	26:19.5	2 (1+1)	71
Vytautas Strolia	Men's sprint	25:37.4	2 (1+1)	49
Vytautas Strolia	Men's pursuit	35:38.4	3 (1+1+0+1)	39
Vytautas Strolia; Karol Dombrovski; Nikita Čigak; Maksim Fomin	Team relay	1:24:40.3	0+9	15

Women

Athlete	Event	Time	Misses	Rank
Natalija Kočergina	Women's individual	54:04.2	9 (2+2+2+3)	87
Natalija Kočergina	Women's sprint	25:35.9	5 (3+2)	90
Judita Traubaitė	Women's individual	46:12.5	2 (0+1+0+1)	47
Judita Traubaitė	Women's pursuit	36:31.3	5 (1+2+1+1)	57
Judita Traubaitė	Women's sprint	23:00.2	1 (1+0)	49
Sara Urumova	Women's individual	48:04.1	3 (1+2+0+0)	77
Sara Urumova	Women's sprint	24:49.9	0 (0+0)	84
Lidija Žurauskaitė	Women's individual	49:55.2	5 (1+1+1+2)	81
Lidija Žurauskaitė	Women's sprint	23:39.9	2 (2+0)	64
Judita Traubaitė; Lidija Žurauskaitė; Natalija Kočergina; Sara Urumova	Team relay	LAP	12 (1+11)	20

Mixed

Athlete	Event	Time	Misses	Rank
Vytautas Strolia; Nikita Čigak; Judita Traubaitė; Lidija Žurauskaitė	Relay	1:11:29.1	2+16	20

== Cross-country skiing ==
Lithuania qualified one male and one female cross-country skier through the basic quota. Following the completion of the 2024–25 FIS Cross-Country World Cup, Lithuania qualified further one female and one male athlete.

Distance

Athlete	Event	Classical		Freestyle		Final		
Athlete	Event	Time	Rank	Time	Rank	Time	Deficit	Rank
Tautvydas Strolia	Men's 10 km freestyle	—N/a		25:30.0	84	—N/a		
Tautvydas Strolia	Men's 20 km skiathlon	29:11.9	70	LAP				70
Tautvydas Strolia	Men's 50 km classical	LAP	57	—N/a				
Modestas Vaičiulis	Men's 10 km freestyle	—N/a		DNF		—N/a		
Ieva Dainytė	Women's 10 km freestyle	—N/a		28:12.6	79	—N/a		
Eglė Savickaitė	Women's 10 km freestyle	—N/a		29:26.9	91	—N/a		

Sprint

Athlete	Event	Qualification		Quarterfinal		Semifinal		Final	
Athlete	Event	Time	Rank	Time	Rank	Time	Rank	Time	Rank
Tautvydas Strolia	Men's sprint	3:42.03	84	Did not advance					
Modestas Vaičiulis	Men's sprint	3:34.87	66	Did not advance					
Ieva Dainytė	Women's sprint	4:49.25	87	Did not advance					
Eglė Savickaitė	Women's sprint	4:09.61	62	Did not advance					
Tautvydas Strolia; Modestas Vaičiulis	Men's team sprint	6:17.24	21	—N/a				Did not advance	
Ieva Dainytė; Eglė Savickaitė	Women's team sprint	7:38.53	22	—N/a				Did not advance	

== Figure skating ==
In the 2025 World Figure Skating Championships in Boston, the United States, Lithuania secured one quota in each of the women's singles. Lithuania additional ice dance quota was secured during ISU Skate to Milano Figure Skating Qualifier 2025 in Beijing, China.

Athlete	Event	SP/SD		FP/FD		Total	
Athlete	Event	Points	Rank	Points	Rank	Points	Rank
Meda Variakojytė	Women's singles	53.86	27	Did not advance			
Allison Reed; Saulius Ambrulevičius	Ice dancing	82.95	7 Q	121.71	7	204.66	6

== See also ==
- Lithuania at the 2026 Winter Paralympics
