= Biathlon at the 2026 Winter Olympics – Women's relay =

Women's relay at the XXV Olympic Winter Games
- Biathlon
- Venue: Anterselva Biathlon Arena
- Date: 18 February 2026
- Competitors: 80 from 20 nations
- Teams: 20
- Winning time: 1:10:22.7

Medalists
1st place, gold medalist(s)		Camille Bened; Lou Jeanmonnot; Océane Michelon; Julia Simon	France
2nd place, silver medalist(s)		Linn Gestblom; Anna Magnusson; Elvira Öberg; Hanna Öberg	Sweden
3rd place, bronze medalist(s)		Marthe Kråkstad Johansen; Juni Arnekleiv; Karoline Offigstad Knotten; Maren Kirkeeide	Norway

The women's relay competition of the 2026 Winter Olympics was held on 18 February, at the Anterselva Biathlon Arena in Rasen-Antholz. France, represented by Camille Bened, Lou Jeanmonnot, Océane Michelon, and Julia Simon, won the event. Sweden were second and Norway third.

== Background ==
Sweden were the defending champions, and Germany were the 2022 bronze medalist. The silver medalist, Russian Olympic Committee, were barred from participation in 2026 due to the military aggression of Russia against Ukraine. Prior to the Olympics, there were four women's relay competitions in the 2025–26 Biathlon World Cup. Two were won by France, one by Norway and one by Sweden. France were the 2025 World champions.

== Results ==
The race was started at 14:45.

Rank	Bib	Country	Time	Penalties (P+S)	Deficit
1st place, gold medalist(s)	1	France; Camille Bened; Lou Jeanmonnot; Océane Michelon; Julia Simon	1:10:22.7; 18:13.3; 16:52.6; 17:11.4; 18:05.4	0+2 1+4; 0+0 1+3; 0+2 0+0; 0+0 0+1; 0+0 0+0	
2nd place, silver medalist(s)	3	Sweden; Linn Gestblom; Anna Magnusson; Elvira Öberg; Hanna Öberg	1:11:14.0; 17:17.5; 18:11.0; 17:35.7; 18:09.8	1+5 0+2; 0+1 0+1; 1+3 0+0; 0+0 0+0; 0+1 0+1	+51.3
3rd place, bronze medalist(s)	2	Norway; Marthe Kråkstad Johansen; Juni Arnekleiv; Karoline Offigstad Knotten; Maren Kirkeeide	1:11:30.3; 17:41.3; 17:39.4; 17:44.0; 18:25.6	0+2 0+5; 0+0 0+2; 0+1 0+0; 0+0 0+1; 0+1 0+2	+1:07.6
4	5	Germany; Julia Tannheimer; Franziska Preuß; Janina Hettich-Walz; Vanessa Voigt	1:11:51.8; 17:22.6; 18:29.1; 17:47.9; 18:12.2	0+1 1+8; 0+0 0+2; 0+0 1+3; 0+1 0+3; 0+0 0+0	+1:29.1
5	7	Czech Republic; Jessica Jislová; Lucie Charvátová; Tereza Voborníková; Tereza Vinklárková	1:12:30.2; 17:47.4; 17:43.8; 17:39.1; 19:19.9	1+5 0+5; 0+0 0+2; 0+1 0+2; 0+1 0+1; 1+3 0+0	+2:07.5
6	12	Poland; Anna Mąka; Kamila Żuk; Joanna Jakieła; Natalia Sidorowicz	1:12:37.5; 18:13.0; 17:35.6; 18:08.4; 18:40.5	0+1 0+11; 0+1 0+3; 0+0 0+2; 0+0 0+3; 0+0 0+3	+2:14.8
7	6	Finland; Inka Hämäläinen; Sonja Leinamo; Venla Lehtonen; Suvi Minkkinen	1:12:51.4; 17:50.6; 18:01.6; 18:30.3; 18:28.9	0+4 0+5; 0+1 0+1; 0+3 0+2; 0+0 0+1; 0+0 0+1	+2:28.7
8	10	Switzerland; Amy Baserga; Aita Gasparin; Lea Meier; Lena Häcki-Groß	1:13:10.3; 17:47.9; 18:13.5; 17:51.4; 19:17.5	0+5 1+5; 0+0 0+1; 0+2 0+0; 0+1 0+1; 0+2 1+3	+2:47.6
9	14	Ukraine; Oleksandra Merkushyna; Yuliia Dzhima; Khrystyna Dmytrenko; Daryna Chalyk	1:13:42.2; 17:34.2; 18:06.6; 18:42.5; 19:18.9	0+3 0+6; 0+1 0+2; 0+0 0+2; 0+1 0+1; 0+1 0+1	+3:19.5
10	9	Slovakia; Ema Kapustová; Paulína Bátovská Fialková; Anastasiya Kuzmina; Mária Remeňová	1:14:03.5; 18:31.1; 17:19.4; 18:25.0; 19:48.0	0+8 0+2; 0+3 0+0; 0+1 0+0; 0+1 0+0; 0+3 0+2	+3:40.8
11	4	Italy; Hannah Auchentaller; Dorothea Wierer; Michela Carrara; Lisa Vittozzi	1:14:17.4; 17:48.6; 18:17.3; 19:05.8; 19:05.7	1+5 1+8; 0+1 0+2; 1+3 0+2; 0+1 1+3; 0+0 0+1	+3:54.7
12	15	Bulgaria; Lora Hristova; Milena Todorova; Maria Zdravkova; Valentina Dimitrova	1:14:49.9; 17:23.0; 17:42.0; 19:44.2; 20:00.7	0+4 2+6; 0+0 0+0; 0+3 0+1; 0+1 2+3; 0+0 0+2	+4:27.2
13	19	Belgium; Lotte Lie; Maya Cloetens; Eve Bouvard; Marisa Emonts	1:15:06.5; 17:46.6; 17:39.4; 19:02.1; 20:38.4	0+1 0+5; 0+0 0+0; 0+0 0+1; 0+1 0+3; 0+0 0+1	+4:43.8
14	16	Estonia; Susan Külm; Regina Ermits; Tuuli Tomingas; Johanna Talihärm	1:15:12.3; 18:07.6; 18:38.1; 18:35.4; 19:51.2	0+6 0+6; 0+2 0+2; 0+1 0+1; 0+2 0+0; 0+1 0+3	+4:49.6
15	8	Austria; Tamara Steiner; Anna Gandler; Anna Andexer; Lisa Theresa Hauser	1:15:19.3; 18:43.2; 18:34.1; 18:55.9; 19:06.1	0+5 2+10; 0+0 1+3; 0+2 0+1; 0+1 1+3; 0+2 0+3	+4:56.6
16	13	Slovenia; Lena Repinc; Anamarija Lampič; Manca Caserman; Polona Klemenčič	1:15:22.1; 17:50.7; 18:35.1; 18:38.2; 20:18.1	0+1 5+11; 0+0 0+3; 0+0 2+3; 0+1 0+1; 0+0 4+3	+4:59.4
17	17	Latvia; Estere Volfa; Baiba Bendika; Sanita Buliņa; Annija Keita Sabule	1:15:59.4; 17:41.7; 17:22.6; 20:30.7; 20:24.4	2+6 1+8; 0+0 0+2; 0+1 0+1; 2+3 0+2; 0+2 1+3	+5:36.7
18	11	United States; Deedra Irwin; Lucinda Anderson; Margie Freed; Joanne Reid	1:16:49.4; 18:01.7; 19:57.7; 19:18.7; 19:31.3	1+5 2+8; 0+1 0+1; 1+3 1+3; 0+1 1+3; 0+0 0+1	+6:26.7
19	18	Canada; Pascale Paradis; Shilo Rousseau; Benita Peiffer; Nadia Moser	LAP; 19:11.3; 18:36.1	1+6 1+5; 1+3 0+0; 0+0 0+2; 0+3 1+3	
20	20	Lithuania; Judita Traubaitė; Lidija Žurauskaitė; Natalija Kočergina; Sara Urumova	LAP; 19:16.1; 19:59.7	0+6 1+5; 0+3 0+2; 0+0 1+3; 0+3 0+0	
