= Biathlon at the 2026 Winter Olympics – Women's sprint =

Women's sprint at the XXV Olympic Winter Games
- Biathlon
- Venue: Anterselva Biathlon Arena
- Date: 14 February 2026
- Competitors: 91 from 29 nations
- Winning time: 20:40.8

Medalists
| 1st place, gold medalist(s) | | Maren Kirkeeide | Norway |
| 2nd place, silver medalist(s) | | Océane Michelon | France |
| 3rd place, bronze medalist(s) | | Lou Jeanmonnot | France |

The women's sprint competition of the 2026 Winter Olympics was held on 14 February, at the Anterselva Biathlon Arena in Rasen-Antholz. Maren Kirkeeide of Norway won the event, Océane Michelon of France won the silver medal, and her teammate Lou Jeanmonnot won bronze. For Kirkeide and Michelon these were the first Olympic medals.

== Background ==
The 2022 champion, Marte Olsbu Røiseland, retired from competitions. The silver medalist, Elvira Öberg, and the bronze medalist, Dorothea Wierer, were competing. Prior to the Olympics, Lou Jeanmonnot was leading the total as well as sprint standings of the 2025–26 Biathlon World Cup. Justine Braisaz-Bouchet was the 2025 World champion.

== Results ==
The race was started at 14:45.

| Rank | Bib | Name | Country | Time | Penalties (P+S) | Deficit |
|---|---|---|---|---|---|---|
| 1st place, gold medalist(s) | 64 | Maren Kirkeeide | Norway | 20:40.8 | 0 (0+0) | |
| 2nd place, silver medalist(s) | 56 | Océane Michelon | France | 20:44.6 | 0 (0+0) | +3.8 |
| 3rd place, bronze medalist(s) | 42 | Lou Jeanmonnot | France | 21:04.5 | 1 (0+1) | +23.7 |
| 4 | 55 | Milena Todorova | Bulgaria | 21:20.8 | 1 (1+0) | +40.0 |
| 5 | 54 | Lisa Vittozzi | Italy | 21:21.4 | 0 (0+0) | +40.6 |
| 6 | 62 | Suvi Minkkinen | Finland | 21:30.4 | 0 (0+0) | +49.6 |
| 7 | 40 | Franziska Preuß | Germany | 21:40.9 | 1 (0+1) | +1:00.1 |
| 8 | 19 | Kamila Żuk | Poland | 21:50.1 | 1 (1+0) | +1:09.3 |
| 9 | 79 | Anna Andexer | Austria | 21:50.2 | 0 (0+0) | +1:09.4 |
| 10 | 57 | Ingrid Landmark Tandrevold | Norway | 21:52.6 | 2 (0+2) | +1:11.8 |
| 11 | 25 | Lora Hristova | Bulgaria | 21:54.1 | 1 (1+0) | +1:13.3 |
| 12 | 32 | Vanessa Voigt | Germany | 21:54.8 | 0 (0+0) | +1:14.0 |
| 13 | 23 | Lea Meier | Switzerland | 21:57.3 | 0 (0+0) | +1:16.5 |
| 14 | 38 | Karoline Offigstad Knotten | Norway | 22:00.0 | 0 (0+0) | +1:19.2 |
| 15 | 33 | Baiba Bendika | Latvia | 22:03.5 | 2 (0+2) | +1:22.7 |
| 16 | 27 | Estere Volfa | Latvia | 22:07.6 | 1 (0+1) | +1:26.8 |
| 16 | 71 | Anne de Besche | Denmark | 22:07.6 | 1 (0+1) | +1:26.8 |
| 18 | 52 | Hanna Öberg | Sweden | 22:07.8 | 2 (0+2) | +1:27.0 |
| 19 | 20 | Tereza Voborníková | Czech Republic | 22:09.8 | 1 (1+0) | +1:29.0 |
| 20 | 34 | Julia Tannheimer | Germany | 22:13.1 | 2 (2+0) | +1:32.3 |
| 21 | 70 | Lena Repinc | Slovenia | 22:13.6 | 0 (0+0) | +1:32.8 |
| 22 | 53 | Linn Gestblom | Sweden | 22:13.7 | 2 (0+2) | +1:32.9 |
| 23 | 61 | Michela Carrara | Italy | 22:14.3 | 2 (0+2) | +1:33.5 |
| 24 | 72 | Yuliia Dzhima | Ukraine | 22:15.4 | 0 (0+0) | +1:34.6 |
| 25 | 26 | Polona Klemenčič | Slovenia | 22:17.5 | 2 (0+2) | +1:36.7 |
| 26 | 18 | Maya Cloetens | Belgium | 22:17.8 | 0 (0+0) | +1:37.0 |
| 27 | 58 | Elvira Öberg | Sweden | 22:18.7 | 2 (0+2) | +1:37.9 |
| 28 | 77 | Joanna Jakieła | Poland | 22:21.0 | 2 (0+2) | +1:40.2 |
| 29 | 44 | Amy Baserga | Switzerland | 22:27.0 | 1 (0+1) | +1:46.2 |
| 30 | 66 | Lisa Theresa Hauser | Austria | 22:31.2 | 2 (1+1) | +1:50.4 |
| 31 | 35 | Chu Yuanmeng | China | 22:32.7 | 0 (0+0) | +1:51.9 |
| 32 | 43 | Anna Gandler | Austria | 22:35.2 | 1 (0+1) | +1:54.4 |
| 33 | 28 | Marthe Kråkstad Johansen | Norway | 22:35.3 | 2 (0+2) | +1:54.5 |
| 34 | 48 | Julia Simon | France | 22:36.6 | 2 (0+2) | +1:55.8 |
| 35 | 50 | Anna Magnusson | Sweden | 22:37.9 | 3 (2+1) | +1:57.1 |
| 36 | 29 | Anastasiya Kuzmina | Slovakia | 22:40.6 | 1 (0+1) | +1:59.8 |
| 37 | 65 | Susan Külm | Estonia | 22:43.9 | 1 (1+0) | +2:03.1 |
| 38 | 68 | Sanita Buliņa | Latvia | 22:48.2 | 0 (0+0) | +2:07.4 |
| 39 | 37 | Lotte Lie | Belgium | 22:48.8 | 1 (0+1) | +2:08.0 |
| 40 | 16 | Paulína Bátovská Fialková | Slovakia | 22:50.6 | 3 (1+2) | +2:09.8 |
| 41 | 63 | Natalia Sidorowicz | Poland | 22:50.8 | 2 (0+2) | +2:10.0 |
| 42 | 1 | Oleksandra Merkushyna | Ukraine | 22:51.8 | 1 (0+1) | +2:11.0 |
| 43 | 76 | Hannah Auchentaller | Italy | 22:52.4 | 2 (1+1) | +2:11.6 |
| 44 | 46 | Dorothea Wierer | Italy | 22:53.7 | 3 (2+1) | +2:12.9 |
| 45 | 14 | Anna Mąka | Poland | 22:55.2 | 2 (0+2) | +2:14.4 |
| 46 | 21 | Lucie Charvátová | Czech Republic | 22:55.5 | 2 (0+2) | +2:14.7 |
| 47 | 30 | Deedra Irwin | United States | 22:59.5 | 0 (0+0) | +2:18.7 |
| 48 | 12 | Meng Fanqi | China | 22:59.8 | 1 (1+0) | +2:19.0 |
| 49 | 10 | Judita Traubaitė | Lithuania | 23:00.2 | 1 (1+0) | +2:19.4 |
| 50 | 78 | Tereza Vinklárková | Czech Republic | 23:01.2 | 2 (0+2) | +2:20.4 |
| 51 | 7 | Mária Remeňová | Slovakia | 23:01.8 | 1 (1+0) | +2:21.0 |
| 52 | 36 | Selina Grotian | Germany | 23:03.4 | 3 (2+1) | +2:22.6 |
| 53 | 69 | Ema Kapustová | Slovakia | 23:03.5 | 1 (0+1) | +2:22.7 |
| 54 | 41 | Khrystyna Dmytrenko | Ukraine | 23:04.6 | 1 (1+0) | +2:23.8 |
| 55 | 11 | Aita Gasparin | Switzerland | 23:04.9 | 1 (1+0) | +2:24.1 |
| 56 | 87 | Benita Peiffer | Canada | 23:08.5 | 1 (1+0) | +2:27.7 |
| 57 | 8 | Tuuli Tomingas | Estonia | 23:14.0 | 1 (1+0) | +2:33.2 |
| 58 | 49 | Ekaterina Avvakumova | South Korea | 23:18.3 | 1 (1+0) | +2:37.5 |
| 59 | 15 | Anastasia Tolmacheva | Romania | 23:18.9 | 1 (0+1) | +2:38.1 |
| 60 | 80 | Lena Häcki-Groß | Switzerland | 23:20.3 | 4 (3+1) | +2:39.5 |
| 61 | 45 | Nadia Moser | Canada | 23:22.6 | 3 (0+3) | +2:41.8 |
| 62 | 60 | Justine Braisaz-Bouchet | France | 23:24.4 | 4 (2+2) | +2:43.6 |
| 63 | 6 | Venla Lehtonen | Finland | 23:36.1 | 2 (1+1) | +2:55.3 |
| 64 | 82 | Lidija Žurauskaitė | Lithuania | 23:39.9 | 2 (2+0) | +2:59.1 |
| 65 | 89 | Manca Caserman | Slovenia | 23:41.8 | 1 (0+1) | +3:01.0 |
| 66 | 59 | Margie Freed | United States | 23:43.2 | 3 (0+3) | +3:02.4 |
| 67 | 74 | Pascale Paradis | Canada | 23:46.7 | 3 (3+0) | +3:05.9 |
| 68 | 4 | Anika Kožica | Croatia | 23:50.6 | 0 (0+0) | +3:09.8 |
| 69 | 24 | Regina Ermits | Estonia | 23:50.9 | 2 (1+1) | +3:10.1 |
| 70 | 31 | Sonja Leinamo | Finland | 23:52.2 | 5 (3+2) | +3:11.4 |
| 71 | 5 | Annija Sabule | Latvia | 24:00.3 | 2 (1+1) | +3:19.5 |
| 72 | 9 | Joanne Reid | United States | 24:01.9 | 1 (0+1) | +3:21.1 |
| 73 | 17 | Alina Stremous | Moldova | 24:04.2 | 3 (1+2) | +3:23.4 |
| 74 | 86 | Eve Bouvard | Belgium | 24:06.3 | 2 (1+1) | +3:25.5 |
| 75 | 13 | Anna Juppe | Austria | 24:08.8 | 3 (2+1) | +3:28.0 |
| 76 | 51 | Olena Horodna | Ukraine | 24:11.3 | 2 (0+2) | +3:30.5 |
| 77 | 81 | Inka Hämäläinen | Finland | 24:21.4 | 4 (3+1) | +3:40.6 |
| 78 | 39 | Anamarija Lampič | Slovenia | 24:25.7 | 6 (3+3) | +3:44.9 |
| 79 | 67 | Lucinda Anderson | United States | 24:28.7 | 3 (0+3) | +3:47.9 |
| 80 | 2 | Shilo Rousseau | Canada | 24:32.0 | 3 (2+1) | +3:51.2 |
| 81 | 22 | Markéta Davidová | Czech Republic | 24:42.1 | 4 (3+1) | +4:01.3 |
| 82 | 73 | Johanna Talihärm | Estonia | 24:43.2 | 2 (0+2) | +4:02.4 |
| 83 | 3 | Maria Zdravkova | Bulgaria | 24:44.2 | 4 (1+3) | +4:03.4 |
| 84 | 85 | Sara Urumova | Lithuania | 24:49.9 | 0 (0+0) | +4:09.1 |
| 85 | 75 | Valentina Dimitrova | Bulgaria | 24:56.1 | 3 (2+1) | +4:15.3 |
| 86 | 47 | Ukaleq Slettemark | Denmark | 24:59.0 | 3 (1+2) | +4:18.2 |
| 87 | 91 | Darcie Morton | Australia | 25:09.8 | 3 (1+2) | +4:29.0 |
| 88 | 90 | Milana Geneva | Kazakhstan | 25:18.5 | 3 (1+2) | +4:37.7 |
| 89 | 88 | Shawna Pendry | Great Britain | 25:27.8 | 2 (1+1) | +4:47.0 |
| 90 | 84 | Natalija Kočergina | Lithuania | 25:35.9 | 5 (3+2) | +4:55.1 |
| 91 | 83 | Aisha Rakisheva | Kazakhstan | 25:52.3 | 5 (2+3) | +5:11.5 |
