= Biathlon at the 2026 Winter Olympics – Women's individual =

Women's individual at the XXV Olympic Winter Games
- Biathlon
- Venue: Anterselva Biathlon Arena
- Date: 11 February 2026
- Competitors: 90 from 29 nations
- Winning time: 41:15.6

Medalists
| 1st place, gold medalist(s) | | Julia Simon | France |
| 2nd place, silver medalist(s) | | Lou Jeanmonnot | France |
| 3rd place, bronze medalist(s) | | Lora Hristova | Bulgaria |

The women's individual competition of the 2026 Winter Olympics was held on 11 February, at the Anterselva Biathlon Arena in Rasen-Antholz. Julia Simon of France won the event, her teammate Lou Jeanmonnot was second, and Lora Hristova of Bulgaria third. For all of them, these were their first individual Olympic medals.

== Background ==
The 2022 champion, Denise Herrmann, retired from competitions, as did the silver medalist Anaïs Chevalier-Bouchet and the bronze medalist Marte Olsbu Røiseland. Prior to the Olympics, Lou Jeanmonnot was leading the total as well as individual standings of the 2025–26 Biathlon World Cup. Julia Simon was the 2025 World champion.

== Results ==
The race was started at 14:15.

| Rank | Bib | Name | Country | Time | Penalties (P+S+P+S) | Deficit |
|---|---|---|---|---|---|---|
| 1st place, gold medalist(s) | 48 | Julia Simon | France | 41:15.6 | 1 (0+1+0+0) | |
| 2nd place, silver medalist(s) | 54 | Lou Jeanmonnot | France | 42:08.7 | 2 (0+1+1+0) | +53.1 |
| 3rd place, bronze medalist(s) | 23 | Lora Hristova | Bulgaria | 42:20.1 | 0 (0+0+0+0) | +1:04.5 |
| 4 | 24 | Vanessa Voigt | Germany | 42:33.0 | 0 (0+0+0+0) | +1:17.4 |
| 5 | 42 | Dorothea Wierer | Italy | 42:49.5 | 1 (0+1+0+0) | +1:33.9 |
| 6 | 46 | Camille Bened | France | 42:52.3 | 1 (0+0+0+1) | +1:36.7 |
| 7 | 6 | Lea Meier | Switzerland | 42:53.0 | 1 (0+1+0+0) | +1:37.4 |
| 8 | 22 | Janina Hettich-Walz | Germany | 43:18.9 | 2 (1+1+0+0) | +2:03.3 |
| 9 | 64 | Linn Gestblom | Sweden | 43:28.2 | 2 (0+1+1+0) | +2:12.6 |
| 10 | 62 | Franziska Preuß | Germany | 43:35.5 | 2 (0+0+0+2) | +2:19.9 |
| 11 | 8 | Tereza Vinklárková | Czech Republic | 43:36.2 | 1 (0+1+0+0) | +2:20.6 |
| 12 | 40 | Anna Magnusson | Sweden | 43:39.9 | 2 (1+0+0+1) | +2:24.3 |
| 13 | 60 | Elvira Öberg | Sweden | 43:42.0 | 2 (1+1+0+0) | +2:26.4 |
| 14 | 21 | Alina Stremous | Moldova | 43:46.5 | 0 (0+0+0+0) | +2:30.9 |
| 15 | 18 | Tereza Voborníková | Czech Republic | 43:47.5 | 2 (0+1+0+1) | +2:31.9 |
| 16 | 20 | Marthe Kråkstad Johansen | Norway | 43:52.8 | 1 (0+0+0+1) | +2:37.2 |
| 17 | 14 | Oleksandra Merkushyna | Ukraine | 44:03.9 | 1 (0+0+0+1) | +2:48.3 |
| 18 | 45 | Khrystyna Dmytrenko | Ukraine | 44:06.1 | 1 (0+0+0+1) | +2:50.5 |
| 19 | 29 | Lotte Lie | Belgium | 44:12.8 | 1 (0+0+0+1) | +2:57.2 |
| 20 | 38 | Suvi Minkkinen | Finland | 44:16.4 | 2 (1+1+0+0) | +3:00.8 |
| 21 | 49 | Margie Freed | United States | 44:19.9 | 1 (0+1+0+0) | +3:04.3 |
| 22 | 65 | Baiba Bendika | Latvia | 44:20.8 | 4 (0+1+2+1) | +3:05.2 |
| 23 | 7 | Natalia Sidorowicz | Poland | 44:22.0 | 2 (0+1+0+1) | +3:06.4 |
| 24 | 69 | Pascale Paradis | Canada | 44:30.5 | 2 (0+1+1+0) | +3:14.9 |
| 25 | 28 | Karoline Offigstad Knotten | Norway | 44:34.1 | 2 (0+1+0+1) | +3:18.5 |
| 26 | 59 | Meng Fanqi | China | 44:37.0 | 1 (0+1+0+0) | +3:21.4 |
| 27 | 36 | Lisa Theresa Hauser | Austria | 44:37.7 | 3 (0+0+0+3) | +3:22.1 |
| 28 | 66 | Susan Külm | Estonia | 44:43.1 | 1 (1+0+0+0) | +3:27.5 |
| 29 | 80 | Sonja Leinamo | Finland | 44:44.8 | 3 (1+2+0+0) | +3:29.2 |
| 30 | 75 | Hannah Auchentaller | Italy | 44:47.4 | 2 (0+1+1+0) | +3:31.8 |
| 31 | 51 | Lucie Charvátová | Czech Republic | 44:48.0 | 3 (0+2+0+1) | +3:32.4 |
| 32 | 63 | Anna Gandler | Austria | 44:50.1 | 2 (0+2+0+0) | +3:34.5 |
| 33 | 16 | Maya Cloetens | Belgium | 44:52.1 | 2 (1+1+0+0) | +3:36.5 |
| 34 | 26 | Deedra Irwin | United States | 44:57.6 | 3 (0+1+0+2) | +3:42.0 |
| 35 | 68 | Aita Gasparin | Switzerland | 44:58.2 | 2 (0+0+0+2) | +3:42.6 |
| 36 | 57 | Estere Volfa | Latvia | 45:07.7 | 3 (1+1+0+1) | +3:52.1 |
| 37 | 50 | Lisa Vittozzi | Italy | 45:09.3 | 4 (1+1+1+1) | +3:53.7 |
| 38 | 30 | Polona Klemenčič | Slovenia | 45:09.9 | 4 (1+0+1+2) | +3:54.3 |
| 39 | 44 | Amy Baserga | Switzerland | 45:10.0 | 3 (1+1+0+1) | +3:54.4 |
| 40 | 32 | Paulína Bátovská Fialková | Slovakia | 45:18.2 | 3 (0+1+1+1) | +4:02.6 |
| 41 | 52 | Hanna Öberg | Sweden | 45:20.2 | 3 (2+0+0+1) | +4:04.6 |
| 42 | 25 | Lena Häcki-Groß | Switzerland | 45:21.0 | 3 (1+0+0+2) | +4:05.4 |
| 43 | 35 | Kamila Żuk | Poland | 45:39.3 | 4 (3+1+0+0) | +4:23.7 |
| 44 | 11 | Tamara Steiner | Austria | 46:01.1 | 2 (0+2+0+0) | +4:45.5 |
| 45 | 72 | Anna Mąka | Poland | 46:08.6 | 3 (1+1+1+0) | +4:53.0 |
| 46 | 55 | Anastasiya Kuzmina | Slovakia | 46:11.8 | 2 (0+0+1+1) | +4:56.2 |
| 47 | 87 | Judita Traubaitė | Lithuania | 46:12.5 | 2 (0+1+0+1) | +4:56.9 |
| 48 | 79 | Ema Kapustová | Slovakia | 46:14.3 | 1 (1+0+0+0) | +4:58.7 |
| 49 | 58 | Maren Kirkeeide | Norway | 46:17.7 | 5 (2+1+1+1) | +5:02.1 |
| 50 | 34 | Regina Ermits | Estonia | 46:18.6 | 2 (1+0+1+0) | +5:03.0 |
| 51 | 74 | Jessica Jislová | Czech Republic | 46:23.6 | 3 (0+0+1+2) | +5:08.0 |
| 52 | 4 | Ukaleq Slettemark | Denmark | 46:30.4 | 1 (0+0+0+1) | +5:14.8 |
| 53 | 31 | Yuliia Dzhima | Ukraine | 46:31.3 | 3 (0+0+0+3) | +5:15.7 |
| 54 | 1 | Chu Yuanmeng | China | 46:33.9 | 3 (1+1+0+1) | +5:18.3 |
| 55 | 43 | Selina Grotian | Germany | 46:39.8 | 4 (0+0+3+1) | +5:24.2 |
| 56 | 12 | Inka Hämäläinen | Finland | 46:49.5 | 3 (1+0+2+0) | +5:33.9 |
| 57 | 17 | Tuuli Tomingas | Estonia | 46:54.7 | 4 (1+1+1+1) | +5:39.1 |
| 58 | 15 | Sanita Buliņa | Latvia | 46:55.5 | 3 (1+0+1+1) | +5:39.9 |
| 59 | 33 | Milena Todorova | Bulgaria | 47:02.9 | 5 (1+2+1+1) | +5:47.3 |
| 60 | 13 | Anika Kožica | Croatia | 47:11.3 | 2 (0+0+0+2) | +5:55.7 |
| 61 | 78 | Daryna Chalyk | Ukraine | 47:14.8 | 3 (1+1+1+0) | +5:59.2 |
| 62 | 76 | Anna Andexer | Austria | 47:16.7 | 5 (1+3+0+1) | +6:01.1 |
| 63 | 41 | Ekaterina Avvakumova | South Korea | 47:18.2 | 3 (0+0+1+2) | +6:02.6 |
| 64 | 71 | Annija Sabule | Latvia | 47:21.1 | 3 (1+1+1+0) | +6:05.5 |
| 65 | 47 | Michela Carrara | Italy | 47:43.9 | 6 (2+2+0+2) | +6:28.3 |
| 66 | 67 | Joanna Jakieła | Poland | 47:52.1 | 5 (1+2+0+2) | +6:36.5 |
| 67 | 9 | Nadia Moser | Canada | 48:04.6 | 6 (1+2+2+1) | +6:49.0 |
| 68 | 70 | Joanne Reid | United States | 48:08.7 | 4 (0+2+0+2) | +6:53.1 |
| 69 | 61 | Lena Repinc | Slovenia | 48:09.3 | 6 (3+2+1+0) | +6:53.7 |
| 70 | 37 | Anne de Besche | Denmark | 48:11.8 | 4 (0+1+1+2) | +6:56.2 |
| 71 | 27 | Ingrid Landmark Tandrevold | Norway | 48:16.5 | 7 (1+4+1+1) | +7:00.9 |
| 72 | 3 | Anastasia Tolmacheva | Romania | 48:30.0 | 2 (0+1+1+0) | +7:14.4 |
| 73 | 2 | Valentina Dimitrova | Bulgaria | 48:35.8 | 2 (0+1+1+0) | +7:20.2 |
| 74 | 77 | Johanna Talihärm | Estonia | 49:01.8 | 3 (3+0+0+0) | +7:46.2 |
| 75 | 10 | Anamarija Lampič | Slovenia | 49:21.6 | 8 (4+2+1+1) | +8:06.0 |
| 76 | 73 | Maria Zdravkova | Bulgaria | 49:21.7 | 6 (1+1+1+3) | +8:06.1 |
| 77 | 83 | Sara Urumova | Lithuania | 49:45.3 | 3 (1+2+0+0) | +8:29.7 |
| 78 | 39 | Shilo Rousseau | Canada | 49:45.4 | 6 (1+2+3+0) | +8:29.8 |
| 79 | 53 | Venla Lehtonen | Finland | 49:45.5 | 5 (2+1+1+1) | +8:29.9 |
| 80 | 56 | Justine Braisaz-Bouchet | France | 49:50.2 | 8 (2+2+3+1) | +8:34.6 |
| 81 | 82 | Lidija Žurauskaitė | Lithuania | 49:55.2 | 5 (1+1+1+2) | +8:39.6 |
| 82 | 19 | Mária Remeňová | Slovakia | 50:01.7 | 6 (2+2+0+2) | +8:46.1 |
| 83 | 86 | Eve Bouvard | Belgium | 50:13.9 | 5 (0+2+2+1) | +8:58.3 |
| 84 | 5 | Luci Anderson | United States | 50:40.8 | 8 (2+1+1+4) | +9:25.2 |
| 85 | 84 | Manca Caserman | Slovenia | 51:04.9 | 6 (2+0+1+3) | +9:49.3 |
| 86 | 91 | Aisha Rakisheva | Kazakhstan | 53:52.8 | 9 (3+3+1+2) | +12:37.2 |
| 87 | 85 | Natalija Kočergina | Lithuania | 54:04.2 | 9 (2+2+2+3) | +12:48.6 |
| 88 | 88 | Shawna Pendry | Great Britain | 54:06.0 | 7 (1+1+1+4) | +12:50.4 |
| 89 | 90 | Milana Geneva | Kazakhstan | 54:22.4 | 9 (1+2+3+3) | +13:06.8 |
| 90 | 81 | Darcie Morton | Australia | 55:28.3 | 9 (3+3+2+1) | +14:12.7 |
| | 89 | Benita Peiffer | Canada | Did not start | | |
