= Lithuania at the 2022 Winter Olympics =

- Flag of Lithuania
- IOC code: LTU
- NOC: Lithuanian National Olympic Committee
- Website: www.ltok.lt

in Beijing, China 4–20 February 2022
- Competitors: 13 (8 men and 5 women) in 4 sports
- Flag bearers (opening): Deividas Kizala; Paulina Ramanauskaitė
- Flag bearer (closing): Modestas Vaiciulis
- Medals: Gold 0 Silver 0 Bronze 0 Total 0

Winter Olympics appearances (overview)
- 1928; 1932–1988; 1992; 1994; 1998; 2002; 2006; 2010; 2014; 2018; 2022; 2026

Other related appearances
- Soviet Union (1956–1988)

Lithuania competed at the 2022 Winter Olympics in Beijing, China, from 4 to 20 February 2022.

The Lithuanian team consisted of 13 athletes (eight men and five women) competing in four sports, the largest ever team Lithuania has sent to a Winter Olympics. Ice dancers Deividas Kizala and Paulina Ramanauskaitė were the country's flagbearer during the opening ceremony. Meanwhile, cross-country skier Modestas Vaiciulis was the flagbearer during the closing ceremony.

== Competitors ==
The following is the list of number of competitors participating at the Games per sport/discipline.

Sport	Men	Women	Total
Alpine skiing	1	1	2
Biathlon	4	1	5
Cross-country skiing	2	2	4
Figure skating	1	1	2
Total	8	5	13

== Calls for Olympic boycott ==
On 19 November 2021, members of the Lithuanian national parliament Seimas released an official letter encouraging Lithuania to withdrawal from the 2022 Olympics due to human rights violations in China. This came to light during the China–Lithuania relations crisis, after the Republic of China (Taipei or Taiwan) opened its representative office in Vilnius under the name of "Taiwan" (the first under this name in Europe) in August 2021. In response, the People's Republic of China recalled its ambassador in Vilnius, Shen Zhifei, and demanded that Lithuania recall its ambassador in Beijing, Diana Mickevičienė.

Trade between the two countries was seriously disrupted. Relations between the PRC and Lithuania were downgraded to the level of chargé d'affaires on 21 November 2021.

Daina Gudzinevičiūtė, president of the Lithuanian National Olympic Committee, released a statement that the Olympic Games should be politically neutral and confirmed that committee had no plans to boycott the games.

On 3 December 2021, Lithuania was the first nation to announce a diplomatic boycott of the games.

== Alpine skiing ==
By meeting the basic qualification standards Lithuania qualified one male and one female alpine skier.

Athlete	Event	Run 1		Run 2		Total	
Athlete	Event	Time	Rank	Time	Rank	Time	Rank
Andrej Drukarov	Men's giant slalom	1:05.78	20	DNF			
Andrej Drukarov	Men's slalom	DNS		Did not advance			
Gabija Šinkūnaitė	Women's slalom	DNF		Did not advance			

== Biathlon ==
Based on their Nations Cup ranking in the 2021–22 Biathlon World Cup, Lithuania qualified 4 men.

Athlete	Event	Time	Misses	Rank
Tomas Kaukėnas	Men's sprint	27:27.9	2 (1+1)	80
Tomas Kaukėnas	Men's individual	56:30.0	5 (1+0+2+2)	70
Vytautas Strolia	Men's sprint	26:22.4	2 (1+1)	43
Vytautas Strolia	Men's individual	52:10.4	1 (0+0+0+1)	21
Vytautas Strolia	Men's pursuit	48:47.8	10 (2+3+1+4)	58
Linas Banys	Men's sprint	28:05.8	3 (1+2)	90
Linas Banys	Men's individual	57:46.2	3 (1+1+0+1)	79
Karol Dombrovski	Men's sprint	27:11.2	1 (0+1)	73
Karol Dombrovski	Men's individual	56:30.1	4 (0+1+0+3)	71
Gabrielė Leščinskaitė	Women's sprint	23:37.1	0 (0+0)	63
Gabrielė Leščinskaitė	Women's individual	51:39.2	4 (1+1+0+2)	61
Karol Dombrovski; Linas Banys; Tomas Kaukėnas; Vytautas Strolia	Men's team relay	1:25:37.8	0+11	14

== Cross-country skiing ==
Lithuania has qualified the basic quotas in men's and women's events.

Distance

Athlete	Event	Total		
Athlete	Event	Time	Deficit	Rank
Tautvydas Strolia	Men's 15 km classical	46:53.1	+8:58.3	83
Eglė Savickaitė	Women's 10 km classical	38:26.5	+10:20.2	88
Ieva Dainytė	Women's 10 km classical	39:07.4	+11:01.1	90

Sprint

Athlete	Event	Qualification		Quarterfinal		Semifinal		Final	
Athlete	Event	Time	Rank	Time	Rank	Time	Rank	Time	Rank
Tautvydas Strolia	Men's sprint	3:06.76	68	Did not advance					
Modestas Vaičiulis	Men's sprint	3:01.28	49	Did not advance					
Eglė Savickaitė	Women's sprint	4:03.60	81	Did not advance					
Ieva Dainytė	Women's sprint	4:10.99	85	Did not advance					
Tautvydas Strolia; Modestas Vaičiulis	Men's team sprint	—N/a				22:17.79	12	Did not advance	24
Eglė Savickaitė; Ieva Dainytė	Women's team sprint	—N/a				LAP	14	Did not advance	=23

== Figure skating ==
In the 2021 World Figure Skating Championships in Stockholm, Sweden, Lithuania secured one quota in the ice dance competition. Allison Reed and Saulius Ambrulevičius were originally announced to represent Lithuania in the Winter Olympics; however, American-born Reed's application for Lithuanian citizenship was denied, and the pair was subsequently replaced by Paulina Ramanauskaitė and Deividas Kizala.

Athlete	Event	OD		FD		Total	
Athlete	Event	Points	Rank	Points	Rank	Points	Rank
Paulina Ramanauskaitė; Deividas Kizala	Ice dancing	58.35	23	Did not advance			
