= Amanda Lightfoot =

British biathlete (born 1987)

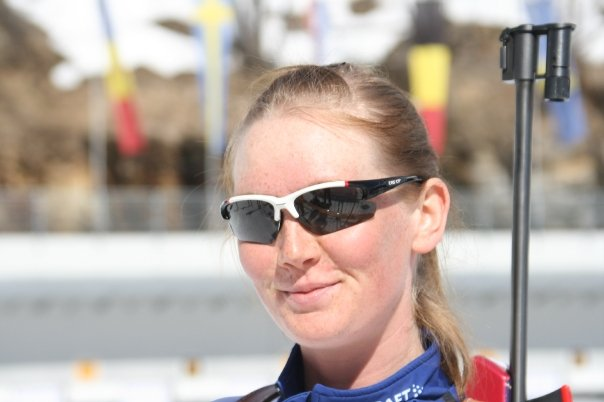
Amanda Lightfoot in 2009

Amanda Lightfoot (born 30 January 1987) is a former British biathlete who competed in many international races.

Lightfoot was born in Coventry. She took up the sport after first learning to ski at the age of nineteen. She is a Sergeant clerk in the Adjutant General's Corps. She was selected as part of the Team GB squad for the 2014 Winter Olympics in Sochi. Her trainer was Walter Pichler, and his cousin Wolfgang Pichler at some point. Lightfoot achieved a new personal best at the 2017 Biathlon World Championships in Hochfilzen when she finished 32nd in the individual race.

== Biathlon results ==
All results are sourced from the International Biathlon Union.

=== Olympic Games ===
0 medals

Event	Individual	Sprint	Pursuit	Mass start	Relay	Mixed relay
(Russia) 2014 Sochi	71st	75th	—	—	—	—
(South Korea) 2018 Pyeongchang	73rd	67th	—	—	—	—

=== World Championships ===
0 medals

Event	Individual	Sprint	Pursuit	Mass start	Relay	Mixed relay	Single mixed relay
(South Korea) 2009 Pyeongchang	104th	105th	—	—	21st	—	—
(Russia) 2011 Khanty-Mansiysk	33rd	53rd	LAP	—	19th	18th	—
(Germany) 2012 Ruhpolding	59th	36th	43rd	—	22nd	24th	—
(Czech Republic) 2013 Nové Město	95th	58th	52nd	—	—	26th	—
(Finland) 2015 Kontiolahti	66th	47th	47th	—	—	25th	—
(Norway) 2016 Oslo	48th	81st	—	—	—	—	—
(Austria) 2017 Hochfilzen	32nd	66th	—	—	—	—	—
(Italy) 2020 Rasen-Antholz	64th	90th	—	—	—	—	—
(Slovenia) 2021 Pokljuka	DNS	81st	—	—	—	—	—

*During Olympic seasons competitions are only held for those events not included in the Olympic program.
**The single mixed relay was added as an event in 2019.
