= Mikita Labastau =

Belarusian biathlete (born 1997)

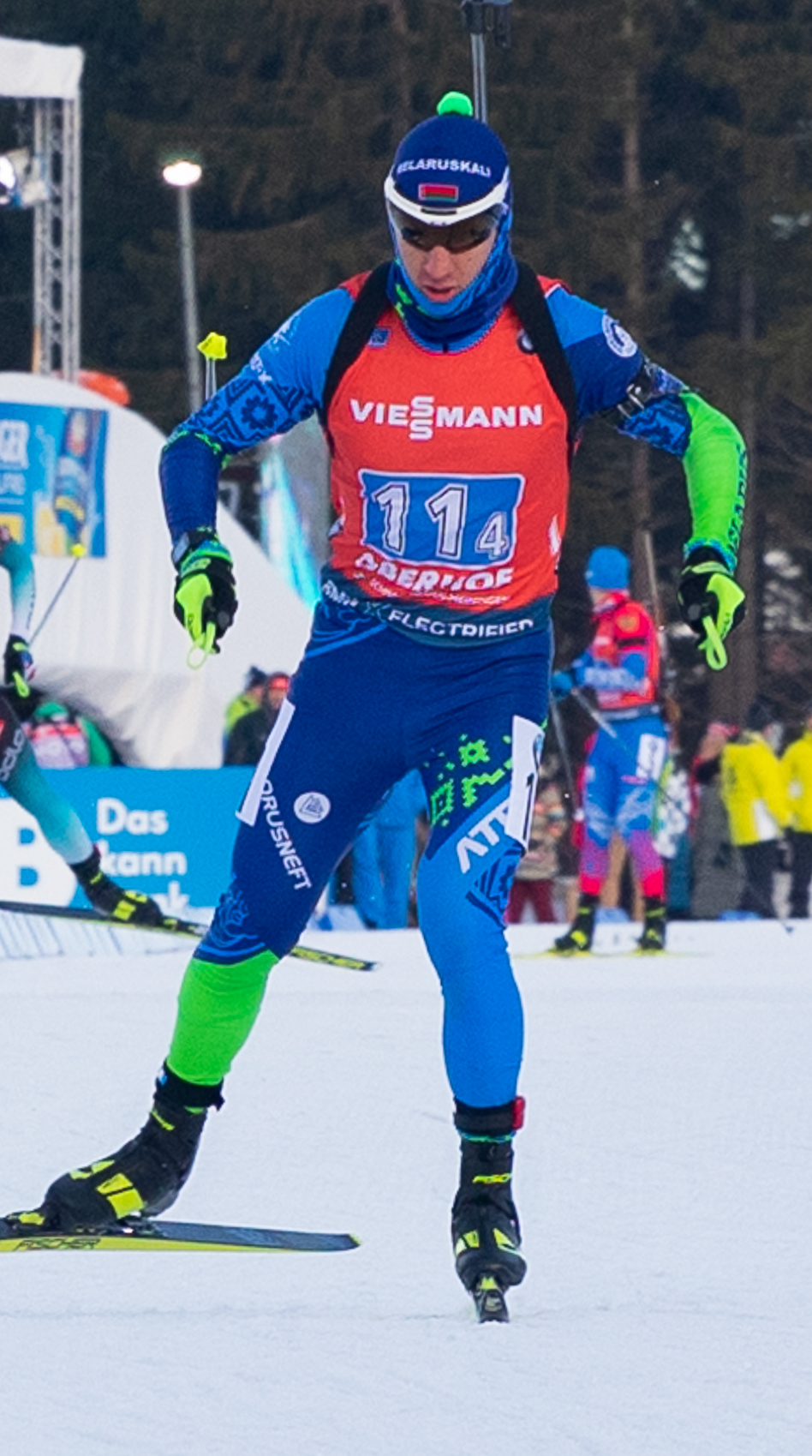
- Labastau in 2020

Personal information
- Nationality: Belarusian
- Born: 19 April 1997 (age 29) Uva, Russia

Sport
- Country: Belarus
- Sport: Biathlon
Medal record
Men's biathlon
Representing Belarus
Junior World Championships
Silver medal – second place	2019 Osrblie	15 km individual
Representing Russia
Junior World Championships
Gold medal – first place	2017 Osrblie	4 × 7.5 km relay
Bronze medal – third place	2017 Osrblie	15 km individual

Mikita Labastau (Belarusian: Мікіта Лабастаў, born 19 April 1997) is a Belarus biathlete. He has competed in the Biathlon World Cup since 2007.

== Career results ==
=== Olympic Games ===
Event	Individual	Sprint	Pursuit	Mass start	Relay	Mixed relay
(China) 2022 Beijing	47th	57th	45th	—	8th	6th

=== World Championships ===
Event	Individual	Sprint	Pursuit	Mass start	Relay	Mixed relay	Single mixed relay
(Italy) 2020 Antholz-Anterselva		36th	37th	—	9th	—	15th
(Slovenia) 2021 Pokljuka	29th	—	—	—	9th	—	12th
