= Wolfgang Pichler =

German biathlon coach

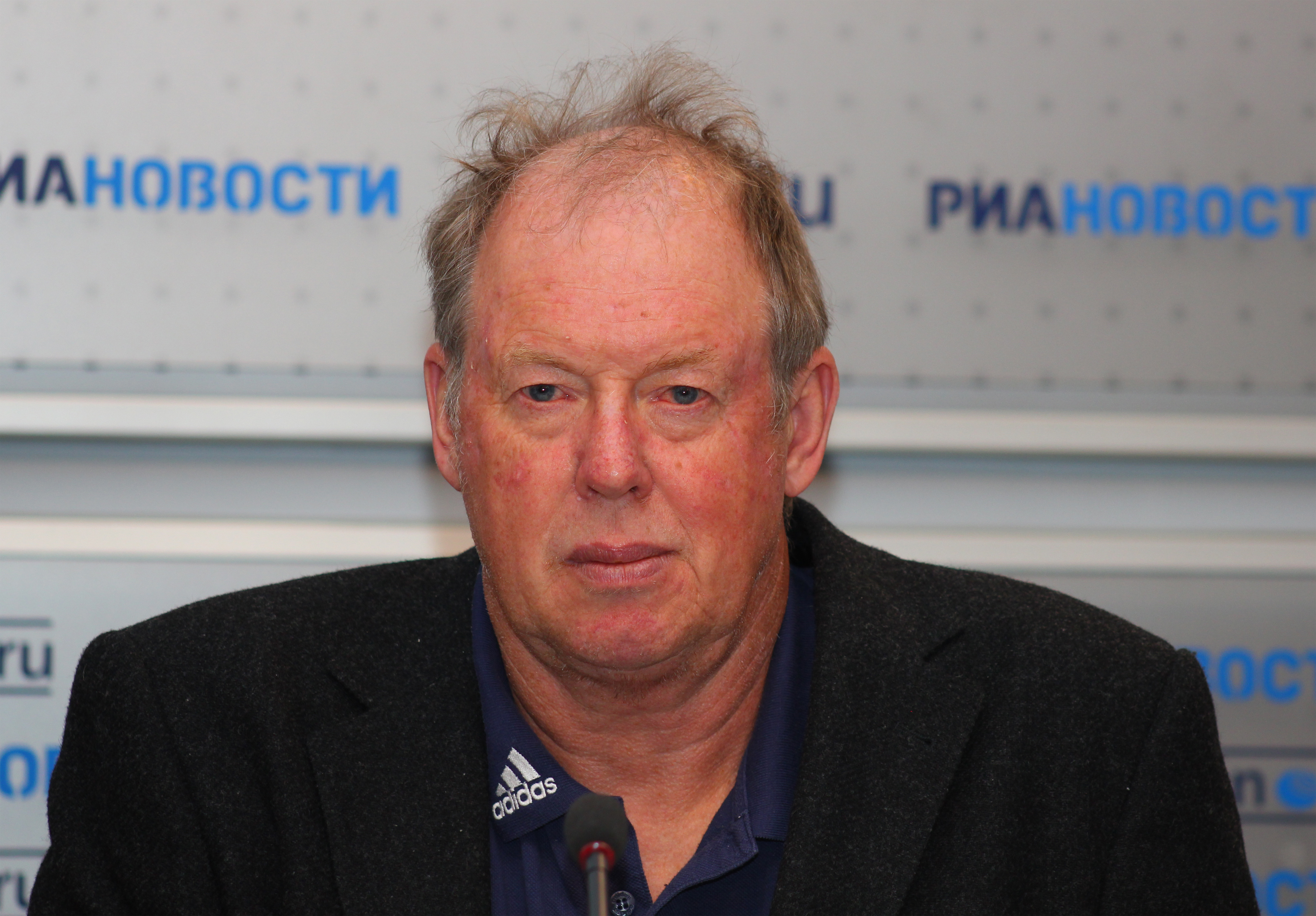
- Wolfgang Pichler in Moscow, Russia in May 2011
- Born: Ruhpolding, Bavaria, Germany; 23 January 1955
- Occupations: biathlon and cross-country skiing trainer

Wolfgang Pichler (born 23 January 1955 in Ruhpolding) is a German biathlon and cross-country skiing coach.

== Career ==
Wolfgang Pichler formerly trained Magdalena Forsberg, and won with her six World Biathlon Championships and six Biathlon World Cup titles. After her retirement, Pichler coached the Swedish biathlon team, both men and women, guiding the likes of Helena Ekholm, Anna-Carin Olofsson and Björn Ferry to Olympic and World Championship medals.

He coached Sweden at the 2006 Winter Olympics in Turin successfully. Olofsson won the silver medal in sprint behind Kati Wilhelm. She then won a gold medal in mass start, the first for Sweden since 1960.

Pichler coached the Russian female biathlon team in the season 2011/2012. After acting as a consultant to the Swedish biathlon team in the 2014–15 season, in April 2015 the Swedish Biathlon Federation announced that Pichler had been re-appointed as the team's head coach. During this spell with the team he guided Hanna Öberg and Sebastian Samuelsson to Olympic and World Championship medals. In addition at this time he coached British biathlete Amanda Lightfoot.

Wolfgang's brother, Claus Pichler, is a Social Democratic politician who was elected mayor of the brothers' home town of Ruhpolding. Walter Pichler, a fellow coach and former biathlete who took a bronze medal at the 1984 Winter Olympics, is a cousin of the brothers.

In January 2019, he announced he would resign from the position as Swedish national team coach following the 2018–2019 season.

He worked with the Bulgarian biathlon team prior to the 2026 Winter Olympic Games, where Lora Hristova won a bronze medal in the Women's Individual.
