= Lithuanian Archery Championships =

National championship in archery

Lithuanian Archery Championships (Lithuanian: Lietuvos šaudymo iš lanko čempionatas) is the national championship in archery, organized by the Lithuanian Archery Federation. The first competition was held in 1961 in Šiauliai.

== Championships ==
No	Year	Date	City	Events
1	1961	17-18 September	Šiauliai	3
2	1962	1-2 September	Palanga	3
3	1963	1-2 June	Šiauliai	3
4	1964	12-13 September	Kaunas	2
5	1965	20-22 August	Kaunas	3
6	1966	25-26 June	Šiauliai	3
7	1967	15-17 September	Kaunas	3
8	1968	14-15 September	Šiauliai	3
9	1969	11-14 September	Šiauliai	3
10	1970	2-4 July	Klaipėda	3
11	1971	9-13 June	Vilnius	3
12	1972	6-10 October	Klaipėda	5
13	1973	27-30 September	Vilnius	3
14	1974	10-11 July	Vilnius	3
15	1975	25-26 September	Vilnius	3
16	1976	20-22 September	Klaipėda	2
17	1977	16-18 July	Klaipėda	4
18	1978	13-16 July	Klaipėda	3
19	1979	30 June - 3 July	Klaipėda	2
20	1980	21-23 July	Gargždai	2
21	1981	16-19 July	Kupiškis	2
22	1982	7-10 October	Vilnius	2
23	1983	13-15 October	Klaipėda	2
24	1984	13-15 July	Klaipėda	4
25	1985	6-7 July	Kaunas	2
26	1986	26-31 August	Kaunas	2
27	1987			4
28	1988			4
29	1989		Klaipėda	4
30	1990	16-17 November	Klaipėda	4
31	1992	17-18 July	Klaipėda	4
32	2001	20 June	Klaipėda	2
33	2002	13-14 July	Klaipėda	4
34	2003	9-10 August	Klaipėda	3
35	2004	31 July - 1 August	Klaipėda	3
36	2005	30-31 July	Klaipėda	4
37	2006	29-30 July	Klaipėda	3
38	2007	27-19 July	Klaipėda	4
39	2008	26-27 July	Klaipėda	4
40	2009	3-5 July	Klaipėda	7
41	2010	5-6 July	Klaipėda	7
42	2011	12-14 August	Klaipėda	6
43	2012	25-26 August	Utena	11
44	2013	3-4 August	Utena	14
45	2014	5-6 July	Klaipėda	8
46	2015	12-14 June	Alytus	15
47	2016	12-14 August	Alytus	15
48	2017	26-27 August	Alytus	15
49	2018	21-222 July	Utena	25
50	2019	27-28 July	Utena	26
51	2020	25-26 July	Utena	28
52	2021	24-25 July	Alytus	28
