= Lithuanian Curling Association =

Lithuanian Curling Association Lithuanian: Lietuvos kerlingo asociacija
- Sport: Curling
- Category: National association
- Abbreviation: LKA
- Founded: 2002
- Affiliation: WCF; LTOK
- Headquarters: Vilnius, Lithuania
- President: Vygantas Zalieckas

Official website
- www.curling.lt

Lithuanian Curling Association (Lithuanian: Lietuvos kerlingo asociacija) is a national governing body of curling sport in Lithuania.

In 2005 Lithuanian Curling Association become part of World Curling Federation.
