= Lithuanian Archery Federation =

Lithuanian Archery Federation Lithuanian: Lietuvos lankininkų federacija
- Sport: Archery
- Category: National association
- Abbreviation: LLF
- Founded: 1965
- Affiliation: WAF; LTOK
- Affiliation date: 1999
- Headquarters: Vilnius, Lithuania
- President: Gediminas Maksimavičius

Official website
- archery.lt

Lithuanian Archery Federation (Lithuanian: Lietuvos lankininkų federacija) is a national governing body of archery sport in Lithuania.

Federation also organising annual national Lithuanian Archery Championships.

== Structure ==
As of 2020:

- President: Gediminas Maksimavičius
- General Secretary: Laura Urvakytė-Stankevičienė
