= Otto Invenius =

Finnish biathlete (born 2000)

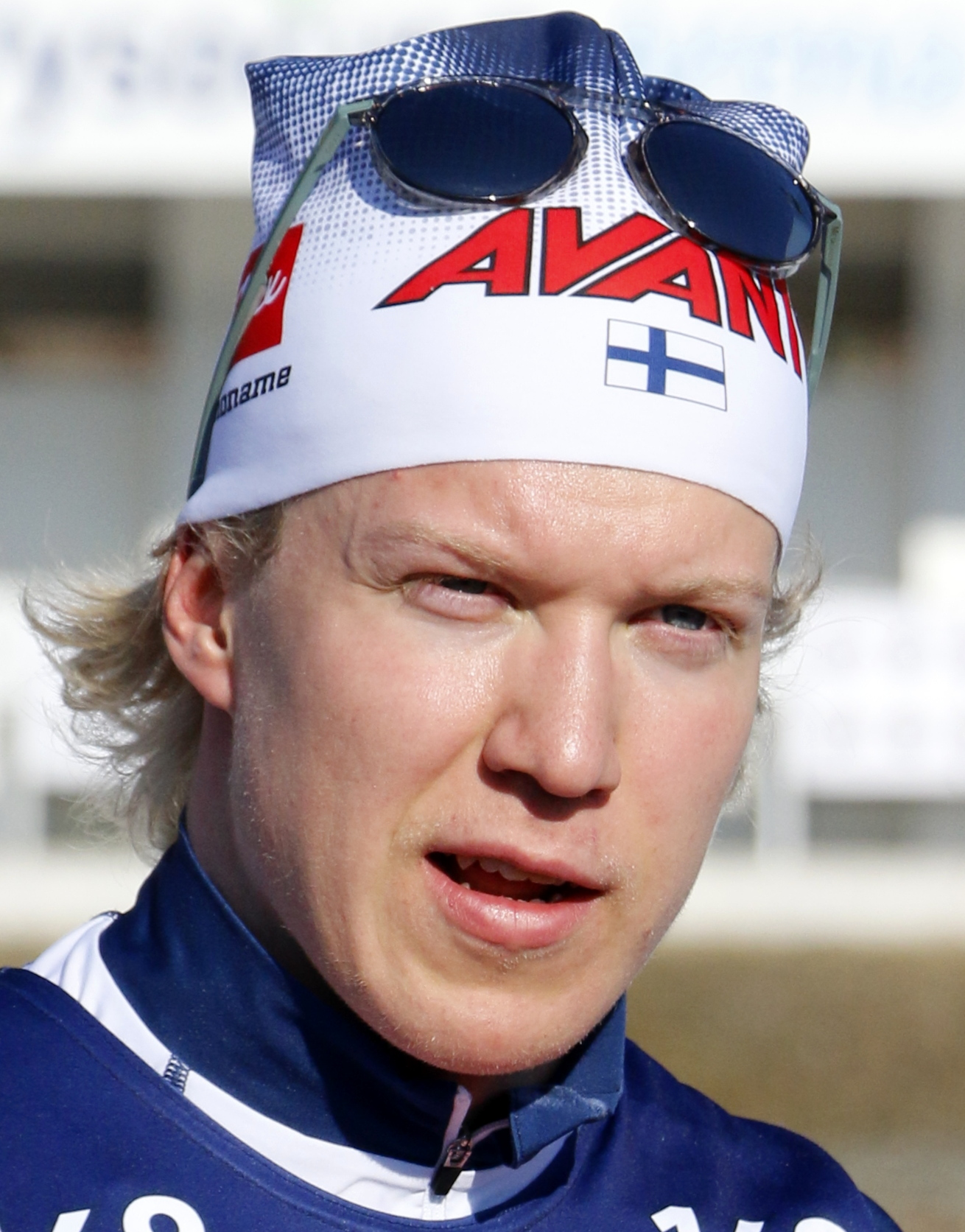
- Invenius in 2023

Personal information
- Nationality: Finnish
- Born: 9 December 2000 (age 25) Leppävirta, Finland

Sport
- Country: Finland
- Sport: Biathlon

Otto Invenius (born 9 December 2000) is a Finnish biathlete. He has competed in the Biathlon World Cup since 2022.

== Career ==
Otto Invenius participated in his first Youth World Championships in 2017 and 2018. He won his first international medal at the 2017 Olympic Youth Festival in Erzurum, Turkey, where he, along with Jenni and Maija Keränen and Santtu Panttila, secured bronze in the mixed relay. At the start of the 2018/19 season, he made his debut in the IBU Cup for seniors at the age of 17 in Idre, immediately achieving 10th place in his second sprint race despite a shooting miss. In the 2019 Youth World Championship sprint, he won the bronze medal behind Slovenians Alex Cisar and Lovro Planko, finishing in the top ten in the other events as well. In the winters of 2019/20 and 2020/21, Invenius did not compete in many races but participated in his first European Championships in 2020. During the 2021/22 season he won three silver medals at the Junior European and World Championships after the New Year, finishing behind Jonáš Mareček, Paul Fontaine, and Martin Nevland. As a result, he earned his first World Cup appearance at the season finale in Oslo and completed the pursuit race, finishing 48th.

In the winter of 2022/23, Invenius joined the national team but mainly competed in the IBU Cup, achieving three top-20 results. In the Ruhpolding World Cup weekend, he replaced the ill Tero Seppälä and finished 75th in the individual race. As the anchor leg in the relay, following Tuomas Harjula, Olli Hiidensalo, and Jaakko Ranta in fourth position, he incurred a penalty lap in the prone position but finished 8th. In the last trimester, he participated in the World Cup, coming 23rd in Nové Město in the sprint, despite two shooting misses. In Oslo he finishing 12th in the sprint and 22nd in the pursuit, qualifying for his first mass start, which he completed in 27th place. Invenius debuted at the World Championships in 2024 in Nové Město.

Invenius achieved his first top-level podium finish at Oslo's Holmenkollen during the 2023/24 season, securing third place in the mixed relay alongside Suvi Minkkinen.

== Biathlon results ==
All results are sourced from the International Biathlon Union.

=== World Championships ===
Event	Individual	Sprint	Pursuit	Mass start	Relay	Mixed relay	Single mixed relay
(Czech Republic) 2024 Nové Město	48th	54th	34th	—	8th	20th	12th

=== World Cup ===
==== Relay podiums ====
No.	Season	Date	Location	Level	Race	Place	Teammate
1	2023–24	3 March 2024	(Norway) Oslo Holmenkollen	World Cup	Single Mixed Relay	3rd	Suvi Minkkinen
