= Biathlon at the 2017 European Youth Olympic Winter Festival =

Biathlon at the 2017 European Youth Winter Olympic Festival is held from 13 to 17 February 2017 at the Kandilli Ski Resort in Erzurum, Turkey.

== Medal table ==
Rank	Nation	Gold	Silver	Bronze	Total
1	France (FRA)	2	2	1	5
2	Russia (RUS)	2	1	3	6
3	Czech Republic (CZE)	1	0	0	1
4	Estonia (EST)	0	1	0	1
4	Ukraine (UKR)	0	1	0	1
6	Finland (FIN)	0	0	1	1
Totals (6 entries)		5	5	5	15

== Medal summary ==
=== Boys events ===
Event	Gold		Silver		Bronze	
7.5 km Sprint	Vítězslav Hornig (CZE)	19:46.9 (0+0)	Kristo Siimer (EST)	20:02.4 (1+0)	Mikhail Pervushin (RUS)	20:02.7 (1+1)
10 km Pursuit	Thomas Briffaz (FRA)	28:45.9 (2+0+1+0)	Jason Drezet (FRA)	28:48.9 (1+0+1+1)	Andrei Viukhin (RUS)	28:49.1 (0+2+2+2)

=== Ladies events ===
Event	Gold		Silver		Bronze	
6 km Sprint	Camille Bened (FRA)	17:42.2 (1+0)	Khrystyna Dmytrenko (UKR)	18:03.7 (0+1)	Anastasia Shevchenko (RUS)	18:04.1 (2+0)
7.5 km Pursuit	Anna Grigoreva (RUS)	24:45.8 (1+1+0+1)	Anastasia Shevchenko (RUS)	25:22.9 (0+1+3+0)	Camille Bened (FRA)	26:21.8 (3+1+2+0)

=== Mixed events ===
Event	Gold		Silver		Bronze	
Relay	Russia; Anna Grigoreva; Anastasia Shevchenko; Andrei Viukhin; Mikhail Pervushin	1:16:39.3 (0+2) (0+1) (0+3) (0+1) (0+0) (0+3) (0+1) (0+0)	France; Sophie Chauveau; Camille Bened; Jason Drezet; Thomas Briffaz	1:17:28.3 (0+1) (2+3) (0+0) (0+1) (0+2) (0+1) (0+0) (0+1)	Finland; Jenni Keränen; Maija Keränen; Otto Invenius; Santtu Panttila	1:18:37.2 (0+0) (0+0) (0+2) (0+0) (0+2) (1+3) (0+0) (0+1)
