= Lithuanian Biathlon Federation =

Sports governing body in Lithuania

Lithuanian Biathlon Federation Lithuanian: Lietuvos biatlono federacija
- Sport: Biathlon
- Category: National association
- Abbreviation: LBF
- Founded: 1995
- Affiliation: IBU; LTOK
- Headquarters: Vilnius, Lithuania
- President: Arūnas Daugirdas

Official website
- biathlonltu.com

Lithuanian Biathlon Federation (Lithuanian: Lietuvos biatlono federacija) is a national governing body of biathlon sport in Lithuania.

Federation also organising annual national Lithuanian Biathlon Championships.

== Structure ==
As of 2021:

- President: Arūnas Daugirdas
- General Secretary: Ričardas Griaznovas
