= Lithuanian National Olympic Committee =

- Country: Lithuania
- [[|]]
- Code: LTU
- Created: 1924
- Recognized: 1924 (officially restored: November 1991)
- Continental Association: EOC
- Headquarters: Vilnius, Lithuania
- President: Daina Gudzinevičiūtė
- Secretary General: Mindaugas Griškonis
- Website: www.ltok.lt

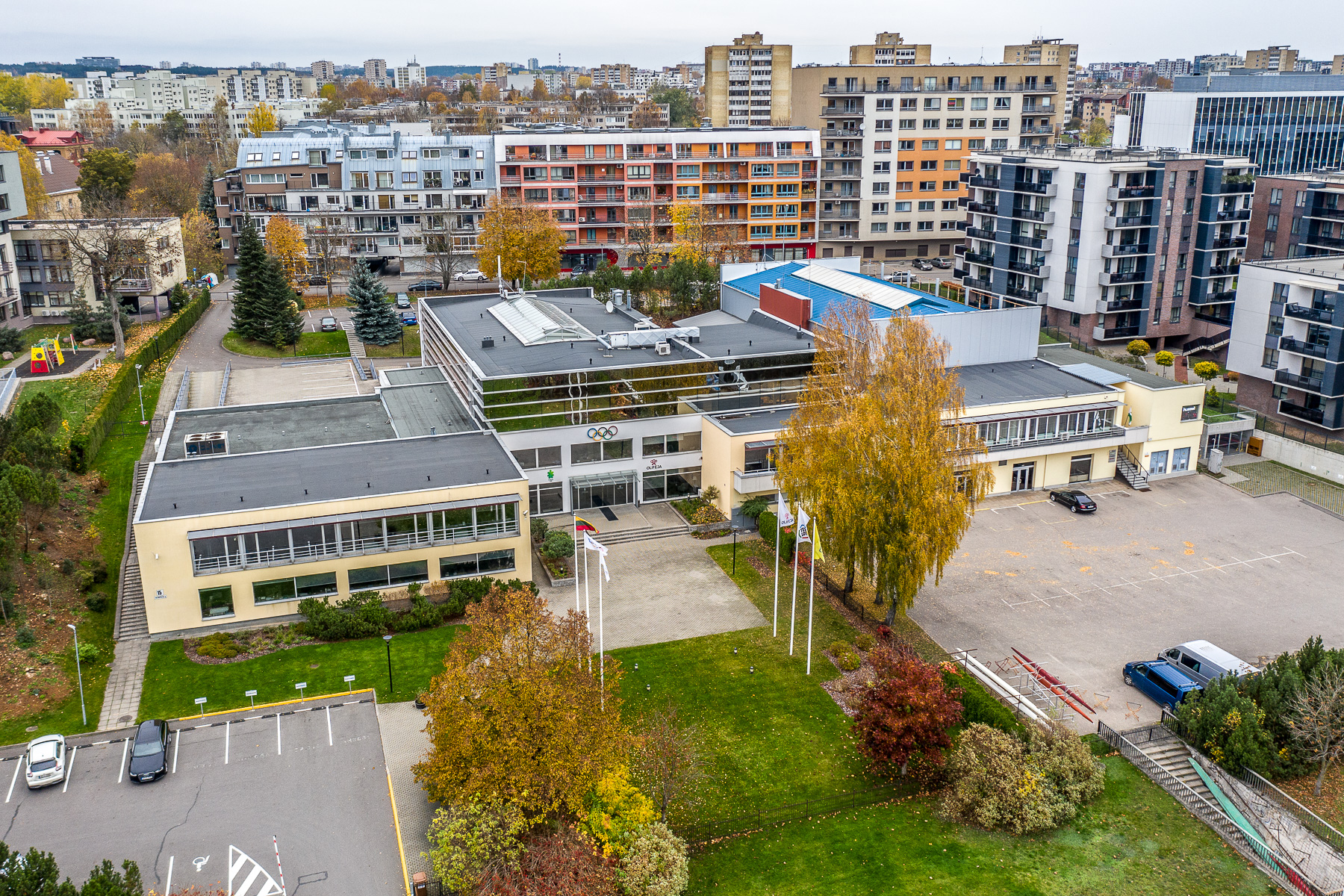
Headquarters of the Lithuanian National Olympic Committee

The Lithuanian National Olympic Committee (Lithuanian: Lietuvos tautinis olimpinis komitetas, LTOK; IOC Code: LTU) is the National Olympic Committee representing Lithuania.

== History ==
Lithuania's national Olympic committee was established and recognized in 1924. In the same year LTOK sent its first delegation to the 1924 Summer Olympics. During Soviet Union occupation time LTOK was disestablished. At 1988 movement for freedom times there was offered to restore national committee. On October 10, 1988 LSSR physical education and sport organization created a special group to reestablish National Olympic Committee of Lithuania. Group chairman become Artūras Poviliūnas. At same year December 11 in Vilnius was held delegates session in which LTOK was restored, and Artūras Poviliūnas was elected its president. LTOK delegates on February 15, 1990, in Lausanne met IOC spokesman. Following the Act of the Re-Establishment of the State of Lithuania on March 11, the republic withdrew its athletes from all Soviet national competitions. Lithuania attempted to first compete on its own at the 1990 Goodwill Games that would be contested from July to August, but the request was rejected and an attempt to make the athletes carry the republic's flag during welcoming ceremonies and wear patches on their Soviet uniforms bearing the Lithuanian insignia was not accepted by the LTOK. Only four Lithuanian athletes accepted to play for the USSR at the Goodwill Games.

In a 1991 IOC meeting at Berlin, the National Olympic Committee of Lithuania was officially recognized. Lithuania was along with Baltic neighbors Latvia and Estonia one of the first parts of the former USSR to participate as an independent country.

== Participating incidents ==
- In the 1932 Summer Olympics in Los Angeles, Lithuania did not participate due to economic difficulties and political controversies surrounding the National Olympic Committee.
- In the 1936 Summer Olympics in Berlin, Lithuania was not invited by Nazi Germany due to the Klaipėda/Memelland region controversy.
- On 19 November 2021, a group of 17 members of Lithuanian national parliament Seimas released an official letter encouraging Lithuania to withdraw from the 2022 Winter Olympics due to human rights violations in China. Daina Gudzinevičiūtė, president of National Olympic Committee of Lithuania, released a statement that Olympic games should be politically neutral and confirmed that committee has no plans to boycott the games. On 3 December 2021, Lithuania was the first nation to announce a diplomatic boycott of the games.

== Current NOC Leadership ==
=== President ===
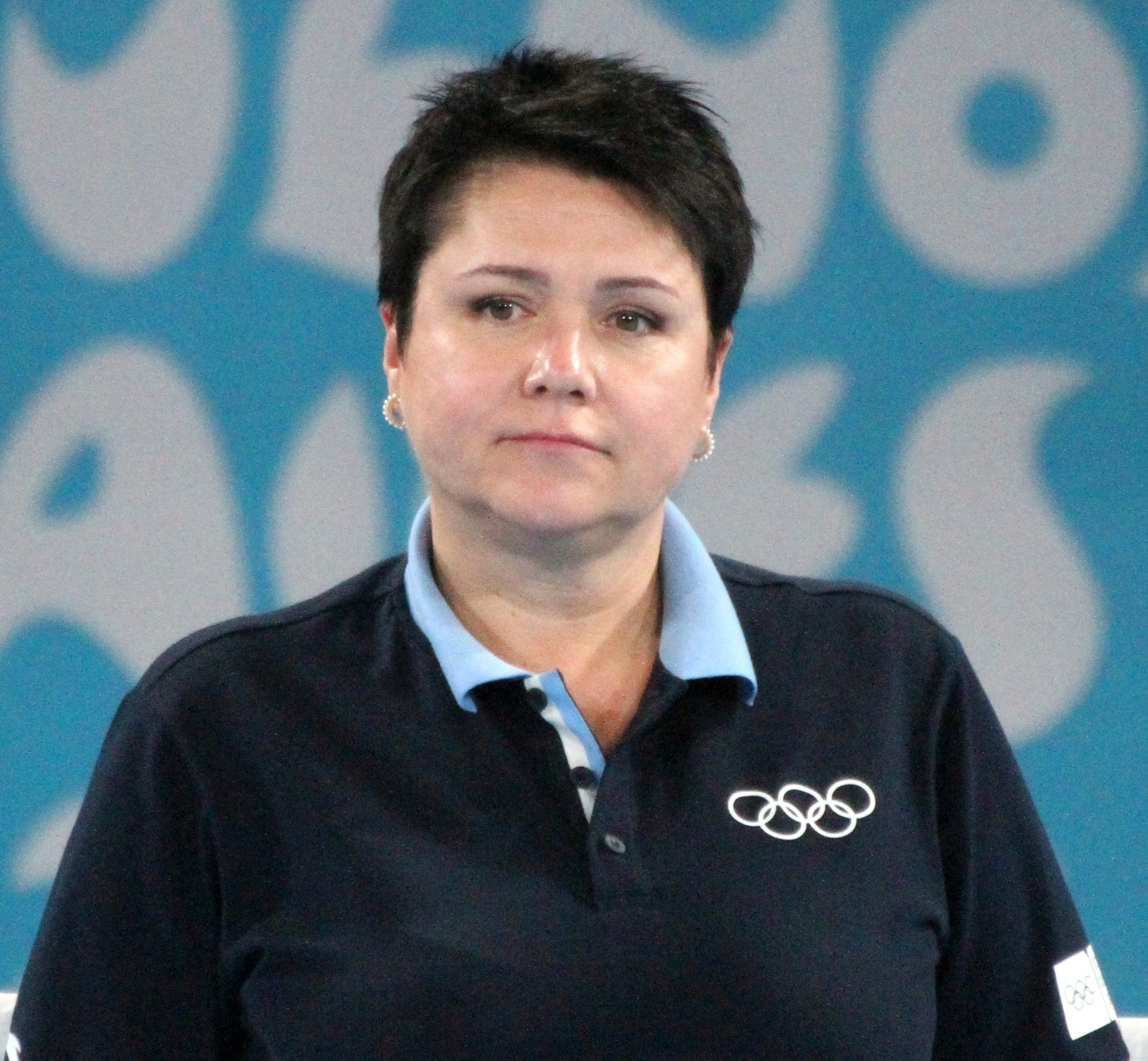
Daina Gudzinevičiūtė, president of NOC since 2012

- Artūras Poviliūnas (1988–2012)
- Daina Gudzinevičiūtė (2012–present)

=== Vice presidents ===
- Darius Šaluga
- Inga Navickienė
- Gintaras Jasiūnas

=== Secretary General ===
- Mindaugas Griškonis

=== Treasurer ===
- Darius Čerka

== Members ==
LTOK has 40 full time members, 3 approved observers and 12 Olympic-friendly unions:

Full time members (40)

Member	Sports
Lithuanian Swimming Federation	Diving, Swimming, Artistic Swimming, Open Water Swimming
Lithuanian Archery Federation	Archery
Athletics Federation of Lithuania	Athletics
Lithuanian Badminton Federation	Badminton
Lithuanian Basketball Federation	Basketball
Lithuanian Boxing Federation	Boxing
Lithuanian Canoeing Federation	Canoeing (spring, slalom)
Lithuanian Cycling Federation	Cycling (track, BMX, road, MTB)
Lithuanian Equestrian Federation	Equestrian
Lithuanian Fencing Federation	Fencing
Lithuanian Field Hockey Federation	Field hockey
Lithuanian Football Federation	Football
Lithuanian Golf Federation	Golf
Lithuanian Gymnastics Federation	Gymnastics (Artistic, Rhythmic, Trampoline, Aerobics, Acrobatics)
Lithuanian Handball Federation	Handball
Lithuanian Judo Federation	Judo
Lithuanian Modern Pentathlon Federation	Modern pentathlon
Lithuanian Rugby Federation	Rugby union, Rugby 7's
Lithuanian Rowing Federation	Rowing
Lithuanian Sailors Union	Sailing
Lithuanian Sport Shooting Union	Shooting
Lithuanian Table Tennis Association	Table tennis
Lithuanian Taekwondo Federation	Taekwondo
Lithuanian Tennis Association	Tennis
Lithuanian Triathlon Federation	Triathlon
Lithuanian Volleyball Federation	Volleyball, Beach Volleyball
Lithuanian Water Polo Federation	Water Polo
Lithuanian Weightlifting Federation	Weightlifting
Lithuanian Wrestling Federation	Wrestling
Lithuanian Biathlon Federation	Biathlon
Lithuanian Curling Association	Curling
Lithuanian Skating Federation	Figure Skating
Lithuanian Ice Hockey Federation	Ice hockey
Lithuanian Speed Skating Association	Short Track Speed Skating
National Skiing Association of Lithuania	Alpine skiing, Cross-county skiing, Freestyle skiing, Snowboarding
Lithuanian Surfing Association	Surfing, Standup paddleboarding
Lithuanian Karate Federation	Karate
Lithuanian Baseball Association	Baseball
Lithuanian Skateboarding Federation	Skateboarding
Lithuanian Sport Climbing Association	Sport Climbing

Approved observers (3)

Member	Sports
Lithuanian Chess Federation	Chess
Lithuanian Dance Sport Federation	Dance sport
Lithuanian Orienteering Federation	Orienteering

Olympic-friendly unions (12)

Member
Lithuanian Aero Club
Association Sportas visiems
Lithuanian Association of Olympians
Lithuanian Olympic Academy
Lithuanian Paralympic Committee
Union of Lithuanian Sport Federations
Lithuanian Sports Medicine Federation
Lithuanian Sport Masters Association Penki žiedai
Lithuanian Students Sport Association
Lithuanian Municipalities Sports Education Managers Association
Lithuanian Municipalities Sports Establishments Managers Association
Lithuanian Sports Journalists Federation

Olympic sport federations not part of LTOK: Lithuanian Bobsleigh and Skeleton Federation, Lithuanian Luge Federation, Lithuanian Softball Federation

== See also ==
- Lithuania at the Olympics
