= Camille Bened =

French biathlete (born 2000)

Personal information
- Nationality: French
- Born: 6 September 2000 (age 25) Évian-les-Bains, France

Sport
- Country: France
- Sport: Biathlon
Medal record
Women's biathlon
Representing France
Olympic Games
Gold medal – first place	2026 Milano Cortina	4 × 6 km relay
European Championships
Silver medal – second place	2024 Osrblie	Mixed relay
Silver medal – second place	2025 Val Martello	4 × 6 km relay
Junior World Championships
Gold medal – first place	2018 Otepää	4 × 6 km relay
Gold medal – first place	2019 Osrblie	4 × 6 km relay
Gold medal – first place	2020 Lenzerheide	4 × 6 km relay
Gold medal – first place	2021 Obertilliach	4 × 6 km relay
Gold medal – first place	2021 Obertilliach	12.5 km Individual

Camille Bened (born 6 September 2000) is a French biathlete. She is the 2026 Olympic Champion in relay.

== Career ==
Camille Bened competed exclusively in junior-level events from 2016 to 2019. She made her debut in the IBU Junior Cup in December 2016 in Lenzerheide and celebrated her first victory with the relay team during the same season. In February 2017, she emerged as one of the most successful athletes at the European Youth Olympic Festival, winning a gold, silver, and bronze medal. The following winter, she achieved two individual podium finishes and, alongside Myrtille Bègue and Lou Jeanmonnot, secured the relay gold at the Youth World Championships. In December 2018, Bened won her first individual Junior Cup race and defended the relay title at the Youth World Championships with Jeanmonnot and Sophie Chauveau. At the 2019 Junior European Championships, she achieved victories in the individual and sprint races thanks to her flawless shooting.

At the start of the 2019/20 season, Bened made her debut in the IBU Cup, finishing in the top 10 in her third race, the pursuit in Sjusjøen. She again claimed relay gold at the Junior World Championships, this time with Laura Boucaud, Lou Anne Chevat, and Paula Botet. Her best results at her first European Championships were 25th in the super sprint and 7th in the mixed relay. In January 2021, she reached her first individual IBU Cup podium with a third-place finish in Arber behind Russians Tatiana Akimova and Anastasia Shevchenko. Shortly after, she placed second with the mixed relay team. At the Junior World Championships, Bened won another relay gold and achieved her first and only individual title by winning the individual race. During the 2021/22 season, Bened placed in the top ten in individual races seven times, finishing fifth in the overall standings. She secured her first IBU Cup sprint victory in Osrblie and ended the season with another win in Ridnaun with the mixed relay. In the 2022/23 season, she again finished in the top ten eight times but only managed a single podium finish with the mixed relay, taking third place in Canmore. In January 2024, Bened won her first European Championships medal, claiming silver in the mixed relay alongside Théo Guiraud-Poillot, Antonin Guigonnat, and Océane Michelon, finishing behind the Norwegian team. That same winter, she secured three more IBU Cup podium finishes, narrowly missing a sprint victory in Arber in early February due to a shooting miss.

== Biathlon results ==
All results are sourced from the International Biathlon Union.

=== Olympic Games ===
1 medals: 4 x 6 km relay (gold)

Event	Individual	Sprint	Pursuit	Mass start	Relay	Mixed relay
(Italy) 2026 Milano-Cortina	6th	—	—	—	Gold	—

==== Individual podiums ====
No.	Season	Date	Location	Level	Race	Place
1	2025–26	2 December 2025	(Sweden) Östersund	World Cup	Individual	3rd
2	2025–26	18 January 2026	(Germany) Ruhpolding	World Cup	Pursuit	3rd

=== Youth and Junior World Championships ===
5 medals (5 gold)

Year	Age	Individual	Sprint	Pursuit	Relay
(Estonia) 2018 Otepää	18	27th	43rd	31st	Gold
(Slovakia) 2019 Brezno-Osrblie	19	6th	7th	12th	Gold
(Switzerland) 2020 Lenzerheide	20	7th	17th	5th	Gold
(Austria) 2021 Obertilliach	21	Gold	4th	4th	Gold
