= Lithuanian Bobsleigh and Skeleton Federation =

Federation of Bobsleigh and Skeleton events in Lithuania

Lithuanian Luge Federation Lithuanian: Lietuvos bobslėjaus ir skeletono sporto federacija
- Sport: Bobsleigh; Skeleton
- Category: National association
- Abbreviation: LBSSF
- Founded: 2013
- Affiliation: IBSF
- Headquarters: Vilnius, Lithuania
- President: Vitalijus Svedas

Lithuanian Bobsleigh and Skeleton Federation (Lithuanian: Lietuvos bobslėjaus ir skeletono sporto federacija) is a national governing body of bobsleigh and skeleton sports in Lithuania.

== History ==
Lithuanian Bobsleigh and Skeleton Federation was founded in December 2013 at Vilnius, Lithuania.

Federation become a member of International Bobsleigh and Skeleton Federation.
