= Walter Pichler (biathlete) =

German biathlete

Olympic medal record

Men's Biathlon
Bronze medal – third place	1984 Sarajevo	4 x 7.5 km relay

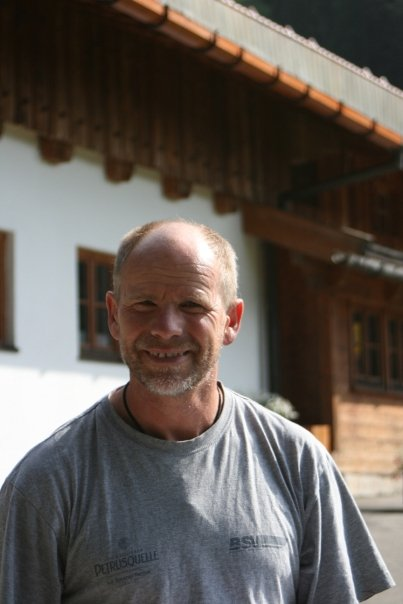
Walter Pichler

Walter Georg Pichler (born 23 October 1959) is a former German biathlete from Bad Reichenhall, who represented West Germany. At the 1984 Winter Olympics in Sarajevo, Pichler won a bronze medal with the West German relay team consisting of Peter Angerer, Ernst Reiter and Fritz Fischer.

Walter Pichler is the cousin of biathlon coach Wolfgang Pichler. He served as coach of the United States national biathlon team from 1989. He was appointed as head coach of the British biathlon team in May 2008.
