= Marisa Emonts =

French-Belgian biathlete (born 2002)

Personal information
- Nationality: Belgium
- Citizenship: Germany
- Born: 18 November 2005 (age 20) Munich, Germany

Sport

Professional information
- Sport: Biathlon

World Championships
- Teams: 1 (2025)

Marisa Emonts (born November 18, 2005, in Munich) is a Belgian-German biathlete. She is the daughter of Ralph Emonts, a Belgian athlete who competed in the IBU Cup in the late 2010s. Ralph Emonts, originally from Kelmis in the German-speaking part of Belgium, moved his family for work reasons to Bavaria, Germany where his daughter was born and now trains in Ruhpolding. After two appearances at the Biathlon Youth World Championships in 2021 and 2022, she switched to the German federation but after failing to secure international selection with her birth country, turned back to continue to represent Belgium internationally. She represented Belgium at the 2026 Winter Olympics as a member of the first ever Belgian women's biathlon relay at the Games.

== Biathlon results ==
=== Olympic Games ===
0 medals

Event	Individual	Sprint	Pursuit	Mass start	Relay	Mixed relay
Representing Belgium
(Italy) 2026 Milano Cortina	—	—	—	—	13th	—

=== World Championships ===
0 medals

Event	Individual	Sprint	Pursuit	Mass start	Relay	Mixed relay	Single mixed relay
Representing Belgium
(Switzerland) 2025 Lenzerheide	—	—	—	—	13th	—	—

=== Youth and Junior World Championships ===
0 medals

Year	Age	Individual	Sprint	Mass start	Pursuit	Relay
Representing Belgium
(Germany) 2026 Arber	20	21st	13th	40th	Not held	—
(Kazakhstan) 2025 Östersund	19	27th	61st	Not held	49th	—
(United States) 2022 Soldier Hollow	16	25th	40th	Not held	43rd	14th
(Austria) 2021 Obertilliach	15	50th	67th	Not held	—	20th
