= Eglė Savickaitė =

Lithuanian cross-country skier (born 2004)

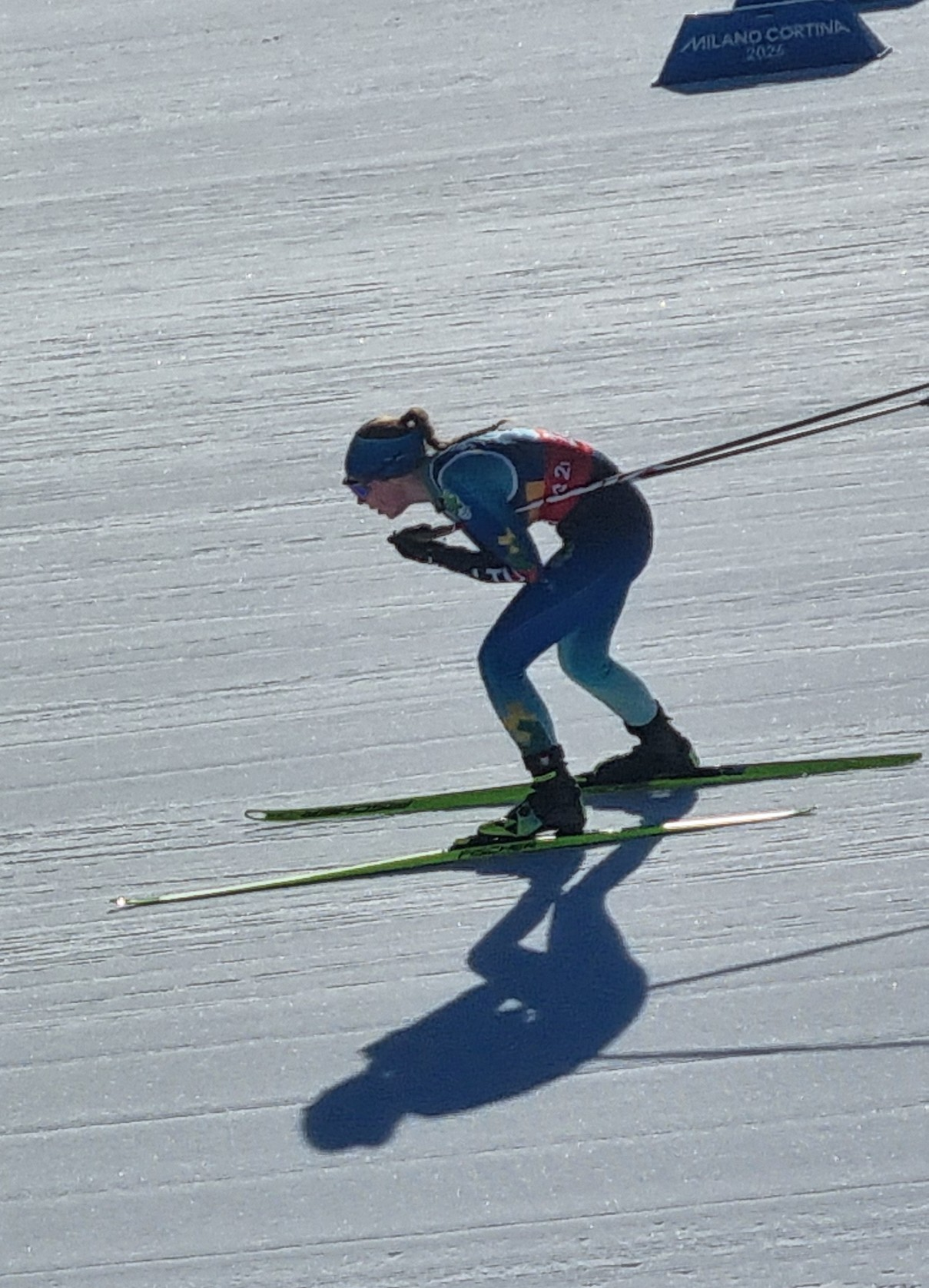
- 2026 Winter Olympics

Personal information
- Born: 5 November 2004 (age 21) Anykščiai, Lithuania

Sport
- Country: Lithuania
- Sport: Cross-country skiing
- Catches: Algis Drūsis
- Club: SK Viesulas

Eglė Savickaitė (born 5 November 2004) is a Lithuanian cross-country skier.

== Biography ==
=== 2020 Winter Youth Olympics ===
Savickaitė was selected to represent Lithuania at the 2020 Winter Youth Olympics.

=== 2021 World Championships ===
Savickaitė represented Lithuania at the FIS Nordic World Ski Championships 2021. She finished 81st in women's sprint, failed to qualify for individual 10 km race and was part of Lithuania's relay and sprint teams.

In pair with Ieva Dainytė, Savickaitė participated in women's team sprint competition. Lithuanian pair finished 26th overall and failed to qualify for the final. Savickaitė was a part of Lithuanian national relay team that was ranked in 15th place.

=== 2022 Olympics ===
Savickaitė was selected to represent Lithuania at the 2022 Winter Olympics. She finished 89th in women's 10 km race, 82nd in women's sprint and 23rd in women's team sprint.
