= Tautvydas Strolia =

Lithuanian cross-country skier (born 1995)

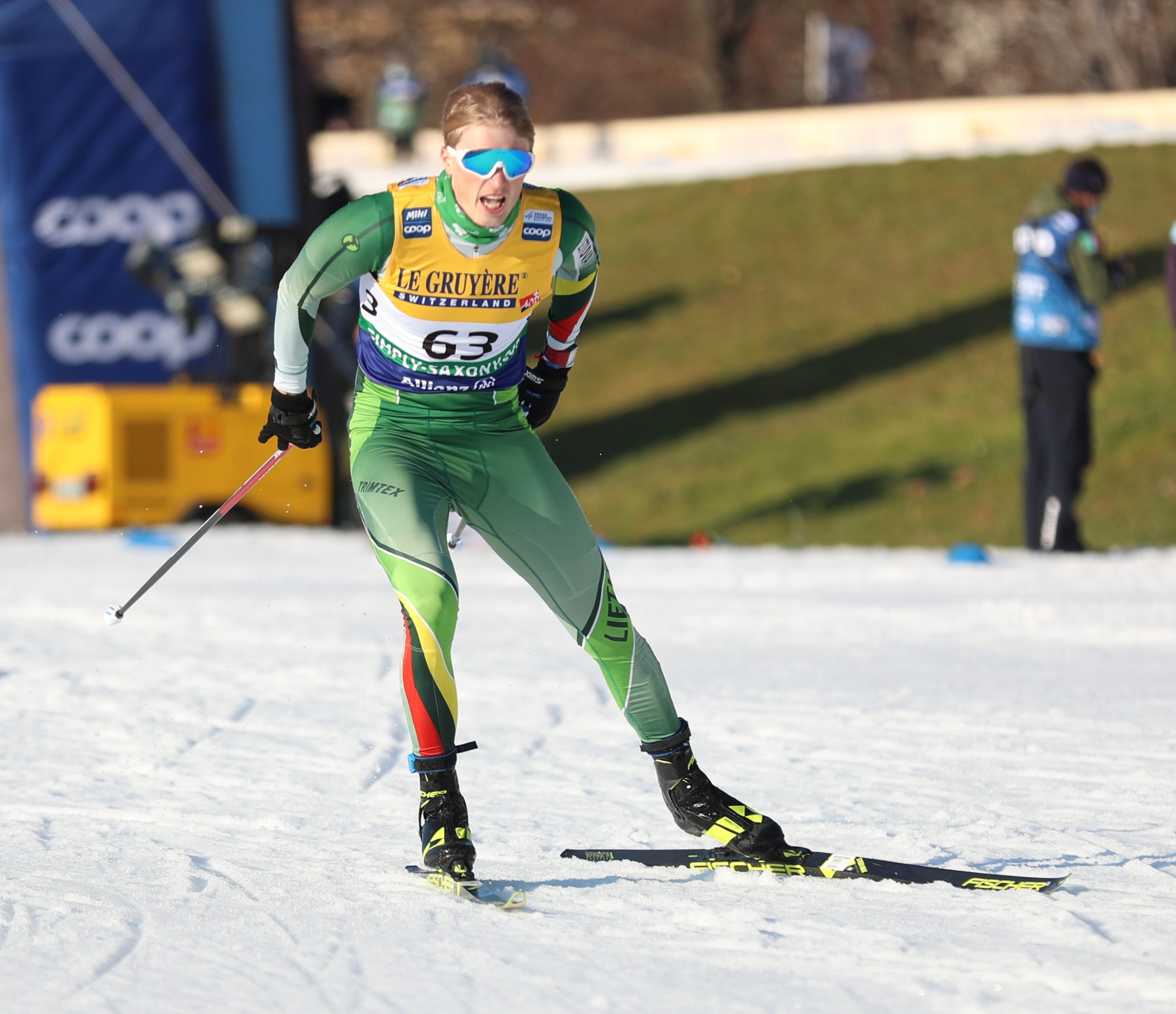
- Strolia in 2020

Personal information
- Born: 31 March 1995 (age 31) Ignalina, Lithuania
- Height: 1.85 m (6 ft 1 in)
- Weight: 72 kg (159 lb)

Sport
- Country: Lithuania
- Sport: Cross-country skiing

Tautvydas Strolia (born 31 March 1995) is a Lithuanian cross-country skier.

Strolia represented Lithuania at the FIS Nordic World Ski Championships 2021. He finished 84th in men's sprint, failed to qualify for individual 15 km race and was part of Lithuania's relay and sprint teams.

Strolia was selected to represent Lithuania at the 2022 Winter Olympics.

== Family ==
His father Vytautas Strolia is a former Lithuanian national champion in biathlon. His older brother Mantas Strolia represented Lithuania at the 2010 and 2018 Olympics.
