= Ieva Dainytė =

Lithuanian cross-country skier (born 2005)

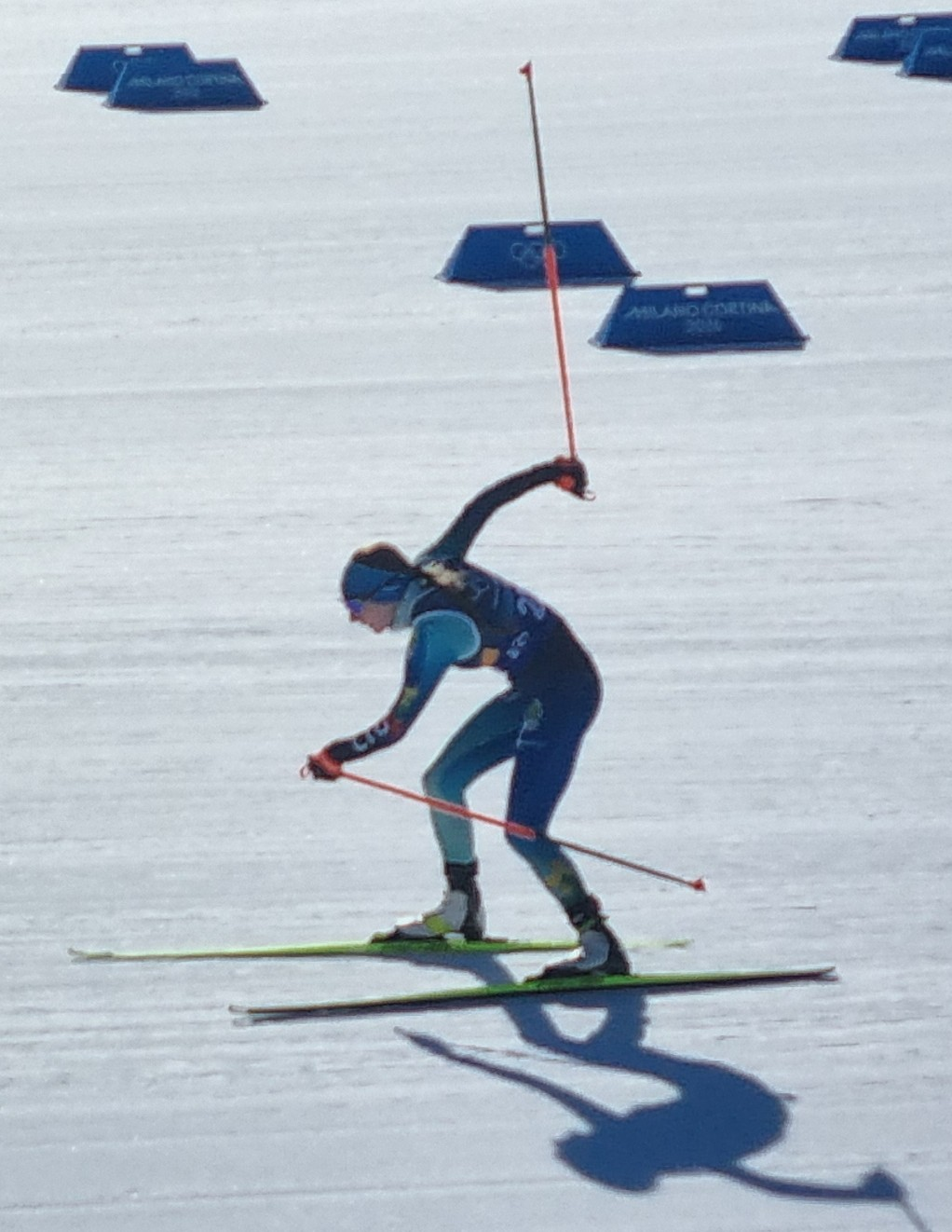
- 2026 Winter Olympics

Personal information
- Born: 24 February 2005 (age 21) Daugailiai, Lithuania

Sport
- Country: Lithuania
- Sport: Cross-country skiing
- Club: Utenos DSC
- Coached by: Svetlana Dervinienė; Stasys Dervinis

Ieva Dainytė (born 24 February 2005) is a Lithuanian cross-country skier.

== Biography ==
=== 2021 World Championships ===
Dainytė represented Lithuania at the FIS Nordic World Ski Championships 2021. She finished 97th in women's sprint, failed to qualify for individual 10 km race and was part of Lithuania's relay and sprint teams.

In pair with Eglė Savickaitė, Dainytė participated in women's team sprint competition. Lithuanian pair finished 26th overall and failed to qualify for the final. Dainytė was a part of Lithuanian national relay team that was ranked in 15th place.

=== 2022 Olympics ===
Dainytė was selected to represent Lithuania at the 2022 Winter Olympics. Dainytė finished 91st in women's 10 km race, 86th in women's sprint and 23rd in women's team sprint.
