= Lora Hristova =

Bulgarian biathlete (born 2003)

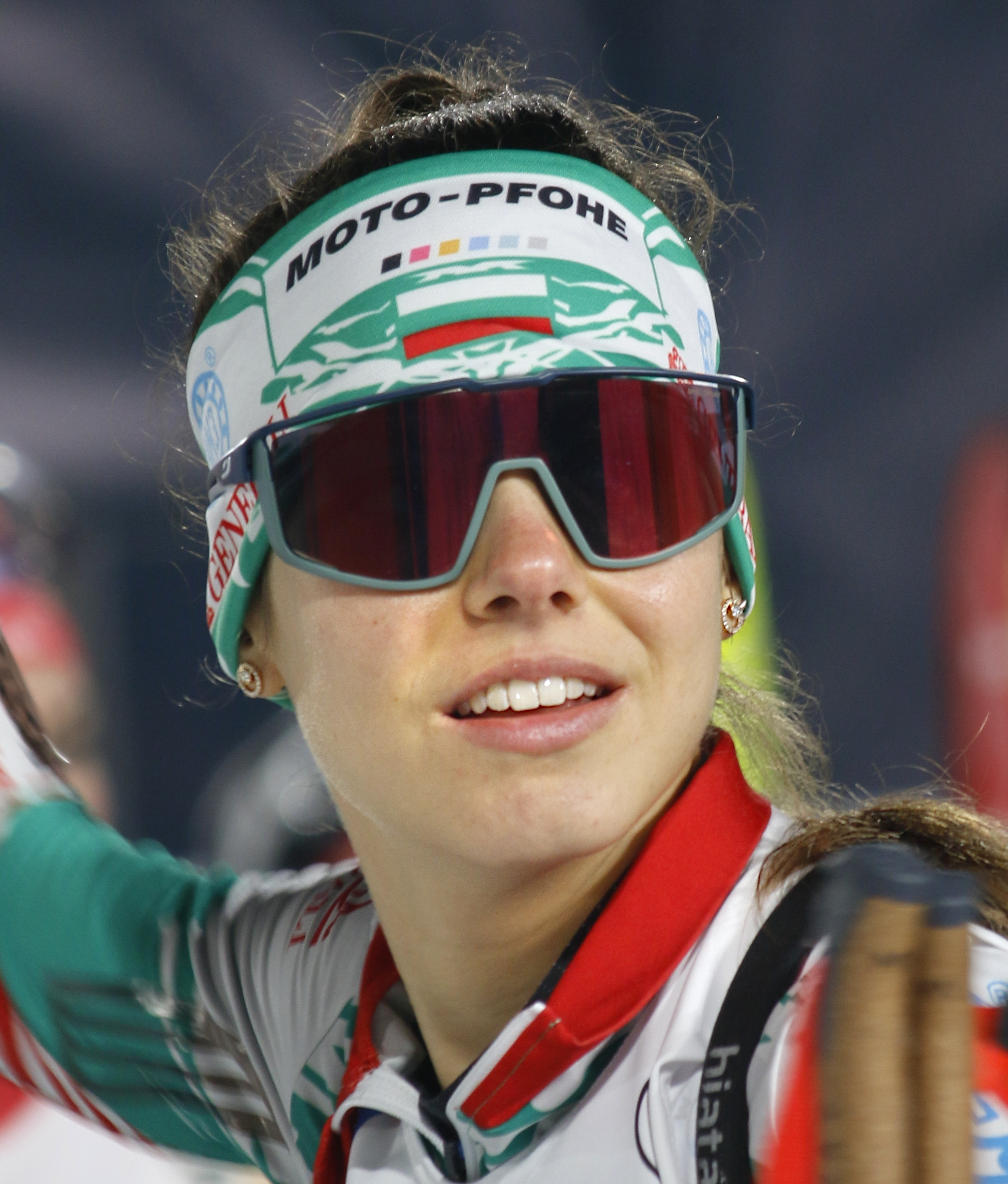
- Hristova in 2024

Personal information
- Nationality: Bulgarian
- Born: 23 April 2003 (age 23) Sofia, Bulgaria

Sport
- Sport: Biathlon
- Coached by: Wolfgang Pichler
Medal record
Women's biathlon
Representing Bulgaria
Event	1st	2nd	3rd
Olympic Games	0	0	1
Total	0	0	1
Olympic Games
Bronze medal – third place	2026 Milano Cortina	15 km individual

Lora Hristova (Bulgarian: Лора Христова) (born 23 April 2003) is a Bulgarian biathlete. She won a bronze medal in the women's individual race at the 2026 Winter Olympics. This was Bulgaria's third Olympic Biathlon medal after Ekaterina Dafovska's gold in 1998 and Irina Nikulchina's bronze in 2002. Hristova received support from the Olympic Solidarity programme.

Prior to the 2026 Olympics, she was coached by Wolfgang Pichler.

== Biathlon results ==
All results are sourced from the International Biathlon Union.

=== Olympic Games ===
1 medal (1 bronze)

Event	Individual	Sprint	Pursuit	Mass start	Relay	Mixed relay
(China) 2022 Beijing	—	89th	—	—	18th	—
(Italy) 2026 Milano Cortina	Bronze	11th	7th	14th	12th	16th
