= Modestas Vaičiulis =

Lithuanian cross-country skier (born 1989)

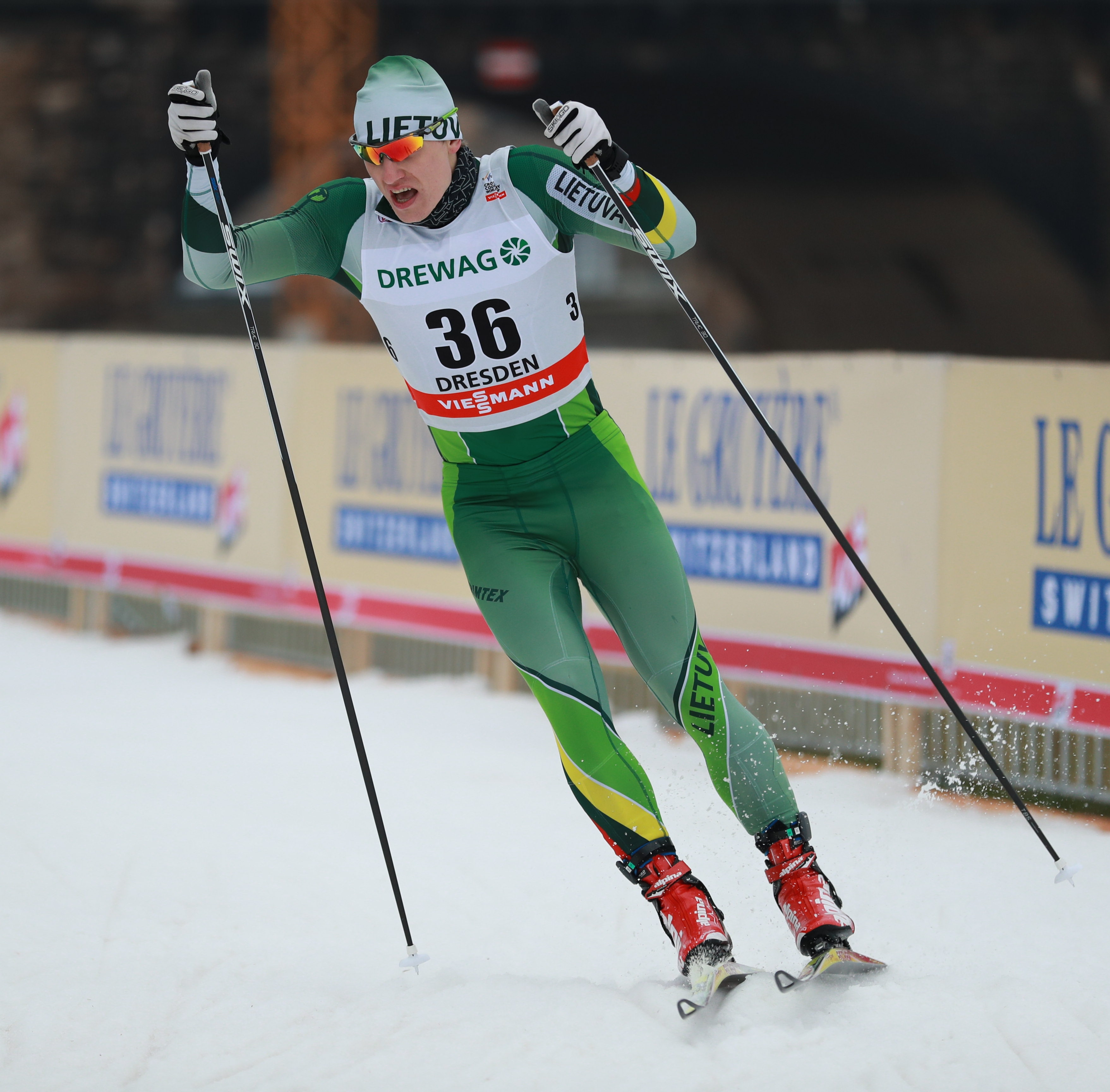
- Vaičiulis in 2018

Personal information
- Born: 11 April 1989 (age 37) Ignalina, Lithuanian SSR, Soviet Union
- Height: 183 cm (6 ft 0 in)
- Weight: 79 kg (174 lb)

Sport
- Country: Lithuania
- Sport: Cross-country skiing

Modestas Vaičiulis (born 11 April 1989) is a Lithuanian cross-country skier since 2007. At the 2010 Winter Olympics in Vancouver, he finished 18th in the team sprint and 54th in the individual sprint events. Vaičiulius returned to represent Lithuania at the 2018, 2022, and 2026 Winter Olympics.

Vaičiulis finished 49th in the sprint event at the FIS Nordic World Ski Championships 2009 in Liberec.

His best World Cup finish was 28th in a sprint event in Dresden in 2020.
