= Khrystyna Dmytrenko =

Ukrainian biathlete (born 1999)

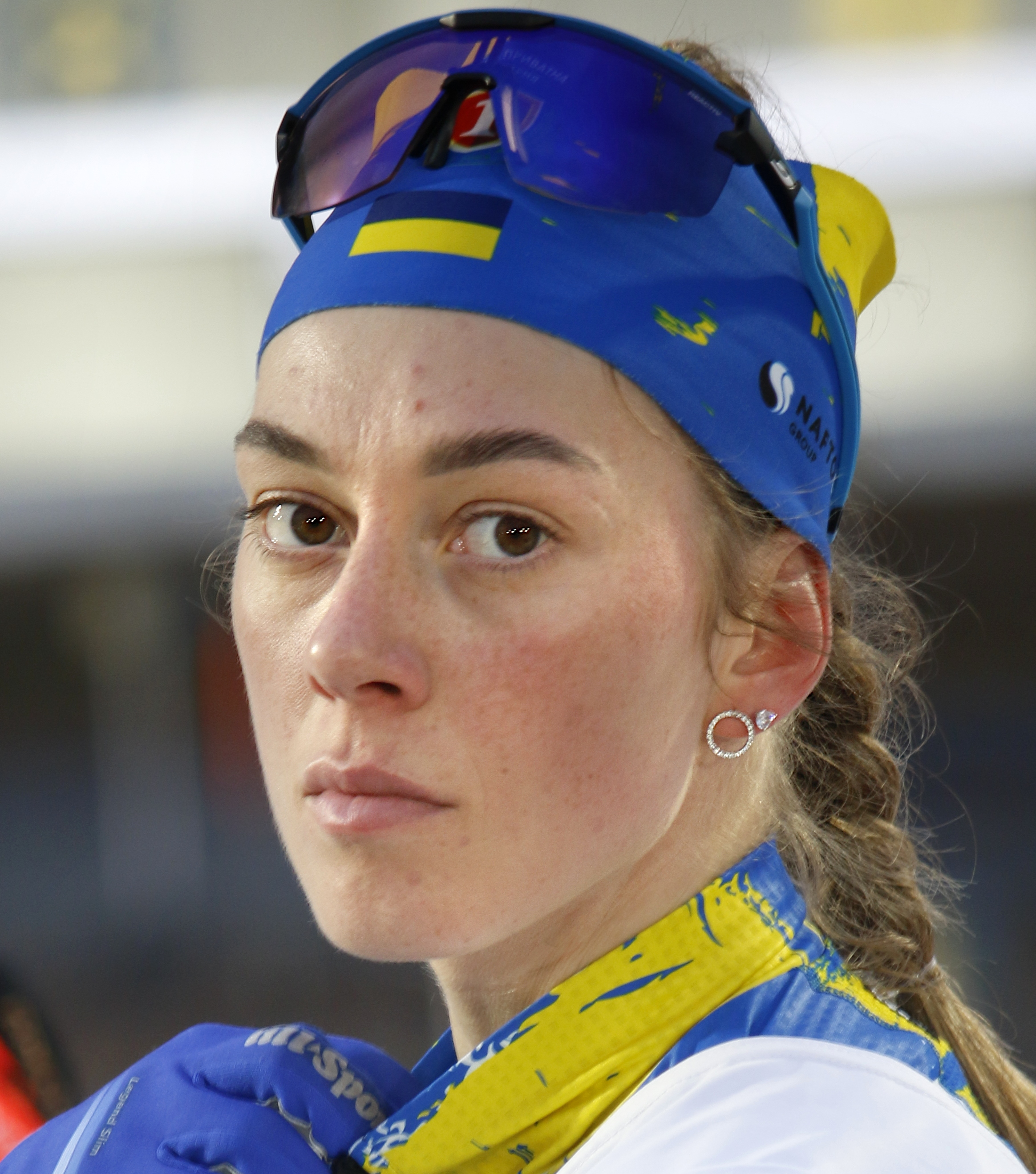
- Khrystyna Dmytrenko in 2024

Personal information
- Full name: Khrystyna Dmytrenko
- Born: 31 May 1999 (age 27) Chernihiv, Ukraine
- Height: 1.70 m (5 ft 7 in)
- Weight: 55 kg (121 lb)

Sport

Professional information
- Sport: Biathlon
Medal record
Women's biathlon
Representing Ukraine
Winter Youth Olympics
Gold medal – first place	2016 Lillehammer	Pursuit
European Championships
Bronze medal – third place	2024 Osrblie	7.5 km sprint
European Youth Olympic Winter Festival
Silver medal – second place	2017 Erzurum	Sprint

Khrystyna Dmytrenko (Ukrainian: Христина Романівна Дмитренко; born 31 May 1999) is a Ukrainian biathlete. She's a 2016 Youth Olympic champion. She represted Ukraine at the 2026 Winter Olympics.

== Career ==
She represented Ukraine at the 2016 Winter Youth Olympics in Lillehammer and became the first ever Ukrainian youth Olympic champion both in biathlon and winter sports.

== Biathlon results ==
All results are sourced from the International Biathlon Union.

=== Olympic Games ===
0 medals

Event	Individual	Sprint	Pursuit	Mass start	Relay	Mixed relay
(Italy) 2026 Milano Cortina	18th	54th	45th	—	9th	—

=== World Championships ===
Event	Individual	Sprint	Pursuit	Mass start	Relay	Mixed relay	Single mixed relay
(Czech Republic) 2024 Nové Mesto	8th	12th	26th	27th	5th	—	—
(Switzerland) 2025 Lenzerheide	11th	48th	30th	29th	11th	8th	—

=== World Cup ===
Season	Overall			Individual		Sprint		Pursuit		Mass start	
Season	Races	Points	Position	Points	Position	Points	Position	Points	Position	Points	Position
2023–24	12/21	63	57th	9	60th	17	61st	25	52nd	12	42nd
2024–25	16/21	224	32nd	43	27th	84	31st	76	30th	21	47th

=== IBU Cup ===
==== Podiums ====
Season	Place	Competition	Placement
2022–23	Canmore, Canada	Sprint	3

=== Junior World Cup ===
==== Podiums ====
Season	Place	Competition	Placement
2016–17	Lenzerheide, Switzerland	Sprint	2
2016–17	Pokljuka, Slovenia	Mixed relay	3
