= Natalja Kočergina =

Lithuanian biathlete and cross-country skier (born 1985)

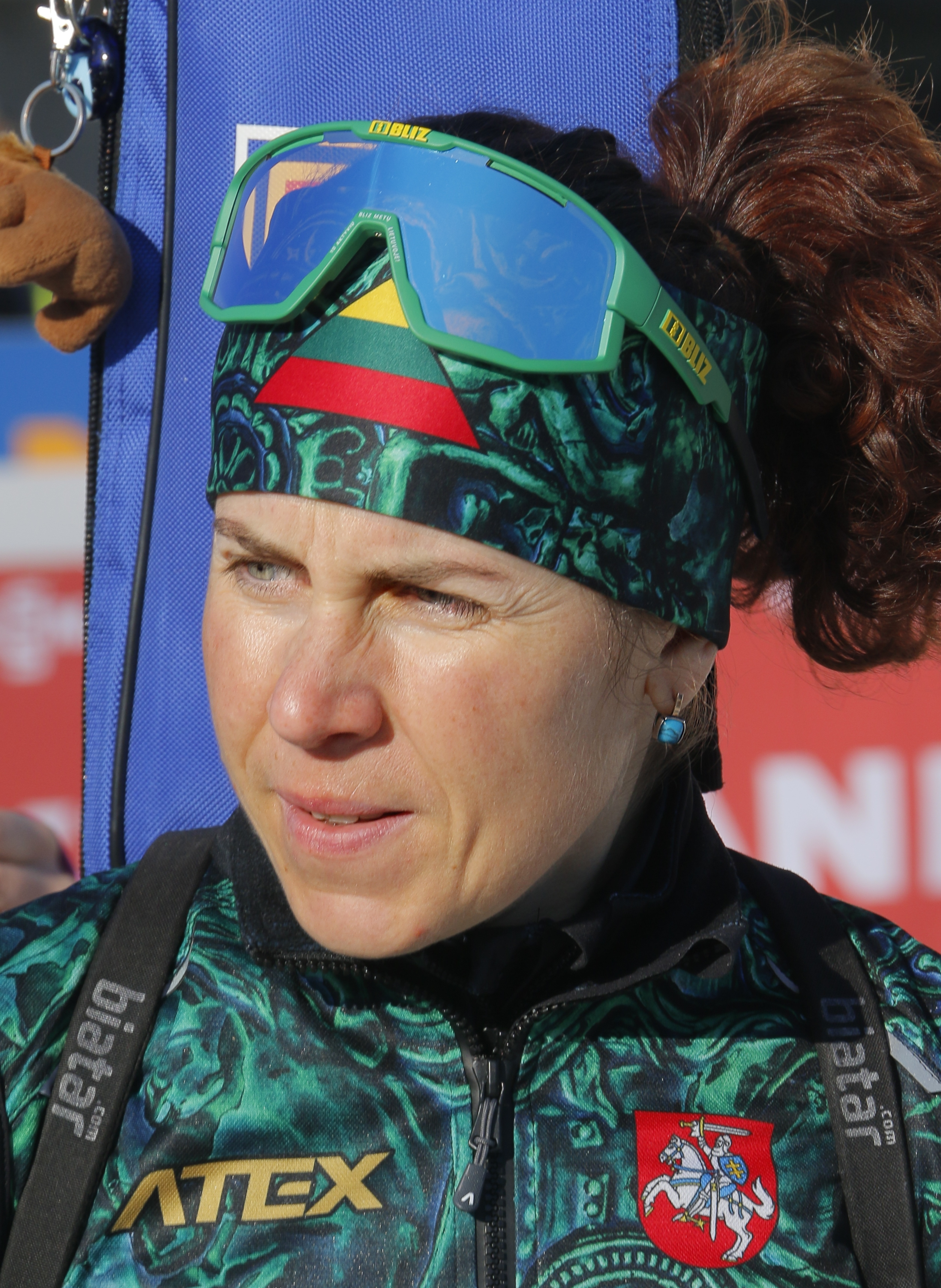
- Kocergina in 2023

Personal information
- Born: 17 April 1985 (age 41) Oleksiyevo-Druzhkivka, Dontesk, Ukraine

Natalja Kočergina (born 17 April 1985) is a Lithuanian athlete. She competes in cross-country skiing and biathlon events. She has competed at multiple FIS Nordic World Ski Championships and Biathlon World Cups. She represented Lithuania at the 2018 and 2026 Winter Olympics.

== Early career ==
Natalja Kočergina was born 17 April 1985 in Oleksiievo-Druzhkivka, Donetsk Oblast, Ukraine.

== Career ==
Kočergina started competing in cross-country events in 2003. She started competing in the Biathlon World Cup events in 2011. In the 2011 World Biathlon Championships, she finished 91st (individual) and 98th (sprint). In 2012, she was 72nd in individual and 89th in sprint. During the 2013 World Championships, she did not finish in the individual event but placed 99th in the sprint.

In 2013, Kočergina participated in the FIS Nordic World Ski Championships, finishing 54th in the Women's 10 km freestyle and 20th in the team sprint. In 2014, she became the Lithuanian champion in biathlon for the first time. In 2018, she was named to the Lithuanian team for the 2018 Winter Olympics. This was her first appearance at the Winter Olympics. In the women's events, Kočergina was the best placed woman skier for Lithuania after she was classified 30th amongst the 87 contestants in the women's individual event. She finished the course in a time of 45 minutes and 9.1 seconds. In the sprint event, she was ranked 80th amongst the 87 competitors. She finished the race in 25 minutes and 16 seconds, more than four minutes behind the winner Laura Dahlmeier.

In January 2026, the Lithuanian Biathlon Federation announced that Kočergina was selected to represent the country at the 2026 Winter Olympics.

== Biathlon results ==
All results are sourced from the International Biathlon Union.

=== Olympic Games ===
0 medals

Event	Individual	Sprint	Pursuit	Mass Start	Relay	Mixed Relay
(South Korea) 2018 Pyeongchang	30th	80th	—	—	—	DNF
(Italy) 2026 Milano Cortina	87th	90th	—	—	20th	—

=== World Championships ===
0 medals

Event	Individual	Sprint	Pursuit	Mass start	Relay	Mixed relay	Single Mixed relay
(Russia) 2011 Khanty-Mansiysk	91st	98th	—N/a	—N/a	—N/a	—N/a	—N/a
(Germany) 2012 Ruhpolding	72nd	89th	—N/a	—N/a	23rd	25th	—N/a
(Czech Republic) 2013 Nové Město na Moravě	DNF	99th	—N/a	—N/a	23rd	25th	—N/a
(Finland) 2015 Kontiolahti	90th	—N/a	—N/a	—N/a	20th	—N/a	—N/a
(Norway) 2016 Oslo	87th	87th	—N/a	—N/a	—N/a	23rd	—N/a
(Austria) 2017 Hochfilzen	89th	75th	—N/a	—N/a	21st	24th	—N/a
(Sweden) 2019 Östersund	80th	27th	51st	—N/a	—N/a	24th	25th
(Italy) 2020 Antholz-Anterselva	61st	34th	56th	—N/a	—N/a	16th	24th
(Slovenia) 2021 Pokljuka	69th	83rd	—N/a	—N/a	—N/a	17th	24th
(Germany) 2023 Oberhof	80th	52nd	56th	—N/a	—N/a	18th	—N/a
(Czech Republic) 2024 Nové Město na Moravě	55th	55th	51st	—N/a	—N/a	17th	24th
(Switzerland) 2025 Lenzerheide	68th	84th	—N/a	—N/a	17th	—N/a	—N/a

*During Olympic seasons competitions are only held for those events not included in the Olympic program.
**The single mixed relay was added as an event in 2019.
