= Michela Carrara =

Italian biathlete (born 1997)

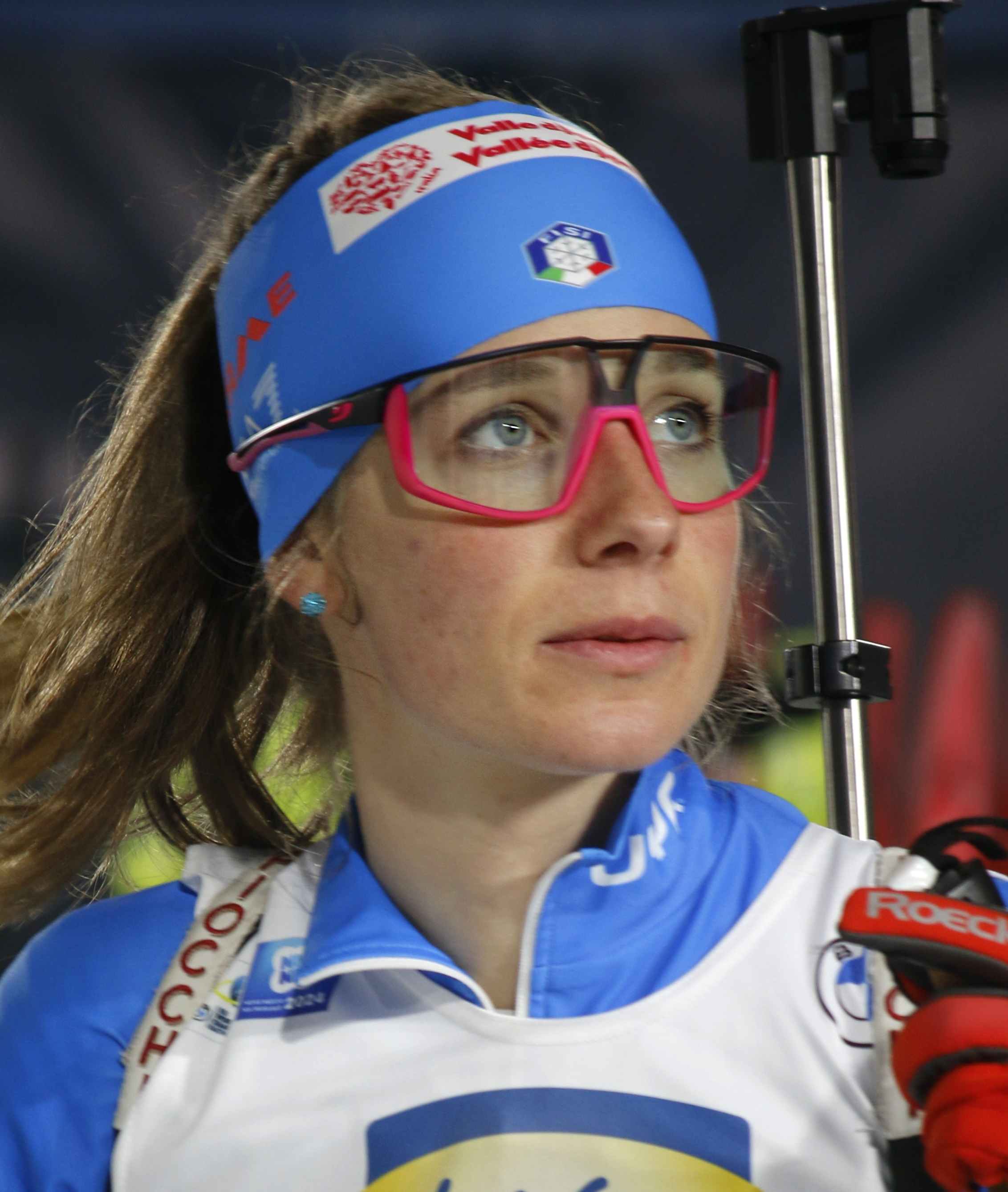
- Carrara in 2024

Personal information
- Nationality: Italian
- Born: 5 October 1997 (age 28) La Salle, Italy

Sport
- Sport: Biathlon
Medal record
Women's biathlon
Representing Italy
Junior World Championships
Gold medal – first place	2017 Osrblie	7.5 km sprint
Silver medal – second place	2017 Osrblie	10 km pursuit

Michela Carrara (born 5 October 1997) is an Italian biathlete.

== Career results ==
=== Olympic Games ===
0 medals

Event	Individual	Sprint	Pursuit	Mass start	Relay	Mixed relay
(China) 2022 Beijing	60th	—	—	—	—	—
(Italy) 2026 Milano Cortina	65th	23rd	36th	—	11th	—

=== World Championships ===
0 medals

Event	Individual	Sprint	Pursuit	Mass start	Relay	Mixed relay	Single mixed relay
(Italy) 2020 Antholz	49th	67th	—	—	10th	—	—
(Slovenia) 2021 Pokljuka	31st	23rd	38th	—	9th	—	—
(Czech Republic) 2024 Nové Město na Moravě	—	45th	33rd	—	—	—	—
(Switzerland) 2025 Lenzerheide	27th	5th	8th	13th	7th	—	—
