= Judita Traubaitė =

Lithuanian biathlete (born 2000)

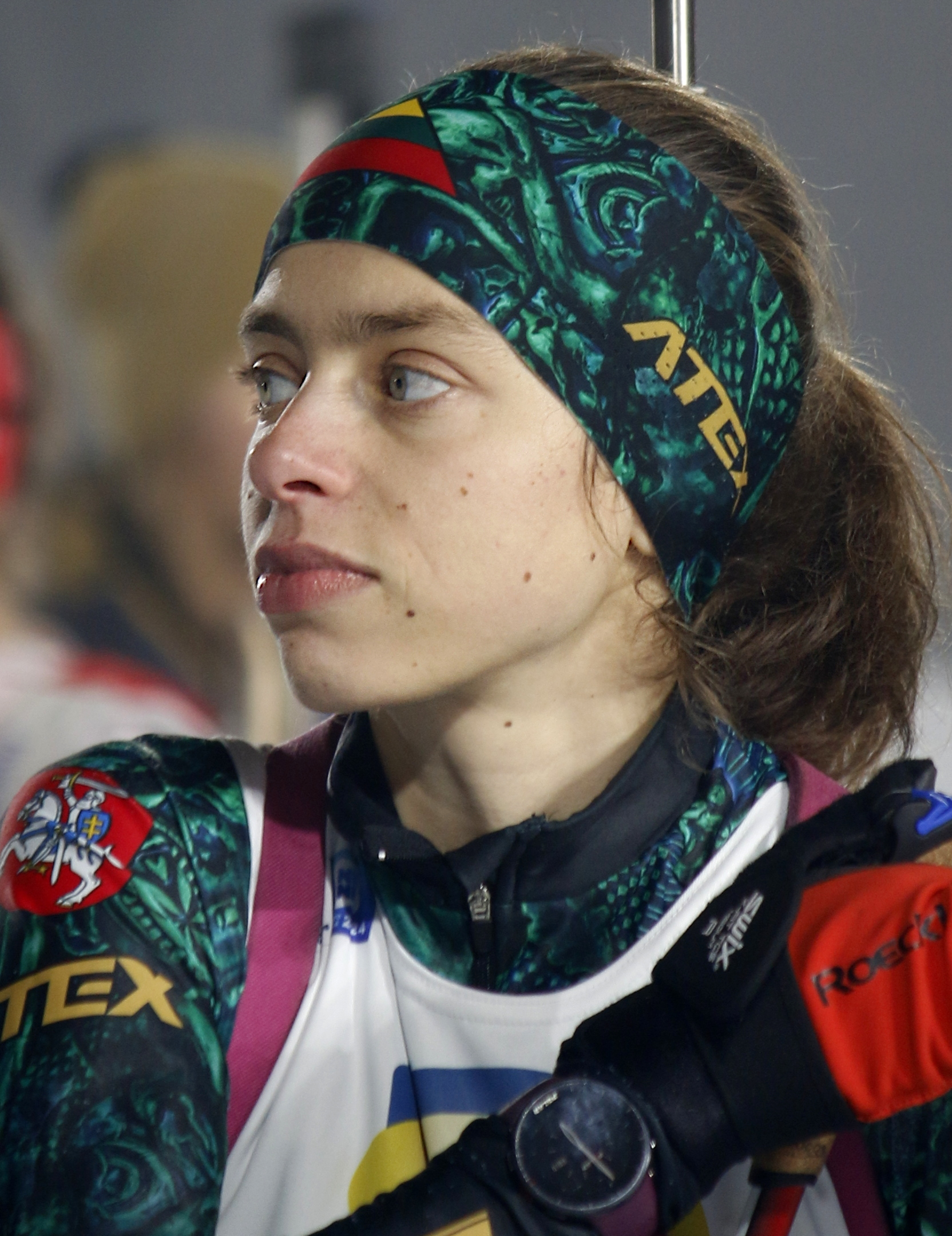
- Traubaitė in 2024

Personal information
- Nationality: Lithuanian
- Born: 11 July 2000 (age 26) Vilnius, Lithuania

Sport

Professional information
- Sport: Biathlon, ski orienteering
- IBU Cup debut: 2023
- World Cup debut: 2023

Olympic Games
- Teams: 1 (2026)
- Medals: 0

World Championships
- Teams: 2 (2024, 2025)

World Cup
- Seasons: 2 (2023/24-)

European/IBU Cup
- Seasons: 2 (2023/24-)

Judita Traubaitė (born July 11, 2000) is a Lithuanian biathlete, ski orienteer and footballer. She has competed in the Biathlon World Cup since 2024.

== Career ==
=== Football ===
Played football for the Vilnius MFA "Žalgiris" women's team, competing in Lithuania’s Women's A League.

=== Ski Orienteering ===
Represented Lithuania at the 2021 and 2022 World Championships.

In the 2020 World Junior (U20) Ski Orienteering Championships, she won a bronze medal. In the 2022 she won U23 Ski Orienteering World Cup. In 2023, at the World U23 Ski Orienteering Championship held in Norway, she claimed the gold medal in the middle-distance event, completing the course in 41 minutes and 57 seconds, finishing 43 seconds ahead of her closest competitor from Switzerland, as well as in the sprint event.

In 2024 she won Sprint event at the Ski Orienteering World Cup stage in Otepaa (Estonia).

=== Biathlon ===
Judita Traubaitė started her biathlon career in IBU Cup in season 2022/23. Since season 2023/24 she compets in the BWM World Cup.

In December 2023, at a Biathlon World Cup stage in Lenzerheide, Switzerland, she finished 49th in the 7.5 km sprint event, placing among the top 50 athletes. That same year, at the European Biathlon Championships in Slovakia, she finished in 31st place, significantly improving her previous best result.

== Biathlon results ==
All results are sourced from the International Biathlon Union.

=== Olympic Games ===
0 medals

Event	Individual	Sprint	Pursuit	Mass Start	Relay	Mixed Relay
(Italy) 2026 Milano Cortina	47th	49th	57th	—	20th	20th

=== World Championships ===
Event	Individual	Sprint	Pursuit	Mass start	Relay	Mixed relay	Single mixed relay
(Czech Republic) 2024 Nové Mesto	64th	74th	—	—	—	—	—
(Switzerland) 2025 Lenzerheide	49th	47th	54th	—	17th	16th	—
