= Lidiia Zhurauskaite =

Lithuanian biathlete (born 1999)

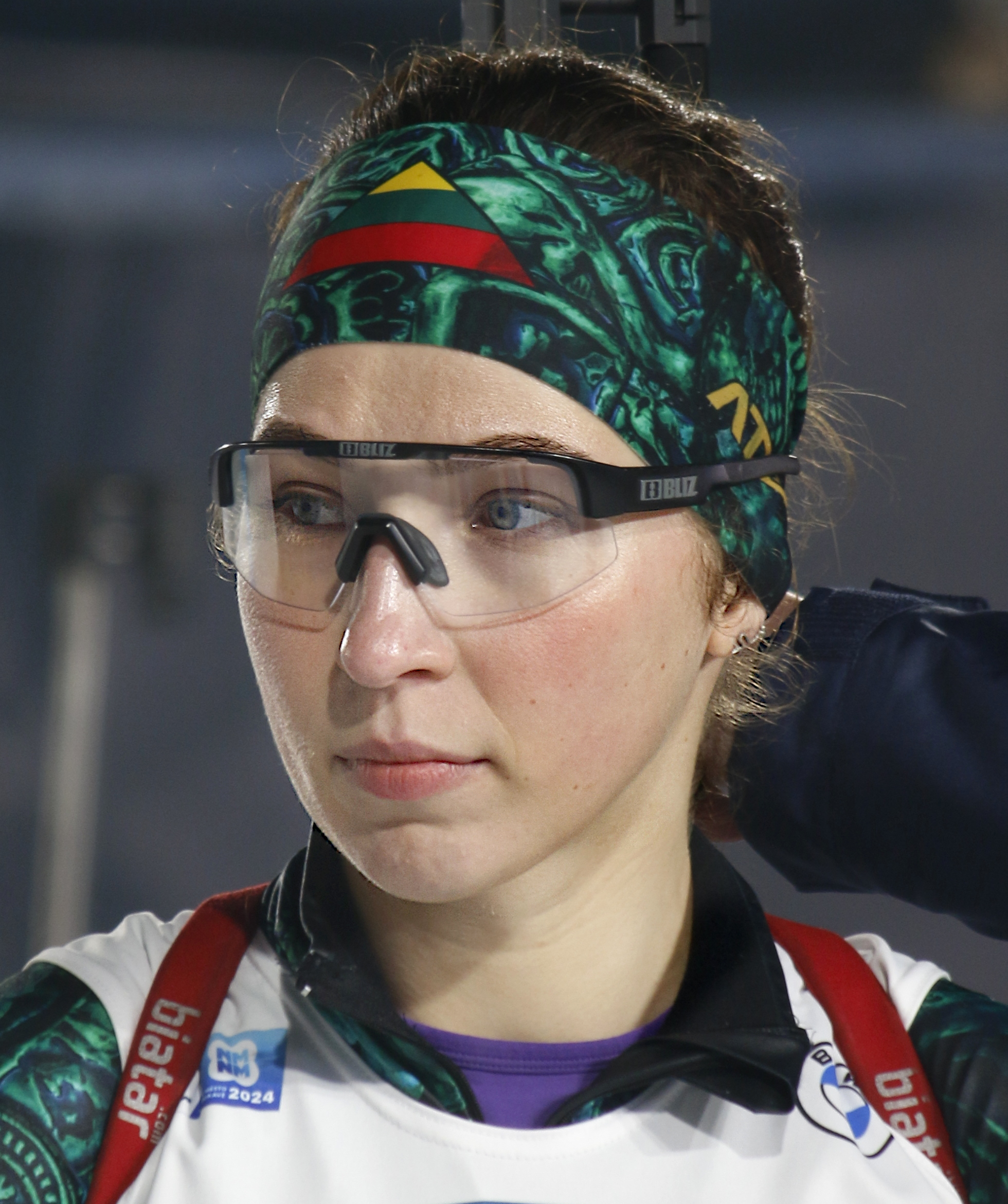
- Zhurauskaite in 2024

Personal information
- Nationality: Lithuanian
- Born: 9 April 1999 (age 27) Murmansk, Russia

Sport

Professional information
- Sport: Biathlon
- IBU Cup debut: 2023
- World Cup debut: 2023

World Championships
- Teams: 1 (2024)

World Cup
- Seasons: 1 (2023/24-)

European/IBU Cup
- Seasons: 1 (2023/24-)

Lidiia Zhurauskaite (born 9 April 1999) is a Russian-origin Lithuanian biathlete. She has competed in the Biathlon World Cup since 2023.

== Career ==
Lidiia Zhurauskaite has had a relatively short international career. After participating in several races at the national level, she first drew attention in the summer of 2022 when she renounced her Russian citizenship by her own request and, due to family background, adopted Lithuanian citizenship. The background for this decision was the exclusion of Russian athletes from all biathlon events and the goal of competing in the 2026 Olympics. The exit was personally approved by Vladimir Putin.

Her first races for the Lithuanian Biathlon Federation were at the 2022 Summer Biathlon World Championships, after which she did not compete internationally for some time, returning only at the 2023 Summer Biathlon World Championships, where she placed 30th in the Super Sprint. At the beginning of the 2023/24 winter season, the Lithuanian made her debut in the IBU Cup, finishing 27th in the Kontiolahti individual race, which led to her immediate inclusion in the rather thinly populated World Cup squad. Her first pursuit race at the highest level was in December at Lenzerheide, and she performed even better during the weekend in Oberhof in early January 2024, where Zhurauskaite, despite a shooting miss, won her first World Cup points by finishing 31st in the sprint. In the subsequent pursuit, she dropped back to 54th place.

Zhurauskaite made her debut at the World Championship in 2024 in Nové Mesto with participation in the mixed relay.

== Biathlon results ==
All results are sourced from the International Biathlon Union.

=== Olympic Games ===
0 medals

Event	Individual	Sprint	Pursuit	Mass Start	Relay	Mixed Relay
(Italy) 2026 Milano Cortina	81st	64th	—	—	20th	20th

=== World Championships ===
Event	Individual	Sprint	Pursuit	Mass start	Relay	Mixed relay	Single mixed relay
(Czech Republic) 2024 Nové Mesto	43rd	60th	57th	—	—	17th	—
(Switzerland) 2025 Lenzerheide	45th	69th	—	—	17th	16th	22nd

=== World Cup ===
==== Overall standings ====
Season	Age	Overall			Individual		Sprint		Pursuit		Mass start	
Season	Age	Races	Points	Position	Points	Position	Points	Position	Points	Position	Points	Position
2023–24	24	11/21	10	82nd	—	—	10	72nd	—	—	—	—
2024–25	25	12/21	12	81st	—	—	12	69th	—	—	—	—
