= Cross-country skiing at the 2010 Winter Olympics – Men's sprint =

Men's sprint at the XXI Olympic Winter Games
- Venue: Whistler Olympic Park
- Dates: 17 February 2010
- Competitors: 62 from 25 nations
- Winning time: 3:36.3

Medalists
| 1st place, gold medalist(s) | | Nikita Kryukov | Russia |
| 2nd place, silver medalist(s) | | Alexander Panzhinskiy | Russia |
| 3rd place, bronze medalist(s) | | Petter Northug | Norway |

The Men's sprint cross-country skiing competition in the classical technique at the 2010 Winter Olympics in Vancouver, Canada was held on 17 February at Whistler Olympic Park in Whistler, British Columbia.

Sweden's Björn Lind was the defending Olympic champion in this event, though the event was in the freestyle technique. Norway's Ola Vigen Hattestad was the defending world champion in this event which was also held in freestyle technique. Emil Jönsson of Sweden won the test event that took place at Olympic venue on 16 January 2009. The last World Cup event prior to the 2010 Games in this format took place on 6 February 2010 in Canmore, Alberta and was won by Jönsson.

Lind was eliminated in the quarterfinals, Jönsson was eliminated in the semifinals, and Hattestad finished fourth. It is the first Olympic medals for all three finishers. The event ended in a photofinish between Russians Nikita Kryukov and Alexander Panzhinskiy with Kriukov edging out Panzhinsky who had led most of the race.

== Results ==
=== Qualifying ===
Qualifying took place at 10:45 PST.

| Rank | Bib | Athlete | Country | Time | Deficit | Note |
|---|---|---|---|---|---|---|
| 1 | 3 | Alexander Panzhinskiy | Russia | 3:34.57 | +0.00 | Q |
| 2 | 4 | Emil Jönsson | Sweden | 3:36.01 | +1.44 | Q |
| 3 | 14 | Ola Vigen Hattestad | Norway | 3:36.43 | +1.86 | Q |
| 4 | 5 | Nikita Kryukov | Russia | 3:36.46 | +1.89 | Q |
| 5 | 20 | Johan Kjølstad | Norway | 3:36.65 | +2.08 | Q |
| 6 | 13 | Petter Northug | Norway | 3:37.09 | +2.52 | Q |
| 7 | 1 | Øystein Pettersen | Norway | 3:37.34 | +2.77 | Q |
| 8 | 9 | Nikolay Chebotko | Kazakhstan | 3:37.84 | +3.27 | Q |
| 9 | 21 | Peeter Kümmel | Estonia | 3:37.99 | +3.42 | Q |
| 10 | 37 | Stefan Kuhn | Canada | 3:38.35 | +3.78 | Q |
| 11 | 23 | Yuichi Onda | Japan | 3:38.49 | +3.92 | Q |
| 12 | 45 | Sun Qinghai | China | 3:38.52 | +3.95 | Q |
| 13 | 15 | Jesper Modin | Sweden | 3:38.53 | +3.96 | Q |
| 14 | 16 | Björn Lind | Sweden | 3:38.62 | +4.05 | Q |
| 15 | 40 | Alexey Poltaranin | Kazakhstan | 3:38.68 | +4.11 | Q |
| 16 | 12 | Mikhail Devyatyarov, Jr. | Russia | 3:38.82 | +4.25 | Q |
| 17 | 11 | Cyril Miranda | France | 3:38.83 | +4.26 | Q |
| 18 | 19 | Teodor Peterson | Sweden | 3:39.08 | +4.51 | Q |
| 19 | 7 | Kalle Lassila | Finland | 3:39.12 | +4.55 | Q |
| 20 | 46 | Jesse Väänänen | Finland | 3:39.21 | +4.64 | Q |
| 21 | 26 | Sami Jauhojärvi | Finland | 3:39.57 | +5.00 | Q |
| 22 | 10 | Renato Pasini | Italy | 3:39.63 | +5.06 | Q |
| 23 | 18 | Nikolay Morilov | Russia | 3:40.22 | +5.65 | Q |
| 24 | 29 | Devon Kershaw | Canada | 3:40.50 | +5.93 | Q |
| 25 | 43 | Timo Simonlatser | Estonia | 3:40.65 | +6.08 | Q |
| 26 | 24 | Fabio Pasini | Italy | 3:40.86 | +6.29 | Q |
| 27 | 41 | Janusz Krężelok | Poland | 3:41.34 | +6.77 | Q |
| 28 | 34 | Maciej Kreczmer | Poland | 3:41.35 | +6.78 | Q |
| 29 | 42 | Simi Hamilton | United States | 3:41.53 | +6.96 | Q |
| 30 | 8 | Loris Frasnelli | Italy | 3:41.78 | +7.21 | Q |
| 31 | 33 | Josef Wenzl | Germany | 3:41.88 | +7.31 | |
| 31 | 39 | Roddy Darragon | France | 3:41.88 | +7.31 | |
| 33 | 17 | Tim Tscharnke | Germany | 3:42.03 | +7.46 | |
| 34 | 35 | Christoph Eigenmann | Switzerland | 3:42.18 | +7.61 | |
| 35 | 36 | Dušan Kožíšek | Czech Republic | 3:42.45 | +7.88 | |
| 36 | 28 | Torin Koos | United States | 3:42.72 | +8.15 | |
| 37 | 6 | Matias Strandvall | Finland | 3:42.74 | +8.17 | |
| 38 | 30 | Valerio Leccardi | Switzerland | 3:42.84 | +8.27 | |
| 39 | 27 | David Hofer | Italy | 3:42.89 | +8.32 | |
| 40 | 51 | Drew Goldsack | Canada | 3:44.28 | +9.71 | |
| 41 | 49 | Brent McMurtry | Canada | 3:45.02 | +10.45 | |
| 42 | 32 | Anti Saarepuu | Estonia | 3:45.44 | +10.87 | |
| 43 | 38 | Peter von Allmen | Switzerland | 3:46.16 | +11.59 | |
| 44 | 25 | Aleš Razym | Czech Republic | 3:46.42 | +11.85 | |
| 45 | 2 | Andrew Newell | United States | 3:46.77 | +12.20 | |
| 46 | 53 | Mantas Strolia | Lithuania | 3:47.17 | +12.60 | |
| 47 | 48 | Garrott Kuzzy | United States | 3:47.46 | +12.89 | |
| 48 | 47 | Sergey Cherepanov | Kazakhstan | 3:48.29 | +13.72 | |
| 49 | 22 | Eligius Tambornino | Switzerland | 3:48.33 | +13.76 | |
| 50 | 52 | Lefteris Fafalis | Greece | 3:49.09 | +14.52 | |
| 51 | 50 | Leanid Karneyenka | Belarus | 3:49.12 | +14.55 | |
| 52 | 44 | Yevgeniy Koshevoy | Kazakhstan | 3:49.51 | +14.94 | |
| 53 | 55 | Aleksei Novoselski | Lithuania | 3:51.70 | +17.13 | |
| 54 | 54 | Modestas Vaičiulis | Lithuania | 3:52.10 | +17.53 | |
| 55 | 57 | Paul Murray | Australia | 3:52.96 | +18.39 | |
| 56 | 62 | Francois Soulie | Andorra | 3:55.22 | +20.65 | |
| 57 | 56 | Peter Mlynár | Slovakia | 3:55.76 | +21.19 | |
| 58 | 58 | Andrew Musgrave | Great Britain | 3:58.43 | +23.86 | |
| 59 | 31 | Kein Einaste | Estonia | 3:59.19 | +24.62 | |
| 60 | 60 | Andrew Young | Great Britain | 4:02.19 | +27.62 | |
| 61 | 59 | Oliver Kraas | South Africa | 4:04.19 | +29.62 | |
| 62 | 61 | Janis Paipals | Latvia | 4:04.48 | +29.91 | |

=== Quarterfinals ===
Quarterfinals took place at 12:55 PST.

| Rank | Seed | Athlete | Country | Time | Deficit | Note |
|---|---|---|---|---|---|---|
| 1 | 1 | Alexander Panzhinskiy | Russia | 3:36.4 | +0.0 | Q |
| 2 | 21 | Sami Jauhojärvi | Finland | 3:36.9 | +0.5 | Q |
| 3 | 10 | Stefan Kuhn | Canada | 3:37.4 | +1.0 | |
| 4 | 11 | Yuichi Onda | Japan | 3:37.9 | +1.5 | |
| 5 | 20 | Jesse Väänänen | Finland | 3:38.9 | +2.3 | |
| 6 | 30 | Loris Frasnelli | Italy | 3:40.9 | +4.5 | |

Quarterfinal 2

| Rank | Seed | Athlete | Country | Time | Deficit | Note |
|---|---|---|---|---|---|---|
| 1 | 7 | Øystein Pettersen | Norway | 3:36.9 | +0.0 | Q |
| 2 | 4 | Nikita Kryukov | Russia | 3:37.2 | +0.3 | Q |
| 3 | 17 | Cyril Miranda | France | 3:37.3 | +0.4 | |
| 4 | 14 | Björn Lind | Sweden | 3:37.6 | +0.7 | |
| 5 | 24 | Devon Kershaw | Canada | 3:39.9 | +3.0 | |
| 6 | 27 | Janusz Krężelok | Poland | 3:41.1 | +4.2 | |

Quarterfinal 3

| Rank | Seed | Athlete | Country | Time | Deficit | Note |
|---|---|---|---|---|---|---|
| 1 | 6 | Petter Northug | Norway | 3:34.5 | +0.0 | Q |
| 2 | 15 | Alexey Poltaranin | Kazakhstan | 3:34.7 | +0.2 | Q |
| 3 | 5 | Johan Kjølstad | Norway | 3:35.3 | +0.8 | LL |
| 4 | 16 | Mikhail Devyatyarov, Jr. | Russia | 3:35.3 | +0.8 | LL |
| 5 | 26 | Fabio Pasini | Italy | 3:35.7 | +1.2 | |
| 6 | 25 | Timo Simonlatser | Estonia | 3:42.2 | +8.7 | |

Quarterfinal 4

| Rank | Seed | Athlete | Country | Time | Deficit | Note |
|---|---|---|---|---|---|---|
| 1 | 2 | Emil Jönsson | Sweden | 3:41.8 | +0.0 | Q |
| 2 | 19 | Kalle Lassila | Finland | 3:42.2 | +0.4 | Q |
| 3 | 9 | Peeter Kümmel | Estonia | 3:42.4 | +0.6 | |
| 4 | 22 | Renato Pasini | Italy | 3:42.8 | +1.0 | |
| 5 | 12 | Sun Qinghai | China | 3:43.1 | +1.3 | |
| 6 | 29 | Simi Hamilton | United States | 3:43.4 | +1.6 | |

Quarterfinal 5

| Rank | Seed | Athlete | Country | Time | Deficit | Note |
|---|---|---|---|---|---|---|
| 1 | 3 | Ola Vigen Hattestad | Norway | 3:37.8 | +0.0 | Q |
| 2 | 18 | Teodor Peterson | Sweden | 3:38.3 | +0.5 | Q |
| 3 | 8 | Nikolay Chebotko | Kazakhstan | 3:38.6 | +0.8 | |
| 4 | 13 | Jesper Modin | Sweden | 3:39.1 | +1.3 | |
| 5 | 28 | Maciej Kreczmer | Poland | 3:39.6 | +1.8 | |
| 6 | 23 | Nikolay Morilov | Russia | 3:40.2 | +2.4 | |

=== Semifinals ===
Semifinals took place at 13:30 PST.

Semifinals 1

| Rank | Seed | Athlete | Country | Time | Deficit | Note |
|---|---|---|---|---|---|---|
| 1 | 1 | Alexander Panzhinskiy | Russia | 3:34.3 | +0.0 | Q |
| 2 | 7 | Øystein Pettersen | Norway | 3:34.4 | +0.1 | Q |
| 3 | 4 | Nikita Kryukov | Russia | 3:34.6 | +0.3 | LL |
| 4 | 15 | Alexey Poltaranin | Kazakhstan | 3:35.6 | +1.1 | LL |
| 5 | 5 | Johan Kjølstad | Norway | 3:35.9 | +1.6 | |
| 6 | 21 | Sami Jauhojärvi | Finland | 3:39.6 | +5.3 | |

Semifinals 2

| Rank | Seed | Athlete | Country | Time | Deficit | Note |
|---|---|---|---|---|---|---|
| 1 | 3 | Ola Vigen Hattestad | Norway | 3:36.5 | +0.0 | Q |
| 2 | 6 | Petter Northug | Norway | 3:36.7 | +0.2 | Q |
| 3 | 2 | Emil Jönsson | Sweden | 3:37.4 | +0.9 | |
| 4 | 16 | Mikhail Devyatyarov, Jr. | Russia | 3:37.6 | +1.1 | |
| 5 | 19 | Kalle Lassila | Finland | 3:43.7 | +7.2 | |
| 6 | 18 | Teodor Peterson | Sweden | 3:43.8 | +7.3 | |

=== Finals ===
Finals took place at 13:55 PST.

| Rank | Seed | Athlete | Country | Time | Deficit | Note |
|---|---|---|---|---|---|---|
| 1st place, gold medalist(s) | 4 | Nikita Kryukov | Russia | 3:36.3 | +0.0 | |
| 2nd place, silver medalist(s) | 1 | Alexander Panzhinskiy | Russia | 3:36.3 | +0.0 | |
| 3rd place, bronze medalist(s) | 6 | Petter Northug | Norway | 3:45.5 | +9.2 | |
| 4 | 3 | Ola Vigen Hattestad | Norway | 3:50.0 | +13.7 | |
| 5 | 15 | Alexey Poltaranin | Kazakhstan | 3:54.4 | +18.1 | |
| 6 | 7 | Øystein Pettersen | Norway | 4:56.2 | +1:19.9 | |

== See also ==
- Cross-country skiing at the 2010 Winter Paralympics – Men's 1 km Sprint Classic
