= FIS Nordic World Ski Championships 2011 – Men's team sprint =

Men's team sprint at the FIS Nordic World Ski Championships 2011
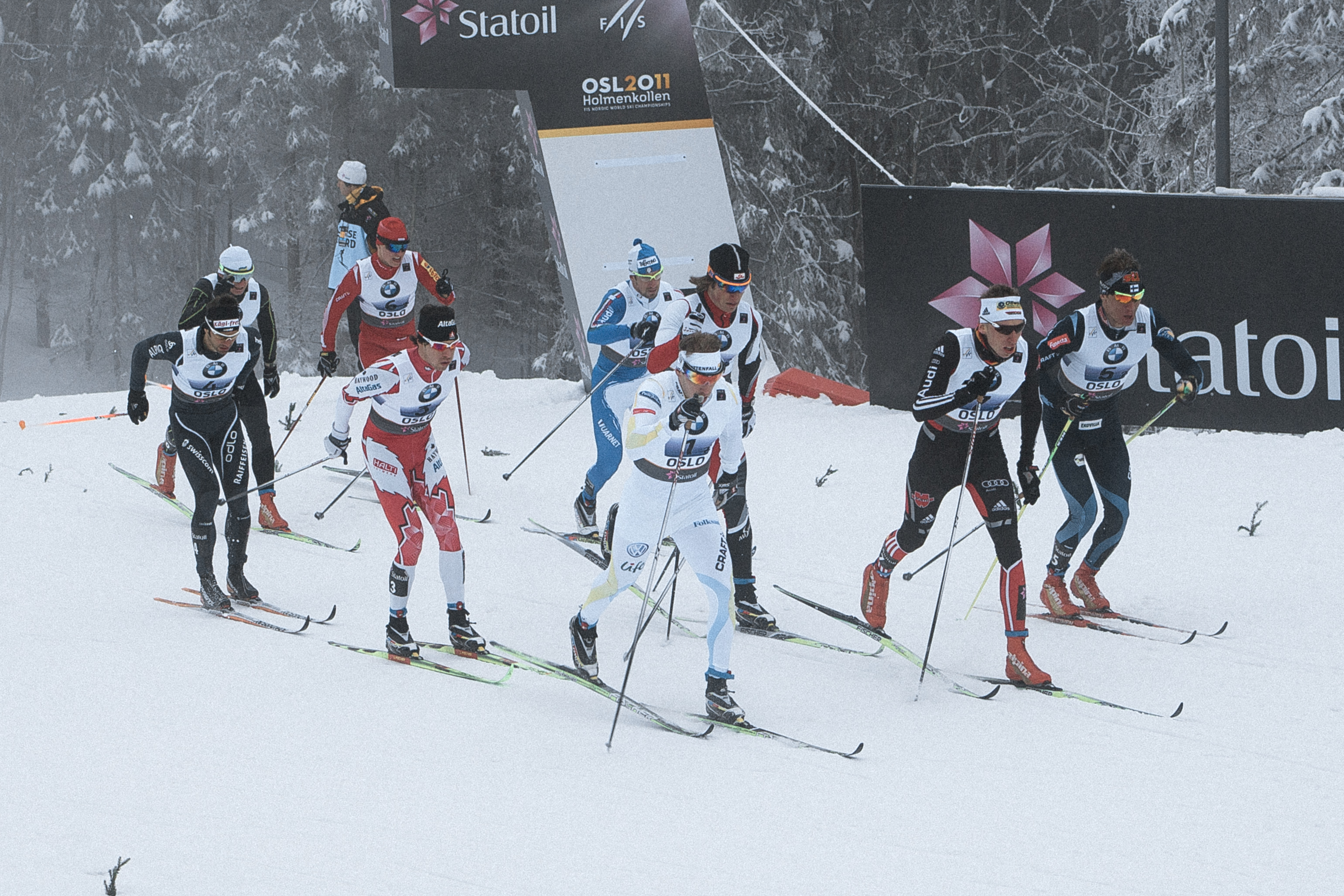
- Venue: Holmenkollen National Arena
- Date: 2 March 2011
- Competitors: 46 from 23 nations
- Teams: 23
- Winning time: 19:10.0

Medalists
gold medal	Devon Kershaw; Alex Harvey	Canada
silver medal	Petter Northug; Ola Vigen Hattestad	Norway
bronze medal	Alexander Panzhinskiy; Nikita Kryukov	Russia

The Men's team sprint took place on 2 March 2011. Sprint qualifying at 12:00 CET and finals at 14:15 CET. The defending world champions were Norway's Ola Vigen Hattestad and Johan Kjølstad while the defending Olympic champion were Norway's Øystein Pettersen and Petter Northug.

== Results ==
=== Semifinals ===
Semifinal 1

Rank	Heat	Bib	Country	Athletes	Time	Note
1	1	1	Sweden	Jesper Modin; Emil Jönsson	19:18.7	Q
2	1	3	Canada	Devon Kershaw; Alex Harvey	19:19.3	Q
3	1	7	Germany	Jens Filbrich; Tim Tscharnke	19:19.6	Q
4	1	5	Finland	Sami Jauhojärvi; Ville Nousiainen	19:20.6	q
5	1	2	Italy	Renato Pasini; Loris Frasnelli	19:38.0	q
6	1	11	Slovakia	Ivan Bátory; Martin Bajčičák	20:19.4	
7	1	9	Austria	Max Hauke; Aurelius Herburger	20:19.8	
8	1	4	Switzerland	Jöri Kindschi; Christoph Eigenmann	20:28.9	
9	1	6	Poland	Maciej Kreczmer; Maciej Staręga	20:41.4	
10	1	13	New Zealand	Benjamin Koons; Nils Koons	20:52.1	
11	1	8	Lithuania	Aleksei Novoselski; Modestas Vaičiulis	20:53.3	
12	1	10	Ukraine	Ivan Bilosyuk; Oleksiy Shvidkiy	21:17.9	
	1	12	Venezuela	Cesar Baena; Bernardo Baena	LAP	

Semifinal 2

Rank	Heat	Bib	Country	Athletes	Time	Note
1	2	15	Russia	Alexander Panzhinskiy; Nikita Kryukov	19:39.5	Q
2	2	14	Norway	Petter Northug; Ola Vigen Hattestad	19:39.5	Q
3	2	20	Kazakhstan	Denis Volotka; Alexey Poltaranin	19:39.7	Q
4	2	19	France	Jean-Marc Gaillard; Cyril Miranda	19:41.4	q
5	2	17	United States	Torin Koos; Andrew Newell	19:43.9	q
6	2	21	Czech Republic	Petr Novák; Dušan Kožíšek	19:51.8	
7	2	16	Estonia	Peeter Kümmel; Kein Einaste	19:51.8	
8	2	18	Japan	Kouhei Shimizu; Yuichi Onda	20:08.0	
9	2	22	Slovenia	Boštjan Klavžar; Rok Tršan	20:33.6	
10	2	24	Australia	Ben Sim; Callum Watson	20:44.5	
11	2	23	Great Britain	Andrew Musgrave; Callum Smith	20:57.3	
12	2	25	Denmark	Lasse Hulgaard; Asger Fischer Mølgaard	22:37.4	
	2	26	Romania	Paul Constantin Pepene; Petrică Hogiu	DNS	

=== Final ===
Rank	Bib	Country	Athlete	Time	Deficit
1st place, gold medalist(s)	3	Canada	Devon Kershaw; Alex Harvey	19:10.0	
2nd place, silver medalist(s)	14	Norway	Petter Northug; Ola Vigen Hattestad	19:10.2	+0.2
3rd place, bronze medalist(s)	15	Russia	Alexander Panzhinskiy; Nikita Kryukov	19:10.5	+0.5
4	7	Germany	Jens Filbrich; Tim Tscharnke	19:10.9	+0.9
5	5	Finland	Sami Jauhojärvi; Ville Nousiainen	19:11.1	+1.1
6	20	Kazakhstan	Denis Volotka; Alexey Poltaranin	19:21.5	+11.5
7	1	Sweden	Jesper Modin; Emil Jönsson	19:22.0	+12.0
8	19	France	Jean-Marc Gaillard; Cyril Miranda	19:32.4	+22.4
9	2	Italy	Renato Pasini; Loris Frasnelli	19:39.1	+29.1
10	17	United States	Torin Koos; Andrew Newell	20:01.6	+51.6
