= Finland at the 2010 Winter Olympics =

- IOC code: FIN
- NOC: Finnish Olympic Committee
- Website: sport.fi/olympiakomitea (in Finnish and Swedish)

in Vancouver
- Competitors: 95 in 10 sports
- Flag bearers: Ville Peltonen (opening); Tanja Poutiainen (closing)
- Medals Ranked 24th: Gold 0 Silver 1 Bronze 4 Total 5

Winter Olympics appearances (overview)
- 1924; 1928; 1932; 1936; 1948; 1952; 1956; 1960; 1964; 1968; 1972; 1976; 1980; 1984; 1988; 1992; 1994; 1998; 2002; 2006; 2010; 2014; 2018; 2022; 2026

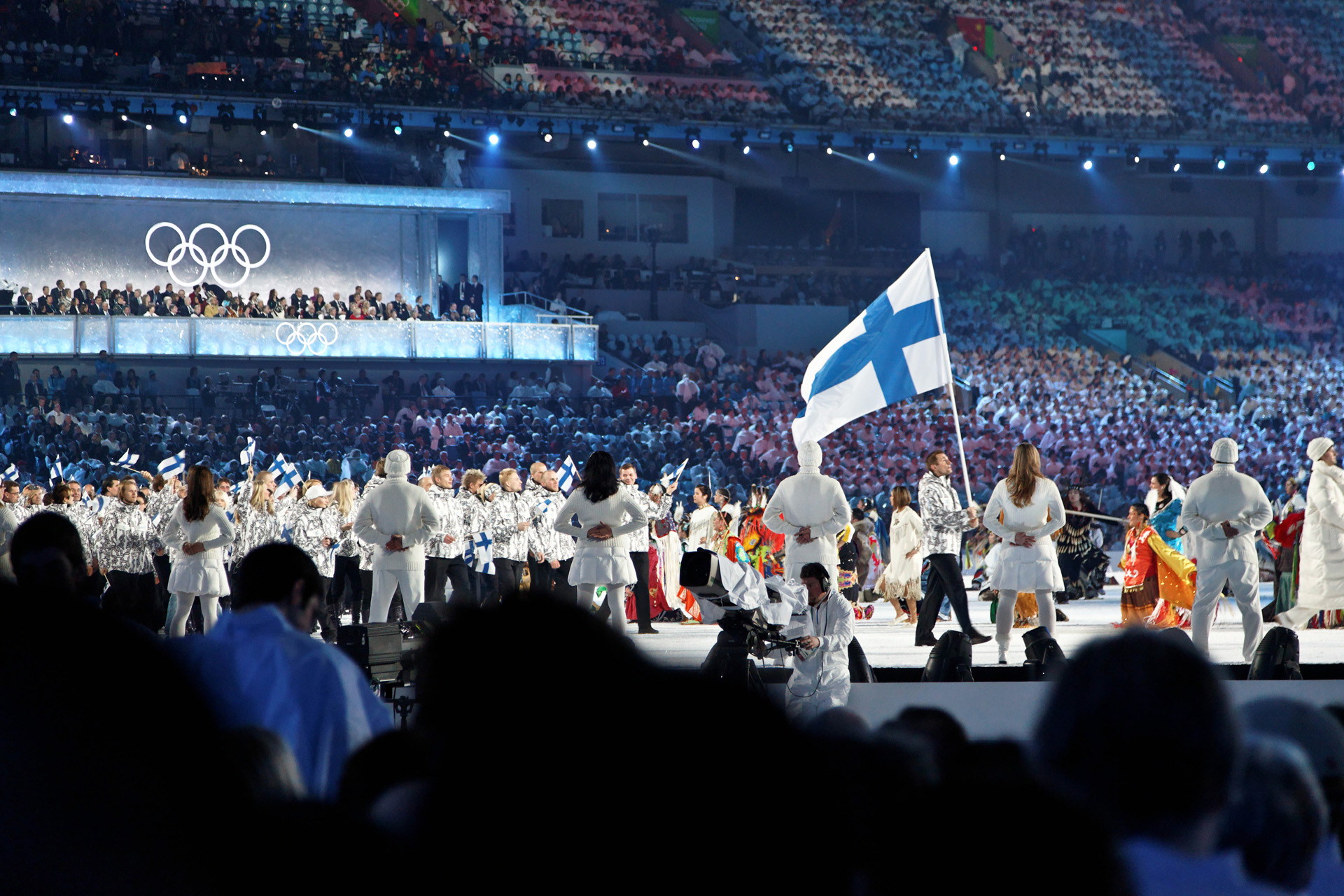
The athletes entering the stadium during the opening ceremonies

Finland participated at the 2010 Winter Olympics in Vancouver, British Columbia, Canada.

== Medalists ==
Medal	Name	Sport	Event	Date
Silver	Peetu Piiroinen	Snowboarding	Men's halfpipe	17 February
Bronze	Pirjo Muranen; Virpi Kuitunen; Riitta-Liisa Roponen; Aino-Kaisa Saarinen	Cross-country skiing	Women's 4 x 5 km relay	25 February
Bronze	Finland women's national ice hockey team: Anne Helin; Jenni Hiirikoski; Venla Hovi; Michelle Karvinen; Mira Kuisma; Emma Laaksonen; Rosa Lindstedt; Terhi Mertanen; Heidi Pelttari; Mariia Posa; Annina Rajahuhta; Karoliina Rantamäki; Noora Räty; Mari Saarinen; Saija Sirviö; Nina Tikkinen; Minnamari Tuominen; Saara Tuominen; Linda Välimäki; Anna Vanhatalo; Marjo Voutilainen	Ice hockey	Women's tournament	25 February
Bronze	Aino-Kaisa Saarinen	Cross-country skiing	30 km classical	27 February
Bronze	Finland men's national ice hockey team: Niklas Bäckström; Valtteri Filppula; Niklas Hagman; Jarkko Immonen; Olli Jokinen; Niko Kapanen; Miikka Kiprusoff; Mikko Koivu; Saku Koivu; Lasse Kukkonen; Jere Lehtinen; Sami Lepistö; Toni Lydman; Antti Miettinen; Antero Niittymäki; Janne Niskala; Ville Peltonen; Joni Pitkänen; Jarkko Ruutu; Tuomo Ruutu; Sami Salo; Teemu Selänne; Kimmo Timonen	Ice hockey	Men's tournament	27 February

== Review ==
The Finnish Olympic Committee had set a goal of 12 medals for the 2010 Winter Olympics, and considered the result of 5 medals far weaker than expected. By discipline, it summarized in its annual report: "The most positive results were achieved in ice hockey, snowboarding and figure skating, whereas the performances in cross-country skiing, ski jumping, Nordic combined and biathlon were clearly below the expected."

The central conclusions drawn by the Olympic committee on coaching issues on which to take action towards 2014 were:

- The role and leadership of head coaches were weak.
- The competence of the coaching of national sports federations was inadequate.
- The ratio of decentralized and centralized exercise was distorted.
- Know-how in mental training was weak.
- The emphasis of ski maintenance has elevated in winter sports.

== Alpine skiing ==
Athlete	Event	Final			
Athlete	Event	Run 1	Run 2	Total	Rank
Andreas Romar	Men's downhill	n/a		1:58.71	42
Andreas Romar	Men's super-G	n/a		Did not finish	
Andreas Romar	Men's giant slalom	1:19.79	1:22.52	2:42.31	30
Andreas Romar	Men's slalom	Did not finish			
Andreas Romar	Men's combined	2:00.89	Did not finish		
Marcus Sandell	Men's giant slalom	1:18.58	Did not finish		
Sanni Leinonen	Women's giant slalom	1:18.38	1:14.06	2:32.44	30
Sanni Leinonen	Women's slalom	Did not finish			
Tanja Poutiainen	Women's giant slalom	1:16.16	1:12.01	2:28.17	13
Tanja Poutiainen	Women's slalom	51.67	53.26	1:44.93	6

== Biathlon ==
Athlete	Event	Final		
Athlete	Event	Time	Misses	Rank
Timo Antila	Men's sprint	26:37.4	1	40
Timo Antila	Men's pursuit	38:22.1	6	52
Timo Antila	Men's individual	54:22.7	5	56
Mari Laukkanen	Women's sprint	22:45.0	4	68
Mari Laukkanen	Women's individual	45:36.4	3	43
Kaisa Mäkäräinen	Women's sprint	22:27.3	3	59
Kaisa Mäkäräinen	Women's pursuit	34:50.0	2	45
Kaisa Mäkäräinen	Women's individual	45:46.4	4	46
Paavo Puurunen	Men's sprint	28:04.8	4	73
Paavo Puurunen	Men's individual	54:15.7	3	53

== Cross-country skiing ==
Distance

Men

Athlete	Event	Final	
Athlete	Event	Time	Rank
Matti Heikkinen	15 km freestyle	35:37.1	39
Matti Heikkinen	30 km pursuit	Did not finish	
Sami Jauhojärvi	30 km pursuit	Did not finish	
Sami Jauhojärvi	50 km classical	2:06:43.2	20
Teemu Kattilakoski	15 km freestyle	35:06.8	27
Juha Lallukka	15 km freestyle	35:28.8	34
Lari Lehtonen	30 km pursuit	1:20:34.5	33
Lari Lehtonen	50 km classical	2:16:26.2	43
Ville Nousiainen	15 km freestyle	34:45.5	13
Ville Nousiainen	30 km pursuit	Did not finish	
Ville Nousiainen	50 km classical	2:11:38.0	37
Sami Jauhojärvi; Matti Heikkinen; Teemu Kattilakoski; Ville Nousiainen	4 x 10 km relay	1:45:30.3	5

Women

Athlete	Event	Final	
Athlete	Event	Time	Rank
Virpi Kuitunen	30 km classical	1:33:36.7	13
Krista Lähteenmäki	10 km freestyle	27:49.4	52
Krista Lähteenmäki	30 km classical	1:35:08.4	25
Pirjo Muranen	15 km pursuit	42:50.5	30
Riitta-Liisa Roponen	10 km freestyle	25:24.3	6
Riitta-Liisa Roponen	15 km pursuit	42:14.3	19
Aino-Kaisa Saarinen	10 km freestyle	25:59.5	15
Aino-Kaisa Saarinen	15 km pursuit	40:40.6	5
Aino-Kaisa Saarinen	30 km classical	1:31:38.7	3rd place, bronze medalist(s)
Riikka Sarasoja	10 km freestyle	26:50.2	31
Riikka Sarasoja	15 km pursuit	42:24.4	21
Riikka Sarasoja	30 km classical	1:33:33.2	12
Pirjo Muranen; Virpi Kuitunen; Riitta-Liisa Roponen; Aino-Kaisa Saarinen	4 x 5 km relay	55:49.9	3rd place, bronze medalist(s)

Sprint

Athlete	Event	Qualifying		Quarterfinal		Semifinal		Final	
Athlete	Event	Total	Rank	Total	Rank	Total	Rank	Total	Rank
Sami Jauhojärvi	Men's sprint	3:39.57	21 Q	3:36.9	2 Q	3:39.6	6	Did not advance	
Virpi Kuitunen	Women's sprint	3:43.72	6 Q	3:39.9	2 Q	3:46.4	5	Did not advance	
Kalle Lassila	Men's sprint	3:39.12	19 Q	3:42.2	2 Q	3:43.7	5	Did not advance	
Pirjo Muranen	Women's sprint	3:46.04	15 Q	3:41.7	5	Did not advance			
Kirsi Perälä	Women's sprint	3:48.08	20 Q	3:39.7	4	Did not advance			
Aino-Kaisa Saarinen	Women's sprint	3:38.82	2 Q	3:40.7	3	Did not advance			
Matias Strandvall	Men's sprint	3:42.74	37	Did not advance					
Jesse Väänänen	Men's sprint	3:39.21	20 Q	3:38.7	5	Did not advance			
Ville Nousiainen; Lasse Paakkonen	Men's team sprint	n/a				3:12.8	5 Q	3:17.6	10
Riitta-Liisa Roponen; Riikka Sarasoja	Women's team sprint	n/a				3:02.6	5 Q	3:00.9	8

== Figure skating ==
Finland has qualified one entrant in men's singles and two in ladies singles, for a total of three athletes.

Athlete(s)	Event	CD		SP/OD		FS/FD		Total	
Athlete(s)	Event	Points	Rank	Points	Rank	Points	Rank	Points	Rank
Ari-Pekka Nurmenkari	Men			44.62	30	Did not qualify		44.62	30
Kiira Korpi	Ladies'			52.96	17	108.61	11	161.57	11
Laura Lepistö	Ladies'			61.36	10	126.61	4	187.97	6

== Freestyle skiing ==
Athlete	Event	Qualifying		Final	
Athlete	Event	Points	Rank	Points	Rank
Arttu Kiramo	Men's moguls	23.78	12 Q	22.76	16
Tapio Luusua	Men's moguls	22.83	21	Did not advance	
Mikko Ronkainen	Men's moguls	23.00	20 Q	23.50	14

Ski cross

Athlete	Event	Qualifying		1/8 finals	Quarterfinals	Semifinals	Finals	
Athlete	Event	Time	Rank	Position	Position	Position	Position	Rank
Juha Haukkala	Men's ski cross	1:14.66	22 Q	3	Did not advance			

== Ice hockey ==
=== Men's tournament ===
Roster

The following is the Finnish roster in the men's ice hockey tournament of the 2010 Winter Olympics.

No.	Pos.	Name	Height	Weight	Birthdate	Birthplace	2009–10 team
33	G	Niklas Bäckström	185 cm (6 ft 1 in)	89 kg (196 lb)	13 February 1978	Helsinki	(United States) Minnesota Wild (NHL)
34	G	Miikka Kiprusoff	188 cm (6 ft 2 in)	85 kg (187 lb)	26 October 1976	Turku	(Canada) Calgary Flames (NHL)
30	G	Antero Niittymäki	185 cm (6 ft 1 in)	84 kg (185 lb)	18 June 1980	Turku	(United States) Tampa Bay Lightning (NHL)
5	D	Lasse Kukkonen	183 cm (6 ft 0 in)	85 kg (187 lb)	18 September 1981	Oulu	(Russia) Avangard Omsk (KHL)
18	D	Sami Lepistö	183 cm (6 ft 0 in)	80 kg (180 lb)	17 October 1984	Espoo	(United States) Phoenix Coyotes (NHL)
32	D	Toni Lydman	185 cm (6 ft 1 in)	92 kg (203 lb)	25 September 1977	Lahti	(United States) Buffalo Sabres (NHL)
21	D	Janne Niskala	184 cm (6 ft 0 in)	85 kg (187 lb)	22 September 1981	Västerås, Sweden	(Sweden) Frölunda Indians (SEL)
25	D	Joni Pitkänen	191 cm (6 ft 3 in)	97 kg (214 lb)	19 September 1983	Oulu	(United States) Carolina Hurricanes (NHL)
6	D	Sami Salo	191 cm (6 ft 3 in)	93 kg (205 lb)	2 September 1974	Turku	(Canada) Vancouver Canucks (NHL)
44	D	Kimmo Timonen – A	178 cm (5 ft 10 in)	88 kg (194 lb)	18 March 1975	Kuopio	(United States) Philadelphia Flyers (NHL)
51	F	Valtteri Filppula	183 cm (6 ft 0 in)	88 kg (194 lb)	20 March 1984	Vantaa	(United States) Detroit Red Wings (NHL)
10	F	Niklas Hagman	183 cm (6 ft 0 in)	93 kg (205 lb)	5 December 1979	Helsinki	(Canada) Calgary Flames (NHL)
62	F	Jarkko Immonen	183 cm (6 ft 0 in)	95 kg (209 lb)	19 April 1982	Rantasalmi	(Russia) Ak Bars Kazan (KHL)
12	F	Olli Jokinen	191 cm (6 ft 3 in)	98 kg (216 lb)	5 December 1978	Kuopio	(United States) New York Rangers (NHL)
39	F	Niko Kapanen	175 cm (5 ft 9 in)	82 kg (181 lb)	29 April 1978	Hattula	(Russia) Ak Bars Kazan (KHL)
9	F	Mikko Koivu	188 cm (6 ft 2 in)	91 kg (201 lb)	12 March 1983	Turku	(United States) Minnesota Wild (NHL)
11	F	Saku Koivu – C	178 cm (5 ft 10 in)	83 kg (183 lb)	23 November 1974	Turku	(United States) Anaheim Ducks (NHL)
26	F	Jere Lehtinen	183 cm (6 ft 0 in)	87 kg (192 lb)	24 June 1973	Espoo	(United States) Dallas Stars (NHL)
20	F	Antti Miettinen	183 cm (6 ft 0 in)	86 kg (190 lb)	3 July 1980	Hämeenlinna	(United States) Minnesota Wild (NHL)
16	F	Ville Peltonen	178 cm (5 ft 10 in)	83 kg (183 lb)	24 May 1973	Vantaa	(Belarus) Dynamo Minsk (KHL)
37	F	Jarkko Ruutu	185 cm (6 ft 1 in)	93 kg (205 lb)	23 August 1975	Vantaa	(Canada) Ottawa Senators (NHL)
15	F	Tuomo Ruutu	185 cm (6 ft 1 in)	96 kg (212 lb)	16 February 1983	Vantaa	(United States) Carolina Hurricanes (NHL)
8	F	Teemu Selänne – A	183 cm (6 ft 0 in)	93 kg (205 lb)	3 July 1970	Helsinki	(United States) Anaheim Ducks (NHL)

==== Group play ====
Finland played in Group C.

Round-robin

All times are local (UTC-8).

17 February 2010; 12:00	Finland	5–1 (2–0, 1–1, 2–0)	Belarus	Canada Hockey Place, Vancouver; Attendance: 16,639

Game reference

Miikka Kiprusoff
Goalies
Vitali Koval
Referees:
(Canada) Paul Devorski
(Slovakia) Peter Ország
Linesmen:
(United States) Brian Murphy
(Slovakia) Milan Novak

O. Jokinen (S. Koivu, T. Selänne) (PP) – 3:24	1–0
N. Hagman (M. Koivu, J. Pitkänen) (PP) – 17:50	2–0
	2–1	20:21 – S. Kostitsyn (S. Demagin)
N. Hagman (M. Koivu) – 36:52	3–1
V. Filppula (M. Koivu) – 40:23	4–1
J. Ruutu (L. Kukkonen, N. Kapanen) – 52:59	5–1

4 min
Penalties
12 min
45
Shots
12

19 February 2010; 21:00	Finland	5–0 (1–0, 2–0, 2–0)	Germany	Canada Hockey Place, Vancouver; Attendance: 16,662

Game reference

Niklas Bäckström
Goalies
Dimitri Pätzold
Referees:
(Russia) Vyacheslav Bulanov
(Canada) Brad Watson
Linesmen:
(United States) Shane Heyer
(Canada) Sylvain Losier

T. Ruutu (J. Niskala, N. Hagman) (PP) – 4:21	1–0
K. Timonen (S. Koivu, O. Jokinen) (PP) – 24:04	2–0
K. Timonen (S. Salo, T. Selänne) (PP) – 36:03	3–0
J. Ruutu (V. Peltonen, N. Kapanen) – 47:10	4–0
J. Pitkänen (N. Hagman) (PP) – 49:01	5–0

6 min
Penalties
12 min
35
Shots
24

21 February 2010; 21:00	Sweden	3–0 (1–0, 2–0, 0–0)	Finland	Canada Hockey Place, Vancouver; Attendance: 17,410

Game reference

Henrik Lundqvist
Goalies
Miikka Kiprusoff
Referees:
(Canada) Marc Joannette
(Switzerland) Danny Kurmann
Linesmen:
(United States) Tim Nowak
(Russia) Yuri Oskirko

L. Eriksson (N. Bäckström, M. Johansson) (PP2) – 6:41	1–0
N. Bäckström (D. Sedin) – 24:19	2–0
L. Eriksson (J. Franzén, N. Bäckström) (PP) – 38:08	3–0

14 min
Penalties
33 min
32
Shots
20

Standings

Team	Pld	W	OTW	OTL	L	GF	GA	GD	Pts	Qualification
Sweden	3	3	0	0	0	9	2	+7	9	Quarterfinals
Finland	3	2	0	0	1	10	4	+6	6	Quarterfinals
Belarus	3	1	0	0	2	8	12	−4	3	
Germany	3	0	0	0	3	3	12	−9	0	

Source: IIHF

==== Final rounds ====
Quarterfinal

24 February 2010; 19:00	Finland	2–0 (0–0, 0–0, 2–0)	Czech Republic	UBC Thunderbird Arena, Vancouver; Attendance: 5,461

Game reference
Miikka Kiprusoff	Goalies	Tomáš Vokoun	Referees: (Canada) Dan O'Halloran (Canada) Brad Watson; Linesmen: (Russia) Yuri Oskirko (Canada) Jay Sharrers
N. Hagman (J. Niskala) (PP) – 53:34 / 1–0; V. Filppula (M. Koivu) (EN) – 58:25 / 2–0			Referees: (Canada) Dan O'Halloran (Canada) Brad Watson; Linesmen: (Russia) Yuri Oskirko (Canada) Jay Sharrers
4 min	Penalties	12 min	Referees: (Canada) Dan O'Halloran (Canada) Brad Watson; Linesmen: (Russia) Yuri Oskirko (Canada) Jay Sharrers
31	Shots	31	Referees: (Canada) Dan O'Halloran (Canada) Brad Watson; Linesmen: (Russia) Yuri Oskirko (Canada) Jay Sharrers

Semifinal

26 February 2010; 12:00	United States	6–1 (6–0, 0–0, 0–1)	Finland	Canada Hockey Place, Vancouver; Attendance: 17,602

Game reference

Ryan Miller (out 48:29) / Tim Thomas (in 48:29)
Goalies
Miikka Kiprusoff (out 10:08) / Niklas Bäckström (in 10:08)
Referees:
(Canada) Dan O'Halloran
(Sweden) Marcus Vinnerborg
Linesmen:
(Czech Republic) Petr Blümel
(United States) Shane Heyer

R. Malone – 2:04	1–0
Z. Parise (P. Stastny, B. Rafalski) (PP) – 6:22	2–0
E. Johnson (J. Pavelski, R. Malone) (PP) – 8:36	3–0
P. Kane – 10:08	4–0
P. Kane (B. Rafalski) – 12:31	5–0
P. Stastny (J. Langenbrunner, Z. Parise) – 12:46	6–0
	6–1	54:46 – A. Miettinen (S. Lepistö) (PP)

6 min
Penalties
20 min
25
Shots
25

Bronze medal game

27 February 2010; 19:00	(bronze) Finland	5–3 (1–0, 0–3, 4–0)	Slovakia	Canada Hockey Place, Vancouver; Attendance: 17,322

Game reference

Miikka Kiprusoff
Goalies
Jaroslav Halák
Referees:
(Canada) Paul Devorski
(Canada) Brad Watson
Linesmen:
(Czech Republic) Petr Blümel
(Russia) Yuri Oskirko

S. Salo (PP) – 18:50	1–0
	1–1	29:56 – M. Gáborík (P. Demitra, Z. Chára) (PP)
	1–2	35:38 – Mari. Hossa (M. Handzuš, P. Demitra) (PP2)
	1–3	38:45 – P. Demitra (Mari. Hossa) (SH)
N. Hagman (K. Timonen) (PP) – 45:06	2–3
O. Jokinen (J. Ruutu) – 46:41	3–3
O. Jokinen (J. Pitkänen, M. Kiprusoff) (PP) – 48:41	4–3
V. Filppula (K. Timonen) (EN) – 59:49	5–3

14 min
Penalties
18 min
33
Shots
22

=== Women's tournament ===
Roster

The following is the Finnish roster in the women's ice hockey tournament of the 2010 Winter Olympics.

Position	Name	Height	Weight	Birthdate	Birthplace	2009–10 team
G	Mira Kuisma	168	65	6 May 1987	Kuopio	Oulun Kärpät
G	Noora Räty	164	68	29 May 1989	Espoo	Minnesota Golden Gophers
G	Anna Vanhatalo	178	65	29 February 1984	Helsinki	Espoo Blues
D	Jenni Hiirikoski – A	161	60	30 March 1987	Lempäälä	Ilves Tampere
D	Emma Laaksonen – C	159	59	17 December 1981	Washington, D.C., United States	Espoo Blues
D	Rosa Lindstedt	186	78	24 January 1988	Ylöjärvi	Ilves Tampere
D	Terhi Mertanen	166	68	4 April 1981	Joensuu	Espoo Blues
D	Heidi Pelttari	166	69	2 August 1985	Tampere	Ilves Tampere
D	Mariia Posa	164	58	21 February 1988	Hyvinkää	Minnesota Duluth Bulldogs
D	Saija Sirviö	172	62	29 December 1982	Oulu	Oulun Kärpät
F	Anne Helin	170	68	28 January 1987	Helsinki	Oulun Kärpät
F	Venla Hovi	169	62	28 October 1987	Tampere	Ilves Tampere
F	Michelle Karvinen	166	70	27 March 1990	Rødovre, Denmark	HC Rødovre
F	Annina Rajahuhta	164	62	8 March 1989	Helsinki	Ilves Tampere
F	Karoliina Rantamäki	163	65	23 February 1978	Espoo	SKIF Nizhny Novgorod
F	Mari Saarinen	172	67	30 July 1981	Kangasala	Ilves Tampere
F	Nina Tikkinen	170	67	6 February 1987	Salo	Minnesota State Mavericks
F	Minnamari Tuominen	165	67	26 June 1990	Helsinki	Ohio State Buckeyes
F	Saara Tuominen – A	169	65	1 January 1986	Ylöjärvi	Minnesota Duluth Bulldogs
F	Marjo Voutilainen	168	70	22 March 1981	Kuopio	Espoo Blues
F	Linda Välimäki	165	62	31 May 1990	Ylöjärvi	Ilves Tampere

==== Group play ====
Finland played in Group B.

Team	Pld	W	OTW	OTL	L	GF	GA	GD	Pts	Qualification
United States	3	3	0	0	0	31	1	+30	9	Semifinals
Finland	3	2	0	0	1	7	8	−1	6	Semifinals
Russia	3	1	0	0	2	3	19	−16	3	5–8th classification
China	3	0	0	0	3	3	16	−13	0	5–8th classification

Source: ESPN

Round-robin

All times are local (UTC-8).

14 February 2010; 16:30	Finland	5–1 (1–1, 2–0, 2–0)	Russia	UBC Winter Sports Centre, Vancouver; Attendance: 5,275

Game reference

Noora Räty
Goalies
Irina Gashennikova
Referee:
Mary Anne Gage (Canada)
Linesmen:
Heather Richardson (Canada)
Kerry Rumble (Canada)

	0–1	6:11 – Vafina (Burina) (PP)
Sirviö (Saarinen, Välimäki) (PP2) – 9:30	1–1
Voutilainen (Rantamäki) – 23:59	2–1
Hovi (Hiirikoski) – 37:36	3–1
Tikkinen (S. Tuominen, Karvinen) – 42:25	4–1
Tikkinen (Pelttari, Karvinen) (PP) – 49:32	5–1

14 min
Penalties
12 min
34
Shots
14

16 February 2010; 19:00	Finland	2–1 (0–1, 2–0, 0–0)	China	UBC Winter Sports Centre, Vancouver; Attendance: 5,317

Game reference

Noora Räty
Goalies
Shi Yao
Referee:
Joy Tottman (Great Britain)

	0–1	18:10 – Wang L. (SH)
Rantamäki (Pelttari, Lindstedt) (PP) – 29:13	1–1
Hovi – 34:02	2–1

10 min
Penalties
20 min
43
Shots
5

18 February 2010; 14:30	United States	6–0 (4–0, 1–0, 1–0)	Finland	UBC Winter Sports Centre, Vancouver; Attendance: 5,398

Game reference

Jessie Vetter
Goalies
Noora Räty
Referee:
Aina Høve (Norway)

Chu (Ruggiero) – 8:08	1–0
Engstrom (M. Lamoureux) (PP) – 10:47	2–0
Duggan (Darwitz, Marvin) – 11:29	3–0
Darwitz (Engstrom, Chesson) – 18:03	4–0
Knight (Darwitz) – 31:48	5–0
Thatcher (J. Lamoureux, Ruggiero) – 58:22	6–0

12 min
Penalties
6 min
42
Shots
23

==== Final rounds ====
Semifinal

22 February 2010; 17:00	Finland	0–5 (0–2, 0–1, 0–2)	Canada	Canada Hockey Place, Vancouver; Attendance: 16,324

Game reference

Noora Räty
Goalies
Shannon Szabados
Referee:
Nicole Hertrich (Canada)

0–1	5:22 – Piper (Agosta, Hefford)
0–2	14:36 – Irwin
0–3	36:21 – Agosta (Bonhomme, Hefford)
0–4	44:23 – Irwin (Johnston, Vaillancourt)
0–5	58:57 – Ouellette (Poulin) (SH)

12 min
Penalties
10 min
11
Shots
50

Bronze medal game

25 February 2010; 11:00	Sweden	2–3 (OT) (0–0, 1–2, 1–0, 0–1)	Finland (bronze)	Canada Hockey Place, Vancouver; Attendance: 16,398

Game reference

Sara Grahn
Goalies
Noora Räty
Referee:
Nicole Hertrich (Germany)

	0–1	24:24 – Pelttari
Rooth (Jordansson, Eliasson) (PP) – 32:24	1–1
	1–2	36:02 – Karvinen (Välimäki)
Rundqvist (G. Andersson, Holmlöv) (PP) – 45:09	2–2
	2–3	62:33 – Rantamäki (Tuominen, Hiirikoski)

12 min
Penalties
14 min
18
Shots
24

== Nordic combined ==
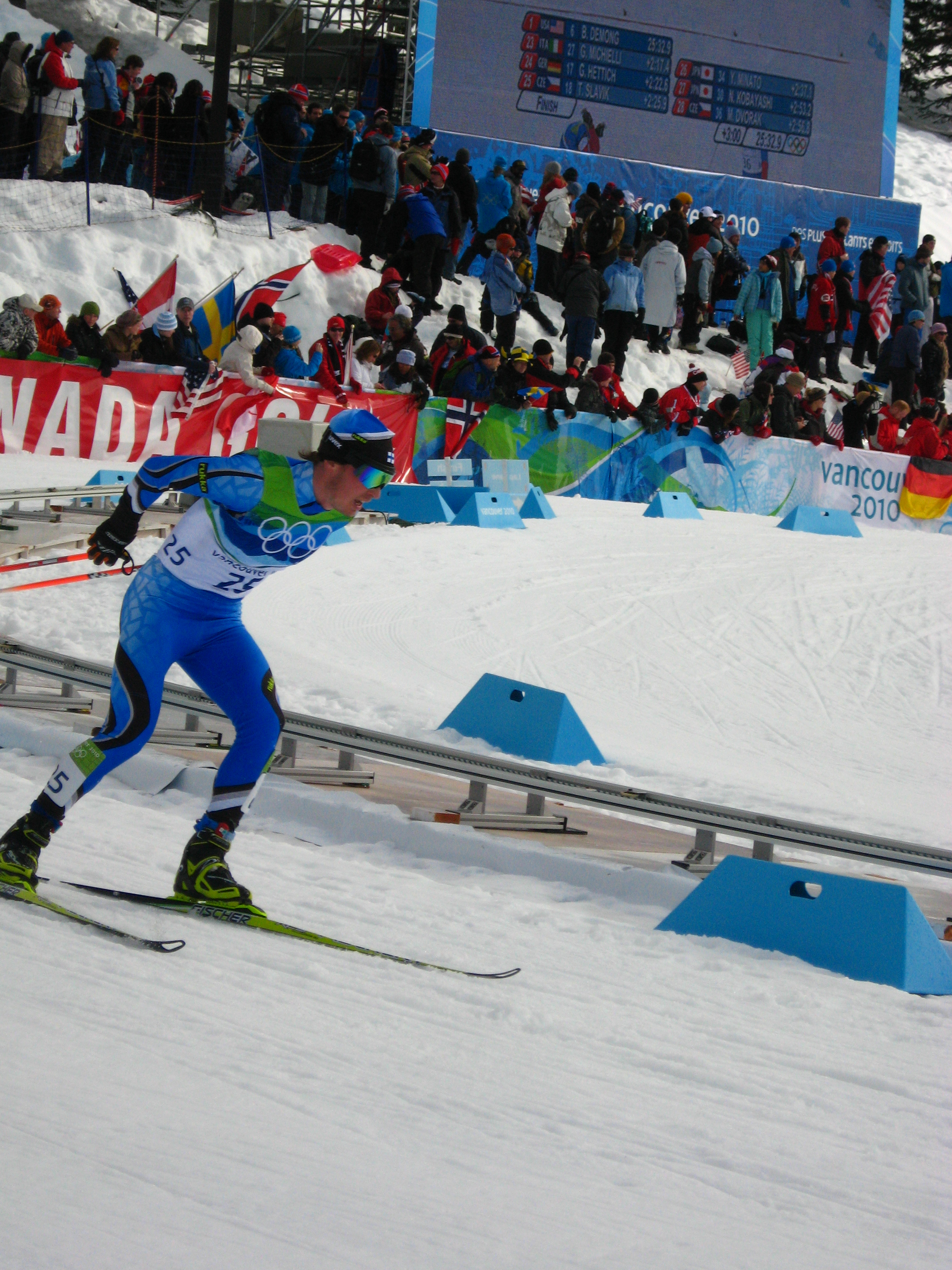
Jaakko Tallus in individual large hill/10 km.

Athlete	Event	Ski Jumping		Cross-Country		
Athlete	Event	Points	Rank	Deficit	Time	Rank
Anssi Koivuranta	Individual normal hill/10 km	122.0	8	0:54	25:22.9	8
Anssi Koivuranta	Individual large hill/10 km	66.3	44	4:03	Did not finish	
Hannu Manninen	Individual normal hill/10 km	116.0	22	1:18	25:12.4	13
Hannu Manninen	Individual large hill/10 km	107.7	16	1:17	24:49.0	4
Janne Ryynänen	Individual normal hill/10 km	135.5	1	-	27:21.6	26
Janne Ryynänen	Individual large hill/10 km	117.0	3	0:40	26:00.9	12
Jaakko Tallus	Individual normal hill/10 km	119.5	19	1:04	27:21.1	38
Jaakko Tallus	Individual large hill/10 km	95.8	25	2:05	26:51.1	32
Finland; Anssi Koivuranta; Hannu Manninen; Janne Ryynänen; Jaakko Tallus	Team	507.0; 132.0; 120.5; 134.2; 120.3	1	-	51:53.1; 13:12.9; 13:20.8; 12:32.6; 12:46.8	7

== Ski jumping ==
Athlete	Event	Qualifying		First round		Final		
Athlete	Event	Points	Rank	Points	Rank	Points	Total	Rank
Janne Ahonen	Normal hill	Prequalified		129.5	5 Q	133.5	263.0	4
Janne Ahonen	Large hill	Prequalified		111.0	16 Q	111.0	DNS	31
Janne Happonen	Normal hill	133.0	8 Q	117.5	25 Q	124.0	241.5	19
Janne Happonen	Large hill	128.4	13 Q	Disqualified				
Matti Hautamäki	Large hill	Prequalified		121.5	7 Q	134.0	202.4	26
Kalle Keituri	Normal hill	130.0	11 Q	116.0	27 Q	122.0	238.0	22
Harri Olli	Normal hill	133.5	6 Q	Disqualified				
Harri Olli	Large hill	135.6	9 Q	95.6	30 Q	122.2	217.8	18
Finland; Matti Hautamäki; Janne Happonen; Kalle Keituri; Harri Olli	Team	n/a		490.2; 129.8; 109.5; 108.4; 131.7	4 Q	524.4; 123.5; 112.2; 126.6; 132.1	1014.6	4

Note: PQ indicates a skier was pre-qualified for the final, based on entry rankings.

== Snowboarding ==
Halfpipe

Athlete	Event	Qualifying			Semifinal			Final		
Athlete	Event	Run 1	Run 2	Rank	Run 1	Run 2	Rank	Run 1	Run 2	Rank
Janne Korpi	Men's halfpipe	26.5	15.6	11	Did not advance					24
Markku Koski	Men's halfpipe	36.9	41.3	4 QF	Advanced to final			36.4	25.0	6
Markus Malin	Men's halfpipe	32.8	36.7	8 QS	42.9	21.9	1 Q	16.7	18.6	11
Peetu Piiroinen	Men's halfpipe	44.0	45.1	1 Q	Advanced to final			40.8	45.0	2nd place, silver medalist(s)

Parallel GS

Athlete	Event	Qualification		Round of 16	Quarterfinals	Semifinals	Finals	
Athlete	Event	Time	Rank	Opposition Time	Opposition Time	Opposition Time	Opposition Time	Rank
Ilona Ruotsalainen	Women's parallel giant slalom	1:26.66	23	Did not advance				23

== Speed skating ==
Athlete	Event	Race 1		Race 2		Final	
Athlete	Event	Time	Rank	Time	Rank	Time	Rank
Pekka Koskela	Men's 500 m	35.943	28	36.535	36	72.478	33
Tuomas Nieminen	Men's 500 m	35.940	27	36.047	27	71.987	27
Tuomas Nieminen	Men's 1000 m	n/a				1:12.26	34
Mika Poutala	Men's 500 m	34.863	1	35.181	11	70.044	5
Mika Poutala	Men's 1000 m	n/a				1:09.85	8
Markus Puolakka	Men's 500 m	36.152	32	36.204	31	72.356	30

== See also ==
- Finland at the 2010 Winter Paralympics
