= Alexander Panzhinskiy =

Russian cross country skier (born 1989)

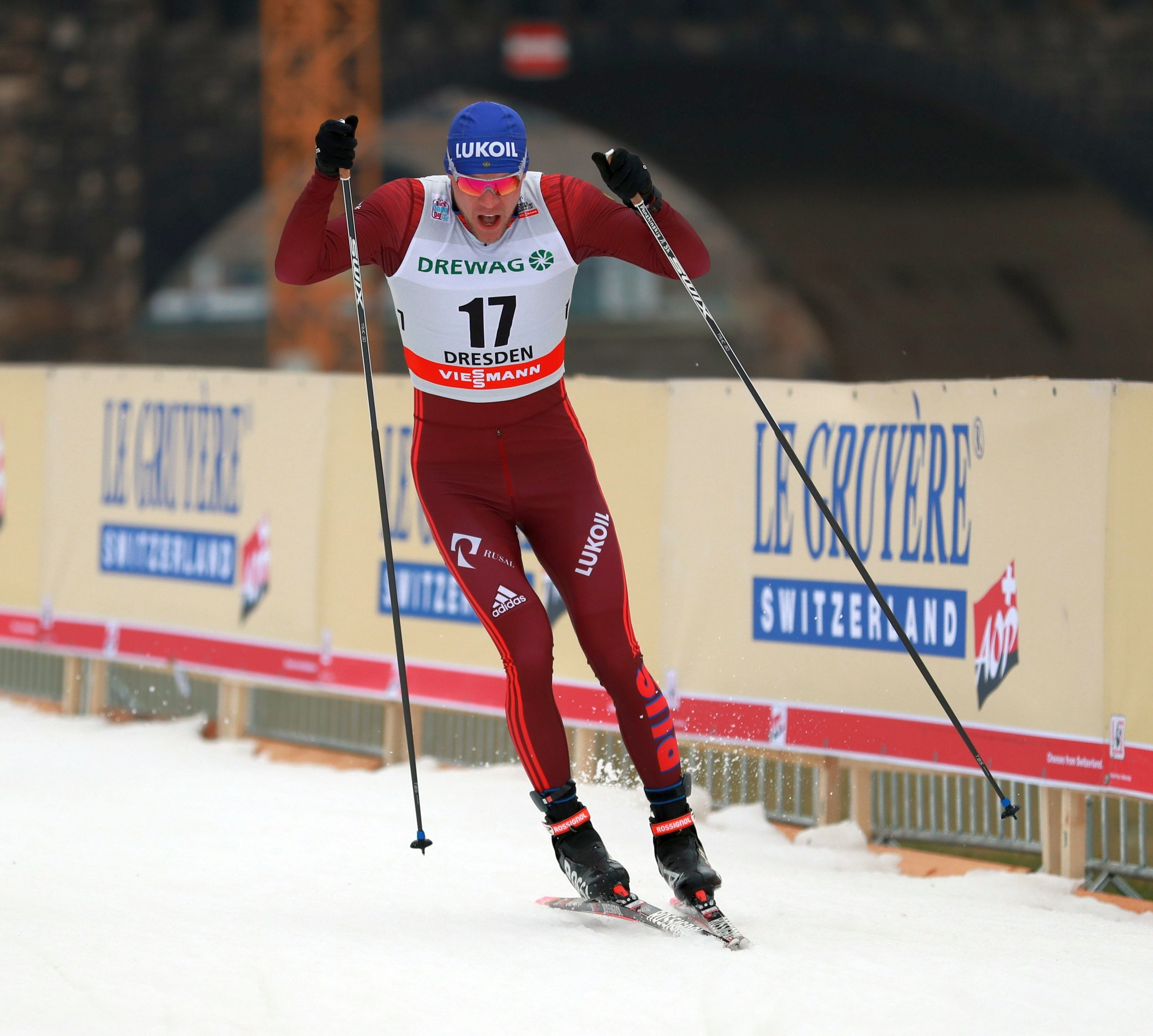
- Alexander Panzhinskiy in 2018

Personal information
- Full name: Alexander Eduardovich Panzhinskiy
- Nationality: Russia
- Born: 16 March 1989 (age 37) Khabarovsk, Soviet Union

Sport
- Sport: Skiing

World Cup career
- Seasons: 10 – (2009–2018)
- Indiv. starts: 52
- Indiv. podiums: 0
- Team starts: 5
- Team podiums: 0
- Overall titles: 0 – (43rd in 2010)
- Discipline titles: 0
Medal record
Men's cross-country skiing
Representing Russia
Olympic Games
Silver medal – second place	2010 Vancouver	Individual sprint
World Championships
Bronze medal – third place	2011 Oslo	Team sprint
U23 World Championships
Gold medal – first place	2011 Otepää	Individual sprint
Junior World Championships
Gold medal – first place	2009 Praz de Lys-Sommand	Individual sprint

Alexander Eduardovich Panzhinskiy (Russian: Александр Эдуардович Панжинский; born 16 March 1989) is a Russian cross-country skier who has competed since 2007. His best World Cup finish was fifth in a sprint event in Estonia in January 2010.

== Career ==
In the 2010 Olympics, Panzhinskiy finished second in the sprint, behind fellow Russian Nikita Kryukov.

In the 2011 World Championships in Holmenkollen, Panzhinskiy finished third in the team sprint event, together with his teammate Kryukov.

== Cross-country skiing results ==
All results are sourced from the International Ski Federation (FIS).

=== Olympic Games ===
- 1 medal – (1 silver)

Year	Age	15 km individual	30 km skiathlon	50 km mass start	Sprint	4 × 10 km relay	Team sprint
2010	20	—	—	—	Silver	—	—
2018	28	—	—	—	11	—	—

=== World Championships ===
- 1 medal – (1 bronze)

Year	Age	15 km individual	30 km skiathlon	50 km mass start	Sprint	4 × 10 km relay	Team sprint
2011	21	—	—	—	—	—	Bronze
2013	23	—	—	—	26	—	—
2015	25	—	—	—	34	—	—

=== World Cup ===
==== Season standings ====
Season	Age	Discipline standings			Ski Tour standings			
Season	Age	Overall	Distance	Sprint	Nordic Opening	Tour de Ski	World Cup Final	Ski Tour Canada
2009	19	136	—	81	—N/a	—	—	—N/a
2010	20	43	—	16	—N/a	—	DNF	—N/a
2011	21	95	—	51	DNF	—	—	—N/a
2012	22	67	—	26	—	—	—	—N/a
2013	23	102	—	53	—	—	—	—N/a
2014	24	89	—	41	—	—	—	—N/a
2015	25	62	—	23	—	—	—N/a	—N/a
2016	26	67	—	30	—	—	—N/a	—
2017	27	63	—	23	—	—	—	—N/a
2018	28	77	—	34	—	—	—	—N/a
