= Väänänen =

Väänänen is a Finnish surname. Notable people with the surname include:

- Ari Väänänen (born 1947), Finnish long jumper
- Emma Väänänen (1907–1970), Finnish actress
- Iivar Väänänen (1887–1959), Finnish sport shooter
- Jesse Väänänen (born 1984), Finnish cross country skier
- Jouko Väänänen (born 1950), Finnish mathematical logician
- Jussi Väänänen, Finnish dancer
- Kari Väänänen (born 1953), Finnish actor
- Marjatta Väänänen (1923–2020), Finnish politician
- Ossi Väänänen (born 1980), Finnish ice hockey player

== See also ==
- Näkymätön Viänänen, a comic strip by Jorma "Jope" Pitkänen
