= Cross-country skiing at the 2014 Winter Olympics – Men's sprint =

Men's sprint at the XXII Olympic Winter Games
- Venue: Laura Biathlon & Ski Complex
- Dates: 11 February 2014
- Competitors: 86 from 40 nations
- Winning time: 3:38.39

Medalists
1st place, gold medalist(s)		Ola Vigen Hattestad	Norway
2nd place, silver medalist(s)		Teodor Peterson	Sweden
3rd place, bronze medalist(s)		Emil Jönsson	Sweden

The men's freestyle sprint cross-country skiing competition in the free technique at the 2014 Sochi Olympics took place on 11 February at Laura Biathlon & Ski Complex. Ola Vigen Hattestad won the gold medal.

== Qualification ==
An athlete with a maximum of 100 FIS distance points (the A standard) will be allowed to compete in both or one of the events (sprint/distance). An athlete with a maximum 120 FIS sprint points will be allowed to compete in the sprint event and 10 km for women or 15 km for men provided their distance points do not exceed 300 FIS points. NOC's who do not have any athlete meeting the A standard can enter one competitor of each sex (known as the basic quota) in only 10 km classical event for women or 15 km classical event for men. They must have a maximum of 300 FIS distance points at the end of qualifying on January 20, 2014. The qualification period began in July 2012.

== Results ==
Q — qualified for next round
LL — lucky loser
PF — photo finish

In November 2017, Alexey Petukhov was disqualified from the event.

=== Qualifying ===
Rank	Bib	Athlete	Country	Time	Deficit	Note
1	1	Ola Vigen Hattestad	Norway	3:28.35	—	Q
2	5	Sergey Ustiugov	Russia	3:30.26	+1.91	Q
3	6	Federico Pellegrino	Italy	3:30.38	+2.03	Q
4	10	Anders Gløersen	Norway	3:30.41	+2.06	Q
5	9	Emil Jönsson	Sweden	3:30.77	+2.42	Q
6	20	Teodor Peterson	Sweden	3:31.43	+3.08	Q
7	8	Eirik Brandsdal	Norway	3:32.53	+4.18	Q
8	26	Bernhard Tritscher	Austria	3:32.60	+4.25	Q
9	18	Alexey Petukhov	Russia	3:32.67	+4.32	Q
10	17	Calle Halfvarsson	Sweden	3:33.11	+4.76	Q
11	13	Nikita Kryukov	Russia	3:34.04	+5.69	Q
12	4	Martti Jylhä	Finland	3:34.49	+6.14	Q
13	38	Dario Cologna	Switzerland	3:35.03	+6.68	Q
14	28	Renaud Jay	France	3:35.16	+6.81	Q
15	56	Marcus Hellner	Sweden	3:35.38	+7.03	Q
16	3	Petter Northug	Norway	3:35.44	+7.09	Q
17	11	Andrew Newell	United States	3:35.52	+7.17	Q
18	44	David Hofer	Italy	3:35.68	+7.33	Q
19	14	Alex Harvey	Canada	3:36.08	+7.73	Q
20	22	Anton Gafarov	Russia	3:36.10	+7.75	Q
21	15	Simi Hamilton	United States	3:36.12	+7.77	Q
22	36	Cyril Miranda	France	3:36.59	+8.24	Q
23	2	Jöri Kindschi	Switzerland	3:36.89	+8.54	Q
24	30	Harald Wurm	Austria	3:37.18	+8.83	Q
25	37	Ville Nousiainen	Finland	3:37.52	+9.17	Q
26	39	Sun Qinghai	China	3:37.71	+9.36	Q
27	27	Andrew Musgrave	Great Britain	3:37.75	+9.40	Q
28	19	Tim Tscharnke	Germany	3:37.75	+9.40	Q
29	35	Cyril Gaillard	France	3:37.86	+9.51	Q
30	25	Nikolay Chebotko	Kazakhstan	3:37.88	+9.53	Q
31	12	Josef Wenzl	Germany	3:38.10	+9.75	
32	61	Thomas Bing	Germany	3:38.30	+9.95	
33	52	Roman Ragozin	Kazakhstan	3:38.56	+10.21	
34	24	Anssi Pentsinen	Finland	3:38.66	+10.31	
35	16	Sebastian Eisenlauer	Germany	3:39.00	+10.65	
36	32	Len Väljas	Canada	3:39.87	+11.52	
37	42	Torin Koos	United States	3:40.27	+11.92	
37	48	Dietmar Nöckler	Italy	3:40.27	+11.92	
39	54	Erik Bjornsen	United States	3:40.39	+12.04	
40	31	Baptiste Gros	France	3:40.54	+12.19	
41	50	Dušan Kožíšek	Czech Republic	3:40.56	+12.21	
42	49	Andrew Young	Great Britain	3:40.68	+12.33	
43	43	Juho Mikkonen	Finland	3:40.72	+12.37	
44	41	Enrico Nizzi	Italy	3:40.89	+12.54	
45	33	Yuichi Onda	Japan	3:40.98	+12.63	
46	55	Max Hauke	Austria	3:41.55	+13.20	
47	7	Jovian Hediger	Switzerland	3:42.34	+13.99	
48	58	Michail Semenov	Belarus	3:42.93	+14.58	
49	29	Aleš Razym	Czech Republic	3:43.24	+14.89	
50	62	Ruslan Perekhoda	Ukraine	3:43.61	+15.26	
51	45	Raido Ränkel	Estonia	3:43.82	+15.47	
52	34	Peeter Kümmel	Estonia	3:44.03	+15.68	
53	51	Jesse Cockney	Canada	3:44.36	+16.01	
54	64	Martin Møller	Denmark	3:44.38	+16.03	
55	53	Phillip Bellingham	Australia	3:45.65	+17.30	
56	40	Devon Kershaw	Canada	3:45.77	+17.42	
57	63	Sebastian Gazurek	Poland	3:46.12	+17.77	
58	46	Denis Volotka	Kazakhstan	3:46.92	+18.57	
59	47	Siim Sellis	Estonia	3:48.06	+19.71	
60	69	Imanol Rojo	Spain	3:48.44	+20.09	
61	65	Arvis Liepiņš	Latvia	3:49.28	+20.93	
62	77	Callum Smith	Great Britain	3:50.13	+21.78	
63	78	Milanko Petrović	Serbia	3:50.20	+21.85	
64	68	Andrey Gridin	Bulgaria	3:50.57	+22.22	
65	71	Paul Constantin Pepene	Romania	3:51.54	+23.19	
66	57	Peter Mlynár	Slovakia	3:51.76	+23.41	
67	21	Maciej Staręga	Poland	3:51.84	+23.49	
68	74	Florin Daniel Pripici	Romania	3:52.68	+24.33	
69	75	Edi Dadić	Croatia	3:52.89	+24.54	
70	73	Vytautas Strolia	Lithuania	3:55.48	+27.13	
71	60	Jānis Paipals	Latvia	3:56.21	+27.86	
72	72	Sævar Birgisson	Iceland	3:59.50	+31.15	
73	67	Milán Szabó	Hungary	3:59.68	+31.33	
74	80	Apostolos Angelis	Greece	4:01.87	+33.52	
75	79	Sabahattin Oğlago	Turkey	4:02.03	+33.68	
76	81	Rejhan Šmrković	Serbia	4:02.28	+33.93	
77	83	Victor Pînzaru	Moldova	4:04.91	+36.56	
78	86	Darko Damjanovski	Macedonia	4:08.56	+40.21	
79	66	Kari Peters	Luxembourg	4:13.08	+44.73	
80	82	Leandro Ribela	Brazil	4:21.12	+52.77	
81	70	Oleksiy Krasovsky	Ukraine	4:35.08	+1:06.73	
82	85	Mladen Plakalović	Bosnia and Herzegovina	4:40.64	+1:12.29	
83	23	Roman Schaad	Switzerland	4:56.63	+1:28.28	
84	84	Yonathan Fernandez	Chile	4:58.63	+1:30.28	
85	76	Callum Watson	Australia	5:29.62	+2:01.27	
	59	Xu Wenlong	China	DNF		

=== Quarterfinals ===
Quarterfinal 1

Rank	Seed	Athlete	Country	Time	Deficit	Note
1	1	Ola Vigen Hattestad	Norway	3:37.99	—	Q
2	20	Anton Gafarov	Russia	3:38.52	+0.53	Q
3	11	Nikita Kryukov	Russia	3:39.10	+1.11	PF
4	10	Calle Halfvarsson	Sweden	3:39.13	+1.14	PF
5	30	Nikolay Chebotko	Kazakhstan	3:39.66	+1.67	
6	21	Simi Hamilton	United States	3:39.83	+1.84	

Quarterfinal 2

Rank	Seed	Athlete	Country	Time	Deficit	Note
1	4	Anders Gløersen	Norway	3:36.28	—	Q
2	7	Eirik Brandsdal	Norway	3:36.59	+0.31	Q
3	14	Renaud Jay	France	3:37.00	+0.72	
4	17	Andrew Newell	United States	3:37.12	+0.84	
5	24	Harald Wurm	Austria	3:38.32	+2.04	
6	27	Andrew Musgrave	Great Britain	3:48.69	+12.41	

Quarterfinal 3

Rank	Seed	Athlete	Country	Time	Deficit	Note
1	5	Emil Jönsson	Sweden	3:33.20	—	Q
2	6	Teodor Peterson	Sweden	3:33.34	+0.14	Q
3	15	Marcus Hellner	Sweden	3:33.62	+0.42	LL
4	17	Petter Northug	Norway	3:36.70	+3.50	LL
5	25	Ville Nousiainen	Finland	3:40.84	+7.64	
6	26	Sun Qinghai	China	3:47.26	+14.06	

Quarterfinal 4

Rank	Seed	Athlete	Country	Time	Deficit	Note
1	2	Sergey Ustiugov	Russia	3:36.14	—	Q
2	9	Alexey Petukhov	Russia	3:36.39	+0.25	Q
3	22	Cyril Miranda	France	3:37.57	+1.43	
4	19	Alex Harvey	Canada	3:37.89	+1.75	
5	12	Martti Jylhä	Finland	3:37.98	+1.84	
6	29	Cyril Gaillard	France	3:40.77	+4.63	

Quarterfinal 5

Rank	Seed	Athlete	Country	Time	Deficit	Note
1	3	Federico Pellegrino	Italy	3:43.97	—	Q, PF
2	8	Bernhard Tritscher	Austria	3:44.01	+0.04	Q, PF
3	18	David Hofer	Italy	3:44.87	+0.90	
4	28	Tim Tscharnke	Germany	3:46.81	+2.84	
5	23	Jöri Kindschi	Switzerland	3:47.94	+3.97	
6	13	Dario Cologna	Switzerland	4:39.69	+55.72	

=== Semifinals ===
Semifinal 1

Rank	Seed	Athlete	Country	Time	Deficit	Note
1	1	Ola Vigen Hattestad	Norway	3:36.33	—	Q
2	6	Teodor Peterson	Sweden	3:36.48	+0.15	Q
3	4	Anders Gløersen	Norway	3:36.95	+0.62	LL, PF
4	15	Marcus Hellner	Sweden	3:36.98	+0.65	LL, PF
5	7	Eirik Brandsdal	Norway	3:37.09	+0.76	
6	20	Anton Gafarov	Russia	6:25.95	+2:49.62	

Semifinal 2

Rank	Seed	Athlete	Country	Time	Deficit	Note
1	2	Sergey Ustiugov	Russia	3:37.37	—	Q, PF
2	5	Emil Jönsson	Sweden	3:37.43	+0.06	Q, PF
3	8	Bernhard Tritscher	Austria	3:37.64	+0.27	
4	9	Alexey Petukhov	Russia	3:37.89	+0.52	
5	16	Petter Northug	Norway	3:54.28	+16.91	
6	3	Federico Pellegrino	Italy	3:55.99	+18.62	

=== Final ===
The final was held at 17:40.

Rank	Seed	Athlete	Country	Time	Deficit	Note
1st place, gold medalist(s)	1	Ola Vigen Hattestad	Norway	3:38.39	—	
2nd place, silver medalist(s)	6	Teodor Peterson	Sweden	3:39.61	+1.22	
3rd place, bronze medalist(s)	5	Emil Jönsson	Sweden	3:58.13	+19.74	
4	4	Anders Gløersen	Norway	4:02.05	+23.66	
5	2	Sergey Ustiugov	Russia	4:32.48	+54.09	
6	15	Marcus Hellner	Sweden	5:24.31	+1:45.92	
