= Peter von Allmen =

Swiss cross-country skier (born 1978)

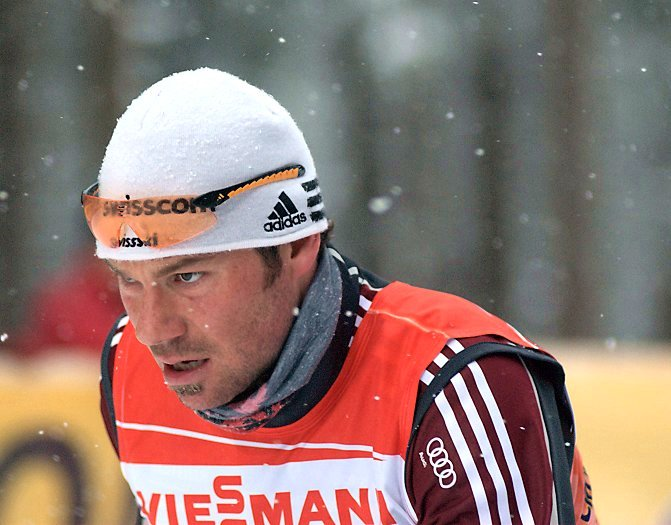
- Peter von Allmen in Oberhof, 2010

Personal information
- Nationality: Switzerland
- Born: 21 January 1978 (age 48) Münsingen, West Germany

Sport
- Sport: Skiing
- Club: SC Bex

World Cup career
- Seasons: 2000–2010
- Indiv. starts: 71
- Indiv. podiums: 0
- Team starts: 12
- Team podiums: 0
- Overall titles: 0 – (65th in 2003)
- Discipline titles: 0

Peter von Allmen (born 21 January 1978) is a Swiss cross-country skier who has been competing since 1997. At the 2010 Winter Olympics in Vancouver he finished 43rd in the individual sprint event.

Von Allmen's best finish at the FIS Nordic World Ski Championships was 16th in the individual sprint event at Val di Fiemme in 2003.

His best World Cup finish was fifth in an individual sprint event at Sweden in 2007.

Von Almen also competes in ski mountaineering events. In 2010, 5th, he finished 1st in the "seniors I" class ranking and 6th in the total ranking at the 14th Patrouille des Glaciers race, together with Stéphane Gay and Andreas Buchs.

== Olympic results ==
Year	Age	15 km individual	30 km skiathlon	50 km mass start	Sprint	4 × 10 km relay	Team sprint
2010	32	—	—	—	43	—	—

== World Cup results ==
All results are sourced from the International Ski Federation (FIS).

=== World Cup standings ===
Season	Age	Season standings					Ski Tour standings	
Season	Age	Overall	Distance	Long Distance	Middle Distance	Sprint	Tour de Ski	World Cup Final
2000	22	NC	—N/a	DNP	DNP	NC	—N/a	—N/a
2001	23	NC	—N/a	—N/a	—N/a	NC	—N/a	—N/a
2002	24	113	—N/a	—N/a	—N/a	57	—N/a	—N/a
2003	25	65	—N/a	—N/a	—N/a	34	—N/a	—N/a
2004	26	79	DNP	—N/a	—N/a	36	—N/a	—N/a
2005	27	82	DNP	—N/a	—N/a	39	—N/a	—N/a
2006	28	98	DNP	—N/a	—N/a	39	—N/a	—N/a
2007	29	72	DNP	—N/a	—N/a	34	DNP	—N/a
2008	30	101	DNP	—N/a	—N/a	66	DNP	DNP
2009	31	142	DNP	—N/a	—N/a	84	DNP	DNP
2010	32	125	NC	—N/a	—N/a	67	DNF	DNP
