= Strolia =

Strolia is a Lithuanian surname. Notable people with the surname include:

- Mantas Strolia (born 1986), Lithuanian Olympic cross-country skier
- Vytautas Strolia (born 1992), Lithuanian Olympic cross-country skier
