= Lasse Paakkonen =

Finnish cross-country skier

Personal information
- Nationality: Finland
- Born: 8 July 1986 (age 40) Raahe, Finland
- Height: 1.80 m (5 ft 11 in)

Sport
- Sport: Skiing
- Club: Pyhäjärven Pohti

World Cup career
- Seasons: 9 – (2009–2017)
- Indiv. starts: 41
- Indiv. podiums: 0
- Team starts: 7
- Team podiums: 0
- Overall titles: 0 – (70th in 2010)
- Discipline titles: 0

Lasse Paakkonen (born 8 July 1986 in Raahe) is a Finnish cross-country skier who has been competing since he was seven years old. He finished tenth in the team sprint event at the 2010 Winter Olympics in Vancouver, British Columbia, Canada.

Paakkonen's best World Cup finish was 15th in an individual sprint event at Germany in 2009. Although concentrating in the sprint event, he has also won National Championship medals in long-distance events.

Paakkonen lives in Jyväskylä, Finland. He studies in the University of Jyväskylä School of Business with Marketing as his major.

== Cross-country skiing results ==
All results are sourced from the International Ski Federation (FIS).

=== Olympic Games ===
Year	Age	15 km individual	30 km skiathlon	50 km mass start	Sprint	4 × 10 km relay	Team sprint
2010	23	—	—	—	—	—	10

=== World Cup ===
==== Season standings ====
Season	Age	Discipline standings			Ski Tour standings			
Season	Age	Overall	Distance	Sprint	Nordic Opening	Tour de Ski	World Cup Final	Ski Tour Canada
2009	22	147	—	85	—N/a	—	—	—N/a
2010	23	70	NC	28	—N/a	—	—	—N/a
2011	24	106	NC	59	DNF	—	—	—N/a
2012	25	95	NC	47	DNF	—	—	—N/a
2013	26	NC	—	NC	—	—	—	—N/a
2014	27	NC	—	NC	—	—	—	—N/a
2015	28	147	NC	90	—	—	—N/a	—N/a
2016	29	111	NC	70	80	—	—N/a	—
2017	30	140	—	75	—	—	—	—N/a
