= Jöri Kindschi =

Swiss cross-country skier

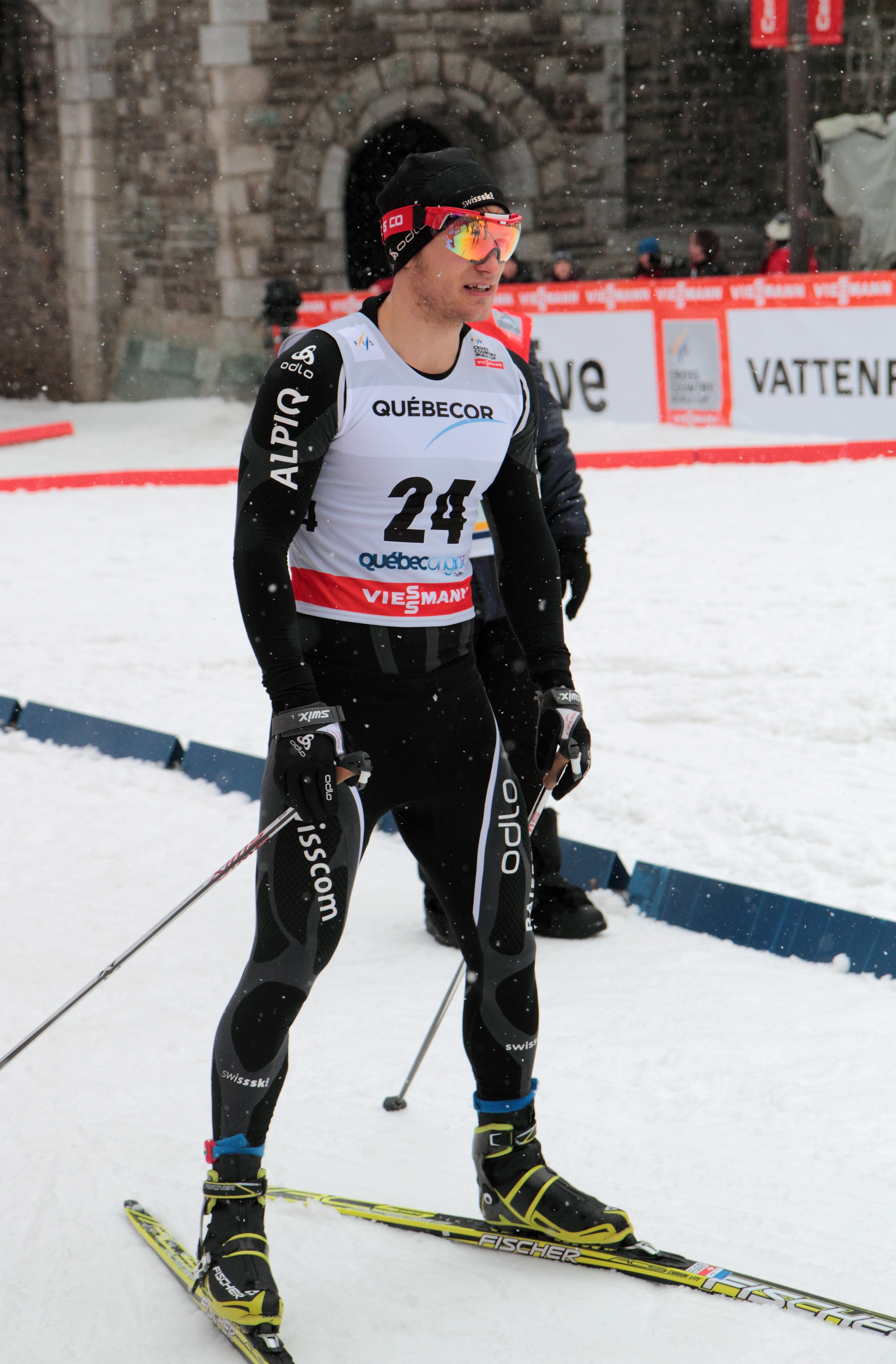
- Kindschi in 2012

Personal information
- Nationality: Switzerland
- Born: 8 October 1986 (age 39) Davos, Switzerland

Sport
- Sport: Skiing
- Club: SAS Bern

World Cup career
- Seasons: 13 – (2007– 2019)
- Indiv. starts: 72
- Indiv. podiums: 0
- Team starts: 15
- Team podiums: 0
- Overall titles: 0 – (65th in 2013)
- Discipline titles: 0
- Updated on 4 December 2021

Jöri Kindschi (born 8 October 1986) is a Swiss cross-country skier.

== Cross-country skiing results ==
All results are sourced from the International Ski Federation (FIS).

=== Olympic Games ===
Year	Age	15 km individual	30 km skiathlon	50 km mass start	Sprint	4 × 10 km relay	Team sprint
2014	27	—	—	—	22	—	—

=== World Championships ===
Year	Age	15 km individual	30 km skiathlon	50 km mass start	Sprint	4 × 10 km relay	Team sprint
2011	24	—	—	—	38	—	16
2013	26	—	—	—	—	—	15

=== World Cup ===
==== Season standings ====
Season	Age	Discipline standings			Ski Tour standings			
Season	Age	Overall	Distance	Sprint	Nordic Opening	Tour de Ski	World Cup Final	Ski Tour Canada
2007	20	NC	—	NC	—N/a	—	—N/a	—N/a
2008	21	NC	NC	NC	—N/a	—	—	—N/a
2009	22	173	—	107	—N/a	—	—	—N/a
2010	23	132	—	70	—N/a	—	—	—N/a
2011	24	103	—	57	—	—	—	—N/a
2012	25	81	—	38	—	—	—	—N/a
2013	26	65	—	29	—	—	—	—N/a
2014	27	74	NC	31	—	DNF	—	—N/a
2015	28	86	—	39	—	DNF	—N/a	—N/a
2016	29	86	—	48	—	DNF	—N/a	—
2017	30	NC	—	NC	—	—	—	—N/a
2018	31	NC	—	NC	—	—	—	—N/a
2019	32	NC	NC	NC	—	—	—	—N/a
