= Øystein Pettersen =

Norwegian cross-country skier

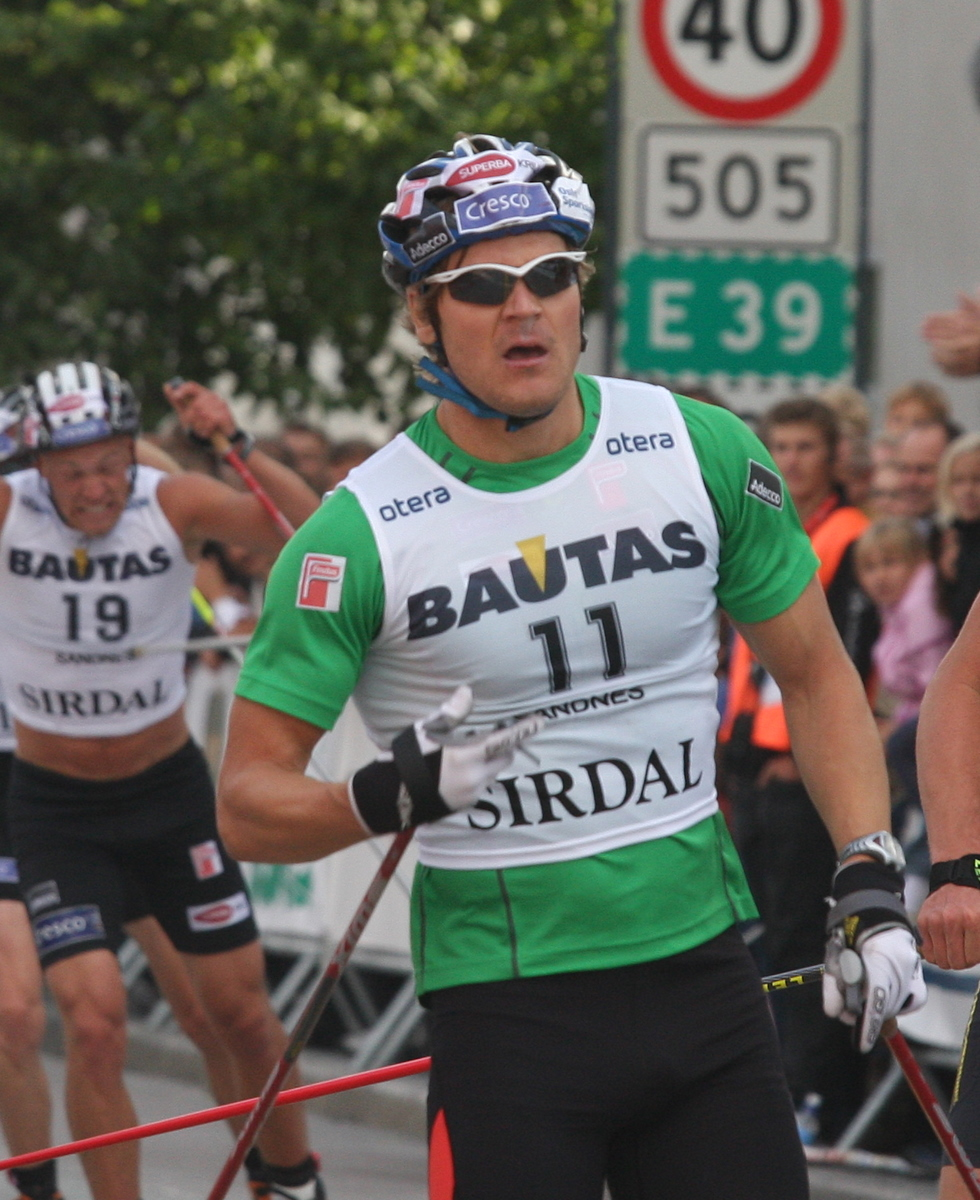

Personal information
- Nationality: (Norway)
- Born: 19 January 1983 (age 43) Linderud, Oslo, Norway
- Height: 1.81 m (5 ft 11 in)

Sport
- Sport: Skiing
- Club: Bækkelagets SK, Oslo; Lillomarka SK, Oslo

World Cup career
- Seasons: 12 – (2003–2014)
- Indiv. starts: 88
- Indiv. podiums: 6
- Indiv. wins: 0
- Team starts: 7
- Team podiums: 3
- Team wins: 1
- Overall titles: 0 – (28th in 2008)
- Discipline titles: 0
Medal record
Men's cross-country skiing
Representing Norway
Olympic Games
Gold medal – first place	2010 Vancouver	Team sprint
Junior World Championships
Silver medal – second place	2003 Sollefteå	4 × 10 km relay

Øystein "Pølsa" Pettersen (born 19 January 1983 in Linderud) is a former Norwegian cross-country skier, television personality and podcast host who competed professionally from 2002 to 2019. He has six World Cup podiums, his best finish being second in individual sprint events. Together with Petter Northug he won gold medal in the team sprint event at the 2010 Winter Olympics in Vancouver, Canada. In the Individual Sprint he was one of three Norwegians to reach the six-man final.

In 2020 he was a contestant in the celebrity edition of the norwegian TV show, 71° Nord and in 2021 he took part in Mesternes Mester.

Pettersen also hosts his own podcast called Skipodden. A comedy style podcast about training and life, with an extra focus on winter sports. Skipodden has had many prominent guests including John Arne Riise, Marit Bjørgen, Gunde Svan and Petter Northug.

== Athletic career ==
Pettersen began competing in national events in 2002 and in junior international events in 2003. Although he has competed in dozens of events, he only finished in the top three at World Cup events five times, including second-place finished in Germany in 2006 and in Estonia in 2009. He did not compete in the 2006 Winter Olympics, but did win a gold medal that year in the Scandinavian championships.

Pettersen was selected to join the Norwegian team at the 2010 Winter Olympics in Vancouver, Canada. In his first Olympic event, the individual sprint, he placed sixth, one of three Norwegians who made it to the final competition round. He later won a gold medal with teammate Petter Northug in the team sprint event in a close finish with teams from Germany and Russia. Originally, Pettersen was not going to compete in the event, but a last-minute withdrawal by world champion Ola Vigen Hattestad due to illness left a slot open, and Pettersen was chosen to fill it. A number of teams were in contention following Pettersen's performance during the first leg of the race, and it was not until the last hill that Northug passed his opponents and took the lead entering the stadium where the race finished.

== Cross-country skiing results ==
All results are sourced from the International Ski Federation (FIS).

=== Olympic Games ===
- 1 medal – (1 gold)

Year	Age	15 km individual	30 km skiathlon	50 km mass start	Sprint	4 × 10 km relay	Team sprint
2010	27	—	—	—	6	—	Gold

=== World Championships ===
Year	Age	15 km individual	30 km skiathlon	50 km mass start	Sprint	4 × 10 km relay	Team sprint
2011	28	—	—	—	41	—	—

=== World Cup ===
==== Season standings ====
Season	Age	Discipline standings			Ski Tour standings		
Season	Age	Overall	Distance	Sprint	Nordic Opening	Tour de Ski	World Cup Final
2003	20	119	—N/a	62	—N/a	—N/a	—N/a
2004	21	141	NC	63	—N/a	—N/a	—N/a
2005	22	NC	NC	NC	—N/a	—N/a	—N/a
2006	23	68	NC	26	—N/a	—N/a	—N/a
2007	24	28	54	12	—N/a	53	—N/a
2008	25	40	NC	13	—N/a	—	—
2009	26	44	NC	13	—N/a	—	DNF
2010	27	34	88	14	—N/a	—	18
2011	28	57	NC	20	32	—	—
2012	29	53	NC	19	DNF	—	—
2013	30	73	NC	33	—	—	—
2014	31	111	94	66	32	—	—

==== Individual podiums ====
- 6 podiums – (5 WC, 1 SWC)

No.	Season	Date	Location	Race	Level	Place
1	2006–07	28 October 2006	Düsseldorf, Germany	1.5 km Sprint F	World Cup	2nd
2	2007–08	16 December 2007	Rybinsk, Russia	1.2 km Sprint F	World Cup	3rd
3	2008–09	25 January 2009	Otepää, Estonia	1.4 km Sprint C	World Cup	2nd
4	2009–10	28 November 2009	Rukatunturi, Finland	1.4 km Sprint C	World Cup	2nd
5	2010–11	4 December 2010	Düsseldorf, Germany	1.7 km Sprint F	World Cup	3rd
6	2011–12	25 November 2011	Rukatunturi, Finland	1.4 km Sprint C	Stage World Cup	3rd

==== Team podiums ====
- 1 victory – (1 RL)
- 3 podiums – (1 RL, 2 TS)

No.	Season	Date	Location	Race	Level	Place	Teammate(s)
1	2006–07	29 October 2006	Düsseldorf, Germany	6 × 1.5 km Team Sprint F	World Cup	2nd	Rønning
2	2006–07	25 March 2007	Falun, Sweden	4 × 10 km Relay C/F	World Cup	1st	Hjelmeset / Estil / Northug
3	2013–14	22 December 2013	Asiago, Italy	6 × 1.65 km Team Sprint C	World Cup	3rd	Brandsdal
