= Irina Terentjeva =

Lithuanian cross-country skier (born 1984)

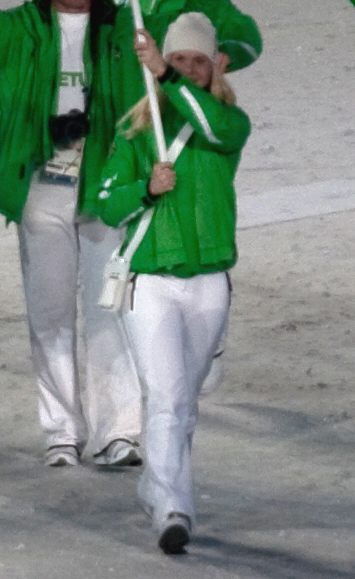
Irina Terentjeva (2010)

Irina Terentjeva (born 30 June 1984) is a Lithuanian former cross-country skier who has competed since 2000. She competed in three Winter Olympics: Salt Lake City 2002, Turin 2006 and Vancouver 2010, she earned her best finish of 37th in the individual sprint event at Turin in 2006.

== Career ==
Irina Terentjeva won a silver medal in individual 10 km F event in the 2001 European Youth Championships (EYOF 2001) in Vuokatti, Finland. She won a bronze medal in the individual 5 km F event at the 2002 Junior World Championships in Schonach, Germany.

Terentjeva's best finish at the FIS U23 World Ski Championships was a 7th place in the individual 10 km F event in Tarvisio 2007.

Terentjeva's best finish at the FIS Nordic World Ski Championships was 27th in the individual sprint event at Val di Fiemme in 2003. Terentjeva's best finish at the individual 10 km F event was 30th at the 2007 World Ski Championships in Sapporo.

Her best World Cup finish was 25th at a 10 km event in Finland in 2005. Terentjeva's best position at the individual event 15 km F at the Winter Universiade was a 4th place in Pragelato 2007.

Irina Terentjeva moved to Finland in 2010 and finished her skiing career in 2012.
