= Karolis Zlatkauskas =

Lithuanian biathlete (born 1985)

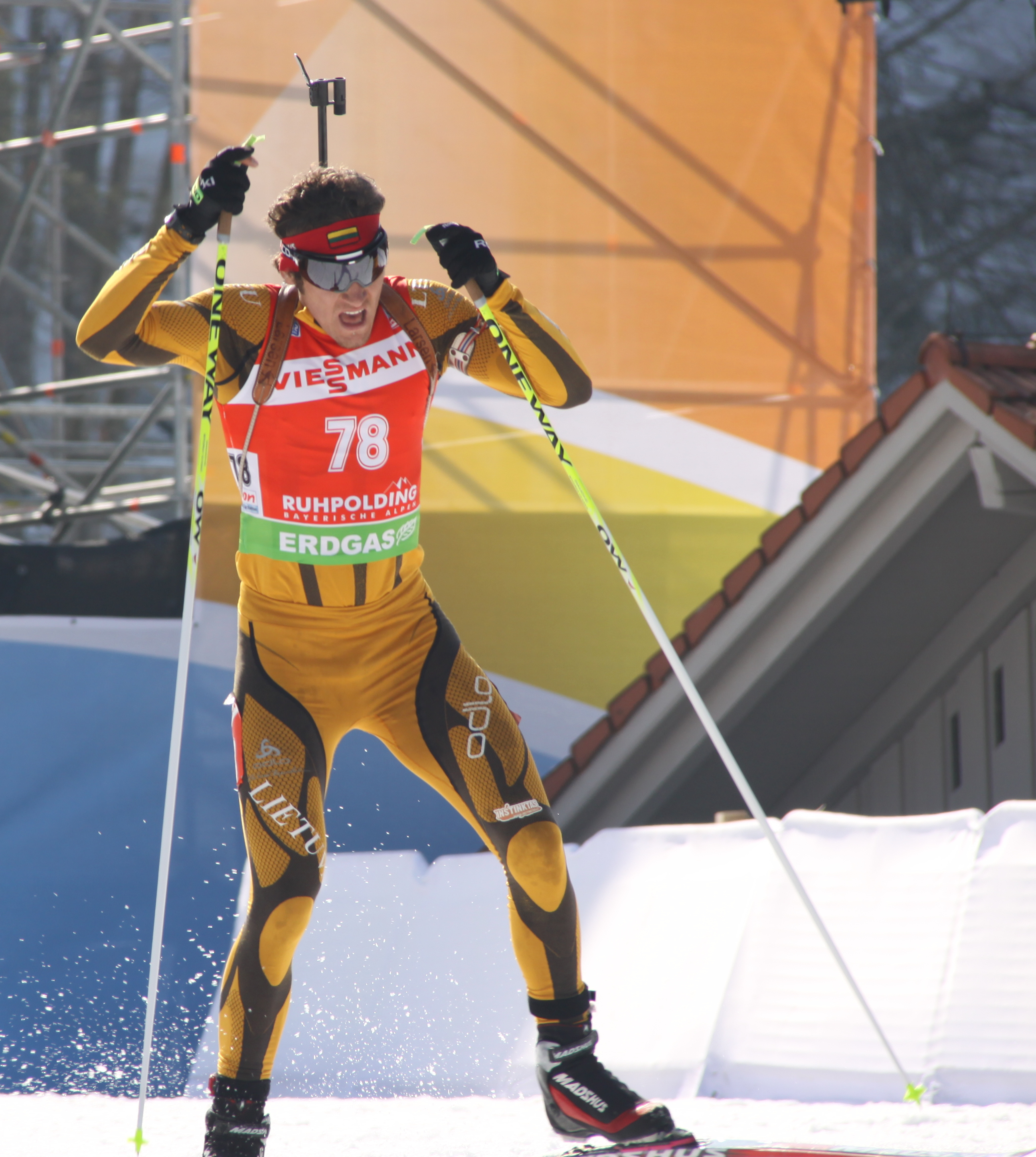

Personal information
- Nationality: Lithuanian
- Born: 19 February 1985 (age 40) Vilnius, Lithuanian SSR, Soviet Union

Sport
- Sport: Biathlon
- Club: SK Vilimeksas

Karolis Zlatkauskas (born 19 February 1985) is a Lithuanian biathlete. He competed in the men's sprint event at the 2006 Winter Olympics.

In February 2014, Zlatkauskas admitted to doping after a test performed in December 2013 revealed traces of erythropoietin.
