= Cyril Gaillard =

French cross-country skier

Personal information
- Born: 20 January 1986 (age 39); Grenoble, France
- Height: 1.78 m (5 ft 10 in)
- Weight: 72 kg (159 lb)

Sport
- Country: France
- Sport: Cross-country skiing
- Coached by: Christophe Deloche

Cyril Gaillard (born 20 January 1986 in Grenoble) is a French cross-country skier. He competed for France at the 2014 Winter Olympics.
