= Nikita Kryukov =

Russian cross-country skier

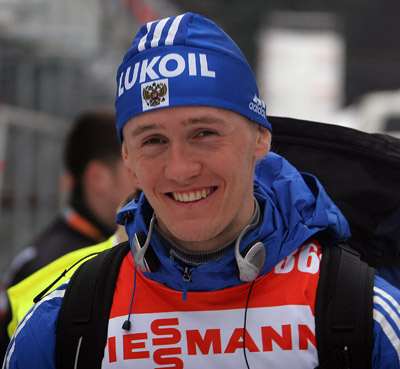
- Nikita Kryukov at the 2009 World Championships in Liberec

Personal information
- Full name: Nikita Valeryevich Kryukov
- Nationality: Russia
- Born: 30 May 1985 (age 41) Dzerzhinsky, Moscow Oblast, Russian SFSR, Soviet Union

Sport
- Sport: Skiing
- Club: Sdusor 81

World Cup career
- Seasons: 12 – (2007–2018)
- Indiv. starts: 92
- Indiv. podiums: 14
- Indiv. wins: 5
- Team starts: 14
- Team podiums: 5
- Team wins: 1
- Overall titles: 0 – (21st in 2010)
- Discipline titles: 0
Medal record
Men's cross-country skiing
Representing Russia
International nordic ski competitions
Event	1st	2nd	3rd
Olympic Games	1	1	0
World Championships	3	1	1
Total	4	2	1
Olympic Games
Gold medal – first place	2010 Vancouver	Individual sprint
Silver medal – second place	2014 Sochi	Team sprint
World Championships
Gold medal – first place	2013 Val di Fiemme	Individual sprint
Gold medal – first place	2013 Val di Fiemme	Team sprint
Gold medal – first place	2017 Lahti	Team sprint
Silver medal – second place	2015 Falun	Team sprint
Bronze medal – third place	2011 Oslo	Team sprint

Nikita Valeryevich Kryukov (Russian: Никита Валерьевич Крюков; born 30 May 1985) is a Russian former cross-country skier who competed internationally between 2006 and 2018. He was a sprint specialist who won an Olympic gold medal, three World Championship gold medals, six World cup gold medals (three stage races, three individual World Cups), all in the sprint events. He was arguably the fastest skier ever when it came to double-poling on the flat in sprints. He generally favoured classic skiing and classic sprints over freestyle, but as he showed in winning the team sprint in the 2013 World Championship, in Val di Fiemme, he was also very strong in the freestyle sprint.

== Career ==
The highlights of his career were at the 2010 Vancouver Olympics where he beat his teammate from behind with a late closing sprint, in a photo finish that took minutes to determine. At the 2013 World Championships, where he won gold medals in both the individual classic sprint and the team freestyle sprint. A late fall by another team that impeded his closing 200 metres likely cost him a second Olympic Gold in the team sprint in Sochi where he took silver.

In November 2017, Maxim Vylegzhanin was disqualified for doping offenses, as a result Kryukov lost its silver medal in the Team sprint awarded at the 2014 Winter Olympics. On 22 December 2017 Kriukov as well was found to have committed violations against the anti-doping rule at the 2014 Olympics. He was ordered to return his Olympic silver medal and barred from all future Olympic games. In January 2018, he successfully appealed against the lifetime ban as well as decision to strip his medal from Sochi Olympics at the court of arbitration for sport.

Kryukov announced his retirement from cross-country skiing on 8 April 2019.

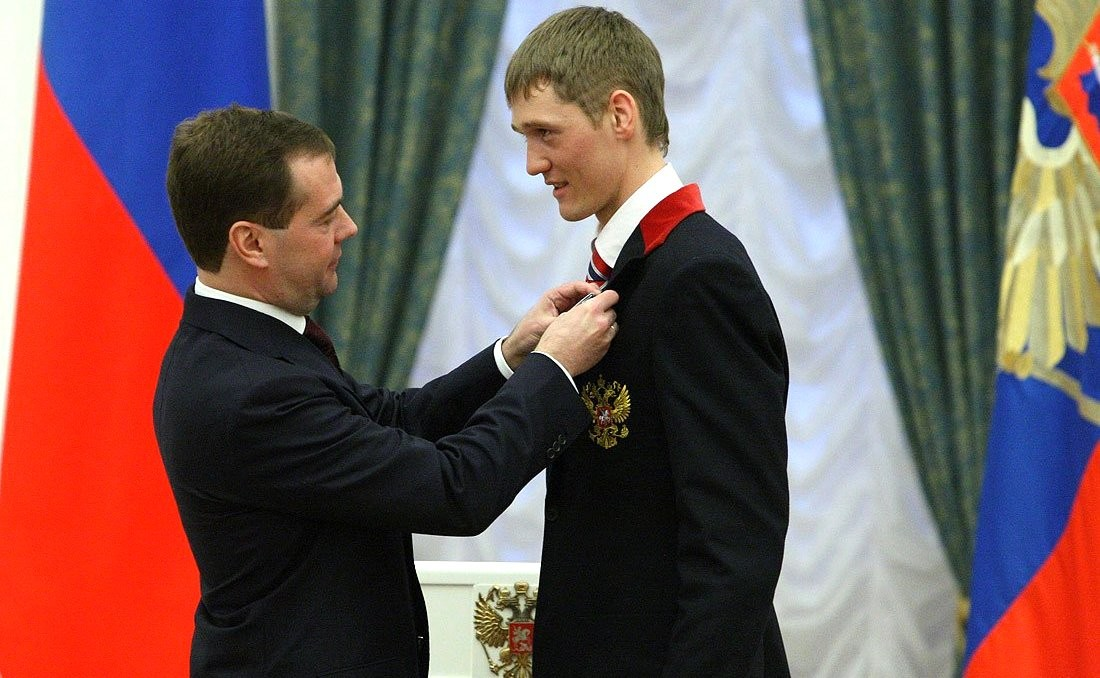
With Dmitry Medvedev on presentation of the Order of Friendship, 15 March 2010

== Cross-country skiing results ==
All results are sourced from the International Ski Federation (FIS).

=== Olympic Games ===
- 2 medals – (1 gold, 1 silver)

Year	Age	15 km individual	30 km skiathlon	50 km mass start	Sprint	4 × 10 km relay	Team sprint
2010	24	—	—	—	Gold	—	—
2014	28	—	—	—	13	—	Silver

=== World Championships ===
- 5 medals – (3 gold, 1 silver, 1 bronze)

Year	Age	15 km individual	30 km skiathlon	50 km mass start	Sprint	4 × 10 km relay	Team sprint
2009	23	—	—	—	—	—	4
2011	25	—	—	—	—	—	Bronze
2013	27	—	—	—	Gold	—	Gold
2015	29	—	—	—	4	—	Silver
2017	31	—	—	—	—	—	Gold

=== World Cup ===
==== Season standings ====
Season	Age	Discipline standings			Ski Tour standings			
Season	Age	Overall	Distance	Sprint	Nordic Opening	Tour de Ski	World Cup Final	Ski Tour Canada
2007	21	132	NC	64	—N/a	—	—N/a	—N/a
2008	22	56	—	22	—N/a	—	—	—N/a
2009	23	35	NC	10	—N/a	—	68	—N/a
2010	24	21	—	6	—N/a	—	DNF	—N/a
2011	25	55	—	19	DNF	—	—	—N/a
2012	26	34	70	10	DNF	DNF	DNF	—N/a
2013	27	25	—	3rd place, bronze medalist(s)	DNF	—	DNF	—N/a
2014	28	25	—	5	DNF	—	DNF	—N/a
2015	29	42	—	12	—	—	—N/a	—N/a
2016	30	49	NC	19	DNF	—	—N/a	—
2017	31	83	—	36	—	—	—	—N/a
2018	32	NC	—	NC	—	—	—	—N/a

==== Individual podiums ====
- 5 victories – (1 WC, 4 SWC)
- 14 podiums – (8 WC, 6 SWC)

No.	Season	Date	Location	Race	Level	Place
1	2009–10	28 November 2009	Rukatunturi, Finland	1.4 km Sprint C	World Cup	3rd
2	2009–10	17 January 2010	Otepää, Estonia	1.4 km Sprint C	World Cup	3rd
3	2009–10	22 January 2010	Rybinsk, Russia	1.3 km Sprint F	World Cup	3rd
4	2009–10	17 March 2010	Stockholm, Sweden	1.0 km Sprint C	Stage World Cup	1st
5	2010–11	23 January 2011	Otepää, Estonia	1.4 km Sprint C	World Cup	3rd
6	2011–12	25 November 2011	Rukatunturi, Finland	1.4 km Sprint C	World Cup	2nd
7	2011–12	31 December 2011	Oberstdorf, Germany	1.2 km Sprint C	Stage World Cup	1st
8	2011–12	4 March 2012	Lahti, Finland	1.3 km Sprint C	World Cup	3rd
9	2012–13	30 November 2012	Rukatunturi, Finland	1.4 km Sprint C	Stage World Cup	1st
10	2012–13	15 December 2012	Canmore, Canada	1.3 km Sprint F	World Cup	3rd
11	2012–13	13 March 2013	Drammen, Norway	1.3 km Sprint C	World Cup	3rd
12	2012–13	20 March 2013	Stockholm, Sweden	1.1 km Sprint C	Stage World Cup	3rd
13	2013–14	21 December 2013	Asiago, Italy	1.65 km Sprint C	Stage World Cup	1st
14	2015–16	11 February 2016	Stockholm, Sweden	1.2 km Sprint C	Stage World Cup	1st

==== Team podiums ====
- 1 victory – (1 TS)
- 5 podiums – (5 TS)

No.	Season	Date	Location	Race	Level	Place	Teammate
1	2011–12	4 December 2011	Düsseldorf, Germany	6 × 1.7 km Team Sprint F	World Cup	2nd	Petukhov
2	2013–13	4 December 2011	Quebec City, Canada	6 × 1.6 km Team Sprint F	World Cup	2nd	Petukhov
3	2013–13	13 January 2013	Liberec, Czech Republic	6 × 1.6 km Team Sprint F	World Cup	3rd	Petukhov
4	2013–14	14 January 2014	Nové Město, Czech Republic	6 × 1.6 km Team Sprint C	World Cup	1st	Vylegzhanin
5	2016–17	5 January 2017	Pyeongchang, South Korea	6 × 1.5 km Team Sprint F	World Cup	3rd	Maltsev
