= Timo Simonlatser =

Estonian cross-country skier (born 1986)

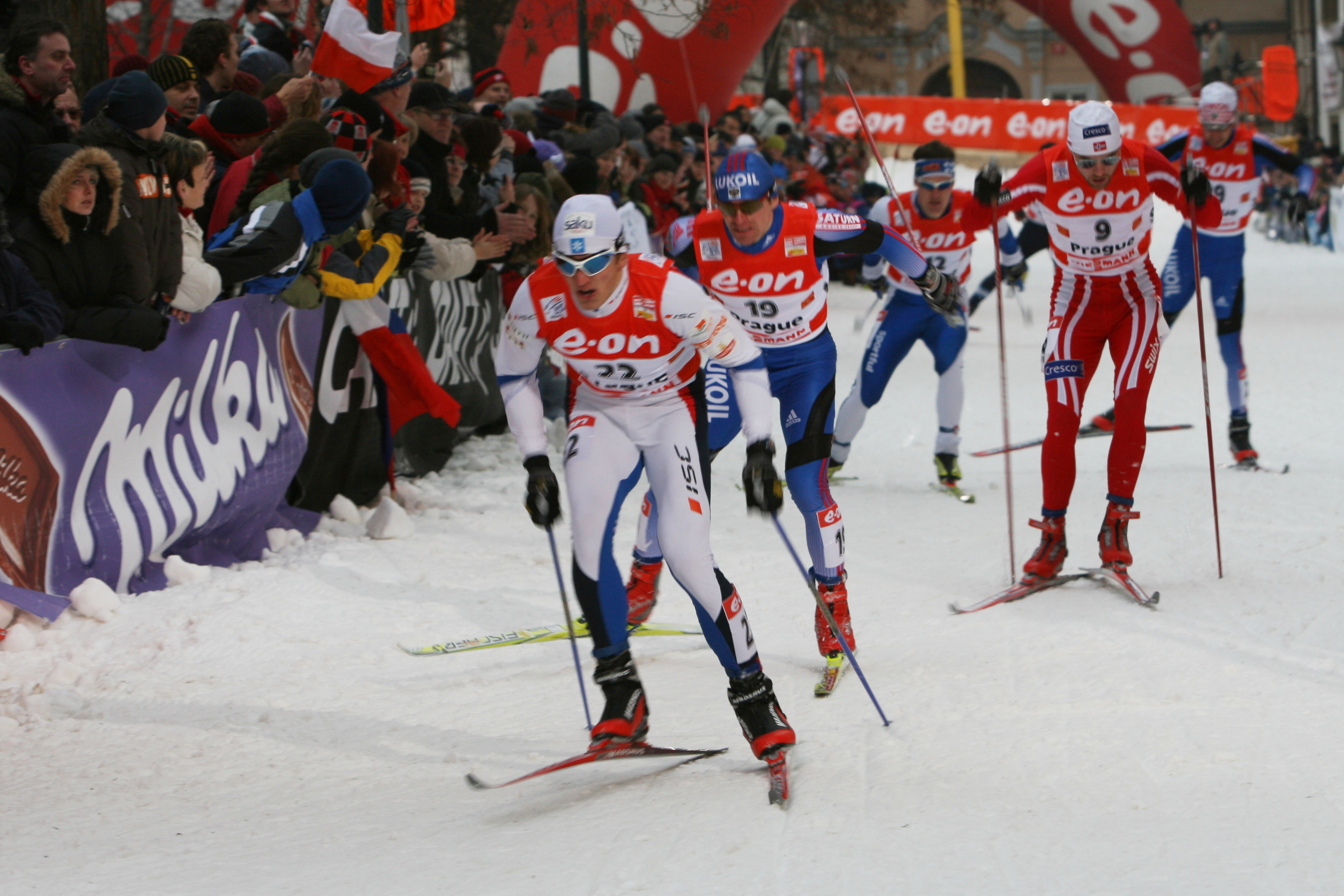
- Simonlatser at Tour de Ski, Prague 2007
- Born: 17 May 1986 (age 38); Rakvere, Lääne-Virumaa, Estonia
- Height: 175 cm (5 ft 9 in)
- Sports career
- Sport: Cross-country skiing
- Club: Tamsalu AO Suusaklubi

Timo Simonlatser (born 17 May 1986) is an Estonian cross-country skier who has competed since 2005. He finished 27th in the individual sprint at the 2010 Winter Olympics in Vancouver.

Simonlatser's best finish at the FIS Nordic World Ski Championships was 24th in the individual sprint event at Sapporo in 2007.

His best World Cup finish was seventh in a team sprint event at Russia in January 2010 while his best individual finish was 12th three times since 2008.
