= Petr Novák (skier) =

Czech cross-country skier (born 1982)

Personal information
- Nationality: Czech
- Born: 18 June 1982 (age 42); Karlovy Vary

Sport
- Country: Czech Republic
- Sport: Cross-country skiing

Petr Novák (born 18 June 1982) is a Czech cross-country skier. He competed at the FIS Nordic World Ski Championships 2011 in Oslo, and at the 2014 Winter Olympics in Sochi.
