= Jesse Väänänen =

Finnish cross-country skier

Personal information
- Nationality: Finland
- Born: 6 January 1984 (age 42) Lahti, Finland

Sport
- Sport: Skiing
- Club: Lahden Hiihtoseura

World Cup career
- Seasons: 8 – (2004–2005, 2007–2012)
- Indiv. starts: 29
- Indiv. podiums: 0
- Team starts: 3
- Team podiums: 0
- Overall titles: 0 – (73rd in 2008)
- Discipline titles: 0

Jesse Väänänen (born 6 January 1984 in Lahti) is a Finnish cross-country skier who has competed since 2003. He finished 22nd in the individual sprint event at the 2010 Winter Olympics in Vancouver.

Väänänen's best World Cup finish was fourth in a sprint event in Estonia in January 2010.

== Cross-country skiing results ==
All results are sourced from the International Ski Federation (FIS).

=== Olympic Games ===
Year	Age	15 km individual	30 km skiathlon	50 km mass start	Sprint	4 × 10 km relay	Team sprint
2010	21	—	—	—	22	—	—

=== World Cup ===
==== Season standings ====
Season	Age	Discipline standings			Ski Tour standings		
Season	Age	Overall	Distance	Sprint	Nordic Opening	Tour de Ski	World Cup Final
2004	20	NC	—	NC	—N/a	—N/a	—N/a
2005	21	NC	—	NC	—N/a	—N/a	—N/a
2007	23	NC	NC	NC	—N/a	—	—N/a
2008	24	73	NC	43	—N/a	—	—
2009	25	101	111	57	—N/a	—	—
2010	26	92	—	43	—N/a	—	—
2011	27	126	—	75	—	—	—
2012	28	NC	—	NC	—	—	—
