= Aleksei Novoselski =

Lithuanian cross country skier (born 1985)

Aleksei Novoselski (born February 2, 1985) is a Lithuanian cross-country skier who has competed since 2002. Competing in two Winter Olympics, he earned his best finish of 53rd in the individual sprint event at Vancouver in 2010.

Novoselski's best finish at the FIS Nordic World Ski Championships was 21st in the team sprint at Liberec in 2009.

His best World Cup finish was 29th in the team sprint at the Czech Republic in 2008.
