= Kein Einaste =

Estonian cross-country skier (born 1985)

Kein Einaste (born February 22, 1985, in Pärnu) is an Estonian cross-country skier who has competed since 2004. His best World Cup finish was 7th in a sprint event in Otepää in January 2010. At the 2010 Winter Olympics in Vancouver, he finished 59th (after a crash in a prologue) in the men's sprint.

2018–2022 he worked as a Swiss men's cross-country skiing team's head coach and from 2022 works as the head coach of Swiss biathlon team.
