= Mantas Strolia =

Lithuanian cross-country skier (born 1986)

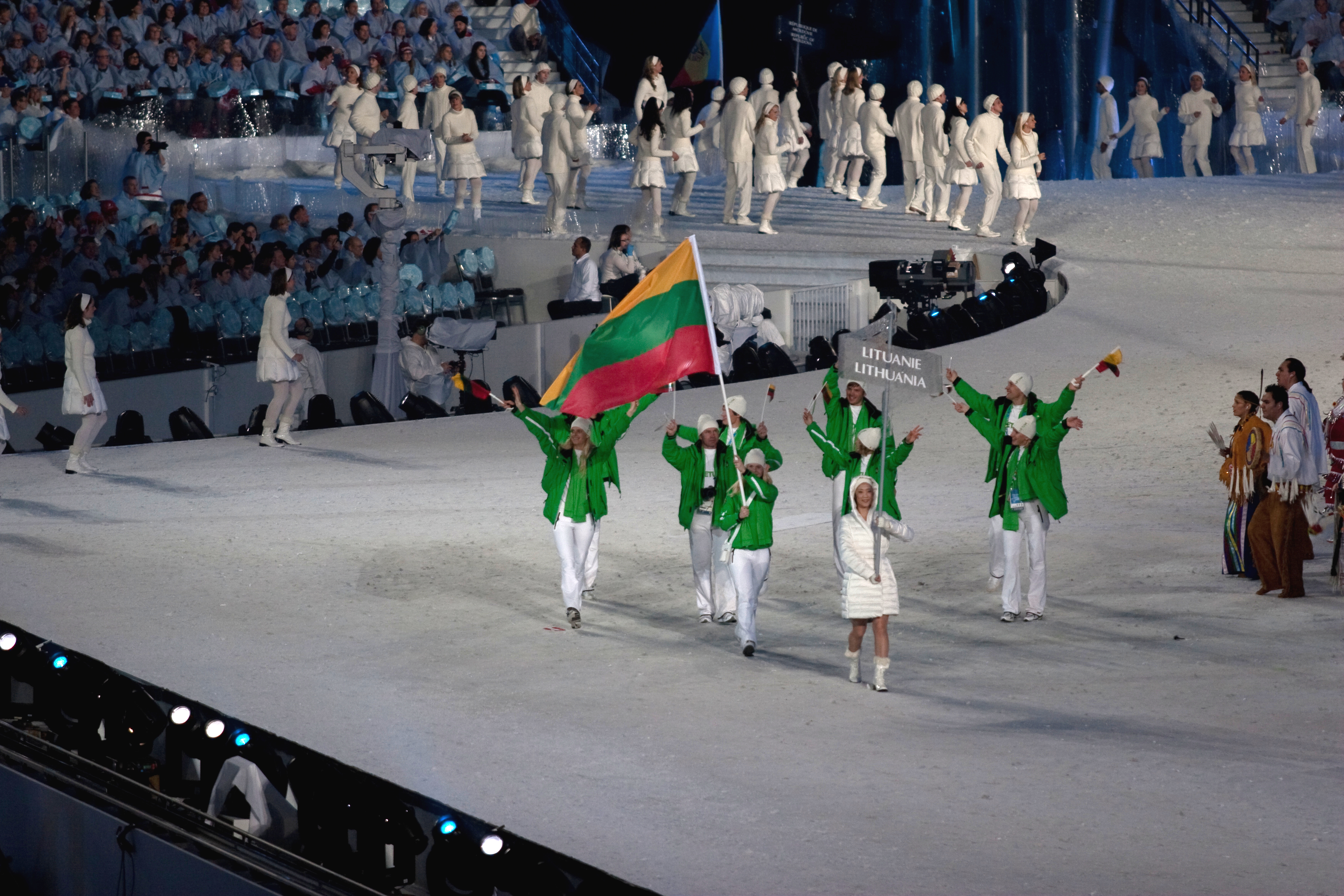

Personal information
- Born: February 28, 1986 (age 40) Ignalina, Lithuanian SSR, Soviet Union
- Height: 1.79 m (5 ft 10 in)

Sport
- Sport: Skiing

Mantas Strolia (born February 28, 1986) is a Lithuanian cross-country skier since 2005. At the 2010 Winter Olympics in Vancouver, he finished 18th in the team sprint and 46th in the individual sprint events.

At the FIS Nordic World Ski Championships 2009 in Liberec, Strolia finished 21st in the team sprint, 60th in the sprint, and 73rd in the 15 km event.

His best World Cup finish was 33rd in a sprint event in Canada in February 2010. Lives in London Great Britain since 2010, founder of CitySkier.
