= Cross-country skiing at the 2010 Winter Olympics =

Cross-country skiing at the XXI Olympic Winter Games
- Venue: Whistler Olympic Park
- Dates: 15–28 February 2010
- No. of events: 12
- Competitors: 292 from 55 nations

The cross-country skiing competition of the 2010 Winter Olympics in Vancouver were held at Whistler Olympic Park. The events were held between 15 and 28 February 2010.

== Medals summary ==
=== Medal table ===
| Rank | Nation | Gold | Silver | Bronze | Total |
|---|---|---|---|---|---|
| 1 | Norway | 5 | 2 | 2 | 9 |
| 2 | Sweden | 3 | 2 | 2 | 7 |
| 3 | Germany | 1 | 4 | 0 | 5 |
| 4 | Russia | 1 | 1 | 2 | 4 |
| 5 | Poland | 1 | 1 | 1 | 3 |
| 6 | Switzerland | 1 | 0 | 0 | 1 |
| 7 | Estonia | 0 | 1 | 0 | 1 |
| 7 | Italy | 0 | 1 | 0 | 1 |
| 9 | Czech Republic | 0 | 0 | 2 | 2 |
| 9 | Finland | 0 | 0 | 2 | 2 |
| 11 | Slovenia | 0 | 0 | 1 | 1 |
| Totals (11 entries) | | 12 | 12 | 12 | 36 |

=== Men's events ===
| Event | Gold | | Silver | | Bronze | |
|---|---|---|---|---|---|---|
| 15 km freestyle | Dario Cologna; Switzerland | 33:36.3 | Pietro Piller Cottrer; Italy | 34:00.9 | Lukáš Bauer; Czech Republic | 34:12.0 |
| 30 km pursuit | Marcus Hellner; Sweden | 1:15:11.4 | Tobias Angerer; Germany | 1:15:13.5 | Johan Olsson; Sweden | 1:15:14.2 |
| 50 km classical | Petter Northug; Norway | 2:05:35.5 | Axel Teichmann; Germany | 2:05:35.8 | Johan Olsson; Sweden | 2:05:36.5 |
| 4 × 10 km relay | Sweden; Daniel Rickardsson; Johan Olsson; Anders Södergren; Marcus Hellner | 1:45:05.4 | Norway; Martin Johnsrud Sundby; Odd-Bjørn Hjelmeset; Lars Berger; Petter Northug | 1:45:21.3 | Czech Republic; Martin Jakš; Lukáš Bauer; Jiří Magál; Martin Koukal | 1:45:21.9 |
| Sprint | Nikita Kryukov; Russia | 3:36.3 | Alexander Panzhinskiy; Russia | 3:36.3 | Petter Northug; Norway | 3:45.5 |
| Team sprint | Norway; Øystein Pettersen; Petter Northug | 19:01.0 | Germany; Tim Tscharnke; Axel Teichmann | 19:02.3 | Russia; Nikolay Morilov; Alexey Petukhov | 19:02.5 |

=== Women's events ===
| Event | Gold | | Silver | | Bronze | |
|---|---|---|---|---|---|---|
| 10 km freestyle | Charlotte Kalla; Sweden | 24:58.4 | Kristina Šmigun-Vähi; Estonia | 25:05.0 | Marit Bjørgen; Norway | 25:14.3 |
| 15 km pursuit | Marit Bjørgen; Norway | 39:58.1 | Anna Haag; Sweden | 40:07.0 | Justyna Kowalczyk; Poland | 40:07.4 |
| 30 km classical | Justyna Kowalczyk; Poland | 1:30:33.7 | Marit Bjørgen; Norway | 1:30:34.0 | Aino-Kaisa Saarinen; Finland | 1:31:38.7 |
| 4 × 5 km relay | Norway; Vibeke Skofterud; Therese Johaug; Kristin Størmer Steira; Marit Bjørgen | 55:19.5 | Germany; Katrin Zeller; Evi Sachenbacher-Stehle; Miriam Gössner; Claudia Nystad | 55:44.1 | Finland; Pirjo Muranen; Virpi Kuitunen; Riitta-Liisa Roponen; Aino-Kaisa Saarinen | 55:49.9 |
| Sprint | Marit Bjørgen; Norway | 3:39.2 | Justyna Kowalczyk; Poland | 3:40.3 | Petra Majdič; Slovenia | 3:41.0 |
| Team sprint | Germany; Evi Sachenbacher-Stehle; Claudia Nystad | 18:03.7 | Sweden; Charlotte Kalla; Anna Haag | 18:04.3 | Russia; Irina Khazova; Natalya Korostelyova | 18:07.7 |

== Competition schedule ==
All times are Pacific Standard Time (UTC-8).

| Day | Date | Start | Finish | Event |
|---|---|---|---|---|
| Day 4 | Monday 15 February | 10:00 | 11:15 | 10 km individual free women |
| Day 4 | Monday 15 February | 12:30 | 14:00 | 15 km individual free men |
| Day 6 | Wednesday 17 February | 10:15 | 11:00 | Individual sprint classic men/women |
| Day 6 | Wednesday 17 February | 12:30 | 14:00 | Individual sprint classic men/women |
| Day 8 | Friday 19 February | 13:00 | 13:50 | 15 km pursuit women |
| Day 9 | Saturday 20 February | 13:30 | 15:00 | 30 km pursuit men |
| Day 11 | Monday 22 February | 10:45 | 12:15 | Team sprint free men/women |
| Day 11 | Monday 22 February | 13:00 | 13:45 | Team sprint free men/women |
| Day 13 | Wednesday 24 February | 11:15 | 13:10 | 4 x 10 km relay men |
| Day 14 | Thursday 25 February | 11:00 | 12:05 | 4 x 5 km relay women |
| Day 16 | Saturday 27 February | 11:45 | 13:45 | 30 km mass start classic women |
| Day 17 | Sunday 28 February | 9:30 | 12:15 | 50 km mass start classic men |

== Qualification ==
Across the twelve cross-country skiing events, a maximum of 310 athletes are allowed to compete. No nation can have more than 20 skiers competing, with an additional limit of 12 men or 12 women per specific nation. For each event, a nation can enter four skiers in individual events and one team in relay races.

"A" Competitors with less than 100 distance FIS points will be allowed to compete in any event. Competitors with less than 120 sprint FIS points will be allowed to compete in sprint events only.

"B" Countries that do not have a skier that meets the "A" Qualification standard have the right to enter one male and one female skier in either the sprint or the 10 km (women)/ 15 km (men) on condition that the skiers competed at the FIS Nordic World Ski Championships 2009 and have a maximum of 300 FIS points in the event concerned.

A basic quota of one man and one woman was assigned to all nations competing. Each nation with a skier in the top 300 of the distance or sprint FIS points lists was allocated one additional quota place. For top 30 in the 2009-10 Cross-Country Skiing World Cup extra quota places were allocated separately for both genders, nations with two or more skiers in the top 30 earning two more skiers and nations with one skier in the top 30 earning one extra place. The remaining quotas were allocated to countries based on the FIS point allocation list. Once a nation reached the maximum of 20 slots it became ineligible to earn any more slots. Quota places not used up by the National Olympic Committees were returned to the pool and reallocated. This process started on 18 January 2006 and ran until 28 January 2010.

== Participating nations ==
55 countries participated in the 2010 edition.

- Algeria (1 athlete)
- Andorra (1)
- Argentina (1)
- Armenia (2)
- Australia (3)
- Austria (1)
- Belarus (7)
- Bermuda (1)
- Bosnia and Herzegovina (2)
- Brazil (2)
- Bulgaria (3)
- Canada (13)
- China (5)
- Croatia (2)
- Czech Republic (11)
- Denmark (1)
- Estonia (14)
- Ethiopia (1)
- Finland (17)
- France (13)
- Germany (14)
- Great Britain (3)
- Greece (2)
- Hungary (2)
- India (1)
- Iran (1)
- Ireland (1)
- Italy (18)
- Japan (6)
- Kazakhstan (11)
- Kyrgyzstan (1)
- Latvia (2)
- Lithuania (4)
- Macedonia (2)
- Moldova (2)
- Mongolia (2)
- Nepal (1)
- New Zealand (2)
- Norway (19)
- Peru (1)
- Poland (6)
- Portugal (1)
- Romania (3)
- Russia (19)
- Serbia (2)
- Slovakia (5)
- Slovenia (5)
- South Africa (1)
- South Korea (2)
- Spain (4)
- Sweden (15)
- Switzerland (12)
- Turkey (2)
- Ukraine (8)
- United States (11)

== See also ==
- Cross-country skiing at the 2010 Winter Paralympics
