= IBSF World Championships 2025 – Four-man =

Four-man at the IBSF World Championships 2025
- Venue: Mt. Van Hoevenberg Olympic Bobsled Run
- Location: Lake Placid, United States
- Dates: 14–15 March
- Competitors: 96 from 14 nations
- Teams: 24
- Winning time: 2:44.52

Medalists
gold medal	Francesco Friedrich; Matthias Sommer; Alexander Schüller; Felix Straub	Germany
silver medal	Johannes Lochner; Florian Bauer; Jörn Wenzel; Georg Fleischhauer	Germany
bronze medal	Brad Hall; Arran Gulliver; Taylor Lawrence; Greg Cackett	Great Britain

The Four-man competition at the IBSF World Championships 2025 was held on 14 and 15 March 2025.

== Results ==
The first run was started on 14 March at 13:00. The second run was cancelled after a curve was missing ice. The last two runs were started on 15 March at 08:00.

Rank	Bib	Country	Athletes	Run 1	Rank	Run 2	Rank	Run 3	Rank	Run 4	Rank	Total	Behind
1st place, gold medalist(s)	1	Germany	Francesco Friedrich; Matthias Sommer; Alexander Schüller; Felix Straub	54.23	1	—		54.78	1	55.51	3	2:44.52	
2nd place, silver medalist(s)	2	Germany	Johannes Lochner; Florian Bauer; Jörn Wenzel; Georg Fleischhauer	54.52	2	—		55.03	2	55.25	1	2:44.80	+0.28
3rd place, bronze medalist(s)	3	Great Britain	Brad Hall; Arran Gulliver; Taylor Lawrence; Greg Cackett	54.54	3	—		55.03	2	55.43	2	2:45.00	+0.48
4	11	United States	Frank del Duca; Joshua Williamson; Boone Niederhofer; Charles Volker	54.93	5	—		55.16	5	55.55	4	2:45.64	+1.12
5	4	Germany	Adam Ammour; Nick Stadelmann; Issam Ammour; Rupert Schenk	54.87	4	—		55.11	4	55.72	7	2:45.70	+1.18
6	7	Switzerland	Michael Vogt; Gregory Jones; Dominik Hufschmid; Amadou Ndiaye	55.12	8	—		55.43	7	55.71	5	2:46.26	+1.74
7	22	United States	Kristopher Horn; Carsten Vissering; Martin Christofferson; Hunter Powell	55.08	6	—		55.34	6	55.97	9	2:46.39	+1.87
8	16	Canada	Taylor Austin; Mike Evelyn; Keaton Bruggeling; Shaquille Murray-Lawrence	55.29	12	—		55.64	9	55.71	5	2:46.64	+2.12
9	10	South Korea	Kim Jin-su; Kim Sun-wook; Kim Hyeong-geun; Lee Geon-u	55.08	6	—		55.67	11	55.96	8	2:46.71	+2.19
10	8	Switzerland	Timo Rohner; Dominik Schläpfer; Tim Annen; Mathieu Hersperger	55.27	11	—		55.53	8	56.15	11	2:46.95	+2.43
11	5	Italy	Patrick Baumgartner; Eric Fantazzini; Robert Mircea; Lorenzo Bilotti	55.19	9	—		55.66	10	56.30	15	2:47.15	+2.63
12	15	China	Sun Kaizhi; Ding Song; Ye Jielong; Zhen Heng	55.29	12	—		55.69	12	56.19	13	2:47.17	+2.65
13	21	Brazil	Edson Bindilatti; Edson Martins; Rafael Souza da Silva; Erick Gilson	55.38	15	—		55.80	13	56.14	10	2:47.32	+2.80
14	6	Switzerland	Cédric Follador; Nicola Mariani; Omar Vögele; Quentin Juillard	55.29	12	—		55.94	16	56.36	17	2:47.59	+3.07
15	12	Canada	Pat Norton; Mark Zanette; Yohan Eskrick-Parkinson; Chris Ashley	55.51	16	—		55.93	15	56.28	14	2:47.72	+3.20
15	9	Latvia	Jēkabs Kalenda; Arnis Bebrišs; Matīss Miknis; Mairis Kļava	55.25	10	—		56.12	18	56.35	16	2:47.72	+3.20
17	14	Romania	Mihai Țentea; Constantin Dinescu; Mihai Păcioianu; George Iordache	55.74	17	—		55.86	14	56.15	11	2:47.75	+3.23
18	20	United States	Geoffrey Gadbois; Collin Storms; Adrian Adams; Dylan Gilbert	56.03	21	—		56.14	19	56.49	18	2:48.66	+4.14
19	18	Czech Republic	Matěj Běhounek; Michal Dobeš; Antonín Wijas; Ondřej Rapp	55.84	19	—		56.10	17	56.82	19	2:48.76	+4.24
20	25	Canada	Jay Dearborn; Kenny Luketa M'Pindou; Cesar de Guzman; Tobi Ade	55.94	20	—		56.70	20	57.02	20	2:49.66	+5.14
21	23	South Korea	Suk Young-jin; Lee Kyung-yeon; Park Jong-hee; Jung Hyun-woo	56.27	22	—		56.70	20	Did not start			
22	19	Thailand	Kitthamat Palakai; Piyapong Wongpiyakul; Vorawut Maddulem; Sittiphon Donpritee	57.32	23	—		57.93	22	Did not start			
	13	China	Li Chunjian; Jiang Maoyuan; Shi Yaolong; An Tai	55.79	18	—		Did not finish					
	17	Austria	Jakob Mandlbauer; Sascha Stepan; Daiyehan Nichols-Bardi; Martin Bertschler	Did not start									
	24	Australia	Rhys Peters; Jermayne Takapautolo; Jack Pennington; Benjamin Forst	1:05.63	24	—		Did not start					
