= Switzerland at the 2026 Winter Olympics =

- Flag of Switzerland
- IOC code: SUI
- NOC: Swiss Olympic Association
- Website: www.swissolympic.ch (in German and French)

in Milan and Cortina d'Ampezzo, Italy 6 February 2026 – 22 February 2026
- Competitors: 175 (91 men and 84 women) in 14 sports
- Flag bearers (opening): Nino Niederreiter & Fanny Smith
- Flag bearer (closing): Alina Muller
- Medals Ranked 8th: Gold 6 Silver 9 Bronze 8 Total 23

Winter Olympics appearances (overview)
- 1924; 1928; 1932; 1936; 1948; 1952; 1956; 1960; 1964; 1968; 1972; 1976; 1980; 1984; 1988; 1992; 1994; 1998; 2002; 2006; 2010; 2014; 2018; 2022; 2026

Switzerland competed at the 2026 Winter Olympics in Milan and Cortina d'Ampezzo, Italy, from 6 to 22 February 2026.

== Competitors ==
The following is the list of number of competitors participating at the Games per sport/discipline.

Sport	Men	Women	Total
Alpine skiing	11	11	22
Biathlon	5	5	10
Bobsleigh	14	5	19
Cross-country skiing	5	7	12
Curling	5	6	11
Figure skating	1	2	3
Freestyle skiing	11	9	20
Ice hockey	25	23	48
Luge	0	1	1
Skeleton	1	0	1
Ski jumping	3	1	4
Ski mountaineering	2	2	4
Snowboarding	7	10	17
Speed skating	1	2	3
Total	91	84	175

== Medalists ==
The following Swiss competitors won medals at the games. In the discipline sections below, the medalists' names are bolded.

Medal	Name	Sport	Event	Date
Gold	Franjo von Allmen	Alpine skiing	Men's downhill	7 February
Gold	Mathilde Gremaud	Freestyle skiing	Women's slopestyle	9 February
Gold	Franjo von Allmen, Tanguy Nef	Alpine skiing	Men's team combined	9 February
Gold	Franjo von Allmen	Alpine skiing	Men's super-G	11 February
Gold	Loïc Meillard	Alpine skiing	Men's slalom	16 February
Gold	Marianne Fatton	Ski mountaineering	Women's sprint	19 February
Silver	Marco Odermatt, Loïc Meillard	Alpine skiing	Men's team combined	9 February
Silver	Marco Odermatt	Alpine skiing	Men's giant slalom	14 February
Silver	Nadja Kälin; Nadine Fähndrich	Cross-country skiing	Women's team sprint	18 February
Silver	Camille Rast	Alpine skiing	Women's slalom	18 February
Silver	Fanny Smith	Freestyle skiing	Women's ski cross	20 February
Silver	Noé Roth	Freestyle skiing	Men's aerials	20 February
Silver	Lina Kozomara; Pirmin Werner; Noé Roth	Freestyle skiing	Mixed team aerials	21 February
Silver	Marianne Fatton; Jon Kistler	Ski mountaineering	Mixed relay	21 February
Silver	Alina Pätz; Silvana Tirinzoni; Carole Howald; Selina Witschonke; Stefanie Berset	Curling	Women's tournament	22 February
Bronze	Gregor Deschwanden	Ski jumping	Men's normal hill	9 February
Bronze	Marco Odermatt	Alpine skiing	Men's super-G	11 February
Bronze	Loïc Meillard	Alpine skiing	Men's giant slalom	14 February
Bronze	Swiss women's team	Ice Hockey	Women's tournament	19 February
Bronze	Benoît Schwarz-van Berkel; Yannick Schwaller; Sven Michel; Pablo Lachat-Couchepin; Kim Schwaller	Curling	Men's	20 February
Bronze	Alex Fiva	Freestyle skiing	Men's ski cross	21 February
Bronze	Nadja Kälin	Cross-country skiing	Cross-country 50 km	22 February
Bronze	Michael Vogt; Andreas Haas; Amadou David Ndiaye; Mario Aeberhard	Bobsleigh	Four-man	22 February

Medals by sport
Sport	1st place, gold medalist(s)	2nd place, silver medalist(s)	3rd place, bronze medalist(s)	Total
Alpine skiing	4	3	2	9
Bobsleigh	0	0	1	1
Cross-country skiing	0	1	1	2
Curling	0	1	1	2
Freestyle skiing	1	3	1	5
Ice Hockey	0	0	1	1
Ski mountaineering	1	1	0	2
Ski jumping	0	0	1	1
Total	6	9	8	23

Medals by gender
Gender	1st place, gold medalist(s)	2nd place, silver medalist(s)	3rd place, bronze medalist(s)	Total
Male	4	3	6	**13**
Female	2	4	2	**8**
Mixed	0	2	0	**2**
Total	6	9	8	23

Medals by date
Day	Date	1st place, gold medalist(s)	2nd place, silver medalist(s)	3rd place, bronze medalist(s)	Total
1	7 February	1	0	0	1
2	8 February	0	0	0	0
3	9 February	2	1	1	4
4	10 February	0	0	0	0
5	11 February	1	0	1	2
6	12 February	0	0	0	0
7	13 February	0	0	0	0
8	14 February	0	1	1	2
9	15 February	0	0	0	0
10	16 February	1	0	0	1
11	17 February	0	0	0	0
12	18 February	0	2	0	2
13	19 February	1	0	1	2
14	20 February	0	2	1	3
15	21 February	0	2	1	3
16	22 February	0	1	2	3
Total		6	9	8	23

Multiple medalists
Athlete	Sport	1st place, gold medalist(s)	2nd place, silver medalist(s)	3rd place, bronze medalist(s)	Total
Franjo von Allmen	Alpine skiing	3	0	0	3
Loïc Meillard	Alpine skiing	1	1	1	3
Marco Odermatt	Alpine skiing	0	2	1	3
Marianne Fatton	Ski mountaineering	1	1	0	2
Noé Roth	Freestyle skiing	0	2	0	2
Nadja Kaelin	Cross-country skiing	0	1	1	2

== Alpine skiing ==
Switzerland qualified the maximum eleven male and eleven female alpine skiers.

Men

Athlete	Event	Run 1		Run 2		Total	
Athlete	Event	Time	Rank	Time	Rank	Time	Rank
Alexis Monney	Downhill	—N/a				1:52.36	5
Marco Odermatt	Downhill	—N/a				1:52.31	4
Stefan Rogentin	Downhill	—N/a				1:54.18	23
Franjo von Allmen	Downhill	—N/a				1:51.61	1st place, gold medalist(s)
Alexis Monney	Super-G	—N/a				1:26.22	10
Marco Odermatt	Super-G	—N/a				1:25.60	3rd place, bronze medalist(s)
Stefan Rogentin	Super-G	—N/a				1:26.14	9
Franjo von Allmen	Super-G	—N/a				1:25.32	1st place, gold medalist(s)
Luca Aerni	Giant slalom	1:16.89	21	1:11.30	17	2:28.19	18
Loïc Meillard	Giant slalom	1:15.49	3	1:10.68	5	2:26.45	3rd place, bronze medalist(s)
Marco Odermatt	Giant slalom	1:14.87	2	1:10.71	6	2:26.17	2nd place, silver medalist(s)
Thomas Tumler	Giant slalom	1:15.81	4	1:10.64	3	2:26.45	4
Matthias Iten	Slalom	58.96	16	57.27	6	1:55.58	11
Loïc Meillard	Slalom	56.73	2	56.81	1	1:53.96	1st place, gold medalist(s)
Tanguy Nef	Slalom	58.46	11	57.17	5	1:55.63	6
Daniel Yule	Slalom	59.42	18	57.48	12	1:56.90	15
Alexis Monney; Daniel Yule	Team combined	1:51.97	2	54.02	19	2:45.99	13
Marco Odermatt; Loïc Meillard	Team combined	1:52.08	3	52.95	15	2:45.03	2nd place, silver medalist(s)
Stefan Rogentin; Matthias Iten	Team combined	1:53.64	14	53.44	17	2:47.08	18
Franjo von Allmen; Tanguy Nef	Team combined	1:52.22	4	51.82	1	2:44.04	1st place, gold medalist(s)

Women

Athlete	Event	Run 1		Run 2		Total	
Athlete	Event	Time	Rank	Time	Rank	Time	Rank
Malorie Blanc	Downhill	—N/a				1:38.77	19
Jasmine Flury	Downhill	—N/a				1:38.51	18
Janine Schmitt	Downhill	—N/a				1:38.28	17
Corinne Suter	Downhill	—N/a				1:38.01	14
Malorie Blanc	Super-G	—N/a				1:24.65	10
Delia Durrer	Super-G	—N/a				1:25.95	17
Janine Schmitt	Super-G	—N/a				DNF	-
Corinne Suter	Super-G	—N/a				1:24.80	11
Wendy Holdener	Giant slalom	DNS					
Vanessa Kasper	Giant slalom	1:05.34	23	1:10.48	19	2:15.82	23
Sue Piller	Giant slalom	1:05.56	28	1:10.29	15	2:15.85	24
Camille Rast	Giant slalom	1:04.37	12	1:10.12	10	2:14.49	12
Eliane Christen	Slalom	49.63	22	DNF	-	DNF	-
Wendy Holdener	Slalom	48.29	5	52.74	14	1:41.03	4
Mélanie Meillard	Slalom	49.07	14	52.18	3	1:41.25	7
Camille Rast	Slalom	48.18	4	52.42	5	1:40.60	2nd place, silver medalist(s)
Delia Durrer; Eliane Christen	Team combined	1:39.06	18	DNF	-	DNF	-
Jasmine Flury; Wendy Holdener	Team combined	1:38.13	13	44.41	2	2:22.54	6
Janine Schmitt; Mélanie Meillard	Team combined	1:38.50	16	DNF	-	DNF	-
Corinne Suter; Camille Rast	Team combined	1:38.10	12	44.80	3	2:22.90	9

== Biathlon ==
Switzerland qualified five female and five male biathletes through the 2024–25 Biathlon World Cup score.

Men

Athlete	Event	Time	Misses	Rank
Joscha Burkhalter	Individual (20 km)	57:22.0	3	36
Jeremy Finello	Individual (20 km)	59:44.9	7	63
Niklas Hartweg	Individual (20 km)	59:11.5	6	59
Sebastian Stalder	Individual (20 km)	59:18.3	3	60
Joscha Burkhalter	Sprint (10 km)	24:15.4	0	14
Jeremy Finello	Sprint (10 km)	26:41.1	4	76
Niklas Hartweg	Sprint (10 km)	24:32.0	2	17
Sebastian Stalder	Sprint (10 km)	24:26.8	0	15
Joscha Burkhalter	Pursuit (12.5 km)	35:01.4	4	33
Niklas Hartweg	Pursuit (12.5 km)	34:24.2	5	27
Sebastian Stalder	Pursuit (12.5 km)	34:23.2	2	26
Joscha Burkhalter; Niklas Hartweg; Sebastian Stalder; Jeremy Finello	Relay (4×7.5 km)	1:22:36.6	14 (2+12)	8
Joscha Burkhalter	Mass start (15 km)	41:49.1	2	11
Niklas Hartweg	Mass start (15 km)	44:07.5	6	24
Sebastian Stalder	Mass start (15 km)	42:07.0	1	13

Women

Athlete	Event	Time	Misses	Rank
Amy Baserga	Individual (15 km)	45:10.0	3	39
Aita Gasparin	Individual (15 km)	44:58.2	2	35
Lena Häcki-Groß	Individual (15 km)	45:21.0	3	42
Lea Meier	Individual (15 km)	42:53.0	1	7
Amy Baserga	Sprint (7.5 km)	22:27.0	1	29
Aita Gasparin	Sprint (7.5 km)	23:04.9	1	55
Lena Häcki-Groß	Sprint (7.5 km)	23:20.3	4	60
Lea Meier	Sprint (7.5 km)	21:57.3	0	13
Amy Baserga	Pursuit (10 km)	33:08.5	3	27
Aita Gasparin	Pursuit (10 km)	34:25.3	3	44
Lena Häcki-Groß	Pursuit (10 km)	35:18.5	6	54
Lea Meier	Pursuit (10 km)	32:53.4	5	24
Amy Baserga; Aita Gasparin; Lena Häcki-Groß; Lea Meier	Relay (4×6 km)	1:13:10.3	11 (1+10)	8
Amy Baserga	Mass start (12.5 km)	39:31.2	3	21
Lea Meier	Mass start (12.5 km)	40:18.4	4	24

Mixed

Athlete	Event	Time	Misses	Rank
Sebastian Stalder; Niklas Hartweg; Lea Meier; Amy Baserga	Relay (4×6 km)	1:07:14.0	1+7	10

== Bobsleigh ==
Switzerland qualified four female and twelve male bobathletes. Swiss Olympic selected five female athletes (one alternate) and fourteen male athletes (two alternates)

Men

Athlete	Event	Heat 1		Heat 2		Heat 3		Heat 4		Total	
Athlete	Event	Time	Rank	Time	Rank	Time	Rank	Time	Rank	Time	Rank
Michael Vogt; Amadou David Ndiaye	Two-man	55.64	7	55.85	7	55.47	7	55.64	8	3:42.60	6
Timo Rohner; Tim Annen	Two-man	55.95	14	56.14	14	55.89	15	55.84	11	3:43.82	15
Cédric Follador; Luca Rolli	Two-man	56.17	17	56.09	13	55.87	14	55.68	9	3:43.81	16
Cédric Follador; Luca Rolli; Tim Annen; Omar Vogele	Four-man	54.49	4	54.91	8	54.69	7	54.94	7	3:39.03	6
Timo Rohner; Pascal Moser; Mathieu Hersperger; Cyril Bieri	Four-man	54.99	13	55.16	14	54.92	11	55.26	18	3:40.33	15
Michael Vogt; Andreas Haas; Amadou David Ndiaye; Mario Aeberhard	Four-man	54.53	6	54.79	4	54.55	3	54.77	2	3:38.64	3rd place, bronze medalist(s)

Women

Athlete	Event	Heat 1		Heat 2		Heat 3		Heat 4		Total	
Athlete	Event	Time	Rank	Time	Rank	Time	Rank	Time	Rank	Time	Rank
Melaine Hasler	Monobob	59.98	5	59.92	5	59.72	9	59.37	1	3:58.99	5
Debora Annen	Monobob	1:00.55	17	1:00.32	13	1:00.16	14	59.73	10	4:00.76	11
Debora Annen; Salome Kora	Two-woman	57.42	10	57.61	9	57.95	8	57.63	7	3:50.49	7
Melaine Hasler; Nadja Pasternack	Two-woman	57.22	7	57.61	9	57.83	7	57.62	6	3:50.40	6

== Cross-country skiing ==
Switzerland qualified one female and one male cross-country skier through the basic quota. Following the completion of the 2024–25 FIS Cross-Country World Cup, Switzerland qualified a further six female and four male athletes.

=== Men ===
Athlete	Event	Classical		Pitstop	Freestyle		Final		
Athlete	Event	Time	Rank	Pitstop	Time	Rank	Time	Deficit	Rank
Beda Klee	10 km freestyle	—N/a					21:52.3	+1:16.1	21
Beda Klee	20 km skiathlon	25:13.4	39	26.6	24:59.0	50	50:39.0	+4:28.0	46
Noe Näff	10 km freestyle	—N/a					23:27.5	+2:51.3	59
Nicola Wigger	10 km freestyle	—N/a					21:57.1	+1:20.9	24
Nicola Wigger	20 km skiathlon	24:23.7	24	25.5	24:01.9	34	48:51.1	+2:40.1	30
Valerio Grond; Beda Klee; Noe Näff; Nicola Wigger	Relay (4×7.5 km)	—N/a					1:07:09.5	+2:45.0	10
Beda Klee	Classical (50 km)	—N/a					2:14:45.1	+8:00.3	14
Nicola Wigger	Classical (50 km)	—N/a					2:15:37.8	+8:53.0	19

=== Women ===
Athlete	Event	Classical		Pitstop	Freestyle		Final		
Athlete	Event	Time	Rank	Pitstop	Time	Rank	Time	Deficit	Rank
Fabienne Alder	20 km skiathlon	30:58.3	45	36.8	30:16.4	45	1:01:51.5	+8:06.3	46
Nadine Fähndrich	10 km freestyle	—N/a					24:35.8	+1:46.6	16
Lea Fischer	10 km freestyle	—N/a					26:08.7	+3:19.5	52
Marina Kälin	10 km freestyle	—N/a					24:54.2	+2:05.0	23
Marina Kälin	20 km skiathlon	28:55.0	18	30.3	28:21.2	23	57:46.5	+4:01.3	19
Nadja Kälin	10 km freestyle	—N/a					24:31.3	+1:42.1	14
Nadja Kälin	20 km skiathlon	28:05.4	8	31.4	26:59.9	6	55:36.7	+1:51.5	4
Anja Weber	20 km skiathlon	29:00.8	19	31.5	28:33.5	28	58:05.8	+4:20.6	25
Nadine Fähndrich; Marina Kälin; Nadja Kälin; Anja Weber	Relay (4×7.5 km)	—N/a					1:18:02.1	+2:17.3	7
Nadja Kälin	Classical (50 km)	—N/a					2:23:09.7	+6:41.5	3rd place, bronze medalist(s)

=== Sprint ===
==== Men ====
Athlete	Event	Qualification		Quarterfinal		Semifinal		Final	
Athlete	Event	Time	Rank	Time	Rank	Time	Rank	Time	Rank
Valerio Grond	Sprint	3:14.81	8 Q	3:32.54	4	DNA			
Noe Näff	Sprint	3:14.23	6 Q	3:39.13	4	DNA			
Janik Riebli	Sprint	3:15.81	12 Q	3:39.80	5	DNA			
Janik Riebli; Valerio Grond	Men's team	5:50.34	4 Q	—N/a				18:33.20	4

==== Women ====
Athlete	Event	Qualification		Quarterfinal		Semifinal		Final	
Athlete	Event	Time	Rank	Time	Rank	Time	Rank	Time	Rank
Nadine Fähndrich	Sprint	3:39.87	5 Q	3:57.49	5	DNA			
Lea Fischer	Sprint	3:48.82	29 Q	4:00.74	4	DNA			
Alina Meier	Sprint	3:50.85	31	DNA					
Anja Weber	Sprint	3:47.27	23 Q	3:56.54	4	DNA			
Nadja Kälin; Nadine Fähndrich	Women's team	6:47.54	4 Q	—N/a				20:31.39	2nd place, silver medalist(s)

== Curling ==
=== Summary ===
Team	Event	Group stage										Semifinal	Final / BM	
Team	Event	Opposition Score	Opposition Score	Opposition Score	Opposition Score	Opposition Score	Opposition Score	Opposition Score	Opposition Score	Opposition Score	Rank	Opposition Score	Opposition Score	Rank
Benoît Schwarz-van Berkel; Yannick Schwaller; Sven Michel; Pablo Lachat-Couchepin; Kim Schwaller	Men's tournament	USA; W 8–3	CZE; W 7–3	CHN; W 9–7	CAN; W 9–5	GBR; W 6–5	SWE; W 9–4	GER; W 8–4	NOR; W 10–4	ITA; W 9–5	1 Q	GBR; L 5–8	NOR; W 9–1	3rd place, bronze medalist(s)
Alina Pätz; Silvana Tirinzoni; Carole Howald; Selina Witschonke; Stefanie Berset	Women's tournament	ITA; W 7–4	CHN; W 7–5	JPN; L 5–7	CAN; W 8–7	SWE; L 4–6	GBR; W 10–6	KOR; W 7–5	DEN; W 6–4	USA; L 6–7	3 Q	USA; W 7–4	SWE; L 5–6	2nd place, silver medalist(s)
Briar Schwaller-Hürlimann; Yannick Schwaller	Mixed doubles tournament	EST; W 9–7	USA; L 4–7	KOR; W 8–5	ITA; L 4–12	SWE; L 7–13	CZE; W 10–3	GBR; W 7–6	NOR; L 3–6	CAN; L 4–8	7	DNA		

=== Men's tournament ===
Switzerland qualified a men's team by earning enough points in the last two World Curling Championships. Team Yannick Schwaller qualified as Swiss representatives by representing the country at both the European and World Championships during the 2023–24 and 2024–25 seasons.

Final Round Robin Standings
Team	Skip	Pld	W	L	W–L	PF	PA	EW	EL	BE	SE	S%	DSC	Qualification
Switzerland	Yannick Schwaller	9	9	0	–	75	40	42	30	3	8	88.7%	9.506	Playoffs
Canada	Brad Jacobs	9	7	2	–	63	45	40	28	8	13	86.5%	28.844	Playoffs
Norway	Magnus Ramsfjell	9	5	4	1–0	60	61	37	38	6	7	80.8%	26.938	Playoffs
Great Britain	Bruce Mouat	9	5	4	0–1	63	48	39	33	2	10	86.4%	16.613	Playoffs
United States	Daniel Casper	9	4	5	1–1	52	65	34	37	5	3	81.7%	17.663	
Italy	Joël Retornaz	9	4	5	1–1	58	67	33	39	6	7	83.0%	17.869	
Germany	Marc Muskatewitz	9	4	5	1–1	51	57	36	37	8	7	84.4%	24.850	
Czech Republic	Lukáš Klíma	9	3	6	–	54	63	35	41	3	5	79.8%	29.013	
Sweden	Niklas Edin	9	2	7	1–0	44	63	31	39	6	3	82.5%	26.000	
China	Xu Xiaoming	9	2	7	0–1	52	63	35	40	3	5	81.4%	34.875	

Source: Official website

Round robin
Switzerland had a bye in draws 1, 6 and 8.

Draw 2
Thursday, 12 February, 14:05

Sheet B	1	2	3	4	5	6	7	8	9	10	Final
United States (Casper)	0	1	0	0	1	0	0	1	X	X	3
Switzerland (Schwaller) 🔨	1	0	0	2	0	3	2	0	X	X	8

Draw 3
Friday, 13 February, 9:05

Sheet D	1	2	3	4	5	6	7	8	9	10	Final
Switzerland (Schwaller) 🔨	2	0	0	2	1	0	2	0	X	X	7
Czech Republic (Klíma)	0	0	1	0	0	1	0	1	X	X	3

Draw 4
Friday, 13 February, 19:05

Sheet A	1	2	3	4	5	6	7	8	9	10	Final
Switzerland (Schwaller)	0	2	0	3	0	1	0	1	1	1	9
China (Xu) 🔨	2	0	1	0	2	0	2	0	0	0	7

Draw 5
Saturday, 14 February, 14:05

Sheet C	1	2	3	4	5	6	7	8	9	10	Final
Switzerland (Schwaller) 🔨	2	0	2	0	2	0	2	0	1	X	9
Canada (Jacobs)	0	2	0	1	0	1	0	1	0	X	5

Draw 7
Sunday, 15 February, 19:05

Sheet D	1	2	3	4	5	6	7	8	9	10	11	Final
Great Britain (Mouat)	0	1	1	0	1	0	0	1	0	1	0	5
Switzerland (Schwaller) 🔨	1	0	0	1	0	0	2	0	1	0	1	6

Draw 9
Tuesday, 17 February, 9:05

Sheet B	1	2	3	4	5	6	7	8	9	10	Final
Switzerland (Schwaller) 🔨	2	2	0	0	2	0	3	X	X	X	9
Sweden (Edin)	0	0	1	0	0	3	0	X	X	X	4

Draw 10
Tuesday, 17 February, 19:05

Sheet A	1	2	3	4	5	6	7	8	9	10	Final
Germany (Muskatewitz)	0	0	1	0	1	0	0	2	X	X	4
Switzerland (Schwaller) 🔨	2	0	0	2	0	3	1	0	X	X	8

Draw 11
Wednesday, 18 February, 14:05

Sheet C	1	2	3	4	5	6	7	8	9	10	Final
Norway (Ramsfjell)	0	1	0	2	0	0	1	0	X	X	4
Switzerland (Schwaller) 🔨	2	0	1	0	2	1	0	4	X	X	10

Draw 12
Thursday, 19 February, 9:05

Sheet B	1	2	3	4	5	6	7	8	9	10	Final
Italy (Retornaz)	0	0	0	1	0	2	0	2	0	X	5
Switzerland (Schwaller) 🔨	2	0	1	0	1	0	3	0	2	X	9

Semifinal

Thursday, 19 February, 19:35

Sheet B	1	2	3	4	5	6	7	8	9	10	Final
Switzerland (Schwaller) 🔨	0	2	0	2	0	0	1	0	0	0	5
Great Britain (Mouat)	0	0	2	0	1	1	0	2	0	2	8

Bronze medal game

Friday, 20 February, 19:05

Sheet C	1	2	3	4	5	6	7	8	9	10	Final
Switzerland (Schwaller) 🔨	0	3	1	0	0	0	0	2	3	X	9
Norway (Ramsfjell)	0	0	0	0	1	0	0	0	0	X	1

=== Women's tournament ===
Switzerland qualified a women's team by earning enough points in the last two World Curling Championships. Team Silvana Tirinzoni qualified as Swiss representatives by representing the country at both the European and World Championships during the 2023–24 and 2024–25 seasons.

Final Round Robin Standings
Team	Skip	Pld	W	L	W–L	PF	PA	EW	EL	BE	SE	S%	DSC	Qualification
Sweden	Anna Hasselborg	9	7	2	–	65	50	45	32	5	14	81.7%	25.806	Playoffs
United States	Tabitha Peterson	9	6	3	2–0	60	54	40	37	3	13	82.1%	34.288	Playoffs
Switzerland	Silvana Tirinzoni	9	6	3	1–1	60	51	35	42	6	4	85.0%	44.338	Playoffs
Canada	Rachel Homan	9	6	3	0–2	76	59	45	38	2	9	80.3%	19.781	Playoffs
South Korea	Gim Eun-ji	9	5	4	1–0	60	53	37	35	8	11	81.2%	23.581	
Great Britain	Sophie Jackson	9	5	4	0–1	58	58	36	36	10	8	83.4%	16.938	
Denmark	Madeleine Dupont	9	4	5	–	49	58	36	38	3	11	77.0%	37.875	
Japan	Sayaka Yoshimura	9	2	7	1–1	51	69	35	43	3	6	78.6%	27.513	
Italy	Stefania Constantini	9	2	7	1–1	47	60	34	40	3	4	78.8%	34.719	
China	Wang Rui	9	2	7	1–1	56	70	37	39	3	9	82.7%	41.206	

Source: Official website

Round robin
Switzerland had a bye in draws 2, 6 and 10.

Draw 1
Thursday, 12 February, 9:05

Sheet C	1	2	3	4	5	6	7	8	9	10	Final
Italy (Constantini) 🔨	1	0	0	1	0	1	0	0	1	X	4
Switzerland (Tirinzoni)	0	2	0	0	2	0	2	1	0	X	7

Draw 3
Friday, 13 February, 14:05

Sheet B	1	2	3	4	5	6	7	8	9	10	Final
China (Wang)	0	0	1	1	0	1	0	0	2	X	5
Switzerland (Tirinzoni) 🔨	0	1	0	0	2	0	3	1	0	X	7

Draw 4
Saturday, 14 February, 9:05

Sheet D	1	2	3	4	5	6	7	8	9	10	Final
Switzerland (Tirinzoni) 🔨	2	0	1	0	0	1	0	0	1	0	5
Japan (Yoshimura)	0	1	0	2	0	0	2	1	0	1	7

Draw 5
Saturday, 14 February, 19:05

Sheet A	1	2	3	4	5	6	7	8	9	10	11	Final
Canada (Homan) 🔨	1	1	2	0	0	1	0	1	0	1	0	7
Switzerland (Tirinzoni)	0	0	0	1	1	0	4	0	1	0	1	8

Draw 7
Monday, 16 February, 9:05

Sheet B	1	2	3	4	5	6	7	8	9	10	Final
Sweden (Hasselborg) 🔨	0	1	0	2	0	1	0	1	0	1	6
Switzerland (Tirinzoni)	0	0	2	0	1	0	0	0	1	0	4

Draw 8
Monday, 16 February, 19:05

Sheet C	1	2	3	4	5	6	7	8	9	10	Final
Switzerland (Tirinzoni)	0	0	2	0	1	0	3	0	4	X	10
Great Britain (Jackson) 🔨	0	1	0	1	0	2	0	2	0	X	6

Draw 9
Tuesday, 17 February, 14:05

Sheet D	1	2	3	4	5	6	7	8	9	10	Final
South Korea (Gim) 🔨	1	0	1	1	0	0	0	1	0	1	5
Switzerland (Tirinzoni)	0	3	0	0	0	1	1	0	2	0	7

Draw 11
Wednesday, 18 February, 19:05

Sheet B	1	2	3	4	5	6	7	8	9	10	Final
Switzerland (Tirinzoni) 🔨	0	2	0	0	0	0	0	1	0	3	6
Denmark (Dupont)	0	0	0	0	2	1	0	0	1	0	4

Draw 12
Thursday, 19 February, 14:30

Sheet A	1	2	3	4	5	6	7	8	9	10	11	Final
Switzerland (Tirinzoni)	0	0	1	0	0	1	0	1	0	3	0	6
United States (Peterson) 🔨	0	1	0	1	1	0	2	0	1	0	1	7

Semifinal

Friday, 20 February, 14:05

Sheet D	1	2	3	4	5	6	7	8	9	10	Final
United States (Peterson) 🔨	1	0	1	0	1	0	0	0	1	0	4
Switzerland (Tirinzoni)	0	2	0	2	0	0	0	1	0	2	7

Gold medal game

Sunday, 22 February, 11:05

Sheet C	1	2	3	4	5	6	7	8	9	10	Final
Sweden (Hasselborg) 🔨	2	0	0	0	1	0	1	1	0	1	6
Switzerland (Tirinzoni)	0	0	0	1	0	2	0	0	2	0	5

=== Mixed doubles tournament ===
Switzerland qualified a mixed doubles team by earning enough points in the last two World Curling Championships. Briar Schwaller-Hürlimann and Yannick Schwaller qualified as Swiss representatives by meeting the minimum requirement of qualifying for the playoffs at the 2024 World Mixed Doubles Curling Championship.

Final Round Robin Standings
Team	Athletes	Pld	W	L	W–L	PF	PA	EW	EL	BE	SE	S%	DSC	Qualification
Great Britain	Jennifer Dodds / Bruce Mouat	9	8	1	–	69	46	37	30	0	11	79.6%	20.931	Playoffs
Italy	Stefania Constantini / Amos Mosaner	9	6	3	1–0	60	50	32	31	1	11	78.3%	27.931	Playoffs
United States	Cory Thiesse / Korey Dropkin	9	6	3	0–1	58	45	36	33	0	12	83.1%	25.900	Playoffs
Sweden	Isabella Wranå / Rasmus Wranå	9	5	4	–	62	55	31	34	0	9	80.1%	19.413	Playoffs
Canada	Jocelyn Peterman / Brett Gallant	9	4	5	2–0	58	52	35	31	0	10	78.5%	36.050	
Norway	Kristin Skaslien / Magnus Nedregotten	9	4	5	1–1	52	47	37	33	0	12	77.1%	24.444	
Switzerland	Briar Schwaller-Hürlimann / Yannick Schwaller	9	4	5	0–2	56	67	32	35	0	6	74.5%	24.000	
Czech Republic	Julie Zelingrová / Vít Chabičovský	9	3	6	1–0	45	62	30	34	0	6	69.1%	16.019	
South Korea	Kim Seon-yeong / Jeong Yeong-seok	9	3	6	0–1	47	64	32	34	0	9	75.1%	42.425	
Estonia	Marie Kaldvee / Harri Lill	9	2	7	–	46	65	32	39	0	7	71.6%	19.300	

Source: Official website

Round robin
Switzerland had a bye in draws 2, 6, 8, and 10.

Draw 1
Wednesday, 4 February, 19:05

Sheet D	1	2	3	4	5	6	7	8	9	Final
Estonia (Kaldvee / Lill)	0	1	0	0	0	2	0	4	0	7
Switzerland (Schwaller-Hürlimann / Schwaller) 🔨	1	0	2	1	1	0	2	0	2	9

Draw 3
Thursday, 5 February, 14:35

Sheet A	1	2	3	4	5	6	7	8	Final
United States (Thiesse / Dropkin)	1	0	2	2	0	2	0	X	7
Switzerland (Schwaller-Hürlimann / Schwaller) 🔨	0	2	0	0	1	0	1	X	4

Draw 4
Thursday, 5 February, 19:05

Sheet B	1	2	3	4	5	6	7	8	Final
Switzerland (Schwaller-Hürlimann / Schwaller) 🔨	1	0	4	0	1	0	2	X	8
South Korea (Kim / Jeong)	0	2	0	1	0	2	0	X	5

Draw 5
Friday, 6 February, 10:05

Sheet C	1	2	3	4	5	6	7	8	Final
Italy (Constantini / Mosaner) 🔨	3	0	0	4	3	2	X	X	12
Switzerland (Schwaller-Hürlimann / Schwaller)	0	3	1	0	0	0	X	X	4

Draw 7
Saturday, 7 February, 10:05

Sheet D	1	2	3	4	5	6	7	8	Final
Switzerland (Schwaller-Hürlimann / Schwaller)	0	1	0	4	0	2	0	0	7
Sweden (Wranå / Wranå) 🔨	1	0	2	0	4	0	3	3	13

Draw 9
Saturday, 7 February, 19:05

Sheet C	1	2	3	4	5	6	7	8	Final
Czech Republic (Zelingrová / Chabičovský) 🔨	0	1	0	1	0	1	0	X	3
Switzerland (Schwaller-Hürlimann / Schwaller)	2	0	1	0	4	0	3	X	10

Draw 11
Sunday, 8 February, 14:35

Sheet B	1	2	3	4	5	6	7	8	Final
Great Britain (Dodds / Mouat)	0	0	0	2	2	0	2	0	6
Switzerland (Schwaller-Hürlimann / Schwaller) 🔨	1	2	1	0	0	1	0	2	7

Draw 12
Sunday, 8 February, 19:05

Sheet C	1	2	3	4	5	6	7	8	Final
Switzerland (Schwaller-Hürlimann / Schwaller)	0	1	0	1	0	1	0	0	3
Norway (Skaslien / Nedregotten) 🔨	1	0	1	0	1	0	2	1	6

Draw 13
Monday, 9 February, 10:05

Sheet A	1	2	3	4	5	6	7	8	Final
Switzerland (Schwaller-Hürlimann / Schwaller) 🔨	0	0	2	0	0	2	0	X	4
Canada (Peterman / Gallant)	1	2	0	1	1	0	3	X	8

== Figure skating ==
In the 2025 World Figure Skating Championships in Boston, the United States, Switzerland secured one quota in each of the men's singles, and two quota in each of the women's singles.

Athlete	Event	SP/SD		FP/FD		Total	
Athlete	Event	Points	Rank	Points	Rank	Points	Rank
Lukas Britschgi	Men's singles	80.87	19 Q	165.77	13	246.64	14
Kimmy Repond	Women's singles	59.20	21 Q	100.34	24	159.54	23
Livia Kaiser	Women's singles	55.69	23 Q	115.83	20	171.52	21

== Freestyle skiing ==
=== Aerials ===
Athlete	Event	Qualification				Final				Rank
Athlete	Event	Jump 1		Jump 2		Jump 1		Jump 2		Rank
Athlete	Event	Points	Rank	Points	Rank	Points	Rank	Points	Rank	Rank
Noé Roth	Men's aerials	109.05	8	111.06	12 Q	131.56	1 FA	131.58	2	2nd place, silver medalist(s)
Pirmin Werner	Men's aerials	122.17	1 Q	DNI		127.50	2 FA	99.32	5	5
Lina Kozomara	Women's aerials	57.71	19	58.50	16	DNA				
Noé Roth; Pirmin Werner; Lina Kozomara	Mixed team	—N/a				278.48	4 FA	296.91	2	2nd place, silver medalist(s)

=== Freeski ===
Men

Athlete	Event	Qualification					Final				
Athlete	Event	Run 1	Run 2	Run 3	Best	Rank	Run 1	Run 2	Run 3	Best	Rank
Andri Ragettli	Men's slopestyle	75.00	20.95	—N/a	75.00	5 FA	78.65	19.80	21.03	78.65	4
Fabian Bosch	Men's slopestyle	21.83	40.28	—N/a	40.28	22	DNA				
Kim Gubser	Men's slopestyle	64.10	56.80	—N/a	64.10	12 FA	22.21	16.61	57.68	57.68	10
Nils Rhyner	Men's slopestyle	20.58	35.81	—N/a	35.81	25	DNA				
Andri Ragettli	Men's big air	19.75	22.50	82.00	82.00	27	DNA				
Fabian Bosch	Men's big air	82.00	84.75	88.00	170.00	13	DNA				
Kim Gubser	Men's big air	83.50	79.00	DNI	162.50	16	DNA				
Nils Rhyner	Men's big air	77.00	53.50	73.25	150.25	17	DNA				
Robin Briguet	Men's halfpipe	58.25	DNI	—N/a	58.25	18	DNA				

Women

Athlete	Event	Qualification					Final				
Athlete	Event	Run 1	Run 2	Run 3	Best	Rank	Run 1	Run 2	Run 3	Best	Rank
Mathilde Gremaud	Women's slopestyle	76.68	79.15	—N/a	79.15	1 FA	83.60	86.96	15.46	86.96	1st place, gold medalist(s)
Sarah Hoefflin	Women's slopestyle	21.73	54.50	—N/a	54.50	13	DNA				
Giulia Tanno	Women's slopestyle	17.60	57.01	—N/a	57.01	10 FA	65.85	41.31	56.55	65.85	6
Mathilde Gremaud	Women's big air	85.25	83.75	DNI	169.00	3 FA	DNS				
Sarah Hoefflin	Women's big air	21.75	35.00	DNS	35.00	27	DNA				
Giulia Tanno	Women's big air	23.50	79.75	71.75	151.50	13	DNA				
Anouk Andraska	Women's big air	47.25	72.25	80.00	152.25	12 FA	DNS				

=== Ski cross ===
Men

Athlete	Event	Seeding		1/8 final	Quarterfinal	Semifinal	Final	
Athlete	Event	Time	Rank	Position	Position	Position	Position	Rank
Tobias Baur	Men's ski cross	1:07.89	16	3	DNA			
Romain Détraz	Men's ski cross	1:07.78	13	3	DNA			
Alex Fiva	Men's ski cross	1:07.56	11	1	1 Q	1 FA	3	3rd place, bronze medalist(s)
Ryan Regez	Men's ski cross	1:07.18	3	1	2 Q	RAL	DNA	

Women

Athlete	Event	Seeding		1/8 final	Quarterfinal	Semifinal	Final	
Athlete	Event	Time	Rank	Position	Position	Position	Position	Rank
Sixtine Cousin	Women's ski cross	1:13.92	13	2 Q	2 Q	4	DNA	
Talina Gantenbein	Women's ski cross	1:12.78	5	1 Q	1 Q	3	DNA	
Saskja Lack	Women's ski cross	1:12.36	4	1 Q	4	DNA		
Fanny Smith	Women's ski cross	1:12.14	3	2 Q	1 Q	2 FA	2	2nd place, silver medalist(s)

Qualification legend: Q - Qualify to next round; FA - Qualify to medal final; FB - Qualify to consolation final

== Ice hockey ==
=== Summary ===
Key:

- OT – Overtime
- GWS – Match decided by penalty-shootout

Team	Event	Group stage					Qualification playoff	Quarterfinal	Semifinal	Final / BM	
Team	Event	Opposition Score	Opposition Score	Opposition Score	Opposition Score	Rank	Opposition Score	Opposition Score	Opposition Score	Opposition Score	Rank
Switzerland men's	Men's tournament	France; W 4–0	Canada; L 1–5	Czechia; W 4–3 ^{OT}	—N/a	2 Q	Italy; W 3–0	Finland; L 2–3 ^{OT}	DNA		5
Switzerland women's	Women's tournament	Czechia; W 4–3 ^{GWS}	Canada; L 0–4	United States; L 0–5	Finland; L 1–3	5 Q	—N/a	Finland; W 1–0	Canada; L 1–2	Sweden w 2–1 ^{OT}	3rd place, bronze medalist(s)

=== Men's tournament ===
Switzerland men's national ice hockey team qualified a team of 25 players by finishing 7th in the 2023 IIHF World Ranking.

==== Roster ====
The first six players of Switzerland's roster were announced on 16 June 2025. The rest of the roster was announced on 7 January 2026. On 10 February, Roman Josi was named Switzerland's captain, with Kevin Fiala, Andrea Glauser, Nico Hischier, and Nino Niederreiter named alternate captains.

Head coach: Patrick Fischer

No.	Pos.	Name	Height	Weight	Birthdate	Team
8	F	Simon Knak	1.85 m (6 ft 1 in)	92 kg (203 lb)	27 January 2002 (aged 24)	(Switzerland) HC Davos
9	F	Damien Riat	1.83 m (6 ft 0 in)	85 kg (187 lb)	26 February 1997 (aged 28)	(Switzerland) Lausanne HC
13	F	Nico Hischier – A	1.85 m (6 ft 1 in)	91 kg (201 lb)	4 January 1999 (aged 27)	(United States) New Jersey Devils
14	D	Dean Kukan	1.88 m (6 ft 2 in)	89 kg (196 lb)	8 July 1993 (aged 32)	(Switzerland) ZSC Lions
17	F	Ken Jäger	1.85 m (6 ft 1 in)	83 kg (183 lb)	30 May 1998 (aged 27)	(Switzerland) Lausanne HC
20	G	Reto Berra	1.96 m (6 ft 5 in)	100 kg (220 lb)	3 January 1987 (aged 39)	(Switzerland) HC Fribourg-Gottéron
21	F	Kevin Fiala – A	1.80 m (5 ft 11 in)	93 kg (205 lb)	22 July 1996 (aged 29)	(United States) Los Angeles Kings
22	F	Nino Niederreiter – A	1.88 m (6 ft 2 in)	99 kg (218 lb)	8 September 1992 (aged 33)	(Canada) Winnipeg Jets
23	F	Philipp Kurashev	1.83 m (6 ft 0 in)	86 kg (190 lb)	12 October 1999 (aged 26)	(United States) San Jose Sharks
28	F	Timo Meier	1.83 m (6 ft 0 in)	100 kg (220 lb)	8 October 1996 (aged 29)	(United States) New Jersey Devils
40	G	Akira Schmid	1.96 m (6 ft 5 in)	86 kg (190 lb)	12 May 2000 (aged 25)	(United States) Vegas Golden Knights
43	D	Andrea Glauser – A	1.83 m (6 ft 0 in)	86 kg (190 lb)	3 April 1996 (aged 29)	(Switzerland) HC Fribourg-Gottéron
44	F	Pius Suter	1.80 m (5 ft 11 in)	80 kg (176 lb)	24 May 1996 (aged 29)	(United States) St. Louis Blues
45	D	Michael Fora	1.93 m (6 ft 4 in)	97 kg (214 lb)	30 October 1995 (aged 30)	(Switzerland) HC Davos
54	D	Christian Marti	1.91 m (6 ft 3 in)	98 kg (216 lb)	29 March 1993 (aged 32)	(Switzerland) ZSC Lions
56	D	Tim Berni	1.83 m (6 ft 0 in)	87 kg (192 lb)	11 February 2000 (aged 26)	(Switzerland) Genève-Servette HC
62	F	Denis Malgin	1.75 m (5 ft 9 in)	81 kg (179 lb)	18 January 1997 (aged 29)	(Switzerland) ZSC Lions
63	G	Leonardo Genoni	1.83 m (6 ft 0 in)	86 kg (190 lb)	28 August 1987 (aged 38)	(Switzerland) EV Zug
71	D	Jonas Siegenthaler	1.88 m (6 ft 2 in)	99 kg (218 lb)	6 May 1997 (aged 28)	(United States) New Jersey Devils
73	F	Sandro Schmid	1.80 m (5 ft 11 in)	82 kg (181 lb)	3 June 2000 (aged 25)	(Switzerland) HC Fribourg-Gottéron
79	F	Calvin Thürkauf	1.88 m (6 ft 2 in)	97 kg (214 lb)	27 June 1997 (aged 28)	(Switzerland) HC Lugano
85	F	Sven Andrighetto	1.78 m (5 ft 10 in)	84 kg (185 lb)	21 March 1992 (aged 33)	(Switzerland) ZSC Lions
86	D	J.J. Moser	1.88 m (6 ft 2 in)	83 kg (183 lb)	6 June 2000 (aged 25)	(United States) Tampa Bay Lightning
88	F	Christoph Bertschy	1.78 m (5 ft 10 in)	84 kg (185 lb)	5 April 1994 (aged 31)	(Switzerland) HC Fribourg-Gottéron
90	D	Roman Josi – C	1.88 m (6 ft 2 in)	91 kg (201 lb)	1 June 1990 (aged 35)	(United States) Nashville Predators

==== Group play ====
Pos	Team	Pld	W	OTW	OTL	L	GF	GA	GD	Pts	Qualification
1	Canada	3	3	0	0	0	20	3	+17	9	Advance to quarterfinals
2	Switzerland	3	1	1	0	1	9	8	+1	5	Advance to qualification playoffs
3	Czechia	3	1	0	1	1	9	12	−3	4	Advance to qualification playoffs
4	France	3	0	0	0	3	5	20	−15	0	Advance to qualification playoffs

Source: IIHF
Rules for classification: Tiebreak criteria

12 February 2026; 12:10	Switzerland	4–0 (2–0, 0–0, 2–0)	France	PalaItalia, Milan; Attendance: 10,627

Game reference

Leonardo Genoni
Goalies
Antoine Keller
Referees:
(United States) Brian Pochmara
(Germany) André Schrader
Linesmen:
(United States) Jake Davis
(United States) Jonny Murray

Riat (Andrighetto, Kurashev) (PP) – 00:55	1–0
Moser (Fora) – 03:06	2–0
Meier (Josi, Kukan) – 50:08	3–0
Meier (Moser, Fiala) – 56:13	4–0

8 min
Penalties
10 min
43
Shots
27

13 February 2026; 21:10	Canada	5–1 (2–1, 1–0, 2–0)	Switzerland	PalaItalia, Milan; Attendance: 11,510

Game reference

Logan Thompson
Goalies
Akira Schmid
Referees:
(Czech Republic) Jan Hribik
(Canada) Dan O'Rourke
Linesmen:
(Denmark) Albert Ankerstjerne
(Canada) David Brisebois

McDavid (MacKinnon, Makar) (PP) – 05:45	1–0
Harley (McDavid, Wilson) – 10:54	2–0
	2–1	12:42 – Suter (Andrighetto, Kukan) (PP)
Celebrini (MacKinnon) (PP) – 24:14	3–1
Crosby (Marner, Makar) – 47:28	4–1
MacKinnon (McDavid, Celebrini) – 53:03	5–1

6 min
Penalties
6 min
39
Shots
25

15 February 2026; 12:10	Switzerland	4–3 OT (0–1, 2–0, 1–2) (OT: 1–0)	Czechia	PalaItalia, Milan; Attendance: 11,263

Game reference

Leonardo Genoni
Goalies
Lukáš Dostál
Referees:
(Canada) Michael Campbell
(United States) Chris Rooney
Linesmen:
(Finland) Onni Hautamäki
(Czech Republic) Libor Suchánek

	0–1	15:19 – Chlapík (Nečas, Kämpf)
Josi (Moser, Jäger) – 36:53	1–1
Meier (Josi, Hischier) (PP) – 38:37	2–1
	2–2	46:33 – Šimek (Chlapík, Nečas)
Suter (Moser, Meier) – 48:07	3–2
	3–3	57:54 – Nečas (Hronek, Pastrňák) (EA)
Kukan – 61:49	4–3

8 min
Penalties
6 min
29
Shots
32

Qualification play-offs

17 February 2026; 12:10	Switzerland	3–0 (2–0, 0–0, 1–0)	Italy	Fiera Milano, Milan; Attendance: 3,827

Game reference

Leonardo Genoni
Goalies
Damian Clara
Referees:
(Czech Republic) Jan Hribik
(Germany) André Schrader
Linesmen:
(Czech Republic) Libor Suchánek
(Canada) Tarrington Wyonzek

Kurashev (Hischier, Meier) – 01:19	1–0
Josi (Andrighetto, Hischier) (PP) – 10:25	2–0
Hischier (Riat, Meier) (PP) – 45:53	3–0

6 min
Penalties
12 min
51
Shots
20

Quarterfinals

18 February 2026; 18:10	Finland	3–2 OT (0–2, 0–0, 2–0) (OT: 1–0)	Switzerland	Fiera Milano, Milan; Attendance: 3,090

Game reference

Juuse Saros
Goalies
Leonardo Genoni
Referees:
(Canada) Michael Campbell
(Canada) Gord Dwyer
Linesmen:
(United States) Ryan Daisy
(Czech Republic) Libor Suchánek

	0–1	14:14 – Riat (Jäger)
	0–2	15:26 – Niederreiter (Suter, Kurashev)
Aho (Luostarinen, Lindell) – 53:54	1–2
Heiskanen (Hintz, Rantanen) (EA) – 58:48	2–2
Lehkonen (Lundell, Lindell) – 63:23	3–2

4 min
Penalties
4 min
31
Shots
23

=== Women's tournament ===
Switzerland women's national ice hockey team qualified a team of 23 players by finishing 5th in the 2024 IIHF World Ranking.

==== Roster ====
The roster was announced on 7 January 2026.

Head coach: Colin Muller

No.	Pos.	Name	Height	Weight	Birthdate	Team
2	D	Annic Büchi	1.69 m (5 ft 7 in)	67 kg (148 lb)	2 April 2005 (aged 20)	(Switzerland) EV Zug
7	F	Lara Stalder – C	1.67 m (5 ft 6 in)	63 kg (139 lb)	15 May 1994 (aged 31)	(Switzerland) EV Zug
8	F	Kaleigh Quennec – A	1.72 m (5 ft 8 in)	80 kg (180 lb)	15 February 1998 (aged 27)	(Switzerland) SC Bern
9	D	Shannon Sigrist	1.67 m (5 ft 6 in)	67 kg (148 lb)	20 April 1999 (aged 26)	(Switzerland) ZSC Lions
11	F	Laura Zimmermann	1.63 m (5 ft 4 in)	69 kg (152 lb)	5 April 2003 (aged 22)	(United States) St. Cloud State Huskies
12	F	Lisa Rüedi	1.67 m (5 ft 6 in)	67 kg (148 lb)	3 November 2000 (aged 25)	(Switzerland) ZSC Lions
13	F	Ivana Wey	1.72 m (5 ft 8 in)	67 kg (148 lb)	4 February 2006 (aged 20)	(Switzerland) EV Zug
15	D	Laure Mériguet	1.73 m (5 ft 8 in)	65 kg (143 lb)	15 August 2008 (aged 17)	(Switzerland) Genève-Servette HC U17
16	D	Nicole Vallario	1.66 m (5 ft 5 in)	66 kg (146 lb)	30 August 2001 (aged 24)	(United States) New York Sirens
17	D	Lara Christen	1.63 m (5 ft 4 in)	64 kg (141 lb)	2 October 2002 (aged 23)	(Switzerland) SC Bern
18	D	Stefanie Wetli	1.73 m (5 ft 8 in)	67 kg (148 lb)	4 February 2000 (aged 26)	(Switzerland) SC Bern
20	G	Andrea Brändli	1.67 m (5 ft 6 in)	76 kg (168 lb)	5 June 1997 (aged 28)	(Sweden) Frölunda HC
21	F	Rahel Enzler	1.63 m (5 ft 4 in)	66 kg (146 lb)	30 July 2000 (aged 25)	(Switzerland) EV Zug
22	F	Sinja Leemann	1.68 m (5 ft 6 in)	65 kg (143 lb)	19 April 2002 (aged 23)	(Switzerland) SC Bern
25	F	Alina Müller – A	1.67 m (5 ft 6 in)	65 kg (143 lb)	12 March 1998 (aged 27)	(United States) Boston Fleet
26	F	Naemi Herzig	1.70 m (5 ft 7 in)	68 kg (150 lb)	21 March 2007 (aged 18)	(United States) Holy Cross Crusaders
28	F	Alina Marti	1.67 m (5 ft 6 in)	66 kg (146 lb)	23 April 2004 (aged 21)	(Switzerland) EV Zug
29	G	Saskia Maurer	1.66 m (5 ft 5 in)	59 kg (130 lb)	29 July 2001 (aged 24)	(Switzerland) SC Bern
53	F	Vanessa Schaefer	1.63 m (5 ft 4 in)	63 kg (139 lb)	21 March 2005 (aged 20)	(Canada) UBC Thunderbirds
68	F	Leoni Balzer	1.65 m (5 ft 5 in)	60 kg (130 lb)	18 January 2006 (aged 20)	(Switzerland) HC Davos
70	G	Monja Wagner	1.64 m (5 ft 5 in)	62 kg (137 lb)	10 April 2003 (aged 22)	(United States) Union Garnet Chargers
71	F	Lena-Marie Lutz	1.68 m (5 ft 6 in)	68 kg (150 lb)	12 July 2001 (aged 24)	(Switzerland) HC Ambrì-Piotta
82	D	Alessia Baechler	1.74 m (5 ft 9 in)	72 kg (159 lb)	7 September 2005 (aged 20)	(United States) Northeastern Huskies

==== Group play ====
Pos	Team	Pld	W	OTW	OTL	L	GF	GA	GD	Pts	Qualification
1	United States	4	4	0	0	0	20	1	+19	12	Quarter-finals
2	Canada	4	3	0	0	1	14	6	+8	9	Quarter-finals
3	Czechia	4	1	0	1	2	7	14	−7	4	Quarter-finals
4	Finland	4	1	0	0	3	3	13	−10	3	Quarter-finals
5	Switzerland	4	0	1	0	3	5	15	−10	2	Quarter-finals

Source: IIHF

6 February 2026; 14:40 v	Czechia	3–4 GWS (2–1, 0–0, 1–2) (OT: 0–0) (SO: 0–1)	Switzerland	PalaItalia, Milan; Attendance: 8,927

Game reference

Michaela Hesová
Goalies
Saskia Maurer
Referees:
(Sweden) Ida Henriksson
(United States) Samantha Hiller
Linesmen:
(Canada) Alexandra Clarke
(Canada) Erin Zach

Kaltounková (Šapovalivová, Hymlárová) – 01:32	1–0
	1–1	07:16 – Zimmermann
Mlýnková (Mrázová) – 08:33	2–1
Plosová – 46:09	3–1
	3–2	49:33 – Müller (Wey, Stalder) (PP)
	3–3	57:40 – Christen (Enzler, Müller)

Mrázová
Mlýnková (miss)
Hymlárová
Kaltounková (miss)
Šapovalivová
Mrázová (miss)
Hymlárová (miss)
Šapovalivová (miss)
Shootout
Stalder
Müller
Wey
(miss) Marti
(miss) Herzig
(miss) Müller
(miss) Stalder
Wey
4 min
Penalties
2 min
36
Shots
31

7 February 2026; 21:10 v	Switzerland	0–4 (0–0, 0–1, 0–3)	Canada	Fiera Milano, Milan; Attendance: 3,885

Game reference

Saskia Maurer
Goalies
Emerance Maschmeyer
Referees:
(United States) Kelly Cooke
(Austria) Julia Kainberger
Linesmen:
(United States) Sarah Buckner
(Finland) Tiina Saarimäki

0–1	27:02 – Spooner (Poulin, Fillier) (PP)
0–2	44:03 – Fillier (Fast, Watts) (PP)
0–3	53:36 – Gosling (Ambrose, Thompson) (PP)
0–4	56:44 – Watts (Nurse, Thompson)

12 min
Penalties
4 min
6
Shots
55

9 February 2026; 20:40 v	Switzerland	0–5 (0–1, 0–1, 0–3)	United States	PalaItalia, Milan; Attendance: 11,132

Game reference

Andrea Brändli
Goalies
Gwyneth Philips
Referees:
(Austria) Julia Kainberger
(Canada) Shauna Neary
Linesmen:
(Canada) Laura Gutauskas
(Finland) Tiina Saarimäki

0–1	06:04 – Winn (Harvey, Knight)
0–2	34:08 – Dunne
0–3	41:17 – Bilka (Heise, Harvey)
0–4	46:34 – Carpenter (Knight, Dunne)
0–5	47:42 – Harvey (Carpenter, Dunne)

2 min
Penalties
4 min
21
Shots
50

10 February 2026; 21:10 v	Finland	3–1 (0–0, 3–1, 0–0)	Switzerland	Fiera Milano, Milan; Attendance: 3,790

Game reference

Sanni Ahola
Goalies
Saskia Maurer
Referees:
(United States) Samantha Hiller
(Canada) Elizabeth Mantha
Linesmen:
(Canada) Justine Todd
(Canada) Kirsten Welsh

Vainikka (Vanhanen, Nieminen) (PP) – 23:33	1–0
Liikala (Nylund, Vesa) – 29:50	2–0
	2–1	37:00 – Müller (SH)
Vanhanen (Karvinen, Schalin) (PP) – 37:35	3–1

2 min
Penalties
10 min
31
Shots
15

Quarterfinals

14 February 2026; 21:10 v	Finland	0–1 (0–0, 0–1, 0–0)	Switzerland	Fiera Milano, Milan; Attendance: 3,686

Game reference
Sanni Ahola	Goalies	Andrea Brändli	Referees: (United States) Samantha Hiller (Canada) Elizabeth Mantha; Linesmen: (Canada) Alexandra Clarke (Canada) Laura Gutauskas
0–1 / 34:17 – Müller (Enzler, Stalder)			Referees: (United States) Samantha Hiller (Canada) Elizabeth Mantha; Linesmen: (Canada) Alexandra Clarke (Canada) Laura Gutauskas
6 min	Penalties	6 min	Referees: (United States) Samantha Hiller (Canada) Elizabeth Mantha; Linesmen: (Canada) Alexandra Clarke (Canada) Laura Gutauskas
40	Shots	14	Referees: (United States) Samantha Hiller (Canada) Elizabeth Mantha; Linesmen: (Canada) Alexandra Clarke (Canada) Laura Gutauskas

Semifinals

16 February 2026; 21:10 v	Canada	2–1 (0–0, 2–0, 0–1)	Switzerland	PalaItalia, Milan; Attendance: 9,662

Game reference

Ann-Renée Desbiens
Goalies
Andrea Brändli
Referees:
(United States) Kelly Cooke
(United States) Melissa Doyle
Linesmen:
(United States) Sarah Buckner
(Czech Republic) Kristýna Hájková

Poulin (Jaques, Watts) – 21:49	1–0
Poulin (Watts, Shelton) – 28:21	2–0
	2–1	44:53 – Enzler (Müller)

6 min
Penalties
4 min
46
Shots
8

Bronze medal game

19 February 2026; 14:40 v	Switzerland	2–1 OT (0–0, 1–1, 0–0) (OT: 1–0)	Sweden	PalaItalia, Milan; Attendance: 8,243

Game reference

Andrea Brändli
Goalies
Ebba Svensson Träff
Referees:
(Canada) Élizabeth Mantha
(Finland) Anniina Nurmi
Linesmen:
(Canada) Alexandra Clarke
(Canada) Justine Todd

	0–1	31:40 – Jungåker (Svensson, T. Johansson)
Leemann (Marti) – 35:40	1–1
Müller (Wey, Christen) – 69:09	2–1

2 min
Penalties
4 min
25
Shots
33

== Luge ==
Athlete	Event	Run 1		Run 2		Run 3		Run 4		Total	
Athlete	Event	Time	Rank	Time	Rank	Time	Rank	Time	Rank	Time	Rank
Natalie Maag	Women singles	53.051	10	53.148	12	53.169	11	53.039	9	3:32.407	9

== Skeleton ==
Athlete	Event	Heat 1		Heat 2		Heat 3		Heat 4		Total	
Athlete	Event	Time	Rank	Time	Rank	Time	Rank	Time	Rank	Time	Rank
Vinzenz Buff	Men's	57.27	16	57.02	16	56.80	15	56.87	16	3:47.96	15

== Ski jumping ==
=== Men ===
Athlete	Event	First round			Second round			Final round			Total	
Athlete	Event	Distance	Points	Rank	Distance	Points	Rank	Distance	Points	Rank	Points	Rank
Gregor Deschwanden	Normal hill	106.0	132.8	4 Q	—N/a			107.0	133.2	5	266.0	3rd place, bronze medalist(s)
Sandro Hauswirth	Normal hill	100.0	124.8	20 Q	—N/a			98.5	120.8	29	245.6	29
Felix Trunz	Normal hill	101.5	124.0	25 Q	—N/a			100.0	129.6	12	253.6	18
Gregor Deschwanden	Large hill	129.5	133.1	14 Q	—N/a			131.0	133.4	13	266.5	13
Sandro Hauswirth	Large hill	127.0	126.9	20 Q	—N/a			124.0	107.8	29	234.7	28
Felix Trunz	Large hill	127.0	114.2	38	—N/a			DNA				
Felix Trunz; Gregor Deschwanden	Large hill super team	265.0	267.5	7 Q	251.5	254.6	8 Q	Cancelled			552.1	7

=== Women ===
Athlete	Event	First round			Final round			Total	
Athlete	Event	Distance	Points	Rank	Distance	Points	Rank	Points	Rank
Sina Arnet	Normal hill	94.0	113.6	23 Q	94.0	101.7	28	215.3	28
Sina Arnet	Large hill	117.5	93.6	33	DNA				

== Ski mountaineering ==
Switzerland qualified two female and two male ski mountaineer through the 2025 ISMF World Championships.

Men

Athlete	Event	Heat		Semifinal		Final	
Athlete	Event	Time	Rank	Time	Rank	Time	Rank
Jon Kistler	Men's sprint	02:38.36	1 Q	02:34.93	1 FA	02:57.87	6
Arno Lietha	Men's sprint	02:43.23	1 Q	02:33.79	1 FA	02:39.07	4

Women

Athlete	Event	Heat		Semifinal		Final	
Athlete	Event	Time	Rank	Time	Rank	Time	Rank
Marianne Fatton	Women's sprint	03:06.51	1 Q	03:08.29	2 FA	02:59.77	1st place, gold medalist(s)
Caroline Ulrich	Women's sprint	3:11.43	3 Q	03:14.71	4	DNA	

Mixed

Athlete	Event	Final	
Athlete	Event	Time	Rank
Marianne Fatton; Jon Kistler	Mixed relay	27:09.30	2nd place, silver medalist(s)

Qualification legend: Q - Qualify to next round; FA - Qualify to medal final; FB - Qualify to consolation final

== Snowboarding ==
=== Freestyle ===
==== Men ====
Athlete	Event	Qualification					Final				
Athlete	Event	Run 1	Run 2	Run 3	Total	Rank	Run 1	Run 2	Run 3	Best	Rank
Jonas Hasler	Big air	70.75	68.50	DNI	139.25	24	DNA				
Jonas Hasler	Halfpipe	66.75	67.75	—N/a	67.75	16	DNA				
Jan Scherrer	Halfpipe	DNS		—N/a	DNS		DNA				
David Habluetzel	Halfpipe	64.25	DNI	—N/a	64.25	17	DNA				
Mischa Zürcher	Halfpipe	13.25	DNI	—N/a	13.25	22	DNA				
Jonas Hasler	Slopestyle	55.90	53.83	—N/a	55.90	19	DNA				

==== Women ====
Athlete	Event	Qualification					Final				
Athlete	Event	Run 1	Run 2	Run 3	Total	Rank	Run 1	Run 2	Run 3	Best	Rank
Ariane Burri	Big air	76.25	13.00	66.50	142.75	19	DNA				
Isabelle Lötscher	Halfpipe	48.50	DNI	—N/a	48.50	16	DNA				
Ariane Burri	Slopestyle	58.75	47.25	—N/a	58.75	14	DNA				

=== Parallel ===
==== Men ====
Athlete	Event	Qualification		Round of 16	Quarterfinal	Semifinal	Final	
Athlete	Event	Time	Rank	Opposition Time	Opposition Time	Opposition Time	Opposition Time	Rank
Dario Caviezel	Giant slalom	1:26.85	7 Q	Felicetti (ITA); L +0.21	DNA			
Gian Casanova	Giant slalom	1:28.06	22	DNA				

==== Women ====
Athlete	Event	Qualification		Round of 16	Quarterfinal	Semifinal	Final	
Athlete	Event	Time	Rank	Opposition Time	Opposition Time	Opposition Time	Opposition Time	Rank
Julie Zogg	Giant slalom	1:34.36	11 Q	Caffont (ITA); L +0.47	DNA			
Ladina Caviezel	Giant slalom	1:37.58	23	DNA				
Flurina Neva Bätschi	Giant slalom	1:35.68	18	DNA				
Xenia von Siebenthal	Giant slalom	1:35.86	19	DNA				

=== Snowboard cross ===
==== Men ====
Athlete	Event	Seeding run 1		1/8 final	Quarterfinal	Semifinal	Final	
Athlete	Event	Time	Rank	Position	Position	Position	Position	Rank
Kalle Koblet	Snowboard cross	1:09.40	15	2 Q	4	DNA		

==== Women ====
Athlete	Event	Seeding				Round of 16	Quarterfinal	Semifinal	Final	
Athlete	Event	Run 1	Run 2	Rank	Best	Position	Position	Position	Position	Rank
Aline Albrecht	Snowboard cross	1:15.80	X	19	1:15.80	3	DNA			
Anouk Dörig	Snowboard cross	1:35.49	1:14.87	22	1:14.87	4	DNA			
Sina Siegenthaler	Snowboard cross	1:14.22	X	3	1:14.22	2 Q	3	DNA		
Noémie Wiedmer	Snowboard cross	1:13.12	X	8	1:13.12	1 Q	2	2 FA	4	4

==== Mixed ====
Athlete	Event	Quarterfinal	Semifinal	Final	
Athlete	Event	Position	Position	Position	Rank
Kalle Koblet; Noémie Wiedmer	Team snowboard cross	2 Q	4 FB	2	6

Qualification legend: Q - Qualify to next round; FA - Qualify to medal final; FB - Qualify to consolation final

== Speed skating ==
Switzerland received quotas for six speed skaters (one man and five women) through performances at the 2025-26 ISU Speed Skating World Cup. Swiss Olympic selected three athletes (one man and two women).

=== Men ===
Athlete	Event	Semifinal		Final	
Athlete	Event	Time	Rank	Time	Rank
Livio Wenger	1500 m	—N/a		1:47.80	28
Livio Wenger	Mass start	7:52.74	10	DNA	

=== Women ===
Athlete	Event	Semifinal		Final	
Athlete	Event	Time	Rank	Time	Rank
Kaitlyn McGregor	1000 m	—N/a		1:16.16	17
Kaitlyn McGregor	1500 m	—N/a		1:55.39	11
Kaitlyn McGregor	3000 m	—N/a		4:04.97	11
Ramona Hardi	Mass start	8:44.52	5 Q	8:53.52	11
Kaitlyn McGregor	Mass start	8:40.11	6 Q	8:47.96	6

== See also ==
- Switzerland at the 2026 Winter Paralympics
