= Bobsleigh at the 2026 Winter Olympics – Four-man =

Bobsleigh four-man at the XXV Olympic Winter Games
- Bobsleigh
- Venue: Cortina Sliding Centre; Cortina d'Ampezzo
- Date: 21, 22 February 2026
- Competitors: 109 from 18 nations
- Teams: 27
- Winning time: 3:37.57

Medalists
1st place, gold medalist(s)		Johannes Lochner; Thorsten Margis; Jörn Wenzel; Georg Fleischhauer	Germany
2nd place, silver medalist(s)		Francesco Friedrich; Matthias Sommer; Alexander Schüller; Felix Straub	Germany
3rd place, bronze medalist(s)		Michael Vogt; Andreas Haas; Amadou David Ndiaye; Mario Aeberhard	Switzerland

The four-man competition in bobsleigh at the 2026 Winter Olympics was held on 21 February (heats 1 and 2) and 22 February (heats 3 and 4), at the Cortina Sliding Centre in Cortina d'Ampezzo. Germany, represented by Johannes Lochner, Thorsten Margis, Jörn Wenzel, and Georg Fleischhauer, won the event. Their teammates, driven by Francesco Friedrich, won the silver medal, and the Swiss crew, driven by Michael Vogt, won bronze. For Vogt and his crew, these were the first Olympic medals.

Israel's first-ever bobsleigh team to compete at a Winter Olympics, was disqualified after the Israeli Olympic Committee withdrew the team. One athlete had claimed to be ill, a claim supported by a medical check and signed affidavit, to allow a substitute to complete in his place. It was later revealed that the athlete had falsely claimed to be sick. As substitutions are only permitted for legitimate illness or injury under Olympic rules, the Israeli Olympic Committee barred the team from competing further.

== Background ==
The defending champions were Francesco Friedrich, Thorsten Margis, Arndt Bauer and Alexander Schüller. Friedrich and Schüller qualified for the event, but in 2026 they were joined by Matthias Sommer and Felix Straub. If they won, Friedrich would become the first person to win three gold medals in four-man bobsleigh and could become the first person to win both the two and four-man competitions in three consecutive Winter Olympics. Margis also qualified for the event, but moved to the four-man crew of Johannes Lochner – the 2022 silver medalist alongside Florian Bauer, Christopher Weber and Christian Rasp; for 2026 Lochner and Margis were joined by Georg Fleischhauer and Jörn Wenzel. The bronze medalists were Justin Kripps, Ryan Sommer, Cam Stones and Ben Coakwell. Kripps retired from competitions. Lochner won the 2025–26 Bobsleigh World Cup, having won three out of seven four-man races that season; further three were won by Friedrich. The quartet of Friedrich, Schüller, Sommer and Straub were the 2025 World champions.

== Qualification ==
=== Summary ===
Sleds qualified	Countries	Athletes total	Nation
3	2	24	Germany; Switzerland
2	5	40	United States; Canada; South Korea; China; Austria
1	11	44	Brazil; France; Great Britain; Israel; Italy; Jamaica; Latvia; Liechtenstein; Netherlands; Romania; Trinidad and Tobago
27	18	108	

== Results ==
Rank	Bib	Athletes	Country	Run 1	Rank	Run 2	Rank	Run 3	Rank	Run 4	Rank	Total	Behind
1st place, gold medalist(s)	1	Johannes Lochner; Thorsten Margis; Jörn Wenzel; Georg Fleischhauer	Germany	53.91 TR	1	54.70	2	54.25	1	54.71	1	3:37.57	
2nd place, silver medalist(s)	2	Francesco Friedrich; Matthias Sommer; Alexander Schüller; Felix Straub	Germany	54.30	2	54.74	3	54.30	2	54.80	3	3:38.14	+0.57
3rd place, bronze medalist(s)	7	Michael Vogt; Andreas Haas; Amadou David Ndiaye; Mario Aeberhard	Switzerland	54.53	6	54.79	4	54.55	3	54.77	2	3:38.64	+1.07
4	3	Adam Ammour; Issam Ammour; Joshua Tasche; Alexander Schaller	Germany	54.51	5	54.69	1	54.58	5	54.90	4	3:38.68	+1.11
5	6	Patrick Baumgartner; Lorenzo Bilotti; Eric Fantazzini; Robert Mircea	Italy	54.55	7	54.84	5	54.57	4	54.93	6	3:38.89	+1.32
6	8	Cédric Follador; Luca Rolli; Tim Annen; Omar Vögele	Switzerland	54.49	4	54.91	8	54.69	7	54.94	7	3:39.03	+1.46
7	4	Brad Hall; Greg Cackett; Leon Greenwood; Taylor Lawrence	Great Britain	54.39	3	55.04	12	54.66	6	55.03	10	3:39.12	+1.55
8	9	Kim Jin-su; Kim Hyeong-geun; Lee Geon-u; Kim Sun-wook	South Korea	54.60	8	54.90	6	54.75	9	54.99	8	3:39.24	+1.67
9	5	Markus Treichl; Markus Sammer; Sascha Stepan; Kristian Huber	Austria	54.80	12	54.90	6	54.70	8	54.90	4	3:39.30	+1.73
10	13	Jēkabs Kalenda; Lauris Kaufmanis; Matīss Miknis; Mairis Kļava	Latvia	54.64	10	55.23	17	54.85	10	55.00	9	3:39.72	+2.15
11	11	Kristopher Horn; Caleb Furnell; Hunter Powell; Carsten Vissering	United States	54.60	8	55.01	11	55.22	17	55.11	14	3:39.94	+2.37
12	27	Frank Del Duca; Boone Niederhofer; Bryan Sosoo; Joshua Williamson	United States	55.03	14	54.99	9	54.97	12	55.07	13	3:40.06	+2.49
13	18	Dave Wesselink; Janko Franjić; Jelen Franjić; Timme Koster	Netherlands	55.09	20	55.00	10	55.15	16	55.04	11	3:40.28	+2.71
14	10	Taylor Austin; Keaton Bruggeling; Mike Evelyn; Shaquille Murray-Lawrence	Canada	54.72	11	55.42	22	55.11	15	55.04	11	3:40.29	+2.72
15	15	Timo Rohner; Pascal Moser; Mathieu Hersperger; Cyril Bieri	Switzerland	54.99	13	55.16	14	54.92	11	55.26	18	3:40.33	+2.76
16	25	Sun Kaizhi; Zhang Jin; Shi Yaolong; An Tai	China	55.05	16	55.21	15	54.97	12	55.13	15	3:40.36	+2.79
17	24	Mihai Tentea; Mihai Păcioianu; Andrei Nica (Run 4); Constantin Dinescu; George Iordache (Run 1–3)	Romania	55.05	16	55.12	13	55.05	14	55.21	16	3:40.43	+2.86
18	22	Li Chunjian; Jiang Maoyuan; Ye Jielong; Ding Yunda	China	55.07	18	55.36	20	55.22	17	55.22	17	3:40.87	+3.30
19	17	Edson Bindilatti; Davidson de Souza; Rafael Souza da Silva; Luís Bacca	Brazil	55.04	15	55.42	22	55.38	19	55.30	20	3:41.14	+3.57
20	14	Jay Dearborn; Yohan Eskrick-Parkinson; Luka Stoikos; Mark Zanette	Canada	55.18	22	55.27	18	55.42	20	55.29	19	3:41.16	+3.59
21	16	Martin Kranz; Mauro Bühler; Lorenz Lenherr; David Tschofen	Liechtenstein	55.08	19	55.38	21	55.56	22	Did not advance		2:46.02	—
21	19	Shane Pitter; Junior Harris; Tyquendo Tracey; Joel Fearon	Jamaica	55.28	23	55.29	19	55.45	21	Did not advance		2:46.02	—
23	20	Suk Young-jin; Chae Byung-do; Chun Su-hyun; Lee Do-yun	South Korea	55.51	24	55.22	16	55.72	23	Did not advance		2:46.45	—
	21	Adam Edelman; Menachem Chen; Uri Zisman; Omer Katz	Israel	55.53	25	55.63	24	Did not start					
	12	Romain Heinrich; Dorian Hauterville; Nils Blairon; Antoine Riou	France	55.59	26	Did not finish							
	23	Axel Brown; De Aundre John; Shakeel John; Xaverri Williams	Trinidad and Tobago	55.72	27	Did not finish							
	26	Jakob Mandlbauer; Daniel Bertschler; Sebastian Mitterer; Daiyehan Nichols-Bardi	Austria	55.14	21	Did not finish							
