= Shi Yaolong =

Chinese bobsledder (born 2006)

Personal information
- Nationality: Chinese
- Born: 4 August 2006 (age 20)

Sport
- Country: China
- Sport: Bobsleigh
- Events: Two-man, Four-man

Shi Yaolong (Chinese: 石曜隆; born 4 August 2006) is a Chinese bobsledder. He represented China at the 2026 Winter Olympics in four-man pushing for the team of Sun Kaizhi. The team finished 16th. He also competed at other international competitions, including at the IBSF World Championships 2025.

== Bobsleigh results ==
All results are sourced from the International Bobsleigh and Skeleton Federation (IBSF).

=== Olympic Games ===
Event	Four-man
(Italy) 2026 Milano Cortina	16th

=== World Championships ===
Event	Four-man
(United States) 2025 Lake Placid	DNF
