= Mairis Kļava =

Latvian bobsledder (born 1999)

Personal information
- Born: 16 July 1999 (age 27) Alūksne, Latvia
- Height: 178 cm (5 ft 10 in)
- Weight: 91 kg (201 lb)

Sport
- Country: Latvia
- Sport: Bobsleigh
- Events: Two-man, Four-man
Medal record
Men's bobsleigh
Representing Latvia
Junior European Championships
Silver medal – second place	2025 Sigulda	Two-man

Mairis Kļava (born 16 July 1999) is a Latvian bobsledder. He represented Latvia at the 2026 Winter Olympics.

== Career ==
Kļava began bobsleigh in 2022, pushing for the team of Jēkabs Kalenda in the Bobsleigh European Cup. He made his debut in Bobsleigh World Cup competition in 2023 at the Yanqing course in China. In 2025, Kļava earned a silver medal in two-man at the Junior European Championships pushing for Renārs Grantiņš. In 2026, Kļava was selected to represent Latvia at the Winter Olympics in four-man, pushing for the team of Jēkabs Kalenda. The team finished 10th in the competition.

== Personal life ==
Kļava holds a bachelor's degree in business administration from the University of Latvia.

== Bobsleigh results ==
All results are sourced from the International Bobsleigh and Skeleton Federation (IBSF).

=== Olympic Games ===
Event	Four-man
(Italy) 2026 Milano Cortina	10th

=== World Championships ===
Event	Four-man
(Germany) 2024 Winterberg	DNF
(United States) 2025 Lake Placid	15th
