= Hunter Powell =

American Athlete and bobsledder (born 1996)

Personal information
- Born: March 15, 1999 (age 27) Fort Collins, Colorado, U.S.
- Height: 6 ft 3 in (191 cm)

Sport
- Country: United States
- Sport: Bobsleigh
- Events: Two-man, Four-man

Hunter Powell (born March 15, 1999) is an American athlete and bobsledder. He represented the United States in bobsleigh at the 2026 Winter Olympics.

== Career ==
=== Track and field ===
Powell began his career as a track and field athlete, participating heptathlon and decathlon. He joined the track and field team of Colorado State University, and in 2019 won the Mountain West Conference championships for indoor heptathlon and outdoor decathlon. He qualified for the NCAA Division I Men's Outdoor Track and Field Championships based on these results, but was forced to withdraw with a broken ankle.

=== Bobsled ===
While at Colorado State, Powell began a romantic relationship with Kaysha Love, whom he had met at Mountain West Conference track meets. Love joined the United States national bobsled team, and later convinced Powell to try out for bobsleigh at a combine event in Utah. After the combine, he was invited back for a bobsleigh rookie camp, and shortly thereafter also became of the US bobsleigh team. He began competing in the Bobsleigh World Cup and North America Cup pushing for the team of Kristopher Horn. The team qualified for the 2026 Winter Olympics, with Powell part of the four-man team. They finished 11th in the event, the better placed of the two American sleds entered in four-man.

== Personal life ==
Powell is a native of Fort Collins, Colorado. He is engaged to fellow USA bobsledder Kaysha Love.

== Bobsled results ==
=== Olympic Games ===
Event	Four-man
(Italy) 2026 Milano Cortina	11th

=== World Championships ===
Event	Two-man	Four-man
(United States) 2025 Lake Placid	9th	7th
