= Kim Hyeong-geun =

South Korean bobsledder (born 1999)

Personal information
- Nationality: South Korean
- Born: 7 April 1999 (age 27)

Sport
- Country: South Korea
- Sport: Bobsleigh
- Events: Two-man, Four-man

Kim Hyeong-guen (Korean: 김형근; born 7 April 1999) is a South Korean bobsledder. He represented South Korea at the 2022 and 2026 Winter Olympics. At the 2022 Olympics, he was a push athlete for the team of Suk Young-jin. The team finished 24th in two-man and 25th in four-man. At the 2026 Olympics he was with the team of Kim Jin-su. This team finished 13th in two-man, and 8th in four-man.

Kim has earned two medals in Bobsleigh World Cup competition. He earned a bronze in two-man at Altenberg in 2024, and a bronze in four-man at Cortina in 2025, in both races with Kim Jin-su piloting.

== Bobsleigh results ==
=== Olympic Games ===
Event	Two-man	Four-man
(China) 2022 Beijing	24th	25th
(Italy) 2026 Milano Cortina	13th	8th

=== World Championships ===
Event	Two-man	Four-man
(United States) 2025 Lake Placid	7th	9th
