= Jörn Wenzel =

German bobsledder (born 2004)

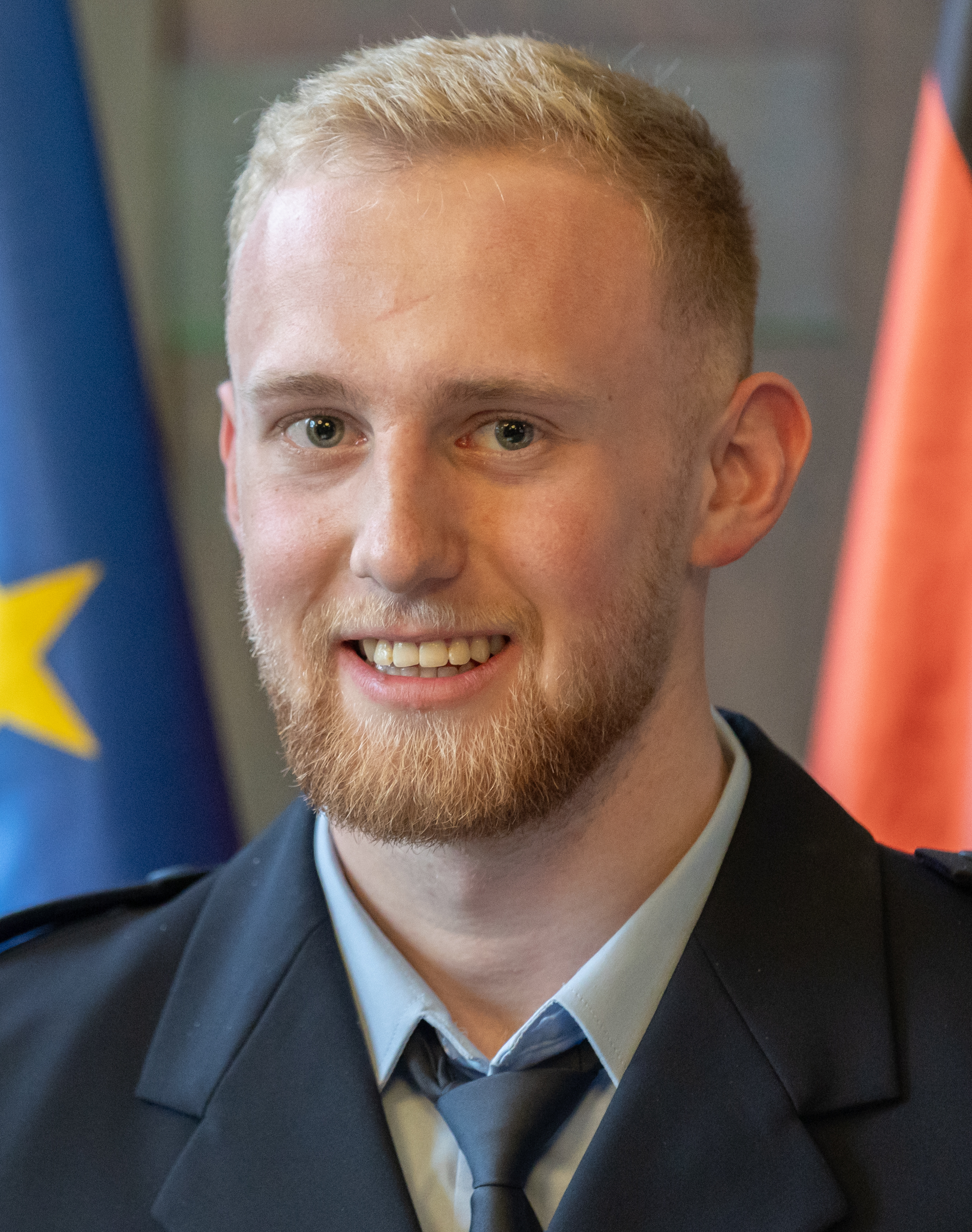
- Wenzel in 2026

Personal information
- Born: 13 August 2004 (age 21)
- Height: 1.81 m (5 ft 11 in)
- Weight: 75 kg (165 lb)

Sport
- Country: Germany
- Sport: Bobsleigh
- Event: Four-man
- Coached by: René Spies
Medal record
Men's bobsleigh
Representing Germany
Olympic Games
Gold medal – first place	2026 Milano Cortina	Four-man
World Championships
Silver medal – second place	2025 Lake Placid	Four-man
European Championships
Gold medal – first place	2025 Lillehammer	Four-man
Silver medal – second place	2026 St. Moritz	Four-man

Jörn Wenzel (born 13 August 2004) is a German bobsledder. He represented Germany at the 2026 Winter Olympics.

== Career ==
In February 2025, he competed at the IBSF European Championships 2025 and won a gold medal in the four-man event. The next month, he competed at the IBSF World Championships 2025 and won a silver medal in the four-man event.

== World Championships results ==
Event	Two-man	Four-man
(United States) 2025 Lake Placid		2nd
