= Caleb Furnell =

American bobsledder

Personal information
- Born: April 20, 2001 (age 25) Kansas, U.S.
- Home town: Lee's Summit, Missouri, U.S.
- Education: Utah Valley University
- Height: 6 ft 2 in (188 cm)

Sport
- Country: United States
- Sport: Bobsled, Athletics

Caleb Furnell (born April 20, 2001) is an American bobsledder and former track and field sprinter. He represents the United States as a push athlete in international bobsled competition and qualified for the 2026 Winter Olympics.

== Early life and education ==
Furnell was born in Manhattan, Kansas and attended high school in Lee's Summit, Missouri. He participated in soccer and track and field during his youth and set a state high-jump record in high school.

He later attended Utah Valley University, where he competed in sprint events for the track and field team from 2019 to 2024.

== Track and field career ==
At Utah Valley, Furnell specialized in the 100- and 200-metre sprints. He earned first-team All-Western Athletic Conference (WAC) honors in both events and was part of the WAC-champion 4×100-metre relay team in 2024, which qualified for the NCAA Regionals.

He recorded personal bests including 10.30 seconds in the 100 metres and 20.77 seconds in the 200 metres.

Furnell also ranked among the top performers in several Utah Valley indoor record lists, including the 200 metres and 300 metres.

== Bobsled career ==
After graduating, Furnell was encouraged by a friend to attend a bobsled combine. He subsequently earned a place on the U.S. national team and quickly progressed to international competition.

He began competing in bobsled in 2025 and was selected as a push athlete for the United States four-man team piloted by Kristopher Horn.

Furnell qualified for the 2026 Winter Olympics, marking his Olympic debut.

== Personal life ==
Furnell is married to Brynlee Furnell. Outside sport, he has noted an interest in motorsport and named pets after racing figures.
