= Lee Geon-u =

South Korean bobsledder (born 2000)

Personal information
- Nationality: South Korean
- Born: 23 May 2000 (age 26) Seoul, South Korea
- Height: 182 cm (6 ft 0 in)
- Weight: 87 kg (192 lb)

Sport
- Country: South Korea
- Sport: Bobsleigh
- Events: Two-man, Four-man

Lee Geon-u (Korean: 이건우; born 23 May 2000) is a South Korean bobsledder. He represented South Korea at the 2026 Winter Olympics. Lee has earned one Bobsleigh World Cup medal in four-man competition with a bronze at Cortina in 2025 pushing for Kim Jin-su, marking the first World Cup podium for a Korean sled. Lee pushed for Kim's four man team at the 2026 Olympics, where the team placed eighth.

== Bobsleigh results ==
All results are sourced from the International Bobsleigh and Skeleton Federation (IBSF).

=== Olympic Games ===
Event	Four-man
(Italy) 2026 Milano Cortina	8th

=== World Championships ===
Event	Four-man
(United States) 2025 Lake Placid	9th
