= An Tai =

Chinese bobsledder (born 2001)

Personal information
- Nationality: Chinese
- Born: 11 January 2001 (age 25)

Sport
- Country: China
- Sport: Bobsleigh
- Events: Two-man, Four-man

An Tai (Chinese: 安泰; born 11 January 2001) is a Chinese bobsledder. He represented China at the 2026 Winter Olympics in two-man and four-man. He finished 16th in both events pushing for the team of Sun Kaizhi. An has competed in bobsleigh since 2024, and has been a regular competitor in the Bobsleigh World Cup since.

== Bobsleigh results ==
=== Olympic Games ===
Event	Two-man	Four-man
(Italy) 2026 Milano Cortina	16th	16th

=== World Championships ===
Event	Two-man	Four-man
(United States) 2025 Lake Placid	—	DNF
