= Tim Annen =

Swiss bobsledder (born 2004)

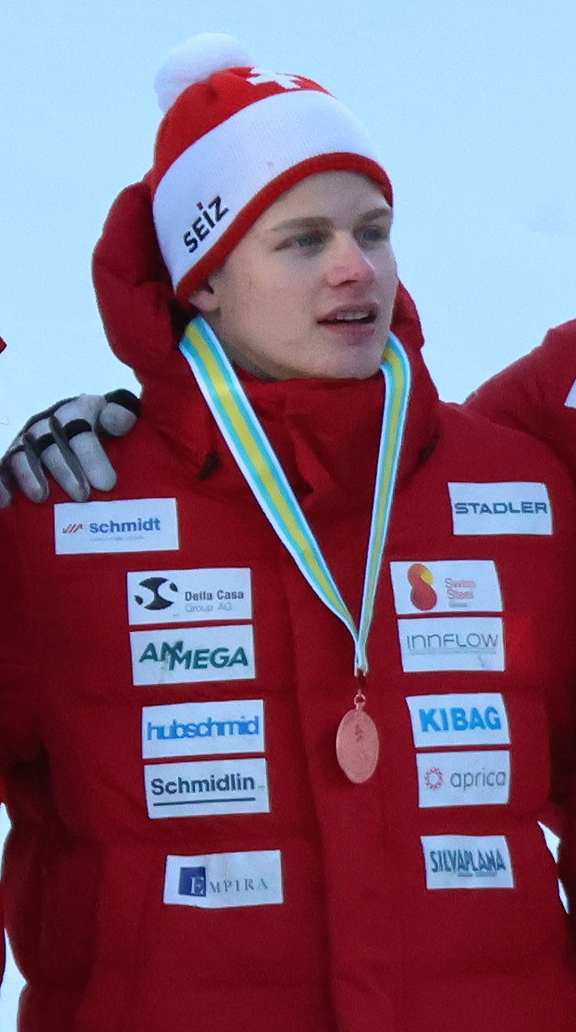
- Annen at a World Cup event at St. Moritz in 2025

Personal information
- Nationality: Swiss
- Born: 13 July 2004 (age 22)

Sport
- Country: Switzerland
- Sport: Bobsleigh
- Events: Two-man, Four-man

Tim Annen (born 13 July 2004) is a Swiss bobsledder, who currently participates as a brakeman. He competed at the 2026 Winter Olympics in two-man and four-man. He is the son of Martin Annen, who won three Olympic bronze medals in bobsleigh. His sister, Debora Annen, is also a bobsledder who was also at the 2026 Winter games.

== Career ==
Annen began competing in bobsleigh in 2021. In 2023 Annen finished 4th in the Junior European Championships. He made his World Cup debut in 2024 at Sigulda as a pushman for Timo Rohner. At the event at St. Moritz in 2025, he finished 6th in four-man as part of Rohner's team, marking his best result.

In 2026, Annen was selected to represent Switzerland at the Winter Olympics. He was paired with Timo Rohner for the two-man, but was with pilot Cédric Follador for the four-man.

== Personal life ==
Annen is a trained electrician. He also helps work at his father's event bar in Oberarth. He lives in Arth.

== Bobsleigh results ==
All results are sourced from the International Bobsleigh and Skeleton Federation (IBSF).

=== Olympic Games ===
Event	Two-man	Four-man
(Italy) 2026 Milano Cortina	15th	6th

=== World Championships ===
Event	Two-man	Four-man
(United States) 2025 Lake Placid	—	10th
