= Pascal Moser =

Swiss bobsledder (born 1996)

Personal information
- Nationality: Swiss
- Born: 23 November 1996 (age 29) Zäziwil, Bern, Switzerland

Sport
- Country: Switzerland
- Sport: Bobsleigh
- Events: Two-man, Four-man
Medal record
Men's bobsleigh
Representing Switzerland
Junior European Championships
Silver medal – second place	2022 Winterberg	Four-man

Pascal Moser (born 23 November 1996) is a Swiss bobsledder.

He represented Switzerland at the 2026 Winter Olympics in four-man, pushing for the team of Timo Rohner. The team finished 15th. Moser has earned one medal in Bobsleigh World Cup competition, a bronze in four-man at Altenberg pushing for Simon Friedli in 2024 during the 2023–24 Bobsleigh World Cup.

== Bobsleigh results ==
All results are sourced from the International Bobsleigh and Skeleton Federation (IBSF).

=== Olympic Games ===
Event	Four-man
(Italy) 2026 Milano Cortina	15th
