= Debora Annen =

Swiss bobsledder (born 2002)

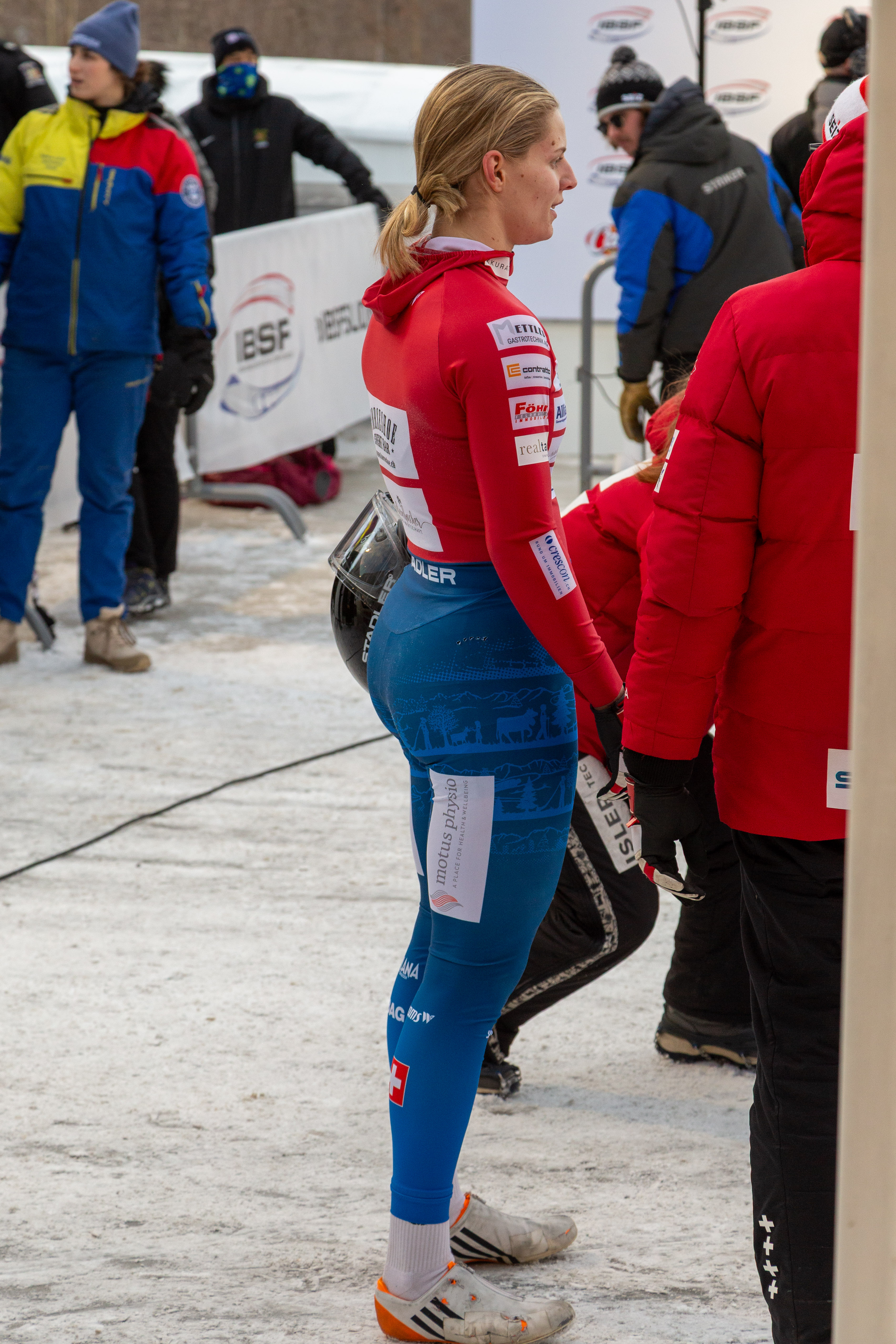
- Annen at the IBSF World Championships 2025

Personal information
- Nationality: Swiss
- Born: 1 April 2002 (age 24)

Sport
- Country: Switzerland
- Sport: Bobsleigh
- Events: Monobob, Two-woman
Medal record
Women's bobsleigh
Representing Switzerland
Junior World Championships
Gold medal – first place	2024 St. Moritz	Monobob
Gold medal – first place	2026 St. Moritz	Monobob
Silver medal – second place	2025 Altenberg	Monobob
Silver medal – second place	2025 Altenberg	Two-woman
Silver medal – second place	2026 St. Moritz	Two-woman
Bronze medal – third place	2024 St. Moritz	Two-woman
Junior European Championships
Bronze medal – third place	2024 Innsbruck	Two-woman
Bronze medal – third place	2025 Winterberg	Two-woman

Debora Annen (born 1 April 2002) is a Swiss bobsledder. She represented Switzerland at the 2026 Winter Olympics. She is the daughter of Martin Annen, a three-time Olympic bronze medalist in bobsleigh. Her brother Tim Annen is also a bobsledder, who was also at the 2026 Olympic games. She lives in Arth.

== Career ==
Prior to bobsled, Annen participated in handball, and was part of the LK Zug handball team as well as Switzerland's national junior team. However, she was forced to end her handball career at age 18 due to a cartilage growth on her throwing arm that caused excessive pain, despite multiple operations to try to correct.

Annen moved to bobsleigh shortly after the end of her handball career, with her father, Martin, acting as her coach. She began competing in international events in the 2023–24 season and began to find success quickly at the junior level. At the 2024 Junior World Championships, she won the gold medal in monobob and a bronze medal in two-woman. She also began competing in World Cup events in 2024. In 2026, Annen earned another gold medal in monobob in the Junior World Championships.

Annen was selected to represent Switzerland at the 2026 Winter Olympics in both monobob and two-woman. She finished 11th in the monobob event and tied for seventh in the two-woman event.

== Bobsleigh results ==
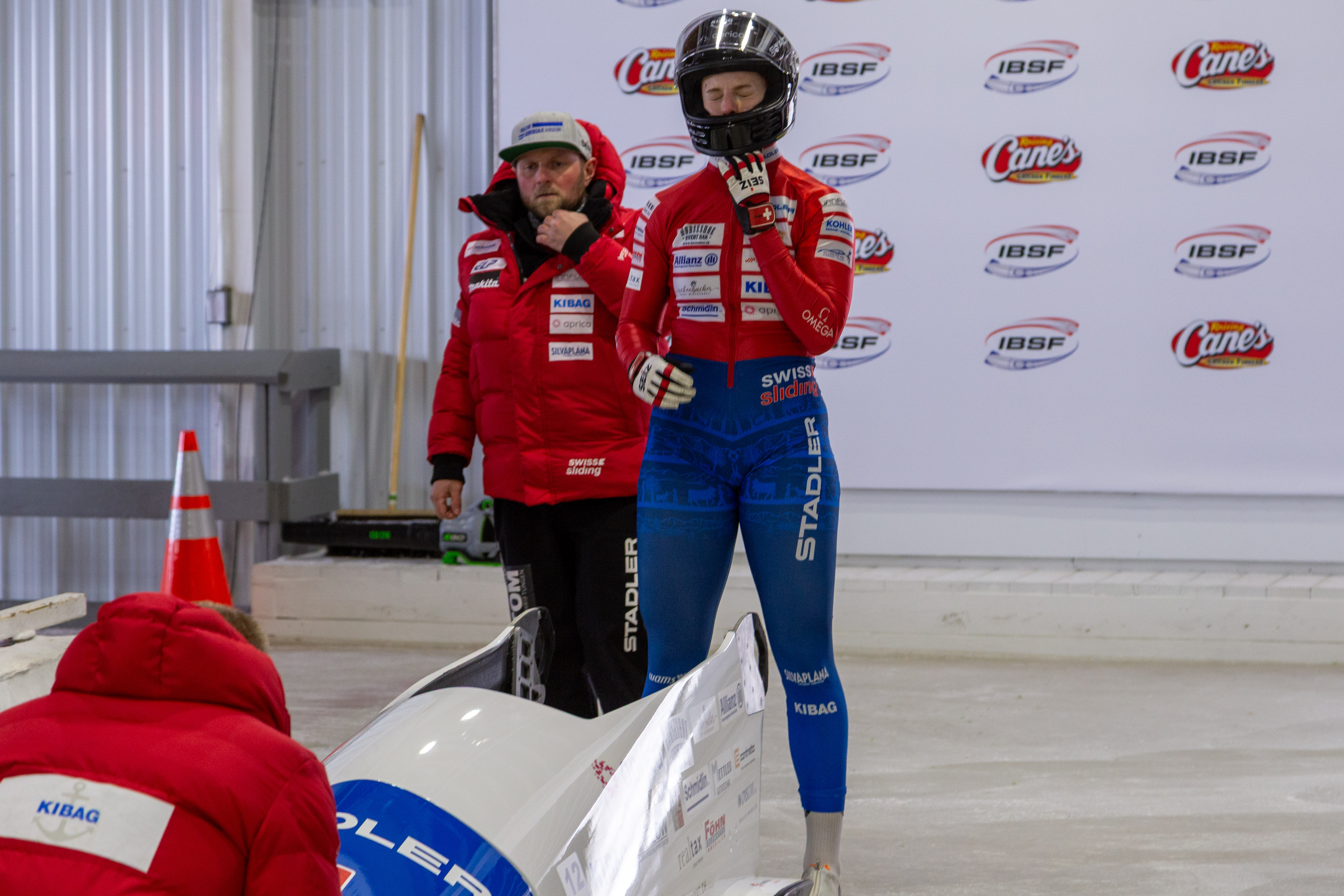
Annen at the start of heat one of the monobob event at the IBSF World Championships 2025 at Lake Placid.

All results are sourced from the International Bobsleigh and Skeleton Federation (IBSF).

=== Olympic Games ===
Event	Monobob	Two-woman
(Italy) 2026 Milano Cortina	11th	7th

=== World Championships ===
Event	Monobob	Two-woman
(Germany) 2024 Winterberg	13th	19th
(United States) 2025 Lake Placid	13th	14th
