= Eric Fantazzini =

Italian bobsledder (born 1996)

Personal information
- Nationality: Italian
- Born: 27 April 1996 (age 30) Pavia, Italy

Sport
- Country: Italy
- Sport: Bobsleigh
- Events: Two-man, Four-man

Eric Fantazzini (born 27 April 1996) is an Italian bobsledder. He represented Italy in the 2022 and 2026 Winter Olympics._

== Career ==
Fantazzini participated in artistic gymnastics as a child, and later played football in under-11s. In high school, he participated in track and field in the hammer throw.

Fantazzini began competing in bobsleigh in 2020 as a push athlete. In 2023, Fantazzini earned a silver medal in a Bobsleigh World Cup event at Yanqing pushing for the team of Patrick Baumgartner, marking the first time since 2011 that an Italian sled had earned a medal in World Cup competition. In 2025, the team earned a bronze medal in World Cup competition at Innsbruck.

Fantazzini represented Italy at both the 2022 and 2026 Winter Olympics in four-man, pushing for the team of Patrick Baumgartner in both. In 2022, the team placed 15th. In 2026, the team placed 5th.

== Personal life ==
Fantazzini was born in Pavia. When he was 14, his family moved to Sicily. He has since moved to Tuscany, and currently resides in Peccioli.

== Bobsleigh results ==
All results are sourced from the International Bobsleigh and Skeleton Federation (IBSF).

=== Olympic Games ===
Event	Four-man
(China) 2022 Beijing	15th
(Italy) 2026 Milano Cortina	5th

=== World Championships ===
Event	Two-man	Four-man
(Germany) 2021 Altenberg	18th	15th
(Switzerland) 2023 St. Moritz	10th	10th
(Germany) 2024 Winterberg	—	7th
(United States) 2025 Lake Placid	—	11th
