= Omar Vögele =

Swiss bobsledder (born 1999)

Personal information
- Nationality: Swiss
- Born: 5 February 1999 (age 27) Dübendorf, Switzerland
- Height: 184 cm (6 ft 0 in)
- Weight: 101 kg (223 lb)

Sport
- Country: Switzerland
- Sport: Bobsleigh
- Events: Two-man, Four-man
Medal record
Men's bobsleigh
Representing Switzerland
Junior World Championships
Bronze medal – third place	2024 St. Moritz	Four-man

Omar Vögele (born 5 February 1999) is a Swiss bobsledder. He represented Switzerland at the 2026 Winter Olympics in four-man, pushing for the team of Cédric Follador. They finished sixth in the competition.

Prior to bobsleigh, he was a track and field athlete, competing primarily in high jump.

He currently resides in Zurich.

== Bobsleigh results ==
All results are sourced from the International Bobsleigh and Skeleton Federation (IBSF).

=== Olympic Games ===
Event	Four-man
(Italy) 2026 Milano Cortina	6th

=== World Championships ===
Event	Four-man
(Germany) 2024 Winterberg	10th
(United States) 2025 Lake Placid	14th
