= Cyril Bieri =

Swiss bobsledder (born 1993)

Personal information
- Nationality: Swiss
- Born: 22 October 1993 (age 32) Schangnau, Bern, Switzerland
- Height: 183 cm (6 ft 0 in)
- Weight: 94 kg (207 lb)

Sport
- Country: Switzerland
- Sport: Bobsleigh
- Events: Two-man, Four-man
Medal record
Men's bobsleigh
Representing Switzerland
European Championships
Bronze medal – third place	2023 Altenberg	Four-man

Cyril Bieri (born 22 October 1993) is a Swiss bobsledder. He represented Switzerland at the 2022 and 2026 Winter Olympics.

== Career ==
In his youth, Bieri participated in multiple sports, including gymnastics, badminton, and unihockey. Bieri moved away from these sports after focusing on his professional career, but was given the opportunity to try bobsleigh in 2017. Bieri made his competitive debut in 2017 as a push athlete in the North American Cup before beginning to compete in the Bobsleigh World Cup beginning in 2018. Bieri earned a bronze medal in four-man at the IBSF European Championships 2023, pushing for the team of Michael Vogt.

Bieri was selected to represented Switzerland at both the 2022 and 2026 Winter Olympics. In 2022, he pushed for the team of Michael Vogt, where they finished 11th. In 2026, he pushed for the team of Timo Rohner in four-man, finishing 15th.

== Bobsleigh results ==
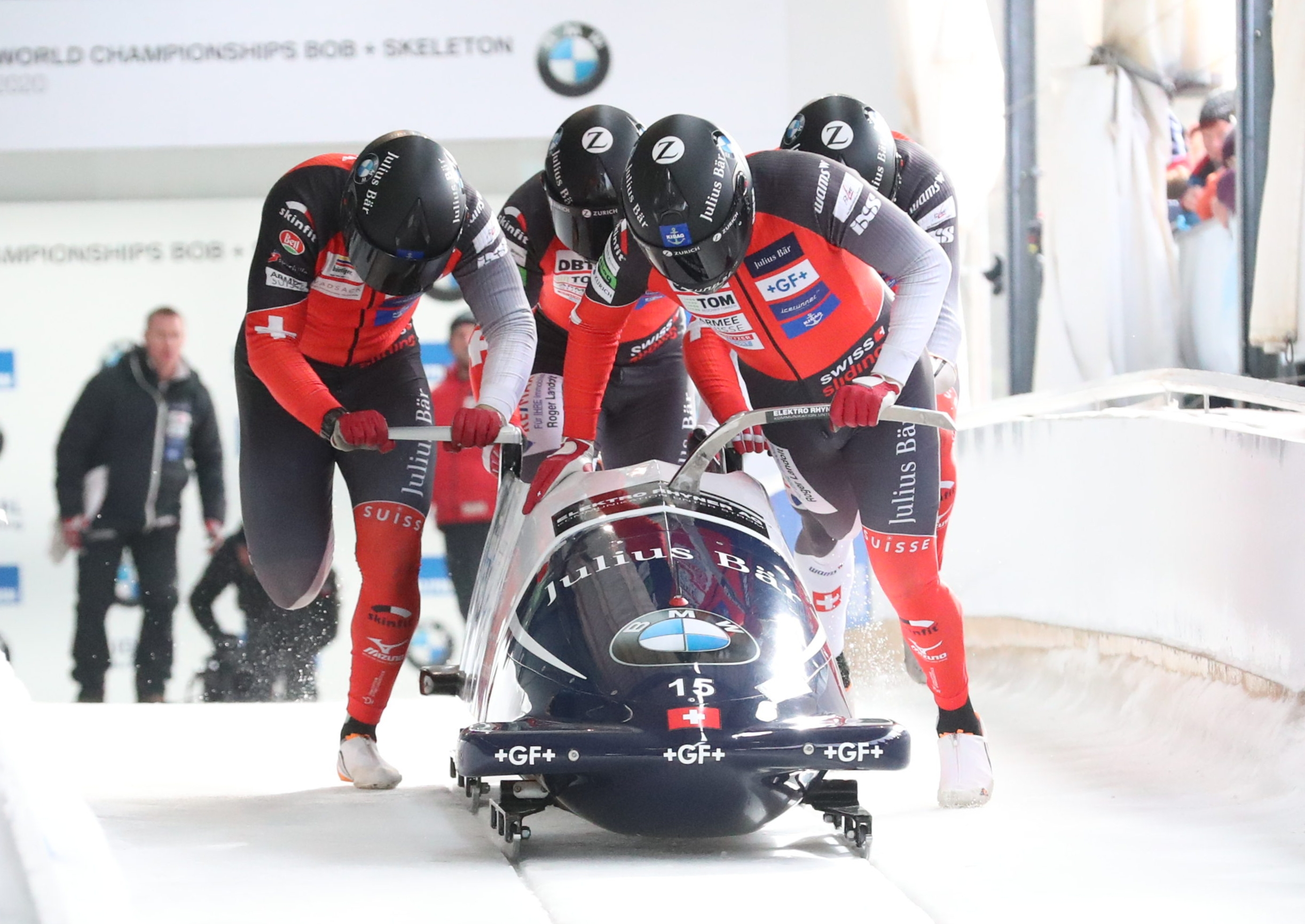
Bieri as part of a four-man team competing at Altenberg in 2020.

All results are sourced from the International Bobsleigh and Skeleton Federation (IBSF).

=== Olympic Games ===
Event	Four-man
(China) 2022 Beijing	11th
(Italy) 2026 Milano Cortina	15th

=== World Championships ===
Event	Four-man
(Canada) 2019 Whistler	19th
(Germany) 2020 Altenberg	9th
(Switzerland) 2023 St. Moritz	5th
