= Constantin Dinescu =

Romanian bobsledder (born 2002)

Personal information
- Nationality: Romanian
- Born: 14 October 2002 (age 23) Curtea de Argeș, Romania

Sport
- Country: Romania
- Sport: Bobsleigh
- Events: Two-man, Four-man

Constantin Dinescu (born 14 October 2002) is a Romanian bobsledder. He represented Romania at the 2026 Winter Olympics in four-man, pushing for the team of Mihai Tentea. The team finished 17th.

== Bobsleigh results ==
All results are sourced from the International Bobsleigh and Skeleton Federation (IBSF).

=== Olympic Games ===
Event	Four-man
(Italy) 2026 Milano Cortina	17th

=== World Championships ===
Event	Four-man
(Germany) 2024 Winterberg	DNS
(United States) 2025 Lake Placid	17th
