= Boone Niederhofer =

American bobsledder (born 1993)

Personal information
- Born: September 23, 1993 (age 32) Abilene, Texas, U.S.
- Home town: San Antonio, Texas, U.S.

Sport
- Country: United States
- Sport: Bobsleigh
- Event: Four-man

Boone Niederhofer (born September 23, 1993) is an American bobsledder, specifically a pusher, and petroleum engineer. He represented the United States at the 2026 Winter Olympics.

== Early life and education ==
Niederhofer was born to Dan and Janet Niederhofer. He attended Winston Churchill High School in San Antonio, Texas, where he played baseball and football. He then attended Texas A&M as a walk-on wide receiver, eventually earning a scholarship, and finished his career with 35 catches for 330 yards and one touchdown. His father played football for Abilene Christian University and for the Birmingham Stallions of the USFL. Niederhofer received a B.S. in petroleum engineering from A&M in 2016.

== Bobsledding career ==
Niederhofer's bobsledding journey began in 2019, shortly after he was laid off by a Midland, Texas oil company. While looking for work, he received a call from former A&M teammate Sam Moeller, who had recently been selected for the US bobsled training program. With Niederhofer's football aspirations having ended due to a torn ACL in his final A&M game, he went to a combine for prospective Olympic athletes on the A&M campus and was chosen for the same training program. After several years of dividing his time between work as an engineer, training, and racing, he found a job with another oil company in the Permian Basin of Texas that gave him the flexibility to pursue a spot on the US team for the 2026 Olympics.

Niederhofer competed in the IBSF World Championships 2025 and finished in fourth place in the four-man event. In January 2026, he was selected to represent the United States at the 2026 Winter Olympics.

== Personal life ==
Niederhofer's wife Chloe was described by ESPN journalist Dave Wilson as "a high achiever herself, the 2015 Miss Teen Texas USA." The couple has two children, a daughter and a son.
