= Mihai Păcioianu =

Romanian skeleton racer and bobsledder (born 1999)

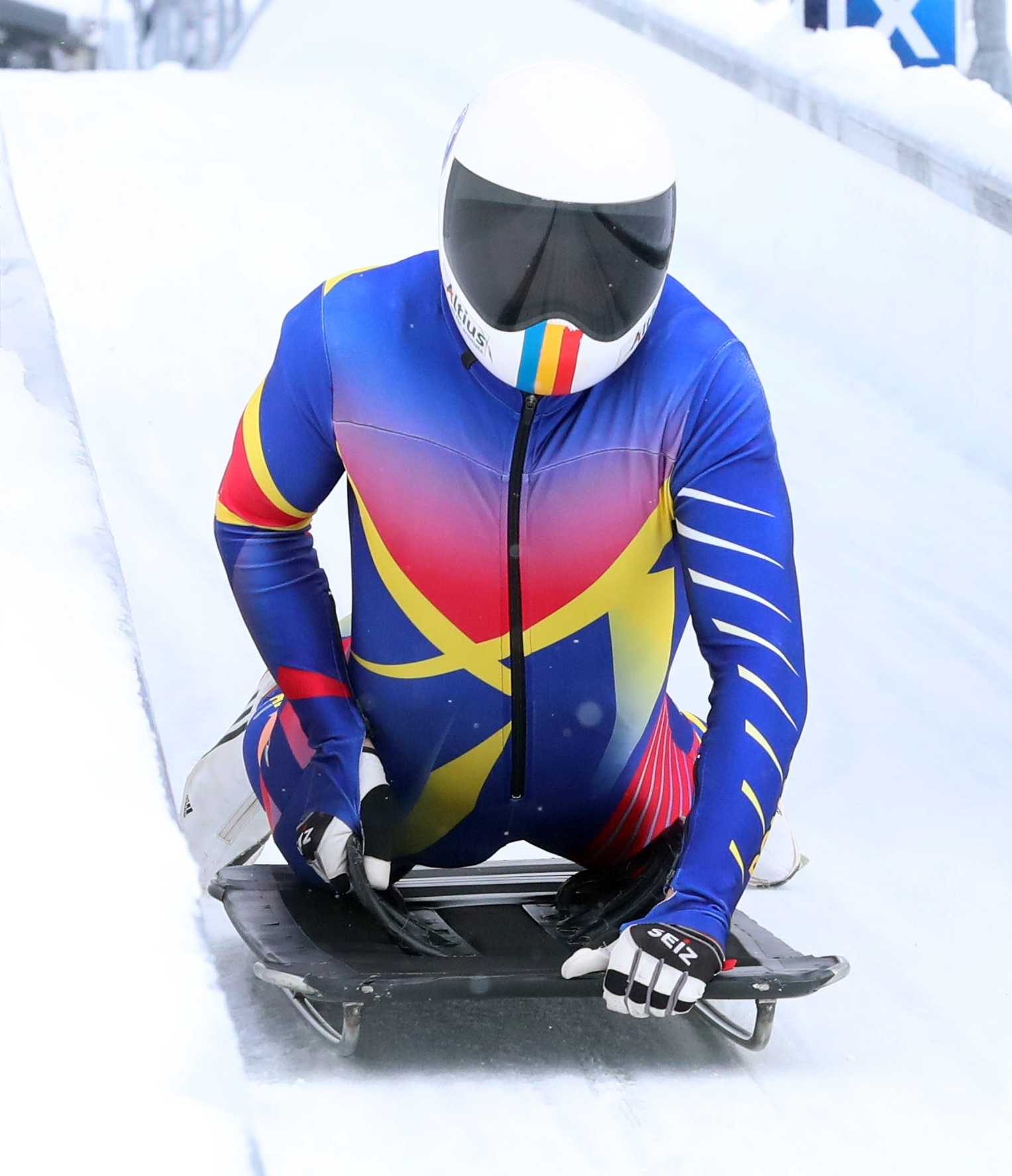
- Păcioianu competing in a skeleton event in 2021

Personal information
- Full name: Mihai Daniel Păcioianu
- Nationality: Romanian
- Born: 19 February 1999 (age 27) Câmpulung, Romania
- Height: 178 cm (5 ft 10 in)
- Weight: 87 kg (192 lb)

Sport
- Country: Romania
- Sport: Skeleton, Bobsleigh
- Events: Two-man, Four-man (bobsleigh)
Medal record
Men's bobsleigh
Representing Romania
Junior European Championships
Silver medal – second place	2023 Winterberg	Four-man

Mihai Daniel Păcioianu (born 19 February 1999) is a Romanian skeleton racer and bobsledder. In Bobsleigh, he represented Romania at the 2026 Winter Olympics. Păcioianu began his career as a skeleton racer, competing in the Europe Cup, Intercontinental Cup, and occasionally in the Skeleton World Cup. He transitioned full time to a push-man in bobsleigh in 2022. At the 2026 Winter Olympics, he represented Romania pushing for the team of Mihai Tentea. The team placed 17th in the event.

== Results ==
All results are sourced from the International Bobsleigh and Skeleton Federation (IBSF).

=== Bobsleigh ===
==== Olympic Games ====
Event	Four-man
(Italy) 2026 Milano Cortina	17th

=== World Championships ===
Event	Four-man
(Switzerland) 2023 St. Moritz	16th
(Germany) 2024 Winterberg	DNS
(United States) 2025 Lake Placid	17th

=== Skeleton ===
==== World Championships ====
Event	Placing
(Austria) 2016 Innsbruck	31st
(Germany) 2021 Altenberg	28th
