= Kim Sun-wook =

South Korean bobsledder (born 2000)

Personal information
- Nationality: South Korean
- Born: 23 December 2000 (age 25) Seoul, South Korea
- Height: 177 cm (5 ft 10 in)
- Weight: 75 kg (165 lb)

Sport
- Country: South Korea
- Sport: Bobsleigh
- Events: Two-man, Four-man

Kim Sun-wook (Korean: 김선욱; born 23 December 2000) is a South Korean bobsledder. He represented South Korea at the 2026 Winter Olympics pushing for the team of Kim Jin-su in four-man. The team finished eighth.

== Bobsleigh results ==
All results are sourced from the International Bobsleigh and Skeleton Federation (IBSF).

=== Olympic Games ===
Event	Four-man
(Italy) 2026 Milano Cortina	8th

=== World Championships ===
Event	Four-man
(United States) 2025 Lake Placid	9th
