= Noe Näff =

Swiss cross-country skier (born 2003)

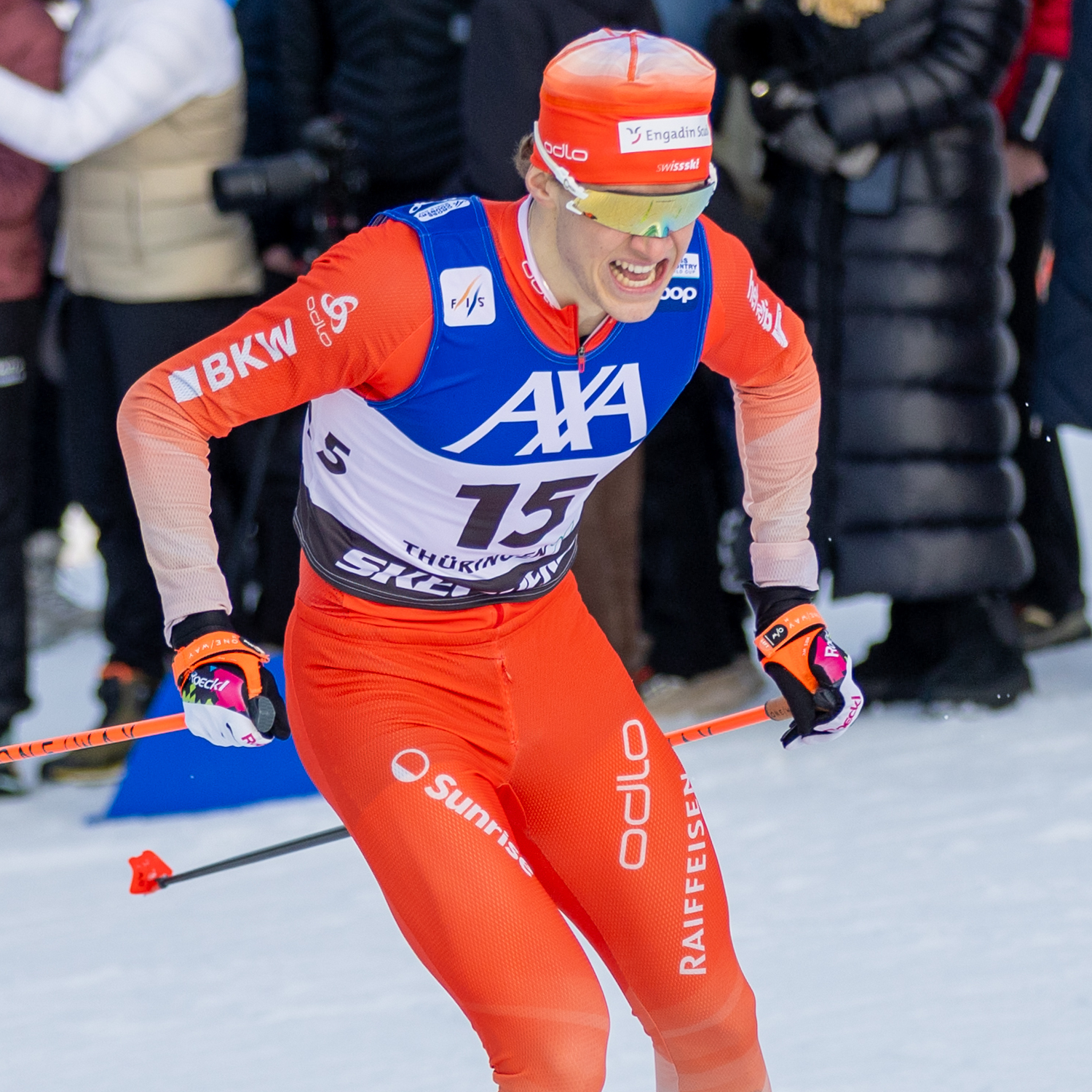
- Naff in 2026

Personal information
- Nationality: Switzerland
- Born: 2 October 2003 (age 22) Valsot, Switzerland

Sport
- Sport: Skiing

World Cup career
- Seasons: 3 – (2024–present)
- Indiv. starts: 11
- Team starts: 3
- Updated on 10 February 2026

Noe Näff (born 2 October 2003) is a Swiss cross-country skier who represented Switzerland at the 2026 Winter Olympics.

== Career ==
In January 2026, he was selected to represent Switzerland at the 2026 Winter Olympics.

== Personal life ==
His brother, Isai, is also a cross-country skier.
