= Mike Evelyn =

Canadian bobsledder (born 1993)

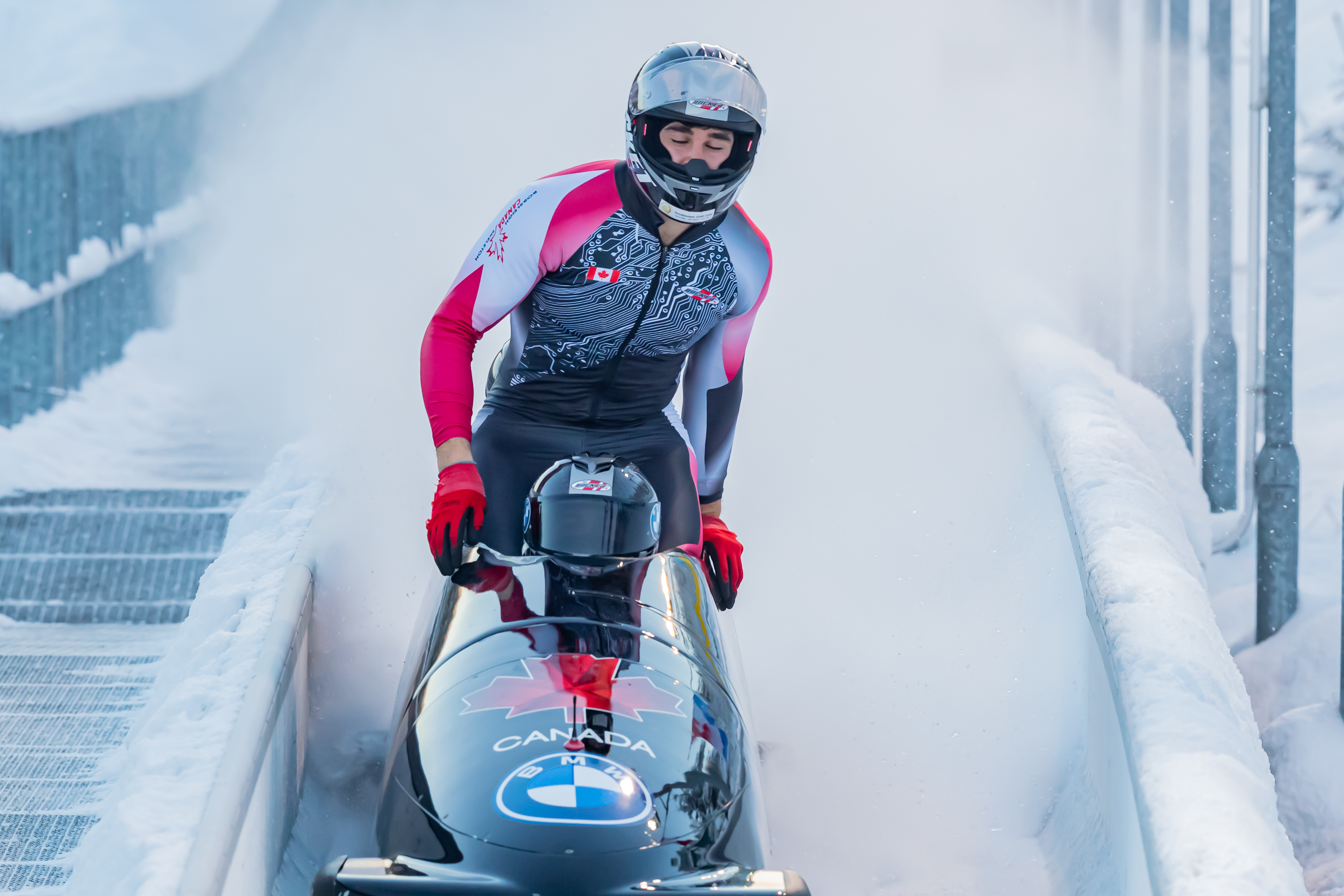
- Mike Evelyn at 2021 IBSF World Championships

Personal information
- Full name: Mike Evelyn O'Higgins
- Born: 13 April 1993 (age 33) Ottawa, Ontario, Canada

Sport
- Country: Canada
- Sport: Bobsleigh
- Events: Two-man, Four-man

Mike Evelyn (born 13 April 1993) is a Canadian bobsledder who competes in the two-man and four-man events as a brakeman.

== Career ==
Evelyn is a former ice hockey player who switched to bobsleigh during the 2019–20 season.

In January 2022, Evelyn was named to Canada's 2022 Olympic team.

Alongside his success in bobsled, Evelyn received a degree in electrical engineering from Dalhousie University in 2019 and works as a systems engineer.
