= Jēkabs Kalenda =

Latvian bobsledder (born 2002)

Personal information
- Born: 25 June 2002 (age 24) Ventspils, Latvia
- Height: 183 cm (6 ft 0 in)
- Weight: 106 kg (234 lb)

Sport
- Country: Latvia
- Sport: Bobsleigh
- Events: Two-man, Four-man
- Turned pro: 2021

Jēkabs Kalenda (born 25 June 2002) is a Latvian bobsledder who competes in the IBSF World Cup. He was selected to represent Latvia at the 2026 Winter Olympics.

== Career ==
Prior to bobsledding, Kalenda participated in sprint canoeing and was part of Latvia's national Junior and Under-23 teams.

In 2021, Kalenda switched sports to bobsledding and made his first competitive start at Sigulda as part of the European Cup. In 2022, Kalenda finished 4th in the under-23 two-man World Championships. The following year in 2023, he made his debut in the IBSF World Cup. In the 2024 race at Sigulda, Kalenda finished fifth in the two-man event, which is to date his best race result.

Kalenda was selected to represent Lativa in bobsleigh at the 2026 Winter Olympics in both the two-man and four-man competitions. In the two-man, he and brakeman Matīss Miknis finished eighth out of 26 starters.

== Bobsleigh results ==
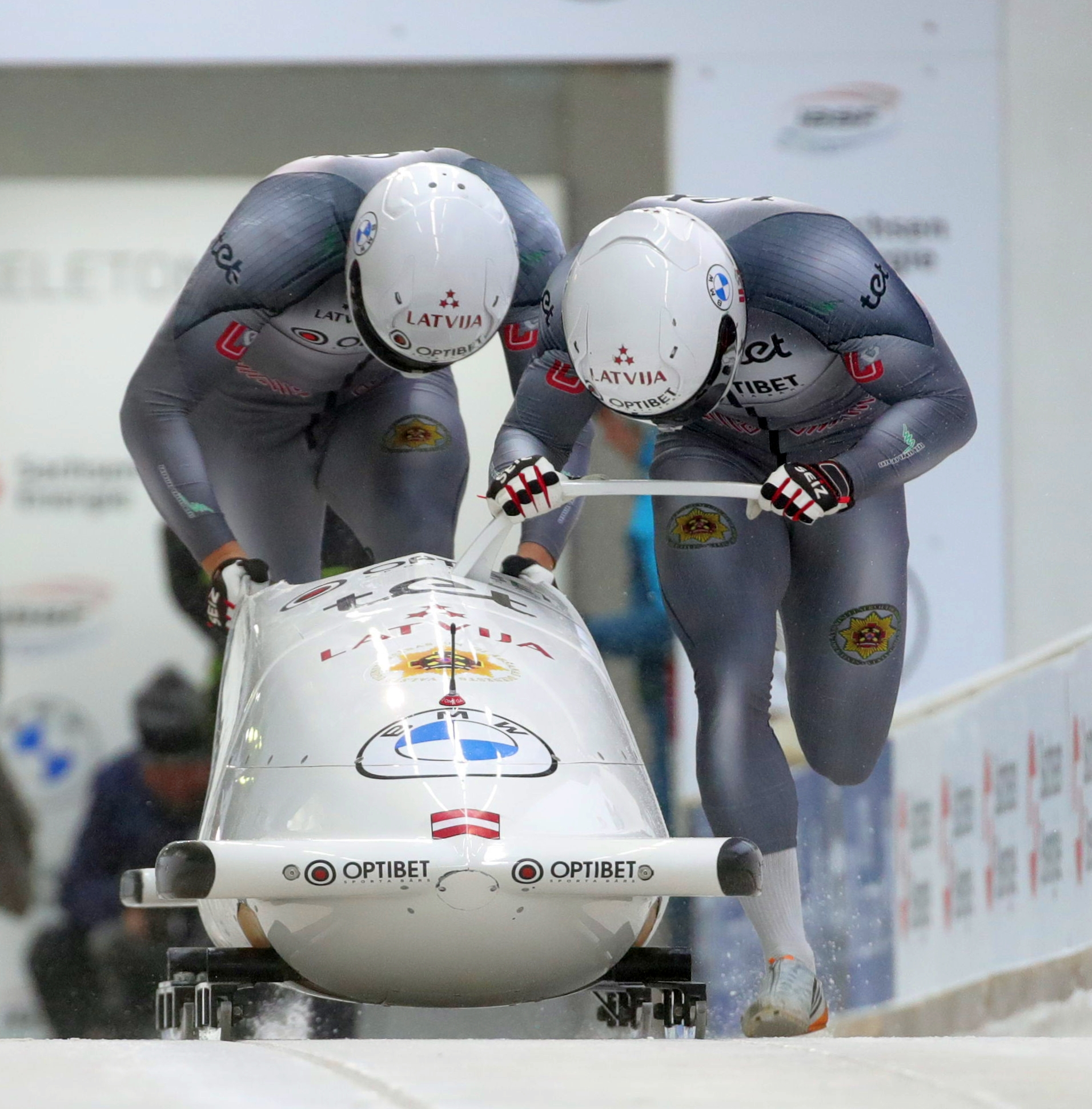
Kalenda and brakeman Ivo Kleinbergs competing in a World Cup event at Altenberg in 2023.

All results are sourced from the International Bobsleigh and Skeleton Federation (IBSF).

=== Olympic Games ===
Event	Two-man	Four-man
(Italy) 2026 Milano Cortina	8th	10th

=== World Championships ===
Event	Two-man	Four-man
(Switzerland) 2023 St. Moritz	13th	DNF
(Germany) 2024 Winterberg	DNF	DNF
(United States) 2025 Lake Placid	11th	15th
