= Mathieu Hersperger =

Swiss bobsledder (born 1999)

Personal information
- Nationality: Swiss
- Born: 18 February 1999 (age 27) Seewen, Solothurn, Switzerland

Sport
- Country: Switzerland
- Sport: Bobsleigh
- Events: Two-man, Four-man
Medal record
Men's bobsleigh
Representing Switzerland
Junior World Championships
Bronze medal – third place	2024 St. Mortiz	Four-man
Junior European Championships
Silver medal – second place	2022 Winterberg	Four-man
Bronze medal – third place	2022 Winterberg	Two-man
Bronze medal – third place	2024 Altenberg	Four-man

Mathieu Hersperger (born 18 February 1999) is a Swiss bobsledder. He represented Switzerland at the 2026 Winter Olympics in four-man, pushing for the team of Timo Rohner.

== Career ==
Hersperger began as a track and field athlete, specializing as a sprinter. He began competing in bobsleigh beginning in 2021. In 2024, Hersperger earned a bronze medal at the IBSF Junior World Championships in four-man pushing for the team of Timo Rohner.

Hersperger represented Switzerland at the 2026 Winter Olympics in four-man, still pushing for Timo Rohner's team. The team placed 15th.

== Bobsleigh results ==
All results are sourced from the International Bobsleigh and Skeleton Federation (IBSF).

=== Olympic Games ===
Event	Four-man
(Italy) 2026 Milano Cortina	15th

=== World Championships ===
Event	Four-man
(Germany) 2024 Winterberg	14th
(United States) 2025 Lake Placid	10th
