= Andreas Haas (bobsledder) =

Swiss bobsledder (born 1996)

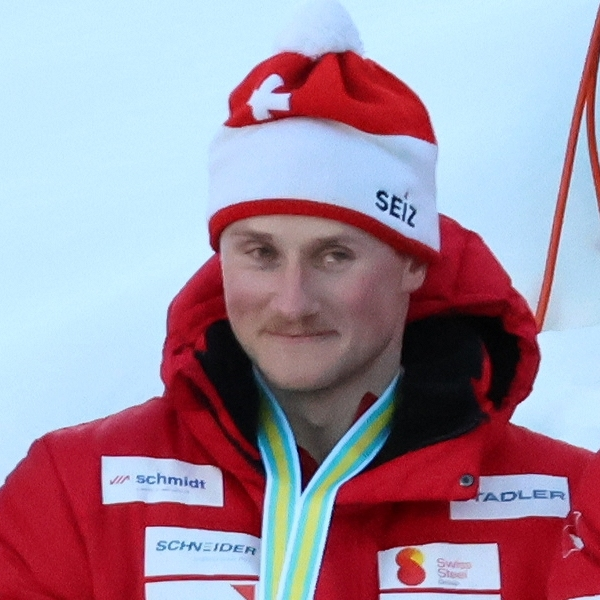
- Haas in 2025

Personal information
- Born: 23 December 1996 (age 29) Menznau, Switzerland

Sport
- Country: Switzerland
- Sport: Bobsleigh
- Event(s): Two-man, four-man
Medal record
Men's bobsleigh
Representing Switzerland
Olympic Games
Bronze medal – third place	2026 Milano Cortina	Four-man
European Championships
Bronze medal – third place	2025 Lillehammer	Four-man
Bronze medal – third place	2026 St. Moritz	Four-man

Andreas Haas (born 23 December 1996) is a Swiss bobsledder. He represented Switzerland at the 2022 and 2026 Winter Olympics.

== Career ==
Haas competed at the IBSF European Championships 2025 and won a bronze medal in the four-man event with a time of 1:40.05. He again competed at the IBSF European Championships 2026 and won a bronze medal in the four-man event with a time of 2:10.06. He was then selected to represent Switzerland at the 2026 Winter Olympics. He won a bronze medal in the four-man event with a time of 3:38.64. This marked Switzerland's first medal in bobsled since 2014, and first medal in the four-man event in 20 years.
