= Cédric Follador =

Swiss bobsledder (born 1994)

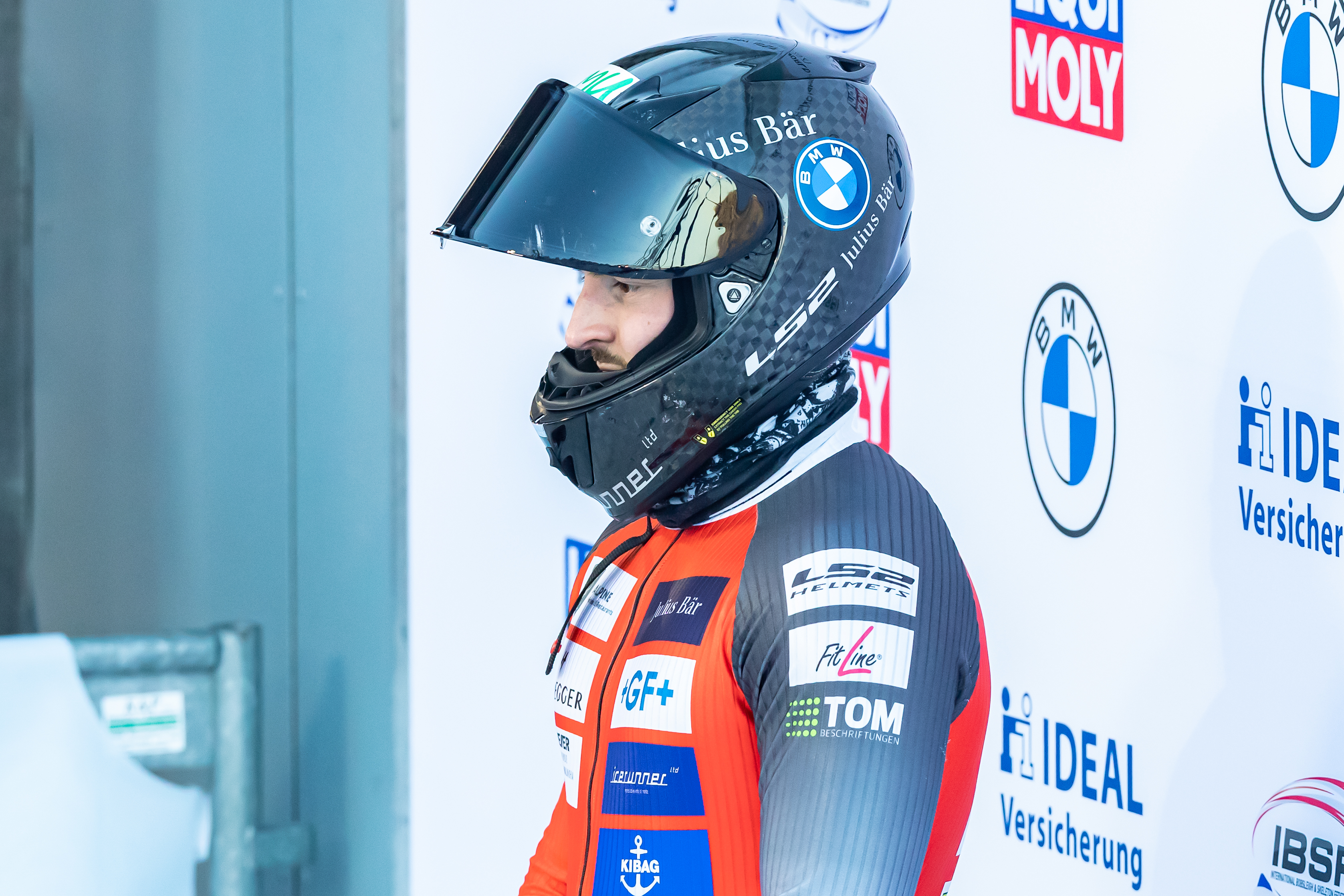
- Follador competing at Altenberg in 2021

Personal information
- Nationality: Swiss
- Born: 18 November 1994 (age 31) St. Gallen, Switzerland

Sport
- Country: Switzerland
- Sport: Bobsleigh
- Events: Two-man, Four-man
- Turned pro: 2020

Cédric Follador (born 18 November 1994) is a Swiss bobsledder in two-man and four-man competition. He was selected to represent Switzerland at the 2026 Winter Olympics.

== Career ==
Follador began competing for Switzerland's national bobsled team in 2020. In 2023, he was named to Switzerland's World Cup team, where he has remained since. In the World Championships, his current best results are a 10th in two-man in 2025 and a 9th in four-man in 2023. In 2026, Follador participated in the Winter Olympics in both two-man and four-man. He finished 14th two-man event.

Just prior to the 2026 Olympics, Follador launched a crowdfunding campaign to fund his Olympics venture as well as training and World Cup visits for the year. His funding goal was 186,000 fr. (approx. €200,000).

== Personal life ==
Follador is engaged to Michelle Gloor, a brake-woman in women's bobsled. The two met in 2022 during bobsleigh training and began dating in 2023. Follador has supported Gloor after Gloor was diagnosed with cancer in late 2024. Follador proposed to Gloor in December 2025.

== Bobsleigh results ==
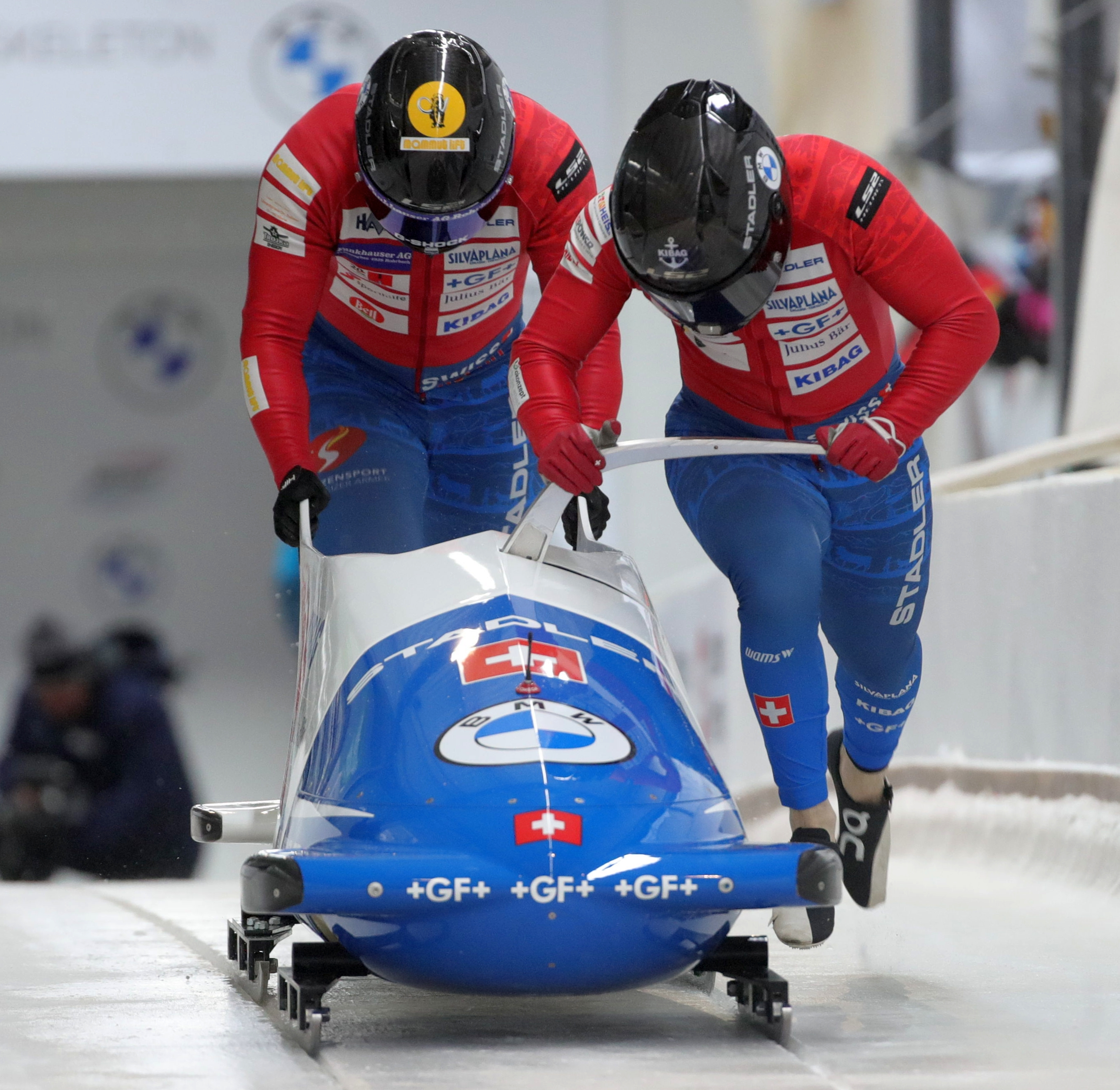
Follador and brakeman Andreas Haas competing in a World Cup event at Altenberg in 2023.

All results are sourced from the International Bobsleigh and Skeleton Federation (IBSF).

=== Olympic Games ===
Event	Two-man	Four-man
(Italy) 2026 Milano Cortina	14th	6th

=== World Championships ===
Event	Two-man	Four-man
(Germany) 2021 Altenberg	—	19th
(Switzerland) 2023 St. Moritz	—	9th
(Germany) 2024 Winterberg	11th	12th
(United States) 2025 Lake Placid	10th	14th
