= Kim Jin-su (bobsledder) =

South Korean bobsledder (born 1995)

Personal information
- Nationality: South Korean
- Born: 19 July 1995 (age 30) Gangwon Province, South Korea
- Height: 1.79 m (5 ft 10 in)
- Weight: 78 kg (172 lb)

Sport
- Country: South Korea
- Sport: Bobsleigh

Kim Jin-su (born 19 July 1995) is a South Korean bobsledder who competed at the 2022 Winter Olympics. Although he joined the South Korean team in 2013, he made the switch from brakeman to driver after the 2022 Olympics. His achievements include being the driver of the first South Korean 4-man team to medal at an IBSF Bobsleigh World Cup event in Cortina d'Ampezzo, Italy.
