= Kristopher Horn =

American bobsledder (born 1994)

Kris Horn
Personal information
- Full name: Kristopher Horn
- Born: April 25, 1994 (age 32) Weymouth, Massachusetts, U.S.

Sport
- Country: United States
- Sport: Bobsleigh
- Event: Two-man
Medal record
World Championships
| Bronze medal – third place | 2019 Whistler | Mixed team |

Kristopher Horn (born April 25, 1994) is an American bobsledder.

He participated at the IBSF World Championships 2019, winning a medal.

He represented the United States at the 2022 and 2026 Winter Olympics.
