= Freestyle skiing at the 2018 Winter Olympics – Women's slopestyle =

Women's slopestyle at the XXIII Olympic Winter Games
- Venue: Bogwang Phoenix Park, Pyeongchang, South Korea
- Dates: 17 February
- Competitors: 23 from 12 nations
- Winning Score: 91.20

Medalists
1st place, gold medalist(s)		Sarah Höfflin	Switzerland
2nd place, silver medalist(s)		Mathilde Gremaud	Switzerland
3rd place, bronze medalist(s)		Isabel Atkin	Great Britain

The Women's slopestyle event in freestyle skiing at the 2018 Winter Olympics took place on 17 February 2018 at the Bogwang Phoenix Park, Pyeongchang, South Korea.

== Qualification ==
The top 30 athletes in the Olympic quota allocation list qualified, with a maximum of four athletes per National Olympic Committee (NOC) allowed. All athletes qualifying must also have placed in the top 30 of a FIS World Cup event or the FIS Freestyle Ski and Snowboarding World Championships 2017 during the qualification period (July 1, 2016 to January 21, 2018) and also have a minimum of 50 FIS points to compete. If the host country, South Korea, did not qualify, their chosen athlete would displace the last qualified athlete, granted all qualification criterion was met.

== Results ==
=== Qualification ===
Q — Qualified for the Final

The top 12 athletes in the qualifiers moved on to the medal round.

Rank	Start Order	Bib	Name	Country	Run 1	Run 2	Best	Notes
1	22	17	Emma Dahlström	Sweden	91.40	57.60	91.40	Q
2	2	2	Tiril Sjåstad Christiansen	Norway	55.80	89.00	89.00	Q
3	15	3	Johanne Killi	Norway	87.80	64.20	87.80	Q
4	14	12	Isabel Atkin	Great Britain	13.20	86.80	86.80	Q
5	23	23	Mathilde Gremaud	Switzerland	85.40	71.60	85.40	Q
6	18	18	Devin Logan	United States	84.80	37.60	84.80	Q
7	1	10	Sarah Höfflin	Switzerland	83.00	21.20	83.00	Q
8	13	5	Anastasia Tatalina	Olympic Athletes from Russia	27.40	81.00	81.00	Q
9	4	15	Yuki Tsubota	Canada	65.40	78.20	78.20	Q
10	16	8	Katie Summerhayes	Great Britain	75.80	77.60	77.60	Q
11	12	1	Jennie-Lee Burmansson	Sweden	17.40	77.00	77.00	Q
12	7	7	Maggie Voisin	United States	72.80	73.00	73.00	Q
13	21	22	Lee Mee-hyun	South Korea	46.80	72.80	72.80	
14	9	9	Lana Prusakova	Olympic Athletes from Russia	42.20	70.60	70.60	
15	8	6	Tess Ledeux	France	69.40	28.40	69.40	
16	17	20	Lara Wolf	Austria	10.20	66.40	66.40	
17	11	14	Darian Stevens	United States	8.20	64.00	64.00	
18	6	11	Kea Kühnel	Germany	19.40	59.60	59.60	
19	20	21	Lou Barin	France	50.60	38.40	50.60	
20	5	13	Dominique Ohaco	Chile	16.00	38.60	38.60	
21	19	19	Dara Howell	Canada	12.80	32.00	32.00	
22	3	16	Kim Lamarre	Canada	22.80	23.60	23.60	
23	10	4	Caroline Claire	United States	20.00	16.40	20.00	

=== Final ===
The final was held at 13:56.

Rank	Start Order	Bib	Name	Country	Run 1	Run 2	Run 3	Best	Notes
1st place, gold medalist(s)	6	10	Sarah Höfflin	Switzerland	83.80	27.80	91.20	91.20	
2nd place, silver medalist(s)	8	23	Mathilde Gremaud	Switzerland	88.00	29.40	29.40	88.00	
3rd place, bronze medalist(s)	9	12	Isabel Atkin	Great Britain	68.40	79.40	84.60	84.60	
4	1	7	Maggie Voisin	United States	26.40	37.60	81.20	81.20	
5	10	3	Johanne Killi	Norway	10.20	76.80	54.40	76.80	
6	4	15	Yuki Tsubota	Canada	74.40	26.40	40.40	74.40	
7	3	8	Katie Summerhayes	Great Britain	61.40	71.40	23.20	71.40	
8	2	1	Jennie-Lee Burmansson	Sweden	42.00	65.00	24.40	65.00	
9	11	2	Tiril Sjåstad Christiansen	Norway	5.20	24.00	60.40	60.40	
10	7	18	Devin Logan	United States	22.60	56.80	10.60	56.80	
11	12	17	Emma Dahlström	Sweden	16.60	52.40	15.40	52.40	
12	5	5	Anastasia Tatalina	Olympic Athletes from Russia	29.40	51.20	13.00	51.20	
