= Freestyle skiing at the 2022 Winter Olympics – Women's slopestyle =

Women's slopestyle at the XXIV Olympic Winter Games
- Freestyle skiing
- Venue: Genting Snow Park, Zhangjiakou
- Date: 14, 15 February 2022
- Competitors: 26 from 16 nations
- Winning points: 86.56

Medalists
| 1st place, gold medalist(s) | | Mathilde Gremaud | Switzerland |
| 2nd place, silver medalist(s) | | Eileen Gu | China |
| 3rd place, bronze medalist(s) | | Kelly Sildaru | Estonia |

The women's slopestyle competition in freestyle skiing at the 2022 Winter Olympics was held on 14 February (qualification) and 15 February (final), at the Genting Snow Park in Zhangjiakou. Originally scheduled for 13 February (qualification) and 14 February (final), the events were delayed due to weather. Mathilde Gremaud of Switzerland won the event, improving on her 2018 silver medal. Eileen Gu of China won the silver medal, and Kelly Sildaru of Estonia bronze. For Sildaru, it was the first Olympic medal. This was also the first Winter Olympics medal for Estonia since 2010.

The defending champion was Sarah Höfflin, who returned but did not qualify for the final. The bronze medalist, Isabel Atkin, qualified for the Olympics as well, but did not participate in the event. At the 2021–22 FIS Freestyle Ski World Cup, there were only three races held before the Olympics, and two of them were won by Sildaru who was leading the rankings. Gu was the 2021 X-Games winner, with Atkin second, and the 2021 world champion, with Gremaud second.

== Qualification ==
A total of 30 athletes qualified to compete at the games. For an athlete to compete they must have a minimum of 50.00 FIS points on the FIS Points List on January 17, 2022, and a top 30 finish in a World Cup event or at the FIS Freestyle Ski World Championships 2021 in either big air or slopestyle. A country could enter a maximum of four athletes into the event.

== Results ==
=== Qualification ===
Q — Qualified for the Final

The top 12 athletes in the qualifiers move on to the medal round.

| Rank | Bib | Order | Name | Country | Run 1 | Run 2 | Best | Notes |
|---|---|---|---|---|---|---|---|---|
| 1 | 2 | 4 | Kelly Sildaru | Estonia | 80.96 | 86.15 | 86.15 | Q |
| 2 | 5 | 5 | Johanne Killi | Norway | 81.48 | 86.00 | 86.00 | Q |
| 3 | 3 | 1 | Eileen Gu | China | 57.28 | 79.38 | 79.38 | Q |
| 4 | 10 | 14 | Maggie Voisin | United States | 72.78 | 65.93 | 72.78 | Q |
| 5 | 16 | 27 | Anastasia Tatalina | ROC | 63.85 | 72.03 | 72.03 | Q |
| 6 | 9 | 16 | Kirsty Muir | Great Britain | 70.11 | 63.91 | 70.11 | Q |
| 7 | 12 | 21 | Marin Hamill | United States | 69.43 | 37.36 | 69.43 | Q |
| 8 | 18 | 12 | Silvia Bertagna | Italy | 65.25 | 68.90 | 68.90 | Q |
| 9 | 1 | 3 | Tess Ledeux | France | 22.13 | 68.13 | 68.13 | Q |
| 10 | 14 | 17 | Katie Summerhayes | Great Britain | 66.56 | 59.11 | 66.56 | Q |
| 11 | 17 | 23 | Olivia Asselin | Canada | 64.68 | 6.75 | 64.68 | Q |
| 12 | 7 | 7 | Mathilde Gremaud | Switzerland | 39.41 | 63.46 | 63.46 | Q |
| 13 | 6 | 9 | Megan Oldham | Canada | 6.45 | 63.10 | 63.10 | |
| 14 | 15 | 13 | Lara Wolf | Austria | 62.56 | 24.38 | 62.56 | |
| 15 | 24 | 10 | Anni Kärävä | Finland | 55.80 | 61.73 | 61.73 | |
| 16 | 19 | 24 | Margaux Hackett | New Zealand | 54.93 | 37.28 | 54.93 | |
| 17 | 27 | 20 | Alia Delia Eichinger | Germany | 26.45 | 50.68 | 50.68 | |
| 18 | 20 | 11 | Darian Stevens | United States | 6.18 | 50.01 | 50.01 | |
| 19 | 13 | 18 | Sandra Eie | Norway | 49.08 | 31.31 | 49.08 | |
| 20 | 4 | 2 | Sarah Höfflin | Switzerland | 35.38 | 48.96 | 48.96 | |
| 21 | 21 | 15 | Ksenia Orlova | ROC | 45.31 | 32.20 | 45.31 | |
| 22 | 28 | 6 | Dominique Ohaco | Chile | 17.28 | 44.85 | 44.85 | |
| 23 | 26 | 26 | Yang Shuorui | China | 18.46 | 39.05 | 39.05 | |
| 24 | 25 | 25 | Elisa Maria Nakab | Italy | 8.60 | 32.70 | 32.70 | |
| 25 | 22 | 8 | Laura Wallner | Austria | 30.36 | 30.70 | 30.70 | |
| 26 | 29 | 19 | Abi Harrigan | Australia | 16.10 | 26.31 | 26.31 | |
| | 12 | 22 | Caroline Claire | United States | DNS | | | |

=== Final ===
Marin Hamill advanced to the final but could not compete due to an injury.

| Rank | Bib | Order | Name | Country | Run 1 | Run 2 | Run 3 | Best |
|---|---|---|---|---|---|---|---|---|
| 1st place, gold medalist(s) | 7 | 1 | Mathilde Gremaud | Switzerland | 1.10 | 86.56 | 46.96 | 86.56 |
| 2nd place, silver medalist(s) | 3 | 10 | Eileen Gu | China | 69.90 | 16.98 | 86.23 | 86.23 |
| 3rd place, bronze medalist(s) | 2 | 12 | Kelly Sildaru | Estonia | 82.06 | 46.71 | 78.75 | 82.06 |
| 4 | 16 | 8 | Anastasia Tatalina | ROC | 39.38 | 74.16 | 75.51 | 75.51 |
| 5 | 10 | 9 | Maggie Voisin | United States | 35.48 | 74.28 | 66.03 | 74.28 |
| 6 | 5 | 11 | Johanne Killi | Norway | 24.86 | 73.11 | 71.78 | 73.11 |
| 7 | 1 | 4 | Tess Ledeux | France | 72.91 | 23.08 | 28.81 | 72.91 |
| 8 | 9 | 7 | Kirsty Muir | Great Britain | 41.86 | 71.30 | 69.21 | 71.30 |
| 9 | 14 | 3 | Katie Summerhayes | Great Britain | 60.01 | 64.75 | 23.31 | 64.75 |
| 10 | 18 | 5 | Silvia Bertagna | Italy | 48.50 | 61.85 | 7.83 | 61.85 |
| 11 | 17 | 2 | Olivia Asselin | Canada | 16.83 | DNS | | 16.83 |
| | 12 | 6 | Marin Hamill | United States | DNS | | | |
