= FIS Freestyle Ski and Snowboarding World Championships 2021 – Women's ski big air =

Women's ski big air at the FIS Freestyle Ski and Snowboarding World Championships 2021
- Venue: Aspen/Snowmass
- Location: Aspen, United States
- Date: 15 March (qualification); 16 March
- Competitors: 25 from 16 nations
- Winning points: 184.50

Medalists
gold medal	Anastasia Tatalina
silver medal	Lana Prusakova
bronze medal	Gu Ailing	China

The Women's ski big air competition at the FIS Freestyle Ski and Snowboarding World Championships 2021 was held on 16 March. A qualification was held on 15 March 2021.

== Qualification ==
The qualification was started on 15 March at 13:20. The best eight skiers qualified for the final.

Rank	Bib	Start order	Name	Country	Run 1	Run 2	Best	Notes
1	2	10	Tess Ledeux	France	95.00	28.75	95.00	Q
2	8	6	Silvia Bertagna	Italy	83.50	94.00	94.00	Q
3	12	18	Anastasia Tatalina	Russian Ski Federation	93.25	24.75	93.25	Q
4	4	9	Megan Oldham	Canada	92.00	24.75	92.00	Q
5	3	1	Sarah Höfflin	Switzerland	90.00	DNS	90.00	Q
6	6	5	Gu Ailing	China	69.50	88.50	88.50	Q
7	10	2	Sandra Eie	Norway	80.75	87.25	87.25	Q
8	21	17	Lana Prusakova	Russian Ski Federation	81.75	14.00	81.75	Q
9	16	13	Maggie Voisin	United States	61.25	80.00	80.00	
10	18	11	Laura Wallner	Austria	59.25	78.75	78.75	
11	17	23	Kirsty Muir	Great Britain	74.50	26.00	74.50	
12	22	21	Anni Kärävä	Finland	59.75	72.50	72.50	
13	26	12	Dominique Ohaco	Chile	71.75	65.50	71.75	
14	7	8	Isabel Atkin	Great Britain	65.50	71.00	71.00	
15	24	25	Kokone Kondo	Japan	42.00	67.25	67.25	
16	13	26	Katie Summerhayes	Great Britain	61.75	65.75	65.75	
17	9	7	Marin Hamill	United States	63.25	62.25	63.25	
18	25	16	Abi Harrigan	Australia	62.25	46.00	62.25	
19	5	3	Margaux Hackett	New Zealand	34.25	62.00	62.00	
20	19	15	Darian Stevens	United States	60.25	57.75	60.25	
21	20	14	Aliah Eichinger	Germany	45.50	54.75	54.75	
22	23	22	Mia Rennie	Australia	48.75	35.25	48.75	
23	11	19	Lara Wolf	Austria	37.75	24.00	37.75	
24	1	4	Mathilde Gremaud	Switzerland	26.50	28.25	28.25	
25	14	24	Rell Harwood	United States	24.50	24.75	24.75	
	15	20	Olivia Asselin	Canada	Did not start			

== Final ==
The final was started on 16 March at 10:00.

Rank	Bib	Start order	Name	Country	Run 1	Run 2	Run 3	Total
1st place, gold medalist(s)	12	6	Anastasia Tatalina	Russian Ski Federation	93.00	91.50	30.25	184.50
2nd place, silver medalist(s)	21	1	Lana Prusakova	Russian Ski Federation	75.50	23.75	90.00	165.50
3rd place, bronze medalist(s)	6	3	Gu Ailing	China	25.00	87.25	74.25	161.50
4	4	5	Megan Oldham	Canada	66.50	92.25	20.25	158.75
5	10	2	Sandra Eie	Norway	86.00	68.25	68.00	154.25
6	2	8	Tess Ledeux	France	24.25	92.75	21.00	113.75
7	8	7	Silvia Bertagna	Italy	28.25	47.50	77.75	125.25
8	3	4	Sarah Höfflin	Switzerland	23.00	27.75	51.50	79.25
