= Freestyle skiing at the 2016 Winter Youth Olympics – Girls' slopestyle =

Girls' slopestyle events at the Olympics

Girls' slopestyle at the II Winter Youth Olympic Games
- Venue: Hafjell Freepark
- Dates: 19 February
- Competitors: 10 from 10 nations
- Winning points: 77.00

Medalists
1st place, gold medalist(s)		Lana Prusakova	Russia
2nd place, silver medalist(s)		Lou Barin	France
3rd place, bronze medalist(s)		Madison Rowlands	Great Britain

The girls' slopestyle event at the 2016 Winter Youth Olympics took place on 19 February at the Hafjell Freepark.

== Results ==
Rank	Order	Athlete	Country	Run 1	Run 2	Best
1st place, gold medalist(s)	5	Lana Prusakova	Russia	77.00	21.60	77.00
2nd place, silver medalist(s)	1	Lou Barin	France	66.00	72.80	72.80
3rd place, bronze medalist(s)	8	Madison Rowlands	Great Britain	67.20	67.80	67.80
4	10	Lara Wolf	Austria	61.40	62.80	62.80
5	3	Anni Kärävä	Finland	59.60	61.20	61.20
6	7	Mathilde Gremaud	Switzerland	58.20	12.80	58.20
7	4	Esmeralda Villalonga	Argentina	55.40	52.60	55.40
8	6	Nikita Rubocki	United States	50.60	41.40	50.60
9	2	Sophia Insam	Italy	18.20	47.20	47.20
10	9	Tora Johansen	Norway	41.60	41.40	41.60
