= Freestyle skiing at the 2022 Winter Olympics – Women's big air =

Women's big air at the XXIV Olympic Winter Games
- Freestyle skiing
- Venue: Big Air Shougang, Beijing
- Date: 7, 8 February 2022
- Competitors: 25 from 15 nations
- Winning points: 188.25

Medalists
1st place, gold medalist(s)		Eileen Gu	China
2nd place, silver medalist(s)		Tess Ledeux	France
3rd place, bronze medalist(s)		Mathilde Gremaud	Switzerland

The women's big air competition in freestyle skiing at the 2022 Winter Olympics was held on 7 February (qualification) and 8 February (final), at the Big Air Shougang in Beijing. This will be the inaugural freestyle skiing women's big air competition at the Olympics. Eileen Gu, representing China, became the champion, Tess Ledeux of France won the silver medal, and Mathilde Gremaud of Switzerland the bronze medal. For Gu and Ledeux, this was their first Olympic medals.

At the 2021–22 FIS Freestyle Ski World Cup, only two big air events were held before the Olympics. Ledeux won one of them and was second in the other one, and Gu won another event. Anastasia Tatalina was the 2021 world champion. Gremaud was the 2021 X-Games winner.

In the finals, Ledeux won the first run, closely followed by Gu. She continued the lead in the second run, as Gu's run was worse, and Gremaud came up second. However, in the third run Gu had the same score as Ledeux in the first one, and as her first run score was still higher than Ledeux's second run score, she became the champion.

== Qualification ==
A total of 30 athletes qualified to compete at the games. For an athlete to compete they must have a minimum of 50.00 FIS points on the FIS Points List on January 17, 2022, and a top 30 finish in a World Cup event or at the FIS Freestyle Ski World Championships 2021 in either big air or slopestyle. A country could enter a maximum of four athletes into the event.

== Results ==
=== Qualification ===
Q — Qualified for the Final

The top 12 athletes in the qualifiers advanced to the Final.

Rank	Bib	Order	Name	Country	Run 1	Run 2	Run 3	Total	Notes
1	8	20	Megan Oldham	Canada	80.00	91.25	8.25	171.25	Q
2	2	4	Tess Ledeux	France	90.50	80.50	20.00	171.00	Q
3	11	24	Anastasia Tatalina	ROC	68.75	89.75	73.50	163.25	Q
4	16	17	Sandra Eie	Norway	77.50	76.25	84.50	162.00	Q
5	4	5	Eileen Gu	China	89.00	24.50	72.25	161.25	Q
6	1	2	Mathilde Gremaud	Switzerland	88.25	71.00	33.75	159.25	Q
7	12	15	Kirsty Muir	Great Britain	89.25	67.00	68.25	157.50	Q
8	22	22	Darian Stevens	United States	84.75	10.00	67.25	152.00	Q
9	6	26	Sarah Höfflin	Switzerland	85.50	42.75	64.00	149.50	Q
10	5	1	Johanne Killi	Norway	87.50	60.75	58.25	148.25	Q
11	19	16	Olivia Asselin	Canada	60.75	87.00	16.00	147.75	Q
12	24	12	Anni Kärävä	Finland	82.50	52.50	62.00	144.50	Q
13	17	13	Katie Summerhayes	Great Britain	63.75	69.25	67.25	136.50	
14	15	19	Marin Hamill	United States	61.50	66.00	66.25	132.25	
15	14	21	Maggie Voisin	United States	16.25	60.00	68.00	128.00	
16	27	23	Dominique Ohaco	Chile	60.25	11.25	66.25	126.50	
17	3	3	Kelly Sildaru	Estonia	40.25	85.25	28.00	125.50	
18	26	6	Alia Delia Eichinger	Germany	51.00	64.75	39.00	115.75	
19	21	8	Ksenia Orlova	ROC	60.00	54.75	9.00	114.75	
20	20	10	Yang Shuorui	China	38.25	40.50	55.50	96.00	
21	18	11	Lara Wolf	Austria	25.25	36.25	55.25	91.50	
22	13	18	Margaux Hackett	New Zealand	9.75	9.00	65.00	74.75	
23	23	25	Laura Wallner	Austria	59.50	9.00	9.00	68.50	
24	10	14	Caroline Claire	United States	20.00	17.25	DNS	20.00	
25	9	9	Silvia Bertagna	Italy	17.00	16.75	DNS	17.00	
	7	7	Elena Gaskell	Canada	Did not start				

=== Final ===
Rank	Bib	Order	Name	Country	Run 1	Run 2	Run 3	Total
1st place, gold medalist(s)	4	8	Eileen Gu	China	93.75	88.50	94.50	188.25
2nd place, silver medalist(s)	2	11	Tess Ledeux	France	94.50	93.00	73.25	187.50
3rd place, bronze medalist(s)	1	7	Mathilde Gremaud	Switzerland	89.25	93.25	26.00	182.50
4	8	12	Megan Oldham	Canada	85.00	89.25	88.75	178.00
5	12	6	Kirsty Muir	Great Britain	90.25	78.75	15.50	169.00
6	6	4	Sarah Höfflin	Switzerland	82.50	53.00	76.25	158.75
7	5	3	Johanne Killi	Norway	87.75	58.50	65.50	153.25
8	19	2	Olivia Asselin	Canada	62.00	60.25	85.50	147.50
9	24	1	Anni Kärävä	Finland	81.00	54.00	82.50	136.50
10	11	10	Anastasia Tatalina	ROC	75.50	22.25	47.00	122.50
11	22	5	Darian Stevens	United States	56.75	50.75	18.25	75.00
12	16	9	Sandra Eie	Norway	17.00	19.00	64.50	64.50
