= FIS Freestyle Ski and Snowboarding World Championships 2017 – Women's ski slopestyle =

The women's ski slopestyle competition of the FIS Freestyle Ski and Snowboarding World Championships 2017 was held at Sierra Nevada, Spain on March 18 (qualifying) and March 19 (finals). 32 athletes from 17 countries competed.

== Qualification ==
The following are the results of the qualification.

Rank	Bib	Name	Country	Run 1	Run 2	Best	Notes
1	7	Tess Ledeux	France	78.83	91.50	91.50	Q
2	6	Mathilde Gremaud	Switzerland	88.16	37.50	88.16	Q
3	4	Isabel Atkin	Great Britain	85.16	50.83	85.16	Q
4	19	Lara Wolf	Austria	77.83	83.00	83.00	Q
5	5	Emma Dahlström	Sweden	27.33	82.66	82.66	Q
6	10	Giulia Tanno	Switzerland	28.83	82.33	82.33	Q
7	11	Devin Logan	United States	76.33	77.50	77.50	Q
8	1	Sarah Höfflin	Switzerland	28.33	76.83	76.83	Q
9	3	Coline Ballet Baz	France	5.00	74.00	74.00	
10	13	Anouk Purnelle-Faniel	Canada	73.33	25.33	73.33	
11	16	Darian Stevens	United States	71.66	72.50	72.50	
12	33	Anni Kärävä	Finland	70.50	72.00	72.00	
13	20	Yuki Tsubota	Canada	70.83	55.83	70.83	
14	17	Dominique Ohaco	Chile	69.83	68.83	69.83	
15	18	Lana Prusakova	Russia	65.66	14.00	65.66	
16	22	Taylor Lundquist	United States	64.33	8.50	64.33	
17	12	Madison Rowlands	Great Britain	54.16	61.83	61.83	
18	21	Anastasiya Tatalina	Russia	35.33	57.33	57.33	
19	24	Melanie Kraizel	Chile	55.33	9.00	55.33	
20	14	Zuzana Stromková	Slovakia	50.33	52.83	52.83	
21	26	Margaux Hackett	New Zealand	38.16	49.33	49.33	
22	28	Adie Lawrence	New Zealand	38.00	27.50	38.00	
23	31	Tora Johansen	Norway	34.50	24.83	34.50	
24	25	Lee Mee-Hyun	South Korea	28.50	4.50	28.50	
25	30	Kea Kühnel	Germany	15.00	13.00	15.00	
26	23	Kim Lamarre	Canada	4.83	4.50	4.83	
	32	Karoliine Holter	Estonia	DNS		DNS	
	29	Sabrina Cakmakli	Germany	DNS		DNS	
	27	Kaya Turski	Canada	DNS		DNS	
	15	Silvia Bertagna	Italy	DNS		DNS	
	9	Maggie Voisin	United States	DNS		DNS	
	8	Katie Summerhayes	Great Britain	DNS		DNS	

== Final ==
The following are the results of the finals.

Rank	Bib	Name	Country	Run 1	Run 2	Run 3	Best
1st place, gold medalist(s)	7	Tess Ledeux	France	15.60	85.60	23.20	85.60
2nd place, silver medalist(s)	5	Emma Dahlström	Sweden	31.20	27.80	83.80	83.80
3rd place, bronze medalist(s)	4	Isabel Atkin	Great Britain	65.00	25.80	83.20	83.20
4	1	Sarah Höfflin	Switzerland	36.80	42.40	82.60	82.60
5	6	Mathilde Gremaud	Switzerland	16.80	80.80	19.60	80.80
6	11	Devin Logan	United States	74.00	32.80	55.20	74.00
7	19	Lara Wolf	Austria	9.40	61.00	18.60	61.00
8	10	Giulia Tanno	Switzerland	5.20	30.40	52.80	52.80
