= Eileen Gu =

Chinese-American freestyle skier (born 2003)

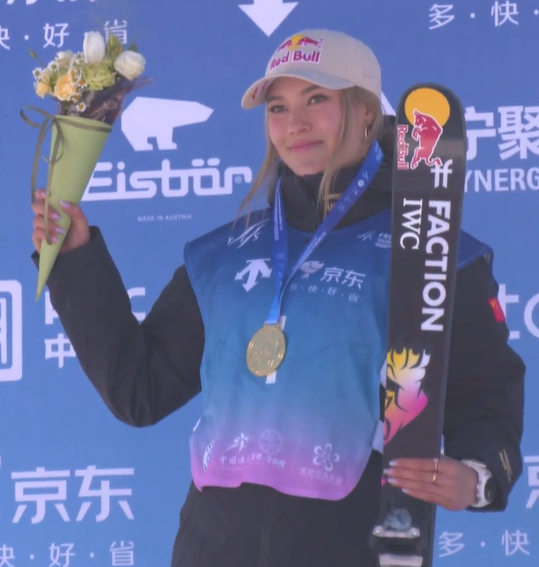
- Gu in 2023 FIS Alpine Ski World Cup

Personal information
- Full name: Eileen Feng Gu; 谷爱凌 (Gǔ Àilíng)
- Nationality: United States, China
- Born: September 3, 2003 (age 23) San Francisco, California, U.S.
- Education: Stanford University (BA)
- Height: 175 cm (5 ft 9 in)

Sport
- Sport: Skiing
- Club: Beijing Nanshan Ski Resort (2019–present); Squaw Valley Ski Team (2018–2019)
Medal record
Women's freestyle skiing
Representing China
| Event | 1st | 2nd | 3rd |
|---|---|---|---|
| Olympic Games | 3 | 3 | 0 |
| World Championships | 2 | 0 | 1 |
| Winter X Games | 3 | 0 | 1 |
| Winter Youth Olympics | 2 | 1 | 0 |
| Total | 10 | 4 | 2 |
Olympic Games
| Gold medal – first place | 2022 Beijing | Big air |
| Gold medal – first place | 2022 Beijing | Halfpipe |
| Gold medal – first place | 2026 Milano Cortina | Halfpipe |
| Silver medal – second place | 2022 Beijing | Slopestyle |
| Silver medal – second place | 2026 Milano Cortina | Big air |
| Silver medal – second place | 2026 Milano Cortina | Slopestyle |
World Championships
| Gold medal – first place | 2021 Aspen | Halfpipe |
| Gold medal – first place | 2021 Aspen | Slopestyle |
| Bronze medal – third place | 2021 Aspen | Big air |
Winter X Games
| Gold medal – first place | 2021 Aspen | Superpipe |
| Gold medal – first place | 2021 Aspen | Slopestyle |
| Bronze medal – third place | 2021 Aspen | Big air |
| Gold medal – first place | 2024 Aspen | Superpipe |
Winter Youth Olympics
| Gold medal – first place | 2020 Lausanne | Big air |
| Gold medal – first place | 2020 Lausanne | Halfpipe |
| Silver medal – second place | 2020 Lausanne | Slopestyle |

Ailing Eileen Gu
- Simplified Chinese: 谷爱凌
- Traditional Chinese: 谷愛凌
Transcriptions
Standard Mandarin
- Hanyu Pinyin: Gǔ Àilíng
- Bopomofo: ㄍㄨˇ ㄞˋ ㄌㄧㄥˊ
- Wade–Giles: Ku^{3} Ai^{4}-ling^{2}
- Tongyong Pinyin: Gǔ Ài-líng
- IPA: [kù âɪ.lǐŋ]

Eileen Feng Gu (born September 3, 2003), also known by her Chinese name Gu Ailing (谷爱凌), is a Chinese-American freestyle skier and model. She has represented China in halfpipe, slopestyle, and big air events since the 2018–19 season. With three gold and three silver medals, Gu is the most decorated freestyle skier in Olympic history.

Gu was born and raised in the United States. She began competing for China in 2019. At age 18, she became the youngest Olympic champion in freestyle skiing after winning gold medals in big air and halfpipe, and a silver medal in slopestyle, at the 2022 Winter Olympics in Beijing. She is the first freestyle skier to win three medals at a single Winter Olympics.

At the 2026 Winter Olympics in Milan-Cortina, Gu won gold in women's halfpipe and two additional silver medals in big air and slopestyle, setting the Olympic medal record in freestyle skiing, surpassing all previous competitors regardless of gender.

Time named Gu as one of the 100 most influential people in the world under its Pioneers category on its annual list in 2022. She was subsequently featured on the magazine's February 9, 2026, edition. She was the fourth-highest earning female athlete in the world in 2025.

Gu won the Laureus World Action Sportsperson of the Year in 2023. She also co-hosted the 2026 Laureus World Sports Awards alongside Novak Djokovic. This marks the first time that two athletes hosted the Laureus World Sports Awards.

== Early life and education ==
Eileen Gu was born on September 3, 2003, in San Francisco, California, United States. Her mother, Yan Gu (Chinese: 谷燕; pinyin: Gǔ Yàn), is a first-generation Chinese immigrant to the United States. Her father is American and a Harvard University graduate. Her maternal grandfather was the chief electrical engineer of the Ministry of Housing and Urban-Rural Development of China.

Yan studied chemistry and biochemistry and was a member of the short-track speed skating team at Peking University in the 1980s. After moving to the United States, she earned a master's degree in biochemistry and molecular biology at Auburn University and an MBA at the Stanford University Graduate School of Business.

Yan raised her daughter as a single mother in San Francisco's Sea Cliff neighborhood. At three years old, Gu began skiing in Lake Tahoe, where Yan once worked as a part-time ski instructor. She joined the Northstar California Resort free-ski team at eight and won her first national championship at nine.

Gu attended primary and middle school at the Katherine Delmar Burke School and went to high school at San Francisco University High. She attended a mathematics cram school during her summers in Beijing and scored 1580 out of 1600 on the SAT.

Gu earned early admittance to Stanford University in December 2020. She entered the freshman class in 2022, the same year she was presented as a debutante at Le Bal des débutantes in Paris. While at Stanford, she joined Kappa Kappa Gamma sorority and studied abroad at the University of Oxford's Magdalen College. An international relations major, Gu took time off in the 2025–26 academic year to prepare for the 2026 Winter Olympics. In June 2026, Gu graduated from Stanford University.

== Sports career ==
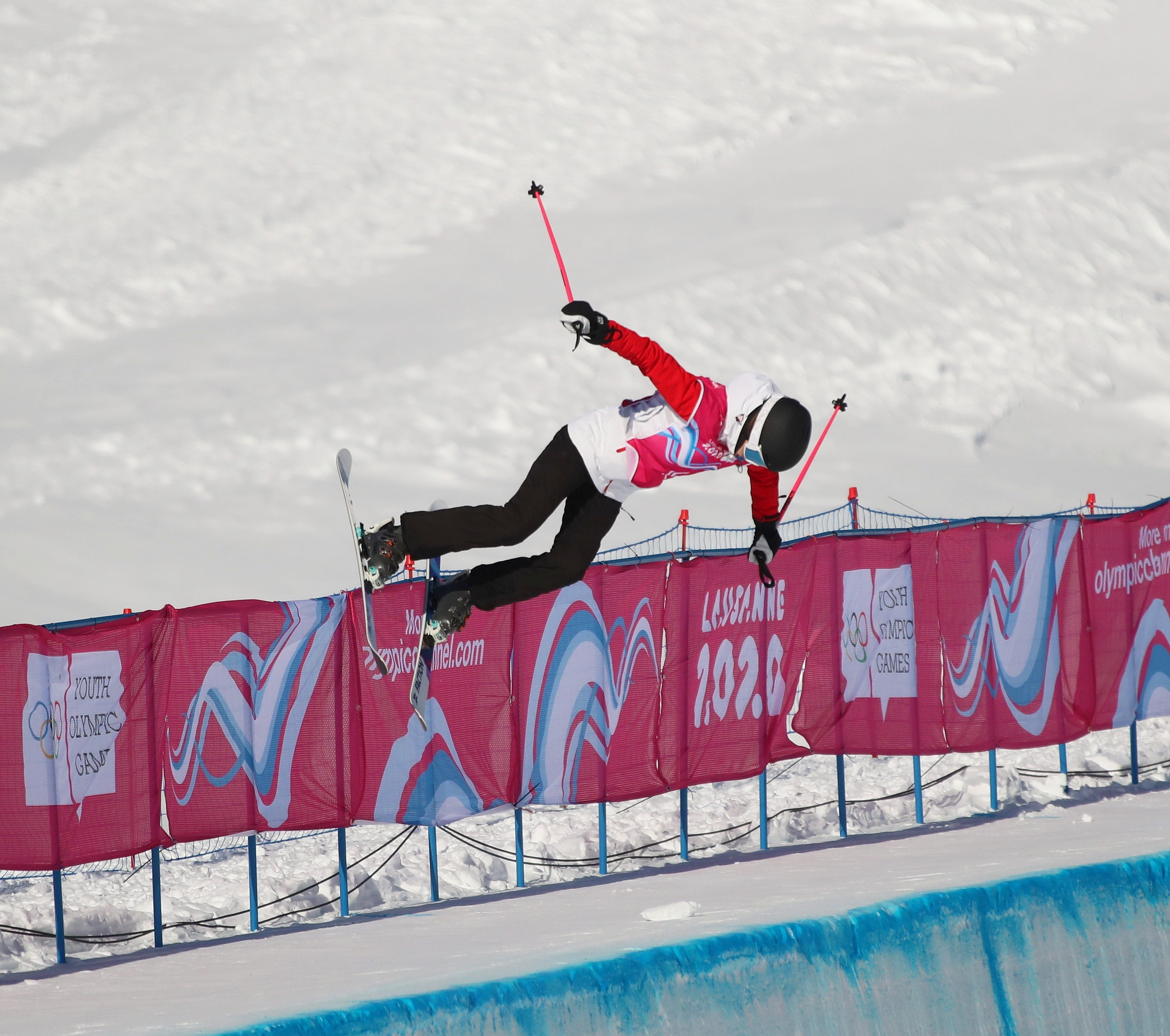
Gu's second run in the Women's Freeski Halfpipe Qualification at the 2020 Winter Youth Olympics

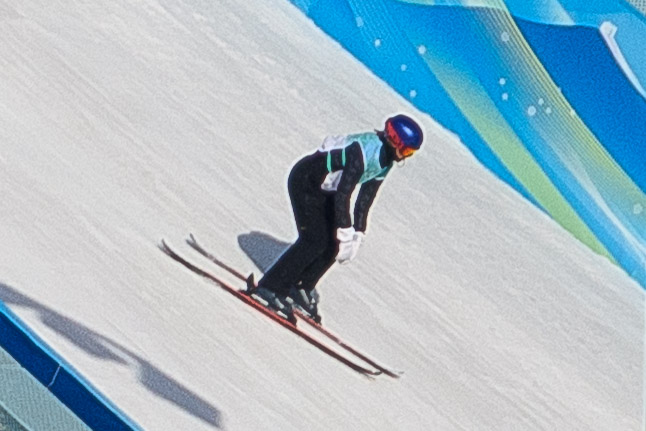
Gu's first run at Women's Freeski Big Air Qualification, 2022 Olympics

In 2021, Gu became the first woman to land a forward double cork 1440 in competition history.

=== Coaches and training ===
Gu's coaches have included Jamie Melton, head coach of the Chinese National Slopestyle and Big Air Training Team for the 2022 Winter Olympics, and Brad Prosser, who met Gu when she was ten. In 2018, he became the technical coach guide to the Chinese national team for the 2022 Winter Olympics. Her personal coach for the 2022 Olympics was Misra Noto Torniainen, the former coach of the Swiss freeski team. Torniainen coached Olympic medalists Sarah Höfflin and Mathilde Gremaud for the 2018 Winter Olympics.

In early 2025, the Beijing Municipal Sports Bureau released a public budget about allocating US$6.6 million for the training of Gu and fellow US-born athlete Zhu Yi ahead of the 2026 Milan games though later their names were removed from the document and articles on the topic were censored on several Chinese websites. The total payment from Beijing's sports bureau for Gu and Zhu was $14 million over the past three years prior to the 2026 games.

=== X Games ===
At the 2021 Winter X Games, Gu won a bronze medal in Big Air and two gold medals in SuperPipe and Slopestyle, becoming the first rookie to win a gold medal in Women's Ski SuperPipe, the first rookie to medal in three events, and the first athlete representing China to win a gold medal at the X Games.

Gu withdrew from the 2023 Winter X Games due to a heavy crash in training where she injured her knee.

At the 2024 Winter X Games, Gu won gold in SuperPipe despite injuring her right hip during the X Games Slopestyle training. She wrote "Pain is Temporary" on her hand, and showed it to the cameras during the finals. Due to the pain, she did not participate in Slopestyle.

=== World Championships ===
Gu competed at the FIS Freestyle Ski and Snowboarding World Championships 2021, winning two gold medals in Freeski Halfpipe and Freeski Slopestyle and a bronze medal in Freeski Big Air. Gu became the first freeskier to win two golds at the FIS Freeski World Championship. She competed without poles for the first time due to a broken hand, having fractured a finger and tearing the UCL in her thumb.

=== 2022 Winter Olympics ===
At the 2022 Winter Olympics in Beijing, Gu became the youngest gold medalist in freestyle skiing, winning the big air freestyle skiing event, the first to be held at the Olympics. Gu landed a double cork 1620, her first attempt in competition. She was the second woman to land the trick and the first woman to land a left-turn 1620; Tess Ledeux first successfully completed a double cork 1620 on 21 January 2022, at the X Games in Aspen, Colorado, Gu landed it again in her first run of the big air final at the 2022 Winter Olympics.

Gu won the silver medal in the slopestyle event. She won a second gold medal in the women's freeski halfpipe competition, becoming the first freestyle skier to win three medals at a Winter Olympics. She was awarded the Best Breakthrough Athlete and Best Female Action Sports Athlete ESPY Awards at the 2022 ESPY Awards.

=== World Cup results ===
Gu ended the 2021–22 World Cup season with a perfect record in women's halfpipe, taking her first career crystal globe and becoming the first freestyle skier to win four consecutive World Cup competitions. She won a second crystal globe during the same season, placing first in park and pipe overall.

All results are sourced from the International Ski Federation.

- 8 wins: 5 Halfpipe, 2 Slopestyle, 1 Big Air
- 12 podiums: 6 Halfpipe, 5 Slopestyle, 1 Big Air

| Representing | Season | Date | Location | Discipline | Place |
|---|---|---|---|---|---|
| United States | 2018–19 | January 12, 2019 | Font Romeu, France | Slopestyle | 2nd |
| United States | 2018–19 | January 27, 2019 | Seiser Alm, Italy | Slopestyle | 1st |
| China | 2019–20 | September 7, 2019 | Cardrona, New Zealand | Halfpipe | 2nd |
| China | 2019–20 | February 14, 2020 | Calgary, Canada | Halfpipe | 1st |
| China | 2019–20 | February 15, 2020 | Calgary, Canada | Slopestyle | 1st |
| China | 2020–21 | November 21, 2020 | Stubai, Austria | Slopestyle | 3rd |
| China | 2021–22 | December 4, 2021 | Steamboat, United States | Big Air | 1st |
| China | 2021–22 | December 10, 2021 | Copper Mountain, United States | Halfpipe | 1st |
| China | 2021–22 | December 30, 2021 | Calgary, Canada | Halfpipe | 1st |
| China | 2021–22 | January 1, 2022 | Calgary, Canada | Halfpipe | 1st |
| China | 2021–22 | January 8, 2022 | Mammoth Mountain, United States | Halfpipe | 1st |
| China | 2021–22 | January 9, 2022 | Mammoth Mountain, United States | Slopestyle | 2nd |

Results current through 1 February 2022.

=== 2026 Winter Olympics ===
At the 2026 Winter Olympics in Milan-Cortina, Eileen Gu competed in all three women's freestyle skiing disciplines: slopestyle, big air, and the freeski halfpipe, medaling in each. Gu secured silver medals in both slopestyle and big air, and won the gold medal in the halfpipe, defending her title from the 2022 Winter Olympics. Gu posted a top score of 94.75 in the halfpipe final, finishing ahead of compatriot Li Fanghui's score of 93.00 (silver) and Great Britain's Zoe Atkin's 92.50 (bronze).

With three medals won in Milan-Cortina and three from the 2022 Beijing Games, Eileen Gu's total of six Olympic gold or silver medals in six events made her the most decorated freestyle skier in Olympic history. Alongside Russian cross-country skier Lyubov Yegorova, Gu became the second athlete in history to earn either gold or silver in each of their first six individual Winter Olympic events.

== Results ==
=== Olympic Winter Games ===
| Year | Age | Slopestyle | Big Air | Halfpipe |
|---|---|---|---|---|
| (China) 2022 Beijing | 18 | 2 | 1 | 1 |
| (Italy) 2026 Milano Cortina | 22 | 2 | 2 | 1 |

=== World Championships ===
| Year | Age | Slopestyle | Big Air | Halfpipe |
|---|---|---|---|---|
| (United States) 2019 Deer Valley | 15 | —N/a | DNS | – |
| (United States) 2021 Aspen | 17 | 1 | 3 | 1 |

=== World Cup ===
==== Season standings ====
| Season | Age | Overall | Slopestyle | Big Air | Halfpipe |
|---|---|---|---|---|---|
| 2019 | 15 | 20 | 3rd place, bronze medalist(s) | – | – |
| 2020 | 16 | 25 | 12 | – | 5 |
| 2021 | 17 | 5 | 6 | – | 7 |
| 2022 | 18 | 1st place, gold medalist(s) | 15 | 4 | 1st place, gold medalist(s) |
| 2023 | 19 | 11 | – | – | 4 |
| 2024 | 20 | 2nd place, silver medalist(s) | 15 | – | 1st place, gold medalist(s) |
| 2025 | 21 | 3rd place, bronze medalist(s) | 15 | – | 3rd place, bronze medalist(s) |

== Nationality and citizenship ==
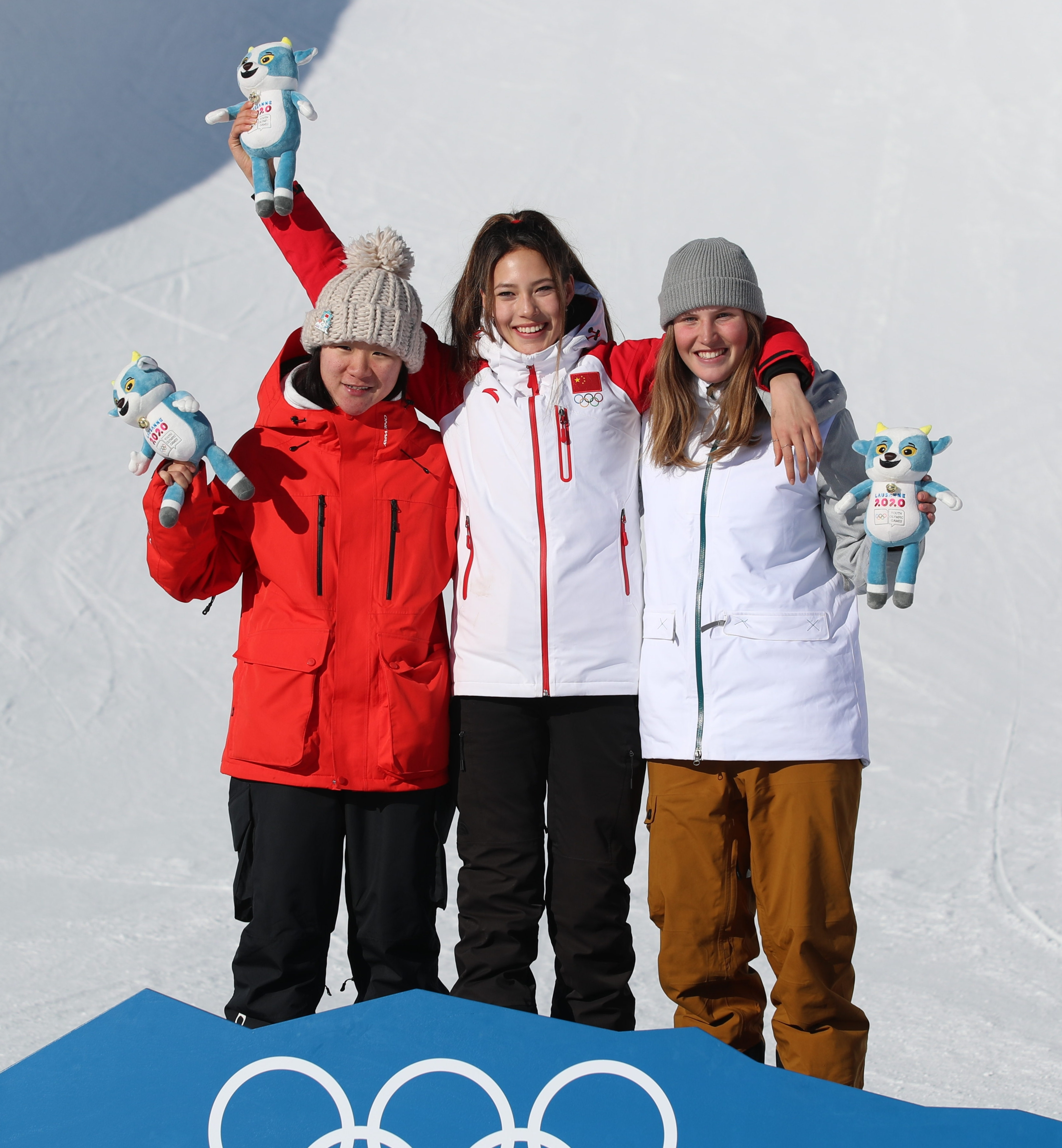
Mascot ceremony of freestyle skiing — women's halfpipe at the 2020 Winter Youth Olympics in Lausanne, Switzerland, on 20 January 2020. Left to right: Li Fanghui, Eileen Gu and Hanna Faulhaber

Gu competed for the United States at the 2018–19 FIS Freestyle Ski World Cup. She began competing for China in June 2019 after requesting a change of national affiliation with the International Ski Federation. Her goal was to compete for China in the 2022 Winter Olympics. She announced the change on Weibo and Instagram, stating that through skiing she hopes "to help inspire millions of young people" in China and "to unite people, promote common understanding, create communication, and forge friendships between nations".

There has been considerable controversy related to Gu's citizenship and nationality. The Chinese Consulate General in New York told BBC News that Gu would need to be naturalized or gain permanent residency status in China to compete for its team; in the same article, it was reported that China's Ministry of Justice in 2020 broadened rules for foreigners, allowing people who achieved international recognition in sport, science, culture and other fields to obtain permanent residency. The International Olympic Committee requires that any competitor in the Olympic Games must be a national of the country which they are representing. The Wall Street Journal reported in February 2026 that the Beijing Municipal Sports Bureau was set to pay Gu and another athlete a combined $6.6 million in training funds over a three-year period.

In an interview with ESPN in 2021, she said: "Since I was little, I've always said when I'm in the U.S., I'm American, but when I'm in China, I'm Chinese." In 2022, in an interview with the South China Morning Post, she said: "My appearance and the way I speak are completely American. No one can deny that I am American. When I go to China, no one can deny that I am Chinese because I speak fluent Chinese, am familiar with the culture here, and fully identify as Chinese." Following her gold medal victory in the halfpipe on 22 February 2026, Gu addressed the persistent scrutiny regarding her passports, noting that the perception of her decision is often affected by the geopolitical "rivalry" between the two nations.

== Political positions ==
Gu has spoken out in the United States against anti-Asian racism and publicly supported the Black Lives Matter movement and the right to legal access to abortion. Critics accused her of being disloyal for representing China and for declining to comment on Chinese government policies, including allegations of human rights abuses against Uyghurs. Gu has stated that she does not comment on issues she is not personally certain about, and explained that she needs to review evidence firsthand before forming a judgment to avoid becoming a "mouthpiece" for any agenda.

== Sponsorships, endorsements, and modeling career ==
As a "young American freestyle champion" at Nanshan Ski Resort, Gu had sponsorships in China at nine years old through connections with the resort's owner and China's ski industry. These included several Chinese sponsors, The North Face, and CCTV9.

Prior to the start of the 2022 Winter Olympics, Gu was the face of multiple brands in China. Gu has endorsed brands in China across sports, fashion, and banking. Some of her partnerships in China include Mengniu Dairy, Luckin Coffee, JD.com, China Mobile, People's Insurance Company of China, Bank of China, Anta Sports, and Bosideng.

Gu is represented by IMG Models. She has appeared on the covers of magazines such as the Chinese editions of Harper's Bazaar, Elle, Cosmopolitan, GQ, Marie Claire, V, L'Officiel, and Vogue. Gu has been featured in campaigns for Western luxury brands including Louis Vuitton and Tiffany & Co. and is a brand ambassador for IWC Schaffhausen and TCL Electronics. She is a Red Bull-sponsored athlete, a founding member of Victoria's Secret's VS Collective, and has an endorsement deal with Porsche.

It was reported that she earned over US$30 million in endorsements and advertising contracts in 2021 alone. According to media reports, her average fee per endorsement increased from $1 million in 2021 to $2 to $2.5 million in 2022. In 2023, Forbes listed Gu as the second-highest paid female athlete in the world. In 2024, she was the world's third-highest paid female athlete. In 2026, she was the fourth-highest paid female athlete in the world based on earnings of US$23.1 million in 2025.

== Personal life ==
Gu spent her childhood in California and spent summers in Beijing. Raised by her Chinese mother and grandmother in a single-parent household, she is fluent in both English and Mandarin Chinese and has spoken about her dual cultural identity: "When I'm in the US, I'm American. When I'm in China, I'm Chinese."

In 2002, a year before Gu was born, Gu Yan's sister Gu Ling (谷凌; Gǔ Líng) died in a car crash. Gu's mother decided to name her Àilíng (爱凌), literally translating to "Love Ling" and anglicized as "Eileen", in her sister's honor. In China, she uses the nickname 青蛙公主 (qīngwā gōngzhǔ; "Frog Princess") on her Chinese social media accounts. The nickname comes from a green helmet she once wore during competition.

Gu plays the piano as a hobby. In May 2022, Gu mentioned that she had converted to Buddhism.

Gu's grandmother, Feng Guozhen, died during the 2026 Olympics. Gu learned of her grandmother's passing shortly after winning the gold medal in the women's halfpipe and spoke emotionally about her influence on her life and career at her post‑event press conference.

Gu has stated that her broad purpose from international attention is to have "global beneficial impact" through her fashion and skiing. One estimate from the Chinese government is that more than 300 million people began participation in ice and snow sports since the 2022 Winter Olympics when Gu first competed.

== See also ==
- List of Olympic medalists in freestyle skiing
- List of Youth Olympic Games gold medalists who won Olympic gold medals
