= FIS Freestyle Ski and Snowboarding World Championships 2025 – Women's ski big air =

Women's ski big air at the FIS Freestyle Ski and Snowboarding World Championships 2025
- Location: St. Moritz, Switzerland
- Dates: 26 March (qualification); 29 March (final)
- Competitors: 24 from 13 nations
- Winning points: 176.75

Medalists
gold medal	Flora Tabanelli	Italy
silver medal	Sarah Höfflin	Switzerland
bronze medal	Anni Kärävä	Finland

The Women's ski big air competition at the FIS Freestyle Ski and Snowboarding World Championships 2025 was held on 26 and 29 March 2025.

== Qualification ==
The qualification was started on 26 March at 11:30. The eight best skiers qualified for the final.

Rank	Bib	Start order	Name	Country	Run 1	Run 2	Run 3	Total	Notes
1	9	8	Sarah Höfflin	Switzerland	86.75	82.25	DNI	169.00	Q
2	3	5	Megan Oldham	Canada	85.00	83.50	DNI	168.50	Q
3	2	9	Flora Tabanelli	Italy	79.75	62.50	88.00	167.75	Q
4	4	7	Liu Mengting	China	83.50	82.75	DNI	166.25	Q
5	5	1	Anni Kärävä	Finland	77.75	87.25	DNI	165.00	Q
6	19	19	Olivia Asselin	Canada	84.50	77.25	DNI	161.75	Q
7	16	11	Lara Wolf	Austria	19.75	81.75	78.25	160.00	Q
8	17	17	Han Linshan	China	87.50	70.50	71.25	158.75	Q
9	12	15	Sandra Eie	Norway	85.50	62.50	DNI	148.00	
10	20	12	Kateryna Kotsar	Ukraine	32.75	67.75	79.75	147.50	
11	10	4	Anouk Andraska	Switzerland	9.50	83.25	59.25	142.50	
12	13	20	Yang Ruyi	China	34.75	82.75	55.00	137.75	
13	25	22	Kiho Sugawara	Japan	63.25	20.25	65.00	128.25	
14	15	18	Grace Henderson	United States	59.00	65.00	62.25	127.25	
15	26	25	Kim Dumont-Zanella	France	14.00	58.50	62.50	121.00	
16	24	14	Yuna Koga	Japan	55.25	38.00	63.25	118.50	
17	8	10	Ruby Star Andrews	New Zealand	7.25	52.50	65.50	118.00	
18	23	24	Skye Clarke	Canada	14.25	61.50	54.00	115.50	
19	11	3	Marin Hamill	United States	49.75	54.25	49.50	103.75	
20	1	6	Mathilde Gremaud	Switzerland	75.00	12.50	15.50	90.50	
21	27	23	Madeleine Disbrowe	New Zealand	44.25	39.50	40.50	84.75	
22	21	13	Daisy Thomas	Australia	18.00	DNI	42.50	60.50	
23	18	16	Xiong Wenhui	China	31.00	DNI	13.00	44.00	
24	22	2	Abi Harrigan	Australia	16.00	10.50	12.50	28.50	
	28	21	Kate Gray	United States	Did not start				

== Final ==
The final was started on 29 March at 19:30.

Rank	Bib	Start order	Name	Country	Run 1	Run 2	Run 3	Total
1st place, gold medalist(s)	2	6	Flora Tabanelli	Italy	87.75	17.25	89.00	176.75
2nd place, silver medalist(s)	9	8	Sarah Höfflin	Switzerland	90.50	80.25	DNI	170.75
3rd place, bronze medalist(s)	5	4	Anni Kärävä	Finland	77.00	86.00	81.75	167.75
4	19	3	Olivia Asselin	Canada	82.00	80.50	85.00	167.00
5	3	7	Megan Oldham	Canada	85.75	76.25	DNI	162.00
6	4	5	Liu Mengting	China	81.50	79.75	DNI	161.25
7	16	2	Lara Wolf	Austria	80.00	72.75	75.00	155.00
8	17	1	Han Linshan	China	10.00	DNS	DNS	10.00
