= FIS Freestyle Ski and Snowboarding World Championships 2023 – Women's ski slopestyle =

Women's ski slopestyle at the FIS Freestyle Ski and Snowboarding World Championships 2023
- Location: Bakuriani, Georgia
- Dates: 27 February (qualification); 28 February
- Competitors: 18 from 11 nations
- Winning points: 87.95

Medalists
gold medal	Mathilde Gremaud	Switzerland
silver medal	Megan Oldham	Canada
bronze medal	Johanne Killi	Norway

The Women's ski slopestyle competition at the FIS Freestyle Ski and Snowboarding World Championships 2023 was held on 27 and 28 February 2023.

== Qualification ==
The qualification was started on 27 February at 10:00. The twelve best skiers qualified for the final.

Rank	Bib	Start order	Name	Country	Run 1	Run 2	Best	Notes
1	3	1	Mathilde Gremaud	Switzerland	80.33	87.55	87.55	Q
2	1	2	Johanne Killi	Norway	76.21	83.85	83.85	Q
3	8	5	Megan Oldham	Canada	77.55	79.65	79.65	Q
4	2	8	Tess Ledeux	France	75.71	73.66	75.71	Q
5	4	6	Sarah Höfflin	Switzerland	47.28	71.06	71.06	Q
6	10	3	Ruby Star Andrews	New Zealand	53.78	63.90	63.90	Q
7	6	4	Giulia Tanno	Switzerland	56.36	57.85	57.85	Q
8	17	13	Yuna Koga	Japan	53.25	51.38	53.25	Q
9	14	12	Anni Kärävä	Finland	45.53	48.30	48.30	Q
10	9	9	Sandra Eie	Norway	47.83	20.90	47.83	Q
11	13	14	Muriel Mohr	Germany	45.63	40.51	45.63	Q
12	11	7	Yang Ruyi	China	41.71	43.03	43.03	Q
13	16	19	Abi Harrigan	Australia	40.28	39.71	40.28	
14	12	11	Alia Delia Eichinger	Germany	39.16	24.08	39.16	
15	18	16	Kateryna Kotsar	Ukraine	17.40	33.61	33.61	
16	15	15	Anouk Andraska	Switzerland	31.96	29.95	31.96	
17	19	18	Liu Mengting	China	31.16	12.51	31.16	
18	20	17	Mabel Ashburn	Australia	29.13	6.05	29.13	
	7	10	Lara Wolf	Austria	Did not start			

== Final ==
The final was started on 28 February at 13:30.

Rank	Bib	Start order	Name	Country	Run 1	Run 2	Best
1st place, gold medalist(s)	3	12	Mathilde Gremaud	Switzerland	87.95	34.80	87.95
2nd place, silver medalist(s)	8	10	Megan Oldham	Canada	80.88	87.75	87.75
3rd place, bronze medalist(s)	1	11	Johanne Killi	Norway	84.71	9.76	84.71
4	4	8	Sarah Höfflin	Switzerland	65.61	23.78	65.61
5	14	4	Anni Kärävä	Finland	27.75	53.86	53.86
6	10	7	Ruby Star Andrews	New Zealand	52.06	26.76	52.06
7	9	3	Sandra Eie	Norway	13.95	47.40	47.40
8	11	1	Yang Ruyi	China	45.55	47.21	47.21
9	17	5	Yuna Koga	Japan	19.38	45.21	45.21
10	6	6	Giulia Tanno	Switzerland	44.75	21.66	44.75
11	13	2	Muriel Mohr	Germany	40.93	43.73	43.73
12	2	9	Tess Ledeux	France	29.51	30.18	30.18
