= Kokone Kondo =

Japanese freestyle skier (born 2003)

Personal information
- Born: 19 February 2003 (age 23) Hakuba, Nagano

Sport
- Country: Japan
- Sport: Freestyle skiing
- Events: Slopestyle; Big air

Kokone Kondo (近藤 心音, Kondo Kokone) (born 19 February 2003) is a Japanese freestyle skier.

== Career ==
Kondo competed in the FIS Freestyle Ski and Snowboarding World Championships 2021, where she placed 15th in women's ski big air, and 9th in women's ski slopestyle.

=== Olympics ===
She withdrew from the big air event and slopestyle event at the 2022 Winter Olympics after sustaining an injury during practice.

Four years later at the 2026 Winter Olympics she met the same fate, as she injured her left knee in a practice crash two days before her first scheduled competition. She once again had to withdraw from both the slopestyle and big air events. Afterwards she publicly complained about abuse on social media, where she received messages calling for her to quit, due to her alleged injury proneness.

She announced her retirement from the sport on 8 June 2026.
