= Lara Wolf =

Austrian freestyle skier (born 2000)

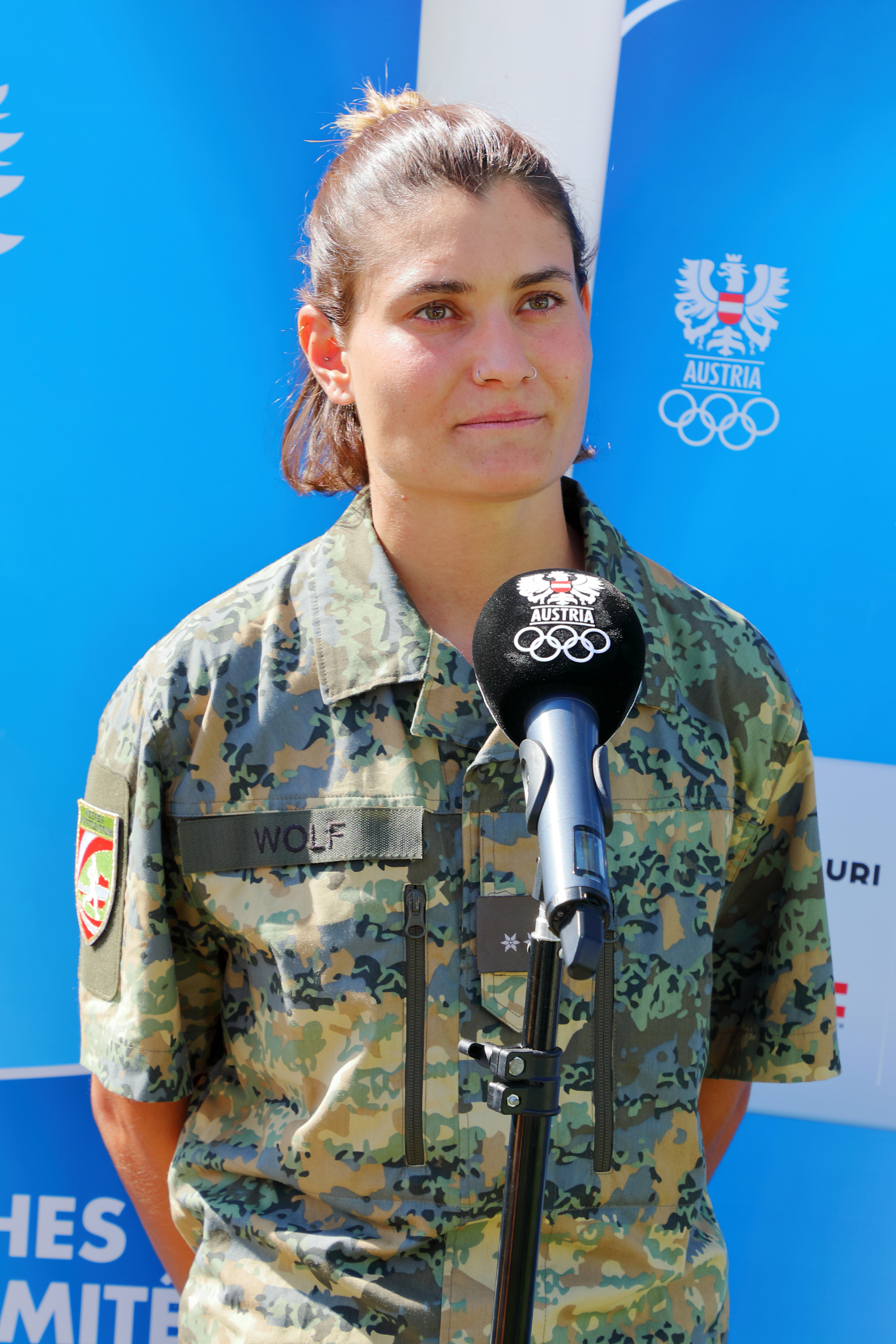
- Wolf in 2025

Personal information
- Born: 23 March 2000 (age 26) Kappl, Austria
- Height: 168 cm (5 ft 6 in)

Sport
- Country: Austria
- Sport: Freestyle skiing
- Event: Slopestyle
Medal record
Women's freestyle skiing
Representing Austria
World Championships
| Silver medal – second place | 2025 Engadin | Slopestyle |
Winter Youth Olympics
| Bronze medal – third place | 2016 Lillehammer | Halfpipe |

Lara Wolf (born 23 March 2000) is an Austrian freestyle skier. She represented Austria at the 2018, 2022, and 2026 Winter Olympics.

== Results ==
=== Olympic Winter Games ===
| Year | Age | Slopestyle | Big Air |
|---|---|---|---|
| (South Korea) 2018 Pyeongchang | 17 | 16 | —N/a |
| (China) 2022 Beijing | 21 | 14 | 21 |
| (Italy) 2026 Milano Cortina | 25 | 9 | 5 |

=== World Championships ===
| Year | Age | Slopestyle | Big Air |
|---|---|---|---|
| (Spain) 2017 Sierra Nevada | 16 | 4 | —N/a |
| (United States) 2019 Deer Valley | 18 | —N/a | 10 |
| (United States) 2021 Aspen | 20 | 7 | 7 |
| (Georgia (country)) 2023 Bakuriani | 22 | DNS | – |
| (Switzerland) 2025 Engadin | 24 | 2 | 7 |
