= Sarah Höfflin =

Swiss freestyle skier (born 1991)

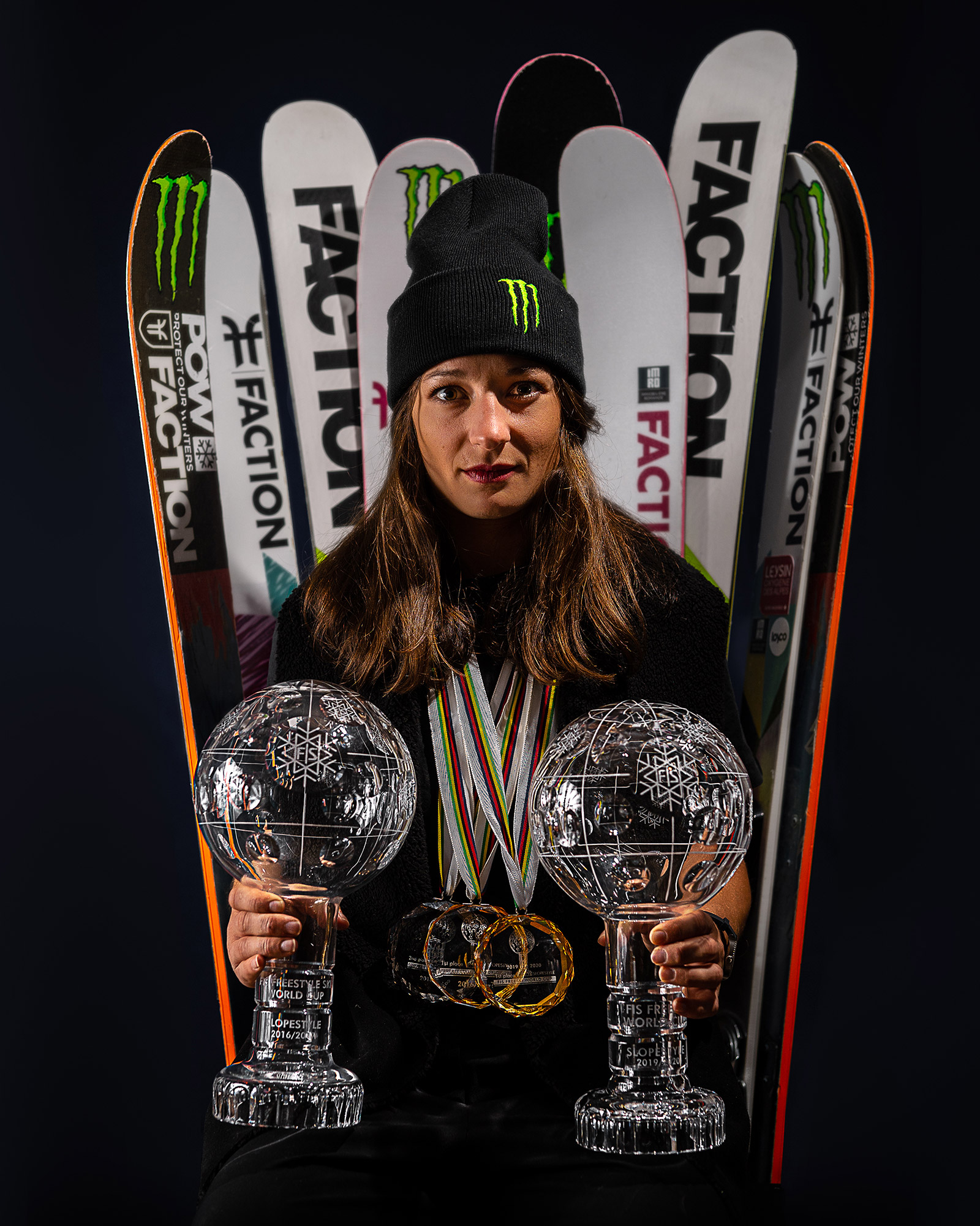

Personal information
- Born: 8 January 1991 (age 35) Geneva

Sport
- Country: Switzerland
- Sport: Freestyle skiing
- Event(s): Slopestyle, Big air
Medal record
Women's freestyle skiing
Representing Switzerland
Olympic Games
| Gold medal – first place | 2018 Pyeongchang | Slopestyle |
World Championships
| Silver medal – second place | 2025 Engadin | Big air |
Winter X Games
| Gold medal – first place | 2018 Aspen | Big air |
| Silver medal – second place | 2019 Aspen | Slopestyle |
| Silver medal – second place | 2020 Aspen | Slopestyle |
| Bronze medal – third place | 2020 Aspen | Big air |

Sarah Höfflin (born 8 January 1991) is an Olympic Swiss freestyle skier. She won a gold medal in big air at Winter X Games XXII, and won gold in slopestyle at the 2018 Winter Olympics in Pyeongchang, South Korea.

== Early life and education ==
Höfflin lived in the UK between the ages of 12 and 22, living in Tewkesbury, where she attended Tewkesbury School, before attending Cardiff University, where she graduated with a degree in neuroscience. She was a late starter as a freestyle skier, only taking up the sport in her early 20s when competing at British Universities' Snowsports Council competitions after leaving university and returning to Switzerland.

== Results ==
=== Olympic Winter Games ===
| Year | Age | Slopestyle | Big Air |
|---|---|---|---|
| (South Korea) 2018 Pyeongchang | 27 | 1 | —N/a |
| (China) 2022 Beijing | 31 | 20 | 6 |
| (Italy) 2026 Milano Cortina | 35 | 13 | 27 |

=== World Championships ===
| Year | Age | Slopestyle | Big Air |
|---|---|---|---|
| (Spain) 2017 Sierra Nevada | 26 | 4 | —N/a |
| (United States) 2019 Deer Valley | 28 | —N/a | 4 |
| (United States) 2021 Aspen | 30 | DNS | 8 |
| (Georgia (country)) 2023 Bakuriani | 32 | 4 | 15 |
| (Switzerland) 2025 Engadin | 34 | 16 | 2 |
