= France at the 2022 Winter Olympics =

- Flag of France
- IOC code: FRA
- NOC: French National Olympic and Sports Committee
- Website: www.franceolympique.com (in French)

in Beijing, China 4–20 February 2022
- Competitors: 86 (50 men and 36 women) in 10 sports
- Flag bearers (opening): Tessa Worley; Kevin Rolland
- Flag bearer (closing): Quentin Fillon Maillet
- Medals Ranked 10th: Gold 5 Silver 7 Bronze 2 Total 14

Winter Olympics appearances (overview)
- 1924; 1928; 1932; 1936; 1948; 1952; 1956; 1960; 1964; 1968; 1972; 1976; 1980; 1984; 1988; 1992; 1994; 1998; 2002; 2006; 2010; 2014; 2018; 2022; 2026

France competed at the 2022 Winter Olympics in Beijing, China, from 4 to 20 February 2022.

On January 26, 2022, freestyle skier Kevin Rolland and alpine skier Tessa Worley were announced as the French flagbearers during the opening ceremony. Biathlete Quentin Fillon Maillet was the flagbearer during the closing ceremony.

== Medalists ==
The following French competitors won medals at the games. In the discipline sections below, the medalists' names are bolded.

Medal	Name	Sport	Event	Date
Gold	Quentin Fillon Maillet	Biathlon	Individual	8 February
Gold	Quentin Fillon Maillet	Biathlon	Pursuit	13 February
Gold	Gabriella Papadakis; Guillaume Cizeron	Figure skating	Ice dance	14 February
Gold	Clément Noël	Alpine skiing	Men's slalom	16 February
Gold	Justine Braisaz-Bouchet	Biathlon	Mass start	18 February
Silver	Anaïs Chevalier-Bouchet; Quentin Fillon Maillet; Émilien Jacquelin; Julia Simon	Biathlon	Mixed relay	5 February
Silver	Johan Clarey	Alpine skiing	Downhill	7 February
Silver	Anaïs Chevalier-Bouchet	Biathlon	Individual	7 February
Silver	Tess Ledeux	Freestyle skiing	Big air	8 February
Silver	Chloé Trespeuch	Snowboarding	Women's snowboard cross	9 February
Silver	Quentin Fillon Maillet	Biathlon	Sprint	12 February
Silver	Fabien Claude; Émilien Jacquelin; Simon Desthieux; Quentin Fillon Maillet	Biathlon	Relay	15 February
Bronze	Mathieu Faivre	Alpine skiing	Giant slalom	13 February
Bronze	Richard Jouve; Hugo Lapalus; Clément Parisse; Maurice Manificat	Cross-country skiing	4 × 10 kilometre relay	13 February

**Medals by sport**
**Sport**	1st place, gold medalist(s)	2nd place, silver medalist(s)	3rd place, bronze medalist(s)	Total
Alpine skiing	1	1	1	3
Biathlon	3	4	0	7
Cross-country skiing	0	0	1	1
Figure Skating	1	0	0	1
Freestyle Skiing	0	1	0	1
Snowboarding	0	1	0	1
**Total**	**5**	**7**	**2**	**14**

**Medals by date**
**Day**	**Date**	1st place, gold medalist(s)	2nd place, silver medalist(s)	3rd place, bronze medalist(s)	Total
Day 1	February 5	0	1	0	1
Day 2	February 6	0	0	0	0
Day 3	February 7	0	2	0	2
Day 4	February 8	1	1	0	2
Day 5	February 9	0	1	0	1
Day 6	February 10	0	0	0	0
Day 7	February 11	0	0	0	0
Day 8	February 12	0	1	0	1
Day 9	February 13	1	0	2	3
Day 10	February 14	1	0	0	1
Day 11	February 15	0	1	0	1
Day 12	February 16	1	0	0	1
Day 13	February 17	0	0	0	0
Day 14	February 18	1	0	0	1
Day 15	February 19	0	0	0	0
Day 16	February 20	0	0	0	0
	Total	5	7	2	14

**Multiple medalists**
**Name**	**Sport**	1st place, gold medalist(s)	2nd place, silver medalist(s)	3rd place, bronze medalist(s)	**Total**
Quentin Fillon Maillet	Biathlon	2	3	0	**5**
Anaïs Chevalier-Bouchet	Biathlon	0	2	0	**2**

== Competitors ==
The following is a list of the number of competitors participating at the Games per sport/discipline.

Sport	Men	Women	Total
Alpine skiing	10	8	18
Biathlon	6	6	12
Bobsleigh	4	2	6
Cross-country skiing	8	5	13
Figure skating	3	1	4
Freestyle skiing	8	5	13
Nordic combined	5	—N/a	5
Short track speed skating	2	2	4
Ski jumping	0	2	2
Snowboarding	4	5	9
Total	50	36	86

== Alpine skiing ==
By meeting the basic qualification standards, France has qualified at least one male and one female alpine skier.

CNOSF announced the 5 men and 7 women participating on 19 January 2022. One more woman and four more men were announced on 23 January 2022. One more man was announced on 24 January 2022 following a reallocation of quota by the FIS, Maxence Muzaton joins the French delegation in alpine skiing.

Men

Athlete	Event	Run 1		Run 2		Total	
Athlete	Event	Time	Rank	Time	Rank	Time	Rank
Alexis Pinturault	Combined	1:45:04	11	DNF			
Matthieu Bailet	Downhill	—N/a				1:45.23	27
Johan Clarey	Downhill	—N/a				1:42:79	2nd place, silver medalist(s)
Blaise Giezendanner	Downhill	—N/a				1:45:00	26
Maxence Muzaton	Downhill	—N/a				1:43:82	11
Mathieu Faivre	Giant slalom	1:03.01	3	1:07.68	13	2:10.69	3rd place, bronze medalist(s)
Thibaut Favrot	Giant slalom	1:03.12	5	1:07.92	14	2:11.04	=5
Cyprien Sarrazin	Giant slalom	DNF		did not advance			
Alexis Pinturault	Giant slalom	1:03.99	11	1:07.05	4	2:11.04	=5
Clément Noël	Slalom	54.30	6	49.79	1	1:44.09	1st place, gold medalist(s)
Alexis Pinturault	Slalom	55.12	15	51.03	20	1:46.15	16
Nils Allègre	Super-G	—N/a				1:23.24	26
Matthieu Bailet	Super-G	—N/a				DNF	
Blaise Giezendanner	Super-G	—N/a				1:21.26	9
Alexis Pinturault	Super-G	—N/a				1:21.36	11

Women

Athlete	Event	Run 1		Run 2		Total	
Athlete	Event	Time	Rank	Time	Rank	Time	Rank
Laura Gauché	Combined	1:34.08	17	55.96	6	2:30.04	8
Romane Miradoli	Combined	1:32.95	4	DNF			
Camille Cerutti	Downhill	—N/a				DNF	
Laura Gauché	Downhill	—N/a				1:33.47	10
Tiffany Gauthier	Downhill	—N/a				DNF	
Romane Miradoli	Downhill	—N/a				1:33.93	13
Clara Direz	Giant slalom	1:00.24	23	59.09	19	1:59.33	19
Coralie Frasse-Sombet	Giant slalom	1:00.91	26	57.69	3	1:58.60	17
Tessa Worley	Giant slalom	58.93	7	DNF			
Nastasia Noens	Slalom	54.68	24	53.18	15	1:47.86	19
Laura Gauché	Super-G	—N/a				1:14.87	16
Tiffany Gauthier	Super-G	—N/a				1:16.20	28
Romane Miradoli	Super-G	—N/a				1:14.41	11
Tessa Worley	Super-G	—N/a				1:15.30	19

Mixed

Athlete	Event	Round of 16	Quarterfinals	Semifinals	Final / BM	
Athlete	Event	Opposition Result	Opposition Result	Opposition Result	Opposition Result	Rank
Clara Direz; Coralie Frasse Sombet; Tessa Worley; Mathieu Faivre; Thibaut Favrot; Alexis Pinturault	Team	Czech Republic; W 3–1	Norway; L 2–2*	Did not advance		5

== Biathlon ==
Based on their Nations Cup rankings in the 2020–21 Biathlon World Cup and 2021–22 Biathlon World Cup, France has qualified a team of 6 men and 6 women.

CNOSF announced the 6 men and 6 women participating on 19 January 2022.

Men

Athlete	Event	Time	Misses	Rank
Fabien Claude	Individual	50:25.5	2 (1+1+0+0)	9
Simon Desthieux	Individual	51:46.8	3 (1+2+0+0)	17
Quentin Fillon Maillet	Individual	48:47.4	2 (0+1+1+0)	1st place, gold medalist(s)
Émilien Jacquelin	Individual	56:31.4	7 (0+3+2+2)	72
Fabien Claude	Mass start	42:49.8	5 (1+2+1+1)	26
Simon Desthieux	Mass start	41:11.4	5 (1+2+1+1)	16
Quentin Fillon Maillet	Mass start	39:40.0	5 (1+1+0+3)	4
Émilien Jacquelin	Mass start	42:08.7	5 (2+1+0+2)	22
Fabien Claude	Pursuit	42:54.5	7 (3+1+1+2)	16
Simon Desthieux	Pursuit	41:54.7	3 (2+0+0+1)	7
Quentin Fillon Maillet	Pursuit	39:07.5	0 (0+0+0+0)	1st place, gold medalist(s)
Émilien Jacquelin	Pursuit	42:13.7	6 (2+3+0+1)	9
Fabien Claude	Sprint	25:41.6	3 (1+2)	21
Simon Desthieux	Sprint	25:45.0	2 (0+2)	24
Quentin Fillon Maillet	Sprint	24:25.9	1 (1+0)	2nd place, silver medalist(s)
Émilien Jacquelin	Sprint	25:06.3	2 (1+1)	9
Fabien Claude; Émilien Jacquelin; Simon Desthieux; Quentin Fillon Maillet	Team relay	1:20:17.6	0+9	2nd place, silver medalist(s)

Women

Athlete	Event	Time	Misses	Rank
Anaïs Bescond	Individual	48:26.0	4 (2+1+0+1)	30
Justine Braisaz-Bouchet	Individual	49:10.1	5 (0+2+2+1)	40
Anaïs Chevalier-Bouchet	Individual	44:22.1	1 (0+0+0+1)	2nd place, silver medalist(s)
Julia Simon	Individual	47:09.1	4 (0+0+1+3)	21
Anaïs Bescond	Mass start	46:02.3	10 (0+2+3+5)	29
Justine Braisaz-Bouchet	Mass start	40:18.0	4 (2+1+0+1)	1st place, gold medalist(s)
Anaïs Chevalier-Bouchet	Mass start	43:29.7	5 (2+0+2+1)	19
Julia Simon	Mass start	41:40.6	6 (0+1+3+2)	6
Anaïs Bescond	Pursuit	38:46.4	5 (2+0+1+2)	27
Justine Braisaz-Bouchet	Pursuit	DNS		
Julia Simon	Pursuit	37:05.2	2 (0+1+1+0)	8
Anaïs Bescond	Sprint	21:53.1	1 (1+0)	9
Justine Braisaz-Bouchet	Sprint	23:18.4	3 (1+2)	48
Anaïs Chevalier-Bouchet	Sprint	24:02.0	4 (1+3)	68
Julia Simon	Sprint	22:40.3	3 (1+2)	29
Anaïs Bescond; Justine Braisaz-Bouchet; Anaïs Chevalier-Bouchet; Julia Simon	Team relay	1:13:16.9	2+10	6

Mixed

Athlete	Event	Time	Misses	Rank
Anaïs Chevalier-Bouchet; Quentin Fillon-Maillet; Émilien Jacquelin; Julia Simon	Relay	1:06:46.5	3+11	2nd place, silver medalist(s)

== Bobsleigh ==
Based on their rankings in the 2021–22 Bobsleigh World Cup, France qualified 4 sleds. CNOSF announced the competing athletes on 19 January 2022.

Men

Athlete	Event	Run 1		Run 2		Run 3		Run 4		Total	
Athlete	Event	Time	Rank	Time	Rank	Time	Rank	Time	Rank	Time	Rank
Romain Heinrich*; Dorian Hauterville	Two-man	59.93	16	1:00.04	11	59.92	12	1:00.05	10	3:59.94	12
Romain Heinrich*; Dorian Hauterville; Jérôme Laporal; Lionel Lefebvre; Thomas Delmestre	Four-man	59.29	15	59.53	12	59.29	13	1:00.06	19	3:58.17	19

Women

Athlete	Event	Run 1		Run 2		Run 3		Run 4		Total	
Athlete	Event	Time	Rank	Time	Rank	Time	Rank	Time	Rank	Time	Rank
Margot Boch	Monobob	1:05.77	14	1:05.51	4	1:06.01	12	1:06.53	16	4:23.82	11
Margot Boch*; Carla Sénéchal; Sandie Clair	Two-woman	1:01.90	12	1:02.32	17	1:02.20	15	1:01.97	10	4:08.39	13

* – Denotes the driver of each sled
Italic – Denotes a substitute athlete

== Cross-country skiing ==
By meeting the basic qualification standards, France has qualified at least one male and one female cross-country skier.

CNOSF announced the 8 men and 5 women participating on 19 January 2022.

Distance
Men

Athlete	Event	Classical		Freestyle		Final		
Athlete	Event	Time	Rank	Time	Rank	Time	Deficit	Rank
Richard Jouve	15 km classical	—N/a				41:56.6	+4:01.8	49
Hugo Lapalus	15 km classical	—N/a				39:09.6	+1:14.8	7
Maurice Manificat	15 km classical	—N/a				39:49.7	+1:54.9	12
Hugo Lapalus	30 km skiathlon	40:25.2	9	DNF				-
Jules Lapierre	30 km skiathlon	41:04.5	13	38:45.3	10	1:20:21.8	+4:12.0	14
Maurice Manificat	30 km skiathlon	41:53.9	33	38:49.4	12	1:21:17.5	+5:07.7	23
Clément Parisse	30 km skiathlon	41:16.0	17	38:21.7	5	1:20:07.0	+3:57.2	10
Adrien Backscheider	50 km freestyle	—N/a				1:16:16.6	+4:43.9	34
Jules Lapierre	50 km freestyle	—N/a				1:13:50.3	+2:17.6	15
Maurice Manificat	50 km freestyle	—N/a				1:12:30.3	+57.6	10
Clément Parisse	50 km freestyle	—N/a				1:12:01.5	+28.8	7
Richard Jouve; Hugo Lapalus; Clément Parisse; Maurice Manificat	4 x 10 km relay	—N/a				1:56:07.1	+1:16.4	3rd place, bronze medalist(s)

Women

Athlete	Event	Classical		Freestyle		Final		
Athlete	Event	Time	Rank	Time	Rank	Time	Deficit	Rank
Coralie Bentz	10 km classical	—N/a				31:17.6	+3:11.3	40
Mélissa Gal	10 km classical	—N/a				31:25.7	+3:19.4	41
Coralie Bentz	15 km skiathlon	25:05.8	40	23:45.9	36	49:34.4	5:20.7	38
Delphine Claudel	15 km skiathlon	23:28.2	12	21:25.6	6	45:31.5	1:17.8	9
Coralie Bentz	Women's 30 km freestyle	—N/a				1:38:08.2	+13:14.2	44
Delphine Claudel	Women's 30 km freestyle	—N/a				1:27:34.0	+2:40.0	7
Flora Dolci	Women's 30 km freestyle	—N/a				1:32:04.7	+7:10.7	24
Léna Quintin; Delphine Claudel; Flora Dolci; Mélissa Gal	4 x 5 km relay	—N/a				59:03.9	+5:22.9	12

Sprint

Athlete	Event	Qualification		Quarterfinal		Semifinal		Final	
Athlete	Event	Time	Rank	Time	Rank	Time	Rank	Time	Rank
Lucas Chanavat	Men's individual	2:45.03	1 Q	2:53.43	2 Q	2:52.92	5	Did not advance	9
Renaud Jay	Men's individual	2:51.86	16 Q	3:35.80	6	Did not advance			27
Richard Jouve	Men's individual	2:47.93	4 Q	2:57.92	1 Q	2:52.31	3	Did not advance	7
Richard Jouve; Hugo Lapalus	Men's team	—N/a				20:17.36	2 Q	19:58.37	7
Léna Quintin	Women's individual	3:24.19	31	Did not advance					
Mélissa Gal; Léna Quintin	Women's team	—N/a				23:26.28	5 LL	24:04.92	10

== Figure skating ==
In the 2021 World Figure Skating Championships in Stockholm, Sweden, France secured one quota in both the men's and ice dance competitions. Second quota for men's was secured at the 2021 CS Nebelhorn Trophy.

Individual

Athlete	Event	SP		FS		Total	
Athlete	Event	Points	Rank	Points	Rank	Points	Rank
Kévin Aymoz	Men's singles	93.00	10 Q	161.80	15	254.80	12
Adam Siao Him Fa	Men's singles	86.74	14 Q	163.41	13	250.15	14

Mixed

Athlete	Event	RD		FD		Total	
Athlete	Event	Points	Rank	Points	Rank	Points	Rank
Gabriella Papadakis; Guillaume Cizeron	Ice dance	90.83 WR	1 Q	136.15	1	226.98 WR	1st place, gold medalist(s)

== Freestyle skiing ==
CNOSF announced the 8 men and 5 women competing on 19 January 2022.

Freeski
Men

Athlete	Event	Qualification					Final				
Athlete	Event	Run 1	Run 2	Run 3	Best/Total	Rank	Run 1	Run 2	Run 3	Best/Total	Rank
Antoine Adelisse	Big air	79.50	~~66.00~~	83.75	163.25	15	Did not advance				
Antoine Adelisse	Slopestyle	DNS					Did not advance				
Kevin Rolland	Halfpipe	~~65.25~~	75.25	—N/a	75.25	10	~~54.75~~	~~77.25~~	79.25	79.25	6

Women

Athlete	Event	Qualification					Final				
Athlete	Event	Run 1	Run 2	Run 3	Best/Total	Rank	Run 1	Run 2	Run 3	Best/Total	Rank
Tess Ledeux	Big air	90.50	80.50	~~20.00~~	171.00	2	94.50	93.00	~~73.25~~	187.50	2nd place, silver medalist(s)
Tess Ledeux	Slopestyle	22.13	68.13	—N/a	68.13	9 Q	72.91	23.08	28.81	72.91	7

Moguls
Men

Athlete	Event	Qualification								Final											
Athlete	Event	Run 1				Run 2				Run 1				Run 2				Run 3			
Athlete	Event	Time	Points	Total	Rank	Time	Points	Total	Rank	Time	Points	Total	Rank	Time	Points	Total	Rank	Time	Points	Total	Rank
Benjamin Cavet	Moguls	23.52	61.42	78.40	3 QF	Bye				24.26	61.79	77.80	6 Q	24.48	63.10	78.82	4 Q	24.60	63.88	79.44	4
Sacha Theocharis	Moguls	24.96	55.41	70.50	22	25.56	61.12	75.41	8 QF	24.65	61.10	76.59	11 Q	24.70	58.97	73.40	11	Did not advance			

Women

Athlete	Event	Qualification								Final											
Athlete	Event	Run 1				Run 2				Run 1				Run 2				Run 3			
Athlete	Event	Time	Points	Total	Rank	Time	Points	Total	Rank	Time	Points	Total	Rank	Time	Points	Total	Rank	Time	Points	Total	Rank
Camille Cabrol	Moguls	30.61	49.47	62.97	20	30.75	54.41	67.76	10 QF	30.03	56.15	70.31	18	Did not advance							
Perrine Laffont	Moguls	27.81	64.45	81.11	2 QF	Bye				27.73	63.11	79.86	3 Q	27.93	61.10	77.62	5 Q	28.04	60.96	77.36	4

Ski cross
Men

Athlete	Event	Seeding		1/8 final	Quarterfinal	Semifinal	Final	
Athlete	Event	Time	Rank	Position	Position	Position	Position	Rank
Jean-Frédéric Chapuis	Ski cross	1:13.20	16	3	Did not advance			20
Bastien Midol	Ski cross	1:12.55	9	2 Q	3	Did not advance		11
François Place	Ski cross	1:12.83	11	1 Q	2 Q	4 SF	4	8
Térence Tchiknavorian	Ski cross	1:12.85	12	3	Did not advance			18

Women

Athlete	Event	Seeding		1/8 final	Quarterfinal	Semifinal	Final	
Athlete	Event	Time	Rank	Position	Position	Position	Position	Rank
Alizée Baron	Ski cross	DNS		DNS	Did not advance			
Jade Grillet-Aubert	Ski cross	1:19.54	16	2 Q	4	Did not advance		14

== Nordic combined ==
CNOSF announced the 5 athletes participating on 19 January 2022.

Athlete	Event	Ski jumping			Cross-country		Total	
Athlete	Event	Distance	Points	Rank	Time	Rank	Time	Rank
Mattéo Baud	Large hill/10 km	127.5	103.7	16	26:54.4	20	29:18.4	21
Gaël Blondeau	Large hill/10 km	103.5	59.3	41	27:20.8	26	32:42.8	40
Antoine Gérard	Large hill/10 km	129.5	101.9	18	26:20.4	11	28:52.4	14
Laurent Mühlethaler	Large hill/10 km	123.5	96.9	24	27:27.6	27	30:19.6	26
Mattéo Baud	Normal hill/10 km	97.5	111.3	12	25:42.0	25	27:09.0	18
Gaël Blondeau	Normal hill/10 km	91.0	91.3	30	25:56.3	27	28:43.3	31
Antoine Gérard	Normal hill/10 km	DSQ			Did not advance			
Laurent Mühlethaler	Normal hill/10 km	94.0	102.4	21	26:24.6	31	28:26.6	28
Mattéo Baud; Gaël Blondeau; Antoine Gérard; Laurent Mühlethaler	Team large hill/4 × 5 km	493.5	410.0	5	51:33.1	6	53:00.1	5

== Short track speed skating ==
France has qualified two male and two female short track speed skaters as well as the mixed relay.

CNOSF announced the 4 athletes participating on 19 January 2022.

Men

Athlete	Event	Heat		Quarterfinal		Semifinal		Final	
Athlete	Event	Time	Rank	Time	Rank	Time	Rank	Time	Rank
Quentin Fercoq	500 m	40.548	4	Did not advance					25
Quentin Fercoq	1000 m	1:23.917	2 Q	1:24.411	3	Did not advance			11
Quentin Fercoq	1500 m	—N/a		2:15.347	4	Did not advance			23
Sébastien Lepape	500 m	42.081	2 Q	46.814	5	Did not advance			20
Sébastien Lepape	1000 m	1:26.069	4	Did not advance					26
Sébastien Lepape	1500 m	—N/a		2:41.547	5	Did not advance			29

Women

Athlete	Event	Heat		Quarterfinal		Semifinal		Final	
Athlete	Event	Time	Rank	Time	Rank	Time	Rank	Time	Rank
Gwendoline Daudet	500 m	45.515	4	Did not advance					29
Gwendoline Daudet	1000 m	1:31.734	3	Did not advance					23
Gwendoline Daudet	1500 m	—N/a		2:23.607	6	Did not advance			30
Tifany Huot-Marchand	500 m	54.758	4	Did not advance					30
Tifany Huot-Marchand	1000 m	PEN		Did not advance					
Tifany Huot-Marchand	1500 m	—N/a		2:23.784	6	Did not advance			31

Mixed

Athlete	Event	Quarterfinal		Semifinal		Final	
Athlete	Event	Time	Rank	Time	Rank	Time	Rank
Quentin Fercoq; Sébastien Lepape; Gwendoline Daudet; Tifany Huot-Marchand	2000 m relay	2:51.221	4	Did not advance			12

== Ski jumping ==
CNOSF announced 2 women participating on 19 January 2022.

Women

Athlete	Event	First round			Final			Total	
Athlete	Event	Distance	Points	Rank	Distance	Points	Rank	Points	Rank
Julia Clair	Normal hill	64.0	43.3	34	Did not advance			43.3	34
Joséphine Pagnier	Normal hill	96.0	102.1	7 Q	78.5	77.4	22	179.5	11

== Snowboarding ==
CNOSF announced the 4 men and 5 women participating on 19 January 2022.

Freestyle

Athlete	Event	Qualification					Final				
Athlete	Event	Run 1	Run 2	Run 3	Best	Rank	Run 1	Run 2	Run 3	Best	Rank
Liam Tourki	Men's halfpipe	25.50	11.50	—N/a	25.50	20	Did not advance				
Lucile Lefevre	Women's big air	~~19.00~~	~~15.00~~	20.00	20.00	29	Did not advance				
Lucile Lefevre	Women's slopestyle	23.16	21.98	—N/a	23.16	27	did not advance				

Snowboard cross

Athlete	Event	Seeding		1/8 final	Quarterfinal	Semifinal	Final	
Athlete	Event	Time	Rank	Position	Position	Position	Position	Rank
Loan Bozzolo	Men's	1:19.23	24	2 Q	3	Did not advance		11
Léo Le Blé Jaques	Men's	1:21.06	30	2 Q	3	Did not advance		12
Merlin Surget	Men's	1:18.64	16	2 Q	2 Q	3 FB	1	5
Julia Pereira de Sousa Mabileau	Women's	1:23.89	6	1 Q	2 Q	DNF FB	1	5
Manon Petit-Lenoir	Women's	1:24.96	12	4	Did not advance			26
Alexia Queyrel	Women's	1:25.17	21	3	Did not advance			21
Chloé Trespeuch	Women's	1:24.27	8	1 Q	2 Q	2 FA	2	2nd place, silver medalist(s)
Loan Bozzolo; Julia Pereira de Sousa Mabileau	Mixed team	—N/a			3	Did not advance		9
Merlin Surget; Chloé Trespeuch	Mixed team	—N/a			4	Did not advance		13

== See also ==
- France at the 2022 Winter Paralympics
