= Giulia Tanno =

Swiss freestyle skier (born 1998)

Personal information
- Nationality: Swiss
- Born: 5 May 1998 (age 28) Lenzerheide, Switzerland
- Height: 164 cm (5 ft 5 in)
- Weight: 54 kg (119 lb)

Sport
- Country: Switzerland
- Sport: Freestyle skiing
- Event(s): Big air, slopestyle
- Club: Lenzerheide-Valbella
- Coached by: Christoph Perreten (national)

Achievements and titles
- Highest world ranking: 2nd in Big Air World Cup (2018)
Medal record
Women's freestyle skiing
Representing Switzerland
Winter X Games
Bronze medal – third place	2017 Aspen	Big Air
Winter X Games Europe
Silver medal – second place	2018 Oslo	Big Air

Giulia Tanno (born 5 May 1998) is a Swiss freestyle skier specializing in slopestyle and big air disciplines. She won a bronze medal in big air at Winter X Games XXI in Aspen. Having missed out on the Beijing Olympics in 2022, she finished 6th in the final of the Women's slopestyle at the Milan-Cortina games in 2026.

== Results ==
=== Olympic Winter Games ===
Year	Age	Slopestyle	Big Air
(Italy) 2026 Milano Cortina	27	6	13

=== World Championships ===
Year	Age	Slopestyle	Big Air
(Spain) 2017 Sierra Nevada	18	8	—N/a
(United States) 2019 Deer Valley	20	—N/a	DNS
(Georgia (country)) 2023 Bakuriani	24	10	13
