= Anni Kärävä =

Finnish freestyle skier (born 2000)

Personal information
- Born: 28 April 2000 (age 26) Espoo, Finland

Sport
- Sport: Freestyle skiing
- Event(s): Big air, Slopestyle
Medal record
Women's freestyle skiing
Representing Finland
World Championships
Bronze medal – third place	2025 Engadin	Big air

Anni Kärävä (born 28 April 2000) is a Finnish freestyle skier. She represented Finland at the 2022 and 2026 Winter Olympics.

== Career ==
In December 2021, she was selected to represent Finland at the 2022 Winter Olympics. She competed in the big air event and finished in ninth place with a score of 136.50 points.

On 10 January 2025, during the 2024–25 FIS Freestyle Ski World Cup, she earned her first FIS Freestyle Ski World Cup podium finish. In March 2025, she competed at the 2025 FIS Freestyle Ski World Championships and won a bronze medal in the big air event with a score of 167.75 points. She also competed in the slopestyle event and finished in seventh place with a score of 57.63 points.

In January 2026, she was selected to represent Finland at the 2026 Winter Olympics.

== Results ==
=== Olympic Winter Games ===
Year	Age	Slopestyle	Big Air
(China) 2022 Beijing	21	10	21
(Italy) 2026 Milano Cortina	25	8	8

=== World Championships ===
Year	Age	Slopestyle	Big Air
(Spain) 2017 Sierra Nevada	16	12	—N/a
(United States) 2021 Aspen	20	7	12
(Georgia (country)) 2023 Bakuriani	22	5	10
(Switzerland) 2025 Engadin	24	7	3
