= FIS Freestyle Ski and Snowboarding World Championships 2023 – Women's ski big air =

Women's ski big air at the FIS Freestyle Ski and Snowboarding World Championships 2023
- Location: Bakuriani, Georgia
- Dates: 3 March (qualification); 4 March
- Competitors: 15 from 10 nations
- Winning points: 186.75

Medalists
gold medal	Tess Ledeux	France
silver medal	Sandra Eie	Norway
bronze medal	Megan Oldham	Canada

The Women's ski big air competition at the FIS Freestyle Ski and Snowboarding World Championships 2023 was held on 3 and 4 March 2023.

== Qualification ==
The qualification was started on 3 March at 16:20. The eight best skiers qualified for the final.

Rank	Bib	Start order	Name	Country	Run 1	Run 2	Best	Notes
1	7	2	Kirsty Muir	Great Britain	80.00	93.80	93.80	Q
2	1	5	Tess Ledeux	France	90.20	84.20	90.20	Q
3	6	9	Megan Oldham	Canada	89.00	20.80	89.00	Q
4	4	7	Mathilde Gremaud	Switzerland	88.00	17.40	88.00	Q
5	8	1	Sandra Eie	Norway	26.20	84.60	84.60	Q
6	12	11	Kateryna Kotsar	Ukraine	63.80	77.20	77.20	Q
7	14	13	Muriel Mohr	Germany	71.60	75.60	75.60	Q
8	11	15	Yang Ruyi	China	74.00	75.00	75.00	Q
9	16	12	Yuna Koga	Japan	67.20	72.20	72.20	
10	9	3	Anni Kärävä	Finland	56.80	61.60	61.60	
11	15	16	Anouk Andraska	Switzerland	51.80	12.60	51.80	
12	2	4	Johanne Killi	Norway	49.60	20.40	49.60	
13	3	6	Giulia Tanno	Switzerland	32.80	13.80	32.80	
14	17	14	Liu Mengting	China	17.80	22.40	22.40	
15	5	10	Sarah Höfflin	Switzerland	13.20	15.20	15.20	
	10	8	Ruby Star Andrews	New Zealand	Did not start			

== Final ==
The final was started on 4 March at 15:15.

Rank	Bib	Start order	Name	Country	Run 1	Run 2	Run 3	Total
1st place, gold medalist(s)	1	7	Tess Ledeux	France	94.25	39.00	92.50	186.75
2nd place, silver medalist(s)	8	4	Sandra Eie	Norway	87.00	47.25	88.00	175.00
3rd place, bronze medalist(s)	6	6	Megan Oldham	Canada	88.75	17.75	85.25	174.00
4	7	8	Kirsty Muir	Great Britain	87.50	68.00	83.50	171.00
5	12	3	Kateryna Kotsar	Ukraine	62.75	10.75	65.00	127.75
6	14	2	Muriel Mohr	Germany	58.50	52.00	17.25	110.50
7	11	1	Yang Ruyi	China	35.00	15.25	70.25	105.25
8	4	5	Mathilde Gremaud	Switzerland	Did not start			
