= Kea Kühnel =

German freestyle skier

Personal information
- Born: 16 March 1991 (age 34)

Sport
- Country: Germany
- Sport: Freestyle skiing
- Event: Slopestyle

Kea Kühnel (born 16 March 1991) is a German freestyle skier who competes internationally. She competed in the World Championships 2017, and participated at the 2018 Winter Olympics.
