= Lee Mee-hyun =

South Korean freestyle skier

Personal information
- Nationality: South Korean
- Born: 25 October 1994 (age 30); South Korea

Sport
- Sport: Freestyle skiing
- Event: Slopestyle

Lee Mee-hyun (born 25 October 1994) is a South Korean freestyle skier who competes internationally.

She competed in the World Championships 2017, and participated at the 2018 Winter Olympics. She finished in 13th place in a controversial call by the judges that kept her from qualifying for the finals.
