= Mathilde Gremaud =

Swiss freestyle skier (born 2000)

- Gremaud in 2026

Personal information
- Born: 8 February 2000 (age 26) Fribourg, Switzerland
- Height: 1.68 m (5 ft 6 in)
- Weight: 56 kg (123 lb)
- Website: www.mathildegremaud.ch

Sport
- Country: Switzerland
- Sport: Freestyle skiing
- Event: Slopestyle
- Club: La Berra
Medal record
Women's freestyle skiing
Representing Switzerland
Event	1st	2nd	3rd
Olympic Games	2	1	1
World Championships	2	1	0
Winter X Games	4	5	2
Total	8	7	3
Olympic Games
Gold medal – first place	2022 Beijing	Slopestyle
Gold medal – first place	2026 Milano Cortina	Slopestyle
Silver medal – second place	2018 Pyeongchang	Slopestyle
Bronze medal – third place	2022 Beijing	Big air
World Championships
Gold medal – first place	2023 Bakuriani	Slopestyle
Gold medal – first place	2025 Engadin	Slopestyle
Silver medal – second place	2021 Aspen	Slopestyle
Winter X Games
Gold medal – first place	2017 Norway	Big air
Gold medal – first place	2019 Aspen	Big air
Gold medal – first place	2021 Aspen	Big air
Gold medal – first place	2026 Aspen	Big air
Silver medal – second place	2020 Aspen	Big air
Silver medal – second place	2020 Norway	Slopestyle
Silver medal – second place	2022 Aspen	Slopestyle
Silver medal – second place	2023 Aspen	Slopestyle
Silver medal – second place	2024 Aspen	Slopestyle
Bronze medal – third place	2019 Norway	Big air
Bronze medal – third place	2026 Aspen	Slopestyle

Mathilde Gremaud (French pronunciation: [matild ɡʁəmo]; born 8 February 2000) is a Swiss Olympic freestyle skier and eleven-time X Games medalist. On 28 February 2023, she became the first freestyle skier to hold both slopestyle World and Olympic Champion titles after winning gold in both events. She won another gold medal at the 2026 Winter Olympics.

== Early life ==
Gremaud was born on February 8, 2000, in Fribourg, Switzerland. Her partner is Austrian moutainbiker Valentina Höll.

== Career ==
Gremaud competed in the World Championships 2017. She competed at the FIS Freestyle Ski and Snowboarding World Championships 2021, winning a silver medal in Slopestyle.

Gremaud won gold in big air at the Winter X Games in 2017, 2019, and 2021. She won silver medals in big air and slopestyle in 2020. In 2019, she won bronze in big air.

She competed in the 2018 Winter Olympics and took the silver medal in women's Slopestyle. At the 2022 Winter Olympics, Gremaud won the gold medal in slopestyle and the bronze medal in big air. Gremaud was coached by Swiss freeski coach Misra Noto Torniainen for the 2018 Winter Olympics. Torniainen would later coach China's Eileen Gu for the 2022 Winter Olympics.

In 2020, Gremaud became the first woman to land a switch double cork 1440 in competition history.

In 2024, Gremaud became the first woman to win three FIS crystal globes in one season.

Gremaud won the gold medal in the slopestyle at the 2026 Winter Olympics in Italy. She recorded a high score of 86.96 in her second run and finished 0.38 points clear of Eileen Gu who finished on 86.58.

== Results ==
=== Olympic Winter Games ===
Year	Age	Slopestyle	Big Air
(South Korea) 2018 Pyeongchang	18	2	—N/a
(China) 2022 Beijing	22	1	3
(Italy) 2026 Milano Cortina	26	1	11

=== World Championships ===
Year	Age	Slopestyle	Big Air
(Spain) 2017 Sierra Nevada	17	5	—N/a
(United States) 2019 Deer Valley	19	—N/a	7
(United States) 2021 Aspen	21	2	24
(Georgia (country)) 2023 Bakuriani	23	1	8
(Switzerland) 2025 Engadin	25	1	20
