= Margaux Hackett =

New Zealand freestyle skier

Personal information
- Full name: Margaux Mary Hackett
- Born: 2 June 1999 (age 27) Annecy, France
- Height: 161 cm (5 ft 3 in)
- Relative: A. J. Hackett (father)

Sport
- Country: New Zealand
- Sport: Freestyle skiing

Margaux Mary Hackett (born 2 June 1999) is a New Zealand freestyle skier who competes internationally. She represented New Zealand in the women's slopestyle and big air events at the 2022 Winter Olympics in Beijing, China.

== Biography ==
Hackett was born and raised in Annecy, France, to a New Zealand father, adventure tourism entrepreneur A. J. Hackett, and a French mother. She learnt to ski when she was four years old and, as a child, joined an alpine ski club in the French Alps.

Hackett is based in Wānaka during the New Zealand winter and Manigod, France, during the Northern Hemisphere winter. She is coached by Snow Sports New Zealand high-performance freeski coach Hamish McDougall.
