= Consulate General of China, New York =

Consulate-General of the People's Republic of China in New York 中华人民共和国驻纽约总领事馆
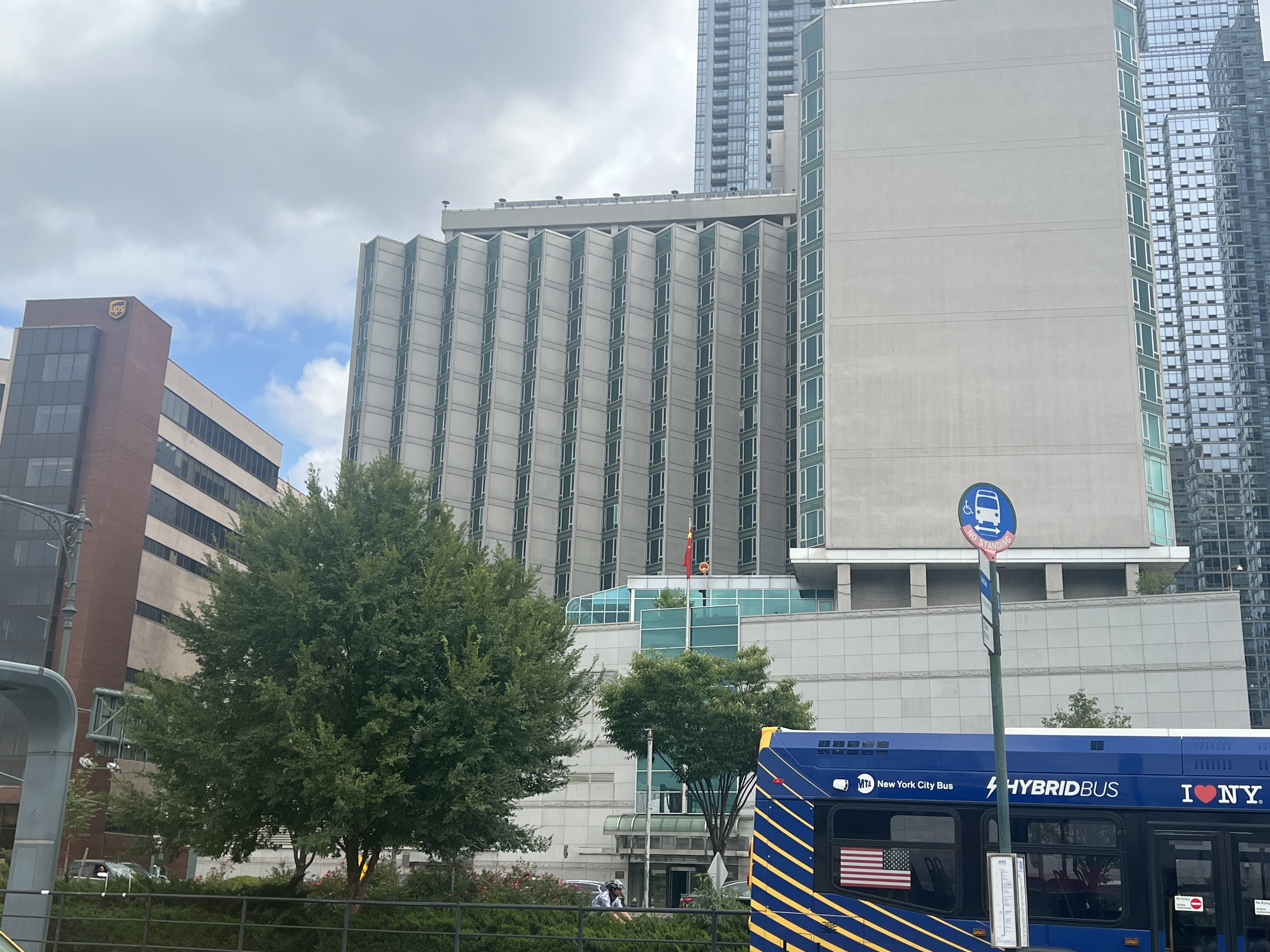
- Location: Midtown Manhattan, New York City, US
- Address: 520 12th Ave
- Coordinates: 40°45′44″N 74°00′01″W
- Consul General: vacant
- Website: newyork.china-consulate.gov.cn

The Consulate-General of the People's Republic of China in New York (Chinese: 中华人民共和国驻纽约总领事馆), or simply the Consulate General of China in New York, is a diplomatic mission of China in the United States, headquartered in Midtown Manhattan, New York City. The most recent consul general was Huang Ping, serving from 2018 to 2024.. The building itself was built in 1962 and designed by Morris Lapidus. For many decades it was the Sheraton Motor Inn until 2002 when it was reworked into a consulate building.

== History ==
=== Espionage ===
In September 2020, US secretary of state Mike Pompeo described the consulate as a "spy hub" after the arrest of a New York City Police Department officer charged with spying for the Chinese government. An editorial in the Chinese Communist Party-owned Global Times tabloid newspaper rejected Pompeo's claims, threatening retaliation against American diplomats if Chinese diplomats were detained or deported.

=== Protests ===
The consulate has been the site of numerous protests, including against the Chinese government response to COVID-19 in 2022 and to mark the anniversary of the handover of Hong Kong.

=== Linda Sun indictment ===
In September 2024, Linda Sun, a former deputy chief of staff to New York governor Kathy Hochul, was indicted for violating the Foreign Agents Registration Act. The indictment showed that Sun had worked with the consulate to prevent then-lieutenant governor Hochul from attending an event at the Taipei Economic and Cultural Office in New York.

The indictment likewise showed Consul General Huang Ping had given direct orders and bribes to Sun. Hochul requested Huang be expelled by US secretary of state Antony Blinken. The consulate's official website lists Huang as having served until September 2024.
