= British Universities Snowsports Council =

Defunct UK snowsports organization run by and for students

- Country: United Kingdom
- Domestic cup: British University Snowsports Championships @ The main event.
- Website: http://www.buscevents.com/

The BUSC or British Universities Snowsports Council was active between 1990 and 2014 with the motto 'Run by students, for students', its sole aim was to promote and increase participation and competition in skiing and snowboarding at all levels for students in the United Kingdom, it was a unique students sporting organisation as it was run by students for students. An annual vote would be held in November at BUDS to elect a new committee, who would commence running BUSC and upholding the BUSC constitution from the following April for one year. In 2014 Wasteland Ski took over running over the event, ending the student led era.

== Activities ==
The main role of BUSC as an organisation was to run events for student snowsports and it was the only BUCS (British Universities Sports Association) recognised organiser of snowsports competitions at the time.

The BUSC year included races, freestyle competitions, demo days, parties and culminate at The Main Event. This was a two-week event with competitions, ski and snowboard lessons, freestyle exhibitions and night time entertainment.

== History ==
British University Snowsports Championships began over 80 years ago and was set up by Oxford and Cambridge. Originally a Ski Championships (Slalom and Giant Slalom only), they were held annually in the Cairngorm mountains.

In 1977 two students of English universities, Kareem Gangee of UCL and Anthony Peters of the University of Manchester agreed, during the BUSF championships at Aviemore, that it would be easier and better for English university teams to travel by package tour to France to ski than it was to haul by minibus to Scotland and that the snow conditions would be more reliable. They agreed to try to arrange an English university chamopship event for the pre-Christmas week. Oxford and Cambridge were invited to join but opted to stick with their annual Crystal Cup competition in St Moritz in Switzerland which was held during the same period.

They approached UAU, the governing body of English university sports, with the idea but it was rejected due to a rule which stated that if a sport could be carried out on the British Isles, it had to be. This defeated the object. The two students agreed therefore to disaffiliate skiing from UAU and formed EUSC, the English University Ski Council, and arranged a first championship in Les Arcs in France in December 1979. The championship was won by Manchester who, according to the rules, became responsible for organising the following year's event.

At the captains' meeting at the close of this week the representative of Bangor university requested that they, as a Welsh team, should be included and the first collective decision taken by the captains' committee was to rename the body English and Welsh Universities Ski Council, EWUSC

Prior to 1991 the BUSF (British University Sports Federation (1962–1994)) Championships had been held during Easter vacation in Scotland. Also held annually were the SUSF (Scottish University Sports Federation (?–2005)) Championships in Scotland and the EWUSC races (1979 –1992) during the first week of the Christmas holidays in the Alps

Due to technical issues at the event in academic year 1989–90 the decision was made to move the event to the Alps, Kings Ski Club provided the organisation for first BUSF Championships to be held abroad. Unfortunately the event was not to the expected standards due to the Tour Op, which resulted in no BUSF championships being held the following year.

The organisers of the EWUSC Championships decided to invite the Scottish Universities to their event and to form BUSC (British University Ski Championships). The first BUSC Championships were held in 1993 in the French resort of Les Menuires. In 2005, after 3 successful years working with Wasteland Ski, the BUSC committee signed a 25-year contract expiring on 1 June 2029 in which Wasteland would create a sister company called ETC (Events Travel Company), which would share 50% of profits with BUSC, and remain separate from Wasteland Ski management.

In 2010, with the creation of BUSC Events, the contract was resigned to continue on, unfortunately from 2011 onwards Wasteland took increasingly aggressive steps to manage ETC and BUSC. In 2011, Wasteland took over the BUSC Captains Trip, simply rebranding it as the Wasteland Captains Trip. From 2012 Wasteland ski not only failed to fulfil their side of the contract, but Wasteland management took control of ETC, and had an active participation in the running of BUSC Events. During this time Wasteland Ski began talks with BUCS (British Universities and Colleges Sport) to take over BUSC Events.

In 2013, talks between the BUSC committee, BUCS and Wasteland Ski began regarding the future of BUSC, with the Outlaw Pt.2 committee agreeing to relinquish control to Wasteland Ski as long as three student intern were hired as a gesture to years gone by. With the final BUSC Alpine Championship (Main Event) being held in 2014 in Alpe D'Huez, France, the smallest Main Event on record, the Outlaw Pt.2 committee went against the constitution and the popular vote, refused to hold a new election and handed over control to Wasteland Ski.

Over the years the Championships evolved from being a Ski (Slalom and Giant Slalom only) event held over a weekend in Scotland into a year of events for skiing and snowboarding, racing and freestyle, but mainly catering to students who wanted to get blind drunk. BUSC's final calendar (though it varied greatly over the years);

- Summer Session – June/July
- Captain's Trip – October (until 2011)
- British Universities Dry-Slope Championships (BUDS) – November
- British Universities Indoor Snowsports Championships (BUISC) – February/March
- The Main Event – British Universities Alpine Championships (ME) – March/April

== Events ==
=== Summer Session ===
Held over the course of a week in late June or early July in the French Alps, normally in the resort of Tignes it moved to Les Deux Alpes in 2011 for one year. Consisted of mornings on the Glacier for Ski and Snowboard Race and Freestyle training and afternoons with other activities and sports like mountain biking, swimming, golf, white water rafting, bungee jumping, climbing, beach volleyball and more.

=== Captain's Trip ===
Held at the end of October for a weekend on the Glacier in Les Deux Alpes the event allowed the organisers of BUSC's constituent member clubs to meet each other and often signals the start of the election process for the following years organising committee. This event was taken over by Wasteland Ski in 2011 and is now the Wasteland Captain's Trip.

=== BUDS ===
The British Universities Dry-Slope Championships took place at Hillend near Edinburgh in Scotland over the course over a Friday and Saturday in November. Competitions included;

- Ski Slalom (BUCS affiliated)
- Ski Giant Slalom (BUCS affiliated)
- Snowboard Giant Slalom (BUCS affiliated)
- BoarderX
- Snowboard Team Dual Slalom Knock Out
- Ski Team Dual Slalom Knock Out
- Snowboard Slopestyle
- Ski Slopestyle
- Snowboard Big Air
- Ski Big Air

=== BUISC ===
The British Universities Indoor Snowsports Championships took place over February and March. Universities competed at Regional Qualifiers before the Finals which also included the Ski2Help Charity Event

==== Qualifiers ====
- Braehead (Scottish region)
- Castleford (Northern region)
- Milton Keynes (Midlands region)
- Milton Keynes (Southern region)

==== Finals ====
- Castleford (BUISC Finals / Ski 2 Help)

Competitions included;

- Ski Slalom
- Snowboard Slalom
- Ski Team Dual Slalom Knock Out
- Snowboard Team Dual Slalom Knock Out
- Snowboard Slopestyle
- Ski Slopestyle

=== The Main Event ===
Held every Easter in the Alps over a two-week period in late March/early April.

==== British Universities Alpine Championships ====
The British Universities Alpine Championships took place during the second week of The Main Event. BUSC was the only organisation able to run British Universities and Colleges Sport(BUCS) sanctioned Snowsports events during its time and so the BUCS Alpine Championships were incorporated into the Main Event.

===== BUSC Events =====
- Racing
  - Ski Slalom (BUCS affiliated)
  - Ski Giant Slalom (BUCS affiliated)
  - Ski Super G (BUCS affiliated)
  - Snowboard Giant Slalom (BUCS affiliated)
  - Snowboard Individual Dual Slalom Knock Out
  - Ski Team Dual Slalom Knock Out
  - Snowboard Team Dual Slalom Knock Out
- Cross
  - Snowboard Cross
  - Ski Cross
- Freestyle
  - Snowboard Big Air
  - Ski Big Air
  - Snowboard Slopestyle
  - Ski Slopestyle
  - Snowboard Half Pipe (Snowboard Rail Jam if half pipe was not available)
  - Ski Half Pipe (Ski Rail Jam if half pipe was not available)

=== Stick it or Lick it! ===
An end of academic year Ski and Snowboard Freestyle competition built on dry slope, using real snow, next to a beach, in a forest, at Beach Break Live festival in June, this event ran until 2012 when Beach Break Live decided to move locations.

== Past main event venues ==
| Academic Year | Resort | Country | Organising Committee | Notes | Results |
|---|---|---|---|---|---|
| ????-1990 | (Scotland) Aviemore (Cairngorm) | Scotland | Various | BUSF | |
| 1990–1991 | (France) Chamonix | France | Kings Ski Club | BUSF | |
| 1991–1992 | | | | No Championship Held | |
| 1992–1993 | (France) Les Menuires | France | Bristol | First BUSC | |
| 1993–1994 | (France) Tignes | France | | Held in December 1993 | |
| 1994–1995 | (France) Les Arcs | France | Sheffield | | |
| 1995–1996 | (France) Les Arcs | France | Manchester | | |
| 1996–1997 | (France) La Plagne | France | Loughborough | | |
| 1997–1998 | (France) Les Arcs | France | Newcastle | | |
| 1998–1999 | (France) Les Arcs | France | Dundee, Heriot-Watt | | |
| 1999–2000 | (Austria) Saalbach-Hinterglemm | Austria | Man Met | | |
| 2000–2001 | (Austria) Saalbach-Hinterglemm | Austria | Glasgow | | |
| 2001–2002 | (France) Les Arcs | France | Nottingham | | |
| 2002–2003 | (France) Les Deux Alpes | France | Edinburgh | | |
| 2003–2004 | (France) Les Deux Alpes | France | Bristol | | |
| 2004–2005 | (France) Risoul | France | Salford | | |
| 2005–2006 | (France) Les Deux Alpes | France | Newcastle | | |
| 2006–2007 | (France) Les Deux Alpes | France | Edinburgh | | |
| 2007–2008 | (Austria) Saalbach-Hinterglemm | Austria | All Star | THE BEST ONE BY FAR | |
| 2008–2009 | (France) Alpe d'Huez | France | Loughborough | | |
| 2009–2010 | (France) Alpe d'Huez | France | Decade | | |
| 2010–2011 | (France) Tignes | France | Best of the West | | Results |
| 2011–2012 | (Austria) Saalbach-Hinterglemm | Austria | Sweet | | |
| 2012–2013 | (France) Alpe d'Huez | France | Outlaw | | |
| 2013–2014 | (France) Alpe d'Huez | France | Outlaw pt.2 | Final BUSC Event, smallest on record | |

== Final days ==
With BUCS taking the competitions to be run in house, they hired a member of the Outlaw pt.2 committee, but like David Cameron, they fucked it for everyone, then walked away. Wasteland Ski then signed a 5-year contract with a 3-year opt out to be the tour operator for the dryslope, indoor and alpine championships, thus taking control of the remainder of BUSC Events. For the 2014-2015 year, Wasteland hired 3 intern, all BUSC veterans. Wasteland Ski initially offered them a wage below the minimum wage, and asked them all to move to London. They did move to London and work out of the Wasteland Ski office but were paid a slightly more reasonable wage.

In 2015-2016 they hired 3 more interns, delving outside of the BUSC dedicated, 2 promptly quit and the final became a Wasteland employee. With BUSC solely ran by Wasteland, the student led era had finally ended.

== End of an Era ==
With 2015-2017 being solely run by Wasteland, this seemed to continue into 2017-2018 until BUCS decided to opt-out of using Wasteland Ski as their tour operator and cancel the Alpine Championships, instead they held a Spring Dryslope Championships in Stoke. Due to a change in what people want from trips and with a regular year on year decline in competitor numbers it looks like the old way of student snowsports has come to an end.
