= Lana Prusakova =

Russian freestyle skier

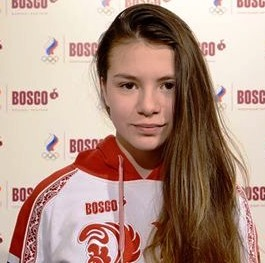

Personal information
- Nationality: Russian
- Born: 10 June 2000 (age 26) Novocheboksarsk, Russia
- Height: 1.58 m (5 ft 2 in)
- Weight: 45 kg (99 lb)

Sport
- Country: Russia
- Sport: Freestyle skiing
- Event: Slopestyle
Medal record
Women's freestyle skiing
Representing Russian Ski Federation
World Championships
Silver medal – second place	2021 Aspen	Big air
Representing Russia
Winter Universiade
Gold medal – first place	2019 Krasnoyarsk	Slopestyle
Youth Olympic Games
Gold medal – first place	2016 Lillehammer	Slopestyle

Lana Alekseyevna Prusakova (Russian: Лана Алексеевна Прусакова; born 10 June 2000) is a Russian freestyle skier who competes internationally.

She competed in the World Championships 2017, and participated at the 2018 Winter Olympics.
