= Yang Shuorui =

Chinese freestyle skier

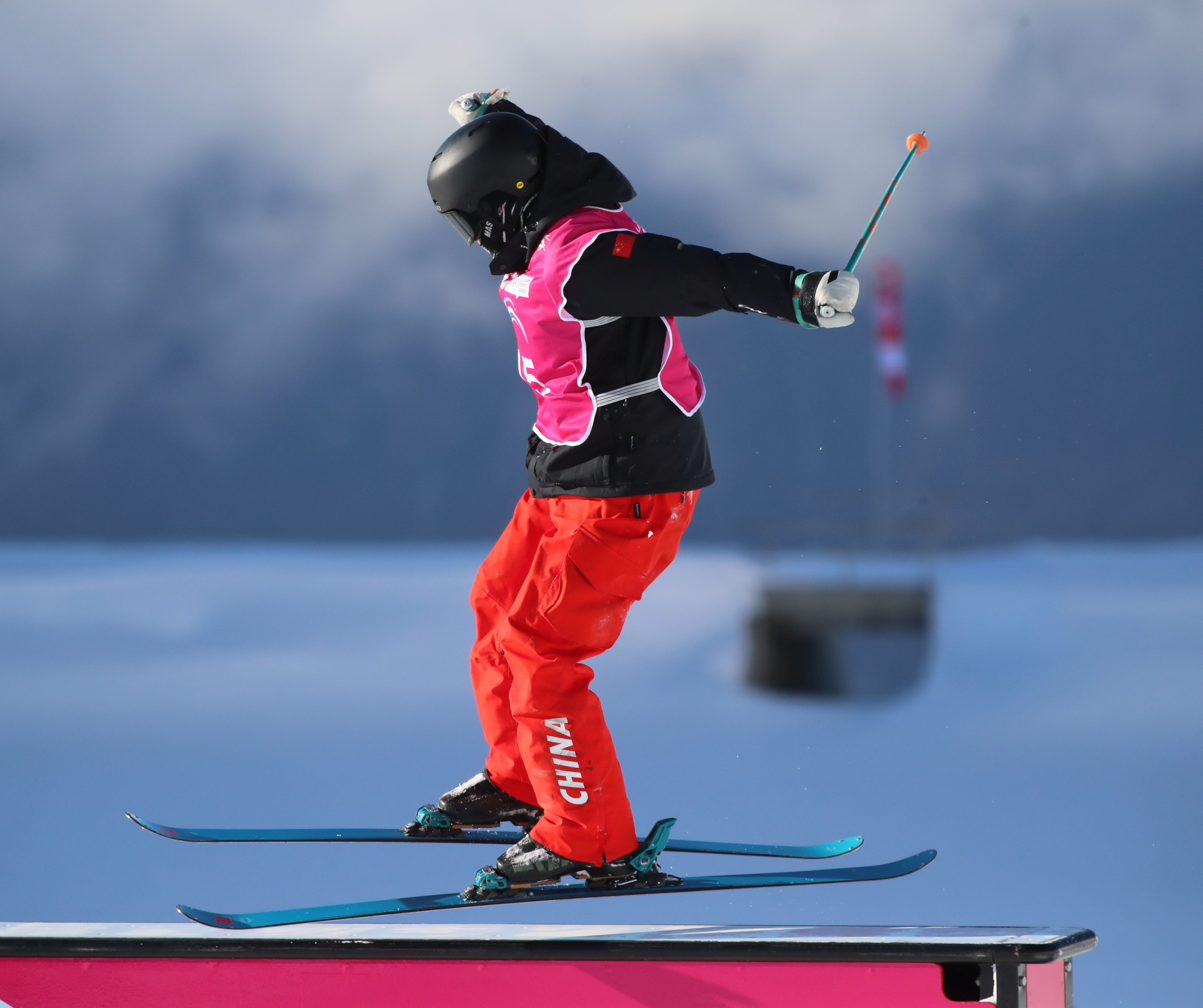
- 1st qualification run of Freestyle skiing – Women's Freestyle Slopestyle at the 2020 Winter Youth Olympics in Lausanne on January, 18 2020.

Personal information
- Nationality: Chinese
- Born: 8 January 2004 (age 21); Heilongjiang, China

Sport
- Country: China
- Sport: Freestyle skiing
- Event(s): Slopestyle, Big air

Shuorui Yang (born 8 January 2004) is a Chinese freestyle skier who competed at the 2022 Winter Olympics.

She is currently ranked 10th in the world in big air and 13th in slopestyle.
