= Lou Barin =

French freestyle skier

Personal information
- Born: 26 January 1999 (age 27)

Sport
- Country: France
- Sport: Freestyle skiing
- Event: Slopestyle
Medal record
Representing France
Women's freestyle skiing
Winter Universiade
Bronze medal – third place	2019 Krasnoyarsk	Slopestyle

Lou Barin (born 26 January 1999) is a French freestyle skier who competes internationally.

She participated at the 2018 Winter Olympics.
