= Yuki Tsubota =

Canadian freestyle skier

Personal information
- Born: February 3, 1994 (age 32) Vancouver, British Columbia, Canada
- Height: 5 ft 3 in (160 cm)
- Weight: 145 lb (66 kg)

Sport
- Country: Canada

Yuki Tsubota (born February 3, 1994) is a Canadian freestyle skier of Japanese descent. She competed for Canada at the 2014 Winter Olympics in the slopestyle event. Tsubota crashed in the final run of the slopestyle event, suffering a concussion and broken cheekbone and finishing sixth. She competed in the slopestyle event in the 2018 Winter Olympics as well, again finishing in sixth place.
