= Caroline Claire =

American slopestyle skier

Caroline Claire (born February 2, 2000) is an American slopestyle skier. She was a member of the United States national team for the 2018 Winter Olympics in Pyeongchang, South Korea and the 2022 Winter Olympics in Beijing, China.

== Early life ==
Caroline Claire was born in Edina, Minnesota. Claire has three brothers. She began skiing around the time she learned to walk. She later moved to Manchester Center, Vermont where Claire attends Stratton Mountain School.

== Career ==
Claire won bronze in slopestyle at the FIS Junior World Championships in both 2015 and 2017. Claire found success on the Revolution Tour in 2016 with podium finishes in each of her appearances on the amateur tour that year. Claire was a discretionary pick to compete for the United States Olympic team in slopestyle for the 2018 Winter Olympics in Pyeongchang.
