= Anastasia Tatalina =

Russian freestyle skier

Personal information
- Nationality: Russian
- Born: 5 September 2000 (age 25) Novosibirsk, Russia
- Height: 1.67 m (5 ft 6 in)
- Weight: 55 kg (121 lb)

Sport
- Country: Russia
- Sport: Freestyle skiing
- Event(s): Slopestyle, Big air
Medal record
Women's freestyle skiing
Representing Russian Ski Federation
World Championships
Gold medal – first place	2021 Aspen	Big air
Representing Russia
Winter Universiade
Silver medal – second place	2019 Krasnoyarsk	Slopestyle

Anastasia Viktorovna Tatalina (Russian: Анастасия Викторовна Таталина; born 5 September 2000) is a Russian freestyle skier who competes internationally.

She competed in the World Championships 2017, and participated at the 2018 Winter Olympics. At the 2021 World Championships in Aspen, she scored more than 90 points in two consecutive jumps, and won gold in women's ski big air.
