= Abi Harrigan =

Australian freestyle skier (born 2002)

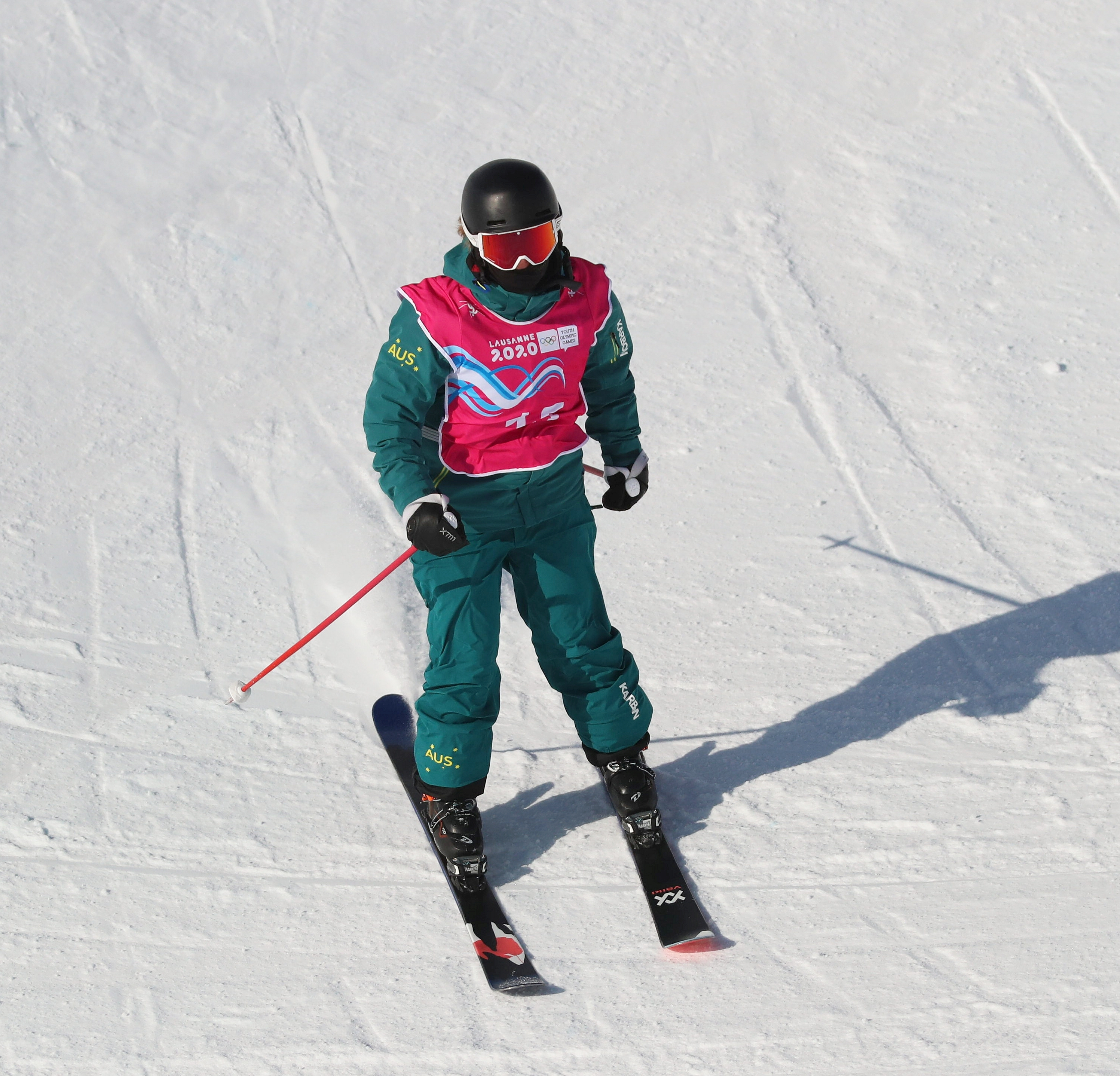
- Harrigan at the 2020 Winter Youth Olympics

Personal information
- Full name: Abi Meg Harrigan
- Nationality: Australia
- Born: 6 May 2002 (age 24) Canberra, Australian Capital Territory

Sport
- Sport: Skiing

Abi Meg Harrigan (born 6 May 2002) is an Australian freestyle skier. She competed at the 2022 Winter Olympics in Beijing, despite fracturing her right fibula three weeks prior, and placed 26th in the women's slopestyle event. Harrigan was also a competitor at the 2020 Winter Youth Olympics and the FIS Freestyle Ski and Snowboarding World Championships 2021.

Harrigan was born in Canberra and grew up in Jindabyne, New South Wales.
