= Olivia Asselin =

Canadian freestyle skier (born 2004)

Personal information
- Born: 24 February 2004 (age 22) Quebec City, Quebec, Canada

Sport
- Country: Canada
- Sport: Freestyle skiing
- Events: Slopestyle, Big air
Medal record
Winter X Games
Silver medal – second place	2022 Aspen	Freeski big air

Olivia Asselin (born 24 February 2004) is a Canadian freestyle skier from Quebec City, who competes internationally in the big air and slopestyle disciplines.

== Career ==
Asselin joined the national team in 2019. Asselin won the bronze medal at the 2022 Winter X Games in the big air event.

On January 24, 2022, Asselin was named to Canada's 2022 Olympic team in the big air and slopestyle events.

On March 19, 2025, Olivia Asselin didn't qualify for the Ski Freestyle and Snowboard World Championships in Engadin.
