= Freestyle skiing at the 2022 Winter Olympics =

Freestyle skiing at the XXIV Olympic Winter Games
- Freestyle skiing pictograms
- Venue: Genting Snow Park; Big Air Shougang
- Dates: 3–19 February 2022
- No. of events: 13 (6 men, 6 women, 1 mixed)
- Competitors: 284 from 25 nations

Freestyle skiing at the 2022 Winter Olympics were held at the Genting Snow Park in Zhangjiakou and Big Air Shougang in Beijing, China. The events were held between 3 and 19 February 2022. A total of 13 freestyle skiing events were held.

In July 2018, the International Olympic Committee (IOC) officially added three events to the Olympic program: big air for men and women, along with a mixed team aerials event. A total of 284 quota spots (142 per gender) were distributed to the sport, a decline of 4 from the 2018 Winter Olympics. A total of 13 events were contested, six for men, six for women and one mixed.

== Qualification ==
A maximum of 284 quota spots are available to athletes at the games. A maximum of 30 athletes could be entered by a National Olympic Committee, with a maximum of 16 men or 16 women. If a NOC has qualified enough athletes to enter the mixed team event in aerials then they may extend their total to 32 athletes. Each event has a specific quota amount allocated to it. The athlete quota per event is listed below.

Event	Men	Women	Minimum FIS points
Aerials	25	25	80.00
Big air/Slopestyle	30	30	50.00
Halfpipe	25	25	50.00
Moguls	30	30	80.00
Ski cross	32	32	80.00
284 quotas	142	142	

- Big air and slopestyle have a combined event quota.

== Competition schedule ==
The following were the planned competition schedule for all thirteen events.

Sessions that include the event finals are shown in bold.

All times are (UTC+8).

Date	Time	Event
3 February	18:00	Women's moguls
3 February	19:45	Men's moguls
5 February	19:30	**Men's moguls**
6 February	19:30	**Women's moguls**
7 February	9:30	Women's big air
7 February	13:30	Men's big air
8 February	10:00	**Women's big air**
9 February	11:00	**Men's big air**
10 February	19:00	**Mixed team aerials**
14 February	10:00	Women's ski slopestyle
14 February	15:00	Women's aerials
14 February	19:00	**Women's aerials**
15 February	9:30	**Women's ski slopestyle**
15 February	12:30	Men's ski slopestyle
15 February	19:00	Men's aerials
16 February	9:30	**Men's ski slopestyle**
16 February	19:00	**Men's aerials**
17 February	9:30	Women's ski halfpipe
17 February	11:30	Women's ski cross
17 February	12:30	Men's ski halfpipe
17 February	15:10	**Women's ski cross**
18 February	9:30	**Women's ski halfpipe**
18 February	11:45	Men's ski cross
18 February	15:55	**Men's ski cross**
19 February	9:30	**Men's ski halfpipe**

== Medal summary ==
China led all nations in gold medals, with four, while the United States achieved the most medals overall, with eight.

=== Medal table ===
* Host nation (China)

Rank	Nation	Gold	Silver	Bronze	Total
1	China*	4	2	0	6
2	United States	2	4	2	8
3	Switzerland	2	1	2	5
4	Sweden	2	0	2	4
5	Australia	1	0	0	1
5	New Zealand	1	0	0	1
5	Norway	1	0	0	1
8	Canada	0	3	2	5
9	Belarus	0	1	0	1
9	France	0	1	0	1
9	Ukraine	0	1	0	1
12	ROC	0	0	3	3
13	Estonia	0	0	1	1
13	Germany	0	0	1	1
13	Japan	0	0	1	1
Totals (15 entries)		13	13	14	40

=== Men's events ===
Event	Gold		Silver		Bronze	
Aerials	Qi Guangpu; China	129.00	Oleksandr Abramenko; Ukraine	116.50	Ilya Burov; ROC	114.93
Big air	Birk Ruud; Norway	187.75	Colby Stevenson; United States	183.00	Henrik Harlaut; Sweden	181.00
Halfpipe	Nico Porteous; New Zealand	93.00	David Wise; United States	90.75	Alex Ferreira; United States	86.75
Slopestyle	Alex Hall; United States	90.01	Nick Goepper; United States	86.48	Jesper Tjäder; Sweden	85.35
Moguls	Walter Wallberg; Sweden	83.23	Mikaël Kingsbury; Canada	82.18	Ikuma Horishima; Japan	81.48
Ski cross	Ryan Regez; Switzerland		Alex Fiva; Switzerland		Sergey Ridzik; ROC	

=== Women's events ===
Event	Gold		Silver		Bronze	
Aerials	Xu Mengtao; China	108.61	Hanna Huskova; Belarus	107.95	Megan Nick; United States	93.76
Big air	Eileen Gu; China	188.25	Tess Ledeux; France	187.50	Mathilde Gremaud; Switzerland	182.50
Halfpipe	Eileen Gu; China	95.25	Cassie Sharpe; Canada	90.75	Rachael Karker; Canada	87.75
Slopestyle	Mathilde Gremaud; Switzerland	86.56	Eileen Gu; China	86.23	Kelly Sildaru; Estonia	82.06
Moguls	Jakara Anthony; Australia	83.09	Jaelin Kauf; United States	80.28	Anastasia Smirnova; ROC	77.72
Ski cross^{[note]}	Sandra Näslund; Sweden		Marielle Thompson; Canada		Daniela Maier; Germany; Fanny Smith; Switzerland	

=== Mixed ===
Event	Gold		Silver		Bronze	
Team aerials	United States; Ashley Caldwell; Christopher Lillis; Justin Schoenefeld	338.34	China; Xu Mengtao; Jia Zongyang; Qi Guangpu	324.22	Canada; Marion Thénault; Miha Fontaine; Lewis Irving	290.98

- ^{note}
Fanny Smith of Switzerland, the 2018 bronze medalist, initially crossed the line in third place and thought she had won the bronze medal. Daniela Maier of Germany finished fourth. However, following a 10-minute review by race judges, Smith was penalised for a clash with Maier, so at the awards ceremony on 17 February 2022 Maier was awarded the bronze.

On 26 February 2022, after the end of the Olympic Games, following an appeal from Fanny Smith, the FIS Appeals Commission made the decision to overturn the FIS Jury decision. As a result of winning the appeal, Smith was promoted to third place, while Maier officially finished in fourth place, which was reflected on the FIS website.

FIS has no right to make a decision on the return and redistribution of medals, as this issue is in the exclusive competence of the IOC, therefore, in its decision, the FIS Appeals Commission did not mention any words about the medals and their redistribution, and the IOC has the last word in this issue. On 13 December 2022, the Court of Arbitration for Sport decided both competitors will be awarded duplicate bronze medals and share joint third place. In December 2022, the IOC has updated the data on its website.

== Participating nations ==
26 nations sent freestyle skiers to compete in the events, including the IOC's designation of Russian Olympic Committee. Estonia debuted in the sport. The numbers of athletes are shown in parentheses.

- Australia (13)
- Austria (13)
- Belarus (6)
- Brazil (1)
- Canada (32)
- Chile (1)
- China (21)
- Czech Republic (1)
- Estonia (1)
- Finland (6)
- France (13)
- Germany (9)
- Great Britain (11)
- Ireland (1)
- Italy (6)
- Japan (12)
- Kazakhstan (9)
- New Zealand (9)
- Norway (6)
- ROC (22)
- South Korea (3)
- Spain (2)
- Sweden (14)
- Switzerland (19)
- Ukraine (5)
- United States (32)
