= Tess Ledeux =

French freestyle skier

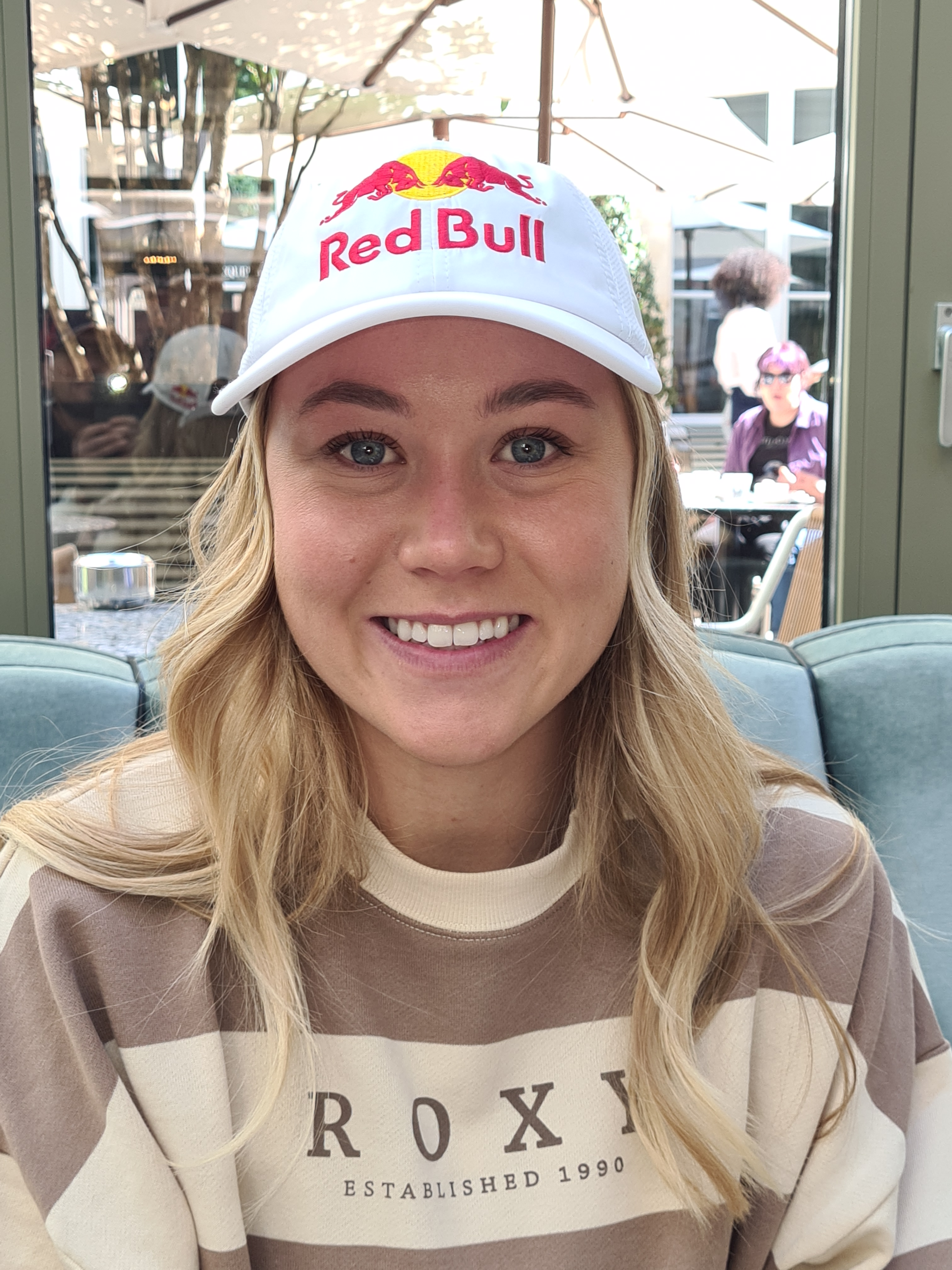
- Ledeux in 2025

Personal information
- Born: 23 November 2001 (age 24) Bourg-Saint-Maurice, France
- Height: 1.58 m (5 ft 2 in)
- Weight: 51 kg (112 lb)

Sport
- Country: France
- Sport: Freestyle skiing
- Event: Big air
- Club: C.S La Plagne
Medal record
Women's freestyle skiing
Representing France
Olympic Games
Silver medal – second place	2022 Beijing	Big air
World Championships
Gold medal – first place	2017 Sierra Nevada	Slopestyle
Gold medal – first place	2019 Utah	Big air
Gold medal – first place	2023 Bakuriani	Big air
Winter X Games
Gold medal – first place	2019 Norway	Big air
Gold medal – first place	2020 Aspen	Big air
Gold medal – first place	2024 Aspen	Slopestyle
Gold medal – first place	2022 Aspen	Slopestyle
Gold medal – first place	2022 Aspen	Big air
Silver medal – second place	2017 Aspen	Slopestyle
Silver medal – second place	2017 Norway	Slopestyle
Silver medal – second place	2023 Aspen	Big air
Bronze medal – third place	2018 Aspen	Big air

Tess Ledeux (born 23 November 2001) is a French freestyle skier who competes internationally.

She competed for France at the FIS Freestyle Ski and Snowboarding World Championships 2017 in Sierra Nevada, Spain, where she won a gold medal in slopestyle. She participated at the FIS Freestyle Ski and Snowboarding World Championships 2019, winning a medal.

She has earned four gold medals at the Winter X Games: three in big air and one in slopestyle. At the 2022 X Games, she won two gold medals, in slopestyle and big air, becoming the first woman to land a double cork 1620 in competition.

Ledeux represented France at the 2022 Winter Olympics in Peking, China, winning a silver medal in the women's big air.

In March 2025, during one of the World Cup competitions, Ledeux crashed and suffered a concussion. She did not fully recover and had to miss the whole 2025–26 season including the Winter Olympics.

== Personal life ==
Tess Ledeux is the cousin of French freestyle skier Kevin Rolland.
