= Darian Stevens =

American freestyle skier (born 1996)

Personal information
- Nationality: American
- Born: October 29, 1996 (age 28); Missoula, Montana, U.S.
- Height: 5 ft 1 in (155 cm)

Sport
- Country: United States
- Sport: Freestyle skiing
- Events: Halfpipe; Slopestyle; Big air

Darian Stevens (born October 29, 1996) is an American freestyle skier. She competed for the United States Olympic team at the 2018 Winter Olympics in Pyeongchang and the 2022 Winter Olympics in Beijing.

== Early life ==
Darian Stevens was born in Missoula, Montana. Stevens has one brother. She began skiing at age 4. She attended Westminster College.

== Career ==
Stevens competes as a skier in both halfpipe and slopestyle. Stevens placed sixth at the U.S. Grand Prix/FIS World Cup during the 2011–2012 season. Stevens missed the chance to compete at the 2014 Winter Olympics by one spot. Stevens is one of four female slopestyle skiers named to the U.S. team for the 2018 Winter Olympics in Pyeongchang.
