= IBSF World Championships 2021 – Two-woman =

Bobsleigh sporting event

Two-woman at the IBSF World Championships 2021
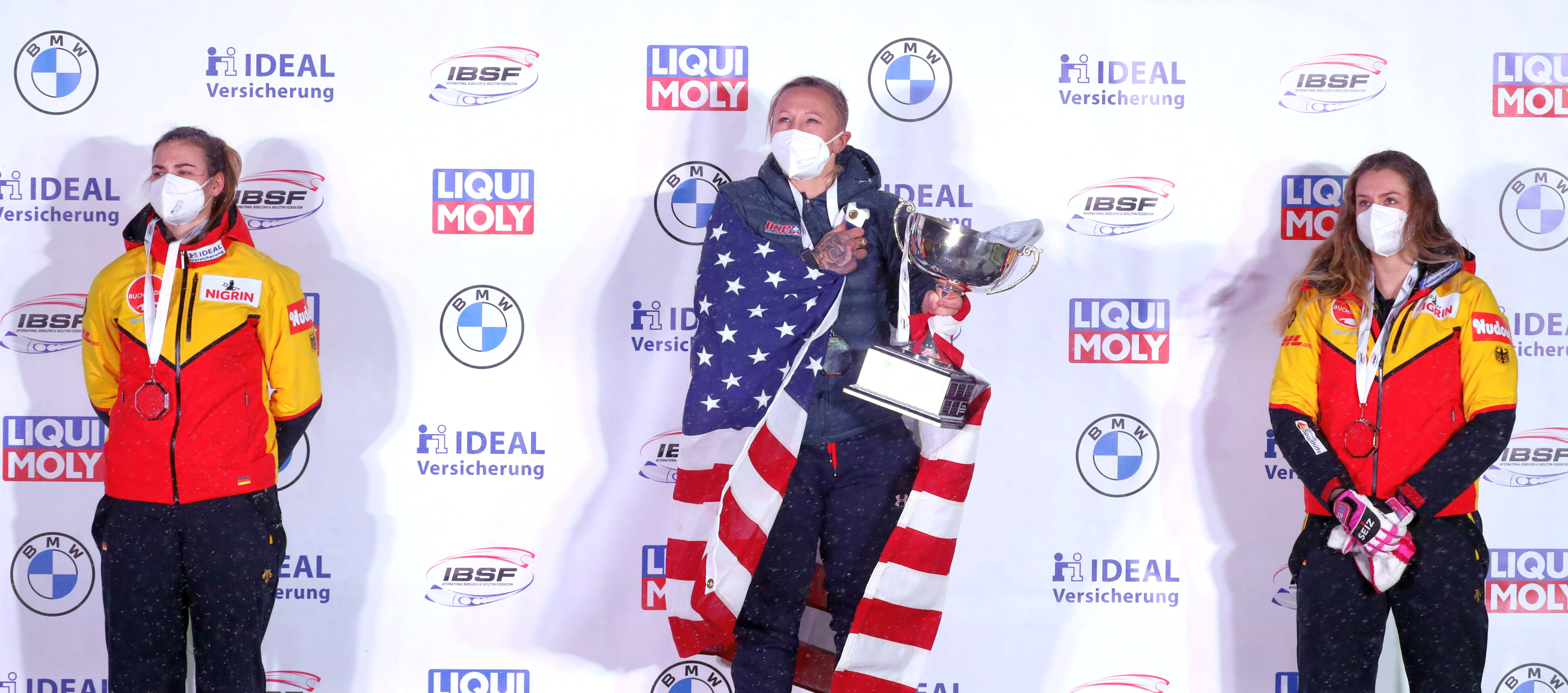
- Two-woman bobsleigh Medal Ceremony (Bobsleigh & Skeleton World Championships Altenberg 2021
- Venue: Altenberg bobsleigh, luge, and skeleton track
- Location: Altenberg, Germany
- Dates: 5–6 February
- Competitors: 41 from 11 nations
- Teams: 20
- Winning time: 3:48.26

Medalists
gold medal	Kaillie Humphries; Lolo Jones	United States
silver medal	Kim Kalicki; Ann-Christin Strack	Germany
bronze medal	Laura Nolte; Deborah Levi	Germany

The Two-woman competition at the IBSF World Championships 2021 was held on 5 and 6 February 2021.tr TV TV

== Results ==
The first two runs were started on 5 February at 10:34 and the last two runs on 6 February at 14:34.

Rank	Bib	Country	Athletes	Run 1	Rank	Run 2	Rank	Run 3	Rank	Run 4	Rank	Total	Behind
1st place, gold medalist(s)	14	United States	Kaillie Humphries; Lolo Jones	56.40	1	56.54	1	57.45	3	57.87	1	3:48.26	
2nd place, silver medalist(s)	5	Germany	Kim Kalicki; Ann-Christin Strack	56.69	3	56.59	2	57.40	1	57.93	2	3:48.61	+0.35
3rd place, bronze medalist(s)	8	Germany	Laura Nolte; Deborah Levi	56.53	2	56.84	4	57.95	4	57.95	3	3:49.27	+1.01
4	15	Germany	Stephanie Schneider; Leonie Fiebig	57.08	8	56.95	5	57.44	2	57.98	4	3:49.45	+1.19
5	12	United States	Elana Meyers; Sylvia Hoffman	56.78	4	56.99	6	58.11	8	58.26	8	3:50.14	+1.88
6	6	Germany	Mariama Jamanka; Vanessa Mark	56.88	5	57.13	12	57.96	5	58.32	11	3:50.29	+2.03
7	4	Austria	Katrin Beierl; Jennifer Onasanya	56.94	6	57.03	8	58.11	8	58.29	9	3:50.37	+2.11
8	7	Romania	Andreea Grecu; Katharina Wick	57.17	12	56.83	3	58.05	6	58.44	12	3:50.49	+2.23
9	2	Canada	Cynthia Appiah; Erica Voss	57.09	9	57.05	9	58.58	18	58.05	5	3:50.77	+2.51
10	10	Switzerland	Martina Fontanive; Nadja Pasternack (Run 1–2); Mara Morell (Run 3–4)	57.05	7	57.02	7	58.32	12	58.46	13	3:50.85	+2.59
11	20	Bobsleigh Federation of Russia	Anastasiia Makarova; Aleksandra Tarasova	57.39	15	57.17	13	58.32	12	58.12	6	3:51.00	+2.74
12	3	Canada	Alysia Rissling; Dawn Richardson Wilson	57.12	10	57.23	15	58.34	16	58.47	14	3:51.16	+2.90
13	18	Bobsleigh Federation of Russia	Nadezhda Sergeeva; Yulia Belomestnykh	57.12	10	57.53	18	58.33	14	58.30	10	3:51.28	+3.02
14	9	Switzerland	Melanie Hasler; Irina Strebel	57.49	16	57.08	10	58.10	7	58.63	17	3:51.30	+3.04
15	13	France	Margot Boch; Carla Sénéchal	57.38	14	57.11	11	58.23	11	58.79	18	3:51.51	+3.25
16	17	Canada	Christine de Bruin; Sara Villani	57.50	17	57.24	16	58.66	19	58.21	7	3:51.61	+3.35
17	16	Belgium	An Vannieuwenhuyse; Sara Aerts	57.36	13	57.21	14	58.33	14	58.79	18	3:51.69	+3.43
18	1	Bobsleigh Federation of Russia	Lyubov Chernykh; Elena Mamedova	57.73	19	57.85	19	58.15	10	58.49	15	3:52.22	+3.96
19	11	Great Britain	Mica McNeill; Montell Douglas	57.68	18	57.44	17	58.54	17	58.57	16	3:52.23	+3.97
20	19	Poland	Sylwia Smolarek; Julia Słupecka	58.41	20	58.81	20	59.79	20	59.96	20	3:56.97	+8.71
