= Canada at the 2022 Winter Olympics =

- Flag of Canada
- IOC code: CAN
- NOC: Canadian Olympic Committee
- Website: www.olympic.ca

in Beijing, China February 4–20, 2022
- Competitors: 215 (109 men and 106 women) in 14 sports
- Flag bearers (opening): Charles Hamelin; Marie-Philip Poulin
- Flag bearer (closing): Isabelle Weidemann
- Medals Ranked 11th: Gold 4 Silver 8 Bronze 14 Total 26

Winter Olympics appearances (overview)
- 1924; 1928; 1932; 1936; 1948; 1952; 1956; 1960; 1964; 1968; 1972; 1976; 1980; 1984; 1988; 1992; 1994; 1998; 2002; 2006; 2010; 2014; 2018; 2022; 2026

Canada competed at the 2022 Winter Olympics, which were held in Beijing, China, from 4 to 20 February 2022. Canada has competed in all 24 editions of the Winter Olympics.

On November 17, 2020, two-time Olympic gold medallist in speed skating Catriona Le May Doan was named as chef de mission of the delegation.

The Canadian team consisted of 215 athletes (109 men and 106 women) competing in 14 sports. Canada did not have any representation in the sport of Nordic combined. This was the third-largest Canadian Winter Olympic team after 2014 (222 athletes) and 2018 (225 athletes). The full delegation consisted of 414 people, including athletes, coaches, officials, and staff.

On February 2, 2022, short-track speed skater Charles Hamelin and hockey player Marie-Philip Poulin were named as Canada's flagbearers during the opening ceremony. Meanwhile, triple medallist speed skater Isabelle Weidemann was named the closing ceremony flagbearer.

The Canadian team won 26 medals, tied with 2010 for the second-highest total ever for Canada in Winter Games. The four gold medals won represented the lowest total since 1994 and meant the country finished outside the top ten of the medal table for the first time since 1988, a span of 34 years. However, the CEO of the Canadian Olympic Committee, David Shoemaker, was "delighted with that performance".

== Political boycott ==
On December 8, 2021, Canadian Prime Minister Justin Trudeau announced a diplomatic boycott of the games, citing human rights concerns. Trudeau said the government is "extremely concerned by the repeated human rights violations carried out by the Chinese government". The Canadian Olympic Committee and the Canadian Paralympic Committee respected the government's decision but stressed that a full boycott would have hurt athletes.

== Medallists ==
The following Canadian competitors won medals at the games. In the by-discipline sections below, medallists' names are bolded.

Medal	Name	Sport	Event	Date
Gold	Max Parrot	Snowboarding	Men's slopestyle	February 7
Gold	Ivanie Blondin; Valérie Maltais; Isabelle Weidemann	Speed skating	Women's team pursuit	February 15
Gold	Pascal Dion; Steven Dubois; Jordan Pierre-Gilles; Charles Hamelin; Maxime Laoun	Short track speed skating	Men's 5000 metre relay	February 16
Gold	Canada women's national ice hockey team: Erin Ambrose; Ashton Bell; Kristen Campbell; Emily Clark; Mélodie Daoust; Ann-Renée Desbiens; Renata Fast; Sarah Fillier; Brianne Jenner; Rebecca Johnston; Jocelyne Larocque; Emma Maltais; Emerance Maschmeyer; Sarah Nurse; Marie-Philip Poulin; Jamie Lee Rattray; Jill Saulnier; Ella Shelton; Natalie Spooner; Laura Stacey; Claire Thompson; Blayre Turnbull; Micah Zandee-Hart	Ice hockey	Women's tournament	February 17
Silver	Mikaël Kingsbury	Freestyle skiing	Men's moguls	February 5
Silver	Steven Dubois	Short track speed skating	Men's 1500 metres	February 9
Silver	Éliot Grondin	Snowboarding	Men's snowboard cross	February 10
Silver	Isabelle Weidemann	Speed skating	Women's 5000 metres	February 10
Silver	Marielle Thompson	Freestyle skiing	Women's ski cross	February 17
Silver	Cassie Sharpe	Freestyle skiing	Women's halfpipe	February 18
Silver	Laurent Dubreuil	Speed skating	Men's 1000 metres	February 18
Silver	Ivanie Blondin	Speed skating	Women's mass start	February 19
Bronze	Isabelle Weidemann	Speed skating	Women's 3000 metres	February 5
Bronze	Kim Boutin	Short track speed skating	Women's 500 metres	February 7
Bronze	Mackenzie Boyd-Clowes; Alexandria Loutitt; Matthew Soukup; Abigail Strate	Ski jumping	Mixed team	February 7
Bronze	Mark McMorris	Snowboarding	Men's slopestyle	February 7
Bronze	Meryeta O'Dine	Snowboarding	Women's snowboard cross	February 9
Bronze	James Crawford	Alpine skiing	Men's combined	February 10
Bronze	Miha Fontaine; Lewis Irving; Marion Thénault	Freestyle skiing	Mixed team aerials	February 10
Bronze	Éliot Grondin; Meryeta O'Dine	Snowboarding	Mixed team snowboard cross	February 12
Bronze	Steven Dubois	Short track speed skating	Men's 500 metres	February 13
Bronze	Christine de Bruin	Bobsleigh	Women's monobob	February 14
Bronze	Max Parrot	Snowboarding	Men's big air	February 15
Bronze	Rachael Karker	Freestyle skiing	Women's halfpipe	February 18
Bronze	Brad Gushue; Mark Nichols; Brett Gallant; Geoff Walker; Marc Kennedy	Curling	Men's tournament	February 18
Bronze	Justin Kripps; Ben Coakwell; Ryan Sommer; Cam Stones	Bobsleigh	Four-man	February 20

Medals by sport
Sport	1st place, gold medalist(s)	2nd place, silver medalist(s)	3rd place, bronze medalist(s)	Total
Snowboarding	1	1	4	**6**
Speed skating	1	3	1	**5**
Short track speed skating	1	1	2	**4**
Ice hockey	1	0	0	**1**
Freestyle skiing	0	3	2	**5**
Bobsleigh	0	0	2	**2**
Alpine skiing	0	0	1	**1**
Curling	0	0	1	**1**
Ski jumping	0	0	1	**1**
Total	4	8	14	26

Medals by date
Day	Date	1st place, gold medalist(s)	2nd place, silver medalist(s)	3rd place, bronze medalist(s)	Total
1	February 5	0	1	1	**2**
3	February 7	1	0	3	**4**
5	February 9	0	1	1	**2**
6	February 10	0	2	2	**4**
8	February 12	0	0	1	**1**
9	February 13	0	0	1	**1**
10	February 14	0	0	1	**1**
11	February 15	1	0	1	**2**
12	February 16	1	0	0	**1**
13	February 17	1	1	0	**2**
14	February 18	0	2	2	**4**
15	February 19	0	1	0	**1**
16	February 20	0	0	1	**1**
Total		4	8	14	26

Medals by gender
Gender	1st place, gold medalist(s)	2nd place, silver medalist(s)	3rd place, bronze medalist(s)	Total
Male	2	4	6	**12**
Female	2	4	5	**11**
Mixed	0	0	3	**3**
Total	4	8	14	26

=== Multiple medallists ===
A total of six Canadian athletes across three sports won multiple medals each. Speed skater Isabelle Weidemann became the first to win three medals after winning the women's team pursuit event gold medal. Weidemann would later be joined by short track speed skater Steven Dubois, who won a gold medal as part of the 5000 metres relay. Snowboarders Max Parrot, Éliot rondin, and Meryeta O'Dine each won two medals. Speed skater Ivanie Blondin was the last Canadian to earn multiple medallists after winning a silver medal in the mass start event on the penultimate day of competition.

**Name**	**Sport**	1st place, gold medalist(s)	2nd place, silver medalist(s)	3rd place, bronze medalist(s)	Total
Steven Dubois	Short track speed skating	1	1	1	3
Isabelle Weidemann	Speed skating	1	1	1	3
Ivanie Blondin	Speed skating	1	1	0	2
Max Parrot	Snowboarding	1	0	1	2
Éliot Grondin	Snowboarding	0	1	1	2
Meryeta O'Dine	Snowboarding	0	0	2	2

== Competitors ==
The following is the list of number of competitors at the Games per sport/discipline.

Sport	Men	Women	Total
Alpine skiing	5	8	13
Biathlon	4	4	8
Bobsleigh	12	6	18
Cross-country skiing	4	5	9
Curling	6	6	12
Figure skating	7	6	13
Freestyle skiing	16	16	32
Ice hockey	25	23	48
Luge	3	3	6
Short track speed skating	5	5	10
Skeleton	1	2	3
Ski jumping	2	2	4
Snowboarding	11	12	23
Speed skating	8	8	16
Total	109	106	215

== Alpine skiing ==
Canada qualified five male and eight female alpine skiers, for a total of 13. The team was officially named on January 21, 2022. Canada also qualified for the mixed team event by being ranked in the top 16 in the Nations Cup standings.

Men

Athlete	Event	Run 1		Run 2		Total	
Athlete	Event	Time	Rank	Time	Rank	Time	Rank
James Crawford	Downhill	—N/a				1:42.92	4
Brodie Seger	Downhill	—N/a				1:44.68	22
Broderick Thompson	Downhill	—N/a				DNF	
James Crawford	Super-G	—N/a				1:20.79	6
Trevor Philp	Super-G	—N/a				1:21.34	10
Brodie Seger	Super-G	—N/a				DNF	
Broderick Thompson	Super-G	—N/a				DNF	
James Crawford	Combined	1:43.14	2	48.97	7	2:32.11	3rd place, bronze medalist(s)
Trevor Philp	Combined	1:46.84	19	DNF			
Brodie Seger	Combined	1:43.54	3	51.49	10	2:35.03	9
Broderick Thompson	Combined	1:44.39	8	49.81	8	2:34.20	8
Trevor Philp	Giant slalom	1:07.14	25	1:11.94	24	2:19.08	24
Erik Read	Giant slalom	1:04.77	16	1:07.67	12	2:12.44	13
Trevor Philp	Slalom	DNF		Did not advance			
Erik Read	Slalom	55.90	22	53.20	24	1:49.10	24

Women

Athlete	Event	Run 1		Run 2		Total	
Athlete	Event	Time	Rank	Time	Rank	Time	Rank
Marie-Michèle Gagnon	Downhill	—N/a				1:33.45	8
Roni Remme	Downhill	—N/a				1:35.36	24
Marie-Michèle Gagnon	Super-G	—N/a				1:14.65	14
Roni Remme	Super-G	—N/a				1:15.78	24
Roni Remme	Combined	DNF					
Cassidy Gray	Giant slalom	DNF		Did not advance			
Valérie Grenier	Giant slalom	DNF		Did not advance			
Erin Mielzynski	Slalom	53.93	17	53.59	22	1:47.52	16
Ali Nullmeyer	Slalom	54.67	23	53.29	17	1:47.96	21
Amelia Smart	Slalom	55.26	28	54.06	26	1:49.32	27
Laurence St. Germain	Slalom	54.51	22	53.06	10	1:47.57	17

Mixed

Athlete	Event	Round of 16	Quarterfinal	Semifinal	Final / BM	
Athlete	Event	Opposition Result	Opposition Result	Opposition Result	Opposition Result	Rank
Cassidy Gray; Erin Mielzynski; Trevor Philp; Erik Read	Team	Slovenia; L 2–2*	Did not advance			9

== Biathlon ==
Canada qualified eight biathletes (four per gender). Canada's team of eight biathletes was named on January 19, 2022.

Men

Athlete	Event	Time	Misses	Rank
Jules Burnotte	Sprint	25:50.3	2+0	29
Christian Gow	Sprint	25:15.5	0+0	12
Scott Gow	Sprint	25:56.7	1+1	34
Adam Runnalls	Sprint	26:00.5	1+1	35
Jules Burnotte	Pursuit	43:48.2	1+2+1+1	28
Christian Gow	Pursuit	44:10.5	0+2+0+3	35
Scott Gow	Pursuit	43:18.7	0+2+0+2	20
Adam Runnalls	Pursuit	43:59.9	1+0+2+2	30
Jules Burnotte	Individual	52:32.3	1+1+1+0	36
Christian Gow	Individual	52:21.9	0+0+2+0	24
Scott Gow	Individual	49:53.0	0+1+0+0	5
Adam Runnalls	Individual	53:24.7	1+0+0+2	33
Christian Gow	Mass start	41:02.5	0+0+0+3	13
Scott Gow	Mass start	42:17.6	0+4+2+1	25
Jules Burnotte	Mass start	41:35.0	2+1+1+1	18
Jules Burnotte; Christian Gow; Scott Gow; Adam Runnalls	Relay	1:21:46.5	2+9	6

Women

Athlete	Event	Time	Misses	Rank
Megan Bankes	Sprint	24:35.4	1+2	77
Sarah Beaudry	Sprint	24:45.9	1+1	80
Emily Dickson	Sprint	24:50.3	2+1	81
Emma Lunder	Sprint	22:47.6	0+1	32
Emma Lunder	Pursuit	42:19.3	1+3+2+1	54
Megan Bankes	Individual	48:47.2	0+0+0+2	33
Sarah Beaudry	Individual	53:55.0	3+1+1+0	80
Emily Dickson	Individual	52:26.1	2+1+0+2	70
Emma Lunder	Individual	52:02.4	0+2+3+2	67
Megan Bankes; Sarah Beaudry; Emily Dickson; Emma Lunder	Relay	1:15:34.3	0+8	10

Mixed

Athlete	Event	Time	Misses	Rank
Sarah Beaudry; Christian Gow; Scott Gow; Emma Lunder	Relay	1:11:12.4	3+17	14

== Bobsleigh ==
Canada qualified 18 athletes (12 men and six women) and the maximum number of sleds (three in two-man, four-man and two-women, along with two monobobs). The team was officially named on January 20, 2022.

Men

Athletes	Event	Run 1		Run 2		Run 3		Run 4		Total	
Athletes	Event	Time	Rank	Time	Rank	Time	Rank	Time	Rank	Time	Rank
Taylor Austin*; Daniel Sunderland	Two-man	1:00.11	21	1:00.41	21	1:00.29	19	1:00.55	19	4:01.36	20
Justin Kripps*; Cam Stones	Two-man	59.61	8	1:00.08	14	59.71	7	1:00.00	8	3:59.40	10
Mike Evelyn; Christopher Spring*	Two-man	59.54	6	1:00.03	10	59.76	8	59.93	5	3:59.26	7
Taylor Austin*; Jay Dearborn; Chris Patrician; Daniel Sunderland	Four-man	59.67	22	59.81	22	59.79	24	Did not advance			23
Justin Kripps*; Ben Coakwell; Ryan Sommer; Cam Stones	Four-man	58.38	3	59.00	5	58.44	5	59.27	3	3:55.09	3rd place, bronze medalist(s)
Christopher Spring*; Mike Evelyn; Sam Giguère; Cody Sorensen	Four-man	59.10	12	59.33	10	59.10	10	59.46	11	3:56.99	9

* – Denotes the driver of each sled

Women

Athletes	Event	Run 1		Run 2		Run 3		Run 4		Total	
Athletes	Event	Time	Rank	Time	Rank	Time	Rank	Time	Rank	Time	Rank
Cynthia Appiah	Monobob	1:05.75	=12	1:05.53	5	1:05.78	8	1:05.98	9	4:23.04	8
Christine de Bruin	Monobob	1:05.12	=3	1:05.02	2	1:05.38	4	1:05.51	5	4:21.03	3rd place, bronze medalist(s)
Cynthia Appiah*; Dawn Richardson Wilson	Two-woman	1:01.75	8	1:01.89	7	1:01.95	10	1:01.93	9	4:07.52	8
Christine de Bruin*; Kristen Bujnowski	Two-woman	1:01.45	5	1:01.76	4	1:01.43	5	1:01.73	6	4:06.37	5
Melissa Lotholz*; Sara Villani	Two-woman	1:02.12	18	1:02.09	10	1:01.85	8	1:02.31	15	4:08.37	12

* – Denotes the driver of each sled

== Cross-country skiing ==
Canada qualified nine cross-country skiers (four men and five women). The first seven athletes were named on January 13, 2022. All three men and Katherine Stewart-Jones prequalified for the team based on the World Cup circuit. The other three skiers qualified for the team based on results at the National Cross Country Ski Trials held in Canmore, Alberta, between January 6 and 11, 2022. On January 21, 2022, it was confirmed the International Ski Federation (FIS) reallocated two additional quota spots to Canada, allowing Rémi Drolet and Olivia Bouffard-Nesbitt to be named to the team.

Distance
Men

Athlete	Event	Classical		Freestyle		Total	
Athlete	Event	Time	Rank	Time	Rank	Time	Rank
Antoine Cyr	15 km classical	—N/a				41:17.7	37
Rémi Drolet	15 km classical	—N/a				41:07.7	33
Olivier Léveillé	15 km classical	—N/a				40:52.0	29
Antoine Cyr	30 km skiathlon	42:27.3	39	42:25.2	45	1:25:26.0	42
Rémi Drolet	30 km skiathlon	44:39.9	55	LAP			55
Olivier Léveillé	30 km skiathlon	42:07.5	34	41:03.3	36	1:23:42.0	31
Rémi Drolet	50 km freestyle^{1}	—N/a				1:16:21.7	35
Olivier Léveillé	50 km freestyle^{1}	—N/a				1:15:54.3	27
Antoine Cyr; Rémi Drolet; Olivier Léveillé; Graham Ritchie	4 × 10 km relay	—N/a				1:40:21.5	12

^{1} The event was shortened to 28.4 km due to high winds and freezing temperatures.

Women

Athlete	Event	Classical		Freestyle		Total	
Athlete	Event	Time	Rank	Time	Rank	Time	Rank
Dahria Beatty	10 km classical	—N/a				30:00.2	18
Olivia Bouffard-Nesbitt	10 km classical	—N/a				33:01.1	61
Cendrine Browne	10 km classical	—N/a				31:47.9	48
Katherine Stewart-Jones	10 km classical	—N/a				31:08.6	36
Dahria Beatty	15 km skiathlon	24:40.1	34	23:34.7	31	48:52.0	28
Olivia Bouffard-Nesbitt	15 km skiathlon	25:27.3	46	24:11.7	42	50:11.7	44
Cendrine Browne	15 km skiathlon	24:15.7	19	23:08.1	20	47:58.1	20
Katherine Stewart-Jones	15 km skiathlon	24:16.4	20	23:22.7	25	48:17.3	23
Dahria Beatty	30 km freestyle	—N/a				1:32:33.3	39
Cendrine Browne	30 km freestyle	—N/a				1:31:21.6	16
Laura Leclair	30 km freestyle	—N/a				1:40:14.5	51
Katherine Stewart-Jones	30 km freestyle	—N/a				1:32:33.3	30
Dahria Beatty; Olivia Bouffard-Nesbitt; Cendrine Browne; Katherine Stewart-Jones	4 × 5 km relay	—N/a				57:20.9	9

Sprint
Men

Athlete	Event	Qualification		Quarterfinal		Semifinal		Final	
Athlete	Event	Time	Rank	Time	Rank	Time	Rank	Time	Rank
Antoine Cyr	Sprint	3:02.59	56	Did not advance					56
Olivier Léveillé	Sprint	3:02.26	54	Did not advance					54
Graham Ritchie	Sprint	2:55.04	34	Did not advance					34
Antoine Cyr; Graham Ritchie	Team sprint	—N/a				20:18.71	4 Q	19:45.30	5

Women

Athlete	Event	Qualification		Quarterfinal		Semifinal		Final	
Athlete	Event	Time	Rank	Time	Rank	Time	Rank	Time	Rank
Dahria Beatty	Sprint	3:23.54	28 Q	3:18.73	5	Did not advance			25
Olivia Bouffard-Nesbitt	Sprint	3:25.92	40	Did not advance					40
Cendrine Browne	Sprint	3:24.85	35	Did not advance					35
Laura Leclair	Sprint	3:35.31	58	Did not advance					58
Dahria Beatty; Katherine Stewart-Jones	Team sprint	—N/a				24:03.7	6	Did not advance	12

== Curling ==
Canada qualified the maximum of twelve curlers, six men and six women. The men's and women's teams were officially nominated to the team on November 29, 2021. The mixed doubles pair were formally nominate on January 13, 2022. Canada would only go on to win a bronze medal in the men's competition.

Summary

Team	Event	Round robin										Semifinal	Final / BM	
Team	Event	Opposition Score	Opposition Score	Opposition Score	Opposition Score	Opposition Score	Opposition Score	Opposition Score	Opposition Score	Opposition Score	Rank Record	Opposition Score	Opposition Score	Rank
Brad Gushue; Mark Nichols; Brett Gallant; Geoff Walker; Marc Kennedy	Men's	DEN; W 10–5	NOR; W 6–5	SUI; L 3–5	SWE; L 4–7	USA; W 10–5	ITA; W 7–3	CHN; W 10–8	ROC; L 6–7	GBR; L 2–5	3; 5–4	SWE; L 3–5	USA; W 8–5	3rd place, bronze medalist(s)
Jennifer Jones; Kaitlyn Lawes; Jocelyn Peterman; Dawn McEwen; Lisa Weagle	Women's	KOR; W 12–7	JPN; L 5–8	SWE; L 6–7	SUI; L 4–8	ROC; W 11–5	GBR; W 7–3	USA; W 7–6	CHN; L 9–11	DEN; W 10–4	5; 5–4	Did not advance		5
Rachel Homan; John Morris	Mixed doubles	GBR; L 4–6	NOR; W 7–6	SUI; W 7–5	CHN; W 8–6	SWE; L 2–6	USA; W 7–2	CZE; W 6–5	AUS; L 8–10	ITA; L 7–8	5; 5–4	Did not advance		5

=== Men's tournament ===
Canada qualified their men's team (five athletes) by finishing in the top six teams in the 2021 World Men's Curling Championship. Team Brad Gushue, the 2006 Olympic champion, qualified as the Canadian representatives by winning the 2021 Canadian Olympic Curling Trials, defeating Brad Jacobs 4–3 in the final.

Final Round Robin Standings
Team	Skip	Pld	W	L	W–L	PF	PA	EW	EL	BE	SE	S%	DSC	Qualification
Great Britain	Bruce Mouat	9	8	1	–	63	44	39	31	5	10	88.0%	18.81	Playoffs
Sweden	Niklas Edin	9	7	2	–	64	44	43	30	10	11	85.7%	14.02	Playoffs
Canada	Brad Gushue	9	5	4	1–0	58	50	34	38	7	7	84.4%	26.49	Playoffs
United States	John Shuster	9	5	4	0–1	56	61	35	41	4	5	83.0%	32.29	Playoffs
China	Ma Xiuyue	9	4	5	2–1; 1–0	59	62	39	36	6	4	85.4%	23.55	
Norway	Steffen Walstad	9	4	5	2–1; 0–1	58	53	40	36	0	11	84.4%	20.96	
Switzerland	Peter de Cruz	9	4	5	1–2; 1–0	51	54	33	38	13	3	84.5%	15.74	
ROC	Sergey Glukhov	9	4	5	1–2; 0–1	58	58	33	38	6	6	81.2%	33.72	
Italy	Joël Retornaz	9	3	6	–	59	65	36	35	3	8	81.7%	30.76	
Denmark	Mikkel Krause	9	1	8	–	36	71	30	39	3	2	78.1%	32.84	

Round robin
Canada had a bye in draws 3, 7 and 11.

Draw 1
Wednesday, 9 February, 20:05

Sheet A	1	2	3	4	5	6	7	8	9	10	Final
Denmark (Krause) 🔨	0	2	0	2	0	0	1	0	X	X	5
Canada (Gushue)	1	0	3	0	1	2	0	3	X	X	10

Draw 2
Thursday, 10 February, 14:05

Sheet B	1	2	3	4	5	6	7	8	9	10	Final
Norway (Walstad)	0	2	0	0	1	0	0	0	2	0	5
Canada (Gushue) 🔨	2	0	0	1	0	0	0	2	0	1	6

Draw 4
Friday, 11 February, 20:05

Sheet D	1	2	3	4	5	6	7	8	9	10	Final
Canada (Gushue)	0	0	1	0	0	2	0	0	0	X	3
Switzerland (de Cruz) 🔨	1	1	0	0	1	0	0	1	1	X	5

Draw 5
Saturday, 12 February, 14:05

Sheet B	1	2	3	4	5	6	7	8	9	10	Final
Canada (Gushue)	0	0	0	0	2	0	0	2	0	0	4
Sweden (Edin) 🔨	0	1	0	1	0	2	1	0	1	1	7

Draw 6
Sunday, 13 February, 9:05

Sheet C	1	2	3	4	5	6	7	8	9	10	Final
United States (Shuster)	0	0	1	0	0	3	0	1	0	X	5
Canada (Gushue) 🔨	1	4	0	1	1	0	1	0	2	X	10

Draw 8
Monday, 14 February, 14:05

Sheet A	1	2	3	4	5	6	7	8	9	10	Final
Canada (Gushue)	1	0	1	0	0	2	0	0	3	X	7
Italy (Retornaz) 🔨	0	1	0	1	0	0	0	1	0	X	3

Draw 9
Tuesday, 15 February, 9:05

Sheet B	1	2	3	4	5	6	7	8	9	10	Final
Canada (Gushue)	0	2	0	2	0	2	0	3	0	1	10
China (Ma) 🔨	1	0	2	0	2	0	1	0	2	0	8

Draw 10
Tuesday, 15 February, 20:05

Sheet D	1	2	3	4	5	6	7	8	9	10	11	Final
ROC (Glukhov) 🔨	0	1	1	1	0	1	0	0	2	0	1	7
Canada (Gushue)	1	0	0	0	1	0	1	1	0	2	0	6

Draw 12
Thursday, 17 February, 9:05

Sheet C	1	2	3	4	5	6	7	8	9	10	Final
Canada (Gushue)	0	2	0	0	0	0	0	0	X	X	2
Great Britain (Mouat) 🔨	2	0	0	1	0	1	0	1	X	X	5

Semifinal
Thursday, 17 February, 20:05

Sheet A	1	2	3	4	5	6	7	8	9	10	Final
Sweden (Edin) 🔨	0	1	0	2	0	0	0	1	0	1	5
Canada (Gushue)	0	0	1	0	2	0	0	0	0	0	3

Bronze medal game
Friday, 18 February, 14:05

Sheet B	1	2	3	4	5	6	7	8	9	10	Final
Canada (Gushue) 🔨	2	0	1	0	1	0	0	2	2	X	8
United States (Shuster)	0	1	0	2	0	2	0	0	0	X	5

=== Women's tournament ===
Canada qualified their women's team (five athletes) by finishing in the top six teams in the 2021 World Women's Curling Championship. Team Jennifer Jones, the 2014 Olympic champion, qualified as Canadian representatives by winning the 2021 Canadian Olympic Curling Trials, defeating Tracy Fleury 6–5 in the final.

Final Round Robin Standings
Team	Skip	Pld	W	L	W–L	PF	PA	EW	EL	BE	SE	S%	DSC	Qualification
Switzerland	Silvana Tirinzoni	9	8	1	–	67	46	44	36	4	12	81.6%	19.14	Playoffs
Sweden	Anna Hasselborg	9	7	2	–	64	49	39	35	6	12	82.0%	25.02	Playoffs
Great Britain	Eve Muirhead	9	5	4	1–1	63	47	39	33	4	9	80.6%	35.27	Playoffs
Japan	Satsuki Fujisawa	9	5	4	1–1	64	62	40	36	2	13	82.3%	36.00	Playoffs
Canada	Jennifer Jones	9	5	4	1–1	71	59	42	41	1	14	80.4%	45.44	
United States	Tabitha Peterson	9	4	5	2–0	60	64	40	39	2	12	79.5%	33.87	
China	Han Yu	9	4	5	1–1	56	67	38	41	3	10	79.6%	30.06	
South Korea	Kim Eun-jung	9	4	5	0–2	62	66	40	42	3	10	80.8%	27.79	
Denmark	Madeleine Dupont	9	2	7	–	50	68	33	41	7	0	77.2%	23.36	
ROC	Alina Kovaleva	9	1	8	–	50	79	34	45	2	7	78.9%	29.34	

Round robin
Canada had a bye in draws 1, 5 and 9.

Draw 2
Thursday, 10 February, 20:05

Sheet A	1	2	3	4	5	6	7	8	9	10	Final
Canada (Jones)	0	2	0	3	1	0	3	0	1	2	12
South Korea (Kim) 🔨	1	0	3	0	0	2	0	1	0	0	7

Draw 3
Friday, 11 February, 14:05

Sheet B	1	2	3	4	5	6	7	8	9	10	Final
Canada (Jones) 🔨	0	2	0	0	0	2	0	1	0	X	5
Japan (Fujisawa)	1	0	2	1	1	0	2	0	1	X	8

Draw 4
Saturday, 12 February, 9:05

Sheet A	1	2	3	4	5	6	7	8	9	10	Final
Sweden (Hasselborg) 🔨	0	0	2	0	3	0	1	0	1	0	7
Canada (Jones)	1	0	0	1	0	1	0	2	0	1	6

Draw 6
Sunday, 13 February, 14:05

Sheet D	1	2	3	4	5	6	7	8	9	10	Final
Switzerland (Tirinzoni) 🔨	1	1	0	1	0	0	1	2	2	X	8
Canada (Jones)	0	0	1	0	2	1	0	0	0	X	4

Draw 7
Monday, 14 February, 9:05

Sheet C	1	2	3	4	5	6	7	8	9	10	Final
Canada (Jones)	2	2	0	2	0	2	0	1	2	X	11
ROC (Kovaleva) 🔨	0	0	1	0	2	0	2	0	0	X	5

Draw 8
Monday, 14 February, 20:05

Sheet B	1	2	3	4	5	6	7	8	9	10	Final
Great Britain (Muirhead) 🔨	0	0	1	0	0	1	0	1	0	0	3
Canada (Jones)	1	0	0	0	3	0	1	0	1	1	7

Draw 10
Wednesday, 16 February, 9:05

Sheet A	1	2	3	4	5	6	7	8	9	10	Final
Canada (Jones)	0	2	2	0	0	1	1	0	0	1	7
United States (Peterson) 🔨	1	0	0	1	1	0	0	2	1	0	6

Draw 11
Wednesday, 16 February, 20:05

Sheet D	1	2	3	4	5	6	7	8	9	10	11	Final
Canada (Jones) 🔨	0	0	1	2	0	5	0	0	1	0	0	9
China (Han)	1	2	0	0	2	0	2	1	0	1	2	11

Draw 12
Thursday, 17 February, 14:05

Sheet C	1	2	3	4	5	6	7	8	9	10	Final
Denmark (Dupont)	0	1	0	2	0	0	0	1	X	X	4
Canada (Jones) 🔨	1	0	2	0	2	3	2	0	X	X	10

=== Mixed doubles tournament ===
Canada qualified their mixed doubles team (two athletes) by finishing in the top seven teams in the 2021 World Mixed Doubles Curling Championship. On 13 January 2022, Rachel Homan and John Morris were chosen to represent Canada following the cancellation of the 2022 Canadian Mixed Doubles Curling Olympic Trials.

Final Round Robin Standings
Team	Athletes	Pld	W	L	W–L	PF	PA	EW	EL	BE	SE	S%	DSC	Qualification
Italy	Stefania Constantini / Amos Mosaner	9	9	0	–	79	48	43	28	0	17	79%	25.34	Playoffs
Norway	Kristin Skaslien / Magnus Nedregotten	9	6	3	1–0	68	50	40	28	0	15	82%	24.48	Playoffs
Great Britain	Jennifer Dodds / Bruce Mouat	9	6	3	0–1	60	50	38	33	0	12	79%	22.48	Playoffs
Sweden	Almida de Val / Oskar Eriksson	9	5	4	1–0	55	54	35	33	0	10	76%	21.77	Playoffs
Canada	Rachel Homan / John Morris	9	5	4	0–1	57	54	33	39	0	8	78%	53.73	
Czech Republic	Zuzana Paulová / Tomáš Paul	9	4	5	–	50	65	29	39	1	7	75%	33.41	
Switzerland	Jenny Perret / Martin Rios	9	3	6	1–0	55	58	32	39	0	6	73%	39.04	
United States	Vicky Persinger / Chris Plys	9	3	6	0–1	50	67	34	36	0	9	74%	27.29	
China	Fan Suyuan / Ling Zhi	9	2	7	1–0	51	64	34	36	0	7	74%	17.81	
Australia	Tahli Gill / Dean Hewitt	9	2	7	0–1	52	67	31	38	1	8	72%	50.51	

Round robin
Canada had a bye in draws 1, 3, 7 and 10.

Draw 2
Thursday, 3 February, 9:05

Sheet D	1	2	3	4	5	6	7	8	Final
Great Britain (Dodds / Mouat)	0	1	1	0	1	0	2	1	6
Canada (Homan / Morris) 🔨	1	0	0	1	0	2	0	0	4

Draw 4
Thursday, 3 February, 20:05

Sheet A	1	2	3	4	5	6	7	8	Final
Norway (Skaslien / Nedregotten) 🔨	2	0	1	0	2	0	1	0	6
Canada (Homan / Morris)	0	4	0	1	0	1	0	1	7

Draw 5
Friday, 4 February, 8:35

Sheet C	1	2	3	4	5	6	7	8	Final
Canada (Homan / Morris)	3	0	1	0	2	0	1	0	7
Switzerland (Perret / Rios) 🔨	0	1	0	1	0	2	0	1	5

Draw 6
Friday, 4 February, 13:35

Sheet B	1	2	3	4	5	6	7	8	Final
China (Fan / Ling) 🔨	1	0	0	2	0	1	0	2	6
Canada (Homan / Morris)	0	2	2	0	2	0	2	0	8

Draw 8
Saturday, 5 February, 14:05

Sheet C	1	2	3	4	5	6	7	8	Final
Sweden (de Val / Eriksson)	1	1	0	3	0	1	X	X	6
Canada (Homan / Morris) 🔨	0	0	1	0	1	0	X	X	2

Draw 9
Saturday, 5 February, 20:05

Sheet D	1	2	3	4	5	6	7	8	Final
United States (Persinger / Plys) 🔨	1	0	1	0	0	0	0	X	2
Canada (Homan / Morris)	0	1	0	1	1	1	3	X	7

Draw 11
Sunday, 6 February, 14:05

Sheet D	1	2	3	4	5	6	7	8	9	Final
Canada (Homan / Morris)	0	1	0	1	1	0	0	2	2	7
Czech Republic (Paulová / Paul) 🔨	1	0	1	0	0	2	1	0	0	5

Draw 12
Sunday, 6 February, 20:05

Sheet A	1	2	3	4	5	6	7	8	9	Final
Canada (Homan / Morris)	0	0	0	0	4	0	3	1	0	8
Australia (Gill / Hewitt) 🔨	3	2	1	1	0	1	0	0	2	10

Draw 13
Monday, 7 February, 9:05

Sheet B	1	2	3	4	5	6	7	8	9	Final
Canada (Homan / Morris)	0	2	0	0	2	0	3	0	0	7
Italy (Constantini / Mosaner) 🔨	1	0	1	2	0	1	0	2	1	8

== Figure skating ==
Canada qualified 13 figure skaters (seven men and six women). At the 2021 World Figure Skating Championships in Stockholm, Sweden, Canada qualified one entry in the men's and women's singles. In the pairs event, Canada qualified two entries (four athletes) and three entries (six athletes) in the ice dance. Later, in 2021, at the 2021 CS Nebelhorn Trophy in Oberstdorf, Germany, Canada qualified an additional berth in the men's singles. The final team of 13 athletes was named on January 9, 2021, after the conclusion of the 2022 Canadian Figure Skating Championships.

Singles

Athlete	Event	SP		FS		Total	
Athlete	Event	Points	Rank	Points	Rank	Points	Rank
Keegan Messing	Men's	93.24	9 Q	172.37	10	265.61	11
Roman Sadovsky	Men's	62.77	29	Did not advance			29
Madeline Schizas	Women's	60.53	20 Q	115.03	18	175.56	19

Mixed

Athletes	Event	SP / RD		FS / FD		Total	
Athletes	Event	Points	Rank	Points	Rank	Points	Rank
Vanessa James; Eric Radford	Pairs	63.03	12 Q	117.96	12	180.99	12
Kirsten Moore-Towers; Michael Marinaro	Pairs	62.51	13 Q	118.86	10	181.37	10
Laurence Fournier Beaudry; Nikolaj Sørensen	Ice dance	78.54	8 Q	113.81	11	192.35	9
Piper Gilles; Paul Poirier	Ice dance	83.52	6 Q	121.26	7	204.78	7
Marjorie Lajoie; Zachary Lagha	Ice dance	72.59	13 Q	108.43	13	181.02	13

Team event

Athlete	Event	Short program / Rhythm dance						Free skate / Free dance				Total	
Athlete	Event	Men's	Women's	Pairs	Ice dance	Total		Men's	Women's	Pairs	Ice dance	Total	
Athlete	Event	Points Team points	Points Team points	Points Team points	Points Team points	Points	Rank	Points Team points	Points Team points	Points Team points	Points Team points	Points	Rank
Roman Sadovsky (M); Madeline Schizas (W); Kirsten Moore-Towers (P) (SP); Michael Marinaro (P) (SP); Vanessa James (P) (FS); Eric Radford (P) (FS); Piper Gilles (ID); Paul Poirier (ID)	Team event	71.06; 3	69.60; 8	67.34; 6	82.72; 7	24	4 Q	122.60; 6	132.04; 8	130.07; 7	124.39; 8	53	4

== Freestyle skiing ==
Canada qualified the maximum quota of 16 male and 16 female freestyle skiers. On January 21, 2022, the ski cross team of eight athletes was named. The rest of the team was named on January 24, 2022.

Aerials
Individual

Athlete	Event	Qualification				Final			
Athlete	Event	Jump 1		Jump 2		Jump 1		Jump 2	
Athlete	Event	Points	Rank	Points	Rank	Points	Rank	Points	Rank
Miha Fontaine	Men's aerials	115.05	11	107.69	7	Did not advance			13
Lewis Irving	Men's aerials	103.98	19	80.99	17	Did not advance			23
Émile Nadeau	Men's aerials	112.83	13	102.26	11	Did not advance			17
Flavie Aumond	Women's aerials	76.86	18	73.95	13	Did not advance			19
Naomy Boudreau-Guertin	Women's aerials	77.43	16	77.43	12	Did not advance			18
Marion Thénault	Women's aerials	93.06	5 Q	Bye		91.29	7	Did not advance	7

Mixed

Athlete	Event	Jump 1					Jump 2				
Athlete	Event	Points	Points	Points	Total	Rank	Points	Points	Points	Total	Rank
Marion Thénault; Miha Fontaine; Lewis Irving	Mixed team aerials	93.06	113.97	119.91	326.94	3 Q	62.74	116.48	111.76	290.98	3rd place, bronze medalist(s)

Freeskiing
Men

Athlete	Event	Qualification					Final				
Athlete	Event	Run 1	Run 2	Run 3	Best	Rank	Run 1	Run 2	Run 3	Best	Rank
Teal Harle	Big air	26.50	24.25	20.25	46.75	31	Did not advance				31
Evan McEachran	Big air	81.75	88.50	39.75	170.25	11 Q	93.00	22.50	11.50	115.50	9
Max Moffatt	Big air	83.00	64.00	61.00	147.00	20	Did not advance				20
Édouard Therriault	Big air	83.50	42.00	84.50	168.00	13	Did not advance				13
Noah Bowman	Halfpipe	78.25	85.50	—N/a	85.50	6 Q	84.25	84.75	21.25	84.75	4
Simon d'Artois	Halfpipe	82.50	68.25	—N/a	82.50	8 Q	7.25	7.00	63.75	63.75	10
Brendan Mackay	Halfpipe	87.25	85.00	—N/a	87.25	5 Q	4.00	65.50	27.00	65.50	9
Teal Harle	Slopestyle	36.05	33.81	—N/a	36.05	26	Did not advance				26
Evan McEachran	Slopestyle	40.90	33.70	—N/a	40.90	24	Did not advance				24
Max Moffatt	Slopestyle	74.06	35.16	—N/a	74.06	11 Q	47.18	65.31	70.40	70.40	9
Édouard Therriault	Slopestyle	70.40	23.75	—N/a	70.40	13	Did not advance				13

Women
Elena Gaskell withdrew from the big air event after sustaining an injury in training.

Athlete	Event	Qualification					Final				
Athlete	Event	Run 1	Run 2	Run 3	Best	Rank	Run 1	Run 2	Run 3	Best	Rank
Olivia Asselin	Big air	60.75	87.00	16.00	147.75	11 Q	62.00	60.25	85.00	147.50	8
Elena Gaskell	Big air	DNS					Did not advance				
Megan Oldham	Big air	80.00	91.25	8.25	171.25	1 Q	85.00	89.25	88.75	178.00	4
Amy Fraser	Halfpipe	75.25	75.75	—N/a	75.75	11 Q	75.25	35.75	11.00	75.25	8
Rachael Karker	Halfpipe	88.50	89.50	—N/a	89.50	2 Q	87.75	85.25	38.00	87.75	3rd place, bronze medalist(s)
Cassie Sharpe	Halfpipe	86.25	79.00	—N/a	86.25	6 Q	89.00	90.00	90.75	90.75	2nd place, silver medalist(s)
Olivia Asselin	Slopestyle	64.68	6.75	—N/a	64.68	11 Q	16.83	DNS		16.83	11
Megan Oldham	Slopestyle	6.45	63.10	—N/a	63.10	13	Did not advance				13

Moguls

Athlete	Event	Qualification								Final											
Athlete	Event	Run 1				Run 2				Run 1				Run 2				Run 3			Rank
Athlete	Event	Time	Points	Total	Rank	Time	Points	Total	Rank	Time	Points	Total	Rank	Time	Points	Total	Rank	Time	Points	Total	Rank
Mikaël Kingsbury	Men's moguls	24.71	65.74	81.15	1 Q	Bye				25.30	67.14	81.78	1 Q	25.50	65.22	79.59	2 Q	25.02	67.17	82.18	2nd place, silver medalist(s)
Laurent Dumais	Men's moguls	24.52	54.09	69.76	24	25.32	46.78	71.39	16	Did not advance											26
Chloé Dufour-Lapointe	Women's moguls	28.85	54.82	70.31	11	28.77	54.87	70.45	6 Q	28.93	58.20	73.60	12 Q	28.65	57.25	72.96	9	Did not advance			9
Justine Dufour-Lapointe	Women's moguls	29.29	56.46	71.45	10 Q	Bye				DNF				Did not advance							20
Sofiane Gagnon	Women's moguls	28.61	52.71	68.47	14	28.39	59.62	75.63	1 Q	28.36	58.40	74.44	8 Q	DNF				Did not advance			12

Ski cross
Men

Athlete	Event	Seeding		Round of 16	Quarterfinal	Semifinal	Final	
Athlete	Event	Time	Rank	Position	Position	Position	Position	Rank
Kevin Drury	Ski cross	1:13.11	15 Q	2 Q	3	Did not advance		12
Reece Howden	Ski cross	1:12.37	5 Q	1 Q	3	Did not advance		9
Brady Leman	Ski cross	1:12.30	4 Q	2 Q	2 Q	4 QB	2	6
Jared Schmidt	Ski cross	1:12.39	6 Q	2 Q	3	Did not advance		10

Women

Athlete	Event	Seeding		Round of 16	Quarterfinal	Semifinal	Final	
Athlete	Event	Time	Rank	Position	Position	Position	Position	Rank
Courtney Hoffos	Ski cross	1:18.28	8	1 Q	2 Q	4 FB	2	6
Brittany Phelan	Ski cross	1:18.17	7	1 Q	2 Q	3 FB	1	5
Hannah Schmidt	Ski cross	1:18.07	4	1 Q	2 Q	3 FB	3	7
Marielle Thompson	Ski cross	1:18.16	5	1 Q	1 Q	2 FA	2	2nd place, silver medalist(s)

Qualification legend: FA – Qualify to medal round; FB – Qualify to consolation round

== Ice hockey ==
Canada qualified 25 male and 23 female competitors in hockey, for a total of 48 athletes.

Summary

Key:

- OT – Overtime
- GWS – Match decided by penalty-shootout

Team	Event	Group Stage					Qualification playoff	Quarterfinal	Semifinal	Final / BM	
Team	Event	Opposition Score	Opposition Score	Opposition Score	Opposition Score	Rank	Opposition Score	Opposition Score	Opposition Score	Opposition Score	Rank
Canada men's	Men's	Germany; W 5–1	United States; L 2–4	China; W 5–0	—N/a	2	China; W 7–2	Sweden; L 0–2	Did not advance		6
Canada women's	Women's	Switzerland; W 12–1	Finland; W 11–1	ROC; W 6–1	United States; W 4–2	1	—N/a	Sweden; W 11–0	Switzerland; W 10–3	United States; W 3–2	1st place, gold medalist(s)

=== Men's tournament ===
Canada men's national ice hockey team qualified by being ranked 1st in the 2019 IIHF World Rankings.

Roster Head coach: Claude Julien

No.	Pos.	Name	Height	Weight	Birthdate	Team
1	G	Devon Levi	6 ft 0 in (183 cm)	185 lb (84 kg)	December 27, 2001 (aged 20)	(United States) Northeastern Huskies
3	D	Brandon Gormley	6 ft 2 in (188 cm)	196 lb (89 kg)	February 18, 1992 (aged 29)	(Russia) Lokomotiv Yaroslavl
5	D	Morgan Ellis	6 ft 2 in (188 cm)	207 lb (94 kg)	April 30, 1992 (aged 29)	(Germany) Eisbären Berlin
7	F	Daniel Carr	6 ft 0 in (183 cm)	194 lb (88 kg)	November 1, 1991 (aged 30)	(Switzerland) HC Lugano
9	F	Corban Knight	6 ft 1 in (185 cm)	196 lb (89 kg)	September 10, 1990 (aged 31)	(Russia) Avangard Omsk
10	F	Ben Street	6 ft 0 in (183 cm)	190 lb (86 kg)	February 13, 1987 (aged 34)	(Germany) EHC Red Bull München
11	F	Jack McBain	6 ft 3 in (191 cm)	201 lb (91 kg)	January 6, 2000 (aged 22)	(United States) Boston College Eagles
12	F	Eric Staal (C)	6 ft 4 in (193 cm)	194 lb (88 kg)	October 29, 1984 (aged 37)	(United States) Iowa Wild
13	F	Kent Johnson	6 ft 1 in (185 cm)	165 lb (75 kg)	October 18, 2002 (aged 19)	(United States) Michigan Wolverines
15	F	Adam Tambellini	6 ft 4 in (193 cm)	194 lb (88 kg)	November 1, 1994 (aged 27)	(Sweden) Rögle BK
19	F	Eric O'Dell	6 ft 0 in (183 cm)	205 lb (93 kg)	June 21, 1990 (aged 31)	(Russia) HC Dynamo Moscow
20	D	Alex Grant	6 ft 3 in (191 cm)	209 lb (95 kg)	January 20, 1989 (aged 33)	(Finland) Jokerit
22	D	Owen Power	6 ft 6 in (198 cm)	214 lb (97 kg)	November 22, 2002 (aged 19)	(United States) Michigan Wolverines
23	D	Tyler Wotherspoon	6 ft 2 in (188 cm)	207 lb (94 kg)	March 12, 1993 (aged 28)	(United States) Utica Comets
26	F	Daniel Winnik	6 ft 2 in (188 cm)	209 lb (95 kg)	March 6, 1985 (aged 36)	(Switzerland) Genève-Servette HC
27	F	Adam Cracknell	6 ft 3 in (191 cm)	209 lb (95 kg)	July 15, 1985 (aged 36)	(United States) Bakersfield Condors
32	F	Mason McTavish	6 ft 1 in (185 cm)	207 lb (94 kg)	January 30, 2003 (aged 19)	(Canada) Hamilton Bulldogs
37	D	Mat Robinson	5 ft 9 in (175 cm)	181 lb (82 kg)	January 20, 1986 (aged 36)	(Russia) SKA Saint Petersburg
39	F	Landon Ferraro	6 ft 0 in (183 cm)	176 lb (80 kg)	August 8, 1991 (aged 30)	(Germany) Kölner Haie
44	D	Mark Barberio	6 ft 1 in (185 cm)	207 lb (94 kg)	March 23, 1990 (aged 31)	(Russia) Ak Bars Kazan
51	F	David Desharnais (A)	5 ft 7 in (170 cm)	176 lb (80 kg)	September 14, 1986 (aged 35)	(Switzerland) HC Fribourg-Gottéron
56	D	Maxim Noreau (A)	5 ft 11 in (180 cm)	196 lb (89 kg)	May 24, 1987 (aged 34)	(Switzerland) ZSC Lions
60	D	Jason Demers	6 ft 1 in (185 cm)	194 lb (88 kg)	June 9, 1988 (aged 33)	(Russia) Ak Bars Kazan
80	G	Edward Pasquale	6 ft 3 in (191 cm)	218 lb (99 kg)	November 20, 1990 (aged 31)	(Russia) Lokomotiv Yaroslavl
90	G	Matt Tomkins	6 ft 3 in (191 cm)	194 lb (88 kg)	June 19, 1994 (aged 27)	(Sweden) Frölunda HC
91	F	Jordan Weal	5 ft 10 in (178 cm)	179 lb (81 kg)	April 15, 1992 (aged 29)	(Russia) Ak Bars Kazan
96	F	Josh Ho-Sang	6 ft 0 in (183 cm)	172 lb (78 kg)	January 22, 1996 (aged 26)	(Canada) Toronto Marlies

Group A

Pos	Team	Pld	W	OTW	OTL	L	GF	GA	GD	Pts	Qualification
1	United States	3	3	0	0	0	15	4	+11	9	Quarterfinals
2	Canada	3	2	0	0	1	12	5	+7	6	Playoffs
3	Germany	3	1	0	0	2	6	10	−4	3	Playoffs
4	China (H)	3	0	0	0	3	2	16	−14	0	Playoffs

Source: IIHF
Rules for classification: Preliminary round tiebreakers
(H) Host

February 10, 2022; 21:10 v	Canada	5–1 (3–0, 1–1, 1–0)	Germany	Wukesong Arena, Beijing; Attendance: 685

Game reference

Edward Pasquale
Goalies
Mathias Niederberger
Referees:
(Sweden) Tobias Björk
(United States) Andrew Bruggeman
Linesmen:
(Czech Republic) Daniel Hynek
(Russia) Gleb Lazarev

Grant (Johnson, Street) – 04:43	1–0
Street (O'Dell, Johnson) – 09:47	2–0
Winnik (Cracknell, Desharnais) – 10:19	3–0
	3–1	30:45 – Rieder (Pföderl)
Noreau (O'Dell, Staal) (PP) – 32:58	4–1
Weal (Tambellini, Knight) – 51:22	5–1

8 min
Penalties
4 min
27
Shots
24

February 12, 2022; 12:10 v	Canada	2–4 (1–2, 1–1, 0–1)	United States	Beijing National Indoor Stadium, Beijing; Attendance: 948

Game reference

Edward Pasquale
Goalies
Strauss Mann
Referees:
(Latvia) Andris Ansons
(Sweden) Tobias Björk
Linesmen:
(Czech Republic) Daniel Hynek
(Canada) Dustin McCrank

Robinson (Ho-Sang, Staal) – 01:24	1–0
	1–1	02:34 – Miele (O'Neill, Kampfer)
	1–2	18:44 – Meyers (Farrell, Sanderson)
	1–3	22:37 – Brisson (Shore)
Knight (Winnik) (SH) – 34:13	2–3
	2–4	46:13 – Agostino (Miele)

4 min
Penalties
6 min
37
Shots
27

February 13, 2022; 21:10 v	China	0–5 (0–3, 0–1, 0–1)	Canada	Beijing National Indoor Stadium, Beijing; Attendance: 904

Game reference

Paris O'Brien
Goalies
Matt Tomkins
Referees:
(Latvia) Andris Ansons
(United States) Andrew Bruggeman
Linesmen:
(Czech Republic) Daniel Hynek
(Russia) Gleb Lazarev

0–1	02:09 – Street (Johnson, O'Dell)
0–2	06:44 – Tambellini (Grant, Wotherspoon)
0–3	10:06 – O'Dell (Ho-Sang, Wotherspoon)
0–4	38:03 – Johnson (Demers, Weal)
0–5	46:23 – Knight (Power, Ho-Sang) (PP)

10 min
Penalties
10 min
26
Shots
44

Qualification playoff

February 15, 2022; 21:10 v	Canada	7–2 (2–1, 3–1, 2–0)	China	Beijing National Indoor Stadium, Beijing; Attendance: 994

Game reference

Matt Tomkins
Goalies
Jeremy Smith
Paris O'Brien
Referees:
(Switzerland) Michael Tscherrig
(Finland) Kristian Vikman
Linesmen:
(Switzerland) David Obwegeser
(Czech Republic) Jiří Ondráček

Weal (Tambellini, Noreau) (PP) – 06:57	1–0
Weal (Staal, Tambellini) (PP2) – 09:55	2–0
	2–1	15:32 – Kane (Werek)
Tambellini (Noreau, Weal) (PP) – 26:36	3–1
Tambellini (PS) – 28:39	4–1
O'Dell (Demers, Johnson) – 32:05	5–1
	5–2	38:59 – Kane (Lockhart, Chelios) (PP2)
Staal (McTavish, McBain) – 55:55	6–2
McBain (Noreau, Tambellini) (PP) – 58:19	7–2

15 min
Penalties
18 min
45
Shots
29

Quarterfinal

February 16, 2022; 21:30 v	Sweden	2–0 (0–0, 0–0, 2–0)	Canada	Beijing National Indoor Stadium, Beijing; Attendance: 950

Game reference
Lars Johansson	Goalies	Matt Tomkins	Referees: (United States) Andrew Bruggeman (Russia) Evgenii Romasko; Linesmen: (United States) William Hancock (Russia) Gleb Lazarev
Wallmark – 50:15 / 1–0; Lander (Holmberg) (ENG) – 58:10 / 2–0			Referees: (United States) Andrew Bruggeman (Russia) Evgenii Romasko; Linesmen: (United States) William Hancock (Russia) Gleb Lazarev
6 min	Penalties	6 min	Referees: (United States) Andrew Bruggeman (Russia) Evgenii Romasko; Linesmen: (United States) William Hancock (Russia) Gleb Lazarev
26	Shots	22	Referees: (United States) Andrew Bruggeman (Russia) Evgenii Romasko; Linesmen: (United States) William Hancock (Russia) Gleb Lazarev

=== Women's tournament ===
Canada women's national ice hockey team qualified by being ranked 2nd in the 2020 IIHF World Rankings.

Roster

Canada's women's hockey team of 23 athletes was named on 11 January 2022. The team consisted of 13 forwards (F), seven on defense (D) and three goaltenders (G).

Head coach: Troy Ryan

No.	Pos.	Name	Height	Weight	Birthdate	Team
3	D	Jocelyne Larocque	1.68 m (5 ft 6 in)	66 kg (146 lb)	19 May 1988 (aged 33)	(Canada) PWHPA Toronto
6	F	Rebecca Johnston	1.75 m (5 ft 9 in)	67 kg (148 lb)	24 September 1989 (aged 32)	(Canada) PWHPA Calgary
7	F	Laura Stacey	1.78 m (5 ft 10 in)	71 kg (157 lb)	5 May 1994 (aged 27)	(Canada) PWHPA Montreal
10	F	Sarah Fillier	1.63 m (5 ft 4 in)	59 kg (130 lb)	9 June 2000 (aged 21)	(United States) Princeton Tigers
11	F	Jillian Saulnier	1.65 m (5 ft 5 in)	66 kg (146 lb)	7 March 1992 (aged 29)	(Canada) PWHPA Montreal
14	D	Renata Fast	1.70 m (5 ft 7 in)	65 kg (143 lb)	6 October 1994 (aged 27)	(Canada) PWHPA Toronto
15	F	Mélodie Daoust	1.63 m (5 ft 4 in)	71 kg (157 lb)	7 January 1992 (aged 30)	(Canada) PWHPA Montreal
17	D	Ella Shelton	1.73 m (5 ft 8 in)	68 kg (150 lb)	19 January 1998 (aged 24)	(Canada) PWHPA Toronto
19	F	Brianne Jenner – A	1.75 m (5 ft 9 in)	71 kg (157 lb)	4 May 1991 (aged 30)	(Canada) PWHPA Toronto
20	F	Sarah Nurse	1.75 m (5 ft 9 in)	67 kg (148 lb)	4 January 1995 (aged 27)	(Canada) PWHPA Toronto
21	D	Ashton Bell	1.73 m (5 ft 8 in)	64 kg (141 lb)	7 December 1999 (aged 22)	(United States) Minnesota Duluth Bulldogs
23	D	Erin Ambrose	1.65 m (5 ft 5 in)	60 kg (130 lb)	30 April 1994 (aged 27)	(Canada) PWHPA Toronto
24	F	Natalie Spooner	1.78 m (5 ft 10 in)	82 kg (181 lb)	17 October 1990 (aged 31)	(Canada) PWHPA Toronto
26	F	Emily Clark	1.70 m (5 ft 7 in)	61 kg (134 lb)	28 November 1995 (aged 26)	(Canada) PWHPA Montreal
27	F	Emma Maltais	1.63 m (5 ft 4 in)	66 kg (146 lb)	4 November 1999 (aged 22)	(United States) Ohio State Buckeyes
28	D	Micah Zandee-Hart	1.73 m (5 ft 8 in)	68 kg (150 lb)	13 January 1997 (aged 25)	(Canada) PWHPA Calgary
29	F	Marie-Philip Poulin – C	1.70 m (5 ft 7 in)	73 kg (161 lb)	28 March 1991 (aged 30)	(Canada) PWHPA Montreal
35	G	Ann-Renée Desbiens	1.75 m (5 ft 9 in)	73 kg (161 lb)	10 April 1994 (aged 27)	(Canada) PWHPA Montreal
38	G	Emerance Maschmeyer	1.68 m (5 ft 6 in)	64 kg (141 lb)	5 October 1994 (aged 27)	(Canada) PWHPA Montreal
40	F	Blayre Turnbull – A	1.70 m (5 ft 7 in)	69 kg (152 lb)	15 July 1993 (aged 28)	(Canada) PWHPA Calgary
42	D	Claire Thompson	1.72 m (5 ft 8 in)	60 kg (130 lb)	28 January 1998 (aged 24)	(Canada) PWHPA Toronto
47	F	Jamie Lee Rattray	1.68 m (5 ft 6 in)	78 kg (172 lb)	30 September 1992 (aged 29)	(Canada) PWHPA Toronto
50	G	Kristen Campbell	1.78 m (5 ft 10 in)	80 kg (180 lb)	30 November 1997 (aged 24)	(Canada) PWHPA Calgary

Group A

Pos	Team	Pld	W	OTW	OTL	L	GF	GA	GD	Pts	Qualification
1	Canada	4	4	0	0	0	33	5	+28	12	Quarterfinals
2	United States	4	3	0	0	1	20	6	+14	9	Quarterfinals
3	Finland	4	1	0	0	3	10	19	−9	3 (Note: Finland 3 Pts, +4 GD; ROC 3 Pts, −2 GD; Switzerland 3 Pts, −2 GD. ROC defeated Switzerland 5–2.)	Quarterfinals
4	ROC	4	1	0	0	3	6	18	−12	3	Quarterfinals
5	Switzerland	4	1	0	0	3	6	27	−21	3	Quarterfinals

Source: IIHF
Rules for classification: Tiebreakers
Notes:

3 February 2022; 12:10 v	Canada	12–1 (3–0, 5–0, 4–1)	Switzerland	Beijing National Indoor Stadium, Beijing; Attendance: 821

Game reference

Ann-Renée Desbiens
Goalies
Andrea Brändli
Referees:
(Russia) Daria Ermak
(Switzerland) Anna Wiegand
Linesmen:
(Germany) Lisa Linnek
(Finland) Linnea Sainio

Fillier (Spooner) – 01:04	1–0
Fillier (Poulin) – 07:55	2–0
Spooner (Fillier, Ambrose) – 11:20	3–0
Johnston (Thompson, Turnbull) – 28:06	4–0
Stacey (Bell) – 28:21	5–0
Spooner (Nurse, Thompson) (PP) – 33:20	6–0
Turnbull (Thompson, Johnston) – 35:40	7–0
Stacey (Shelton) – 37:02	8–0
Turnbull (Rattray, Spooner) – 46:14	9–0
	9–1	48:30 – Stalder (Christen) (PP2)
Bell (Turnbull, Johnston) – 53:46	10–1
Thompson (Johnston, Nurse) – 56:20	11–1
Ambrose (Spooner, Thompson) (PP) – 59:58	12–1

14 min
Penalties
8 min
70
Shots
15

5 February 2022; 12:10 v	Canada	11–1 (2–1, 5–0, 4–0)	Finland	Wukesong Arena, Beijing; Attendance: 670

Game reference

Ann-Renée Desbiens
Goalies
Meeri Räisänen
Anni Keisala
Referees:
(United States) Chelsea Rapin
(Switzerland) Anna Wiegand
Linesmen:
(Germany) Lisa Linnek
(Sweden) Veronica Lovensnö

Fillier (Spooner, Thompson) – 01:01	1–0
Nurse – 12:45	2–0
	2–1	18:27 – Tuominen
Fillier (Fast, Spooner) – 23:22	3–1
Nurse (Spooner, Rattray) – 30:01	4–1
Jenner (Larocque, Poulin) – 31:20	5–1
Jenner (Zandee-Hart, Poulin) – 34:27	6–1
Stacey (Maltais, Shelton) – 36:35	7–1
Rattray (Jenner, Bell) – 47:06	8–1
Nurse (Ambrose, Spooner) – 53:07	9–1
Stacey (Shelton, Bell) – 54:10	10–1
Jenner (Clark, Poulin) – 54:45	11–1

14 min
Penalties
8 min
48
Shots
29

7 February 2022; 13:15 v	ROC	1–6 (0–2, 1–2, 0–2)	Canada	Wukesong Arena, Beijing; Attendance: 545

Game reference

Daria Gredzen
Maria Sorokina
Goalies
Emerance Maschmeyer
Referees:
(Russia) Daria Ermak
(United States) Chelsea Rapin
Linesmen:
(Sweden) Veronica Lovensnö
(Finland) Linnea Sainio

	0–1	02:09 – Nurse
	0–2	02:29 – Fillier (Fast, Rattray)
	0–3	27:45 – Rattray (Spooner, Nurse) (PP)
	0–4	30:29 – Ambrose (Johnston, Stacey)
Shokhina (Vafina) – 37:21	1–4
	1–5	40:39 – Johnston (Jenner, Poulin) (PP)
	1–6	45:50 – Poulin (Jenner, Ambrose) (PP)

14 min
Penalties
8 min
12
Shots
49

8 February 2022; 12:10 v	United States	2–4 (0–1, 2–3, 0–0)	Canada	Wukesong Arena, Beijing; Attendance: 591

Game reference

Maddie Rooney
Goalies
Ann-Renée Desbiens
Referees:
(Canada) Cianna Lieffers
(Canada) Lacey Senuk
(Canada) Elizabeth Mantha
Linesmen:
(United States) Kendall Hanley
(United States) Jacqueline Spresser

	0–1	14:10 – Jenner (Fillier, Poulin) (PP)
Cameranesi (Pannek, Barnes) – 29:17	1–1
Carpenter (Kessel, Keller) (PP) – 31:34	2–1
	2–2	32:00 – Jenner (Nurse)
	2–3	34:25 – Rattray (Spooner, Zandee-Hart)
	2–4	37:25 – Poulin (PS)

2 min
Penalties
12 min
53
Shots
27

Quarterfinals

11 February 2022; 21:10 v	Canada	11–0 (4–0, 5–0, 2–0)	Sweden	Wukesong Arena, Beijing; Attendance: 669

Game reference

Emerance Maschmeyer
Goalies
Emma Söderberg
Ida Boman
Referees:
(Russia) Daria Abrosimova
(Canada) Lacey Senuk
Linesmen:
(Canada) Alex Clarke
(Austria) Julia Kainberger

Jenner (Poulin, Nurse) – 03:05	1–0
Fillier (Johnston, Poulin) (PP) – 17:05	2–0
Fillier (Rattray, Fast) – 17:41	3–0
Rattray (Thompson, Nurse) (PP) – 19:35	4–0
Spooner (Nurse, Larocque) (PP) – 23:16	5–0
Ambrose (Poulin, Thompson) – 25:15	6–0
Turnbull (Ambrose, Saulnier) – 26:56	7–0
Jenner (Poulin, Nurse) – 28:13	8–0
Clark (Bell, Hart) (PP) – 29:09	9–0
Jenner (Hart, Thompson) – 50:55	10–0
Fillier (Spooner, Fast) – 52:06	11–0

8 min
Penalties
14 min
56
Shots
11

Semifinals

14 February 2022; 12:10 v	Canada	10–3 (5–1, 3–2, 2–0)	Switzerland	Wukesong Arena, Beijing; Attendance: 645

Game reference

Ann-Renee Desbiens
Goalies
Andrea Brändli
Saskia Maurer
Referees:
(Finland) Anniina Nurmi
(United States) Chelsea Rapin
Linesmen:
(Finland) Jenni Hekkinen
(United States) Jackie Spresser

Thompson (Johnston) – 07:16	1–0
Rattray (Ambrose, Fillier) – 08:28	2–0
Turnbull (Thompson, Johnston) – 09:04	3–0
Fast (Nurse, Jenner) – 09:21	4–0
Ambrose (Daoust, Spooner) – 10:40	5–0
	5–1	18:37 – Stalder (Müller) (PP)
	5–2	24:59 – Müller (Stalder)
Poulin (Nurse) – 27:52	6–2
Clark (Johnston, Turnbull) – 28:03	7–2
	7–3	29:44 – Stalder (PP)
Poulin (Nurse, Thompson) – 33:27	8–3
Maltais (Stacey, Saulnier) – 43:13	9–3
Jenner (Nurse) – 58:11	10–3

8 min
Penalties
4 min
61
Shots
13

Gold medal game

17 February 2022; 12:10	Canada	3–2 (2–0, 1–1, 0–1)	United States	Wukesong Arena, Beijing; Attendance: 834

Game reference

Ann-Renee Desbiens
Goalies
Alex Cavallini
Referees:
(United States) Kelly Cooke
(Switzerland) Anna Wiegand
Linesmen:
(Sweden) Anna Hammar
(United States) Kendall Hanley

Nurse (Thompson, Poulin) – 07:50	1–0
Poulin – 15:02	2–0
Poulin (Jenner, Nurse) – 29:08	3–0
	3–1	36:39 – Knight (Brandt) (SH)
	3–2	59:47 – Kessel (Roque, Carpenter) (PP, EA)

6 min
Penalties
4 min
21
Shots
40

== Luge ==
Canada qualified a total of six lugers. Canada qualified one men's and three women's entries and a men's doubles entry over the 2021–22 Luge World Cup. Qualifying at least one sled in each discipline also qualified Canada for the team relay. The team was officially named on January 18, 2022.

Athlete	Event	Run 1		Run 2		Run 3		Run 4		Total	
Athlete	Event	Time	Rank	Time	Rank	Time	Rank	Time	Rank	Time	Rank
Reid Watts	Men's singles	58.049	14	59.071	25	58.108	15	58.065	16	3:53.293	17
Tristan Walker; Justin Snith	Open doubles	58.895	7	59.023	8	—N/a				1:57.918	7
Natalie Corless	Women's singles	59.193	15	59.316	17	59.176	21	59.570	15	3:57.255	16
Trinity Ellis	Women's singles	59.219	16	59.053	11	58.888	13	59.704	17	3:56.864	14
Makena Hodgson	Women's singles	59.505	19	59.477	18	59.286	22	59.568	13	3:57.536	17

Mixed relay

Athlete	Event	Run 1		Run 2		Run 3			Total
Athlete	Event	Time	Rank	Time	Rank	Time	Rank	Time	Rank
Trinity Ellis; Reid Watts; Tristan Walker; Justin Snith	Team relay	1:00.880	7	1:00.210	7	1:00.110	3	3:05.235	6

== Short track speed skating ==
Canada qualified all three relays and a maximum of five athletes in each gender. The team was officially named on January 18, 2022. Three skaters (Hamelin, Dion, and Boutin) were the only athletes with Olympic experience before the games.

Men

Athlete	Event	Heat		Quarterfinal		Semifinal		Final	
Athlete	Event	Time	Rank	Time	Rank	Time	Rank	Time	Rank
Steven Dubois	500 m	40.399	1 Q	40.494	2 Q	40.825	4 ADV A	40.669	3rd place, bronze medalist(s)
Maxime Laoun	500 m	DNF		Did not advance					28
Jordan Pierre-Gilles	500 m	40.488	2 Q	DNF		Did not advance			18
Pascal Dion	1000 m	1:24.711	2 Q	DNF		Did not advance			12
Jordan Pierre-Gilles	1000 m	1:24.067	2 Q	DSQ		Did not advance			16
Pascal Dion	1500 m	—N/a		2:09.723	2 Q	2:15.271	7	Did not advance	18
Steven Dubois	1500 m	—N/a		2:15.123	3 Q	2:38.000	6 ADV A	2:09.254	2nd place, silver medalist(s)
Charles Hamelin	1500 m	—N/a		2:11.239	1 Q	DSQ		Did not advance	19
Pascal Dion; Steven Dubois; Jordan Pierre-Gilles; Charles Hamelin; Maxime Laoun*	5000 m relay	—N/a				6:38.752	1 FA	6:41.257	1st place, gold medalist(s)

Qualification legend: Q - Qualify based on position in heat; q - Qualify based on time in field; FA - Qualify to medal final; ADV A - Advanced to medal final on referee decision; FB - Qualify to consolation final
* - Athlete skated in a preliminary round but not the final.

Women

Athlete	Event	Heat		Quarterfinal		Semifinal		Final	
Athlete	Event	Time	Rank	Time	Rank	Time	Rank	Time	Rank
Kim Boutin	500 m	42.732	1 Q	42.39	1 Q	42.664	2 FA	42.724	3rd place, bronze medalist(s)
Florence Brunelle	500 m	43.477	2 Q	DSQ		Did not advance			19
Alyson Charles	500 m	42.991	2 Q	1:07.206	4 ADV	42.829	4 FB	43.273	8
Kim Boutin	1000 m	DNF		Did not advance					29
Alyson Charles	1000 m	1:29.87	3 ADV	1:30.161	5	Did not advance			20
Courtney Sarault	1000 m	1:27.798	1 Q	1:29.450	3	Did not advance			11
Danaé Blais	1500 m	—N/a		No time	4	Did not advance			25
Kim Boutin	1500 m	—N/a		2:17.739	1 Q	2:22.371	3 FB	2:45.568	10
Courtney Sarault	1500 m	—N/a		2:20.365	1 Q	2:18.316	4 FB	2:45.606	11
Kim Boutin; Florence Brunelle; Alyson Charles; Courtney Sarault	3000 m relay	—N/a				4:05.89	1 FA	4:04.329	4

Qualification legend: Q - Qualify based on position in heat; q - Qualify based on time in field; FA - Qualify to medal final; FB - Qualify to consolation final; ADV - Advanced on referee decision

Mixed

Athlete	Event	Quarterfinal		Semifinal		Final	
Athlete	Event	Time	Rank	Time	Rank	Time	Rank
Kim Boutin; Florence Brunelle; Pascal Dion*; Steven Dubois; Jordan Pierre-Gilles; Courtney Sarault*	2000 m relay	2:36.747	2 Q	2:36.808	1 FA	DSQ	6

Qualification legend: Q - Qualify based on position in heat; q - Qualify based on time in field; FA - Qualify to medal final; FB - Qualify to consolation final
* - Athlete skated in a preliminary round but not the final.

== Skeleton ==
Canada qualified three athletes in skeleton (one male and two female). The team was officially named on January 20, 2022.

Athlete	Event	Run 1		Run 2		Run 3		Run 4		Total	
Athlete	Event	Time	Rank	Time	Rank	Time	Rank	Time	Rank	Time	Rank
Blake Enzie	Men's	1:01.65	19	1:01.76	20	1:01.93	21	1:01.54	19	4:06.88	20
Jane Channell	Women's	1:02.59	13	1:03.31	22	1:02.71	19	1:02.34	10	4:10.95	17
Mirela Rahneva	Women's	1:02.03	1	1:03.14	18	1:01.72	2	1:02.26	6	4:09.15	5

== Ski jumping ==
Canada qualified four ski jumpers, two males and two females. The Canadian team was named on January 21, 2022. On February 7, Canada won the bronze medal in the mixed team competition, the first-ever ski jumping medal for the country at the Winter Olympics.

Athlete	Event	Qualification			First round			Final			Total	
Athlete	Event	Distance	Points	Rank	Distance	Points	Rank	Distance	Points	Rank	Points	Rank
Mackenzie Boyd-Clowes	Men's normal hill	94.5	97.1	17 Q	100.5	129.8	12 Q	100.0	122.8	19	252.6	16
Matthew Soukup	Men's normal hill	75.0	52.7	47 Q	92.0	103.0	45	Did not advance				45
Mackenzie Boyd-Clowes	Men's large hill	122.0	115.8	18 Q	128.5	119.2	33	Did not advance				33
Matthew Soukup	Men's large hill	108.5	82.0	47 Q	115.0	90.8	49	Did not advance				49
Alexandria Loutitt	Women's normal hill	—N/a			DSQ			Did not advance				DSQ
Abigail Strate	Women's normal hill	—N/a			75.5	71.7	26 Q	84.5	90.12	12	161.9	23
Alexandria Loutitt; Matthew Soukup; Abigail Strate; Mackenzie Boyd-Clowes	Mixed team normal hill	—N/a			366.0	415.4	4 Q	372.0	429.2	5	844.6	3rd place, bronze medalist(s)

== Snowboarding ==
Canada qualified 23 snowboarders (11 men and 12 women). 19 snowboarders (nine men and 10 women) were named as part of the team on 19 January 2022. After an internal appeal process, four alpine snowboarders were added to the team (Beaulieu, Buck, Hawkrigg, and Lefebvre). Jasey-Jay Anderson, who competed in all six prior editions of the parallel giant slalom event, was not named to the team. Derek Livingston, who was originally named to the team, was replaced by Liam Gill due to an injury sustained in training. On Day 3 (February 7), Max Parrot won the gold medal in the slopestyle event, marking Canada's first gold medal of the Games.

Alpine

Athlete	Event	Qualification		Round of 16	Quarterfinal	Semifinal	Final / BM	
Athlete	Event	Time	Rank	Opposition Result	Opposition Result	Opposition Result	Opposition Result	Rank
Sébastien Beaulieu	Men's giant slalom	1:24.52	27	Did not advance				27
Arnaud Gaudet	Men's giant slalom	1:24.43	26	Did not advance				26
Jules Lefebvre	Men's giant slalom	1:22.94	20	Did not advance				20
Kaylie Buck	Women's giant slalom	1:30.14	21	Did not advance				21
Megan Farrell	Women's giant slalom	1:28.37	10 Q	Ulbing (AUT); L +0.50	Did not advance			12
Jennifer Hawkrigg	Women's giant slalom	DNF		Did not advance				DNF

Freestyle
Men

Athlete	Event	Qualification					Final				
Athlete	Event	Run 1	Run 2	Run 3	Best	Rank	Run 1	Run 2	Run 3	Best	Rank
Mark McMorris	Big air	81.50	65.75	65.75	147.25	8 Q	80.50	21.00	33.25	113.75	10
Max Parrot	Big air	78.25	86.50	26.50	164.75	1 Q	28.25	94.00	76.25	170.25	3rd place, bronze medalist(s)
Darcy Sharpe	Big air	29.00	77.50	64.50	142.00	12 Q	20.00	82.00	5.75	87.75	12
Sébastien Toutant	Big air	67.00	22.50	11.25	89.50	26	Did not advance				26
Liam Gill	Halfpipe	16.75	15.50	—N/a	16.75	23	Did not advance				23
Mark McMorris	Slopestyle	62.70	83.30	—N/a	83.30	2 Q	76.98	80.85	88.53	88.53	3rd place, bronze medalist(s)
Max Parrot	Slopestyle	70.11	36.68	—N/a	70.11	10 Q	79.86	90.96	36.56	90.96	1st place, gold medalist(s)
Darcy Sharpe	Slopestyle	45.46	25.15	—N/a	45.46	23	Did not advance				23
Sébastien Toutant	Slopestyle	23.68	71.06	—N/a	71.06	8 Q	52.63	30.40	54.00	54.00	9

Women

Athlete	Event	Qualification					Final				
Athlete	Event	Run 1	Run 2	Run 3	Best	Rank	Run 1	Run 2	Run 3	Best	Rank
Jasmine Baird	Big air	69.00	60.50	69.00	129.50	10 Q	68.75	48.75	61.25	130.00	7
Laurie Blouin	Big air	68.00	67.25	88.25	156.25	4 Q	13.50	86.25	28.75	115.00	8
Brooke Voigt	Big air	65.00	31.00	17.50	96.00	21	Did not advance				21
Brooke D'Hondt	Halfpipe	69.25	70.00	—N/a	70.00	10 Q	66.75	11.00	9.00	66.75	10
Elizabeth Hosking	Halfpipe	10.00	70.53	—N/a	70.53	9 Q	73.00	79.25	5.00	79.25	6
Jasmine Baird	Slopestyle	49.50	14.41	—N/a	49.50	16	Did not advance				16
Laurie Blouin	Slopestyle	66.85	71.55	—N/a	71.55	7 Q	77.96	46.70	81.42	81.42	4
Brooke Voigt	Slopestyle	37.11	12.78	—N/a	37.11	22	Did not advance				22

Snowboard cross

Athlete	Event	Seeding		1/8 final	Quarterfinal	Semifinal	Final	
Athlete	Event	Time	Rank	Position	Position	Position	Position	Rank
Éliot Grondin	Men's snowboard cross	1:16.29	1	1 Q	1 Q	1 FA	2	2nd place, silver medalist(s)
Kevin Hill	Men's snowboard cross	1:19.45	26	4	Did not advance			27
Liam Moffatt	Men's snowboard cross	1:18.45	13	3	Did not advance			19
Zoe Bergermann	Women's snowboard cross	1:25.84	24	2 Q	4	Did not advance		15
Tess Critchlow	Women's snowboard cross	1:26.13	26	2 Q	1 Q	3 FB	2	6
Audrey McManiman	Women's snowboard cross	1:24.98	13	2 Q	3	Did not advance		11
Meryeta O'Dine	Women's snowboard cross	1:23.01	3	1 Q	1 Q	1 FA	3	3rd place, bronze medalist(s)

Mixed

Athlete	Event	Quarterfinal	Semifinal	Final	
Athlete	Event	Position	Position	Position	Rank
Tess Critchlow; Liam Moffatt	Team snowboard cross	3	Did not advance		=9
Éliot Grondin; Meryeta O'Dine	Team snowboard cross	2 Q	2 FA	3	3rd place, bronze medalist(s)

Qualification legend: Q - Qualify to next round; FA - Qualify to medal final; FB - Qualify to consolation final

== Speed skating ==
Canada qualified 16 athletes (eight per gender) through the 2021–22 ISU Speed Skating World Cup. Canada's team was officially announced on January 17, 2022.

Isabelle Weidemann won Canada's first medal of the games, a bronze, in the Women's 3000 metres event. On February 9, Ivanie Blondin withdrew from the 5000 metres event to focus on the team pursuit event.

Distance
Men

Athlete	Event	Race	
Athlete	Event	Time	Rank
Laurent Dubreuil	500 m	34.522	4
Antoine Gélinas-Beaulieu	500 m	35.840	29
Gilmore Junio	500 m	35.162	21
Laurent Dubreuil	1000 m	1:08.32	2nd place, silver medalist(s)
Antoine Gélinas-Beaulieu	1000 m	1:10.075	22
Connor Howe	1000 m	1:08.97	12
Antoine Gélinas-Beaulieu	1500 m	1:48.00	23
Connor Howe	1500 m	1:44.86	5
Tyson Langelaar	1500 m	1:47.81	22
Ted-Jan Bloemen	5000 m	6:19.11	10
Ted-Jan Bloemen	10000 m	13:01.39	8
Graeme Fish	10000 m	12:58.80	6

Women

Athlete	Event	Race	
Athlete	Event	Time	Rank
Marsha Hudey	500 m	38.79	21
Brooklyn McDougall	500 m	38.84	22
Heather McLean	500 m	39.31	27
Maddison Pearman	1000 m	1:17.66	26
Alexa Scott	1000 m	1:15.79	12
Ivanie Blondin	1500 m	1:56.49	13
Maddison Pearman	1500 m	1:59.89	24
Ivanie Blondin	3000 m	4:06.40	14
Valérie Maltais	3000 m	4:04.27	12
Isabelle Weidemann	3000 m	3:58.64	3rd place, bronze medalist(s)
Isabelle Weidemann	5000 m	6:48.18	2nd place, silver medalist(s)

Mass start

Athlete	Event	Semifinal			Final		
Athlete	Event	Points	Time	Rank	Points	Time	Rank
Jordan Belchos	Men's mass start	8	7:46.05	5 Q	0	7:48.14	13
Antoine Gélinas-Beaulieu	Men's mass start	3	7:56.93	6 Q	0	8:13.35	15
Ivanie Blondin	Women's mass start	65	8:28.68	1 Q	40	8:14.79	2nd place, silver medalist(s)
Valérie Maltais	Women's mass start	3	8:35.47	7 Q	6	8:20.46	6

Team pursuit

Athlete	Event	Ranking round		Semifinal	Final	
Athlete	Event	Time	Rank	Opposition Time	Opposition Time	Rank
Jordan Belchos; Ted-Jan Bloemen; Connor Howe; Tyson Langelaar	Men's team pursuit	3:40.17	5 FC	Did not advance	South Korea; W 3:40.39	5
Ivanie Blondin; Valérie Maltais; Isabelle Weidemann	Women's team pursuit	2:53.99	2 Q	Netherlands; W 2:54.96 FA	Japan; W 2:53.43 OR	1st place, gold medalist(s)

Qualification legend: Q - Qualify to the next round; FA - Qualify to the gold medal final; FB - Qualify to the bronze medal final; FC - Qualify to the 5th place final; FD - Qualify to the 7th place final

== See also ==
- Canada at the 2022 Winter Paralympics
- Canada at the 2022 Commonwealth Games
