= Lewis Irving =

Canadian freestyle skier (born 1995)

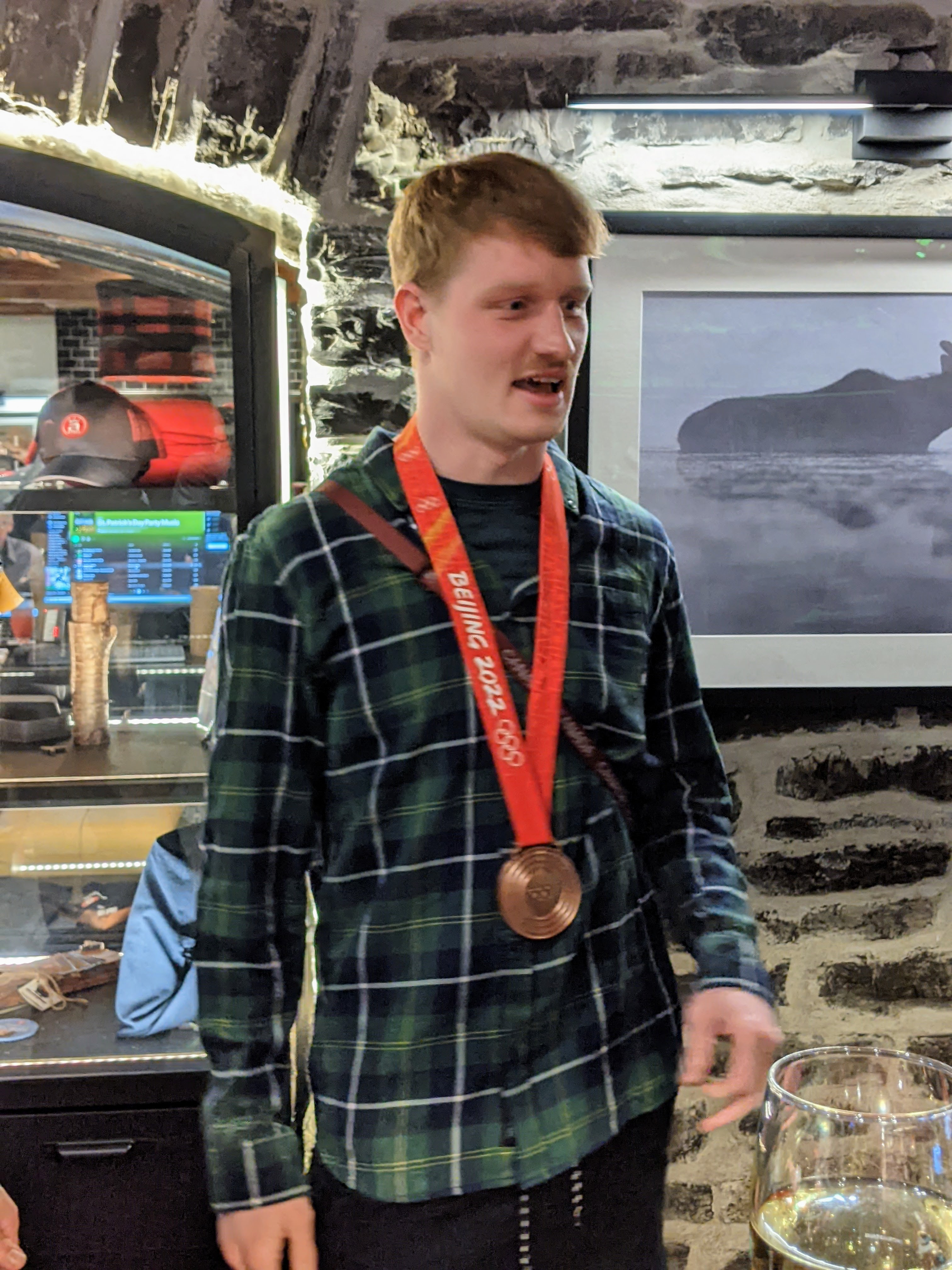
- Irving in 2022

Personal information
- Born: 10 November 1995 (age 30) Quebec City, Quebec
- Height: 185 cm (6 ft 1 in)

Sport
- Country: Canada
- Sport: Freestyle skiing
- Event: Aerials
Medal record
Men's freestyle skiing
Representing Canada
Olympic Games
| Bronze medal – third place | 2022 Beijing | Mixed team aerials |

Lewis Irving (born 10 November 1995) is a Canadian freestyle skier who competes internationally in the aerials discipline.

== Career ==
He represented Canada at the 2018 Winter Olympics.

On January 24, 2022, Lewis was named to Canada's 2022 Olympic team. At the games, Irving was a part of Canada's bronze medal winning mixed aerials team.
