= Chris Patrician =

Canadian bobsledder

Personal information
- Born: 9 July 1991 (age 35) Scarborough, Ontario, Canada
- Height: 5 ft 11 in (180 cm)

Sport
- Country: Canada
- Sport: Bobsleigh
- Events: Two-man, Four-man

Chris Patrician (born 9 July 1991) is a Canadian bobsledder who competes in the two-man, and four-man events as Breakman and Rightside.

== Career ==
Patrician was recruited to compete in the sport of bobsleigh after finishing his football career at Queens University.

In January 2022, Patrician was named to Canada's 2022 Olympic team.
