= Emily Dickson =

Canadian biathlete

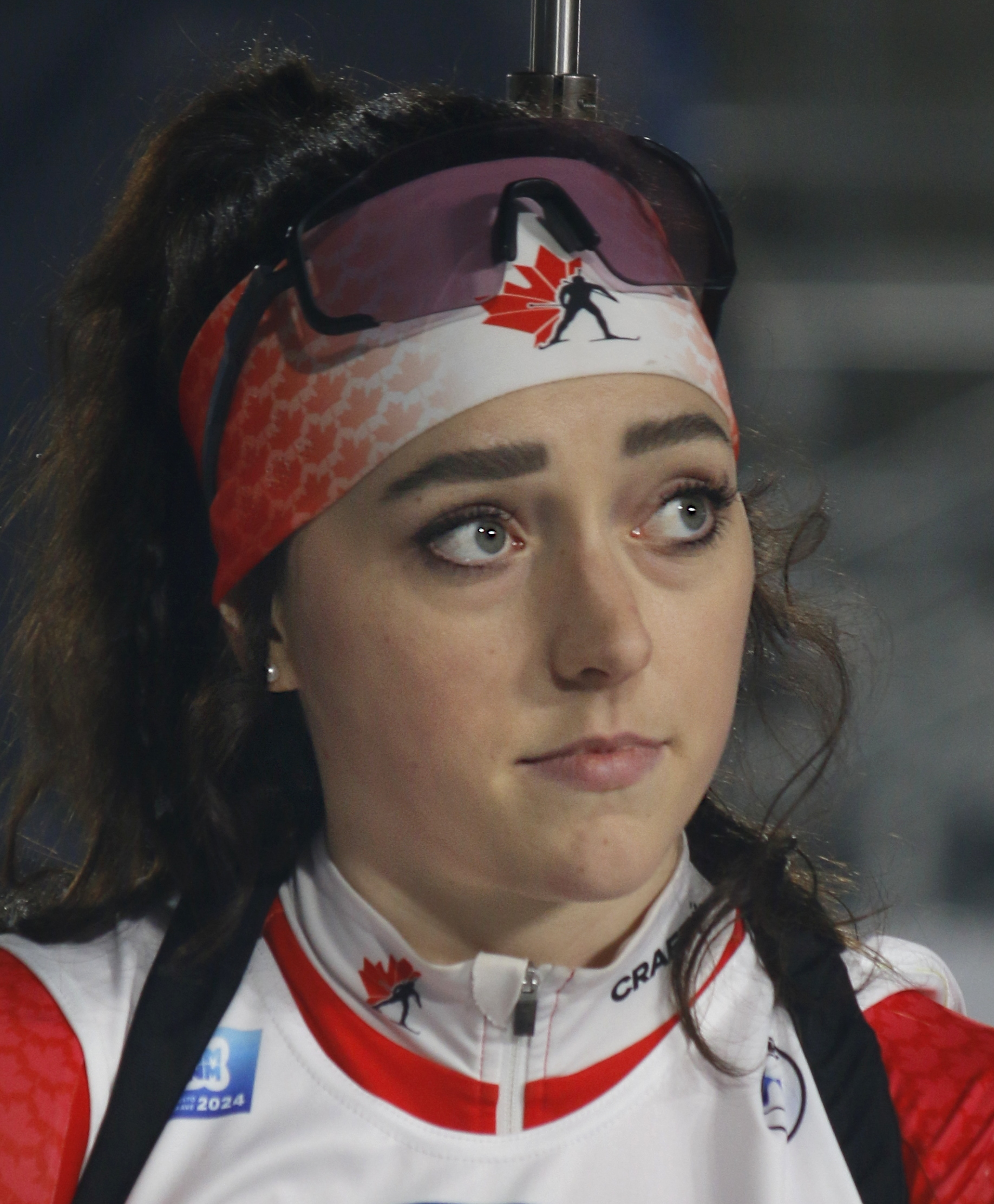
- Dickson in 2024

Personal information
- Born: May 23, 1997 (age 29) Burns Lake, British Columbia, Canada

Sport
- Country: Canada
- Sport: Biathlon

Emily Dickson (born May 23, 1997) is a Canadian biathlete from Burns Lake, British Columbia.

== Career ==
=== Junior ===
Dickson made her debut as part of Canada's team at the Biathlon World Youth Championships in 2013. At the 2015 Canada Winter Games, Dickson won three medals in the biathlon events, one of each colour.

=== Senior ===
Dickson started the 2021–22 season by competing on the IBU Cup tour. In January 2022, Dickson was called up to the 2021–22 Biathlon World Cup team, finishing 60th in the sprint event.

In January 2022, Dickson was named to Canada's 2022 Olympic team.

== Career results ==
=== Olympic Games ===
0 medals

Event	Individual	Sprint	Pursuit	Mass start	Relay	Mixed relay
(China) 2022 Beijing	70th	81st	—	—	10th	—

=== World Championships ===
0 medals

Event	Individual	Sprint	Pursuit	Mass start	Relay	Mixed relay	Single mixed relay
(Italy) 2020 Antholz	—	56th	54th	—	9th	14th	—
(Germany) 2023 Oberhof	—	—	—	—	11th	—	—
(Czech Republic) 2024 Nové Město na Moravě	57th	57th	52nd	—	12th	—	—
