= Olivia Bouffard-Nesbitt =

Canadian cross-country skier (born 1992)

Personal information
- Nationality: Canada
- Born: 30 August 1992 (age 34) Morin-Heights, Quebec, Canada
- Height: 5 ft 8 in (173 cm)

Sport
- Sport: Skiing
- Club: Fondeurs-Laurentides

World Cup career
- Seasons: 4 – (2015–2016, 2022–present)
- Indiv. starts: 23
- Indiv. podiums: 0
- Team starts: 1
- Team podiums: 0
- Overall titles: 0 – (86th in 2023)
- Discipline titles: 0
- Updated on 27 March 2023

Olivia Bouffard-Nesbitt (born 30 August 1992) is a Canadian cross-country skier. She competed at the 2022 Winter Olympics, in Women's 10 kilometre classical, Women's 15 kilometre skiathlon, Women's sprint, and Women's 4 × 5 kilometre relay.

== Career ==
=== Junior ===
Bouffard-Nesbitt began her junior career as part of the FIS World U23 Championships team in 2015, with a best placement of 12th in the 15 km skiathlon event.

=== Senior ===
On 21 January 2022, Bouffard-Nesbitt was officially named to Canada's 2022 Olympic team after the FIS awarded Canada a reallocated quota spot.

== Cross-country skiing results ==
All results are sourced from the International Ski Federation (FIS).

=== Olympic Games ===
Year	Age	10 km individual	15 km skiathlon	30 km mass start	Sprint	4 × 5 km relay	Team sprint
2022	29	61	44	—	40	9	—

=== World Championships ===
Year	Age	10 km individual	15 km skiathlon	30 km mass start	Sprint	4 × 5 km relay	Team sprint
2015	22	52	—	—	—	—	—
2023	30	—	40	—	38	8	—

=== World Cup ===
==== Season standings ====
Season	Age	Discipline standings				Ski Tour standings		
Season	Age	Overall	Distance	Sprint	U23	Nordic Opening	Tour de Ski	Ski Tour Canada
2015	22	NC	NC	NC	NC	—	—	—N/a
2016	23	NC	NC	NC	—N/a	—	—	44
2022	29	NC	NC	NC	—N/a	—N/a	—	—N/a
2023	30	86	75	65	—N/a	—N/a	—	—N/a
