= Blake Enzie =

Canadian skeleton racer

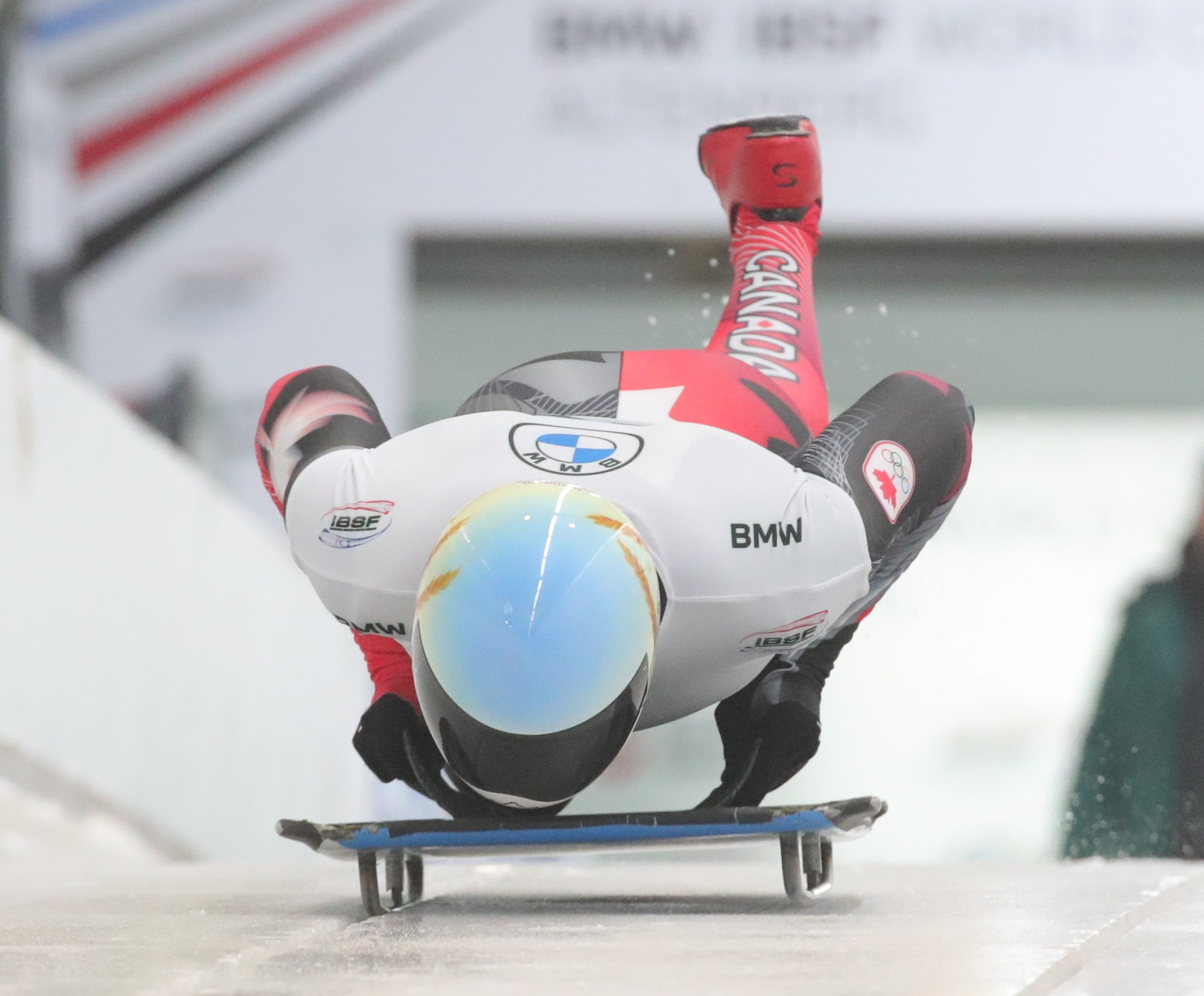

Personal information
- Born: September 2, 2001 (age 24) Calgary, Alberta, Canada

Sport
- Country: Canada
- Sport: Skeleton

Achievements and titles
- Olympic finals: 20th (Beijing 2022)

Blake Enzie (born September 2, 2001) is a Canadian skeleton racer who has competed since 2019.

== Career ==
=== Junior ===
Enzie represented Canada had two IBSF Junior World Championships in 2019 and 2020, finishing as the highest-ranked slider from North America in both events.

=== Senior ===
During the 2019–20 season, Enzie competed on the intercontinental circuit and had his highest finish of 15th. Enzie would make his World Cup debut at the end of December 2021, with his best placing a 19th place in St. Moritz in January 2022.

In January 2022, Enzie was named to Canada's 2022 Olympic team.
