= Daniel Sunderland =

Canadian bobsledder

Personal information
- Born: 16 February 1989 (age 37) Fort McMurray, Alberta, Canada
- Height: 187 cm (6 ft 2 in)

Sport
- Country: Canada
- Sport: Bobsleigh
- Events: Two-man, Four-man

Daniel Sunderland (born 16 February 1989) is a Canadian bobsledder who competes in the two-man and four-man events as a driver.

== Career ==
In January 2022, Sunderland was named to Canada's 2022 Olympic team.
