= Allie (musician) =

Canadian musician

Allison Ho-Sang, who records and performs as a l l i e, is a Canadian rhythm and blues singer and songwriter from Toronto, Ontario.

The daughter of Winston Ho-Sang of the reggae band Fujahtive, she first became known for the 2014 song "Private Island", a collaboration with producer 2nd Son which was a shortlisted finalist for the 2015 SOCAN Songwriting Prize.

She released her debut EP Moonlust in 2015, and followed up with the full-length album Nightshade in 2017. Nightshade was longlisted for the 2018 Polaris Music Prize.

Her second full-length album, Tabula Rasa, was released in 2021. The album was a Juno Award nominee for Contemporary R&B/Soul Recording of the Year at the Juno Awards of 2022.
