= Fujahtive =

- Origin: Toronto, Ontario, Canada
- Genres: Reggae
- Years active: 1986–present
- Members: Winston Ho-Sang; Anthony Goldstein; Andrew Cosby; David Jackson; Craig Naughty; Anthony Annecchini; Ira Zingraff; Rob Jagodkin
- Past members: Wayne Ho-Sang; Jack Cavacece; Asher Schachter; Andrew Kazdan; Lionel Newman; Pat Carey; Howard Rev Moore
- Website: www.fujahtive.com

Fujahtive is an eight piece reggae band based in Toronto, Ontario, Canada. The band was known for their powerful, horn section-driven brand of reggae during their live performances in Toronto and tours across Canada throughout the late 1980s and 1990s. Fujahtive's second album, The Sound, received a nomination for Best Reggae Recording at the 1995 Juno Awards.

The band's "Send fi mi girl" video was one of the first Canadian reggae videos to crack the Much Music regular rotation in 1991. That same year they were invited to guest host and play live on the MuchMusic show Xtendamix along with regular host Master T. The band took a break in 2006 before regrouping on November 7, 2014 for a sold out benefit concert in Toronto.

== History ==
Fujahtive was originally formed in 1986, when all the original members were still in high school. Jamaican-born lead vocalist Winston Ho-Sang transferred from Oakwood Collegiate to Forest Hill Collegiate, where he met Anthony Goldstein. They bonded over their mutual love of reggae music and decided to put a band together with members from each schools' music programs. Winston Ho-Sang's identical twin brother Wayne Ho-Sang also joined the band. The band has backed up Michael Rose of Black Uhuru and has been the opening act for Yellowman, Burning Spear, Gregory Isaacs, Sly & Robbie, Culture, Linton Kwesi Johnson, Marcia Griffiths, Eek-a-mouse, Shinehead and most recently Luciano (2016).

Wayne and Winston Ho-Sang are the father and uncle, respectively, of professional ice hockey player Josh Ho-Sang. Winston's daughter Allison is an R&B singer-songwriter who records and performs as a l l i e.

== Members ==
=== Current line-up ===
- Winston Ho-Sang – vocalist (1986–present)
- Anthony Goldstein – guitarist (1986–present)
- Andrew Cosby – trombone (1986–present)
- David Jackson – keyboardist/vocalist (1987–present)
- Craig Naughty – bassist (1988–present)
- Anthony Annecchini – drummer (1993–present)
- Rob Jagodkin – saxophone (1986–present)
- Ira Zingraff – trumpet (1986–present)
- Jeff Luge Holdip - sound engineer (1989–present)

=== Past members ===
- Jack Cavacece - drummer (1987–1993)
- Wayne Ho-Sang - vocal (1986–1988)
- Asher Schachter - bass (1986–1988)
- Andrew Kazdan - keyboards(1986)
- Lionel Newman - drums (1986)
- Pat Carey - saxophone
- Howard "Rev" Moore - trumpet

== Discography ==
=== Albums ===
- In Black & White (1987)
- The Sound (1995)

== Awards ==
- 1988 Canadian Reggae Music Award – Best Reggae Album

=== Nominations ===
- 1991 Casby nomination – Best Reggae Recording for Black & White
- 1991 Canadian Reggae Music Awards nominations – Best Reggae Album for In Black & White
- 1995 Juno award nomination – Best Reggae Recording for The Sound
