= Josh Ho-Sang =

Canadian ice hockey player and rapper (born 1996)

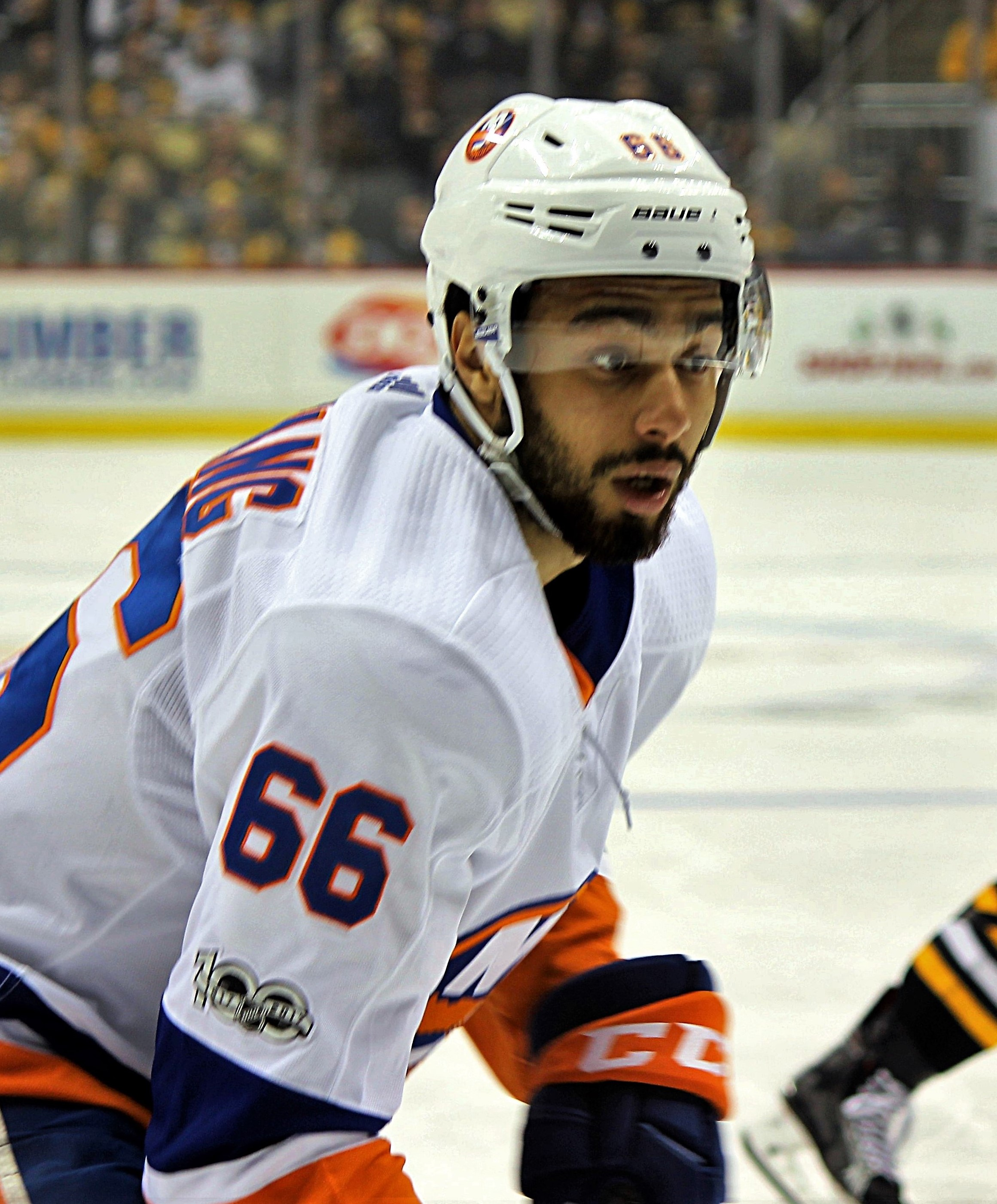
- Ho-Sang with the New York Islanders in 2017
- Born: January 22, 1996 (age 30) Toronto, Ontario, Canada
- Height: 5 ft 11 in (180 cm)
- Weight: 190 lb (86 kg; 13 st 8 lb)
- Position: Right wing
- Shoots: Right
- team Former teams: Free agent New York Islanders; Toronto Marlies; Örebro HK; Linköping HC; Salavat Yulaev Ufa; Florida Everblades
- National team: Canada
- NHL draft: 28th overall, 2014; New York Islanders
- Playing career: 2016–present

Joshua Navarro Ho-Sang (born January 22, 1996) is a Canadian rapper and professional ice hockey forward who is currently an unrestricted free agent. He was selected by the New York Islanders in the first round, 28th overall, in the 2014 NHL entry draft.

The Toronto Sun described him in June 2014 as a "singular hockey player of immense talent, caught on an island of discourse." He said of himself: "I'm more emotional than most people. That poses a problem for the hockey world. A lot of players are trained to hold their emotions... I love to dangle. I love to play an offensive game. I love to celebrate when I score."

== Early and personal life ==
Ho-Sang was born in Toronto, Ontario, to a Jamaican father of Chinese and African descent and a Chilean mother of Russian-Jewish and Swedish heritage. He grew up in the Thornhill neighbourhood of the Regional Municipality of York, in the Toronto suburbs. He said he has "always celebrated the Jewish holidays like Chanukah and the High Holidays with family and friends," as well as Christmas and Easter. When he was 17 years old, Toronto Sun writer Steve Simmons predicted that he "might be better than all" the previous Jewish ice hockey players (which included the then-current Jewish NHL players centre Michael Cammalleri, right winger Mike Brown, left winger Eric Nystrom, and centre Jeff Halpern).

His father, Wayne, is a black Jamaican professional tennis player from Kingston, Jamaica, whose grandfather is Chinese from Hong Kong; he was also a member of the reggae band Fujahtive. His business analyst mother, Ericka, is Jewish and was born in Santiago, Chile, to Russian and Swedish parents. His father immigrated to Canada from Jamaica at the age of 10, and his mother immigrated to Canada from Chile at the age of 12.

His brother Khole is five years his junior. At age 13 in November 2014, Khole was a member of Team Ontario in American football and was slated to play for Canada in the 2015 Snooper Bowl, an international Pop Warner Football competition. As a first degree black belt in taekwondo, he finished second in his category at Nationals in 2014, and was named to Team Ontario and the Canadian national team.

== Playing career ==
He was selected by the Windsor Spitfires in the first round (5th overall) during the 2012 Ontario Hockey League (OHL) Priority Selection. He was rated a top prospect.

In his first season with the Spitfires, Ho-Sang recorded 44 points in 63 games, finishing sixth among OHL rookies. In December 2012, he played for Team Ontario at the World U-17 Hockey Challenge. In five games, he had three goals and two assists.

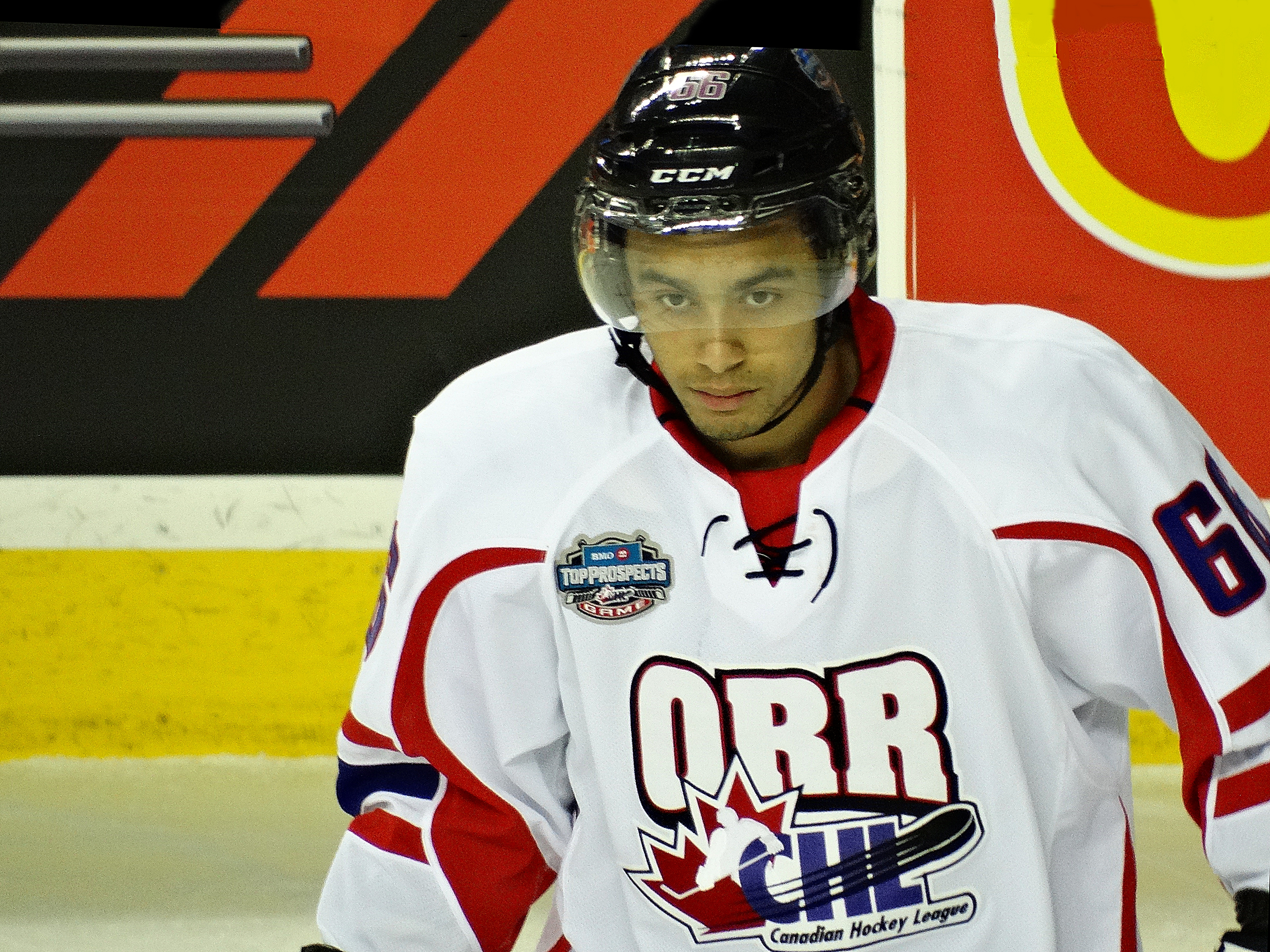
Ho-Sang at 2014 CHL/NHL Top Prospects Game

Ho-Sang skated in the 2014 BMO Top Prospects Game, recording one goal and one assist. On April 5, Ho-Sang received a 15-game suspension (later reduced to six games) for the start of the next season for an illegal hit-from-behind to London Knights' defenceman Zach Bell on March 27. The hit resulted in Bell suffering a broken leg.

Ho-Sang was selected by the New York Islanders in the first round (28th overall) in the 2014 NHL entry draft. Islanders' general manager Garth Snow indicated he was not worried about Ho-Sang fitting in, saying, "He'll fit right in. They shit on me too." Snow also stated "We get the players that we feel can help us win. [And] we don’t give a shit what anyone else thinks." In October 2014, the Islanders signed Ho-Sang to a three-year, entry-level contract.

Ho-Sang was returned to the Spitfires for the 2014–15 season. On November 14, he was traded to the Niagara IceDogs in exchange for Hayden McCool and second-round picks in 2016, 2018 and 2019. He finished the season with 81 points in 60 games.

Ho-Sang was returned to the IceDogs as punishment for being late to the first day of the Islanders' 2015 training camp. In his final season with the IceDogs, Ho-Sang led the team in scoring with 82 points in 66 games. He also recorded 26 points in 17 postseason games; the team lost in four games to the London Knights during the OHL Finals.

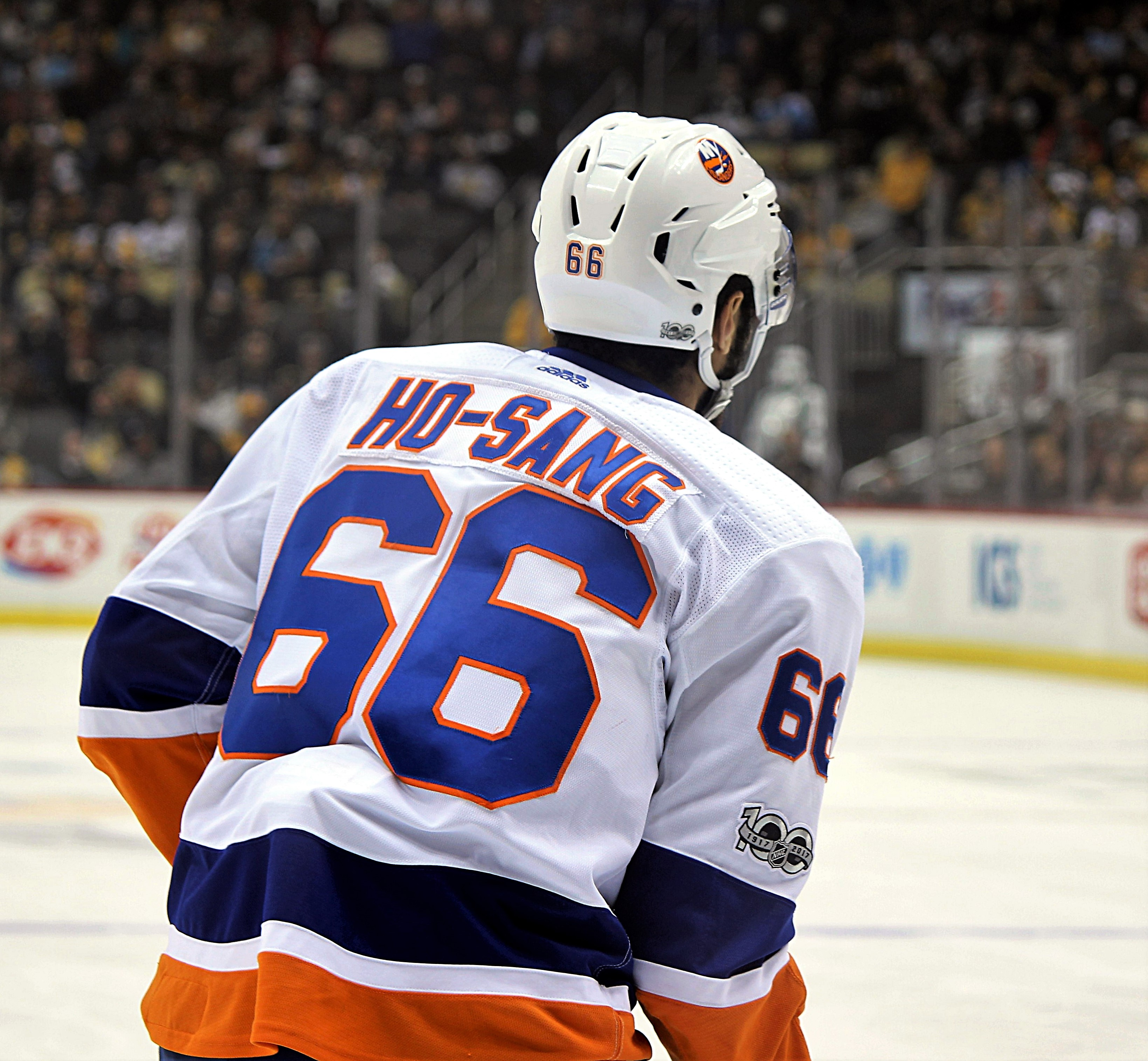
Ho-Sang wore #66 in honor of Mario Lemieux

Ho-Sang began the 2016–17 season with the Islanders' American Hockey League (AHL) affiliate, the Bridgeport Sound Tigers. On February 28, 2017, he was called up by the Islanders on emergency conditions but was returned to Bridgeport just a few hours later. Ho-Sang was recalled the following day and made his NHL debut with the Islanders on March 2, 2017, against the Dallas Stars. On March 7, in his fourth NHL game, Ho-Sang scored his first NHL goal, a first-period power play goal against the Edmonton Oilers.

Ho-Sang started the 2017–18 season with the Islanders. On October 25, he was assigned to the Sound Tigers after recording four assists in six games. He was recalled on an emergency basis on November 11, 2017. The emergency basis was terminated and changed to a regular recall on November 16. It was short-lived, however, as he was sent back down to the Bridgeport Sound Tigers on December 16, 2017, after recording eight points in 15 games.

After being named the Sound Tigers' Player of the Week on February 17, 2019, Ho-Sang and Michael Dal Colle were recalled to the Islanders on March 5. He was returned to the Sound Tigers on March 8 after sitting as a healthy scratch for two games.

On August 19, 2019, the Islanders re-signed Ho-Sang to a one-year contract extension. However, on September 30 Ho-Sang was placed on waivers by the Islanders. Ho-Sang cleared waivers on October 1, and was assigned to the Bridgeport Sound Tigers to start the 2019-2020 American Hockey League season.

On October 3, 2019, it was reported by Islanders general manager Lou Lamoriello that Ho-Sang had requested a trade through his agent. Ho-Sang, despite clearing waivers and being assigned to the Bridgeport Sound Tigers, was asked not to report to or play. Ho-Sang missed the first 10 weeks of the 2019–20 season, as Lamoriello attempted to meet his trade request.

Unable to facilitate a trade, Ho-Sang returned to the Islanders organization when he was assigned to the Sound Tigers on December 17, 2019. In 16 games with Bridgeport, Ho-Sang posted 3 goals and 10 points before the Islanders reassigned him to join the San Antonio Rampage of the AHL affiliate to the St. Louis Blues, for the remainder of the season on February 28, 2020.

As a restricted free agent, Ho-Sang was signed by New York to a one-year contract extension on October 28, 2020. Remaining with the Islanders through the off-season leading into the pandemic-delayed 2020–21 season, Ho-Sang attended training camp before he was reassigned by the Islanders on loan to Swedish top-tier club, Örebro HK of the Swedish Hockey League (SHL), for the remainder of the season on January 16, 2021. Ho-Sang made just 5 appearances with Örebro, collecting 1 assist, before he was released by the club citing a lack of match fitness on February 10, 2021. Ho-Sang remained in Sweden, agreeing to a loan contract with Linköping HC for the remainder of the season on February 14. On July 28, 2021, Ho-Sang was invited to the Toronto Maple Leafs' 2021–22 training camp on a professional tryout contract (PTO). On October 5, 2021, Ho-Sang signed a standard player contract with the Toronto Marlies of the AHL and was subsequently released by the Leafs from the PTO.

On July 13, 2022, Ho-Sang signed a one-year contract with Russian club Salavat Yulaev Ufa of the Kontinental Hockey League (KHL) for the 2022–23 season.

On March 13, 2024, Ho-Sang signed a contract with the Florida Everblades of the ECHL for the 2023–2024 season. He won the Kelly Cup by the end of the season, with his 17 assists leading all players in the 2024 Kelly Cup playoffs.

On March 27, 2025, Ho-Sang re-signed with the Everblades, changing his number from 44 to 55 due to defensemen Kurtis Henry's use of the number prior to Ho-Sang's re-signing with the Everblades.

On December 29, 2025, Ho-Sang signed a two-way contract with Salavat Yulaev Ufa of the KHL. However, he was released in February 2026 without appearing in a game.

=== Jersey number ===
Ho-Sang chose to wear sweater #66 for the Islanders as an homage to Mario Lemieux, who, in response to the controversy generated by the choice, said he had no problem with Ho-Sang wearing the number. Ho-Sang defended his choice, arguing that he did not merely pay homage to Lemieux's on-ice prowess but also his contributions to the community of Pittsburgh. "He fought and continues to fight for other people," Ho-Sang said. "He thinks outside himself. For me, that's a man worth looking up to. That's why I wear the number. That's the type of guy who's behind that number, and that's what's so inspiring for me." He is the second player, after Calgary Flames defenceman T. J. Brodie, to wear the number after Lemieux in a regular season game. At the start of the 2018–19 NHL pre-season, Ho-Sang was asked by general manager Lou Lamoriello to change his Islanders jersey number, as Lamoriello has long stood by a policy which generally forbids players from wearing any number higher than 35. Ho-Sang chose to wear #26 instead.

== International play ==
In January 2022, Ho-Sang was selected to play for Team Canada at the 2022 Winter Olympics.

== Career statistics ==
=== Regular season and playoffs ===
			Regular season					Playoffs
Season	Team	League	GP	G	A	Pts	PIM	GP	G	A	Pts	PIM
2012–13	Windsor Spitfires	OHL	63	14	30	44	22	—	—	—	—	—
2013–14	Windsor Spitfires	OHL	67	32	53	85	44	4	1	2	3	10
2014–15	Windsor Spitfires	OHL	11	3	16	19	8	—	—	—	—	—
2014–15	Niagara IceDogs	OHL	49	14	48	62	38	11	1	15	16	18
2015–16	Niagara IceDogs	OHL	66	19	63	82	44	17	6	20	26	8
2016–17	Bridgeport Sound Tigers	AHL	50	10	26	36	24	—	—	—	—	—
2016–17	New York Islanders	NHL	21	4	6	10	12	—	—	—	—	—
2017–18	New York Islanders	NHL	22	2	10	12	2	—	—	—	—	—
2017–18	Bridgeport Sound Tigers	AHL	50	8	23	31	40	—	—	—	—	—
2018–19	Bridgeport Sound Tigers	AHL	56	8	35	43	18	5	1	1	2	0
2018–19	New York Islanders	NHL	10	1	1	2	6	—	—	—	—	—
2019–20	Bridgeport Sound Tigers	AHL	16	3	7	10	0	—	—	—	—	—
2019–20	San Antonio Rampage	AHL	6	1	2	3	2	—	—	—	—	—
2020–21	Örebro HK	SHL	5	0	1	1	2	—	—	—	—	—
2020–21	Linköping HC	SHL	4	2	0	2	4	—	—	—	—	—
2021–22	Toronto Marlies	AHL	47	16	19	35	24	—	—	—	—	—
2022–23	Salavat Yulaev Ufa	KHL	1	0	1	1	2	4	0	0	0	0
2023–24	Florida Everblades	ECHL	11	2	13	15	6	22	1	17	18	16
2024–25	Florida Everblades	ECHL	6	0	4	4	4	—	—	—	—	—
NHL totals			53	7	17	24	20	—	—	—	—	—
SHL totals			9	2	1	3	6	—	—	—	—	—

=== International ===
Year	Team	Event	Result	GP	G	A	Pts	PIM
2013	Canada Ontario	U17	6th	5	3	2	5	0
2022	Canada	OG	6th	5	0	3	3	2
Junior totals				5	3	2	5	0
Senior totals				5	0	3	3	2

== Rap career ==
Ho-Sang released the album “SAME” on March 5th, 2024. The 18-track album covers mental health issues and the pressure of being a celebrity in the sports world. One of the tracks is titled "Papi For MVP," named after Auston Matthews. On February 26th 2026 Ho-Sang made his return to music when he released the single “kangaroo jack”.

== Awards and honours ==
Honours	Year
CHL/NHL Top Prospects Game	2014
Kelly Cup	2024

== See also ==
- List of select Jewish ice hockey players

Awards and achievements
Preceded by Michael Dal Colle	New York Islanders first round pick 2014	Succeeded by Mathew Barzal
