= Dawn Richardson Wilson =

Canadian bobsledder (born 1999)

Personal information
- Nationality: Canadian
- Born: 26 September 1999 (age 26) Accra, Ghana

Sport
- Country: Canada
- Sport: Bobsleigh

Dawn Richardson Wilson (born 26 September 1999) is a Canadian bobsledder. Richardson Wilson was born in Accra, Ghana; she currently resides in Edmonton, Alberta, Canada. As a bobsledder, Richardson Wilson has been in both the pilot and brakewoman positions. She has been involved in a variety of sports, such as rugby, track and field, and ultimate frisbee, but has gained a recent interest in bobsledding. She made her international debut in 2018, with team member Kori Hol as the pilot, on the North American Cup circuit. A year later, in December 2019, Richardson Wilson got into her first World Cup race, finishing fifth place with Christine de Bruin. She became a fulltime World Cup brakewoman in 2020-21, despite the Canadian team only being able to compete in the second half of the season due to the COVID-19 pandemic.

== Personal life ==
Richardson Wilson emigrated to Canada with her mother when she was two years old. After her mother died four years later, she was taken care of by her brother and sister-in-law.

== Career ==
Richardson Wilson first started the sport in 2018. In December 2019, Richardson Wilson competed in her first World Cup race, finishing in fifth place with Christine de Bruin. Richardson Wilson's best performance was a fourth-place finish in January 2021.

In January 2022, Richardson Wilson was named to Canada's 2022 Olympic team.
