= Sara Villani =

Canadian bobsledder

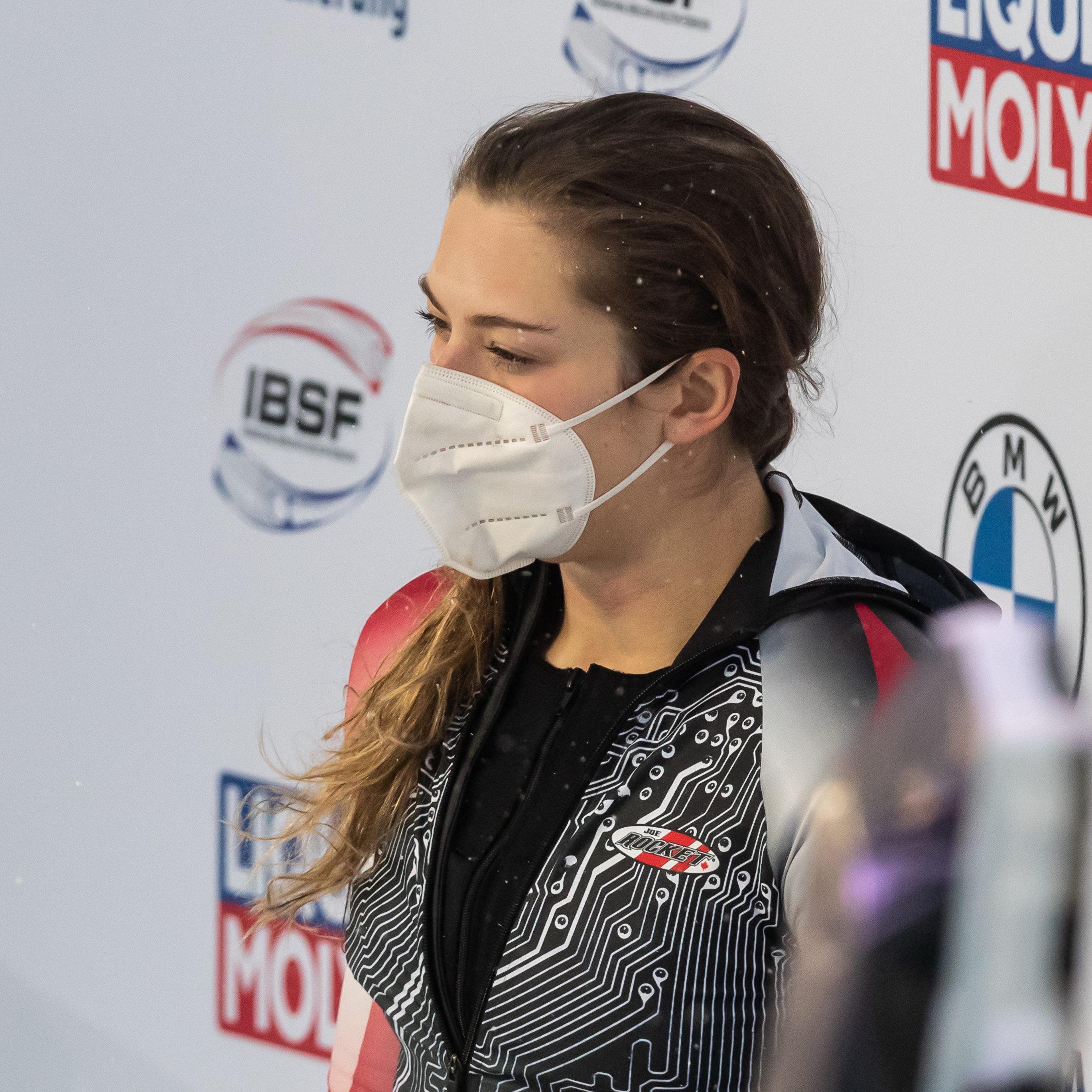
- Villani at the 2021 IBSF World Championships Bobsleigh and Skeleton

Personal information
- Born: 19 September 1996 (age 29) Mississauga, Ontario, Canada
- Home town: Norval, Ontario, Canada

Sport
- Country: Canada
- Sport: Bobsleigh

Sara Villani (born 19 September 1996) is a Canadian bobsledder.

== Career ==
Villani began her athletic career as a heptathlete, but in 2018 she was identified at the TBC Training Ground as a potential brakewoman in bobsleigh. Villani made her IBSF World Cup debut in January 2021, finishing in a career-best fourth with Christine de Bruin. At the IBSF World Championships 2021, Villani finished in 16th place with Christine de Bruin in the two-woman event.

In January 2022, Villani was named to Canada's 2022 Olympic team.
