= Sylvia Hoffman =

American bobsledder (born 1989)

Personal information
- Nickname: Superwoman
- Nationality: American
- Born: June 29, 1989 (age 37) Philadelphia, Pennsylvania, U.S.
- Education: Kilgore College, LSU Shreveport
- Height: 5 ft 8 in (173 cm)
- Weight: 161 lb (73 kg)

Sport
- Country: USA
- Sport: Olympic Weightlifting, Bobsleigh
- Weight class: 69 kg Category
- Events: Monobob, Two-woman
- Turned pro: 2012
Medal record
Olympic Games
Bronze medal – third place	2022 Beijing	Two-woman

Sylvia Hoffman (born June 29, 1989, in Philadelphia) is an American bobsledder who was first discovered and recruited for the national bobsled team on The Next Olympic Hopeful. She is originally from Arlington, TX and attended Louisiana State University Shreveport. Before bobsledding she was a college basketball player and participated in weightlifting.

== Early years ==
During her childhood, Hoffman played many sports, including basketball. She eventually played basketball at the collegiate level for Louisiana State University Shreveport. In 2015, she was invited to attend the training camp for the USA bobsledding team. However, she turned down the offer due to not having enough finances so soon after graduating from college.

Hoffman began training in weightlifting after moving to Colorado Springs, Colorado. During this time, she participated in international competitions for the USA weightlifting team.

== Career ==
=== The Next Olympic Hopeful ===
In 2018, Hoffman competed on the second season of The Next Olympic Hopeful in order to have financial support to train for the Olympics. Hoffman did not win the program but was still noticed by the US Bobsled team and invited to attend the rookie training camp.

=== Bobsledding ===
With little experience in bobsled, Hoffman won both the Rookie Push Championship and the National Push Championship in 2018. She was officially given a spot on the US bobsled team after participating in the national team trials. With the team, she competed in the 2018-2019 World Cup season. At the Innsbruck, Austria competition, she received bronze with partner Elana Meyers Taylor.

In 2020, Hoffman, with partner Kaillie Humphries, won the World Cup at Königssee, Germany.

== See also ==
- Black Women + Bobsledding
