= Nadja Pasternack =

Swiss bobsledder (born 1996)

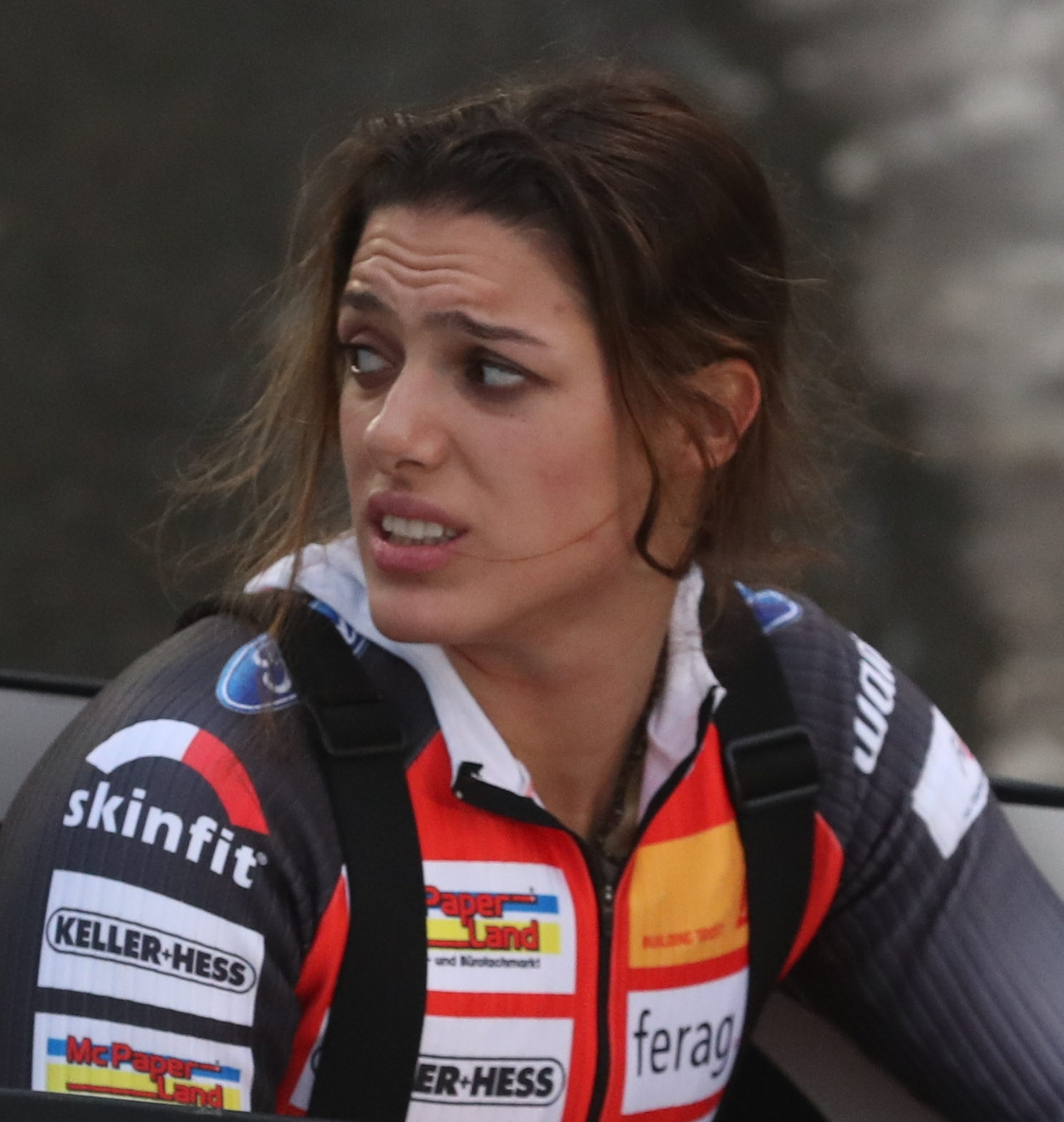
- Pasternack in 2019

Personal information
- Born: 4 July 1996 (age 29) Zurich, Switzerland

Sport
- Country: Switzerland
- Sport: Bobsleigh
- Event: Two-woman
- Coached by: Christoph Langen
Medal record
Women's bobsleigh
Representing Switzerland
European Championships
Gold medal – first place	2026 St. Moritz	Two-woman
Silver medal – second place	2023 Altenberg	Two-woman

Nadja Pasternack (born 4 July 1996) is a Swiss bobsledder. She represented Switzerland at the 2022 Winter Olympics.

== Career ==
Pasternack competed at the IBSF Junior World Championships 2021 and won a bronze medal in the two-woman event, along with Melanie Hasler, with a time of 2:20.51. She then represented Switzerland at the 2022 Winter Olympics and finished in sixth place in the two-woman event, along with Hasler. During the opening race of the 2022–23 Bobsleigh World Cup on 26 November 2022, she earned her first career Bobsleigh World Cup podium, finishing in second place with a time of 1:46.13.

In January 2023, she competed at the IBSF European Championships 2023 and won a silver medal in the two-woman event with a time of 1:55.36. The next month she competed at the IBSF World Championships 2023 and finished in fourth place in the two-woman event with a total time of 4:34.29. She competed at the IBSF European Championships 2026 and won a gold medal in the two-woman event with a time of 2:18.41, finishing 0.01 seconds ahead of the German team of Laura Nolte and Leonie Kluwig.
