= Freestyle skiing at the 2020 Winter Youth Olympics – Girls' slopestyle =

Girls' slopestyle at the III Winter Youth Olympic Games
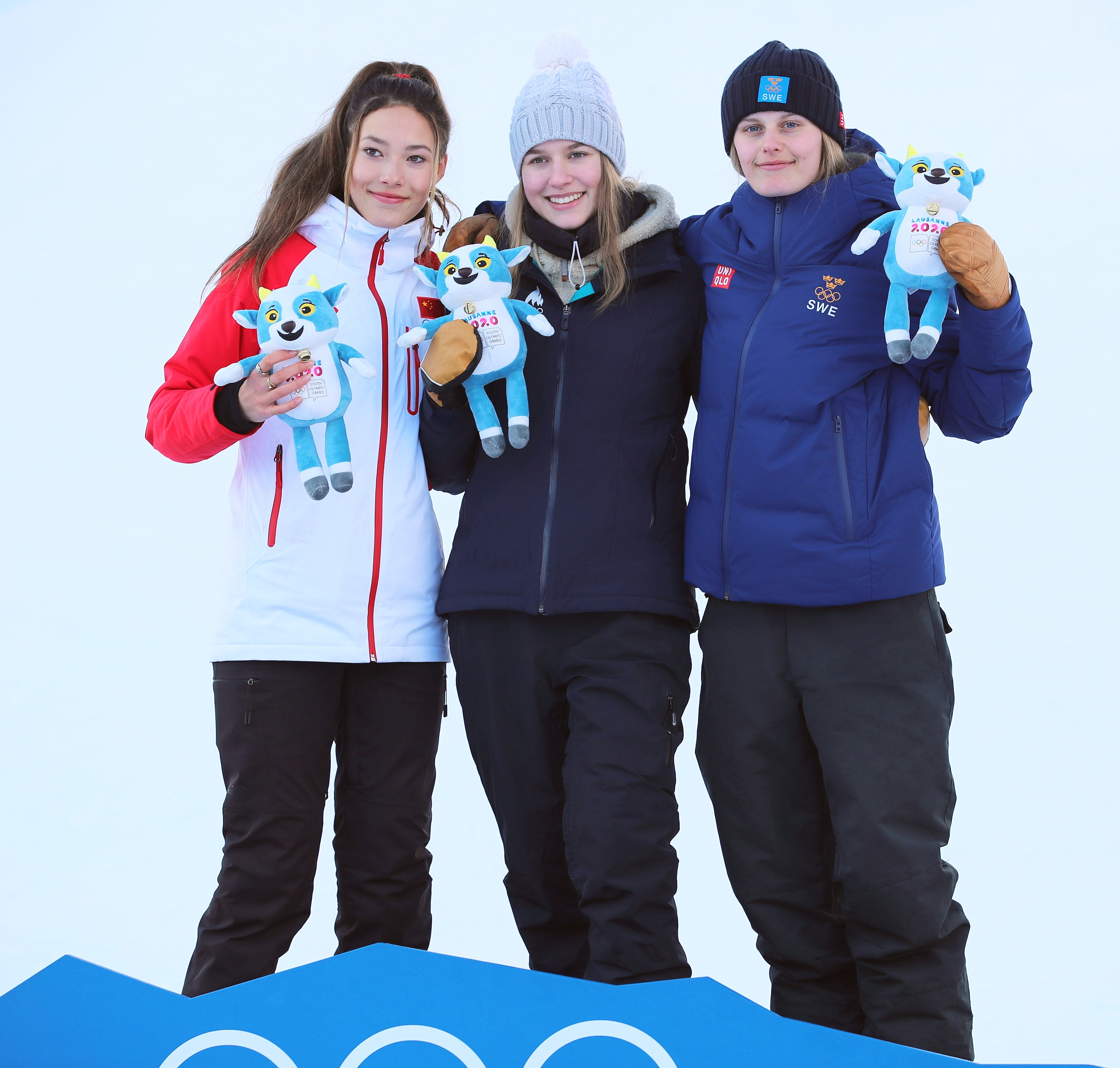
- Venue: Leysin Park & Pipe
- Dates: 18 January
- Competitors: 17 from 12 nations
- Winning points: 93.75

Medalists
1st place, gold medalist(s)		Kelly Sildaru	Estonia
2nd place, silver medalist(s)		Gu Ailing	China
3rd place, bronze medalist(s)		Jennie-Lee Burmansson	Sweden

The girls' slopestyle event in freestyle skiing at the 2020 Winter Youth Olympics took place on 18 January at the Leysin Park & Pipe.

== Qualification ==
The qualification was started at 09:30.

Rank	Bib	Name	Country	Run 1	Run 2	Best	Notes
1	3	Kelly Sildaru	Estonia	91.25	95.50	95.50	Q
2	6	Gu Ailing	China	83.25	14.50	83.25	Q
3	1	Jennie-Lee Burmansson	Sweden	40.75	79.25	79.25	Q
4	2	Kirsty Muir	Great Britain	13.25	77.50	77.50	Q
5	8	Abi Harrigan	Australia	51.00	65.50	65.50	Q
6	7	Rylee Hackler	Canada	64.75	21.25	64.75	Q
7	19	Jade Michaud	France	18.25	63.75	63.75	Q
8	14	Anna Chivina	Russia	61.00	46.75	61.00	Q
9	12	Wilma Johansson	Sweden	59.75	57.75	59.75	Q
10	21	Jenna Riccomini	United States	59.25	57.00	59.25	Q
11	11	Montana Osinski	United States	58.50	53.50	58.50	Q
12	18	Yuna Koga	Japan	37.25	43.50	43.50	Q
13	13	Alina Brezgina	Russia	35.75	38.00	38.00	
14	17	Antonia Langer	Chile	27.75	17.00	27.75	
15	9	Mia Rennie	Australia	16.75	7.75	16.75	
16	10	Anouk Andraska	Switzerland	9.50	15.00	15.00	
17	15	Yang Shuorui	China	10.75	8.50	10.75	
	4	Ruby Andrews	New Zealand	Did not start			
	5	Skye Clarke	Canada	Did not start			
	16	Ivana Mermillod Blondin	France	Did not start			
	20	Elsa Sjöstedt	Switzerland	Did not start			

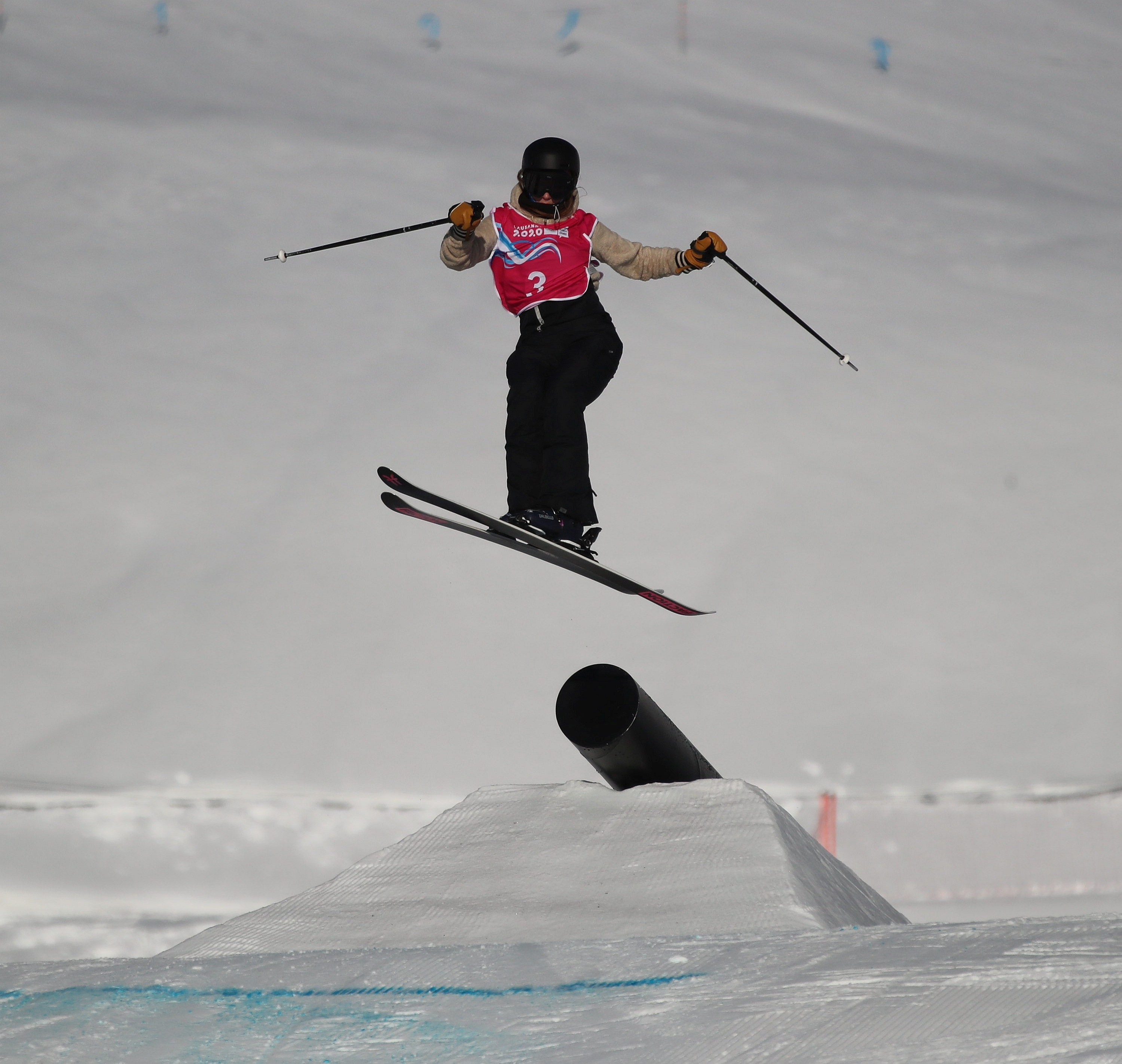
Kelly Sildaru

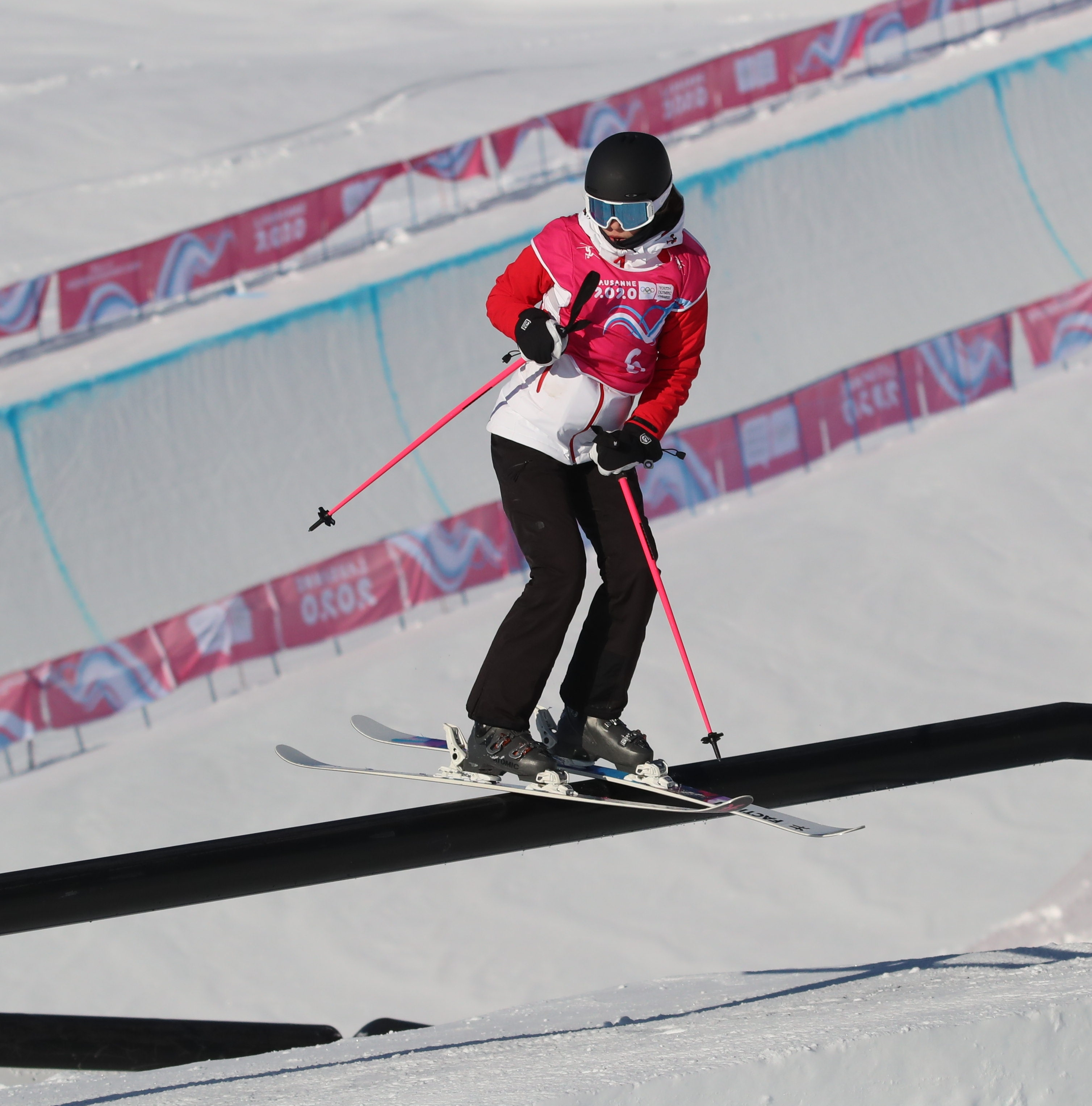
Gu Ailing

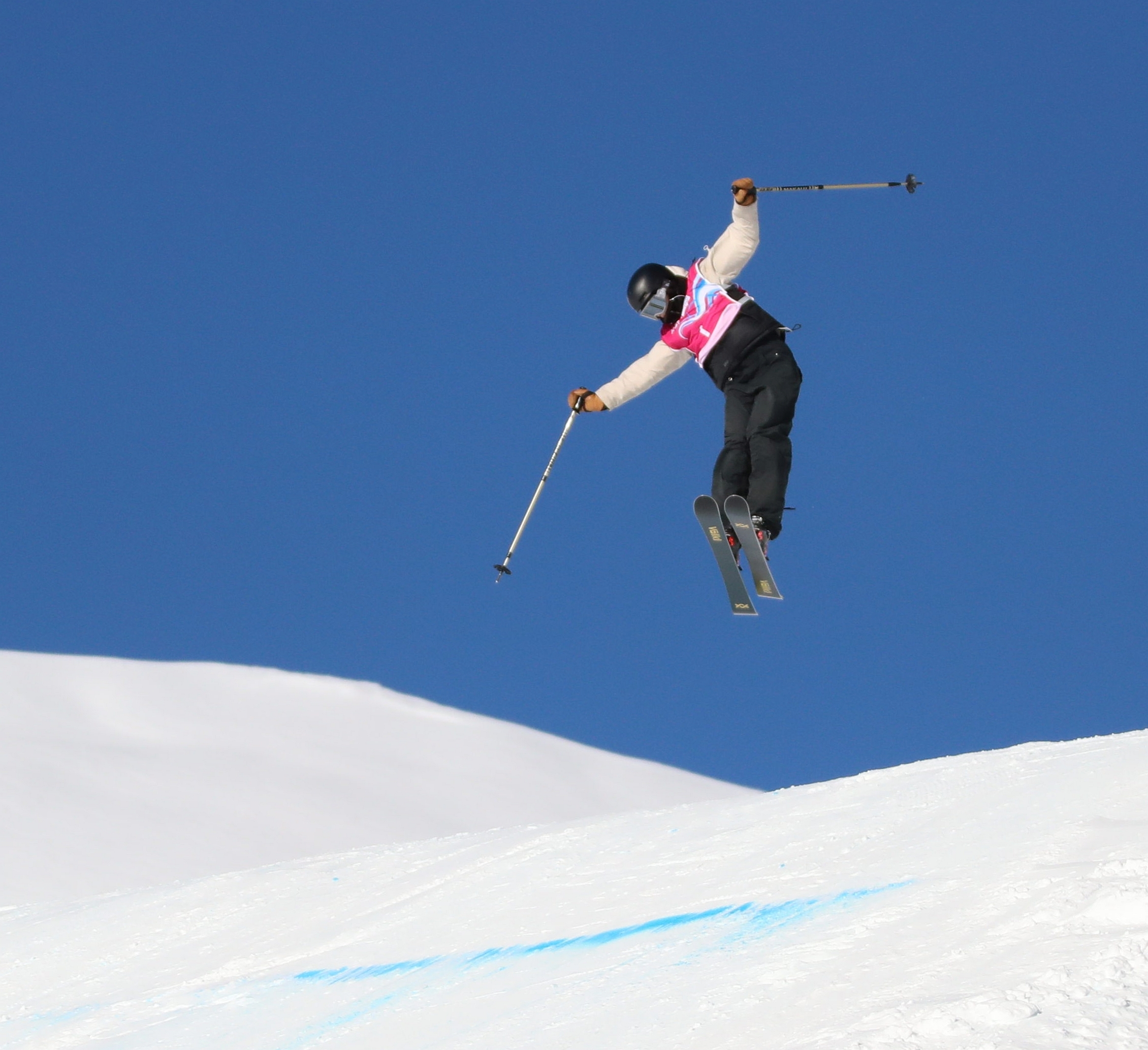
Jennie-Lee Burmansson

== Final ==
The final was started at 12:20.

Rank	Start order	Bib	Name	Country	Run 1	Run 2	Run 3	Best
1st place, gold medalist(s)	12	3	Kelly Sildaru	Estonia	91.50	93.75	71.50	93.75
2nd place, silver medalist(s)	11	6	Gu Ailing	China	87.00	26.50	93.25	93.25
3rd place, bronze medalist(s)	10	1	Jennie-Lee Burmansson	Sweden	88.50	90.00	75.50	90.00
4	9	2	Kirsty Muir	Great Britain	86.25	70.00	86.00	86.25
5	6	19	Jade Michaud	France	81.25	62.75	9.75	81.25
6	7	7	Rylee Hackler	Canada	9.50	12.75	65.00	65.00
7	5	14	Anna Chivina	Russia	8.50	56.25	10.50	56.25
8	3	21	Jenna Riccomini	United States	26.75	47.00	52.00	52.00
9	1	18	Yuna Koga	Japan	50.25	DNS	DNS	50.25
10	2	11	Montana Osinski	United States	21.75	42.50	40.75	42.50
11	4	12	Wilma Johansson	Sweden	2.50	22.25	DNS	22.25
12	8	8	Abi Harrigan	Australia	21.50	10.50	10.25	21.50

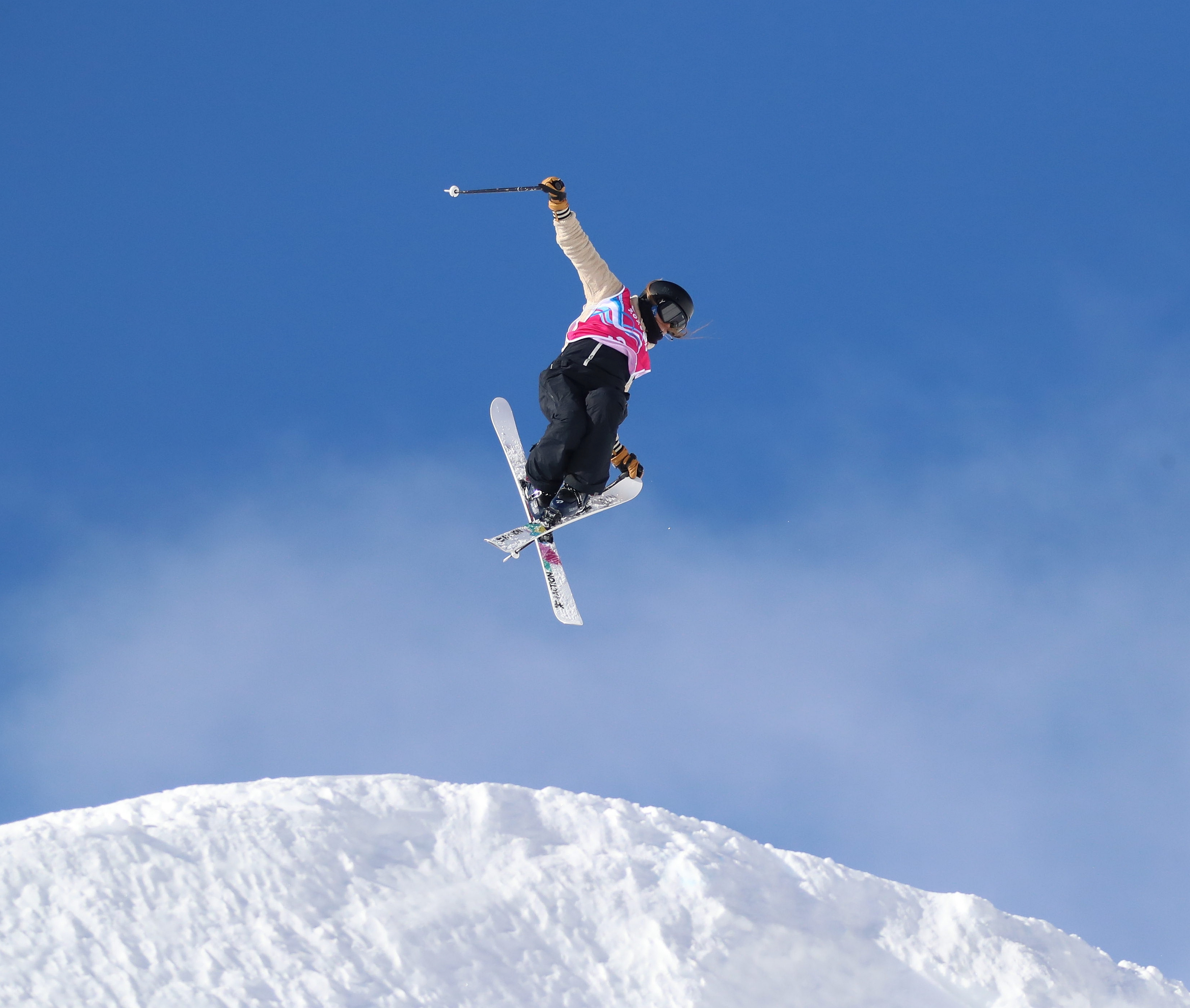
Kelly Sildaru

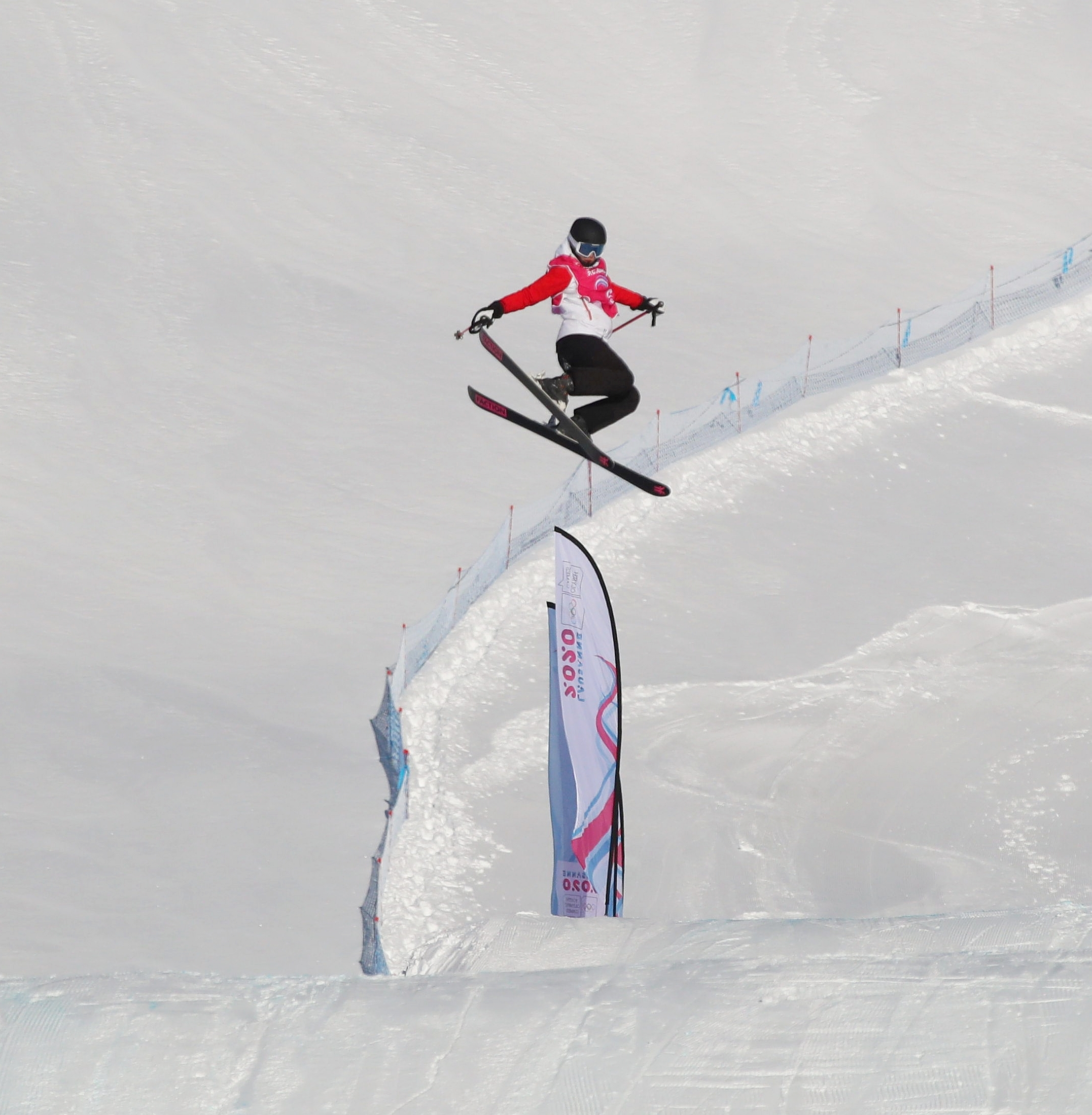
Gu Ailing

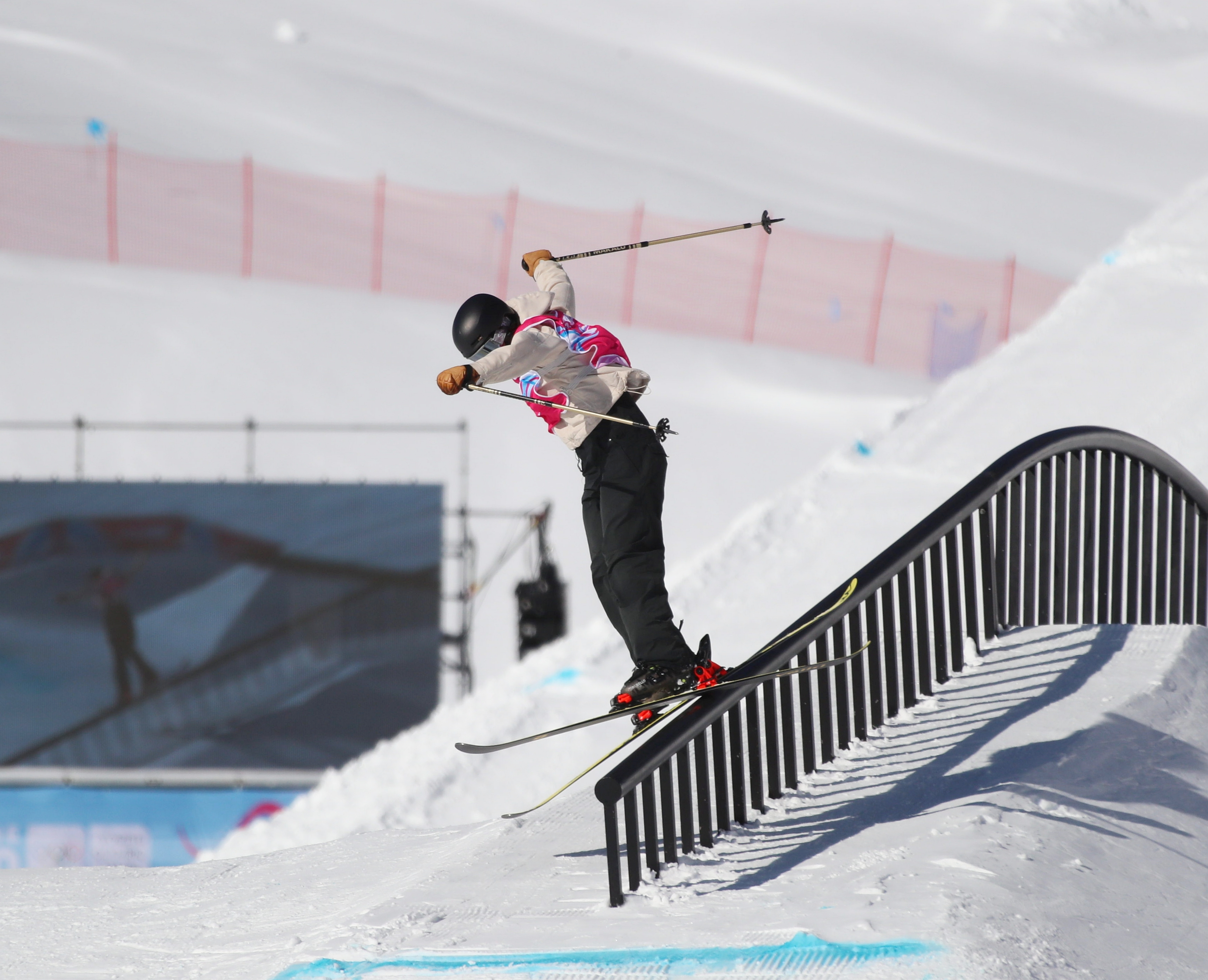
Jennie-Lee Burmansson
