= Austria at the 2026 Winter Olympics =

- Flag of Austria
- IOC code: AUT
- NOC: Austrian Olympic Committee
- Website: www.olympia.at

in Milan and Cortina d'Ampezzo, Italy 6 February 2026 – 22 February 2026
- Competitors: 115 (63 men and 52 women) in 14 sports
- Flag bearers (opening): Benjamin Karl & Anna Gasser
- Flag bearers (closing): Alessandro Hämmerle & Janine Flock
- Medals Ranked 9th: Gold 5 Silver 8 Bronze 5 Total 18

Winter Olympics appearances (overview)
- 1924; 1928; 1932; 1936; 1948; 1952; 1956; 1960; 1964; 1968; 1972; 1976; 1980; 1984; 1988; 1992; 1994; 1998; 2002; 2006; 2010; 2014; 2018; 2022; 2026

Austria competed at the 2026 Winter Olympics in Milan and Cortina d'Ampezzo, Italy, from 6 to 22 February 2026.

Snowboarders Benjamin Karl and Anna Gasser were the country's flagbearer during the opening ceremony. Meanwhile, snowboarder Alessandro Hämmerle and skeleton athlete Janine Flock were the country's flagbearer during the closing ceremony.

== Competitors ==
The following is the list of number of competitors participating at the Games per sport/discipline.

Sport	Men	Women	Total
Alpine skiing	11	11	22
Biathlon	4	5	9
Bobsleigh	8	4	12
Cross-country skiing	3	5	8
Figure skating	0	1	1
Freestyle skiing	7	6	13
Luge	6 (Note: Since Wolfgang Kindl will participate in both singles and doubles there will only be six athletes fulfilling quotas for seven.)	5	11
Nordic combined	3	—N/a	3
Short-track speed skating	1	0	1
Skeleton	2	1	3
Ski jumping	4	4	8
Ski mountaineering	1	1	2
Snowboarding	10	6	16
Speed skating	3	3	6
Total	63	52	115

== Medalists ==
The following Austrian competitors won medals at the games. In the discipline sections below, the medalists' names are bolded.

Medal	Name	Sport	Event	Date
Gold	Benjamin Karl	Snowboarding	Men's parallel giant slalom	8 February
Gold	Ariane Rädler; Katharina Huber	Alpine skiing	Women's team combined	10 February
Gold	Alessandro Hämmerle	Snowboarding	Men's snowboard cross	12 February
Gold	Janine Flock	Skeleton	Women's	14 February
Gold	Jan Hörl; Stephan Embacher	Ski jumping	Men's large hill super team	16 February
Silver	Sabine Payer	Snowboarding	Women's parallel giant slalom	8 February
Silver	Jonas Müller	Luge	Men's singles	8 February
Silver	Vincent Kriechmayr; Manuel Feller	Alpine skiing	Men's team combined	9 February
Silver	Johannes Lamparter	Nordic combined	Individual normal hill/10 km	11 February
Silver	Thomas Steu; Wolfgang Kindl	Luge	Men's doubles	11 February
Silver	Lisa Schulte; Thomas Steu; Wolfgang Kindl; Jonas Müller; Selina Egle; Lara Kipp	Luge	Team relay	12 February
Silver	Fabio Gstrein	Alpine skiing	Men's slalom	16 February
Silver	Johannes Lamparter	Nordic combined	Individual large hill/10 km	17 February
Bronze	Selina Egle; Lara Kipp	Luge	Women's doubles	11 February
Bronze	Cornelia Hütter	Alpine skiing	Women's super-G	12 February
Bronze	Jakob Dusek	Snowboarding	Men's snowboard cross	12 February
Bronze	Matěj Švancer	Freestyle skiing	Men's big air	17 February
Bronze	Stefan Rettenegger; Johannes Lamparter	Nordic combined	Team large hill/2 x 7.5 km	19 February

Medals by date
**Day**	**Date**	1st place, gold medalist(s)	2nd place, silver medalist(s)	3rd place, bronze medalist(s)	Total
1	7 February	0	0	0	0
2	8 February	1	2	0	3
3	9 February	0	1	0	1
4	10 February	1	0	0	1
5	11 February	0	2	1	3
6	12 February	1	1	2	4
8	14 February	1	0	0	1
10	16 February	1	1	0	2
11	17 February	0	1	1	2
12	18 February	0	0	1	1
Total		5	8	5	18

Medals by sport
Sport	1st place, gold medalist(s)	2nd place, silver medalist(s)	3rd place, bronze medalist(s)	Total
Snowboarding	2	1	1	**4**
Alpine skiing	1	2	1	**4**
Skeleton	1	0	0	**1**
Ski jumping	1	0	0	**1**
Luge	0	3	1	**4**
Nordic combined	0	2	1	**3**
Freestyle skiing	0	0	1	**1**
Total	5	8	5	18

Medals by gender
Gender	1st place, gold medalist(s)	2nd place, silver medalist(s)	3rd place, bronze medalist(s)	Total
Male	3	6	3	**13**
Female	2	1	2	**5**
Mixed	0	1	0	**1**
Total	5	8	5	18

Multiple medalists
**Name**	**Sport**	1st place, gold medalist(s)	2nd place, silver medalist(s)	3rd place, bronze medalist(s)	Total
Johannes Lamparter	Nordic combined	0	2	1	3
Jonas Müller	Luge	0	2	0	2
Thomas Steu	Luge	0	2	0	2
Wolfgang Kindl	Luge	0	2	0	2
Selina Egle	Luge	0	1	1	2
Lara Kipp	Luge	0	1	1	2

== Alpine skiing ==
Austria qualified one female and one male alpine skier through the basic quota.

Men

Athlete	Event	Run 1		Run 2		Total	
Athlete	Event	Time	Rank	Time	Rank	Time	Rank
Stefan Babinsky	Downhill	—N/a				1:54.73	26
Stefan Babinsky	Super-G	—N/a				1:27.04	21
Stefan Brennsteiner	Giant slalom	1:15.92	7	1:11.31	18	2:27.23	8
Manuel Feller	Slalom	DNF					
Patrick Feurstein	Giant slalom	1:16.46	13	1:11.38	20	2:27.84	16
Fabio Gstrein	Slalom	57.08	3	56.88	1	1:53.96	2nd place, silver medalist(s)
Raphael Haaser	Downhill	—N/a				1:53.50	15
Raphael Haaser	Super-G	—N/a				1:25.89	5
Raphael Haaser	Giant slalom	1:17.46	24	1:10.75	7	2:28.21	19
Daniel Hemetsberger	Downhill	—N/a				1:52.58	7
Vincent Kriechmayr	Downhill	—N/a				1:52.38	6
Vincent Kriechmayr	Super-G	—N/a				1:26.10	7
Michael Matt	Slalom	58.34	9	57.41	9	1:55.75	8
Marco Schwarz	Super-G	—N/a				1:26.68	14
Marco Schwarz	Giant slalom	1:16.66	18	1:10.62	2	2:27.28	9
Marco Schwarz	Slalom	58.10	7	57.69	14	1:55.79	10
Daniel Hemetsberger; Marco Schwarz	Team combined	1:53.07	8	52.83	13	2:45.90	11
Vincent Kriechmayr; Manuel Feller	Team combined	1:53.05	7	51.98	2	2:45.03	2nd place, silver medalist(s)
Stefan Babinsky; Fabio Gstrein	Team combined	1:53.10	10	52.35	8	2:45.45	8
Raphael Haaser; Michael Matt	Team combined	1:53.07	8	51.99	3	2:45.06	4

Women

Athlete	Event	Run 1		Run 2		Total	
Athlete	Event	Time	Rank	Time	Rank	Time	Rank
Nina Astner	Giant slalom	1:04.47	16	1:10.61	21	2:15.08	18
Stephanie Brunner	Giant slalom	1:04.97	20	DNF			
Katharina Gallhuber	Slalom	49.70	25	53.16	22	1:42.86	22
Lisa Hörhager	Giant slalom	1:06.47	32	DNF			
Lisa Hörhager	Slalom	50.13	32	53.82	24	1:43.95	25
Katharina Huber	Slalom	48.68	9	52.50	8	1:41.18	6
Cornelia Hütter	Downhill	—N/a				1:36.96	4
Cornelia Hütter	Super-G	—N/a				1:23.93	3rd place, bronze medalist(s)
Nina Ortlieb	Downhill	—N/a				DNF	
Nina Ortlieb	Super-G	—N/a				DNF	
Mirjam Puchner	Downhill	—N/a				1:37.65	11
Mirjam Puchner	Super-G	—N/a				DNF	
Ariane Rädler	Downhill	—N/a				1:37.20	8
Ariane Rädler	Super-G	—N/a				1:23.94	4
Julia Scheib	Giant slalom	1:04.36	11	1:09.83	5	2:14.19	5
Katharina Truppe	Slalom	48.77	10	52.33	4	1:41.10	5
Nina Ortlieb; Katharina Gallhuber	Team combined	1:37.60	9	45.03	11	2:22.63	7
Ariane Rädler; Katharina Huber	Team combined	1:36.65	2	45.01	10	2:21.66	1st place, gold medalist(s)
Cornelia Hütter; Katharina Truppe	Team combined	1:37.19	5	45.08	13	2:22.27	5
Mirjam Puchner; Lisa Hörhager	Team combined	1:38.18	14	45.99	17	2:24.05	14

== Biathlon ==
Austria qualified five female and four male biathletes through the 2024–25 Biathlon World Cup score.

Men

Athlete	Event	Time	Misses	Rank
Simon Eder	Individual	57:16.9	2 (0+0+1+1)	34
Simon Eder	Pursuit	35:34.0	3 (0+0+2+1)	36
Simon Eder	Sprint	25:31.0	2 (1+1)	46
Patrick Jakob	Individual	56:40.0	2 (1+0+1+0)	24
Patrick Jakob	Pursuit	37:54.6	5 (0+3+2+0)	55
Patrick Jakob	Sprint	25:37.4	2 (0+2)	49
Fabian Müllauer	Individual	1:01:17.4	7 (1+2+3+1)	73
Fabian Müllauer	Pursuit	35:36.7	5 (1+0+1+3)	37
Fabian Müllauer	Sprint	25:16.7	2 (0+2)	39
Dominic Unterweger	Individual	57:08.5	2 (1+0+1+0)	32
Dominic Unterweger	Sprint	26:29.7	3 (1+2)	73
Dominic Unterweger; Simon Eder; Fabian Müllauer; Patrick Jakob	Team relay	1:22:58.5	7 (0+7)	10

Women

Athlete	Event	Time	Misses	Rank
Anna Andexer	Individual	47:16.7	5 (1+3+0+1)	62
Anna Andexer	Pursuit	32:36.6	3 (1+1+0+1)	21
Anna Andexer	Sprint	21:50.2	0 (0+0)	9
Anna Andexer	Mass start	38:17.3	1 (0+0+1+0)	9
Anna Gandler	Individual	44:50.1	2 (0+2+0+0)	32
Anna Gandler	Pursuit	33:10.5	3 (1+0+1+1)	30
Anna Gandler	Sprint	22:35.2	1 (0+1)	32
Lisa Theresa Hauser	Individual	44:37.7	3 (0+0+0+3)	27
Lisa Theresa Hauser	Pursuit	33:08.9	4 (0+0+1+3)	29
Lisa Theresa Hauser	Sprint	22:31.2	2 (1+1)	30
Lisa Theresa Hauser	Mass start	40:26.5	5 (3+1+1+0)	26
Tamara Steiner	Individual	46:01.1	2 (0+2+0+0)	44
Anna Juppe	Sprint	24:08.8	3 (2+1)	75
Tamara Steiner; Anna Gandler; Anna Andexer; Lisa Theresa Hauser	Team relay	1:15:19.3	17 (2+15)	15

Mixed

Athlete	Event	Time	Misses	Rank
Dominic Unterweger; Simon Eder; Anna Gandler; Lisa Theresa Hauser	Relay	1:06:36.5	0+6	7

== Bobsleigh ==
Men

Athlete	Event	Run 1		Run 2		Run 3		Run 4		Total	
Athlete	Event	Time	Rank	Time	Rank	Time	Rank	Time	Rank	Time	Rank
Jakob Mandlbauer*; Daiyehan Nichols-Bardi	Two-man	56.34	21	56.67	22	56.21	21	Did not advance		2:49.22	21
Markus Treichl*; Daniel Bertschler	Two-man	55.89	13	55.76	5	55.62	9	55.74	10	3:43.01	9
Jakob Mandlbauer*; Daniel Bertschler; Sebastian Mitterer; Daiyehan Nichols-Bardi	Four-man	55.14	21	DNF							
Markus Treichl*; Kristian Huber; Markus Sammer; Sascha Stepan	Four-man	54.80	12	54.90	6	54.70	8	54.90	4	3:39.30	9

Women

Athlete	Event	Run 1		Run 2		Run 3		Run 4		Total	
Athlete	Event	Time	Rank	Time	Rank	Time	Rank	Time	Rank	Time	Rank
Katrin Beierl	Monobob	1:00.34	13	1:00.82	21	DNS				–	
Katrin Beierl*; Christania Williams	Two-woman	57.63	9	57.63	11	57.96	9	57.68	8	3:50.59	9
Lea Haslwanter*; Victoria Festin	Two-woman	58.10	23	58.20	23	58.61	22	Did not advance		2:54.91	24

== Cross-country skiing ==
Austria qualified one female and one male cross-country skier through the basic quota. Following the completion of the 2024–25 FIS Cross-Country World Cup, Austria qualified a further three female and two male athletes.

Distance
Men

Athlete	Event	Classical		Freestyle		Final		
Athlete	Event	Time	Rank	Time	Rank	Time	Deficit	Rank
Benjamin Moser	10 km freestyle	—N/a		22:05.4	26	—N/a		
Mika Vermeulen	10 km freestyle	—N/a		22:07.6	27	—N/a		
Mika Vermeulen	20 km skiathlon	24:58.0	38	24:31.7	45	50:00.7	+3:49.7	41

Women

Athlete	Event	Classical		Freestyle		Final		
Athlete	Event	Time	Rank	Time	Rank	Time	Deficit	Rank
Lisa Achleitner	10 km freestyle	—N/a		26:18.4	55	—N/a		
Katharina Brudermann	10 km freestyle	—N/a		25:50.4	41	—N/a		
Teresa Stadlober	10 km freestyle	—N/a		24:00.0	7	—N/a		
Teresa Stadlober	20 km skiathlon	28:53.9	17	26:47.2	5	56:11.6	+2:26.4	9
Teresa Stadlober	50 km classical	2:23:23.9	6	—N/a				
Magdalena Scherz	10 km freestyle	—N/a		26:24.7	58	—N/a		
Teresa Stadlober; Heidi Bucher; Katharina Brudermann; Lisa Achleitner	4 × 7.5 km relay	—N/a				1:20:33.8	+4:49.0	10

Sprint

Athlete	Event	Qualification		Quarterfinal		Semifinal		Final	
Athlete	Event	Time	Rank	Time	Rank	Time	Rank	Time	Rank
Michael Föttinger	Men's sprint	3:23.92	46	Did not advance					
Benjamin Moser	Men's sprint	3:19.04	33	Did not advance					
Heidi Bucher	Women's sprint	3:48.73	27 Q	4:06.62	6	Did not advance			
Magdalena Scherz	Women's sprint	3:51.41	35	Did not advance					
Michael Föttinger; Benjamin Moser	Men's team sprint	5:53.19	7	—N/a				18:39.37	7
Heidi Bucher; Magdalena Scherz	Women's team sprint	6:50.97	8	—N/a				21:30.95	10

== Figure skating ==
In the 2025 World Figure Skating Championships in Boston, the United States, Austria secured one quota in each of the women's singles.

Athlete	Event	SP/SD		FP/FD		Total	
Athlete	Event	Points	Rank	Points	Rank	Points	Rank
Olga Mikutina	Women's singles	61.72	17 Q	123.87	18	185.59	18

== Freestyle skiing ==
Moguls

Athlete	Event	Qualification								Final							
Athlete	Event	Run 1				Run 2				Run 1				Run 2			Rank
Athlete	Event	Time	Points	Total	Rank	Time	Points	Total	Rank	Time	Points	Total	Rank	Time	Points	Total	Rank
Avital Carroll	Women's moguls	26.46	54.71	71.60	11	27.27	60.55	76.49	3 Q	27.11	60.27	76.39	7 Q	27.06	55.71	71.89	7
Katharina Ramsauer	Women's moguls	28.47	44.40	58.93	23	29.28	45.62	59.19	16	Did not advance							

Dual moguls

Athlete	Event	1/16 Final	1/8 Final	Quarterfinal	Semifinal	Final	
Athlete	Event	Opposition Result	Opposition Result	Opposition Result	Opposition Result	Opposition Result	Rank
Avital Carroll	Women's dual moguls	Gerken Schofield (GBR); W 23–12	Giaccio (USA); L 20.5–14.5	Did not advance			
Katharina Ramsauer	Women's dual moguls	Laffont (FRA); L 29–6	Did not advance				

Park & Pipe

Athlete	Event	Qualification					Final				
Athlete	Event	Run 1	Run 2	Run 3	Best	Rank	Run 1	Run 2	Run 3	Best	Rank
Samuel Baumgartner	Men's halfpipe	24.50	DNI	—N/a	24.50	23	Did not advance				
Julius Forer	Men's big air	83.00	61.25	42.00	144.25	18	Did not advance				
Julius Forer	Men's slopestyle	16.20	32.55	—N/a	32.55	27	Did not advance				
Matěj Švancer	Men's big air	92.50	90.00	DNI	182.50	2 Q	91.75	95.25	96.00	191.25	3rd place, bronze medalist(s)
Matěj Švancer	Men's slopestyle	64.13	79.63	—N/a	79.63	4 Q	30.56	1.76	73.71	73.71	7
Lara Wolf	Women's big air	80.25	64.75	80.00	160.25	8 Q	93.50	21.00	76.25	169.75	5
Lara Wolf	Women's slopestyle	58.21	34.81	—N/a	58.21	9 Q	52.83	56.60	4.36	56.60	9

Ski cross
Men

Athlete	Event	Seeding		1/8 final	Quarterfinal	Semifinal	Final	
Athlete	Event	Time	Rank	Position	Position	Position	Position	Rank
Johannes Aujesky	Men's	1:07.89	15	3	Did not advance			
Christoph Danksagmüller	Men's	1:09.48	30	4	Did not advance			
Adam Kappacher	Men's	1:08.31	24	4	Did not advance			
Nicolas Lussnig	Men's	1:08.04	18	2 Q	3	Did not advance		

Women

Athlete	Event	Seeding		1/8 final	Quarterfinal	Semifinal	Final	
Athlete	Event	Time	Rank	Position	Position	Position	Position	Rank
Christina Födermayr	Women's	1:15.72	21	3	Did not advance			
Sonja Gigler	Women's	1:13.55	11	3	Did not advance			
Katrin Ofner	Women's	1:13.00	7	2 Q	3	Did not advance		

== Luge ==
Men

Athlete	Event	Run 1		Run 2		Run 3		Run 4		Total	
Athlete	Event	Time	Rank	Time	Rank	Time	Rank	Time	Rank	Time	Rank
Nico Gleirscher	Singles	53.273	6	53.412	8	53.053	4	53.235	7	3:32.973	5
Wolfgang Kindl	Singles	53.385	7	53.321	5	53.171	6	53.388	9	3:33.265	8
Jonas Müller	Singles	52.959	2	53.029	2	52.837	2	52.962	2	3:31.787	2nd place, silver medalist(s)
Juri Gatt; Riccardo Schöpf	Doubles	53.014	12	52.901	9	—N/a				1:45.915	11
Wolfgang Kindl; Thomas Steu	Doubles	52.485	2	52.669	4	—N/a				1:45.154	2nd place, silver medalist(s)

Women

Athlete	Event	Run 1		Run 2		Run 3		Run 4		Total	
Athlete	Event	Time	Rank	Time	Rank	Time	Rank	Time	Rank	Time	Rank
Hannah Prock	Singles	53.131	12	53.230	14	53.271	12	53.131	13	3:32.763	10
Lisa Schulte	Singles	52.945	8	52.921	6	53.070	9	53.126	12	3:32.062	7
Dorothea Schwarz	Singles	53.595	16	53.052	11	53.080	10	53.103	11	3:32.830	11
Selina Egle; Lara Kipp	Doubles	53.193	3	53.350	4	—N/a				1:46.543	3rd place, bronze medalist(s)

Mixed team relay

Athlete	Event	Women's singles		Men's doubles		Men's singles		Women's doubles		Total	
Athlete	Event	Time	Rank	Time	Rank	Time	Rank	Time	Rank	Time	Rank
Lisa Schulte; Thomas Steu / Wolfgang Kindl; Jonas Müller; Selina Egle / Lara Kipp	Team relay	55.959	5	55.370	4	54.727	2	56.158	2	3:42.214	2nd place, silver medalist(s)

== Nordic combined ==
Athlete	Event	Ski jumping			Cross-country		Total	
Athlete	Event	Distance	Points	Rank	Time	Rank	Time	Rank
Johannes Lamparter	Individual normal hill/10 km	104.5	127.4	6	29:39.4	3	30:00.4	2nd place, silver medalist(s)
Johannes Lamparter	Individual large hill/10 km	136.0	148.0	2	24:42.9	4	24:50.9	2nd place, silver medalist(s)
Stefan Rettenegger	Individual normal hill/10 km	99.0	127.5	4	29:57.0	5	30:17.0	4
Stefan Rettenegger	Individual large hill/10 km	129.0	133.1	11	24:46.7	5	25:54.7	8
Thomas Rettenegger	Individual normal hill/10 km	104.5	127.4	6	31:27.7	13	31:42.7	9
Thomas Rettenegger	Individual large hill/10 km	137.0	145.4	4	26:12.6	19	26:30.6	11
Stefan Rettenegger; Johannes Lamparter	Team large hill/2 × 7.5 km	240.0	224.4	5	41:11.3	4	41:40.3	3rd place, bronze medalist(s)

== Short-track speed skating ==
Austria qualified one male short-track speed skater after the conclusion of the 2025–26 ISU Short Track World Tour. Nico Andermann will be the first male Austrian short-track speed skater to compete in the winter olympics.

Athlete	Event	Heat		Quarterfinal		Semifinal		Final	
Athlete	Event	Time	Rank	Time	Rank	Time	Rank	Time	Rank
Nico Andermann	Men's 500 m	41.450	4	Did not advance					
Nico Andermann	Men's 1500 m	—N/a		2:17.869	4 q	2:16.519	4 QB	2:34.939	13

== Skeleton ==
Athlete	Event	Run 1		Run 2		Run 3		Run 4		Total	
Athlete	Event	Time	Rank	Time	Rank	Time	Rank	Time	Rank	Time	Rank
Florian Auer	Men's	57.53	19	56.91	14	57.06	18	56.86	15	3:48.36	17
Samuel Maier	Men's	56.89	12	57.23	19	56.55	13	56.53	13	3:47.20	14
Janine Flock	Women's	57.22	1	57.26	2	57.26	1	57.28	1	3:49.02	1st place, gold medalist(s)
Janine Flock; Samuel Maier	Mixed team	1:01.66	11	59.35	8	—N/a				2:01.01	9

== Ski jumping ==
Men
Individual

Athlete	Event	First round			Final round			Total	
Athlete	Event	Distance	Points	Rank	Distance	Points	Rank	Points	Rank
Stephan Embacher	Normal hill	100.5	125.0	19 Q	105.5	136.2	3	261.2	7
Stephan Embacher	Large hill	133.0	69.0	7 Q	136.0	74.4	5	284.1	7
Jan Hörl	Normal hill	101.5	128.5	13 Q	104.0	130.9	8	259.4	11
Jan Hörl	Large hill	134.5	71.7	5 Q	136.0	74.4	4	286.9	5
Stefan Kraft	Normal hill	98.0	124.1	24 Q	100.0	123.9	27	248.0	27
Stefan Kraft	Large hill	121.5	115.3	36	Did not advance				
Daniel Tschofenig	Normal hill	100.0	130.0	11 Q	101.5	125.0	15	255.0	15
Daniel Tschofenig	Large hill	DSQ							

Team

Athlete	Event	First round			Second round			Final round			Total	
Athlete	Event	Distance	Points	Rank	Distance	Points	Rank	Distance	Points	Rank	Points	Rank
Jan Hörl; Stephan Embacher	Super team large hill	269.5	291.2	1 Q	267.0	277.5	1 Q	Cancelled			568.7	1st place, gold medalist(s)

Women

Athlete	Event	First round			Final round			Total	
Athlete	Event	Distance	Points	Rank	Distance	Points	Rank	Points	Rank
Lisa Eder	Normal hill	95.0	130.4	5	100.0	126.9	3	257.3	4
Lisa Eder	Large hill	125.5	116.0	15	132.0	141.6	4	257.6	7
Lisa Hirner	Normal hill	93.0	108.6	30	98.5	112.5	18	221.1	24
Lisa Hirner	Large hill	120.5	111.3	18	124.0	115.9	18	227.2	18
Julia Mühlbacher	Normal hill	93.0	115.3	21	98.0	109.6	23	224.9	22
Julia Mühlbacher	Large hill	114.5	110.1	19	118.0	107.9	22	218.0	22
Meghann Wadsak	Normal hill	91.5	106.1	35	Did not advance			106.1	35
Meghann Wadsak	Large hill	114.5	90.4	38	Did not advance			90.4	36

Mixed

Athlete	Event	First round			Final			Total	
Athlete	Event	Distance	Points	Rank	Distance	Points	Rank	Points	Rank
Lisa Eder; Jan Hörl; Julia Mühlbacher; Stephan Embacher	Mixed team	390.0	497.6	5	398.5	530.2	3	1,027.8	5

== Ski mountaineering ==
Austria qualified one female and one male ski mountaineer through the 2025 ISMF World Championships.

Athlete	Event	Heat		Semifinal		Final	
Athlete	Event	Time	Rank	Time	Rank	Time	Rank
Paul Verbnjak	Men's sprint	2:58.39	6	Did not advance			
Johanna Hiemer	Women's sprint	3:19.98	5	Did not advance			
Paul Verbnjak; Johanna Hiemer	Mixed relay	—N/a				28:05.12	6

== Snowboarding ==
Alpine
Men

Athlete	Event	Qualification		Round of 16	Quarterfinal	Semifinal	Final	
Athlete	Event	Time	Rank	Opposition Time	Opposition Time	Opposition Time	Opposition Time	Rank
Benjamin Karl	Parallel giant slalom	1:26.49	3 Q	Bormolini (ITA); W	Prommegger (AUT); W	Mastnak (SLO); W	Kim (KOR); W	1st place, gold medalist(s)
Fabian Obmann	Parallel giant slalom	1:27.97	20	Did not advance				
Alexander Payer	Parallel giant slalom	1:27.71	17	Did not advance				
Andreas Prommegger	Parallel giant slalom	1:27.40	11 Q	Lee (KOR); W	Karl (AUT); L +0.12	Did not advance		

Women

Athlete	Event	Qualification		Round of 16	Quarterfinal	Semifinal	Final	
Athlete	Event	Time	Rank	Opposition Time	Opposition Time	Opposition Time	Opposition Time	Rank
Martina Ankele	Parallel giant slalom	1:37.58	23	Did not advance				
Sabine Payer	Parallel giant slalom	1:33.75	9 Q	Dekker (NED); W	Ledecká (CZE); W	Dalmasso (ITA); W	Maděrová (CZE); L +0.83	2nd place, silver medalist(s)
Claudia Riegler	Parallel giant slalom	1:35.43	16 Q	Ledecká (CZE); L +1.13	Did not advance			

Cross

Athlete	Event	Seeding		1/8 final	Quarterfinal	Semifinal	Final	
Athlete	Event	Time	Rank	Position	Position	Position	Position	Rank
Jakob Dusek	Men's	1:08.69	9	1	1	2	3	3rd place, bronze medalist(s)
Alessandro Hämmerle	Men's	1:08.56	7	1	2	2	1	1st place, gold medalist(s)
Lukas Pachner	Men's	1:09.75	18	3	Did not advance			
David Pickl	Men's	1:09.46	17	3	Did not advance			
Pia Zerkhold	Women's	1:14.14	7	1	2	3	Did not advance	
Jakob Dusek; Pia Zerkhold	Mixed team	—N/a			3	Did not advance		

Park & Pipe

Athlete	Event	Qualification					Final				
Athlete	Event	Run 1	Run 2	Run 3	Best	Rank	Run 1	Run 2	Run 3	Best	Rank
Florian Lechner	Men's halfpipe	12.25	13.50	—N/a	13.50	21	Did not advance				
Clemens Millauer	Men's big air	78.25	78.00	DNI	156.25	18	Did not advance				
Clemens Millauer	Men's slopestyle	32.03	25.40	—N/a	32.03	25	Did not advance				
Anna Gasser	Women's big air	81.75	74.75	84.75	159.50	9 Q	25.00	45.00	76.26	121.25	8
Anna Gasser	Women's slopestyle	73.50	38.35	—N/a	73.50	5 Q	46.95	27.35	28.26	46.95	10
Hanna Karrer	Women's big air	79.50	18.25	77.75	157.25	10 Q	65.50	18.75	23.50	89.00	12
Hanna Karrer	Women's slopestyle	53.88	13.35	—N/a	53.88	17	Did not advance				

== Speed skating ==
Austria qualified six speed skaters (three per gender) through performances at the 2025-26 ISU Speed Skating World Cup.

Athlete	Event	Race	
Athlete	Event	Time	Rank
Ignaz Gschwentner	Men's 500 m	36.07	29
Gabriel Odor	Men's 1000 m	DSQ	
Alexander Farthofer	Men's 1500 m	1:46.77	22
Gabriel Odor	Men's 1500 m	1:45.18	8
Alexander Farthofer	Men's 5000 m	6:26.07	18
Vanessa Herzog	Women's 1000 m	1:16.99	24
Jeannine Rosner	Women's 1000 m	1:18.41	30
Jeannine Rosner	Women's 1500 m	1:57.24	16
Jeannine Rosner	Women's 3000 m	4:08.42	19

Mass start

Athlete	Event	Semifinal			Final		
Athlete	Event	Points	Time	Rank	Points	Time	Rank
Alexander Farthofer	Men's	0	7:55.59	14	Did not advance		26
Gabriel Odor	Men's	3	7:52.45	7 Q	0	8:07.08	12
Anna Molnar	Women's	0	8:48.55	13	Did not advance		25
Jeannine Rosner	Women's	5	8:37.44	6 Q	3	8:36.68	8

== See also ==
- Austria at the 2026 Winter Paralympics
