= Sandra Eie =

Norwegian freestyle skier (born 1995)

Personal information
- Born: 14 November 1995 (age 30)

Sport
- Country: Norway
- Sport: Freestyle skiing
- Events: Slopestyle; Big air
- Club: Bærums SK
Medal record
Women's freestyle skiing
Representing Norway
World Championships
Silver medal – second place	2023 Bakuriani	Big air

Sandra Eie (born 14 November 1995) is a Norwegian freestyle skier who represents Bærums SK and competes internationally.

She competed in the FIS Freestyle Ski and Snowboarding World Championships 2021, where she placed fifth in women's ski big air, and 8th in women's ski slopestyle.

She won a silver medal at the FIS Freestyle Ski and Snowboarding World Championships 2023 – Women's ski big air.

She competed in Women's big air at the 2026 Winter Olympics, where she did not reach the final.

== Results ==
=== Olympic Winter Games ===
Year	Age	Slopestyle	Big Air
(China) 2022 Beijing	26	19	6
(Italy) 2026 Milano Cortina	30	–	26

=== World Championships ===
Year	Age	Slopestyle	Big Air
(United States) 2021 Aspen	25	8	8
(Georgia (country)) 2023 Bakuriani	27	4	2
(Switzerland) 2025 Engadin	29	DNS	9
