= Kotsar =

Kotsar is a surname. Notable people with the surname include:

- Kateryna Kotsar (born 2000), Ukrainian freestyle skier
- Maik Kotsar (born 1996), Estonian basketball player
