= FIS Freestyle Ski and Snowboarding World Championships 2019 – Women's ski slopestyle =

Women's ski slopestyle at the FIS Freestyle Ski and Snowboarding World Championships 2019
- Venue: Park City Mountain Resort
- Location: Utah, United States
- Dates: February 6
- Competitors: 22 from 14 nations

The Women's ski slopestyle competition at the FIS Freestyle Ski and Snowboarding World Championships 2019 will be held on February 6, 2019. Due to bad weather conditions, the competition was moved back one day.

== Qualification ==
The first four skiers of each heat qualify for the final.

=== Heat 1 ===
Rank	Bib	Name	Country	Run 1	Run 2	Best	Notes
	1	Yuki Tsubota	Canada				
	2	Julia Krass	United States				
	3	Kelly Sildaru	Estonia				
	4	Silvia Bertagna	Italy				
	5	Kea Kühnel	Germany				
	6	Tess Ledeux	France				
	7	Elena Gaskell	Canada				
	8	Margaux Hackett	New Zealand				
	9	Anastasia Tatalina	Russia				
	10	Coline Ballet-Baz	France				
	11	Lana Prusakova	Russia				

=== Heat 2 ===
Rank	Bib	Name	Country	Run 1	Run 2	Best	Notes
	1	Marin Hamill	United States				
	2	Lara Wolf	Austria				
	3	Sarah Höfflin	Switzerland				
	4	Maggie Voisin	United States				
	5	Caroline Claire	United States				
	6	Mathilde Gremaud	Switzerland				
	7	Isabel Atkin	Great Britain				
	8	Giulia Tanno	Switzerland				
	9	Johanne Killi	Norway				
	10	Anni Kärävä	Finland				
	11	Kateryna Kotsar	Ukraine				
