= Kirsty Muir =

Scottish freestyle skier (born 2004)

- Muir in 2026

Personal information
- Born: 5 May 2004 (age 22) Bucksburn-Kingswells, Aberdeen, Scotland

Sport
- Country: United Kingdom
- Sport: Freestyle skiing
- Events: Slopestyle; Big air
- Club: Aberdeen Snowsports
Medal record
Women's freestyle skiing
Representing Great Britain
Winter Youth Olympics
| Silver medal – second place | 2020 Lausanne | Big air |
Winter X Games
| Gold medal – first place | 2026 Aspen | Slopestyle |
| Silver medal – second place | 2026 Aspen | Big air |
| Bronze medal – third place | 2023 Aspen | Big air |
| Bronze medal – third place | 2023 Aspen | Slopestyle |

Kirsty Muir (born 5 May 2004) is a Scottish freestyle skier representing Great Britain who competes in big air and slopestyle. She came second in the big air event at the 2020 Winter Youth Olympics, and won the slopestyle competition at the 2026 Winter X Games.

== Career ==
Muir started skiing at Aberdeen Snowsports Centre at the age of three. She began with alpine skiing, before switching to freestyle skiing. At the 2018 British Championships, she won the big air, halfpipe and slopestyle events. That year, Muir became the first European skier to be awarded with Momentum Camp's Spirit of Sarah scholarship. This gave her the opportunity to attend a training camp at Blackcomb Glacier in Whistler. In 2019, she won the first Europa Cup Slopestyle event in which she competed, and won a medal in another Europa Cup event that season. She came second in the 2019 British Championships big air event. At the 2019 FIS Junior World Freestyle Skiing Championships, Muir came second and third in two of the events.

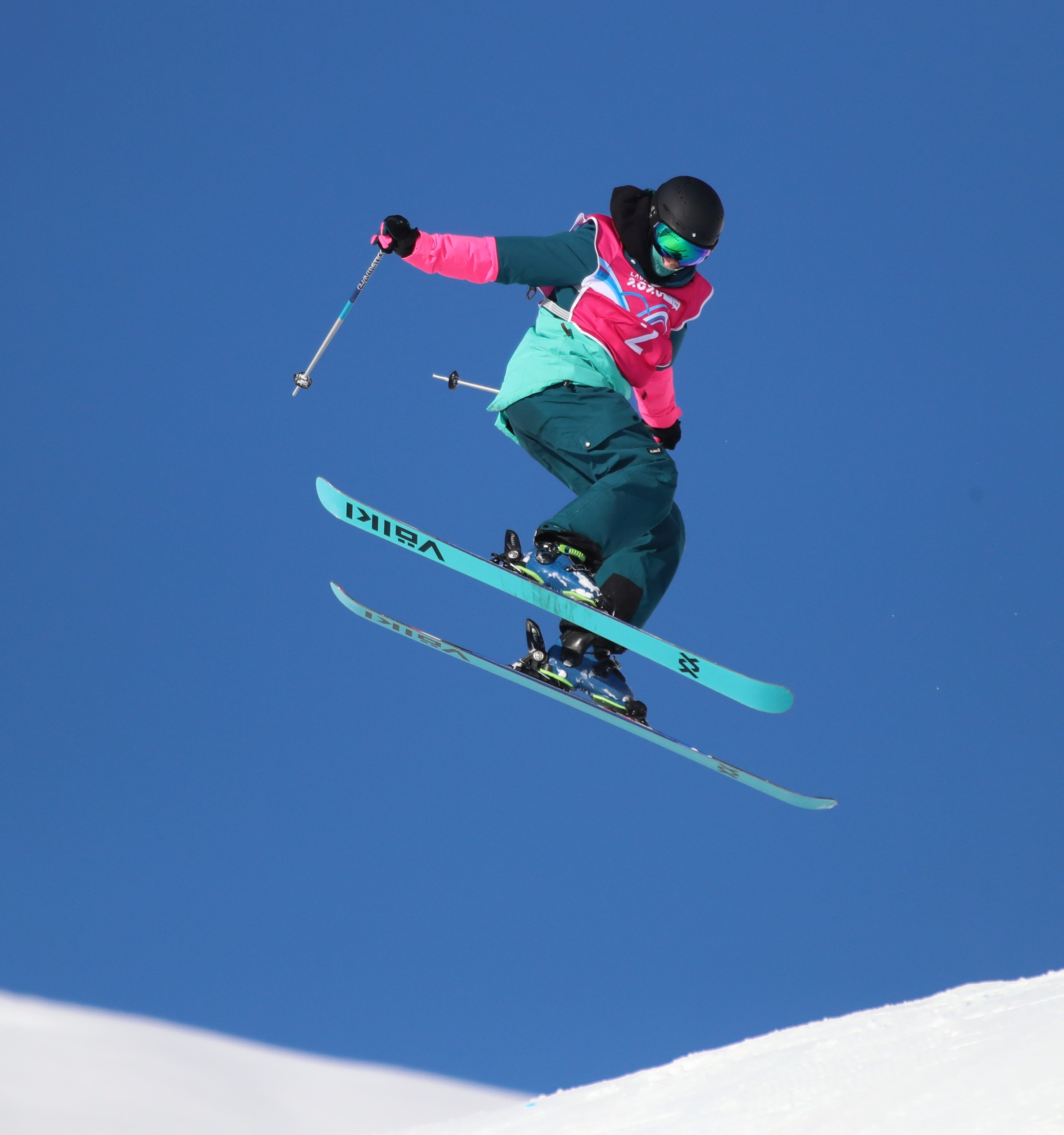
Muir in 2020

At the 2020 Winter Youth Olympics, Muir came second in the big air event, and fourth in the slopestyle event. She was Team GB's flagbearer at the closing ceremony of the Games. Muir competed in the FIS Freestyle Ski and Snowboarding World Championships 2021, where she placed sixth in women's ski slopestyle. She came second in the slopestyle event at the 2020–21 FIS Freestyle Ski World Cup competition in Aspen, Colorado, to seal her first ever World Cup medal. It was her fourth senior event.

Muir competed in the big air and slopestyle events at the 2022 Winter Olympics. She was the youngest Briton at the Games. She finished seventh in the qualification round of the big air event, and fifth overall in the final. After the first run in the final, Muir had been in third position, and she was the youngest finalist in the event. Muir came sixth in the slopestyle qualifying round, and eighth in the final, one place ahead of fellow Briton Katie Summerhayes. She was shortlisted for the 2022 Downdays Skier of the Year.

At the 2023 Winter X Games, Muir came third in the big air and slopestyle events. She finished second in the big air event in the Beijing leg of the 2023–24 FIS Freestyle Ski World Cup and third in the same event at Copper Mountain. In December 2023, Muir sustained a season ending knee injury, which was later diagnosed as a torn ACL and she underwent knee surgery in January 2024. Two months later, she underwent additional surgery on her shoulder. As part of her recovery, she was treated at the Red Bull centre in Los Angeles.

In March 2025, Muir claimed her first ever victory in a World Cup after triumphing in the slopestyle at Tignes, France. It was her first podium finish since 2023.

In November 2025, Muir was victorious in the big air at the 2025-26 World Cup meeting in Secret Garden, China. Her success marked the first time that she had topped the podium in a big air World Cup event. In January 2026, Muir won a slopestyle World Cup gold medal in an event at Aspen. She scored 80.62, her victory arriving a month after breaking her thumb. Later that month, Muir won her first X Games gold medal after claiming victory in the slopestyle with a score of 93.66. Her closest challenger, Naomi Urness, finished over eight points behind on 85. She then won a second medal in the competition, a silver in the big air, recording a score of 94 to finish behind Mathilde Gremaud who posted 94.66.

At the 2026 Winter Olympics, Muir qualified for the slopestyle final in third place. In the final, she finished fourth. She fell on her first run, before moving up to sixth place after her second, and eventually missed out on a bronze medal by 0.41 points behind third-placed Canadian rival Megan Oldham. She also qualified for the big air final in fourth place, and in the final finished fourth, 3.5 points behind Italian bronze medallist Flora Tabanelli. Muir scored 93 in her second run after performing a 1620 trick, but fell on her third while attempting a variation of the 1620.

Returning to the World Cup circuit in March, Muir won the slopestyle event in Tignes. She scored 82.78 to finish ahead of Canadian skier Elena Gaskell (76.60) who finished runner-up. The victory moved Muir to the top of the slopestyle World Cup standings with one event remaining. The following day, she finished sixth in the big air final. One week later, Muir finished runner-up in the slopestyle behind Swiss competitor Sarah Höfflin in Silvaplana. The result gave Muir the points she needed to secure her first Crystal Globe trophy for winning the overall ski slopestyle World Cup title as well as winning the park and pipe title awarded to the competitor with the highest combined points from the slopestyle and big air competitions. She also became the first British woman to achieve the feats.

== Personal life ==
Born on 5 May 2004, Muir is from Kingswells, Aberdeen, Scotland, and attended Bucksburn Academy. In February 2026, it was reported that Muir was in a relationship with BMX athlete Matt Harris who appeared on the first series of The Traitors (UK), however, Muir later confirmed on her social media that their relationship had ended.

== Honours ==
In 2022, Muir was awarded the Scottish Youth Award for Excellence in Mountain Culture.

== Major results ==
=== Olympic timeline ===
| Year | Event | Location | Position | Ref |
|---|---|---|---|---|
| 2022 | Big Air | (China) Beijing | 5th | |
| 2022 | Slopestyle | (China) Beijing | 8th | |
| 2026 | Slopestyle | (Italy) Milan-Cortina | 4th | |
| 2026 | Big Air | (Italy) Milan-Cortina | 4th | |

=== X Games medals ===
| Year | Event | Location | Position | Ref |
|---|---|---|---|---|
| 2023 | Slopestyle | (United States) Aspen | 3rd | |
| 2023 | Big Air | (United States) Aspen | 3rd | |
| 2026 | Slopestyle | (United States) Aspen | 1st | |
| 2026 | Big Air | (United States) Aspen | 2nd | |

=== World Cup medals ===
| Year | Event | Location | Position | Ref |
|---|---|---|---|---|
| 2020–21 | Slopestyle | (United States) Aspen | 2nd | |
| 2023–24 | Big Air | (China) Beijing | 2nd | |
| 2023–24 | Big Air | (United States) Copper Mountain | 3rd | |
| 2024–25 | Slopestyle | (France) Tignes | 1st | |
| 2025–26 | Big Air | (China) Secret Garden | 1st | |
| 2025–26 | Slopestyle | (United States) Aspen | 1st | |
| 2025–26 | Slopestyle | (France) Tignes | 1st | |
| 2025–26 | Slopestyle | (Switzerland) Silvaplana | 2nd | |
