= FIS Freestyle Ski and Snowboarding World Championships 2021 – Women's ski slopestyle =

Women's ski slopestyle at the FIS Freestyle Ski and Snowboarding World Championships 2021
- Venue: Aspen/Snowmass
- Location: Aspen, United States
- Date: 11 March (qualification); 13 March
- Competitors: 22 from 15 nations
- Winning points: 84.23

Medalists
gold medal	Gu Ailing	China
silver medal	Mathilde Gremaud	Switzerland
bronze medal	Megan Oldham	Canada

The Women's ski slopestyle competition at the FIS Freestyle Ski and Snowboarding World Championships 2021 was held on 13 March. A qualification was held on 11 March 2021.

== Qualification ==
The qualification was started on 11 March at 9:45. The eight best skiers qualified for the final.

Rank	Bib	Start order	Name	Country	Run 1	Run 2	Best	Notes
1	5	2	Gu Ailing	China	77.41	84.51	84.51	Q
2	7	1	Marin Hamill	United States	71.46	75.78	75.78	Q
3	4	5	Mathilde Gremaud	Switzerland	37.01	75.50	75.50	Q
4	3	10	Megan Oldham	Canada	72.85	13.46	72.85	Q
5	18	15	Kirsty Muir	Great Britain	57.30	70.43	70.43	Q
6	1	9	Tess Ledeux	France	69.23	65.11	69.23	Q
7	9	7	Lara Wolf	Austria	62.55	52.23	62.55	Q
8	8	4	Sandra Eie	Norway	61.55	29.00	61.55	Q
9	22	14	Kokone Kondo	Japan	51.28	60.20	60.20	
10	13	20	Rell Harwood	United States	53.55	44.43	53.55	
11	11	8	Katie Summerhayes	Great Britain	52.50	28.93	52.50	
12	16	21	Margaux Hackett	New Zealand	50.85	38.71	50.85	
13	24	13	Abi Harrigan	Australia	35.48	49.95	49.95	
14	6	6	Isabel Atkin	Great Britain	48.50	19.86	48.50	
15	23	16	Aliah Eichinger	Germany	37.30	37.15	37.30	
16	12	17	Silvia Bertagna	Italy	37.16	18.91	37.16	
17	20	12	Anni Kärävä	Finland	31.81	26.40	31.81	
18	15	19	Olivia Asselin	Canada	26.88	17.96	26.88	
19	17	11	Darian Stevens	United States	18.68	12.85	18.68	
20	25	18	Mia Rennie	Australia	14.95	16.38	16.38	
21	26	23	Dominique Ohaco	Chile	14.26	10.06	14.26	
22	19	24	Laura Wallner	Austria	10.61	7.46	10.61	
	2	3	Sarah Höfflin	Switzerland	Did not start			
	14	22	Maggie Voisin	United States	Did not start			

== Final ==
The final was started on 13 March at 09:30.

Rank	Bib	Start order	Name	Country	Run 1	Run 2	Run 3	Best
1st place, gold medalist(s)	5	8	Gu Ailing	China	84.23	40.65	27.15	84.23
2nd place, silver medalist(s)	4	6	Mathilde Gremaud	Switzerland	32.36	77.15	35.88	77.15
3rd place, bronze medalist(s)	3	5	Megan Oldham	Canada	15.75	74.23	76.18	76.18
4	1	3	Tess Ledeux	France	74.95	18.83	37.05	74.95
5	7	7	Marin Hamill	United States	70.21	71.18	64.80	71.18
6	18	4	Kirsty Muir	Great Britain	63.23	34.16	54.93	63.23
7	9	2	Lara Wolf	Austria	52.71	30.31	3.15	52.71
8	8	1	Sandra Eie	Norway	4.86	52.21	45.90	52.21
