= Avery Krumme =

American freestyle skier (born 2008)

Personal information
- Born: August 23, 2008 (age 18) Vancouver, Canada

Sport
- Country: Canada; United States
- Sport: Freestyle skiing
- Event: Slopestyle
Medal record
Women's freestyle skiing
Representing Canada
World Junior Championships
Bronze medal – third place	2024 Livigno	Slopestyle

Avery Krumme (born August 23, 2008) is a Canadian freestyle skier. Born in Canada, she has represented the United States since 2024. She represented the United States at the 2026 Winter Olympics.

== Early life ==
Krumme was raised in Squamish, British Columbia. She began skiing at the age of 3 thanks to her father Ray. She switched her nationality to represent the United States in 2024. Her parents helped her overcome a major injury during her junior career. Avery is a dual citizen and holds a passport through her mother, Rachel, who's from Texas.

== Career ==
Krumme competed at the 2024 FIS Freestyle Junior World Ski Championships and won a bronze medal in the slopestyle event.

In January 2026, she was selected to represent the United States at the 2026 Winter Olympics. During the slopestyle qualification she ranked fourth and advanced to the finals. During the event final she finished in 11th place with a score of 52.40.

== Results ==
=== Olympic Winter Games ===
Year	Age	Slopestyle	Big Air
(Italy) 2026 Milano Cortina	17	11	19
