= Anouk Andraska =

Swiss freestyle skier (born 2004)

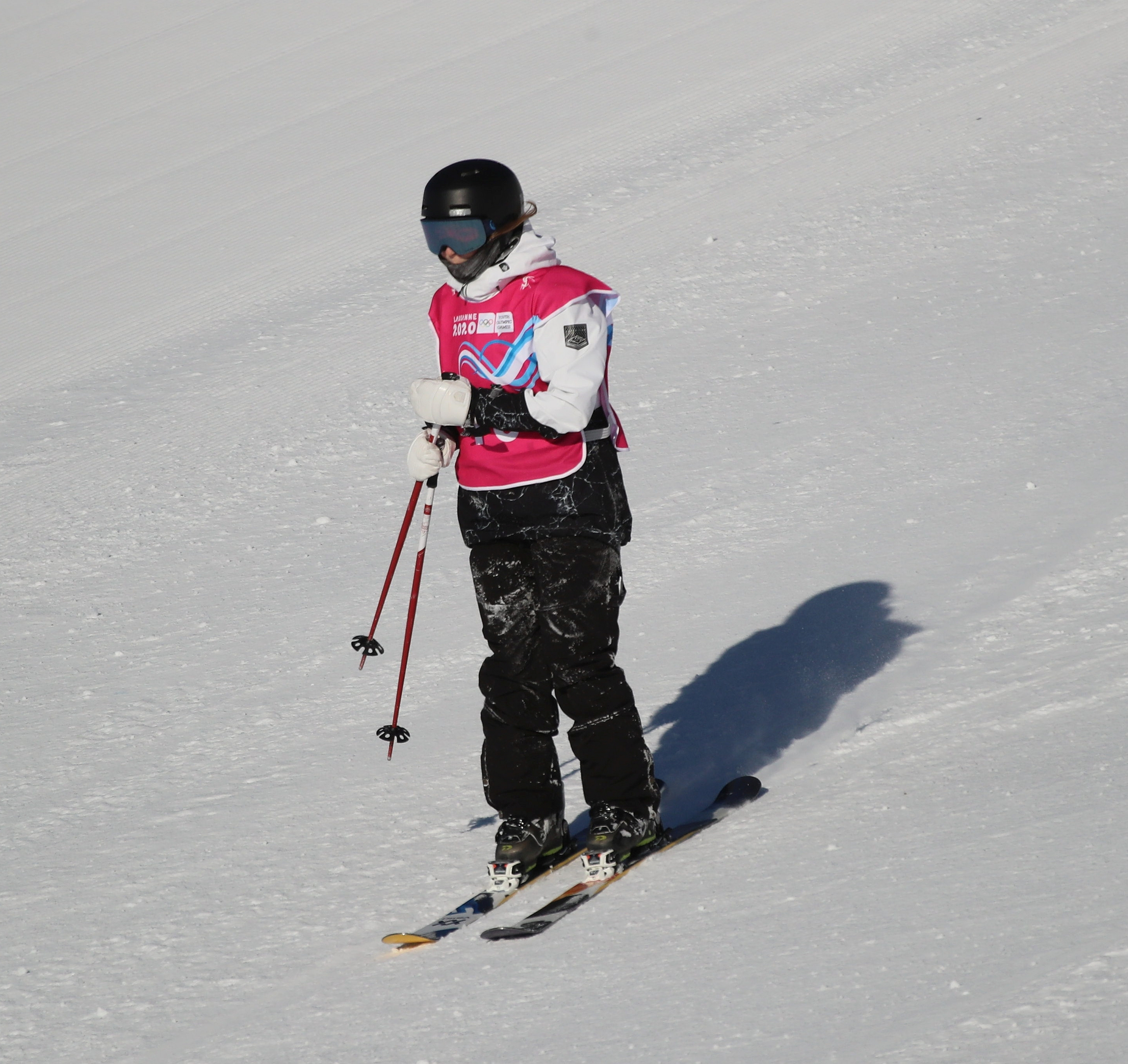
- Andraska at the 2020 Winter Youth Olympics

Personal information
- Born: 24 January 2004 (age 22) Uetikon am See, Switzerland

Sport
- Sport: Freestyle skiing
- Event(s): Big air, slopestyle

Anouk Andraska (born 24 January 2004) is a Swiss freestyle skier. She represented Switzerland at the 2026 Winter Olympics.

== Career ==
In January 2026, she was selected to represent Switzerland at the 2026 Winter Olympics. During the big air qualification, she scored 152.25 and advanced to the finals.

== Results ==
=== Olympic Winter Games ===
Year	Age	Slopestyle	Big Air
(Italy) 2026 Milano Cortina	22	12	26

=== World Championships ===
Year	Age	Slopestyle	Big Air
(Georgia (country)) 2023 Bakuriani	19	16	11
(Switzerland) 2025 Engadin	21	DNS	11
