= Freestyle skiing at the 2026 Winter Olympics – Women's big air =

Women's big air at the XXV Olympic Winter Games
- Freestyle skiing
- Venue: Livigno Snow Park, Valtellina
- Date: 14, 16 February 2026

Medalists
1st place, gold medalist(s)		Megan Oldham	Canada
2nd place, silver medalist(s)		Eileen Gu	China
3rd place, bronze medalist(s)		Flora Tabanelli	Italy

The women's big air competition in freestyle skiing at the 2026 Winter Olympics was held on 14 February (qualification) and 16 February (final), at the Livigno Snow Park in Valtellina. Megan Oldham of Canada won her first Olympic gold medal. Defending champion Eileen Gu of China won silver, and Flora Tabanelli of Italy bronze, her first Olympic medal.

== Background ==
The defending champion, Eileen Gu, qualified for the event, as did the 2022 bronze medalist, Mathilde Gremaud. The silver medalist, Tess Ledeux, missed the season due to an injury. There were only three events in 2025–26 FIS Freestyle Ski World Cup in big air before the Olympics; they were won by Kirsty Muir, Anni Kärävä, and Naomi Urness. Urness was leading the World Cup standings. Flora Tabanelli was the 2025 World champion.

== Results ==
=== Qualification ===
Q — Qualified for the Final

The top 12 athletes in the qualifiers advanced to the Final.

Rank	Bib	Order	Name	Country	Run 1	Run 2	Run 3	Total	Notes
1	4	5	Megan Oldham	Canada	91.25	56.00	80.50	171.75	Q
2	10	1	Eileen Gu	China	86.00	20.75	84.75	170.75	Q
3	2	7	Mathilde Gremaud	Switzerland	85.25	83.75	DNI	169.00	Q
4	6	6	Kirsty Muir	Great Britain	87.50	79.00	DNI	166.50	Q
5	7	9	Anni Kärävä	Finland	77.75	84.00	DNI	161.75	Q
6	1	4	Flora Tabanelli	Italy	81.50	37.00	80.00	161.50	Q
7	11	16	Naomi Urness	Canada	79.50	81.75	DNI	161.25	Q
8	8	8	Lara Wolf	Austria	80.25	64.75	80.00	160.25	Q
9	5	2	Liu Mengting	China	80.00	80.00	DNI	160.00	Q
10	26	23	Maria Gasslitter	Italy	78.00	78.00	DNI	156.00	Q
11	18	17	Kateryna Kotsar	Ukraine	79.75	75.75	DNI	155.50	Q
12	14	19	Anouk Andraska	Switzerland	47.25	72.25	80.00	152.25	Q
13	17	18	Giulia Tanno	Switzerland	23.50	79.75	71.75	151.50	
14	24	26	Grace Henderson	United States	86.75	52.5	DNI	139.25	
15	12	12	Muriel Mohr	Germany	73.50	20.25	65.00	138.50	
16	16	11	Yang Ruyi	China	70.75	66.00	DNI	136.75	
17	29	24	Skye Clarke	Canada	67.75	63.25	64.25	132.00	
18	22	21	Kim Dumont-Zanella	France	18.25	74.50	55.00	129.5	
19	21	13	Avery Krumme	United States	78.00	32.25	47.00	125.00	
20	19	20	Elena Gaskell	Canada	64.75	82.00	40.00	122.00	
21	25	22	Sylvia Trotter	New Zealand	83.00	20.75	38.00	121.00	
22	15	14	Marin Hamill	United States	48.5	65.25	50.25	115.50	
23	9	10	Rell Harwood	United States	11.25	54.25	47.00	101.25	
24	13	15	Ruby Star Andrews	New Zealand	44.5	48.25	DNI	92.75	
25	28	27	Yuna Koga	Japan	65.25	12.50	DNI	77.75	
26	27	25	Sandra Eie	Norway	19.00	DNI	36.00	36.00	
27	3	3	Sarah Höfflin	Switzerland	21.75 (A)	35.00	DNS	35.00	

=== Final ===
The final was delayed by 90 minutes due to adverse snow. Anouk Andraska and Mathilde Gremaud both injured themselves during the warm up and therefore did not start the final.

Rank	Bib	Order	Name	Country	Run 1	Run 2	Run 3	Total	Notes
1st place, gold medalist(s)	4	12	Megan Oldham	Canada	91.75	89.00	DNI	180.75	
2nd place, silver medalist(s)	10	11	Eileen Gu	China	90.00	61.25	89.00	179.00	
3rd place, bronze medalist(s)	1	7	Flora Tabanelli	Italy	90.00	84.00	94.25	178.25	
4	6	9	Kirsty Muir	Great Britain	81.75	93.00	DNI	174.75	
5	8	5	Lara Wolf	Austria	93.50	21.00	76.25	169.75	
6	11	6	Naomi Urness	Canada	86.75	16.75	82.00	168.75	
7	5	4	Liu Mengting	China	43.00	90.00	76.00	166.00	
8	7	8	Anni Kärävä	Finland	80.50	83.75	DNI	164.25	
9	26	3	Maria Gasslitter	Italy	78.00	81.25	DNI	159.25	
10	18	2	Kateryna Kotsar	Ukraine	82.00	72.00	74.00	156.00	
-	14	1	Anouk Andraska	Switzerland	DNS				
-	2	10	Mathilde Gremaud	Switzerland	DNS				
