= Flora Tabanelli =

Italian freestyle skier (born 2007)

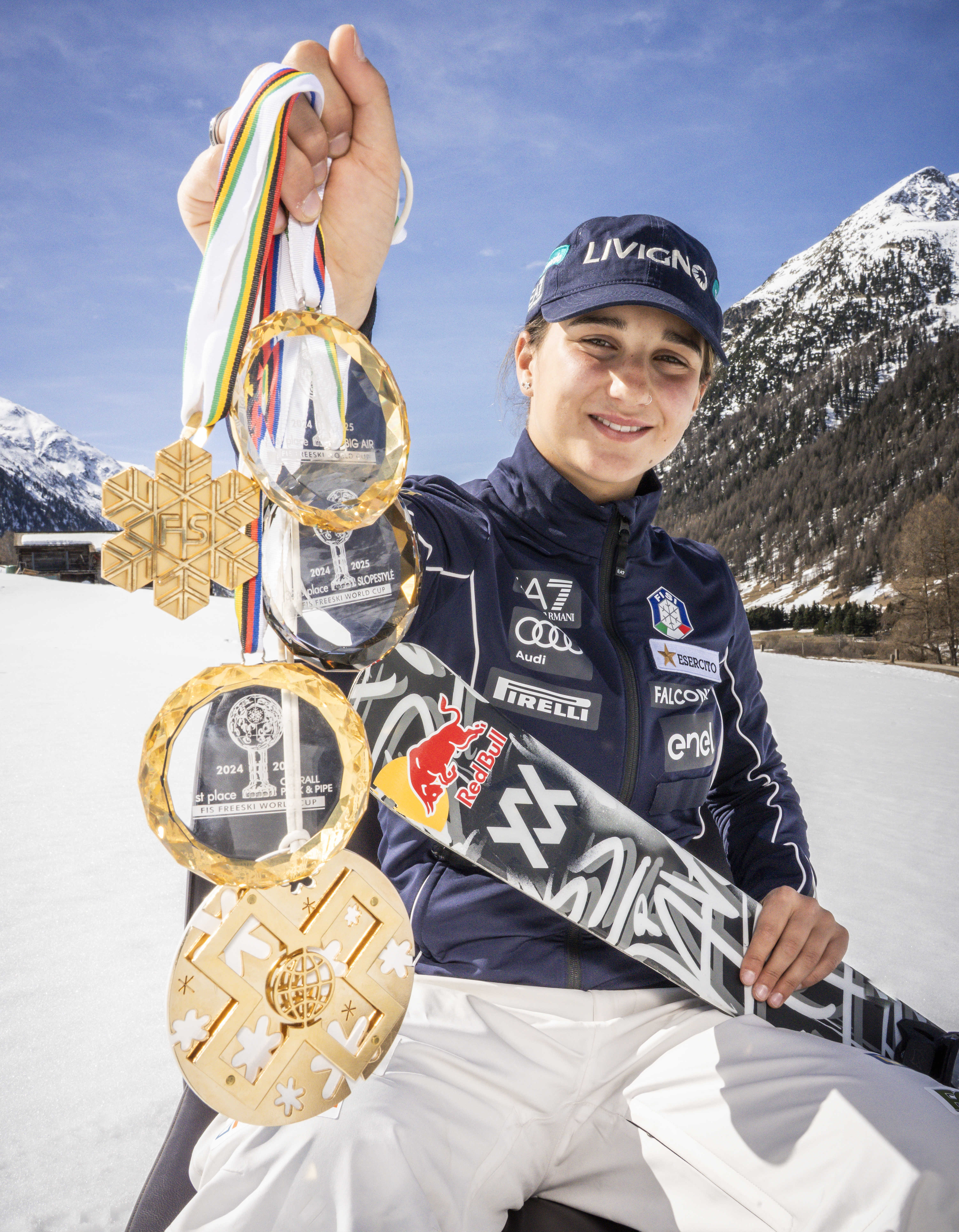
- Tabanelli in 2025

Personal information
- Born: 20 November 2007 (age 18) Bologna, Italy

Sport
- Sport: Freestyle skiing
Medal record
Women's freestyle skiing
Representing Italy
Olympic Games
Bronze medal – third place	2026 Milano Cortina	Big air
World Championships
Gold medal – first place	2025 Engadin	Big air
Youth Olympic Games
Gold medal – first place	2024 Gangwon	Big air
Gold medal – first place	2024 Gangwon	Slopestyle

Flora Tabanelli (born 20 November 2007) is an Italian freestyle skier. She is the 2026 Winter Olympic bronze medalist in big air.

== Career ==
Tabanelli represented Italy at the 2024 Winter Youth Olympics and was the flag-bearer during the Opening Ceremony. During the Youth Olympics she won gold medals in the big air and slopestyle events.

During the 2024–25 FIS Freestyle Ski World Cup, Tabanelli won the overall women's park & pipe crystal globe with 540 points across big air and slopestyle events. On 13 March 2025, she won the big air event, the same day her brother, Miro Tabanelli, won his first career World Cup event. They became the first brother-sister duo to earn a World Cup victory at the same competition.

She made her FIS Snowboard World Championships debut in 2025 and finished in fourth place in the slopestyle event. A week later, she then competed in the big air event and won a gold medal with a score of 176.75 points.

In November 2025, Tabanelli suffered a torn anterior cruciate ligament (ACL) in her right knee after she landed awkwardly from a jump while training with the national team for the 2026 Winter Olympics. In January 2026, she was selected to represent Italy at the 2026 Winter Olympics, after recently recovering from a serious knee injury. She made her Olympic debut during the big air event and won a bronze medal. During her third and final run she scored 94.25 for her 1620, the highest single-trick score of the day.

== Personal life ==
Tabanelli's older brother, Miro, is also an Olympic freestyle skier.

== Results ==
=== Olympic Winter Games ===
Year	Age	Slopestyle	Big Air
(Italy) 2026 Milano Cortina	18	–	3

=== World Championships ===
Year	Age	Slopestyle	Big Air
(Switzerland) 2025 Engadin	17	4	1

=== World Cup ===
==== Season standings ====
Season	Age	Overall	Slopestyle	Big Air
2024	16	5	14	3rd place, bronze medalist(s)
2025	17	1st place, gold medalist(s)	3rd place, bronze medalist(s)	1st place, gold medalist(s)
