= FIS Freestyle Ski and Snowboarding World Championships 2025 – Women's ski slopestyle =

Women's ski slopestyle at the FIS Freestyle Ski and Snowboarding World Championships 2025
- Location: Corvatsch, Switzerland
- Dates: 19 March (qualification); 21 March (final)
- Competitors: 25 from 14 nations
- Winning points: 85.65

Medalists
gold medal	Mathilde Gremaud	Switzerland
silver medal	Lara Wolf	Austria
bronze medal	Megan Oldham	Canada

The Women's ski slopestyle competition at the FIS Freestyle Ski and Snowboarding World Championships 2025 was held on 19 and 21 March 2025.

== Qualification ==
The qualification was started on 19 March at 08:55. The twelve best skiers qualified for the final.

Rank	Bib	Start order	Name	Country	Run 1	Run 2	Best	Notes
1	3	5	Flora Tabanelli	Italy	77.43	24.37	77.43	Q
2	2	8	Megan Oldham	Canada	55.44	72.51	72.51	Q
3	1	3	Mathilde Gremaud	Switzerland	22.97	70.92	70.92	Q
4	24	22	Lara Wolf	Austria	69.28	58.22	69.28	Q
5	4	1	Ruby Star Andrews	New Zealand	63.66	17.14	63.66	Q
6	14	15	Liu Mengting	China	62.65	37.17	62.65	Q
7	7	10	Anni Kärävä	Finland	17.68	61.29	61.29	Q
8	6	4	Marin Hamill	United States	60.64	60.03	60.64	Q
9	9	9	Kirsty Muir	Great Britain	58.97	8.05	58.97	Q
10	19	20	Kim Dumont-Zanella	France	57.92	27.61	57.92	Q
11	22	28	Madeleine Disbrowe	New Zealand	57.54	56.84	57.54	Q
12	11	11	Grace Henderson	United States	50.99	55.51	55.51	Q
13	17	12	Han Linshan	China	54.09	48.75	54.09	
14	13	18	Olivia Asselin	Canada	46.14	54.00	54.00	
15	15	14	Xiong Wenhui	China	47.81	53.01	53.01	
16	5	2	Sarah Höfflin	Switzerland	20.11	52.96	52.96	
17	18	19	Skye Clarke	Canada	49.14	51.76	51.76	
18	21	26	Yuna Koga	Japan	51.15	51.57	51.57	
19	8	6	Muriel Mohr	Germany	47.96	11.25	47.96	
20	27	23	Daisy Thomas	Australia	13.99	44.34	44.34	
21	25	24	Kate Gray	United States	39.84	43.35	43.35	
22	26	25	Kateryna Kotsar	Ukraine	10.99	40.54	40.54	
23	29	27	Kiho Sugawara	Japan	35.96	30.78	35.96	
24	16	16	Abi Harrigan	Australia	17.75	26.79	26.79	
25	12	17	Yang Ruyi	China	1.87	0.55	1.87	
	10	7	Kokone Kondo	Japan	Did not start			
	20	13	Anouk Andraska	Switzerland	Did not start			
	28	21	Sandra Eie	Norway	Did not start			

== Final ==
The final was started on 21 March at 12:15.

Rank	Bib	Start order	Name	Country	Run 1	Run 2	Best
1st place, gold medalist(s)	1	10	Mathilde Gremaud	Switzerland	85.65	42.22	85.65
2nd place, silver medalist(s)	24	9	Lara Wolf	Austria	72.81	73.33	73.33
3rd place, bronze medalist(s)	2	11	Megan Oldham	Canada	70.63	33.02	70.63
4	3	12	Flora Tabanelli	Italy	53.64	66.34	66.34
5	4	8	Ruby Star Andrews	New Zealand	17.04	60.91	60.91
6	9	4	Kirsty Muir	Great Britain	58.24	47.73	58.24
7	7	9	Anni Kärävä	Finland	57.63	7.92	57.63
8	14	7	Liu Mengting	China	57.42	55.01	57.42
9	11	1	Grace Henderson	United States	35.16	54.38	54.38
10	19	3	Kim Dumont-Zanella	France	49.98	25.24	49.98
11	6	5	Marin Hamill	United States	22.93	46.17	46.17
12	22	2	Madeleine Disbrowe	New Zealand	22.29	26.35	26.35
