= Maria Gasslitter =

Italian freestyle skier (born 2006)

Personal information
- Born: 1 October 2006 (age 19) Kastelruth, Italy

Sport
- Sport: Freestyle skiing

Maria Gasslitter (born 1 October 2006) is an Italian freestyle skier who specializes in slopestyle and big air. She represented Italy at the 2026 Winter Olympics.

== Career ==
Gasslitter was born in Castelrotto in South Tyrol, the daughter of the former freestyle skier Petra Moroder. She began practicing alpine skiing until the age of 13 and then approached freestyle.

In 2024, Gasslitter finished in 6th place in slopestyle and 9th place in big air at the FIS Freestyle Junior World Ski Championships. The following season, she won 5 round in the European Freestyle Cup.

In the 2025–26 season, Gasslitter made her debut in the freestyle World Cup in Stubai, Austria, finishing 22nd in slopestyle. On 9 January 2026, she finished in fifth place in Aspen, Colorado, U.S.

On 20 January 2026, Gasslitter was called up to participate in the 2026 Winter Olympics. On 7 February, she was able to qualify for the slopestyle final.

== Results ==
=== Olympic Winter Games ===
Year	Age	Slopestyle	Big Air
(Italy) 2026 Milano Cortina	19	10	9
