= Daniel Bertschler =

Austrian bobsledder (born 2001)

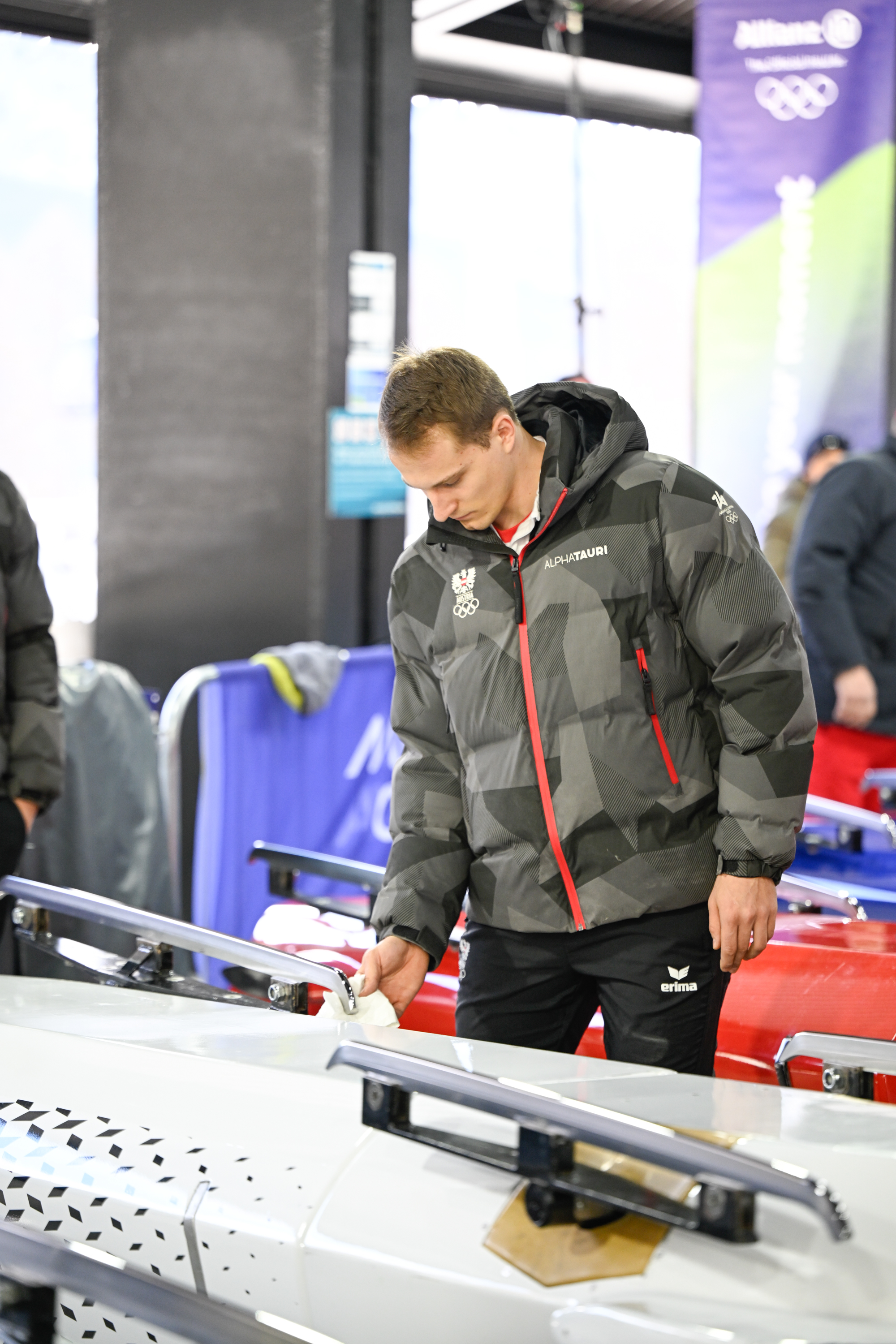
- Bertschler at the 2026 Winter Olympics in Cortina

Personal information
- Nationality: Austria
- Born: 22 January 2001 (age 25) Feldkirch
- Height: 184 cm (6 ft 0 in)
- Weight: 97 kg (214 lb)

Sport
- Country: Austria
- Sport: Bobsleigh; Track and Field
- Events: 2-man, 4-man Decathlon

Achievements and titles
- Personal bests: Decathlon: 7275; Indoor heptathlon : 5405 (NR U20); Pole vault: 5.10 m; High jump: 2.03 m

Daniel Bertschler (born 22 January 2001) is an Austrian bobsledder and former decathlete. He represented Austria at the 2026 Winter Olympics.

== Career ==
Bertschler began his sporting career in track and field. He represented Austria at the 2018 U18 European Championships in Győr, where he finished 17th in the decathlon. During his youth career, he set Austrian U18 and U20 records in the indoor heptathlon. He won his first senior gold medal in the decathlon at the 2020 Austrian Championships. In 2021, he won a gold medal in the heptathlon at the Austrian Indoor Combined Events Championships, and later that year claimed another national title in the outdoor decathlon.

Bertschler began competing in bobsleigh in 2024. He participated in the 2026 Winter Olympics in 2-man and 4-man. For 2-man, he pushed the sled of Markus Treichl, and the duo finished 9th. In the 4-man, he was part of the team of Jakob Mandlbauer. The 4-man team crashed during their second run, and did not finish the event.

== Education ==
Bertschler is a civil engineer, specialised in structural engineering. He studied civil and environmental engineering at the University of Innsbruck, where he developed a focus on structural engineering. Prior to his university studies, he attended HTL Rankweil, where he specialised in civil engineering as well (Bautechnik – Tiefbau).

== Bobsleigh results ==
All results are sourced from the International Bobsleigh and Skeleton Federation (IBSF).

=== Olympic Games ===
Event	Two-man	Four-man
(Italy) 2026 Milano Cortina	9th	DNF

=== World Championships ===
Event	Two-man	Four-man
(United States) 2025 Lake Placid	29th	—
