= Ruby Star Andrews =

New Zealand freestyle skier (born 2004)

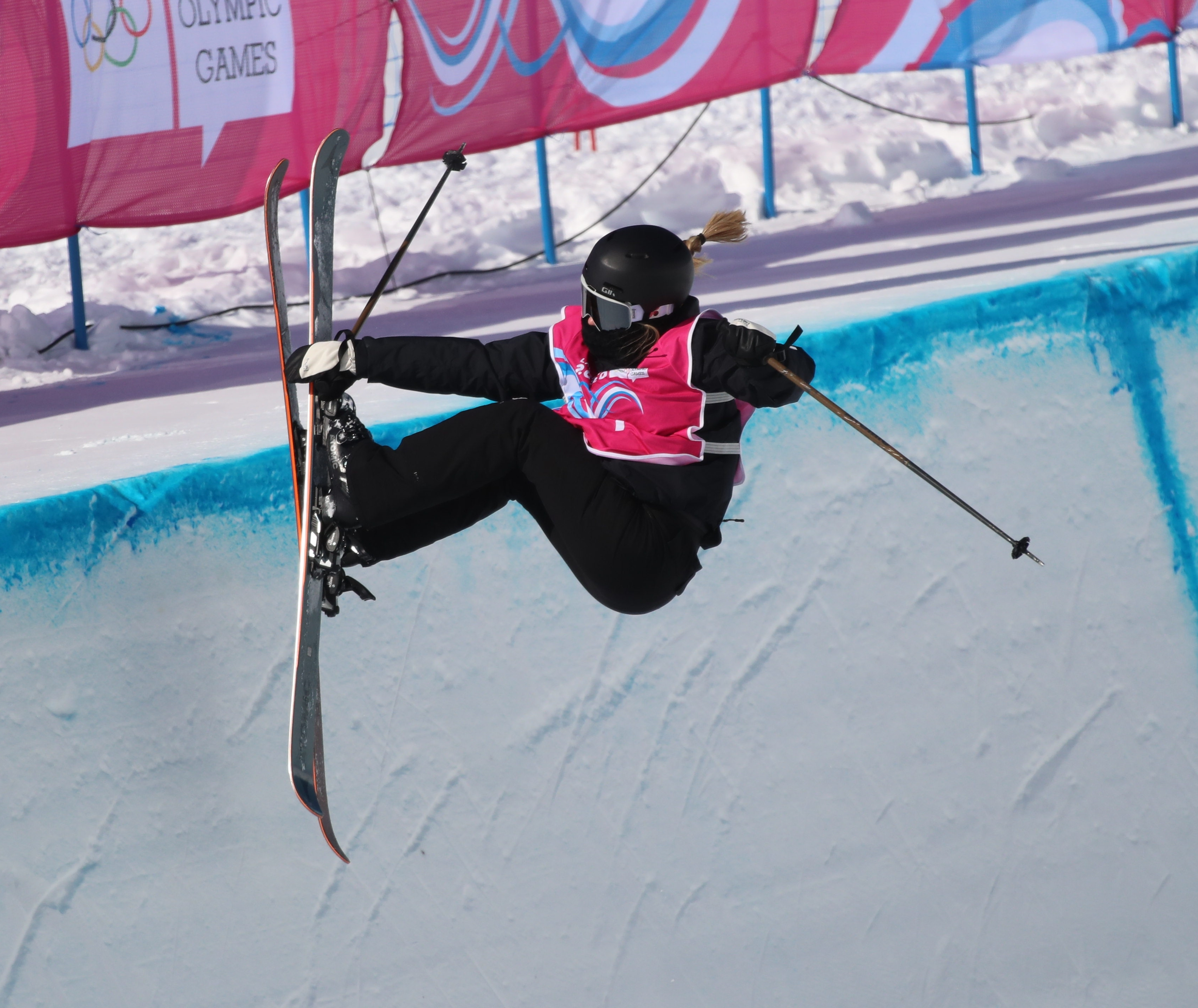
- Andrews at the 2020 Winter Youth Olympics

Personal information
- Born: 29 December 2004 (age 21) Christchurch, New Zealand

Sport
- Country: New Zealand
- Sport: Freestyle skiing
- Events: Big air, Slopestyle

Ruby Star Andrews (born 29 December 2004) is a New Zealand freestyle skier. She represented New Zealand at the 2026 Winter Olympics.

== Early life ==
Andrews was born in Christchurch on 29 December 2004. When she was four years old, she moved with her family to Queenstown. She was educated at Wakatipu High School and online through Te Aho o Te Kura Pounamu.

== Career ==
Andrews competed at the 2020 Winter Youth Olympics and finished in fifth place in the halfpipe event after battling through a heel injury.

During the 2022–23 FIS Freestyle Ski World Cup, she earned her first career World Cup podium on 4 February 2023, finishing in third place. During the 2023–24 FIS Freestyle Ski World Cup, she earned her second career World Cup podium on 23 November 2023, again finishing in third place.

In March 2025, she competed at the 2025 FIS Freestyle Ski World Championships and finished in fifth place in the slopestyle event with a score of 60.91. On 30 October 2025, she was conditionally selected to represent New Zealand at the 2026 Winter Olympics. In November 2025, she dislocated her hip. In January 2026, she was officially named to the Olympics roster.

== Results ==
=== Olympic Winter Games ===
Year	Age	Slopestyle	Big Air
(Italy) 2026 Milano Cortina	21	17	24

=== World Championships ===
Year	Age	Slopestyle	Big Air
(Georgia (country)) 2023 Bakuriani	18	6	DNS
(Switzerland) 2025 Engadin	20	5	17
