= Marin Hamill =

American freestyle skier (born 2001)

Personal information
- Born: April 5, 2001 (age 24) Salt Lake City, Utah, U.S.

Sport
- Country: United States
- Sport: Freestyle skiing
- Events: Slopestyle; Big air

Marin Hamill (born April 5, 2001) is an American freestyle skier who competes internationally.

== Career ==
She competed in the FIS Freestyle Ski and Snowboarding World Championships 2021, where she placed fifth in women's ski slopestyle. She competed in the 2022 Winter Olympics in the Women's Slopestyle and Big Air events, placing twelfth (injury) and fourteenth respectively. Hamill advanced to the slopestyle final but could not compete after injuring her right leg in a crash. She returned to the United States for medical treatment. Following surgeries for an anterior cruciate ligament injury and meniscus tear, Hamill returned to competition in 2024.

Hamill won the gold medal in the Women's Ski Knuckle Huck event at the 2026 Winter X Games in Aspen.

== Results ==
=== Olympic Winter Games ===
Year	Age	Slopestyle	Big Air
(China) 2022 Beijing	20	DNS	6
(Italy) 2026 Milano Cortina	24	16	22

=== World Championships ===
Year	Age	Slopestyle	Big Air
(United States) 2021 Aspen	21	5	17
(Switzerland) 2025 Engadin	23	11	19
