= Megan Oldham =

Canadian freestyle skier (born 2001)

- Oldham in 2026

Personal information
- Born: May 12, 2001 (age 25) Newmarket, Ontario, Canada

Sport
- Country: Canada
- Sport: Freestyle skiing
- Events: Slopestyle, Big air
Medal record
Women's freestyle skiing
Representing Canada
Olympic Games
Gold medal – first place	2026 Milano Cortina	Big air
Bronze medal – third place	2026 Milano Cortina	Slopestyle
World Championships
Silver medal – second place	2023 Bakuriani	Slopestyle
Bronze medal – third place	2021 Aspen	Slopestyle
Bronze medal – third place	2023 Bakuriani	Big air
Bronze medal – third place	2025 Engadin	Slopestyle
Winter X Games
Gold medal – first place	2020 Norway	Big air
Gold medal – first place	2023 Aspen	Big air
Gold medal – first place	2023 Aspen	Slopestyle
Silver medal – second place	2021 Aspen	Big air
Silver medal – second place	2022 Aspen	Big air
Bronze medal – third place	2021 Aspen	Slopestyle
Bronze medal – third place	2022 Aspen	Slopestyle

Megan Oldham (born May 12, 2001) is a Canadian freestyle skier who competes internationally in the big air and slopestyle disciplines. She is an Olympic champion and two-time medalist, winning gold in the Big air event and bronze in the Slopestyle in 2026.

== Early life ==
Megan Oldham was born on May 12, 2001 in Newmarket, Ontario and grew up in Parry Sound, Ontario. She is a graduate of Parry Sound High School.

== Career ==
Oldham joined the Canadian national team in 2018. In January 2019, Oldham won her first FIS World Cup medal, a silver, in the slopestyle event. In March 2019, Oldham won her first World Cup gold and took home the 2019 Slopestyle Crystal Globe.

Oldham competed at her first World Championships in 2021. She won the bronze medal in the slopestyle and fourth in the big air.

Oldham won two medals at the 2022 Winter X Games: a silver in big air and a bronze in the slopestyle.

On January 24, 2022, Oldham was named to Canada's 2022 Olympic team in the big air and slopestyle events. She earned a fourth-place finish in Big Air.

In January 2023, while competing in the X Games, Oldham became the first woman to land a triple cork in any women's ski or snowboard event. She landed a leftside triple cork 1440 while competing in Women’s Ski Big Air, and won a gold medal in that event. She won her second gold at the 2023 X Games in women's ski slopetyle.

On January 20, 2026, Oldham was named to Canada's 2026 Olympic team in the big air and slopestyle events. She won a bronze medal in slopestyle and a gold medal in freeski big air.

On February 16, 2026, Megan Oldham captured Canada’s second gold of the 2026 Winter Olympic at Milan-Cortina Games by winning gold at the big air freestyle skiing event, finishing with a score of 180.75 points.

== Results ==
=== Olympic Winter Games ===
Year	Age	Slopestyle	Big Air
(China) 2022 Beijing	20	13	4
(Italy) 2026 Milano Cortina	24	3	1

=== World Championships ===
Year	Age	Slopestyle	Big Air
(United States) 2021 Aspen	21	3	7
(Georgia (country)) 2023 Bakuriani	22	2	3
(Switzerland) 2025 Engadin	23	3	5

=== World Cup ===
==== Season standings ====
Season	Age	Overall	Slopestyle	Big Air
2019	19	10	1st place, gold medalist(s)	10
2020	20	51	14	4
2021	21	17	14	9
2022	22	8	4	15
2023	23	6	5	3rd place, bronze medalist(s)
2025	25	8	2nd place, silver medalist(s)	15
