= Kateryna Kotsar =

Ukrainian freestyle skier (born 2000)

Personal information
- Born: 27 June 2000 (age 26) Kyiv, Ukraine
- Education: Kyiv National I. K. Karpenko-Kary Theatre, Cinema and Television University

Sport
- Country: Ukraine
- Sport: Freestyle skiing
- Events: Slopestyle, Big air

Kateryna Kotsar (born 27 June 2000) is a Ukrainian freestyle skier who competes internationally in the big air and slopestyle disciplines.

== Career ==
Kotsar debuted during the 2018–19 World Cup in Stubai, Austria, where she finished 28th in slopestyle. Her first World Cup final was on 21 October 2022 in Chur, Switzerland, where she finished 6th in big air. On 13 December 2025, Kotsar finished 2nd in big air behind Canadian Naomi Urness at the World Cup stage in Steamboat, US, thus becoming the first Ukrainian to achieve a World Cup podium in any discipline other than aerials.

As of 2025, Kotsar participated in two World Championships (2023 and 2025), though she was expected to debut in 2019 but the slopestyle competition was cancelled. Her best finish as of 2025 is 5th in big air in the 2023 competition.

Between March 2017 and February 2025, Kotsar won four competitions (three in big air and one in slopestyle) and finished 2nd twice (once in big air and once in slopestyle) at the Europe Cup competitions.

Kotsar qualified for the 2026 Winter Olympics, competing in big air and slopestyle. Ahead of the competition, she was ordered by the International Olympic Committee to remove the slogan "Be brave like Ukrainians" from her helmet; although she had worn the helmet since 2022, it was prohibited by the IOC as a political display. Kotsar replaced the phrase with a Ukrainian flag for the Games.

== Personal life ==
Kotsar graduated from the Kyiv National I. K. Karpenko-Kary Theatre, Cinema and Television University where she studied audiovisual arts and production.

After qualifying for the women's big air final at the 2026 Olympics, Kotsar became engaged to her boyfriend Bohdan Fashtryha.

== Results ==
=== Olympic Winter Games ===
Year	Age	Slopestyle	Big Air
(Italy) 2026 Milano Cortina	25	14	10

=== World Championships ===
Year	Age	Slopestyle	Big Air
(Georgia (country)) 2023 Bakuriani	22	15	5
(Switzerland) 2025 Engadin	24	22	10

=== World Cup ===
==== Individual podiums ====
Season	Place	Event	Rank
2025–26	Steamboat, United States	Big air	2

==== Individual rankings ====
Season	Slopestyle	Big Air	Park & Pipe	Overall
2018–19	37	—	—N/a	190
2019–20	Missed			
2020–21	28	20	35	—N/a
2021–22	30	25	50	—N/a
2022–23	21	12	27	—N/a
2023–24	27	12	36	—N/a
2024–25	26	11	26	—N/a
2025–26	TBD	4	TBD	—N/a

=== European Cup ===
==== Podiums ====
Season	Place	Event	Rank
2016–17	Pec pod Sněžkou, Czech Republic	Slopestyle	2
2018–19	Jasná, Slovakia	Slopestyle	1
2020–21	Corvatsch, Switzerland (EC Premium)	Big air	3
2022–23	La Clusaz, France	Big air	1
2022–23	Stubai, Austria	Big air	2
2023–24	St. Anton, Austria	Big air	1
2024–25	Kotelnica, Poland	Big air	1
2025–26	Kotelnica, Poland	Big air	1

== See also ==
- Vladyslav Heraskevych, Ukrainian skeleton racer and 2026 Olympian who was disqualified for wearing a helmet with images of athletes killed in the war
- Oleh Handei, Ukrainian speed skater and 2026 Olympian who was ordered to change his helmet with a purportedly political slogan
