= Freestyle skiing at the 2026 Winter Olympics – Women's slopestyle =

Women's slopestyle at the XXV Olympic Winter Games
- Freestyle skiing
- Venue: Livigno Snow Park , Valtellina
- Date: 7, 9 February 2026
- Winning points: 86.96

Medalists
1st place, gold medalist(s)		Mathilde Gremaud	Switzerland
2nd place, silver medalist(s)		Eileen Gu	China
3rd place, bronze medalist(s)		Megan Oldham	Canada

The women's slopestyle competition in freestyle skiing at the 2026 Winter Olympics was held on 7 February (qualification) and 9 February (final), at the Livigno Snow Park in Valtellina. Mathilde Gremaud of Switzerland successfully defended her 2022 title, and the 2022 silver medalist, Eileen Gu, representing China, won the silver again. Megan Oldham of Canada won bronze, her first Olympic medal.

== Background ==
The defending champion Mathilde Gremaud and the silver medalist Eileen Gu both qualified for the event. The bronze medalist Kelly Sildaru did not qualify. The field also included the 2018 champion Sarah Höfflin. There were only three events in 2025–26 FIS Freestyle Ski World Cup in slopestyle before the Olympics; they were won by Gremaud, Kirsty Muir and Gu. Gremaud and Marin Hamill were leading the World Cup standings. Gremaud was also the 2025 World champion. Gremaud, Gu, and Muir qualified for the finals, Hamill and Höfflin did not.

== Summary ==
In the finals, only Gremaud and Gu got more than 80 points for their performance, and it was essentially competition between them. Gu led after the first run with 86.58, against Gremaud's 83.60. However, in the second run Gremaud improved to 86.96, which was sufficient for gold, and Gu did not improve. The third run was unsuccessful for both of them. Oldham was in the third position with 69.76 after the first run, and in the third run improved to 76.46. The only other athlete to perform above 70 points was Muir. After two unsuccessful runs, she got 76.05 in the third run, but this was not sufficient for a medal.

== Results ==
=== Qualification ===
Q — Qualified for the Final

The top 12 athletes in the qualifiers move on to the medal round.

Rank	Bib	Order	Name	Country	Run 1	Run 2	Best	Notes
1	1	6	Mathilde Gremaud	Switzerland	76.68	79.15	79.15	Q
2	7	2	Eileen Gu	China	1.26	75.30	75.30	Q
3	3	10	Kirsty Muir	Great Britain	63.18	64.98	64.98	Q
4	16	17	Avery Krumme	United States	47.43	64.93	64.93	Q
5	20	19	Han Linshan	China	43.93	62.98	62.98	Q
6	10	8	Anni Kärävä	Finland	62.91	1.16	62.91	Q
7	2	1	Megan Oldham	Canada	61.05	59.13	61.05	Q
8	26	25	Naomi Urness	Canada	48.75	58.40	58.40	Q
9	5	7	Lara Wolf	Austria	58.21	34.81	58.21	Q
10	17	12	Giulia Tanno	Switzerland	17.60	57.01	57.01	Q
11	21	18	Liu Mengting	China	47.98	55.10	55.10	Q
12	19	16	Maria Gasslitter	Italy	54.66	51.03	54.66	Q
13	11	5	Sarah Höfflin	Switzerland	21.73	54.50	54.50	
14	27	23	Kateryna Kotsar	Ukraine	36.03	50.78	50.78	
15	18	14	Grace Henderson	United States	0.60	49.78	49.78	
16	9	3	Marin Hamill	United States	47.91	30.91	47.91	
17	8	4	Ruby Star Andrews	New Zealand	38.93	45.83	45.83	
18	28	24	Yuna Koga	Japan	35.66	42.90	42.90	
19	15	11	Yang Ruyi	China	10.38	42.45	42.45	
20	25	26	Sylvia Trotter	New Zealand	24.30	35.58	35.58	
21	23	21	Skye Clarke	Canada	26.96	9.93	26.96	
22	22	20	Kim Dumont Zanella	France	0.50	22.85	22.85	
23	14	13	Elena Gaskell	Canada	0.96	15.06	15.06	
	6	9	Rell Harwood	United States	Did not start			
	18	15	Kokone Kondo	Japan	Did not start			
	24	22	Daisy Thomas	Australia	Did not start			

=== Final ===
Rank	Bib	Order	Name	Country	Run 1	Run 2	Run 3	Best
1st place, gold medalist(s)	1	12	Mathilde Gremaud	Switzerland	83.60	86.96	15.46	86.96
2nd place, silver medalist(s)	7	11	Eileen Gu	China	86.58	23.00	1.65	86.58
3rd place, bronze medalist(s)	2	6	Megan Oldham	Canada	69.76	38.70	76.46	76.46
4	3	10	Kirsty Muir	Great Britain	37.15	63.01	76.05	76.05
5	21	2	Liu Mengting	China	67.46	13.66	11.28	67.46
6	17	3	Giulia Tanno	Switzerland	65.85	41.31	56.55	65.85
7	26	5	Naomi Urness	Canada	24.65	46.03	64.73	64.73
8	10	7	Anni Kärävä	Finland	49.61	13.80	63.51	63.51
9	5	4	Lara Wolf	Austria	52.83	56.60	4.36	56.60
10	19	1	Maria Gasslitter	Italy	50.33	52.45	26.53	52.45
11	16	9	Avery Krumme	United States	52.40	29.96	0.86	52.40
	20	8	Han Linshan	China	DNS			
