= Jakob Mandlbauer =

Austrian bobsledder (born 1998)

Personal information
- Nationality: Austrian
- Born: 24 November 1998 (age 27) Bruck an der Mur, Austria
- Height: 180 cm (5 ft 11 in)
- Weight: 92 kg (203 lb)

Sport
- Sport: Bobsleigh

Jakob Mandlbauer (born 24 November 1998) is an Austrian bobsledder who competed at the 2026 Winter Olympics in the two-man and four-man bobsleigh events. He was placed 21st alongside Daiyehan Nichols-Bardi in the two-man and crashed in the four-man.
