= 2015–16 ISU World Standings =

Merit-based ice skating ranking

2015–16 ISU World Standings and Season's World Ranking
Season-end No. 1 skaters
- Men's singles: (Japan) Yuzuru Hanyu
- Ladies' singles: (Japan) Satoko Miyahara
- Pairs: (Canada) Meagan Duhamel / Eric Radford
- Ice dance: (United States) Madison Chock / Evan Bates

Season's No. 1 skaters
- Men's singles: (Japan) Yuzuru Hanyu
- Ladies' singles: (Russia) Evgenia Medvedeva
- Pairs: (Russia) Ksenia Stolbova / Fedor Klimov
- Ice dance: (United States) Madison Chock / Evan Bates

Season-end No. 1 teams
- Senior Synchronized: (Russia) Team Paradise
- Junior Synchronized: (Canada) Team Les Suprêmes Junior

Navigation

The 2015–16 ISU World Standings and Season's World Ranking, are the World Standings and Season's World Ranking published by the International Skating Union (ISU) during the 2015–16 season.

The 2015–16 ISU World Standings for single & pair skating and ice dance, are taking into account results of the 2013–14, 2014–15 and 2015–16 seasons.

The 2015–16 ISU World standings for synchronized skating, are based on the results of the 2013–14, 2014–15 and 2015–16 seasons.

== World Standings for single & pair skating and ice dance ==
=== Season-end standings ===
The remainder of this section is a complete list, by discipline, published by the ISU.

==== Men's singles (218 skaters) ====
As of 2 April 2016

Rank	Nation	Skater	Points	Season	ISU Championships or Olympics	(Junior) Grand Prix and Final		Selected International Competition	
Rank	Nation	Skater	Points	Season	Best	Best	2nd Best	Best	2nd Best
1	JPN	Yuzuru Hanyu	5145	2015/2016 season (100%)	1080	800	400	250	0
1	JPN	Yuzuru Hanyu	5145	2014/2015 season (100%)	1080	800	360	0	0
1	JPN	Yuzuru Hanyu	5145	2013/2014 season (70%)	840	560	252	175	0
2	ESP	Javier Fernandez	4640	2015/2016 season (100%)	1200	720	400	0	0
2	ESP	Javier Fernandez	4640	2014/2015 season (100%)	1200	720	400	0	0
2	ESP	Javier Fernandez	4640	2013/2014 season (70%)	680	227	183	0	0
3	KAZ	Denis Ten	3764	2015/2016 season (100%)	418	292	0	300	225
3	KAZ	Denis Ten	3764	2014/2015 season (100%)	972	324	292	300	0
3	KAZ	Denis Ten	3764	2013/2014 season (70%)	680	204	0	175	175
4	RUS	Sergei Voronov	3680	2015/2016 season (100%)	0	262	236	243	203
4	RUS	Sergei Voronov	3680	2014/2015 season (100%)	680	648	360	300	219
4	RUS	Sergei Voronov	3680	2013/2014 season (70%)	529	0	0	175	175
5	JPN	Shoma Uno	3460	2015/2016 season (100%)	638	648	400	198	0
5	JPN	Shoma Uno	3460	2014/2015 season (100%)	551	350	250	250	0
5	JPN	Shoma Uno	3460	2013/2014 season (70%)	230	142	127	175	0
6	RUS	Maxim Kovtun	3447	2015/2016 season (100%)	680	360	0	300	0
6	RUS	Maxim Kovtun	3447	2014/2015 season (100%)	756	583	400	0	0
6	RUS	Maxim Kovtun	3447	2013/2014 season (70%)	613	368	252	0	0
7	USA	Jason Brown	3438	2015/2016 season (100%)	0	324	0	300	270
7	USA	Jason Brown	3438	2014/2015 season (100%)	875	360	262	300	0
7	USA	Jason Brown	3438	2013/2014 season (70%)	362	227	183	158	0
8	CAN	Patrick Chan	3363	2015/2016 season (100%)	840	583	400	0	0
8	CAN	Patrick Chan	3363	2014/2015 season (100%)	0	0	0	0	0
8	CAN	Patrick Chan	3363	2013/2014 season (70%)	756	504	280	0	0
9	JPN	Takahito Mura	3359	2015/2016 season (100%)	551	324	0	203	0
9	JPN	Takahito Mura	3359	2014/2015 season (100%)	446	525	400	270	0
9	JPN	Takahito Mura	3359	2013/2014 season (70%)	588	165	0	175	158
10	USA	Adam Rippon	3191	2015/2016 season (100%)	709	292	292	270	270
10	USA	Adam Rippon	3191	2014/2015 season (100%)	574	262	0	270	0
10	USA	Adam Rippon	3191	2013/2014 season (70%)	281	252	204	0	0
11	USA	Max Aaron	3185	2015/2016 season (100%)	574	400	213	300	270
11	USA	Max Aaron	3185	2014/2015 season (100%)	0	324	213	300	0
11	USA	Max Aaron	3185	2013/2014 season (70%)	402	227	149	175	0
12	CZE	Michal Brezina	3012	2015/2016 season (100%)	517	213	191	225	225
12	CZE	Michal Brezina	3012	2014/2015 season (100%)	551	324	213	270	270
12	CZE	Michal Brezina	3012	2013/2014 season (70%)	428	204	183	0	0
13	CHN	Boyang Jin	2812	2015/2016 season (100%)	972	525	360	0	0
13	CHN	Boyang Jin	2812	2014/2015 season (100%)	450	255	250	0	0
13	CHN	Boyang Jin	2812	2013/2014 season (70%)	207	245	175	0	0
14	CAN	Nam Nguyen	2723	2015/2016 season (100%)	0	262	213	225	0
14	CAN	Nam Nguyen	2723	2014/2015 season (100%)	787	324	292	270	0
14	CAN	Nam Nguyen	2723	2013/2014 season (70%)	350	127	0	0	0
15	UZB	Misha Ge	2715	2015/2016 season (100%)	275	191	0	300	0
15	UZB	Misha Ge	2715	2014/2015 season (100%)	709	292	262	219	0
15	UZB	Misha Ge	2715	2013/2014 season (70%)	166	134	0	175	158
16	RUS	Alexander Petrov	2686	2015/2016 season (100%)	402	236	236	225	0
16	RUS	Alexander Petrov	2686	2014/2015 season (100%)	295	284	250	300	300
16	RUS	Alexander Petrov	2686	2013/2014 season (70%)	256	161	158	158	0
17	JPN	Daisuke Murakami	2634	2015/2016 season (100%)	0	472	324	0	0
17	JPN	Daisuke Murakami	2634	2014/2015 season (100%)	612	400	0	250	243
17	JPN	Daisuke Murakami	2634	2013/2014 season (70%)	0	0	0	175	158
18	CHN	Han Yan	2586	2015/2016 season (100%)	680	324	292	0	0
18	CHN	Han Yan	2586	2014/2015 season (100%)	680	236	191	0	0
18	CHN	Han Yan	2586	2013/2014 season (70%)	447	330	280	0	0
19	RUS	Konstantin Menshov	2564	2015/2016 season (100%)	0	262	236	300	250
19	RUS	Konstantin Menshov	2564	2014/2015 season (100%)	0	292	262	243	243
19	RUS	Konstantin Menshov	2564	2013/2014 season (70%)	476	204	134	158	0
20	ISR	Daniel Samohin	2563	2015/2016 season (100%)	500	230	225	300	270
20	ISR	Daniel Samohin	2563	2014/2015 season (100%)	325	120	0	225	219
20	ISR	Daniel Samohin	2563	2013/2014 season (70%)	110	142	127	0	0
21	RUS	Adian Pitkeev	2534	2015/2016 season (100%)	0	360	236	243	219
21	RUS	Adian Pitkeev	2534	2014/2015 season (100%)	446	236	236	243	0
21	RUS	Adian Pitkeev	2534	2013/2014 season (70%)	315	221	175	0	0
22	ISR	Alexei Bychenko	2439	2015/2016 season (100%)	756	0	0	250	160
22	ISR	Alexei Bychenko	2439	2014/2015 season (100%)	612	213	0	250	198
22	ISR	Alexei Bychenko	2439	2013/2014 season (70%)	228	0	0	127	115
23	RUS	Alexander Samarin	2332	2015/2016 season (100%)	365	250	182	300	219
23	RUS	Alexander Samarin	2332	2014/2015 season (100%)	174	225	203	270	144
23	RUS	Alexander Samarin	2332	2013/2014 season (70%)	0	127	0	0	0
24	RUS	Mikhail Kolyada	2274	2015/2016 season (100%)	875	262	0	270	250
24	RUS	Mikhail Kolyada	2274	2014/2015 season (100%)	0	0	0	0	0
24	RUS	Mikhail Kolyada	2274	2013/2014 season (70%)	0	158	142	175	142
25	JPN	Keiji Tanaka	2186	2015/2016 season (100%)	496	262	0	270	225
25	JPN	Keiji Tanaka	2186	2014/2015 season (100%)	0	191	0	203	0
25	JPN	Keiji Tanaka	2186	2013/2014 season (70%)	186	178	175	0	0
26	FRA	Florent Amodio	2058	2015/2016 season (100%)	612	0	0	219	0
26	FRA	Florent Amodio	2058	2014/2015 season (100%)	517	236	0	160	0
26	FRA	Florent Amodio	2058	2013/2014 season (70%)	166	165	149	0	0
27	PHI	Michael Christian Martinez	2002	2015/2016 season (100%)	362	236	0	250	219
27	PHI	Michael Christian Martinez	2002	2014/2015 season (100%)	146	0	0	270	250
27	PHI	Michael Christian Martinez	2002	2013/2014 season (70%)	126	142	127	127	0
28	ITA	Ivan Righini	1942	2015/2016 season (100%)	496	191	0	250	178
28	ITA	Ivan Righini	1942	2014/2015 season (100%)	402	0	0	250	160
28	ITA	Ivan Righini	1942	2013/2014 season (70%)	237	0	0	175	142
29	USA	Ross Miner	1935	2015/2016 season (100%)	214	324	213	243	0
29	USA	Ross Miner	1935	2014/2015 season (100%)	0	213	0	300	270
29	USA	Ross Miner	1935	2013/2014 season (70%)	0	0	0	158	127
30	USA	Richard Dornbush	1932	2015/2016 season (100%)	0	213	191	178	0
30	USA	Richard Dornbush	1932	2014/2015 season (100%)	0	324	213	300	0
30	USA	Richard Dornbush	1932	2013/2014 season (70%)	386	183	183	127	0
31	GER	Peter Liebers	1866	2015/2016 season (100%)	0	0	0	198	0
31	GER	Peter Liebers	1866	2014/2015 season (100%)	496	0	0	203	0
31	GER	Peter Liebers	1866	2013/2014 season (70%)	402	149	149	142	127
32	LAT	Deniss Vasiljevs	1826	2015/2016 season (100%)	305	225	225	243	198
32	LAT	Deniss Vasiljevs	1826	2014/2015 season (100%)	266	182	182	0	0
32	LAT	Deniss Vasiljevs	1826	2013/2014 season (70%)	167	93	68	0	0
33	USA	Grant Hochstein	1774	2015/2016 season (100%)	465	292	292	160	0
33	USA	Grant Hochstein	1774	2014/2015 season (100%)	0	0	0	219	219
33	USA	Grant Hochstein	1774	2013/2014 season (70%)	0	0	0	127	0
34	SWE	Alexander Majorov	1744	2015/2016 season (100%)	293	0	0	250	225
34	SWE	Alexander Majorov	1744	2014/2015 season (100%)	293	0	0	225	0
34	SWE	Alexander Majorov	1744	2013/2014 season (70%)	213	149	134	175	175
35	RUS	Dmitri Aliev	1739	2015/2016 season (100%)	295	315	250	270	203
35	RUS	Dmitri Aliev	1739	2014/2015 season (100%)	0	203	203	0	0
35	RUS	Dmitri Aliev	1739	2013/2014 season (70%)	0	0	0	0	0
36	JPN	Takahiko Kozuka	1725	2015/2016 season (100%)	0	0	0	0	0
36	JPN	Takahiko Kozuka	1725	2014/2015 season (100%)	377	236	191	0	0
36	JPN	Takahiko Kozuka	1725	2013/2014 season (70%)	529	227	165	0	0
37	USA	Nathan Chen	1673	2015/2016 season (100%)	0	350	250	0	0
37	USA	Nathan Chen	1673	2014/2015 season (100%)	365	225	0	0	0
37	USA	Nathan Chen	1673	2013/2014 season (70%)	284	199	175	0	0
38	FRA	Chafik Besseghier	1658	2015/2016 season (100%)	162	0	0	250	250
38	FRA	Chafik Besseghier	1658	2014/2015 season (100%)	200	213	0	225	0
38	FRA	Chafik Besseghier	1658	2013/2014 season (70%)	362	0	0	158	142
39	KOR	June Hyoung Lee	1599	2015/2016 season (100%)	173	0	0	0	0
39	KOR	June Hyoung Lee	1599	2014/2015 season (100%)	180	250	207	225	203
39	KOR	June Hyoung Lee	1599	2013/2014 season (70%)	150	115	104	142	0
40	ITA	Matteo Rizzo	1489	2015/2016 season (100%)	237	164	164	243	225
40	ITA	Matteo Rizzo	1489	2014/2015 season (100%)	55	0	0	243	0
40	ITA	Matteo Rizzo	1489	2013/2014 season (70%)	0	0	0	158	115
41	JPN	Sota Yamamoto	1479	2015/2016 season (100%)	0	284	250	0	0
41	JPN	Sota Yamamoto	1479	2014/2015 season (100%)	405	315	225	0	0
41	JPN	Sota Yamamoto	1479	2013/2014 season (70%)	0	0	0	0	0
42	USA	Jeremy Abbott	1467	2015/2016 season (100%)	0	0	0	0	0
42	USA	Jeremy Abbott	1467	2014/2015 season (100%)	0	262	262	0	0
42	USA	Jeremy Abbott	1467	2013/2014 season (70%)	551	227	165	0	0
43	USA	Joshua Farris	1428	2015/2016 season (100%)	0	0	0	0	0
43	USA	Joshua Farris	1428	2014/2015 season (100%)	756	0	0	0	0
43	USA	Joshua Farris	1428	2013/2014 season (70%)	347	183	0	142	0
44	BEL	Jorik Hendrickx	1415	2015/2016 season (100%)	362	0	0	250	250
44	BEL	Jorik Hendrickx	1415	2014/2015 season (100%)	0	0	0	0	0
44	BEL	Jorik Hendrickx	1415	2013/2014 season (70%)	253	0	0	158	142
45	GER	Franz Streubel	1370	2015/2016 season (100%)	214	0	0	225	219
45	GER	Franz Streubel	1370	2014/2015 season (100%)	237	0	0	250	225
45	GER	Franz Streubel	1370	2013/2014 season (70%)	134	0	0	158	115
46	AUS	Brendan Kerry	1347	2015/2016 season (100%)	222	191	0	203	0
46	AUS	Brendan Kerry	1347	2014/2015 season (100%)	162	0	0	164	0
46	AUS	Brendan Kerry	1347	2013/2014 season (70%)	79	115	115	175	0
47	UKR	Ivan Pavlov	1338	2015/2016 season (100%)	192	203	120	198	0
47	UKR	Ivan Pavlov	1338	2014/2015 season (100%)	103	164	133	225	0
47	UKR	Ivan Pavlov	1338	2013/2014 season (70%)	80	93	84	0	0
48	KOR	Jin Seo Kim	1243	2015/2016 season (100%)	325	0	0	0	0
48	KOR	Jin Seo Kim	1243	2014/2015 season (100%)	215	0	0	270	225
48	KOR	Jin Seo Kim	1243	2013/2014 season (70%)	173	104	104	0	0
49	CAN	Elladj Balde	1215	2015/2016 season (100%)	0	0	0	300	0
49	CAN	Elladj Balde	1215	2014/2015 season (100%)	0	236	0	198	0
49	CAN	Elladj Balde	1215	2013/2014 season (70%)	205	149	0	127	0
50	CZE	Petr Coufal	1184	2015/2016 season (100%)	0	0	0	0	0
50	CZE	Petr Coufal	1184	2014/2015 season (100%)	264	0	0	219	203
50	CZE	Petr Coufal	1184	2013/2014 season (70%)	136	93	0	142	127
51	CAN	Roman Sadovsky	1163	2015/2016 season (100%)	0	250	207	0	0
51	CAN	Roman Sadovsky	1163	2014/2015 season (100%)	127	250	230	0	0
51	CAN	Roman Sadovsky	1163	2013/2014 season (70%)	99	84	0	0	0
52	MAS	Julian Zhi Jie Yee	1159	2015/2016 season (100%)	192	182	133	270	0
52	MAS	Julian Zhi Jie Yee	1159	2014/2015 season (100%)	92	148	0	0	0
52	MAS	Julian Zhi Jie Yee	1159	2013/2014 season (70%)	58	0	0	142	0
53	CHN	He Zhang	1148	2015/2016 season (100%)	194	203	182	0	0
53	CHN	He Zhang	1148	2014/2015 season (100%)	141	225	203	0	0
53	CHN	He Zhang	1148	2013/2014 season (70%)	122	158	142	0	0
54	RUS	Moris Kvitelashvili	1106	2015/2016 season (100%)	0	0	0	243	198
54	RUS	Moris Kvitelashvili	1106	2014/2015 season (100%)	0	0	0	198	198
54	RUS	Moris Kvitelashvili	1106	2013/2014 season (70%)	0	142	127	0	0
55	CAN	Nicolas Nadeau	1100	2015/2016 season (100%)	450	225	164	0	0
55	CAN	Nicolas Nadeau	1100	2014/2015 season (100%)	0	164	97	0	0
55	CAN	Nicolas Nadeau	1100	2013/2014 season (70%)	0	0	0	0	0
56	GBR	Phillip Harris	1072	2015/2016 season (100%)	140	0	0	182	178
56	GBR	Phillip Harris	1072	2014/2015 season (100%)	192	0	0	198	182
56	GBR	Phillip Harris	1072	2013/2014 season (70%)	0	0	0	0	0
57	JPN	Ryuju Hino	1058	2015/2016 season (100%)	0	0	0	203	178
57	JPN	Ryuju Hino	1058	2014/2015 season (100%)	0	0	0	203	0
57	JPN	Ryuju Hino	1058	2013/2014 season (70%)	0	158	158	158	0
58	RUS	Andrei Lazukin	1041	2015/2016 season (100%)	0	108	0	0	0
58	RUS	Andrei Lazukin	1041	2014/2015 season (100%)	0	250	120	250	198
58	RUS	Andrei Lazukin	1041	2013/2014 season (70%)	0	115	0	0	0
59	CHN	Nan Song	1039	2015/2016 season (100%)	264	0	0	0	0
59	CHN	Nan Song	1039	2014/2015 season (100%)	0	0	0	0	0
59	CHN	Nan Song	1039	2013/2014 season (70%)	476	165	134	0	0
60	BLR	Pavel Ignatenko	1025	2015/2016 season (100%)	0	0	0	178	178
60	BLR	Pavel Ignatenko	1025	2014/2015 season (100%)	102	0	0	178	0
60	BLR	Pavel Ignatenko	1025	2013/2014 season (70%)	79	84	84	142	127
61	TPE	Chih-I Tsao	1024	2015/2016 season (100%)	102	0	0	182	0
61	TPE	Chih-I Tsao	1024	2014/2015 season (100%)	126	120	0	182	0
61	TPE	Chih-I Tsao	1024	2013/2014 season (70%)	98	104	93	115	0
62	RUS	Artur Dmitriev	1018	2015/2016 season (100%)	0	0	0	300	250
62	RUS	Artur Dmitriev	1018	2014/2015 season (100%)	0	0	0	243	225
62	RUS	Artur Dmitriev	1018	2013/2014 season (70%)	0	0	0	127	0
63	CAN	Kevin Reynolds	1014	2015/2016 season (100%)	293	0	0	250	0
63	CAN	Kevin Reynolds	1014	2014/2015 season (100%)	0	0	0	178	0
63	CAN	Kevin Reynolds	1014	2013/2014 season (70%)	293	0	0	0	0
64	ARG	Denis Margalik	994	2015/2016 season (100%)	156	203	120	0	0
64	ARG	Denis Margalik	994	2014/2015 season (100%)	173	182	0	160	0
64	ARG	Denis Margalik	994	2013/2014 season (70%)	0	0	0	0	0
65	FRA	Kevin Aymoz	985	2015/2016 season (100%)	215	182	0	203	160
65	FRA	Kevin Aymoz	985	2014/2015 season (100%)	0	0	0	225	0
65	FRA	Kevin Aymoz	985	2013/2014 season (70%)	0	0	0	0	0
66	JPN	Daisuke Takahashi	980	2015/2016 season (100%)	0	0	0	0	0
66	JPN	Daisuke Takahashi	980	2014/2015 season (100%)	0	0	0	0	0
66	JPN	Daisuke Takahashi	980	2013/2014 season (70%)	496	280	204	0	0
67	RUS	Gordei Gorshkov	975	2015/2016 season (100%)	0	0	0	243	219
67	RUS	Gordei Gorshkov	975	2014/2015 season (100%)	0	0	0	270	243
67	RUS	Gordei Gorshkov	975	2013/2014 season (70%)	0	0	0	142	0
68	FIN	Valtter Virtanen	949	2015/2016 season (100%)	0	0	0	225	203
68	FIN	Valtter Virtanen	949	2014/2015 season (100%)	140	0	0	203	178
68	FIN	Valtter Virtanen	949	2013/2014 season (70%)	0	0	0	142	0
69	SUI	Stephane Walker	922	2015/2016 season (100%)	126	0	0	203	182
69	SUI	Stephane Walker	922	2014/2015 season (100%)	0	0	0	0	0
69	SUI	Stephane Walker	922	2013/2014 season (70%)	109	0	0	175	127
70	UKR	Yaroslav Paniot	876	2015/2016 season (100%)	174	182	0	144	0
70	UKR	Yaroslav Paniot	876	2014/2015 season (100%)	173	203	0	0	0
70	UKR	Yaroslav Paniot	876	2013/2014 season (70%)	0	0	0	0	0
71	USA	Timothy Dolensky	870	2015/2016 season (100%)	0	213	0	219	219
71	USA	Timothy Dolensky	870	2014/2015 season (100%)	0	0	0	219	0
71	USA	Timothy Dolensky	870	2013/2014 season (70%)	0	0	0	0	0
72	CAN	Liam Firus	861	2015/2016 season (100%)	237	0	0	250	160
72	CAN	Liam Firus	861	2014/2015 season (100%)	214	0	0	0	0
72	CAN	Liam Firus	861	2013/2014 season (70%)	0	0	0	0	0
73	GER	Paul Fentz	828	2015/2016 season (100%)	173	0	0	0	0
73	GER	Paul Fentz	828	2014/2015 season (100%)	0	0	0	219	182
73	GER	Paul Fentz	828	2013/2014 season (70%)	0	0	0	127	127
74	USA	Vincent Zhou	808	2015/2016 season (100%)	328	255	225	0	0
74	USA	Vincent Zhou	808	2014/2015 season (100%)	0	0	0	0	0
74	USA	Vincent Zhou	808	2013/2014 season (70%)	0	0	0	0	0
75	RUS	Artur Gachinski	790	2015/2016 season (100%)	0	0	0	0	0
75	RUS	Artur Gachinski	790	2014/2015 season (100%)	0	191	0	0	0
75	RUS	Artur Gachinski	790	2013/2014 season (70%)	0	165	134	158	142
76	NOR	Sondre Oddvoll Bøe	783	2015/2016 season (100%)	74	97	97	164	144
76	NOR	Sondre Oddvoll Bøe	783	2014/2015 season (100%)	92	0	0	0	0
76	NOR	Sondre Oddvoll Bøe	783	2013/2014 season (70%)	31	0	0	115	0
77	ITA	Maurizio Zandron	780	2015/2016 season (100%)	0	0	0	225	225
77	ITA	Maurizio Zandron	780	2014/2015 season (100%)	0	0	0	203	0
77	ITA	Maurizio Zandron	780	2013/2014 season (70%)	0	0	0	127	115
78	USA	Tomoki Hiwatashi	772	2015/2016 season (100%)	405	203	164	0	0
78	USA	Tomoki Hiwatashi	772	2014/2015 season (100%)	0	0	0	0	0
78	USA	Tomoki Hiwatashi	772	2013/2014 season (70%)	0	0	0	0	0
79	DEN	Justus Strid	766	2015/2016 season (100%)	0	0	0	0	0
79	DEN	Justus Strid	766	2014/2015 season (100%)	126	0	0	164	160
79	DEN	Justus Strid	766	2013/2014 season (70%)	0	0	0	158	158
80	ESP	Felipe Montoya	752	2015/2016 season (100%)	156	0	0	250	182
80	ESP	Felipe Montoya	752	2014/2015 season (100%)	0	0	0	164	0
80	ESP	Felipe Montoya	752	2013/2014 season (70%)	0	0	0	0	0
81	USA	Stephen Carriere	750	2015/2016 season (100%)	0	0	0	0	0
81	USA	Stephen Carriere	750	2014/2015 season (100%)	0	292	0	300	0
81	USA	Stephen Carriere	750	2013/2014 season (70%)	0	0	0	158	0
82	ARM	Slavik Hayrapetyan	747	2015/2016 season (100%)	0	0	0	225	160
82	ARM	Slavik Hayrapetyan	747	2014/2015 season (100%)	44	0	0	203	0
82	ARM	Slavik Hayrapetyan	747	2013/2014 season (70%)	0	0	0	115	0
83	GBR	Graham Newberry	722	2015/2016 season (100%)	0	0	0	0	0
83	GBR	Graham Newberry	722	2014/2015 season (100%)	61	148	133	144	0
83	GBR	Graham Newberry	722	2013/2014 season (70%)	53	115	68	0	0
84	HKG	Ronald Lam	701	2015/2016 season (100%)	0	0	0	0	0
84	HKG	Ronald Lam	701	2014/2015 season (100%)	305	0	0	198	198
84	HKG	Ronald Lam	701	2013/2014 season (70%)	0	0	0	0	0
84	ESP	Javier Raya	701	2015/2016 season (100%)	0	0	0	0	0
84	ESP	Javier Raya	701	2014/2015 season (100%)	214	0	0	225	164
84	ESP	Javier Raya	701	2013/2014 season (70%)	98	0	0	0	0
86	USA	Alexander Johnson	682	2015/2016 season (100%)	0	0	0	182	178
86	USA	Alexander Johnson	682	2014/2015 season (100%)	0	0	0	178	144
86	USA	Alexander Johnson	682	2013/2014 season (70%)	0	0	0	0	0
87	CHN	Yi Wang	674	2015/2016 season (100%)	0	191	0	0	0
87	CHN	Yi Wang	674	2014/2015 season (100%)	362	0	0	0	0
87	CHN	Yi Wang	674	2013/2014 season (70%)	121	0	0	0	0
88	FIN	Matthias Versluis	672	2015/2016 season (100%)	0	0	0	250	182
88	FIN	Matthias Versluis	672	2014/2015 season (100%)	0	0	0	164	0
88	FIN	Matthias Versluis	672	2013/2014 season (70%)	0	76	0	0	0
89	GER	Alexander Bjelde	654	2015/2016 season (100%)	0	0	0	203	0
89	GER	Alexander Bjelde	654	2014/2015 season (100%)	0	0	0	203	164
89	GER	Alexander Bjelde	654	2013/2014 season (70%)	0	84	0	0	0
90	USA	Jordan Moeller	651	2015/2016 season (100%)	0	0	0	160	0
90	USA	Jordan Moeller	651	2014/2015 season (100%)	0	0	0	160	0
90	USA	Jordan Moeller	651	2013/2014 season (70%)	151	104	76	0	0
91	GER	Martin Rappe	621	2015/2016 season (100%)	0	0	0	203	0
91	GER	Martin Rappe	621	2014/2015 season (100%)	0	0	0	243	0
91	GER	Martin Rappe	621	2013/2014 season (70%)	0	0	0	175	0
92	SLO	David Kranjec	592	2015/2016 season (100%)	92	0	0	203	0
92	SLO	David Kranjec	592	2014/2015 season (100%)	0	0	0	0	0
92	SLO	David Kranjec	592	2013/2014 season (70%)	71	68	0	158	0
93	RUS	Daniil Bernadiner	580	2015/2016 season (100%)	0	164	148	0	0
93	RUS	Daniil Bernadiner	580	2014/2015 season (100%)	0	148	120	0	0
93	RUS	Daniil Bernadiner	580	2013/2014 season (70%)	0	0	0	0	0
94	KAZ	Abzal Rakimgaliev	567	2015/2016 season (100%)	0	0	0	178	0
94	KAZ	Abzal Rakimgaliev	567	2014/2015 season (100%)	113	0	0	0	0
94	KAZ	Abzal Rakimgaliev	567	2013/2014 season (70%)	134	0	0	142	0
95	RUS	Zhan Bush	543	2015/2016 season (100%)	0	0	0	243	0
95	RUS	Zhan Bush	543	2014/2015 season (100%)	0	0	0	0	0
95	RUS	Zhan Bush	543	2013/2014 season (70%)	0	0	0	158	142
96	JPN	Shu Nakamura	542	2015/2016 season (100%)	157	97	0	0	0
96	JPN	Shu Nakamura	542	2014/2015 season (100%)	0	97	0	0	0
96	JPN	Shu Nakamura	542	2013/2014 season (70%)	0	115	76	0	0
97	USA	Andrew Torgashev	540	2015/2016 season (100%)	0	0	0	0	0
97	USA	Andrew Torgashev	540	2014/2015 season (100%)	194	182	164	0	0
97	USA	Andrew Torgashev	540	2013/2014 season (70%)	0	0	0	0	0
97	GER	Niko Ulanovsky	540	2015/2016 season (100%)	0	120	97	0	0
97	GER	Niko Ulanovsky	540	2014/2015 season (100%)	93	133	97	0	0
97	GER	Niko Ulanovsky	540	2013/2014 season (70%)	0	68	0	0	0
99	JPN	Sei Kawahara	536	2015/2016 season (100%)	0	0	0	0	0
99	JPN	Sei Kawahara	536	2014/2015 season (100%)	0	203	164	0	0
99	JPN	Sei Kawahara	536	2013/2014 season (70%)	0	93	76	0	0
100	GBR	Peter James Hallam	500	2015/2016 season (100%)	0	0	0	225	0
100	GBR	Peter James Hallam	500	2014/2015 season (100%)	0	0	0	182	0
100	GBR	Peter James Hallam	500	2013/2014 season (70%)	0	93	0	0	0
101	GBR	Charlie Parry-Evans	494	2015/2016 season (100%)	0	0	0	203	164
101	GBR	Charlie Parry-Evans	494	2014/2015 season (100%)	0	0	0	0	0
101	GBR	Charlie Parry-Evans	494	2013/2014 season (70%)	0	0	0	127	0
102	CZE	Petr Kotlarik	489	2015/2016 season (100%)	0	108	97	164	0
102	CZE	Petr Kotlarik	489	2014/2015 season (100%)	0	120	0	0	0
102	CZE	Petr Kotlarik	489	2013/2014 season (70%)	0	0	0	0	0
102	AZE	Larry Loupolover	489	2015/2016 season (100%)	0	0	0	203	203
102	AZE	Larry Loupolover	489	2014/2015 season (100%)	83	0	0	0	0
102	AZE	Larry Loupolover	489	2013/2014 season (70%)	0	0	0	0	0
104	FRA	Simon Hocquaux	485	2015/2016 season (100%)	0	0	0	0	0
104	FRA	Simon Hocquaux	485	2014/2015 season (100%)	0	164	164	0	0
104	FRA	Simon Hocquaux	485	2013/2014 season (70%)	89	68	0	0	0
105	JPN	Hidetsugu Kamata	479	2015/2016 season (100%)	0	133	0	0	0
105	JPN	Hidetsugu Kamata	479	2014/2015 season (100%)	0	164	0	182	0
105	JPN	Hidetsugu Kamata	479	2013/2014 season (70%)	0	0	0	0	0
106	FIN	Roman Galay	476	2015/2016 season (100%)	0	148	0	164	164
106	FIN	Roman Galay	476	2014/2015 season (100%)	0	0	0	0	0
106	FIN	Roman Galay	476	2013/2014 season (70%)	0	0	0	0	0
107	RUS	Anton Shulepov	468	2015/2016 season (100%)	0	0	0	270	198
107	RUS	Anton Shulepov	468	2014/2015 season (100%)	0	0	0	0	0
107	RUS	Anton Shulepov	468	2013/2014 season (70%)	0	0	0	0	0
108	PHI	Christopher Caluza	458	2015/2016 season (100%)	0	0	0	0	0
108	PHI	Christopher Caluza	458	2014/2015 season (100%)	0	0	0	0	0
108	PHI	Christopher Caluza	458	2013/2014 season (70%)	185	0	0	158	115
109	FIN	Viktor Zubik	453	2015/2016 season (100%)	0	0	0	0	0
109	FIN	Viktor Zubik	453	2014/2015 season (100%)	0	0	0	182	144
109	FIN	Viktor Zubik	453	2013/2014 season (70%)	0	0	0	127	0
110	SUI	Nicola Todeschini	450	2015/2016 season (100%)	55	0	0	182	164
110	SUI	Nicola Todeschini	450	2014/2015 season (100%)	49	0	0	0	0
110	SUI	Nicola Todeschini	450	2013/2014 season (70%)	0	0	0	0	0
111	RUS	Sergei Borodulin	447	2015/2016 season (100%)	0	0	0	0	0
111	RUS	Sergei Borodulin	447	2014/2015 season (100%)	0	0	0	178	0
111	RUS	Sergei Borodulin	447	2013/2014 season (70%)	0	0	0	142	127
112	USA	Shotaro Omori	445	2015/2016 season (100%)	0	0	0	0	0
112	USA	Shotaro Omori	445	2014/2015 season (100%)	0	182	148	0	0
112	USA	Shotaro Omori	445	2013/2014 season (70%)	0	115	0	0	0
113	KOR	Se Jong Byun	439	2015/2016 season (100%)	140	108	0	0	0
113	KOR	Se Jong Byun	439	2014/2015 season (100%)	83	108	0	0	0
113	KOR	Se Jong Byun	439	2013/2014 season (70%)	0	0	0	0	0
114	JPN	Hiroaki Sato	437	2015/2016 season (100%)	0	0	0	203	0
114	JPN	Hiroaki Sato	437	2014/2015 season (100%)	114	120	0	0	0
114	JPN	Hiroaki Sato	437	2013/2014 season (70%)	0	0	0	0	0
115	POL	Patrick Myzyk	435	2015/2016 season (100%)	0	0	0	0	0
115	POL	Patrick Myzyk	435	2014/2015 season (100%)	113	0	0	178	144
115	POL	Patrick Myzyk	435	2013/2014 season (70%)	0	0	0	0	0
116	FRA	Romain Ponsart	414	2015/2016 season (100%)	0	0	0	164	0
116	FRA	Romain Ponsart	414	2014/2015 season (100%)	0	0	0	250	0
116	FRA	Romain Ponsart	414	2013/2014 season (70%)	0	0	0	0	0
117	USA	Tony Lu	389	2015/2016 season (100%)	0	148	133	0	0
117	USA	Tony Lu	389	2014/2015 season (100%)	0	108	0	0	0
117	USA	Tony Lu	389	2013/2014 season (70%)	0	0	0	0	0
118	ITA	Dario Betti	380	2015/2016 season (100%)	0	0	0	198	182
118	ITA	Dario Betti	380	2014/2015 season (100%)	0	0	0	0	0
118	ITA	Dario Betti	380	2013/2014 season (70%)	0	0	0	0	0
119	JPN	Daichi Miyata	379	2015/2016 season (100%)	83	148	148	0	0
119	JPN	Daichi Miyata	379	2014/2015 season (100%)	0	0	0	0	0
119	JPN	Daichi Miyata	379	2013/2014 season (70%)	0	0	0	0	0
120	USA	Alexei Krasnozhon	367	2015/2016 season (100%)	0	203	164	0	0
120	USA	Alexei Krasnozhon	367	2014/2015 season (100%)	0	0	0	0	0
120	USA	Alexei Krasnozhon	367	2013/2014 season (70%)	0	0	0	0	0
121	RUS	Artem Lezheev	361	2015/2016 season (100%)	0	0	0	219	0
121	RUS	Artem Lezheev	361	2014/2015 season (100%)	0	0	0	0	0
121	RUS	Artem Lezheev	361	2013/2014 season (70%)	0	0	0	142	0
122	FRA	Adrien Tesson	351	2015/2016 season (100%)	0	0	0	0	0
122	FRA	Adrien Tesson	351	2014/2015 season (100%)	0	148	0	203	0
122	FRA	Adrien Tesson	351	2013/2014 season (70%)	0	0	0	0	0
123	ITA	Marco Zandron	346	2015/2016 season (100%)	0	0	0	182	0
123	ITA	Marco Zandron	346	2014/2015 season (100%)	0	0	0	164	0
123	ITA	Marco Zandron	346	2013/2014 season (70%)	0	0	0	0	0
124	POL	Krzysztof Gala	342	2015/2016 season (100%)	0	0	0	182	160
124	POL	Krzysztof Gala	342	2014/2015 season (100%)	0	0	0	0	0
124	POL	Krzysztof Gala	342	2013/2014 season (70%)	0	0	0	0	0
125	RUS	Petr Gumennik	330	2015/2016 season (100%)	0	182	148	0	0
125	RUS	Petr Gumennik	330	2014/2015 season (100%)	0	0	0	0	0
125	RUS	Petr Gumennik	330	2013/2014 season (70%)	0	0	0	0	0
126	RUS	Murad Kurbanov	324	2015/2016 season (100%)	0	0	0	0	0
126	RUS	Murad Kurbanov	324	2014/2015 season (100%)	0	182	0	0	0
126	RUS	Murad Kurbanov	324	2013/2014 season (70%)	0	142	0	0	0
127	CZE	Jiri Belohradsky	316	2015/2016 season (100%)	113	0	0	203	0
127	CZE	Jiri Belohradsky	316	2014/2015 season (100%)	0	0	0	0	0
127	CZE	Jiri Belohradsky	316	2013/2014 season (70%)	0	0	0	0	0
128	CHN	Jinlin Guan	312	2015/2016 season (100%)	0	0	0	0	0
128	CHN	Jinlin Guan	312	2014/2015 season (100%)	0	0	0	0	0
128	CHN	Jinlin Guan	312	2013/2014 season (70%)	312	0	0	0	0
128	CAN	Andrei Rogozine	312	2015/2016 season (100%)	0	0	0	0	0
128	CAN	Andrei Rogozine	312	2014/2015 season (100%)	0	0	0	178	0
128	CAN	Andrei Rogozine	312	2013/2014 season (70%)	0	134	0	0	0
130	USA	Kevin Shum	309	2015/2016 season (100%)	0	108	0	0	0
130	USA	Kevin Shum	309	2014/2015 season (100%)	68	133	0	0	0
130	USA	Kevin Shum	309	2013/2014 season (70%)	0	0	0	0	0
130	JPN	Yoji Tsuboi	309	2015/2016 season (100%)	0	0	0	0	0
130	JPN	Yoji Tsuboi	309	2014/2015 season (100%)	0	0	0	182	0
130	JPN	Yoji Tsuboi	309	2013/2014 season (70%)	0	0	0	127	0
132	AUT	Mario-Rafael Ionian	308	2015/2016 season (100%)	83	0	0	225	0
132	AUT	Mario-Rafael Ionian	308	2014/2015 season (100%)	0	0	0	0	0
132	AUT	Mario-Rafael Ionian	308	2013/2014 season (70%)	0	0	0	0	0
133	JPN	Koshiro Shimada	297	2015/2016 season (100%)	0	164	133	0	0
133	JPN	Koshiro Shimada	297	2014/2015 season (100%)	0	0	0	0	0
133	JPN	Koshiro Shimada	297	2013/2014 season (70%)	0	0	0	0	0
134	RUS	Vladimir Samoilov	296	2015/2016 season (100%)	0	148	0	0	0
134	RUS	Vladimir Samoilov	296	2014/2015 season (100%)	0	148	0	0	0
134	RUS	Vladimir Samoilov	296	2013/2014 season (70%)	0	0	0	0	0
134	CHN	Wenbo Zang	296	2015/2016 season (100%)	0	0	0	0	0
134	CHN	Wenbo Zang	296	2014/2015 season (100%)	0	0	0	0	0
134	CHN	Wenbo Zang	296	2013/2014 season (70%)	65	127	104	0	0
136	CHN	Tangxu Li	290	2015/2016 season (100%)	0	182	0	0	0
136	CHN	Tangxu Li	290	2014/2015 season (100%)	0	108	0	0	0
136	CHN	Tangxu Li	290	2013/2014 season (70%)	0	0	0	0	0
137	CAN	Anthony Kan	281	2015/2016 season (100%)	0	0	0	0	0
137	CAN	Anthony Kan	281	2014/2015 season (100%)	0	148	133	0	0
137	CAN	Anthony Kan	281	2013/2014 season (70%)	0	0	0	0	0
138	CAN	Bennet Toman	279	2015/2016 season (100%)	0	0	0	182	0
138	CAN	Bennet Toman	279	2014/2015 season (100%)	0	97	0	0	0
138	CAN	Bennet Toman	279	2013/2014 season (70%)	0	0	0	0	0
139	KOR	Jun Hwan Cha	266	2015/2016 season (100%)	266	0	0	0	0
139	KOR	Jun Hwan Cha	266	2014/2015 season (100%)	0	0	0	0	0
139	KOR	Jun Hwan Cha	266	2013/2014 season (70%)	0	0	0	0	0
140	AUS	Andrew Dodds	257	2015/2016 season (100%)	113	0	0	144	0
140	AUS	Andrew Dodds	257	2014/2015 season (100%)	0	0	0	0	0
140	AUS	Andrew Dodds	257	2013/2014 season (70%)	0	0	0	0	0
140	FRA	Antoine Pierre	257	2015/2016 season (100%)	0	0	0	0	0
140	FRA	Antoine Pierre	257	2014/2015 season (100%)	0	0	0	0	0
140	FRA	Antoine Pierre	257	2013/2014 season (70%)	0	0	0	142	115
142	GER	Panagiotis Polizoakis	248	2015/2016 season (100%)	0	0	0	0	0
142	GER	Panagiotis Polizoakis	248	2014/2015 season (100%)	0	0	0	144	0
142	GER	Panagiotis Polizoakis	248	2013/2014 season (70%)	0	104	0	0	0
143	CAN	Mitchell Gordon	230	2015/2016 season (100%)	0	0	0	0	0
143	CAN	Mitchell Gordon	230	2014/2015 season (100%)	0	133	97	0	0
143	CAN	Mitchell Gordon	230	2013/2014 season (70%)	0	0	0	0	0
143	RUS	Vladislav Sesganov	230	2015/2016 season (100%)	0	0	0	0	0
143	RUS	Vladislav Sesganov	230	2014/2015 season (100%)	0	0	0	0	0
143	RUS	Vladislav Sesganov	230	2013/2014 season (70%)	0	0	0	115	115
145	KOR	Si Hyeong Lee	228	2015/2016 season (100%)	0	120	108	0	0
145	KOR	Si Hyeong Lee	228	2014/2015 season (100%)	0	0	0	0	0
145	KOR	Si Hyeong Lee	228	2013/2014 season (70%)	0	0	0	0	0
146	CRO	Nicholas Vrdoljak	222	2015/2016 season (100%)	102	120	0	0	0
146	CRO	Nicholas Vrdoljak	222	2014/2015 season (100%)	0	0	0	0	0
146	CRO	Nicholas Vrdoljak	222	2013/2014 season (70%)	0	0	0	0	0
147	HUN	Kristof Forgo	219	2015/2016 season (100%)	0	0	0	0	0
147	HUN	Kristof Forgo	219	2014/2015 season (100%)	0	0	0	219	0
147	HUN	Kristof Forgo	219	2013/2014 season (70%)	0	0	0	0	0
148	FRA	Daniel Albert Naurits	217	2015/2016 season (100%)	0	0	0	0	0
148	FRA	Daniel Albert Naurits	217	2014/2015 season (100%)	0	120	97	0	0
148	FRA	Daniel Albert Naurits	217	2013/2014 season (70%)	0	0	0	0	0
149	BLR	Yakau Zenko	213	2015/2016 season (100%)	93	120	0	0	0
149	BLR	Yakau Zenko	213	2014/2015 season (100%)	0	0	0	0	0
149	BLR	Yakau Zenko	213	2013/2014 season (70%)	0	0	0	0	0
150	KOR	Dong Won Lee	203	2015/2016 season (100%)	0	0	0	0	0
150	KOR	Dong Won Lee	203	2014/2015 season (100%)	0	0	0	0	0
150	KOR	Dong Won Lee	203	2013/2014 season (70%)	88	0	0	115	0
150	USA	Sean Rabbitt	203	2015/2016 season (100%)	0	0	0	203	0
150	USA	Sean Rabbitt	203	2014/2015 season (100%)	0	0	0	0	0
150	USA	Sean Rabbitt	203	2013/2014 season (70%)	0	0	0	0	0
152	CAN	Keegan Messing	198	2015/2016 season (100%)	0	0	0	198	0
152	CAN	Keegan Messing	198	2014/2015 season (100%)	0	0	0	0	0
152	CAN	Keegan Messing	198	2013/2014 season (70%)	0	0	0	0	0
152	GBR	Jack Newberry	198	2015/2016 season (100%)	0	0	0	0	0
152	GBR	Jack Newberry	198	2014/2015 season (100%)	0	0	0	198	0
152	GBR	Jack Newberry	198	2013/2014 season (70%)	0	0	0	0	0
152	RUS	Evgeni Vlasov	198	2015/2016 season (100%)	0	0	0	0	0
152	RUS	Evgeni Vlasov	198	2014/2015 season (100%)	0	0	0	198	0
152	RUS	Evgeni Vlasov	198	2013/2014 season (70%)	0	0	0	0	0
155	GEO	Armen Agaian	182	2015/2016 season (100%)	0	0	0	0	0
155	GEO	Armen Agaian	182	2014/2015 season (100%)	0	0	0	182	0
155	GEO	Armen Agaian	182	2013/2014 season (70%)	0	0	0	0	0
155	SUI	Vincent Cuerel	182	2015/2016 season (100%)	0	0	0	182	0
155	SUI	Vincent Cuerel	182	2014/2015 season (100%)	0	0	0	0	0
155	SUI	Vincent Cuerel	182	2013/2014 season (70%)	0	0	0	0	0
155	BLR	Alexei Mialionkhin	182	2015/2016 season (100%)	0	0	0	182	0
155	BLR	Alexei Mialionkhin	182	2014/2015 season (100%)	0	0	0	0	0
155	BLR	Alexei Mialionkhin	182	2013/2014 season (70%)	0	0	0	0	0
155	FIN	Tomi Pulkkinen	182	2015/2016 season (100%)	0	0	0	182	0
155	FIN	Tomi Pulkkinen	182	2014/2015 season (100%)	0	0	0	0	0
155	FIN	Tomi Pulkkinen	182	2013/2014 season (70%)	0	0	0	0	0
159	SVK	Marco Klepoch	178	2015/2016 season (100%)	0	0	0	0	0
159	SVK	Marco Klepoch	178	2014/2015 season (100%)	0	0	0	178	0
159	SVK	Marco Klepoch	178	2013/2014 season (70%)	0	0	0	0	0
160	RUS	Evgeni Plushenko	175	2015/2016 season (100%)	0	0	0	0	0
160	RUS	Evgeni Plushenko	175	2014/2015 season (100%)	0	0	0	0	0
160	RUS	Evgeni Plushenko	175	2013/2014 season (70%)	0	0	0	175	0
161	PHI	Maverick Eguia	167	2015/2016 season (100%)	0	0	0	0	0
161	PHI	Maverick Eguia	167	2014/2015 season (100%)	0	0	0	0	0
161	PHI	Maverick Eguia	167	2013/2014 season (70%)	52	0	0	115	0
162	ITA	Adrien Bannister	164	2015/2016 season (100%)	0	0	0	164	0
162	ITA	Adrien Bannister	164	2014/2015 season (100%)	0	0	0	0	0
162	ITA	Adrien Bannister	164	2013/2014 season (70%)	0	0	0	0	0
162	ITA	Alessandro Fadini	164	2015/2016 season (100%)	0	0	0	164	0
162	ITA	Alessandro Fadini	164	2014/2015 season (100%)	0	0	0	0	0
162	ITA	Alessandro Fadini	164	2013/2014 season (70%)	0	0	0	0	0
162	NED	Thomas Kennes	164	2015/2016 season (100%)	0	0	0	0	0
162	NED	Thomas Kennes	164	2014/2015 season (100%)	0	0	0	164	0
162	NED	Thomas Kennes	164	2013/2014 season (70%)	0	0	0	0	0
162	TPE	Meng Ju Lee	164	2015/2016 season (100%)	0	0	0	164	0
162	TPE	Meng Ju Lee	164	2014/2015 season (100%)	0	0	0	0	0
162	TPE	Meng Ju Lee	164	2013/2014 season (70%)	0	0	0	0	0
162	FIN	Juho Pirinen	164	2015/2016 season (100%)	0	0	0	164	0
162	FIN	Juho Pirinen	164	2014/2015 season (100%)	0	0	0	0	0
162	FIN	Juho Pirinen	164	2013/2014 season (70%)	0	0	0	0	0
162	ITA	Alberto Vanz	164	2015/2016 season (100%)	0	0	0	164	0
162	ITA	Alberto Vanz	164	2014/2015 season (100%)	0	0	0	0	0
162	ITA	Alberto Vanz	164	2013/2014 season (70%)	0	0	0	0	0
168	SWE	Marcus Björk	160	2015/2016 season (100%)	0	0	0	0	0
168	SWE	Marcus Björk	160	2014/2015 season (100%)	0	0	0	160	0
168	SWE	Marcus Björk	160	2013/2014 season (70%)	0	0	0	0	0
168	HKG	Leslie Ip	160	2015/2016 season (100%)	92	0	0	0	0
168	HKG	Leslie Ip	160	2014/2015 season (100%)	0	0	0	0	0
168	HKG	Leslie Ip	160	2013/2014 season (70%)	0	68	0	0	0
168	SVK	Jakub Krsnak	160	2015/2016 season (100%)	0	0	0	0	0
168	SVK	Jakub Krsnak	160	2014/2015 season (100%)	0	0	0	160	0
168	SVK	Jakub Krsnak	160	2013/2014 season (70%)	0	0	0	0	0
168	GBR	Harry Mattick	160	2015/2016 season (100%)	0	0	0	0	0
168	GBR	Harry Mattick	160	2014/2015 season (100%)	0	0	0	160	0
168	GBR	Harry Mattick	160	2013/2014 season (70%)	0	0	0	0	0
172	HKG	Harry Hau Yin Lee	157	2015/2016 season (100%)	83	0	0	0	0
172	HKG	Harry Hau Yin Lee	157	2014/2015 season (100%)	74	0	0	0	0
172	HKG	Harry Hau Yin Lee	157	2013/2014 season (70%)	0	0	0	0	0
173	CZE	Pavel Kaska	156	2015/2016 season (100%)	0	0	0	0	0
173	CZE	Pavel Kaska	156	2014/2015 season (100%)	156	0	0	0	0
173	CZE	Pavel Kaska	156	2013/2014 season (70%)	0	0	0	0	0
174	CAN	Christophe Belley-Lemelin	144	2015/2016 season (100%)	0	0	0	144	0
174	CAN	Christophe Belley-Lemelin	144	2014/2015 season (100%)	0	0	0	0	0
174	CAN	Christophe Belley-Lemelin	144	2013/2014 season (70%)	0	0	0	0	0
174	KAZ	Artur Panikhin	144	2015/2016 season (100%)	0	0	0	144	0
174	KAZ	Artur Panikhin	144	2014/2015 season (100%)	0	0	0	0	0
174	KAZ	Artur Panikhin	144	2013/2014 season (70%)	0	0	0	0	0
174	FIN	Bela Papp	144	2015/2016 season (100%)	0	0	0	0	0
174	FIN	Bela Papp	144	2014/2015 season (100%)	0	0	0	144	0
174	FIN	Bela Papp	144	2013/2014 season (70%)	0	0	0	0	0
177	ITA	Paolo Bacchini	142	2015/2016 season (100%)	0	0	0	0	0
177	ITA	Paolo Bacchini	142	2014/2015 season (100%)	0	0	0	0	0
177	ITA	Paolo Bacchini	142	2013/2014 season (70%)	0	0	0	142	0
177	GER	Christopher Berneck	142	2015/2016 season (100%)	0	0	0	0	0
177	GER	Christopher Berneck	142	2014/2015 season (100%)	0	0	0	0	0
177	GER	Christopher Berneck	142	2013/2014 season (70%)	0	0	0	142	0
179	SWE	Illya Solomin	136	2015/2016 season (100%)	0	97	0	0	0
179	SWE	Illya Solomin	136	2014/2015 season (100%)	0	0	0	0	0
179	SWE	Illya Solomin	136	2013/2014 season (70%)	39	0	0	0	0
180	USA	Paolo Borromeo	133	2015/2016 season (100%)	0	0	0	0	0
180	USA	Paolo Borromeo	133	2014/2015 season (100%)	0	133	0	0	0
180	USA	Paolo Borromeo	133	2013/2014 season (70%)	0	0	0	0	0
180	ESP	Aleix Gabara	133	2015/2016 season (100%)	0	133	0	0	0
180	ESP	Aleix Gabara	133	2014/2015 season (100%)	0	0	0	0	0
180	ESP	Aleix Gabara	133	2013/2014 season (70%)	0	0	0	0	0
180	USA	Oleksiy Melnyk	133	2015/2016 season (100%)	0	133	0	0	0
180	USA	Oleksiy Melnyk	133	2014/2015 season (100%)	0	0	0	0	0
180	USA	Oleksiy Melnyk	133	2013/2014 season (70%)	0	0	0	0	0
180	JPN	Mitsuki Sumoto	133	2015/2016 season (100%)	0	133	0	0	0
180	JPN	Mitsuki Sumoto	133	2014/2015 season (100%)	0	0	0	0	0
180	JPN	Mitsuki Sumoto	133	2013/2014 season (70%)	0	0	0	0	0
184	PRK	Hyon Choe	127	2015/2016 season (100%)	0	0	0	0	0
184	PRK	Hyon Choe	127	2014/2015 season (100%)	0	0	0	0	0
184	PRK	Hyon Choe	127	2013/2014 season (70%)	0	0	0	127	0
184	BLR	Mikhail Karaliuk	127	2015/2016 season (100%)	0	0	0	0	0
184	BLR	Mikhail Karaliuk	127	2014/2015 season (100%)	0	0	0	0	0
184	BLR	Mikhail Karaliuk	127	2013/2014 season (70%)	0	0	0	127	0
184	GEO	Irakli Maysuradze	127	2015/2016 season (100%)	44	0	0	0	0
184	GEO	Irakli Maysuradze	127	2014/2015 season (100%)	83	0	0	0	0
184	GEO	Irakli Maysuradze	127	2013/2014 season (70%)	0	0	0	0	0
184	RUS	Roman Savosin	127	2015/2016 season (100%)	127	0	0	0	0
184	RUS	Roman Savosin	127	2014/2015 season (100%)	0	0	0	0	0
184	RUS	Roman Savosin	127	2013/2014 season (70%)	0	0	0	0	0
184	AUS	Mark Webster	127	2015/2016 season (100%)	0	0	0	0	0
184	AUS	Mark Webster	127	2014/2015 season (100%)	0	0	0	0	0
184	AUS	Mark Webster	127	2013/2014 season (70%)	0	0	0	127	0
189	MON	Kim Lucine	121	2015/2016 season (100%)	0	0	0	0	0
189	MON	Kim Lucine	121	2014/2015 season (100%)	0	0	0	0	0
189	MON	Kim Lucine	121	2013/2014 season (70%)	121	0	0	0	0
190	JPN	Sena Miyake	120	2015/2016 season (100%)	0	120	0	0	0
190	JPN	Sena Miyake	120	2014/2015 season (100%)	0	0	0	0	0
190	JPN	Sena Miyake	120	2013/2014 season (70%)	0	0	0	0	0
191	FRA	Florian Lejeune	115	2015/2016 season (100%)	0	0	0	0	0
191	FRA	Florian Lejeune	115	2014/2015 season (100%)	0	0	0	0	0
191	FRA	Florian Lejeune	115	2013/2014 season (70%)	0	0	0	115	0
191	ISR	Stanislav Samohin	115	2015/2016 season (100%)	0	0	0	0	0
191	ISR	Stanislav Samohin	115	2014/2015 season (100%)	0	0	0	0	0
191	ISR	Stanislav Samohin	115	2013/2014 season (70%)	0	0	0	115	0
191	JPN	Akio Sasaki	115	2015/2016 season (100%)	0	0	0	0	0
191	JPN	Akio Sasaki	115	2014/2015 season (100%)	0	0	0	0	0
191	JPN	Akio Sasaki	115	2013/2014 season (70%)	0	0	0	115	0
191	RUS	Kirill Sokolov	115	2015/2016 season (100%)	0	0	0	0	0
191	RUS	Kirill Sokolov	115	2014/2015 season (100%)	0	0	0	0	0
191	RUS	Kirill Sokolov	115	2013/2014 season (70%)	0	0	0	115	0
195	JPN	Kazuki Tomono	114	2015/2016 season (100%)	114	0	0	0	0
195	JPN	Kazuki Tomono	114	2014/2015 season (100%)	0	0	0	0	0
195	JPN	Kazuki Tomono	114	2013/2014 season (70%)	0	0	0	0	0
196	UKR	Yakov Godorozha	113	2015/2016 season (100%)	0	0	0	0	0
196	UKR	Yakov Godorozha	113	2014/2015 season (100%)	0	0	0	0	0
196	UKR	Yakov Godorozha	113	2013/2014 season (70%)	113	0	0	0	0
197	USA	Chase Belmontes	108	2015/2016 season (100%)	0	0	0	0	0
197	USA	Chase Belmontes	108	2014/2015 season (100%)	0	108	0	0	0
197	USA	Chase Belmontes	108	2013/2014 season (70%)	0	0	0	0	0
197	USA	Daniel Kulenkamp	108	2015/2016 season (100%)	0	0	0	0	0
197	USA	Daniel Kulenkamp	108	2014/2015 season (100%)	0	108	0	0	0
197	USA	Daniel Kulenkamp	108	2013/2014 season (70%)	0	0	0	0	0
197	CHN	Yunda Lu	108	2015/2016 season (100%)	0	108	0	0	0
197	CHN	Yunda Lu	108	2014/2015 season (100%)	0	0	0	0	0
197	CHN	Yunda Lu	108	2013/2014 season (70%)	0	0	0	0	0
197	SWE	Nicky Obreykov	108	2015/2016 season (100%)	0	0	0	0	0
197	SWE	Nicky Obreykov	108	2014/2015 season (100%)	0	108	0	0	0
197	SWE	Nicky Obreykov	108	2013/2014 season (70%)	0	0	0	0	0
197	RUS	Vladislav Tarasenko	108	2015/2016 season (100%)	0	108	0	0	0
197	RUS	Vladislav Tarasenko	108	2014/2015 season (100%)	0	0	0	0	0
197	RUS	Vladislav Tarasenko	108	2013/2014 season (70%)	0	0	0	0	0
197	USA	Luke West	108	2015/2016 season (100%)	0	0	0	0	0
197	USA	Luke West	108	2014/2015 season (100%)	0	108	0	0	0
197	USA	Luke West	108	2013/2014 season (70%)	0	0	0	0	0
203	CHN	Yuhang Guan	102	2015/2016 season (100%)	0	0	0	0	0
203	CHN	Yuhang Guan	102	2014/2015 season (100%)	102	0	0	0	0
203	CHN	Yuhang Guan	102	2013/2014 season (70%)	0	0	0	0	0
203	ROU	Zoltán Kelemen	102	2015/2016 season (100%)	0	0	0	0	0
203	ROU	Zoltán Kelemen	102	2014/2015 season (100%)	0	0	0	0	0
203	ROU	Zoltán Kelemen	102	2013/2014 season (70%)	102	0	0	0	0
205	USA	Anthony Boucher	97	2015/2016 season (100%)	0	97	0	0	0
205	USA	Anthony Boucher	97	2014/2015 season (100%)	0	0	0	0	0
205	USA	Anthony Boucher	97	2013/2014 season (70%)	0	0	0	0	0
205	JPN	Kento Kajita	97	2015/2016 season (100%)	0	0	0	0	0
205	JPN	Kento Kajita	97	2014/2015 season (100%)	0	97	0	0	0
205	JPN	Kento Kajita	97	2013/2014 season (70%)	0	0	0	0	0
207	CZE	Tomas Kupka	93	2015/2016 season (100%)	0	0	0	0	0
207	CZE	Tomas Kupka	93	2014/2015 season (100%)	0	0	0	0	0
207	CZE	Tomas Kupka	93	2013/2014 season (70%)	0	93	0	0	0
208	UKR	Igor Reznichenko	84	2015/2016 season (100%)	0	0	0	0	0
208	UKR	Igor Reznichenko	84	2014/2015 season (100%)	0	0	0	0	0
208	UKR	Igor Reznichenko	84	2013/2014 season (70%)	0	84	0	0	0
209	RUS	Alexei Genia	76	2015/2016 season (100%)	0	0	0	0	0
209	RUS	Alexei Genia	76	2014/2015 season (100%)	0	0	0	0	0
209	RUS	Alexei Genia	76	2013/2014 season (70%)	0	76	0	0	0
209	CZE	Jan Kurnik	76	2015/2016 season (100%)	0	0	0	0	0
209	CZE	Jan Kurnik	76	2014/2015 season (100%)	0	0	0	0	0
209	CZE	Jan Kurnik	76	2013/2014 season (70%)	0	76	0	0	0
209	JPN	Taichiro Yamakuma	76	2015/2016 season (100%)	0	0	0	0	0
209	JPN	Taichiro Yamakuma	76	2014/2015 season (100%)	0	0	0	0	0
209	JPN	Taichiro Yamakuma	76	2013/2014 season (70%)	0	76	0	0	0
212	EST	Aleksandr Selevko	75	2015/2016 season (100%)	75	0	0	0	0
212	EST	Aleksandr Selevko	75	2014/2015 season (100%)	0	0	0	0	0
212	EST	Aleksandr Selevko	75	2013/2014 season (70%)	0	0	0	0	0
213	EST	Viktor Romanenkov	74	2015/2016 season (100%)	0	0	0	0	0
213	EST	Viktor Romanenkov	74	2014/2015 season (100%)	0	0	0	0	0
213	EST	Viktor Romanenkov	74	2013/2014 season (70%)	74	0	0	0	0
214	JPN	Taichi Honda	68	2015/2016 season (100%)	0	0	0	0	0
214	JPN	Taichi Honda	68	2014/2015 season (100%)	0	0	0	0	0
214	JPN	Taichi Honda	68	2013/2014 season (70%)	0	68	0	0	0
215	TPE	Jordan Ju	64	2015/2016 season (100%)	0	0	0	0	0
215	TPE	Jordan Ju	64	2014/2015 season (100%)	0	0	0	0	0
215	TPE	Jordan Ju	64	2013/2014 season (70%)	64	0	0	0	0
216	ITA	Paul Bonifacio Parkinson	58	2015/2016 season (100%)	0	0	0	0	0
216	ITA	Paul Bonifacio Parkinson	58	2014/2015 season (100%)	0	0	0	0	0
216	ITA	Paul Bonifacio Parkinson	58	2013/2014 season (70%)	58	0	0	0	0
217	GBR	Josh Brown	49	2015/2016 season (100%)	49	0	0	0	0
217	GBR	Josh Brown	49	2014/2015 season (100%)	0	0	0	0	0
217	GBR	Josh Brown	49	2013/2014 season (70%)	0	0	0	0	0
218	ESP	Victor Bustamante	34	2015/2016 season (100%)	0	0	0	0	0
218	ESP	Victor Bustamante	34	2014/2015 season (100%)	0	0	0	0	0
218	ESP	Victor Bustamante	34	2013/2014 season (70%)	34	0	0	0	0

==== Ladies' singles (243 skaters) ====
As of 3 April 2016

Rank	Nation	Skater	Points	Season	ISU Championships or Olympics	(Junior) Grand Prix and Final		Selected International Competition	
Rank	Nation	Skater	Points	Season	Best	Best	2nd Best	Best	2nd Best
1	JPN	Satoko Miyahara	4638	2015/2016 season (100%)	840	720	400	300	0
1	JPN	Satoko Miyahara	4638	2014/2015 season (100%)	1080	324	324	300	0
1	JPN	Satoko Miyahara	4638	2013/2014 season (70%)	529	183	183	175	175
2	RUS	Elizaveta Tuktamysheva	4222	2015/2016 season (100%)	0	360	262	300	300
2	RUS	Elizaveta Tuktamysheva	4222	2014/2015 season (100%)	1200	800	400	300	300
2	RUS	Elizaveta Tuktamysheva	4222	2013/2014 season (70%)	0	204	204	142	142
3	RUS	Elena Radionova	4079	2015/2016 season (100%)	756	648	400	0	0
3	RUS	Elena Radionova	4079	2014/2015 season (100%)	972	720	400	0	0
3	RUS	Elena Radionova	4079	2013/2014 season (70%)	350	408	252	175	0
4	USA	Ashley Wagner	3952	2015/2016 season (100%)	1080	583	400	0	0
4	USA	Ashley Wagner	3952	2014/2015 season (100%)	787	648	360	0	0
4	USA	Ashley Wagner	3952	2013/2014 season (70%)	447	454	280	0	0
5	RUS	Anna Pogorilaya	3827	2015/2016 season (100%)	972	292	0	300	270
5	RUS	Anna Pogorilaya	3827	2014/2015 season (100%)	680	583	400	0	0
5	RUS	Anna Pogorilaya	3827	2013/2014 season (70%)	613	330	280	0	0
6	USA	Gracie Gold	3800	2015/2016 season (100%)	875	525	400	0	0
6	USA	Gracie Gold	3800	2014/2015 season (100%)	875	400	324	243	0
6	USA	Gracie Gold	3800	2013/2014 season (70%)	613	227	204	158	0
6	RUS	Evgenia Medvedeva	3800	2015/2016 season (100%)	1200	800	400	300	0
6	RUS	Evgenia Medvedeva	3800	2014/2015 season (100%)	500	350	250	0	0
6	RUS	Evgenia Medvedeva	3800	2013/2014 season (70%)	284	199	175	0	0
8	JPN	Rika Hongo	3601	2015/2016 season (100%)	680	360	262	300	0
8	JPN	Rika Hongo	3601	2014/2015 season (100%)	709	472	400	243	0
8	JPN	Rika Hongo	3601	2013/2014 season (70%)	167	142	127	175	0
9	RUS	Yulia Lipnitskaya	3200	2015/2016 season (100%)	0	360	236	270	250
9	RUS	Yulia Lipnitskaya	3200	2014/2015 season (100%)	0	525	360	0	0
9	RUS	Yulia Lipnitskaya	3200	2013/2014 season (70%)	756	504	280	175	0
10	JPN	Mao Asada	3190	2015/2016 season (100%)	638	472	400	0	0
10	JPN	Mao Asada	3190	2014/2015 season (100%)	0	0	0	0	0
10	JPN	Mao Asada	3190	2013/2014 season (70%)	840	560	280	0	0
11	JPN	Kanako Murakami	2836	2015/2016 season (100%)	446	292	292	160	0
11	JPN	Kanako Murakami	2836	2014/2015 season (100%)	638	324	292	250	0
11	JPN	Kanako Murakami	2836	2013/2014 season (70%)	588	204	149	0	0
12	USA	Mirai Nagasu	2824	2015/2016 season (100%)	756	262	0	300	198
12	USA	Mirai Nagasu	2824	2014/2015 season (100%)	0	292	236	198	0
12	USA	Mirai Nagasu	2824	2013/2014 season (70%)	228	227	134	127	0
13	LAT	Angelina Kuchvalska	2607	2015/2016 season (100%)	612	213	0	270	250
13	LAT	Angelina Kuchvalska	2607	2014/2015 season (100%)	446	133	133	300	250
13	LAT	Angelina Kuchvalska	2607	2013/2014 season (70%)	53	0	0	0	0
14	USA	Polina Edmunds	2553	2015/2016 season (100%)	0	292	236	0	0
14	USA	Polina Edmunds	2553	2014/2015 season (100%)	840	292	191	300	0
14	USA	Polina Edmunds	2553	2013/2014 season (70%)	402	178	175	0	0
15	ITA	Roberta Rodeghiero	2540	2015/2016 season (100%)	551	324	213	250	250
15	ITA	Roberta Rodeghiero	2540	2014/2015 season (100%)	402	0	0	300	250
15	ITA	Roberta Rodeghiero	2540	2013/2014 season (70%)	205	0	0	175	175
16	CAN	Gabrielle Daleman	2478	2015/2016 season (100%)	517	262	236	219	0
16	CAN	Gabrielle Daleman	2478	2014/2015 season (100%)	446	262	236	300	0
16	CAN	Gabrielle Daleman	2478	2013/2014 season (70%)	237	142	127	0	0
17	USA	Courtney Hicks	2429	2015/2016 season (100%)	0	360	236	243	0
17	USA	Courtney Hicks	2429	2014/2015 season (100%)	0	292	292	270	0
17	USA	Courtney Hicks	2429	2013/2014 season (70%)	386	165	0	175	175
18	RUS	Alena Leonova	2415	2015/2016 season (100%)	0	191	191	270	250
18	RUS	Alena Leonova	2415	2014/2015 season (100%)	0	360	236	270	219
18	RUS	Alena Leonova	2415	2013/2014 season (70%)	428	149	0	0	0
19	RUS	Adelina Sotnikova	2232	2015/2016 season (100%)	0	324	0	270	178
19	RUS	Adelina Sotnikova	2232	2014/2015 season (100%)	0	0	0	0	0
19	RUS	Adelina Sotnikova	2232	2013/2014 season (70%)	840	368	252	0	0
20	RUS	Serafima Sakhanovich	2215	2015/2016 season (100%)	0	133	0	270	219
20	RUS	Serafima Sakhanovich	2215	2014/2015 season (100%)	450	315	250	0	0
20	RUS	Serafima Sakhanovich	2215	2013/2014 season (70%)	315	221	175	0	0
20	KAZ	Elizabet Tursynbaeva	2215	2015/2016 season (100%)	377	292	213	270	270
20	KAZ	Elizabet Tursynbaeva	2215	2014/2015 season (100%)	365	225	203	0	0
20	KAZ	Elizabet Tursynbaeva	2215	2013/2014 season (70%)	122	158	115	0	0
22	SVK	Nicole Rajicová	2183	2015/2016 season (100%)	339	213	213	198	0
22	SVK	Nicole Rajicová	2183	2014/2015 season (100%)	293	182	182	243	178
22	SVK	Nicole Rajicová	2183	2013/2014 season (70%)	109	84	0	142	142
23	RUS	Maria Sotskova	2148	2015/2016 season (100%)	450	315	250	300	0
23	RUS	Maria Sotskova	2148	2014/2015 season (100%)	328	255	250	0	0
23	RUS	Maria Sotskova	2148	2013/2014 season (70%)	0	245	158	0	0
24	CAN	Alaine Chartrand	2068	2015/2016 season (100%)	293	236	0	219	0
24	CAN	Alaine Chartrand	2068	2014/2015 season (100%)	418	324	213	219	0
24	CAN	Alaine Chartrand	2068	2013/2014 season (70%)	312	127	93	0	0
25	SWE	Joshi Helgesson	1994	2015/2016 season (100%)	362	0	0	250	250
25	SWE	Joshi Helgesson	1994	2014/2015 season (100%)	612	0	0	270	250
25	SWE	Joshi Helgesson	1994	2013/2014 season (70%)	253	0	0	175	175
26	KOR	So Youn Park	1923	2015/2016 season (100%)	612	191	0	219	0
26	KOR	So Youn Park	1923	2014/2015 season (100%)	377	262	262	0	0
26	KOR	So Youn Park	1923	2013/2014 season (70%)	362	0	0	0	0
27	USA	Karen Chen	1917	2015/2016 season (100%)	264	262	262	243	219
27	USA	Karen Chen	1917	2014/2015 season (100%)	239	225	203	0	0
27	USA	Karen Chen	1917	2013/2014 season (70%)	151	175	142	0	0
28	JPN	Yuka Nagai	1894	2015/2016 season (100%)	0	324	191	250	178
28	JPN	Yuka Nagai	1894	2014/2015 season (100%)	496	230	225	0	0
28	JPN	Yuka Nagai	1894	2013/2014 season (70%)	0	84	0	0	0
29	ARM	Anastasia Galustyan	1781	2015/2016 season (100%)	192	108	0	243	225
29	ARM	Anastasia Galustyan	1781	2014/2015 season (100%)	237	120	0	270	225
29	ARM	Anastasia Galustyan	1781	2013/2014 season (70%)	0	93	68	115	0
30	JPN	Wakaba Higuchi	1733	2015/2016 season (100%)	405	225	164	0	0
30	JPN	Wakaba Higuchi	1733	2014/2015 season (100%)	405	284	250	0	0
30	JPN	Wakaba Higuchi	1733	2013/2014 season (70%)	0	0	0	0	0
31	JPN	Haruka Imai	1731	2015/2016 season (100%)	0	0	0	225	0
31	JPN	Haruka Imai	1731	2014/2015 season (100%)	0	191	191	198	0
31	JPN	Haruka Imai	1731	2013/2014 season (70%)	428	165	0	175	158
32	GER	Lutricia Bock	1694	2015/2016 season (100%)	0	0	0	250	225
32	GER	Lutricia Bock	1694	2014/2015 season (100%)	127	182	108	270	225
32	GER	Lutricia Bock	1694	2013/2014 season (70%)	110	104	93	0	0
33	CHN	Zijun Li	1689	2015/2016 season (100%)	418	213	0	0	0
33	CHN	Zijun Li	1689	2014/2015 season (100%)	551	236	213	0	0
33	CHN	Zijun Li	1689	2013/2014 season (70%)	476	0	0	0	0
34	HUN	Ivett Tóth	1624	2015/2016 season (100%)	293	148	120	225	225
34	HUN	Ivett Tóth	1624	2014/2015 season (100%)	0	120	0	250	243
34	HUN	Ivett Tóth	1624	2013/2014 season (70%)	0	0	0	0	0
35	FRA	Maé-Bérénice Méité	1602	2015/2016 season (100%)	496	0	0	0	0
35	FRA	Maé-Bérénice Méité	1602	2014/2015 season (100%)	496	262	0	0	0
35	FRA	Maé-Bérénice Méité	1602	2013/2014 season (70%)	386	183	165	0	0
36	FRA	Laurine Lecavelier	1568	2015/2016 season (100%)	325	0	0	250	225
36	FRA	Laurine Lecavelier	1568	2014/2015 season (100%)	325	0	0	203	164
36	FRA	Laurine Lecavelier	1568	2013/2014 season (70%)	166	76	0	127	0
37	KOR	Da Bin Choi	1513	2015/2016 season (100%)	402	203	203	144	0
37	KOR	Da Bin Choi	1513	2014/2015 season (100%)	215	182	164	0	0
37	KOR	Da Bin Choi	1513	2013/2014 season (70%)	207	127	115	0	0
38	FIN	Jenni Saarinen	1474	2015/2016 season (100%)	0	0	0	182	182
38	FIN	Jenni Saarinen	1474	2014/2015 season (100%)	141	108	108	250	243
38	FIN	Jenni Saarinen	1474	2013/2014 season (70%)	99	93	68	0	0
39	USA	Angela Wang	1453	2015/2016 season (100%)	0	191	0	243	203
39	USA	Angela Wang	1453	2014/2015 season (100%)	0	0	0	270	243
39	USA	Angela Wang	1453	2013/2014 season (70%)	0	158	145	0	0
40	GER	Nicole Schott	1446	2015/2016 season (100%)	0	0	0	219	182
40	GER	Nicole Schott	1446	2014/2015 season (100%)	362	133	97	250	203
40	GER	Nicole Schott	1446	2013/2014 season (70%)	0	0	0	0	0
41	GER	Nathalie Weinzierl	1442	2015/2016 season (100%)	446	0	0	178	164
41	GER	Nathalie Weinzierl	1442	2014/2015 season (100%)	264	0	0	198	160
41	GER	Nathalie Weinzierl	1442	2013/2014 season (70%)	281	0	0	175	142
42	FIN	Viveca Lindfors	1339	2015/2016 season (100%)	402	108	0	225	219
42	FIN	Viveca Lindfors	1339	2014/2015 season (100%)	0	0	0	203	182
42	FIN	Viveca Lindfors	1339	2013/2014 season (70%)	0	0	0	0	0
43	AUS	Brooklee Han	1337	2015/2016 season (100%)	156	0	0	178	160
43	AUS	Brooklee Han	1337	2014/2015 season (100%)	156	191	0	219	178
43	AUS	Brooklee Han	1337	2013/2014 season (70%)	150	84	0	175	115
44	CAN	Kaetlyn Osmond	1325	2015/2016 season (100%)	496	236	0	300	0
44	CAN	Kaetlyn Osmond	1325	2014/2015 season (100%)	0	0	0	0	0
44	CAN	Kaetlyn Osmond	1325	2013/2014 season (70%)	293	0	0	0	0
45	JPN	Riona Kato	1324	2015/2016 season (100%)	0	0	0	198	0
45	JPN	Riona Kato	1324	2014/2015 season (100%)	0	262	0	243	225
45	JPN	Riona Kato	1324	2013/2014 season (70%)	0	142	127	127	0
46	ITA	Giada Russo	1266	2015/2016 season (100%)	214	0	0	225	203
46	ITA	Giada Russo	1266	2014/2015 season (100%)	106	0	0	225	225
46	ITA	Giada Russo	1266	2013/2014 season (70%)	0	68	0	142	142
47	RUS	Maria Artemieva	1197	2015/2016 season (100%)	0	0	0	270	243
47	RUS	Maria Artemieva	1197	2014/2015 season (100%)	0	236	0	270	178
47	RUS	Maria Artemieva	1197	2013/2014 season (70%)	0	0	0	175	0
48	JPN	Mariko Kihara	1183	2015/2016 season (100%)	0	0	0	250	178
48	JPN	Mariko Kihara	1183	2014/2015 season (100%)	0	182	148	250	0
48	JPN	Mariko Kihara	1183	2013/2014 season (70%)	0	0	0	175	0
49	SWE	Isabelle Olsson	1171	2015/2016 season (100%)	74	0	0	300	203
49	SWE	Isabelle Olsson	1171	2014/2015 season (100%)	0	0	0	270	203
49	SWE	Isabelle Olsson	1171	2013/2014 season (70%)	121	0	0	175	142
50	AUS	Kailani Craine	1170	2015/2016 season (100%)	237	120	0	164	160
50	AUS	Kailani Craine	1170	2014/2015 season (100%)	264	0	0	225	0
50	AUS	Kailani Craine	1170	2013/2014 season (70%)	0	0	0	0	0
51	ITA	Carolina Kostner	1159	2015/2016 season (100%)	0	0	0	0	0
51	ITA	Carolina Kostner	1159	2014/2015 season (100%)	0	0	0	0	0
51	ITA	Carolina Kostner	1159	2013/2014 season (70%)	680	252	227	0	0
52	CZE	Eliška Brezinová	1099	2015/2016 season (100%)	83	0	0	250	0
52	CZE	Eliška Brezinová	1099	2014/2015 season (100%)	192	0	0	178	164
52	CZE	Eliška Brezinová	1099	2013/2014 season (70%)	140	0	0	175	115
52	CAN	Veronik Mallet	1099	2015/2016 season (100%)	214	0	0	250	0
52	CAN	Veronik Mallet	1099	2014/2015 season (100%)	214	0	0	160	0
52	CAN	Veronik Mallet	1099	2013/2014 season (70%)	166	134	0	127	0
54	LTU	Aleksandra Golovkina	1098	2015/2016 season (100%)	173	0	0	198	160
54	LTU	Aleksandra Golovkina	1098	2014/2015 season (100%)	126	0	0	243	198
54	LTU	Aleksandra Golovkina	1098	2013/2014 season (70%)	0	0	0	127	127
55	KOR	Na Hyun Kim	1078	2015/2016 season (100%)	362	148	120	0	0
55	KOR	Na Hyun Kim	1078	2014/2015 season (100%)	0	164	148	0	0
55	KOR	Na Hyun Kim	1078	2013/2014 season (70%)	136	115	115	0	0
56	AUT	Kerstin Frank	1056	2015/2016 season (100%)	92	0	0	225	198
56	AUT	Kerstin Frank	1056	2014/2015 season (100%)	156	0	0	203	182
56	AUT	Kerstin Frank	1056	2013/2014 season (70%)	0	0	0	175	158
56	SLO	Dasa Grm	1056	2015/2016 season (100%)	0	0	0	203	178
56	SLO	Dasa Grm	1056	2014/2015 season (100%)	200	0	0	250	225
56	SLO	Dasa Grm	1056	2013/2014 season (70%)	0	0	0	158	158
58	CZE	Elizaveta Ukolova	1055	2015/2016 season (100%)	0	97	0	225	203
58	CZE	Elizaveta Ukolova	1055	2014/2015 season (100%)	93	0	0	0	0
58	CZE	Elizaveta Ukolova	1055	2013/2014 season (70%)	92	76	0	142	127
59	LUX	Fleur Maxwell	1048	2015/2016 season (100%)	140	0	0	203	0
59	LUX	Fleur Maxwell	1048	2014/2015 season (100%)	113	0	0	225	225
59	LUX	Fleur Maxwell	1048	2013/2014 season (70%)	0	0	0	142	142
60	JPN	Marin Honda	1034	2015/2016 season (100%)	500	284	250	0	0
60	JPN	Marin Honda	1034	2014/2015 season (100%)	0	0	0	0	0
60	JPN	Marin Honda	1034	2013/2014 season (70%)	0	0	0	0	0
61	FIN	Liubov Efimenko	1028	2015/2016 season (100%)	0	0	0	225	164
61	FIN	Liubov Efimenko	1028	2014/2015 season (100%)	0	108	0	219	219
61	FIN	Liubov Efimenko	1028	2013/2014 season (70%)	0	93	0	142	0
62	JPN	Rin Nitaya	1017	2015/2016 season (100%)	0	203	182	225	0
62	JPN	Rin Nitaya	1017	2014/2015 season (100%)	0	225	182	0	0
62	JPN	Rin Nitaya	1017	2013/2014 season (70%)	0	0	0	0	0
63	NOR	Anne Line Gjersem	990	2015/2016 season (100%)	156	0	0	243	144
63	NOR	Anne Line Gjersem	990	2014/2015 season (100%)	222	0	0	225	0
63	NOR	Anne Line Gjersem	990	2013/2014 season (70%)	92	0	0	0	0
64	KOR	Hae Jin Kim	983	2015/2016 season (100%)	0	0	0	0	0
64	KOR	Hae Jin Kim	983	2014/2015 season (100%)	293	191	0	0	0
64	KOR	Hae Jin Kim	983	2013/2014 season (70%)	347	84	68	0	0
65	USA	Tyler Pierce	974	2015/2016 season (100%)	295	0	0	243	243
65	USA	Tyler Pierce	974	2014/2015 season (100%)	75	0	0	0	0
65	USA	Tyler Pierce	974	2013/2014 season (70%)	89	104	0	0	0
66	USA	Mariah Bell	946	2015/2016 season (100%)	0	191	0	178	0
66	USA	Mariah Bell	946	2014/2015 season (100%)	0	0	0	198	144
66	USA	Mariah Bell	946	2013/2014 season (70%)	0	142	93	0	0
67	JPN	Kaori Sakamoto	939	2015/2016 season (100%)	0	225	182	0	0
67	JPN	Kaori Sakamoto	939	2014/2015 season (100%)	295	133	0	0	0
67	JPN	Kaori Sakamoto	939	2013/2014 season (70%)	0	104	0	0	0
68	NOR	Camilla Gjersem	893	2015/2016 season (100%)	0	0	0	250	0
68	NOR	Camilla Gjersem	893	2014/2015 season (100%)	102	0	0	219	164
68	NOR	Camilla Gjersem	893	2013/2014 season (70%)	0	0	0	158	0
69	JPN	Miyabi Oba	888	2015/2016 season (100%)	0	0	0	0	0
69	JPN	Miyabi Oba	888	2014/2015 season (100%)	0	236	0	225	0
69	JPN	Miyabi Oba	888	2013/2014 season (70%)	0	142	127	158	0
70	JPN	Yuna Shiraiwa	865	2015/2016 season (100%)	365	250	250	0	0
70	JPN	Yuna Shiraiwa	865	2014/2015 season (100%)	0	0	0	0	0
70	JPN	Yuna Shiraiwa	865	2013/2014 season (70%)	0	0	0	0	0
70	FIN	Juulia Turkkila	865	2015/2016 season (100%)	0	0	0	178	164
70	FIN	Juulia Turkkila	865	2014/2015 season (100%)	0	0	0	178	160
70	FIN	Juulia Turkkila	865	2013/2014 season (70%)	185	0	0	142	115
72	BRA	Isadora Williams	849	2015/2016 season (100%)	0	0	0	225	225
72	BRA	Isadora Williams	849	2014/2015 season (100%)	140	0	0	144	0
72	BRA	Isadora Williams	849	2013/2014 season (70%)	0	0	0	115	0
73	USA	Amber Glenn	843	2015/2016 season (100%)	0	164	0	0	0
73	USA	Amber Glenn	843	2014/2015 season (100%)	0	203	148	0	0
73	USA	Amber Glenn	843	2013/2014 season (70%)	186	142	0	0	0
74	ITA	Valentina Marchei	836	2015/2016 season (100%)	0	0	0	0	0
74	ITA	Valentina Marchei	836	2014/2015 season (100%)	0	0	0	0	0
74	ITA	Valentina Marchei	836	2013/2014 season (70%)	347	165	149	175	0
75	ITA	Carol Bressanutti	792	2015/2016 season (100%)	0	0	0	203	0
75	ITA	Carol Bressanutti	792	2014/2015 season (100%)	0	0	0	250	164
75	ITA	Carol Bressanutti	792	2013/2014 season (70%)	0	0	0	175	142
76	SWE	Matilda Algotsson	784	2015/2016 season (100%)	237	133	0	250	164
76	SWE	Matilda Algotsson	784	2014/2015 season (100%)	0	0	0	0	0
76	SWE	Matilda Algotsson	784	2013/2014 season (70%)	0	0	0	0	0
77	UKR	Natalia Popova	781	2015/2016 season (100%)	0	0	0	0	0
77	UKR	Natalia Popova	781	2014/2015 season (100%)	173	0	0	182	0
77	UKR	Natalia Popova	781	2013/2014 season (70%)	102	149	0	175	0
78	USA	Hannah Miller	748	2015/2016 season (100%)	0	0	0	178	0
78	USA	Hannah Miller	748	2014/2015 season (100%)	0	0	0	300	270
78	USA	Hannah Miller	748	2013/2014 season (70%)	0	0	0	0	0
79	RUS	Diana Pervushkina	747	2015/2016 season (100%)	0	203	182	0	0
79	RUS	Diana Pervushkina	747	2014/2015 season (100%)	0	164	0	198	0
79	RUS	Diana Pervushkina	747	2013/2014 season (70%)	0	0	0	0	0
80	RUS	Alexandra Proklova	742	2015/2016 season (100%)	0	0	0	0	0
80	RUS	Alexandra Proklova	742	2014/2015 season (100%)	0	203	203	0	0
80	RUS	Alexandra Proklova	742	2013/2014 season (70%)	0	175	161	0	0
81	USA	Ashley Cain	740	2015/2016 season (100%)	0	0	0	164	0
81	USA	Ashley Cain	740	2014/2015 season (100%)	0	191	0	243	0
81	USA	Ashley Cain	740	2013/2014 season (70%)	0	0	0	142	0
82	LAT	Diana Nikitina	716	2015/2016 season (100%)	194	164	0	0	0
82	LAT	Diana Nikitina	716	2014/2015 season (100%)	194	164	0	0	0
82	LAT	Diana Nikitina	716	2013/2014 season (70%)	0	0	0	0	0
83	JPN	Mai Mihara	713	2015/2016 season (100%)	0	225	225	0	0
83	JPN	Mai Mihara	713	2014/2015 season (100%)	0	148	0	0	0
83	JPN	Mai Mihara	713	2013/2014 season (70%)	0	115	0	0	0
84	DEN	Pernille Sorensen	672	2015/2016 season (100%)	0	0	0	182	0
84	DEN	Pernille Sorensen	672	2014/2015 season (100%)	0	0	0	250	182
84	DEN	Pernille Sorensen	672	2013/2014 season (70%)	58	0	0	0	0
85	JPN	Miyu Nakashio	660	2015/2016 season (100%)	0	0	0	203	0
85	JPN	Miyu Nakashio	660	2014/2015 season (100%)	0	250	207	0	0
85	JPN	Miyu Nakashio	660	2013/2014 season (70%)	0	0	0	0	0
86	TPE	Amy Lin	652	2015/2016 season (100%)	192	97	0	203	160
86	TPE	Amy Lin	652	2014/2015 season (100%)	0	0	0	0	0
86	TPE	Amy Lin	652	2013/2014 season (70%)	0	0	0	0	0
87	RUS	Nikol Gosviani	650	2015/2016 season (100%)	0	0	0	0	0
87	RUS	Nikol Gosviani	650	2014/2015 season (100%)	0	0	0	0	0
87	RUS	Nikol Gosviani	650	2013/2014 season (70%)	0	183	134	175	158
88	EST	Helery Hälvin	632	2015/2016 season (100%)	126	0	0	182	182
88	EST	Helery Hälvin	632	2014/2015 season (100%)	0	0	0	0	0
88	EST	Helery Hälvin	632	2013/2014 season (70%)	0	0	0	142	0
89	ESP	Sonia Lafuente	630	2015/2016 season (100%)	0	0	0	0	0
89	ESP	Sonia Lafuente	630	2014/2015 season (100%)	140	0	0	203	160
89	ESP	Sonia Lafuente	630	2013/2014 season (70%)	0	0	0	127	0
90	GER	Sarah Hecken	624	2015/2016 season (100%)	0	0	0	0	0
90	GER	Sarah Hecken	624	2014/2015 season (100%)	0	0	0	164	144
90	GER	Sarah Hecken	624	2013/2014 season (70%)	0	0	0	158	158
91	GER	Lea Johanna Dastich	613	2015/2016 season (100%)	157	0	0	203	0
91	GER	Lea Johanna Dastich	613	2014/2015 season (100%)	0	133	120	0	0
91	GER	Lea Johanna Dastich	613	2013/2014 season (70%)	0	0	0	0	0
92	RUS	Polina Tsurskaya	600	2015/2016 season (100%)	0	350	250	0	0
92	RUS	Polina Tsurskaya	600	2014/2015 season (100%)	0	0	0	0	0
92	RUS	Polina Tsurskaya	600	2013/2014 season (70%)	0	0	0	0	0
93	SUI	Anna Ovcharova	595	2015/2016 season (100%)	0	0	0	0	0
93	SUI	Anna Ovcharova	595	2014/2015 season (100%)	0	0	0	182	0
93	SUI	Anna Ovcharova	595	2013/2014 season (70%)	113	0	0	158	142
94	CHN	Xiangning Li	590	2015/2016 season (100%)	68	148	148	0	0
94	CHN	Xiangning Li	590	2014/2015 season (100%)	61	97	0	0	0
94	CHN	Xiangning Li	590	2013/2014 season (70%)	0	68	0	0	0
95	ITA	Ilaria Nogaro	589	2015/2016 season (100%)	0	0	0	225	182
95	ITA	Ilaria Nogaro	589	2014/2015 season (100%)	0	0	0	182	0
95	ITA	Ilaria Nogaro	589	2013/2014 season (70%)	0	0	0	0	0
96	NED	Niki Wories	586	2015/2016 season (100%)	131	0	0	0	0
96	NED	Niki Wories	586	2014/2015 season (100%)	49	0	0	203	203
96	NED	Niki Wories	586	2013/2014 season (70%)	0	0	0	0	0
97	CZE	Anna Dušková	575	2015/2016 season (100%)	0	97	0	203	178
97	CZE	Anna Dušková	575	2014/2015 season (100%)	0	97	0	0	0
97	CZE	Anna Dušková	575	2013/2014 season (70%)	0	0	0	0	0
98	GEO	Elene Gedevanishvili	572	2015/2016 season (100%)	0	0	0	0	0
98	GEO	Elene Gedevanishvili	572	2014/2015 season (100%)	131	213	0	0	0
98	GEO	Elene Gedevanishvili	572	2013/2014 season (70%)	228	0	0	0	0
99	FIN	Hanna Kiviniemi	510	2015/2016 season (100%)	0	0	0	164	0
99	FIN	Hanna Kiviniemi	510	2014/2015 season (100%)	0	0	0	182	164
99	FIN	Hanna Kiviniemi	510	2013/2014 season (70%)	0	0	0	0	0
100	ITA	Micol Cristini	508	2015/2016 season (100%)	0	0	0	0	0
100	ITA	Micol Cristini	508	2014/2015 season (100%)	0	0	0	203	178
100	ITA	Micol Cristini	508	2013/2014 season (70%)	0	0	0	127	0
101	KOR	Ji Hyun Byun	500	2015/2016 season (100%)	0	182	0	203	0
101	KOR	Ji Hyun Byun	500	2014/2015 season (100%)	0	0	0	0	0
101	KOR	Ji Hyun Byun	500	2013/2014 season (70%)	0	0	0	115	0
102	CHN	Kexin Zhang	497	2015/2016 season (100%)	0	0	0	0	0
102	CHN	Kexin Zhang	497	2014/2015 season (100%)	0	0	0	0	0
102	CHN	Kexin Zhang	497	2013/2014 season (70%)	205	134	0	158	0
103	RUS	Elizaveta Iushenko	486	2015/2016 season (100%)	0	0	0	0	0
103	RUS	Elizaveta Iushenko	486	2014/2015 season (100%)	0	164	164	0	0
103	RUS	Elizaveta Iushenko	486	2013/2014 season (70%)	0	158	0	0	0
104	RUS	Alisa Fedichkina	480	2015/2016 season (100%)	0	255	225	0	0
104	RUS	Alisa Fedichkina	480	2014/2015 season (100%)	0	0	0	0	0
104	RUS	Alisa Fedichkina	480	2013/2014 season (70%)	0	0	0	0	0
104	USA	Christina Gao	480	2015/2016 season (100%)	0	0	0	0	0
104	USA	Christina Gao	480	2014/2015 season (100%)	0	0	0	0	0
104	USA	Christina Gao	480	2013/2014 season (70%)	0	204	134	142	0
106	RUS	Alsu Kaiumova	460	2015/2016 season (100%)	0	0	0	0	0
106	RUS	Alsu Kaiumova	460	2014/2015 season (100%)	0	203	164	0	0
106	RUS	Alsu Kaiumova	460	2013/2014 season (70%)	0	93	0	0	0
107	HKG	Maisy Hiu Ching Ma	443	2015/2016 season (100%)	114	0	0	225	0
107	HKG	Maisy Hiu Ching Ma	443	2014/2015 season (100%)	0	0	0	0	0
107	HKG	Maisy Hiu Ching Ma	443	2013/2014 season (70%)	0	104	0	0	0
108	USA	Agnes Zawadzki	441	2015/2016 season (100%)	0	0	0	0	0
108	USA	Agnes Zawadzki	441	2014/2015 season (100%)	0	0	0	0	0
108	USA	Agnes Zawadzki	441	2013/2014 season (70%)	0	165	149	127	0
109	SLO	Nika Ceric	436	2015/2016 season (100%)	0	0	0	0	0
109	SLO	Nika Ceric	436	2014/2015 season (100%)	0	0	0	182	0
109	SLO	Nika Ceric	436	2013/2014 season (70%)	0	0	0	127	127
110	ITA	Sara Falotico	432	2015/2016 season (100%)	0	0	0	0	0
110	ITA	Sara Falotico	432	2014/2015 season (100%)	0	0	0	250	182
110	ITA	Sara Falotico	432	2013/2014 season (70%)	0	0	0	0	0
111	UKR	Anna Khnychenkova	427	2015/2016 season (100%)	180	0	0	182	0
111	UKR	Anna Khnychenkova	427	2014/2015 season (100%)	0	0	0	0	0
111	UKR	Anna Khnychenkova	427	2013/2014 season (70%)	65	0	0	0	0
112	CAN	Julianne Séguin	423	2015/2016 season (100%)	0	0	0	0	0
112	CAN	Julianne Séguin	423	2014/2015 season (100%)	0	0	0	243	0
112	CAN	Julianne Séguin	423	2013/2014 season (70%)	0	104	76	0	0
113	POL	Agata Kryger	421	2015/2016 season (100%)	0	0	0	0	0
113	POL	Agata Kryger	421	2014/2015 season (100%)	0	0	0	0	0
113	POL	Agata Kryger	421	2013/2014 season (70%)	71	0	0	175	175
114	HUN	Fruzsina Medgyesi	414	2015/2016 season (100%)	0	0	0	250	164
114	HUN	Fruzsina Medgyesi	414	2014/2015 season (100%)	0	0	0	0	0
114	HUN	Fruzsina Medgyesi	414	2013/2014 season (70%)	0	0	0	0	0
115	EST	Johanna Allik	407	2015/2016 season (100%)	0	0	0	225	182
115	EST	Johanna Allik	407	2014/2015 season (100%)	0	0	0	0	0
115	EST	Johanna Allik	407	2013/2014 season (70%)	0	0	0	0	0
116	USA	Vivian Le	406	2015/2016 season (100%)	0	203	203	0	0
116	USA	Vivian Le	406	2014/2015 season (100%)	0	0	0	0	0
116	USA	Vivian Le	406	2013/2014 season (70%)	0	0	0	0	0
117	CAN	Selena Zhao	403	2015/2016 season (100%)	0	0	0	198	0
117	CAN	Selena Zhao	403	2014/2015 season (100%)	0	108	97	0	0
117	CAN	Selena Zhao	403	2013/2014 season (70%)	0	0	0	0	0
118	CZE	Michaela-Lucie Hanzlikova	399	2015/2016 season (100%)	0	120	97	182	0
118	CZE	Michaela-Lucie Hanzlikova	399	2014/2015 season (100%)	0	0	0	0	0
118	CZE	Michaela-Lucie Hanzlikova	399	2013/2014 season (70%)	0	0	0	0	0
119	KOR	Suh Hyun Son	391	2015/2016 season (100%)	49	0	0	182	160
119	KOR	Suh Hyun Son	391	2014/2015 season (100%)	0	0	0	0	0
119	KOR	Suh Hyun Son	391	2013/2014 season (70%)	0	0	0	0	0
120	SWE	Elin Hallberg	389	2015/2016 season (100%)	0	0	0	164	0
120	SWE	Elin Hallberg	389	2014/2015 season (100%)	0	0	0	225	0
120	SWE	Elin Hallberg	389	2013/2014 season (70%)	0	0	0	0	0
121	USA	Barbie Long	381	2015/2016 season (100%)	0	0	0	0	0
121	USA	Barbie Long	381	2014/2015 season (100%)	0	0	0	198	0
121	USA	Barbie Long	381	2013/2014 season (70%)	0	115	68	0	0
122	RUS	Ekaterina Mitrofanova	373	2015/2016 season (100%)	0	225	148	0	0
122	RUS	Ekaterina Mitrofanova	373	2014/2015 season (100%)	0	0	0	0	0
122	RUS	Ekaterina Mitrofanova	373	2013/2014 season (70%)	0	0	0	0	0
123	MEX	Reyna Hamui	372	2015/2016 season (100%)	0	0	0	0	0
123	MEX	Reyna Hamui	372	2014/2015 season (100%)	126	0	0	0	0
123	MEX	Reyna Hamui	372	2013/2014 season (70%)	88	0	0	158	0
124	RUS	Maria Stavitskaia	371	2015/2016 season (100%)	0	0	0	0	0
124	RUS	Maria Stavitskaia	371	2014/2015 season (100%)	0	213	0	0	0
124	RUS	Maria Stavitskaia	371	2013/2014 season (70%)	0	0	0	158	0
125	CAN	Roxanne Rheault	367	2015/2016 season (100%)	0	0	0	203	164
125	CAN	Roxanne Rheault	367	2014/2015 season (100%)	0	0	0	0	0
125	CAN	Roxanne Rheault	367	2013/2014 season (70%)	0	0	0	0	0
126	ITA	Chiara Calderone	364	2015/2016 season (100%)	0	0	0	182	0
126	ITA	Chiara Calderone	364	2014/2015 season (100%)	0	0	0	182	0
126	ITA	Chiara Calderone	364	2013/2014 season (70%)	0	0	0	0	0
126	FRA	Anais Ventard	364	2015/2016 season (100%)	0	0	0	0	0
126	FRA	Anais Ventard	364	2014/2015 season (100%)	0	0	0	0	0
126	FRA	Anais Ventard	364	2013/2014 season (70%)	80	0	0	142	142
128	RUS	Valeriya Mikhailova	346	2015/2016 season (100%)	0	182	164	0	0
128	RUS	Valeriya Mikhailova	346	2014/2015 season (100%)	0	0	0	0	0
128	RUS	Valeriya Mikhailova	346	2013/2014 season (70%)	0	0	0	0	0
129	RSA	Michaela Du Toit	343	2015/2016 season (100%)	140	0	0	203	0
129	RSA	Michaela Du Toit	343	2014/2015 season (100%)	0	0	0	0	0
129	RSA	Michaela Du Toit	343	2013/2014 season (70%)	0	0	0	0	0
130	GBR	Karly Robertson	342	2015/2016 season (100%)	0	0	0	182	0
130	GBR	Karly Robertson	342	2014/2015 season (100%)	0	0	0	160	0
130	GBR	Karly Robertson	342	2013/2014 season (70%)	0	0	0	0	0
131	PHI	Melissa Bulanhagui	334	2015/2016 season (100%)	0	0	0	0	0
131	PHI	Melissa Bulanhagui	334	2014/2015 season (100%)	192	0	0	0	0
131	PHI	Melissa Bulanhagui	334	2013/2014 season (70%)	0	0	0	142	0
132	USA	Leah Keiser	323	2015/2016 season (100%)	0	0	0	0	0
132	USA	Leah Keiser	323	2014/2015 season (100%)	0	203	120	0	0
132	USA	Leah Keiser	323	2013/2014 season (70%)	0	0	0	0	0
133	ITA	Francesca Rio	316	2015/2016 season (100%)	0	0	0	0	0
133	ITA	Francesca Rio	316	2014/2015 season (100%)	0	0	0	0	0
133	ITA	Francesca Rio	316	2013/2014 season (70%)	0	0	0	158	158
134	CHN	Ziquan Zhao	307	2015/2016 season (100%)	173	0	0	0	0
134	CHN	Ziquan Zhao	307	2014/2015 season (100%)	0	0	0	0	0
134	CHN	Ziquan Zhao	307	2013/2014 season (70%)	134	0	0	0	0
135	SUI	Tanja Odermatt	306	2015/2016 season (100%)	0	0	0	0	0
135	SUI	Tanja Odermatt	306	2014/2015 season (100%)	0	0	0	164	0
135	SUI	Tanja Odermatt	306	2013/2014 season (70%)	0	0	0	142	0
136	EST	Gerli Liinamäe	304	2015/2016 season (100%)	0	0	0	164	0
136	EST	Gerli Liinamäe	304	2014/2015 season (100%)	92	0	0	0	0
136	EST	Gerli Liinamäe	304	2013/2014 season (70%)	48	0	0	0	0
137	FIN	Kiira Korpi	300	2015/2016 season (100%)	0	0	0	0	0
137	FIN	Kiira Korpi	300	2014/2015 season (100%)	0	0	0	300	0
137	FIN	Kiira Korpi	300	2013/2014 season (70%)	0	0	0	0	0
138	FIN	Emilia Toikkanen	297	2015/2016 season (100%)	0	0	0	182	0
138	FIN	Emilia Toikkanen	297	2014/2015 season (100%)	0	0	0	0	0
138	FIN	Emilia Toikkanen	297	2013/2014 season (70%)	0	0	0	115	0
139	USA	Bradie Tennell	294	2015/2016 season (100%)	174	0	0	0	0
139	USA	Bradie Tennell	294	2014/2015 season (100%)	0	120	0	0	0
139	USA	Bradie Tennell	294	2013/2014 season (70%)	0	0	0	0	0
140	RUS	Polina Agafonova	285	2015/2016 season (100%)	0	0	0	0	0
140	RUS	Polina Agafonova	285	2014/2015 season (100%)	0	0	0	0	0
140	RUS	Polina Agafonova	285	2013/2014 season (70%)	0	0	0	158	127
140	ISR	Danielle Montalbano	285	2015/2016 season (100%)	0	0	0	0	0
140	ISR	Danielle Montalbano	285	2014/2015 season (100%)	0	0	0	0	0
140	ISR	Danielle Montalbano	285	2013/2014 season (70%)	0	0	0	158	127
142	KOR	So Hyun An	284	2015/2016 season (100%)	0	164	120	0	0
142	KOR	So Hyun An	284	2014/2015 season (100%)	0	0	0	0	0
142	KOR	So Hyun An	284	2013/2014 season (70%)	0	0	0	0	0
143	PHI	Alisson Krystle Perticheto	282	2015/2016 season (100%)	0	0	0	0	0
143	PHI	Alisson Krystle Perticheto	282	2014/2015 season (100%)	173	0	0	0	0
143	PHI	Alisson Krystle Perticheto	282	2013/2014 season (70%)	109	0	0	0	0
144	ITA	Sara Casella	279	2015/2016 season (100%)	0	164	0	0	0
144	ITA	Sara Casella	279	2014/2015 season (100%)	0	0	0	0	0
144	ITA	Sara Casella	279	2013/2014 season (70%)	0	0	0	115	0
144	JPN	Yura Matsuda	279	2015/2016 season (100%)	0	203	0	0	0
144	JPN	Yura Matsuda	279	2014/2015 season (100%)	0	0	0	0	0
144	JPN	Yura Matsuda	279	2013/2014 season (70%)	0	76	0	0	0
146	DEN	Anita Madsen	273	2015/2016 season (100%)	0	0	0	0	0
146	DEN	Anita Madsen	273	2014/2015 season (100%)	0	0	0	0	0
146	DEN	Anita Madsen	273	2013/2014 season (70%)	0	0	0	158	115
147	USA	Paige Rydberg	261	2015/2016 season (100%)	0	164	97	0	0
147	USA	Paige Rydberg	261	2014/2015 season (100%)	0	0	0	0	0
147	USA	Paige Rydberg	261	2013/2014 season (70%)	0	0	0	0	0
148	CAN	Larkyn Austman	253	2015/2016 season (100%)	0	0	0	0	0
148	CAN	Larkyn Austman	253	2014/2015 season (100%)	0	97	0	0	0
148	CAN	Larkyn Austman	253	2013/2014 season (70%)	72	84	0	0	0
149	SWE	Linnea Mellgren	250	2015/2016 season (100%)	0	0	0	250	0
149	SWE	Linnea Mellgren	250	2014/2015 season (100%)	0	0	0	0	0
149	SWE	Linnea Mellgren	250	2013/2014 season (70%)	0	0	0	0	0
150	KOR	Hwi Choi	247	2015/2016 season (100%)	0	0	0	0	0
150	KOR	Hwi Choi	247	2014/2015 season (100%)	0	120	0	0	0
150	KOR	Hwi Choi	247	2013/2014 season (70%)	0	0	0	127	0
151	TUR	Birce Atabey	242	2015/2016 season (100%)	0	0	0	0	0
151	TUR	Birce Atabey	242	2014/2015 season (100%)	0	0	0	0	0
151	TUR	Birce Atabey	242	2013/2014 season (70%)	0	0	0	127	115
151	RUS	Natalia Ogoreltseva	242	2015/2016 season (100%)	0	0	0	0	0
151	RUS	Natalia Ogoreltseva	242	2014/2015 season (100%)	0	0	0	0	0
151	RUS	Natalia Ogoreltseva	242	2013/2014 season (70%)	0	158	84	0	0
153	ITA	Guia Maria Tagliapietra	241	2015/2016 season (100%)	0	0	0	0	0
153	ITA	Guia Maria Tagliapietra	241	2014/2015 season (100%)	114	0	0	0	0
153	ITA	Guia Maria Tagliapietra	241	2013/2014 season (70%)	0	0	0	127	0
154	KOR	Song Joo Chea	237	2015/2016 season (100%)	0	0	0	0	0
154	KOR	Song Joo Chea	237	2014/2015 season (100%)	237	0	0	0	0
154	KOR	Song Joo Chea	237	2013/2014 season (70%)	0	0	0	0	0
155	KOR	Kyu Eun Kim	236	2015/2016 season (100%)	0	0	0	0	0
155	KOR	Kyu Eun Kim	236	2014/2015 season (100%)	0	0	0	160	0
155	KOR	Kyu Eun Kim	236	2013/2014 season (70%)	0	76	0	0	0
156	FIN	Anni Järvenpää	230	2015/2016 season (100%)	0	133	97	0	0
156	FIN	Anni Järvenpää	230	2014/2015 season (100%)	0	0	0	0	0
156	FIN	Anni Järvenpää	230	2013/2014 season (70%)	0	0	0	0	0
157	AUT	Lara Roth	225	2015/2016 season (100%)	0	0	0	225	0
157	AUT	Lara Roth	225	2014/2015 season (100%)	0	0	0	0	0
157	AUT	Lara Roth	225	2013/2014 season (70%)	0	0	0	0	0
158	UKR	Anastasia Kononenko	219	2015/2016 season (100%)	0	0	0	0	0
158	UKR	Anastasia Kononenko	219	2014/2015 season (100%)	0	0	0	219	0
158	UKR	Anastasia Kononenko	219	2013/2014 season (70%)	0	0	0	0	0
159	CAN	Kim Deguise Leveillee	217	2015/2016 season (100%)	0	0	0	0	0
159	CAN	Kim Deguise Leveillee	217	2014/2015 season (100%)	0	120	97	0	0
159	CAN	Kim Deguise Leveillee	217	2013/2014 season (70%)	0	0	0	0	0
160	KOR	Ha Nul Kim	215	2015/2016 season (100%)	215	0	0	0	0
160	KOR	Ha Nul Kim	215	2014/2015 season (100%)	0	0	0	0	0
160	KOR	Ha Nul Kim	215	2013/2014 season (70%)	0	0	0	0	0
161	IND	Ami Parekh	213	2015/2016 season (100%)	0	0	0	0	0
161	IND	Ami Parekh	213	2014/2015 season (100%)	0	0	0	0	0
161	IND	Ami Parekh	213	2013/2014 season (70%)	98	0	0	115	0
162	ITA	Lucrezia Gennaro	208	2015/2016 season (100%)	75	133	0	0	0
162	ITA	Lucrezia Gennaro	208	2014/2015 season (100%)	0	0	0	0	0
162	ITA	Lucrezia Gennaro	208	2013/2014 season (70%)	0	0	0	0	0
163	ESP	Marta Garcia	206	2015/2016 season (100%)	0	0	0	0	0
163	ESP	Marta Garcia	206	2014/2015 season (100%)	0	0	0	0	0
163	ESP	Marta Garcia	206	2013/2014 season (70%)	64	0	0	142	0
164	AUT	Sophie Almassy	203	2015/2016 season (100%)	0	0	0	0	0
164	AUT	Sophie Almassy	203	2014/2015 season (100%)	0	0	0	203	0
164	AUT	Sophie Almassy	203	2013/2014 season (70%)	0	0	0	0	0
164	ROU	Julia Sauter	203	2015/2016 season (100%)	0	0	0	0	0
164	ROU	Julia Sauter	203	2014/2015 season (100%)	0	0	0	203	0
164	ROU	Julia Sauter	203	2013/2014 season (70%)	0	0	0	0	0
164	TUR	Sıla Saygı	203	2015/2016 season (100%)	0	0	0	203	0
164	TUR	Sıla Saygı	203	2014/2015 season (100%)	0	0	0	0	0
164	TUR	Sıla Saygı	203	2013/2014 season (70%)	0	0	0	0	0
164	SUI	Yasmine Kimiko Yamada	203	2015/2016 season (100%)	0	0	0	203	0
164	SUI	Yasmine Kimiko Yamada	203	2014/2015 season (100%)	0	0	0	0	0
164	SUI	Yasmine Kimiko Yamada	203	2013/2014 season (70%)	0	0	0	0	0
164	ITA	Alessia Zardini	203	2015/2016 season (100%)	0	0	0	203	0
164	ITA	Alessia Zardini	203	2014/2015 season (100%)	0	0	0	0	0
164	ITA	Alessia Zardini	203	2013/2014 season (70%)	0	0	0	0	0
169	UKR	Anastasia Gozhva	201	2015/2016 season (100%)	93	108	0	0	0
169	UKR	Anastasia Gozhva	201	2014/2015 season (100%)	0	0	0	0	0
169	UKR	Anastasia Gozhva	201	2013/2014 season (70%)	0	0	0	0	0
170	EST	Jelizaveta Leonova	182	2015/2016 season (100%)	0	0	0	182	0
170	EST	Jelizaveta Leonova	182	2014/2015 season (100%)	0	0	0	0	0
170	EST	Jelizaveta Leonova	182	2013/2014 season (70%)	0	0	0	0	0
170	USA	Brynne McIsaac	182	2015/2016 season (100%)	0	182	0	0	0
170	USA	Brynne McIsaac	182	2014/2015 season (100%)	0	0	0	0	0
170	USA	Brynne McIsaac	182	2013/2014 season (70%)	0	0	0	0	0
170	ITA	Briley Pizzelanti	182	2015/2016 season (100%)	0	0	0	0	0
170	ITA	Briley Pizzelanti	182	2014/2015 season (100%)	0	0	0	182	0
170	ITA	Briley Pizzelanti	182	2013/2014 season (70%)	0	0	0	0	0
170	GBR	Zoe Wilkinson	182	2015/2016 season (100%)	0	0	0	182	0
170	GBR	Zoe Wilkinson	182	2014/2015 season (100%)	0	0	0	0	0
170	GBR	Zoe Wilkinson	182	2013/2014 season (70%)	0	0	0	0	0
170	USA	Maria Yang	182	2015/2016 season (100%)	0	0	0	182	0
170	USA	Maria Yang	182	2014/2015 season (100%)	0	0	0	0	0
170	USA	Maria Yang	182	2013/2014 season (70%)	0	0	0	0	0
175	FIN	Beata Papp	178	2015/2016 season (100%)	0	0	0	0	0
175	FIN	Beata Papp	178	2014/2015 season (100%)	0	0	0	178	0
175	FIN	Beata Papp	178	2013/2014 season (70%)	0	0	0	0	0
176	RUS	Valentina Chernishova	175	2015/2016 season (100%)	0	0	0	0	0
176	RUS	Valentina Chernishova	175	2014/2015 season (100%)	0	0	0	0	0
176	RUS	Valentina Chernishova	175	2013/2014 season (70%)	0	0	0	175	0
176	SWE	Rebecka Emanuelsson	175	2015/2016 season (100%)	0	0	0	0	0
176	SWE	Rebecka Emanuelsson	175	2014/2015 season (100%)	0	0	0	0	0
176	SWE	Rebecka Emanuelsson	175	2013/2014 season (70%)	0	0	0	175	0
178	KOR	So Yeon Im	164	2015/2016 season (100%)	0	0	0	164	0
178	KOR	So Yeon Im	164	2014/2015 season (100%)	0	0	0	0	0
178	KOR	So Yeon Im	164	2013/2014 season (70%)	0	0	0	0	0
178	AUT	Natalie Klotz	164	2015/2016 season (100%)	0	0	0	164	0
178	AUT	Natalie Klotz	164	2014/2015 season (100%)	0	0	0	0	0
178	AUT	Natalie Klotz	164	2013/2014 season (70%)	0	0	0	0	0
178	SLO	Ursa Krusec	164	2015/2016 season (100%)	0	0	0	164	0
178	SLO	Ursa Krusec	164	2014/2015 season (100%)	0	0	0	0	0
178	SLO	Ursa Krusec	164	2013/2014 season (70%)	0	0	0	0	0
178	FIN	Justiina Niemi	164	2015/2016 season (100%)	0	0	0	0	0
178	FIN	Justiina Niemi	164	2014/2015 season (100%)	0	0	0	164	0
178	FIN	Justiina Niemi	164	2013/2014 season (70%)	0	0	0	0	0
178	AUT	Alexandra Philippova	164	2015/2016 season (100%)	0	0	0	164	0
178	AUT	Alexandra Philippova	164	2014/2015 season (100%)	0	0	0	0	0
178	AUT	Alexandra Philippova	164	2013/2014 season (70%)	0	0	0	0	0
178	BUL	Daniela Stoeva	164	2015/2016 season (100%)	0	0	0	0	0
178	BUL	Daniela Stoeva	164	2014/2015 season (100%)	0	0	0	164	0
178	BUL	Daniela Stoeva	164	2013/2014 season (70%)	0	0	0	0	0
178	SLO	Pina Umek	164	2015/2016 season (100%)	0	0	0	0	0
178	SLO	Pina Umek	164	2014/2015 season (100%)	0	0	0	164	0
178	SLO	Pina Umek	164	2013/2014 season (70%)	0	0	0	0	0
178	BUL	Hristina Vassileva	164	2015/2016 season (100%)	0	0	0	164	0
178	BUL	Hristina Vassileva	164	2014/2015 season (100%)	0	0	0	0	0
178	BUL	Hristina Vassileva	164	2013/2014 season (70%)	0	0	0	0	0
186	ISR	Katarina Kulgeyko	160	2015/2016 season (100%)	0	0	0	160	0
186	ISR	Katarina Kulgeyko	160	2014/2015 season (100%)	0	0	0	0	0
186	ISR	Katarina Kulgeyko	160	2013/2014 season (70%)	0	0	0	0	0
186	USA	Ashley Shin	160	2015/2016 season (100%)	0	0	0	0	0
186	USA	Ashley Shin	160	2014/2015 season (100%)	0	0	0	160	0
186	USA	Ashley Shin	160	2013/2014 season (70%)	0	0	0	0	0
188	USA	Kiri Baga	158	2015/2016 season (100%)	0	0	0	0	0
188	USA	Kiri Baga	158	2014/2015 season (100%)	0	0	0	0	0
188	USA	Kiri Baga	158	2013/2014 season (70%)	0	0	0	158	0
188	NOR	Anine Rabe	158	2015/2016 season (100%)	0	0	0	0	0
188	NOR	Anine Rabe	158	2014/2015 season (100%)	0	0	0	0	0
188	NOR	Anine Rabe	158	2013/2014 season (70%)	0	0	0	158	0
190	SIN	Shuran Yu	152	2015/2016 season (100%)	0	0	0	0	0
190	SIN	Shuran Yu	152	2014/2015 season (100%)	44	108	0	0	0
190	SIN	Shuran Yu	152	2013/2014 season (70%)	0	0	0	0	0
191	SVK	Bronislava Dobiasova	149	2015/2016 season (100%)	0	0	0	0	0
191	SVK	Bronislava Dobiasova	149	2014/2015 season (100%)	0	0	0	0	0
191	SVK	Bronislava Dobiasova	149	2013/2014 season (70%)	34	0	0	115	0
192	USA	Emily Chan	148	2015/2016 season (100%)	0	148	0	0	0
192	USA	Emily Chan	148	2014/2015 season (100%)	0	0	0	0	0
192	USA	Emily Chan	148	2013/2014 season (70%)	0	0	0	0	0
192	FRA	Julie Froetscher	148	2015/2016 season (100%)	0	0	0	0	0
192	FRA	Julie Froetscher	148	2014/2015 season (100%)	0	148	0	0	0
192	FRA	Julie Froetscher	148	2013/2014 season (70%)	0	0	0	0	0
192	USA	Tessa Hong	148	2015/2016 season (100%)	0	148	0	0	0
192	USA	Tessa Hong	148	2014/2015 season (100%)	0	0	0	0	0
192	USA	Tessa Hong	148	2013/2014 season (70%)	0	0	0	0	0
192	JPN	Hina Takeno	148	2015/2016 season (100%)	0	0	0	0	0
192	JPN	Hina Takeno	148	2014/2015 season (100%)	0	148	0	0	0
192	JPN	Hina Takeno	148	2013/2014 season (70%)	0	0	0	0	0
192	JPN	Yuhana Yokoi	148	2015/2016 season (100%)	0	0	0	0	0
192	JPN	Yuhana Yokoi	148	2014/2015 season (100%)	0	148	0	0	0
192	JPN	Yuhana Yokoi	148	2013/2014 season (70%)	0	0	0	0	0
197	SIN	Chloe Ing	144	2015/2016 season (100%)	0	0	0	0	0
197	SIN	Chloe Ing	144	2014/2015 season (100%)	0	0	0	144	0
197	SIN	Chloe Ing	144	2013/2014 season (70%)	0	0	0	0	0
197	KAZ	Aiza Mambekova	144	2015/2016 season (100%)	0	0	0	144	0
197	KAZ	Aiza Mambekova	144	2014/2015 season (100%)	0	0	0	0	0
197	KAZ	Aiza Mambekova	144	2013/2014 season (70%)	0	0	0	0	0
197	SUI	Laure Nicodet	144	2015/2016 season (100%)	0	0	0	0	0
197	SUI	Laure Nicodet	144	2014/2015 season (100%)	0	0	0	144	0
197	SUI	Laure Nicodet	144	2013/2014 season (70%)	0	0	0	0	0
200	SUI	Myriam Leuenberger	142	2015/2016 season (100%)	0	0	0	0	0
200	SUI	Myriam Leuenberger	142	2014/2015 season (100%)	0	0	0	0	0
200	SUI	Myriam Leuenberger	142	2013/2014 season (70%)	0	0	0	142	0
201	CAN	Sarah Tamura	141	2015/2016 season (100%)	141	0	0	0	0
201	CAN	Sarah Tamura	141	2014/2015 season (100%)	0	0	0	0	0
201	CAN	Sarah Tamura	141	2013/2014 season (70%)	0	0	0	0	0
202	JPN	Yuna Aoki	133	2015/2016 season (100%)	0	133	0	0	0
202	JPN	Yuna Aoki	133	2014/2015 season (100%)	0	0	0	0	0
202	JPN	Yuna Aoki	133	2013/2014 season (70%)	0	0	0	0	0
202	FRA	Nadjma Mahamoud	133	2015/2016 season (100%)	0	0	0	0	0
202	FRA	Nadjma Mahamoud	133	2014/2015 season (100%)	0	133	0	0	0
202	FRA	Nadjma Mahamoud	133	2013/2014 season (70%)	0	0	0	0	0
202	JPN	Emiri Nagata	133	2015/2016 season (100%)	0	0	0	0	0
202	JPN	Emiri Nagata	133	2014/2015 season (100%)	0	133	0	0	0
202	JPN	Emiri Nagata	133	2013/2014 season (70%)	0	0	0	0	0
202	KOR	Se Bin Park	133	2015/2016 season (100%)	0	133	0	0	0
202	KOR	Se Bin Park	133	2014/2015 season (100%)	0	0	0	0	0
202	KOR	Se Bin Park	133	2013/2014 season (70%)	0	0	0	0	0
202	USA	Megan Wessenberg	133	2015/2016 season (100%)	0	133	0	0	0
202	USA	Megan Wessenberg	133	2014/2015 season (100%)	0	0	0	0	0
202	USA	Megan Wessenberg	133	2013/2014 season (70%)	0	0	0	0	0
207	ITA	Caterina Andermarcher	127	2015/2016 season (100%)	0	0	0	0	0
207	ITA	Caterina Andermarcher	127	2014/2015 season (100%)	0	0	0	0	0
207	ITA	Caterina Andermarcher	127	2013/2014 season (70%)	0	0	0	127	0
207	RUS	Svetlana Lebedava	127	2015/2016 season (100%)	0	0	0	0	0
207	RUS	Svetlana Lebedava	127	2014/2015 season (100%)	0	0	0	0	0
207	RUS	Svetlana Lebedava	127	2013/2014 season (70%)	0	0	0	127	0
207	BEL	Isabelle Pieman	127	2015/2016 season (100%)	0	0	0	0	0
207	BEL	Isabelle Pieman	127	2014/2015 season (100%)	0	0	0	0	0
207	BEL	Isabelle Pieman	127	2013/2014 season (70%)	0	0	0	127	0
210	CHN	Lu Zheng	126	2015/2016 season (100%)	126	0	0	0	0
210	CHN	Lu Zheng	126	2014/2015 season (100%)	0	0	0	0	0
210	CHN	Lu Zheng	126	2013/2014 season (70%)	0	0	0	0	0
211	LTU	Deimante Kizalaite	122	2015/2016 season (100%)	0	0	0	0	0
211	LTU	Deimante Kizalaite	122	2014/2015 season (100%)	83	0	0	0	0
211	LTU	Deimante Kizalaite	122	2013/2014 season (70%)	39	0	0	0	0
212	KOR	Tae Kyung Kim	121	2015/2016 season (100%)	0	0	0	0	0
212	KOR	Tae Kyung Kim	121	2014/2015 season (100%)	0	0	0	0	0
212	KOR	Tae Kyung Kim	121	2013/2014 season (70%)	121	0	0	0	0
213	KOR	Yu Jin Choi	120	2015/2016 season (100%)	0	120	0	0	0
213	KOR	Yu Jin Choi	120	2014/2015 season (100%)	0	0	0	0	0
213	KOR	Yu Jin Choi	120	2013/2014 season (70%)	0	0	0	0	0
213	USA	Akari Nakahara	120	2015/2016 season (100%)	0	120	0	0	0
213	USA	Akari Nakahara	120	2014/2015 season (100%)	0	0	0	0	0
213	USA	Akari Nakahara	120	2013/2014 season (70%)	0	0	0	0	0
215	SUI	Nicole Graf	115	2015/2016 season (100%)	0	0	0	0	0
215	SUI	Nicole Graf	115	2014/2015 season (100%)	0	0	0	0	0
215	SUI	Nicole Graf	115	2013/2014 season (70%)	0	0	0	115	0
215	USA	Vanessa Lam	115	2015/2016 season (100%)	0	0	0	0	0
215	USA	Vanessa Lam	115	2014/2015 season (100%)	0	0	0	0	0
215	USA	Vanessa Lam	115	2013/2014 season (70%)	0	0	0	115	0
215	BLR	Janina Makeenka	115	2015/2016 season (100%)	0	0	0	0	0
215	BLR	Janina Makeenka	115	2014/2015 season (100%)	0	0	0	0	0
215	BLR	Janina Makeenka	115	2013/2014 season (70%)	0	0	0	115	0
215	GER	Jennifer Parker	115	2015/2016 season (100%)	0	0	0	0	0
215	GER	Jennifer Parker	115	2014/2015 season (100%)	0	0	0	0	0
215	GER	Jennifer Parker	115	2013/2014 season (70%)	0	0	0	115	0
215	SRB	Mila Petrovic	115	2015/2016 season (100%)	0	0	0	0	0
215	SRB	Mila Petrovic	115	2014/2015 season (100%)	0	0	0	0	0
215	SRB	Mila Petrovic	115	2013/2014 season (70%)	0	0	0	115	0
220	NOR	Juni Marie Benjaminsen	110	2015/2016 season (100%)	55	0	0	0	0
220	NOR	Juni Marie Benjaminsen	110	2014/2015 season (100%)	55	0	0	0	0
220	NOR	Juni Marie Benjaminsen	110	2013/2014 season (70%)	0	0	0	0	0
221	UKR	Kim Cheremsky	108	2015/2016 season (100%)	0	108	0	0	0
221	UKR	Kim Cheremsky	108	2014/2015 season (100%)	0	0	0	0	0
221	UKR	Kim Cheremsky	108	2013/2014 season (70%)	0	0	0	0	0
221	CAN	Kim Decelles	108	2015/2016 season (100%)	0	108	0	0	0
221	CAN	Kim Decelles	108	2014/2015 season (100%)	0	0	0	0	0
221	CAN	Kim Decelles	108	2013/2014 season (70%)	0	0	0	0	0
221	SWE	Anita Östlund	108	2015/2016 season (100%)	0	108	0	0	0
221	SWE	Anita Östlund	108	2014/2015 season (100%)	0	0	0	0	0
221	SWE	Anita Östlund	108	2013/2014 season (70%)	0	0	0	0	0
221	USA	Nina Ouellette	108	2015/2016 season (100%)	0	108	0	0	0
221	USA	Nina Ouellette	108	2014/2015 season (100%)	0	0	0	0	0
221	USA	Nina Ouellette	108	2013/2014 season (70%)	0	0	0	0	0
221	FIN	Emmi Peltonen	108	2015/2016 season (100%)	0	0	0	0	0
221	FIN	Emmi Peltonen	108	2014/2015 season (100%)	0	108	0	0	0
221	FIN	Emmi Peltonen	108	2013/2014 season (70%)	0	0	0	0	0
226	CAN	Madelyn Dunley	104	2015/2016 season (100%)	0	0	0	0	0
226	CAN	Madelyn Dunley	104	2014/2015 season (100%)	0	0	0	0	0
226	CAN	Madelyn Dunley	104	2013/2014 season (70%)	0	104	0	0	0
226	USA	Yasmin Siraj	104	2015/2016 season (100%)	0	0	0	0	0
226	USA	Yasmin Siraj	104	2014/2015 season (100%)	0	0	0	0	0
226	USA	Yasmin Siraj	104	2013/2014 season (70%)	0	104	0	0	0
228	AUS	Katie Pasfield	102	2015/2016 season (100%)	102	0	0	0	0
228	AUS	Katie Pasfield	102	2014/2015 season (100%)	0	0	0	0	0
228	AUS	Katie Pasfield	102	2013/2014 season (70%)	0	0	0	0	0
229	LTU	Inga Janulevičiūtė	98	2015/2016 season (100%)	0	0	0	0	0
229	LTU	Inga Janulevičiūtė	98	2014/2015 season (100%)	0	0	0	0	0
229	LTU	Inga Janulevičiūtė	98	2013/2014 season (70%)	98	0	0	0	0
230	KOR	Hee Soo Cho	97	2015/2016 season (100%)	0	97	0	0	0
230	KOR	Hee Soo Cho	97	2014/2015 season (100%)	0	0	0	0	0
230	KOR	Hee Soo Cho	97	2013/2014 season (70%)	0	0	0	0	0
230	ISR	Netta Schreiber	97	2015/2016 season (100%)	0	0	0	0	0
230	ISR	Netta Schreiber	97	2014/2015 season (100%)	0	97	0	0	0
230	ISR	Netta Schreiber	97	2013/2014 season (70%)	0	0	0	0	0
232	THA	Thita Lamsam	92	2015/2016 season (100%)	92	0	0	0	0
232	THA	Thita Lamsam	92	2014/2015 season (100%)	0	0	0	0	0
232	THA	Thita Lamsam	92	2013/2014 season (70%)	0	0	0	0	0
233	AUS	Chantelle Kerry	84	2015/2016 season (100%)	0	0	0	0	0
233	AUS	Chantelle Kerry	84	2014/2015 season (100%)	0	0	0	0	0
233	AUS	Chantelle Kerry	84	2013/2014 season (70%)	0	84	0	0	0
234	NED	Kyarha Van Tiel	83	2015/2016 season (100%)	83	0	0	0	0
234	NED	Kyarha Van Tiel	83	2014/2015 season (100%)	0	0	0	0	0
234	NED	Kyarha Van Tiel	83	2013/2014 season (70%)	0	0	0	0	0
235	TPE	Crystal Kiang	79	2015/2016 season (100%)	0	0	0	0	0
235	TPE	Crystal Kiang	79	2014/2015 season (100%)	0	0	0	0	0
235	TPE	Crystal Kiang	79	2013/2014 season (70%)	79	0	0	0	0
235	BEL	Kaat Van Daele	79	2015/2016 season (100%)	0	0	0	0	0
235	BEL	Kaat Van Daele	79	2014/2015 season (100%)	0	0	0	0	0
235	BEL	Kaat Van Daele	79	2013/2014 season (70%)	79	0	0	0	0
237	CAN	Julianne Delaurier	76	2015/2016 season (100%)	0	0	0	0	0
237	CAN	Julianne Delaurier	76	2014/2015 season (100%)	0	0	0	0	0
237	CAN	Julianne Delaurier	76	2013/2014 season (70%)	0	76	0	0	0
237	CAN	Sandrine Martin	76	2015/2016 season (100%)	0	0	0	0	0
237	CAN	Sandrine Martin	76	2014/2015 season (100%)	0	0	0	0	0
237	CAN	Sandrine Martin	76	2013/2014 season (70%)	0	76	0	0	0
239	RSA	Lejeanne Marais	71	2015/2016 season (100%)	0	0	0	0	0
239	RSA	Lejeanne Marais	71	2014/2015 season (100%)	0	0	0	0	0
239	RSA	Lejeanne Marais	71	2013/2014 season (70%)	71	0	0	0	0
240	GER	Maria-Katharina Herceg	68	2015/2016 season (100%)	0	0	0	0	0
240	GER	Maria-Katharina Herceg	68	2014/2015 season (100%)	0	0	0	0	0
240	GER	Maria-Katharina Herceg	68	2013/2014 season (70%)	0	68	0	0	0
240	FRA	Lea Serna	68	2015/2016 season (100%)	0	0	0	0	0
240	FRA	Lea Serna	68	2014/2015 season (100%)	68	0	0	0	0
240	FRA	Lea Serna	68	2013/2014 season (70%)	0	0	0	0	0
242	FRA	Alizee Crozet	61	2015/2016 season (100%)	61	0	0	0	0
242	FRA	Alizee Crozet	61	2014/2015 season (100%)	0	0	0	0	0
242	FRA	Alizee Crozet	61	2013/2014 season (70%)	0	0	0	0	0
243	SUI	Matilde Gianocca	43	2015/2016 season (100%)	0	0	0	0	0
243	SUI	Matilde Gianocca	43	2014/2015 season (100%)	0	0	0	0	0
243	SUI	Matilde Gianocca	43	2013/2014 season (70%)	43	0	0	0	0

==== Pairs (96 couples) ====
As of 2 April 2016

Rank	Nation	Couple	Points	Season	ISU Championships or Olympics	(Junior) Grand Prix and Final		Selected International Competition	
Rank	Nation	Couple	Points	Season	Best	Best	2nd Best	Best	2nd Best
1	CAN	Meagan Duhamel / Eric Radford	5020	2015/2016 season (100%)	1200	720	400	0	0
1	CAN	Meagan Duhamel / Eric Radford	5020	2014/2015 season (100%)	1200	800	400	300	0
1	CAN	Meagan Duhamel / Eric Radford	5020	2013/2014 season (70%)	680	368	252	0	0
2	RUS	Ksenia Stolbova / Fedor Klimov	4426	2015/2016 season (100%)	875	800	400	300	0
2	RUS	Ksenia Stolbova / Fedor Klimov	4426	2014/2015 season (100%)	756	720	400	0	0
2	RUS	Ksenia Stolbova / Fedor Klimov	4426	2013/2014 season (70%)	756	227	204	175	0
3	CHN	Wenjing Sui / Cong Han	3928	2015/2016 season (100%)	1080	400	360	0	0
3	CHN	Wenjing Sui / Cong Han	3928	2014/2015 season (100%)	1080	648	360	0	0
3	CHN	Wenjing Sui / Cong Han	3928	2013/2014 season (70%)	588	252	227	0	0
4	USA	Alexa Scimeca / Chris Knierim	3775	2015/2016 season (100%)	756	360	324	300	270
4	USA	Alexa Scimeca / Chris Knierim	3775	2014/2015 season (100%)	638	292	292	300	243
4	USA	Alexa Scimeca / Chris Knierim	3775	2013/2014 season (70%)	476	183	165	142	0
5	RUS	Evgenia Tarasova / Vladimir Morozov	3566	2015/2016 season (100%)	787	360	213	300	243
5	RUS	Evgenia Tarasova / Vladimir Morozov	3566	2014/2015 season (100%)	709	360	324	270	0
5	RUS	Evgenia Tarasova / Vladimir Morozov	3566	2013/2014 season (70%)	315	178	158	0	0
6	RUS	Yuko Kavaguti / Alexander Smirnov	3360	2015/2016 season (100%)	0	648	400	300	0
6	RUS	Yuko Kavaguti / Alexander Smirnov	3360	2014/2015 season (100%)	840	472	400	300	0
6	RUS	Yuko Kavaguti / Alexander Smirnov	3360	2013/2014 season (70%)	0	0	0	0	0
7	RUS	Tatiana Volosozhar / Maxim Trankov	3339	2015/2016 season (100%)	840	400	0	300	0
7	RUS	Tatiana Volosozhar / Maxim Trankov	3339	2014/2015 season (100%)	0	0	0	0	0
7	RUS	Tatiana Volosozhar / Maxim Trankov	3339	2013/2014 season (70%)	840	504	280	175	0
8	CHN	Cheng Peng / Hao Zhang	3289	2015/2016 season (100%)	377	472	324	0	0
8	CHN	Cheng Peng / Hao Zhang	3289	2014/2015 season (100%)	875	583	400	0	0
8	CHN	Cheng Peng / Hao Zhang	3289	2013/2014 season (70%)	551	408	252	0	0
9	FRA	Vanessa James / Morgan Ciprès	2970	2015/2016 season (100%)	612	360	236	243	225
9	FRA	Vanessa James / Morgan Ciprès	2970	2014/2015 season (100%)	551	262	262	219	0
9	FRA	Vanessa James / Morgan Ciprès	2970	2013/2014 season (70%)	386	183	0	0	0
10	CHN	Xiaoyu Yu / Yang Jin	2950	2015/2016 season (100%)	680	525	360	0	0
10	CHN	Xiaoyu Yu / Yang Jin	2950	2014/2015 season (100%)	500	525	360	0	0
10	CHN	Xiaoyu Yu / Yang Jin	2950	2013/2014 season (70%)	350	245	175	0	0
11	ITA	Nicole Della Monica / Matteo Guarise	2899	2015/2016 season (100%)	496	262	0	270	243
11	ITA	Nicole Della Monica / Matteo Guarise	2899	2014/2015 season (100%)	496	262	236	250	250
11	ITA	Nicole Della Monica / Matteo Guarise	2899	2013/2014 season (70%)	281	134	0	115	0
12	USA	Tarah Kayne / Danny O'Shea	2597	2015/2016 season (100%)	612	292	236	300	243
12	USA	Tarah Kayne / Danny O'Shea	2597	2014/2015 season (100%)	402	0	0	243	0
12	USA	Tarah Kayne / Danny O'Shea	2597	2013/2014 season (70%)	529	0	0	142	142
13	USA	Haven Denney / Brandon Frazier	2589	2015/2016 season (100%)	0	0	0	0	0
13	USA	Haven Denney / Brandon Frazier	2589	2014/2015 season (100%)	446	360	292	300	270
13	USA	Haven Denney / Brandon Frazier	2589	2013/2014 season (70%)	428	183	183	127	0
14	RUS	Kristina Astakhova / Alexei Rogonov	2550	2015/2016 season (100%)	446	262	213	270	270
14	RUS	Kristina Astakhova / Alexei Rogonov	2550	2014/2015 season (100%)	465	324	0	300	0
14	RUS	Kristina Astakhova / Alexei Rogonov	2550	2013/2014 season (70%)	0	0	0	0	0
15	AUT	Miriam Ziegler / Severin Kiefer	2430	2015/2016 season (100%)	362	236	191	225	198
15	AUT	Miriam Ziegler / Severin Kiefer	2430	2014/2015 season (100%)	402	191	191	270	164
15	AUT	Miriam Ziegler / Severin Kiefer	2430	2013/2014 season (70%)	185	0	0	127	127
16	CHN	Qing Pang / Jian Tong	2319	2015/2016 season (100%)	0	0	0	0	0
16	CHN	Qing Pang / Jian Tong	2319	2014/2015 season (100%)	972	0	0	0	0
16	CHN	Qing Pang / Jian Tong	2319	2013/2014 season (70%)	613	454	280	0	0
17	CAN	Julianne Séguin / Charlie Bilodeau	2279	2015/2016 season (100%)	0	583	324	198	0
17	CAN	Julianne Séguin / Charlie Bilodeau	2279	2014/2015 season (100%)	574	350	250	0	0
17	CAN	Julianne Séguin / Charlie Bilodeau	2279	2013/2014 season (70%)	0	127	127	0	0
18	ITA	Valentina Marchei / Ondrej Hotárek	2169	2015/2016 season (100%)	551	236	0	250	250
18	ITA	Valentina Marchei / Ondrej Hotárek	2169	2014/2015 season (100%)	612	0	0	270	0
18	ITA	Valentina Marchei / Ondrej Hotárek	2169	2013/2014 season (70%)	0	0	0	0	0
19	CAN	Kirsten Moore-Towers / Michael Marinaro	2165	2015/2016 season (100%)	574	324	213	243	0
19	CAN	Kirsten Moore-Towers / Michael Marinaro	2165	2014/2015 season (100%)	362	236	213	0	0
19	CAN	Kirsten Moore-Towers / Michael Marinaro	2165	2013/2014 season (70%)	0	0	0	0	0
20	RUS	Vera Bazarova / Andrei Deputat	1856	2015/2016 season (100%)	0	292	262	250	0
20	RUS	Vera Bazarova / Andrei Deputat	1856	2014/2015 season (100%)	0	292	292	243	225
20	RUS	Vera Bazarova / Andrei Deputat	1856	2013/2014 season (70%)	0	0	0	0	0
21	CAN	Lubov Iliushechkina / Dylan Moscovitch	1828	2015/2016 season (100%)	638	262	213	219	0
21	CAN	Lubov Iliushechkina / Dylan Moscovitch	1828	2014/2015 season (100%)	496	0	0	0	0
21	CAN	Lubov Iliushechkina / Dylan Moscovitch	1828	2013/2014 season (70%)	0	0	0	0	0
22	RUS	Lina Fedorova / Maxim Miroshkin	1777	2015/2016 season (100%)	0	0	0	0	0
22	RUS	Lina Fedorova / Maxim Miroshkin	1777	2014/2015 season (100%)	405	315	225	300	0
22	RUS	Lina Fedorova / Maxim Miroshkin	1777	2013/2014 season (70%)	0	199	175	158	0
23	CAN	Vanessa Grenier / Maxime Deschamps	1657	2015/2016 season (100%)	402	213	191	219	0
23	CAN	Vanessa Grenier / Maxime Deschamps	1657	2014/2015 season (100%)	0	236	0	198	198
23	CAN	Vanessa Grenier / Maxime Deschamps	1657	2013/2014 season (70%)	0	0	0	0	0
24	USA	Jessica Calalang / Zack Sidhu	1578	2015/2016 season (100%)	0	213	0	219	0
24	USA	Jessica Calalang / Zack Sidhu	1578	2014/2015 season (100%)	0	262	213	270	243
24	USA	Jessica Calalang / Zack Sidhu	1578	2013/2014 season (70%)	0	0	0	158	0
25	GER	Aliona Savchenko / Bruno Massot	1572	2015/2016 season (100%)	972	0	0	300	300
25	GER	Aliona Savchenko / Bruno Massot	1572	2014/2015 season (100%)	0	0	0	0	0
25	GER	Aliona Savchenko / Bruno Massot	1572	2013/2014 season (70%)	0	0	0	0	0
26	ITA	Bianca Manacorda / Niccolo Macii	1516	2015/2016 season (100%)	295	0	0	198	0
26	ITA	Bianca Manacorda / Niccolo Macii	1516	2014/2015 season (100%)	157	120	108	270	182
26	ITA	Bianca Manacorda / Niccolo Macii	1516	2013/2014 season (70%)	0	93	93	0	0
27	USA	Madeline Aaron / Max Settlage	1510	2015/2016 season (100%)	0	0	0	198	0
27	USA	Madeline Aaron / Max Settlage	1510	2014/2015 season (100%)	0	292	262	243	0
27	USA	Madeline Aaron / Max Settlage	1510	2013/2014 season (70%)	230	158	127	0	0
28	CZE	Anna Dušková / Martin Bidař	1503	2015/2016 season (100%)	500	315	225	0	0
28	CZE	Anna Dušková / Martin Bidař	1503	2014/2015 season (100%)	239	120	97	0	0
28	CZE	Anna Dušková / Martin Bidař	1503	2013/2014 season (70%)	136	104	84	0	0
29	USA	Marissa Castelli / Mervin Tran	1492	2015/2016 season (100%)	496	292	236	270	198
29	USA	Marissa Castelli / Mervin Tran	1492	2014/2015 season (100%)	0	0	0	0	0
29	USA	Marissa Castelli / Mervin Tran	1492	2013/2014 season (70%)	0	0	0	0	0
30	CHN	Xuehan Wang / Lei Wang	1477	2015/2016 season (100%)	275	292	262	0	0
30	CHN	Xuehan Wang / Lei Wang	1477	2014/2015 season (100%)	0	324	324	0	0
30	CHN	Xuehan Wang / Lei Wang	1477	2013/2014 season (70%)	0	204	0	0	0
31	RUS	Anastasia Gubanova / Alexei Sintsov	1429	2015/2016 season (100%)	174	255	250	0	0
31	RUS	Anastasia Gubanova / Alexei Sintsov	1429	2014/2015 season (100%)	365	203	182	0	0
31	RUS	Anastasia Gubanova / Alexei Sintsov	1429	2013/2014 season (70%)	0	0	0	0	0
32	GBR	Amani Fancy / Christopher Boyadji	1336	2015/2016 season (100%)	0	191	0	243	0
32	GBR	Amani Fancy / Christopher Boyadji	1336	2014/2015 season (100%)	264	0	0	250	0
32	GBR	Amani Fancy / Christopher Boyadji	1336	2013/2014 season (70%)	134	0	0	127	127
33	USA	Chelsea Liu / Brian Johnson	1288	2015/2016 season (100%)	328	164	120	0	0
33	USA	Chelsea Liu / Brian Johnson	1288	2014/2015 season (100%)	266	207	203	0	0
33	USA	Chelsea Liu / Brian Johnson	1288	2013/2014 season (70%)	0	0	0	0	0
34	RUS	Maria Vigalova / Egor Zakroev	1214	2015/2016 season (100%)	0	0	0	0	0
34	RUS	Maria Vigalova / Egor Zakroev	1214	2014/2015 season (100%)	0	284	250	0	0
34	RUS	Maria Vigalova / Egor Zakroev	1214	2013/2014 season (70%)	284	221	175	0	0
35	UKR	Renata Oganesian / Mark Bardei	1212	2015/2016 season (100%)	365	250	230	0	0
35	UKR	Renata Oganesian / Mark Bardei	1212	2014/2015 season (100%)	0	203	164	0	0
35	UKR	Renata Oganesian / Mark Bardei	1212	2013/2014 season (70%)	0	0	0	0	0
36	GER	Mari Vartmann / Ruben Blommaert	1178	2015/2016 season (100%)	402	236	0	270	270
36	GER	Mari Vartmann / Ruben Blommaert	1178	2014/2015 season (100%)	0	0	0	0	0
36	GER	Mari Vartmann / Ruben Blommaert	1178	2013/2014 season (70%)	0	0	0	0	0
37	GER	Minerva Fabienne Hase / Nolan Seegert	1106	2015/2016 season (100%)	0	0	0	225	182
37	GER	Minerva Fabienne Hase / Nolan Seegert	1106	2014/2015 season (100%)	293	0	0	203	203
37	GER	Minerva Fabienne Hase / Nolan Seegert	1106	2013/2014 season (70%)	0	0	0	0	0
38	RUS	Ekaterina Borisova / Dmitry Sopot	1005	2015/2016 season (100%)	405	350	250	0	0
38	RUS	Ekaterina Borisova / Dmitry Sopot	1005	2014/2015 season (100%)	0	0	0	0	0
38	RUS	Ekaterina Borisova / Dmitry Sopot	1005	2013/2014 season (70%)	0	0	0	0	0
39	BLR	Tatiana Danilova / Mikalai Kamianchuk	967	2015/2016 season (100%)	325	0	0	219	198
39	BLR	Tatiana Danilova / Mikalai Kamianchuk	967	2014/2015 season (100%)	0	0	0	225	0
39	BLR	Tatiana Danilova / Mikalai Kamianchuk	967	2013/2014 season (70%)	0	0	0	0	0
40	GBR	Caitlin Yankowskas / Hamish Gaman	921	2015/2016 season (100%)	0	0	0	0	0
40	GBR	Caitlin Yankowskas / Hamish Gaman	921	2014/2015 season (100%)	362	0	0	225	219
40	GBR	Caitlin Yankowskas / Hamish Gaman	921	2013/2014 season (70%)	0	0	0	115	0
41	RUS	Arina Cherniavskaia / Antonino Souza-Kordyeru	902	2015/2016 season (100%)	0	0	0	219	0
41	RUS	Arina Cherniavskaia / Antonino Souza-Kordyeru	902	2014/2015 season (100%)	0	191	0	219	0
41	RUS	Arina Cherniavskaia / Antonino Souza-Kordyeru	902	2013/2014 season (70%)	0	158	115	0	0
42	RUS	Julia Antipova / Nodari Maisuradze	887	2015/2016 season (100%)	0	0	0	0	0
42	RUS	Julia Antipova / Nodari Maisuradze	887	2014/2015 season (100%)	0	0	0	0	0
42	RUS	Julia Antipova / Nodari Maisuradze	887	2013/2014 season (70%)	402	183	0	175	127
43	PRK	Tae Ok Ryom / Ju Sik Kim	847	2015/2016 season (100%)	446	0	0	203	198
43	PRK	Tae Ok Ryom / Ju Sik Kim	847	2014/2015 season (100%)	0	0	0	0	0
43	PRK	Tae Ok Ryom / Ju Sik Kim	847	2013/2014 season (70%)	0	0	0	0	0
44	LTU	Goda Butkutė / Nikita Ermolaev	779	2015/2016 season (100%)	293	0	0	243	243
44	LTU	Goda Butkutė / Nikita Ermolaev	779	2014/2015 season (100%)	0	0	0	0	0
44	LTU	Goda Butkutė / Nikita Ermolaev	779	2013/2014 season (70%)	0	0	0	0	0
45	CAN	Mary Orr / Phelan Simpson	775	2015/2016 season (100%)	0	0	0	0	0
45	CAN	Mary Orr / Phelan Simpson	775	2014/2015 season (100%)	194	148	133	0	0
45	CAN	Mary Orr / Phelan Simpson	775	2013/2014 season (70%)	207	93	0	0	0
46	USA	Lindsay Weinstein / Jacob Simon	753	2015/2016 season (100%)	215	133	108	0	0
46	USA	Lindsay Weinstein / Jacob Simon	753	2014/2015 season (100%)	0	164	133	0	0
46	USA	Lindsay Weinstein / Jacob Simon	753	2013/2014 season (70%)	0	0	0	0	0
47	RUS	Natalia Zabiiako / Alexander Enbert	751	2015/2016 season (100%)	0	262	0	270	219
47	RUS	Natalia Zabiiako / Alexander Enbert	751	2014/2015 season (100%)	0	0	0	0	0
47	RUS	Natalia Zabiiako / Alexander Enbert	751	2013/2014 season (70%)	0	0	0	0	0
48	RUS	Daria Beklemisheva / Maxim Bobrov	654	2015/2016 season (100%)	0	0	0	0	0
48	RUS	Daria Beklemisheva / Maxim Bobrov	654	2014/2015 season (100%)	174	255	225	0	0
48	RUS	Daria Beklemisheva / Maxim Bobrov	654	2013/2014 season (70%)	0	0	0	0	0
49	FRA	Lola Esbrat / Andrei Novoselov	653	2015/2016 season (100%)	247	0	0	203	203
49	FRA	Lola Esbrat / Andrei Novoselov	653	2014/2015 season (100%)	0	0	0	0	0
49	FRA	Lola Esbrat / Andrei Novoselov	653	2013/2014 season (70%)	0	0	0	0	0
50	BLR	Maria Paliakova / Nikita Bochkov	633	2015/2016 season (100%)	0	0	0	0	0
50	BLR	Maria Paliakova / Nikita Bochkov	633	2014/2015 season (100%)	214	0	0	0	0
50	BLR	Maria Paliakova / Nikita Bochkov	633	2013/2014 season (70%)	150	0	0	142	127
51	RUS	Anastasia Mishina / Vladislav Mirzoev	614	2015/2016 season (100%)	450	164	0	0	0
51	RUS	Anastasia Mishina / Vladislav Mirzoev	614	2014/2015 season (100%)	0	0	0	0	0
51	RUS	Anastasia Mishina / Vladislav Mirzoev	614	2013/2014 season (70%)	0	0	0	0	0
52	JPN	Sumire Suto / Francis Boudreau Audet	612	2015/2016 season (100%)	362	0	0	250	0
52	JPN	Sumire Suto / Francis Boudreau Audet	612	2014/2015 season (100%)	0	0	0	0	0
52	JPN	Sumire Suto / Francis Boudreau Audet	612	2013/2014 season (70%)	0	0	0	0	0
53	CAN	Bryn Hoffman / Bryce Chudak	603	2015/2016 season (100%)	239	182	182	0	0
53	CAN	Bryn Hoffman / Bryce Chudak	603	2014/2015 season (100%)	0	0	0	0	0
53	CAN	Bryn Hoffman / Bryce Chudak	603	2013/2014 season (70%)	0	0	0	0	0
54	USA	Caydee Denney / John Coughlin	589	2015/2016 season (100%)	0	0	0	0	0
54	USA	Caydee Denney / John Coughlin	589	2014/2015 season (100%)	0	0	0	0	0
54	USA	Caydee Denney / John Coughlin	589	2013/2014 season (70%)	0	227	204	158	0
55	FRA	Camille Mendoza / Pavel Kovalev	588	2015/2016 season (100%)	0	0	0	203	203
55	FRA	Camille Mendoza / Pavel Kovalev	588	2014/2015 season (100%)	0	0	0	182	0
55	FRA	Camille Mendoza / Pavel Kovalev	588	2013/2014 season (70%)	0	0	0	0	0
56	CAN	Justine Brasseur / Mathieu Ostiguy	578	2015/2016 season (100%)	266	164	148	0	0
56	CAN	Justine Brasseur / Mathieu Ostiguy	578	2014/2015 season (100%)	0	0	0	0	0
56	CAN	Justine Brasseur / Mathieu Ostiguy	578	2013/2014 season (70%)	0	0	0	0	0
57	USA	Joy Weinberg / Maximiliano Fernandez	552	2015/2016 season (100%)	194	225	133	0	0
57	USA	Joy Weinberg / Maximiliano Fernandez	552	2014/2015 season (100%)	0	0	0	0	0
57	USA	Joy Weinberg / Maximiliano Fernandez	552	2013/2014 season (70%)	0	0	0	0	0
58	RUS	Amina Atakhanova / Ilia Spiridonov	534	2015/2016 season (100%)	0	284	250	0	0
58	RUS	Amina Atakhanova / Ilia Spiridonov	534	2014/2015 season (100%)	0	0	0	0	0
58	RUS	Amina Atakhanova / Ilia Spiridonov	534	2013/2014 season (70%)	0	0	0	0	0
59	SUI	Alexandra Herbrikova / Nicolas Roulet	519	2015/2016 season (100%)	173	0	0	182	0
59	SUI	Alexandra Herbrikova / Nicolas Roulet	519	2014/2015 season (100%)	0	0	0	164	0
59	SUI	Alexandra Herbrikova / Nicolas Roulet	519	2013/2014 season (70%)	0	0	0	0	0
60	CAN	Natasha Purich / Andrew Wolfe	455	2015/2016 season (100%)	0	0	0	0	0
60	CAN	Natasha Purich / Andrew Wolfe	455	2014/2015 season (100%)	0	236	0	219	0
60	CAN	Natasha Purich / Andrew Wolfe	455	2013/2014 season (70%)	0	0	0	0	0
61	USA	Gretchen Donlan / Nathan Bartholomay	448	2015/2016 season (100%)	0	0	0	198	0
61	USA	Gretchen Donlan / Nathan Bartholomay	448	2014/2015 season (100%)	0	0	0	250	0
61	USA	Gretchen Donlan / Nathan Bartholomay	448	2013/2014 season (70%)	0	0	0	0	0
62	CAN	Brittany Jones / Joshua Reagan	432	2015/2016 season (100%)	0	0	0	0	0
62	CAN	Brittany Jones / Joshua Reagan	432	2014/2015 season (100%)	0	213	0	219	0
62	CAN	Brittany Jones / Joshua Reagan	432	2013/2014 season (70%)	0	0	0	0	0
62	RUS	Anastasia Poluianova / Stepan Korotkov	432	2015/2016 season (100%)	0	225	207	0	0
62	RUS	Anastasia Poluianova / Stepan Korotkov	432	2014/2015 season (100%)	0	0	0	0	0
62	RUS	Anastasia Poluianova / Stepan Korotkov	432	2013/2014 season (70%)	0	0	0	0	0
64	ISR	Adel Tankova / Evgeni Krasnopolski	419	2015/2016 season (100%)	237	0	0	182	0
64	ISR	Adel Tankova / Evgeni Krasnopolski	419	2014/2015 season (100%)	0	0	0	0	0
64	ISR	Adel Tankova / Evgeni Krasnopolski	419	2013/2014 season (70%)	0	0	0	0	0
65	SUI	Ioulia Chtchetinina / Noah Scherer	367	2015/2016 season (100%)	0	0	0	203	164
65	SUI	Ioulia Chtchetinina / Noah Scherer	367	2014/2015 season (100%)	0	0	0	0	0
65	SUI	Ioulia Chtchetinina / Noah Scherer	367	2013/2014 season (70%)	0	0	0	0	0
66	ESP	Marcelina Lech / Aritz Maestu	356	2015/2016 season (100%)	192	0	0	0	0
66	ESP	Marcelina Lech / Aritz Maestu	356	2014/2015 season (100%)	0	0	0	164	0
66	ESP	Marcelina Lech / Aritz Maestu	356	2013/2014 season (70%)	0	0	0	0	0
67	RUS	Elena Ivanova / Tagir Khakimov	351	2015/2016 season (100%)	0	203	148	0	0
67	RUS	Elena Ivanova / Tagir Khakimov	351	2014/2015 season (100%)	0	0	0	0	0
67	RUS	Elena Ivanova / Tagir Khakimov	351	2013/2014 season (70%)	0	0	0	0	0
68	CAN	Shalena Rau / Sebastian Arcieri	348	2015/2016 season (100%)	0	0	0	0	0
68	CAN	Shalena Rau / Sebastian Arcieri	348	2014/2015 season (100%)	215	133	0	0	0
68	CAN	Shalena Rau / Sebastian Arcieri	348	2013/2014 season (70%)	0	0	0	0	0
69	CRO	Lana Petranovic / Michael Lueck	346	2015/2016 season (100%)	0	0	0	182	164
69	CRO	Lana Petranovic / Michael Lueck	346	2014/2015 season (100%)	0	0	0	0	0
69	CRO	Lana Petranovic / Michael Lueck	346	2013/2014 season (70%)	0	0	0	0	0
70	USA	Caitlin Fields / Ernie Utah Stevens	328	2015/2016 season (100%)	0	0	0	0	0
70	USA	Caitlin Fields / Ernie Utah Stevens	328	2014/2015 season (100%)	328	0	0	0	0
70	USA	Caitlin Fields / Ernie Utah Stevens	328	2013/2014 season (70%)	0	0	0	0	0
71	RUS	Maria Chuzhanova / Denis Mintsev	312	2015/2016 season (100%)	0	0	0	0	0
71	RUS	Maria Chuzhanova / Denis Mintsev	312	2014/2015 season (100%)	0	164	148	0	0
71	RUS	Maria Chuzhanova / Denis Mintsev	312	2013/2014 season (70%)	0	0	0	0	0
71	CAN	Hope McLean / Trennt Michaud	312	2015/2016 season (100%)	0	148	0	0	0
71	CAN	Hope McLean / Trennt Michaud	312	2014/2015 season (100%)	0	164	0	0	0
71	CAN	Hope McLean / Trennt Michaud	312	2013/2014 season (70%)	0	0	0	0	0
71	CHN	Wenting Wang / Yan Zhang	312	2015/2016 season (100%)	0	0	0	0	0
71	CHN	Wenting Wang / Yan Zhang	312	2014/2015 season (100%)	0	0	0	0	0
71	CHN	Wenting Wang / Yan Zhang	312	2013/2014 season (70%)	312	0	0	0	0
74	TUR	Olga Beständigová / İlhan Mansız	279	2015/2016 season (100%)	0	0	0	0	0
74	TUR	Olga Beständigová / İlhan Mansız	279	2014/2015 season (100%)	0	0	0	164	0
74	TUR	Olga Beständigová / İlhan Mansız	279	2013/2014 season (70%)	0	0	0	115	0
75	GBR	Chloe Curtin / Steven Adcock	277	2015/2016 season (100%)	157	120	0	0	0
75	GBR	Chloe Curtin / Steven Adcock	277	2014/2015 season (100%)	0	0	0	0	0
75	GBR	Chloe Curtin / Steven Adcock	277	2013/2014 season (70%)	0	0	0	0	0
76	CHN	Ying Zhao / Zhong Xie	253	2015/2016 season (100%)	0	133	120	0	0
76	CHN	Ying Zhao / Zhong Xie	253	2014/2015 season (100%)	0	0	0	0	0
76	CHN	Ying Zhao / Zhong Xie	253	2013/2014 season (70%)	0	0	0	0	0
77	RUS	Alisa Efimova / Alexander Korovin	225	2015/2016 season (100%)	0	0	0	225	0
77	RUS	Alisa Efimova / Alexander Korovin	225	2014/2015 season (100%)	0	0	0	0	0
77	RUS	Alisa Efimova / Alexander Korovin	225	2013/2014 season (70%)	0	0	0	0	0
78	AUS	Paris Stephens / Matthew Dodds	219	2015/2016 season (100%)	0	0	0	0	0
78	AUS	Paris Stephens / Matthew Dodds	219	2014/2015 season (100%)	0	0	0	219	0
78	AUS	Paris Stephens / Matthew Dodds	219	2013/2014 season (70%)	0	0	0	0	0
79	HUN	Anna Marie Pearce / Márk Magyar	214	2015/2016 season (100%)	214	0	0	0	0
79	HUN	Anna Marie Pearce / Márk Magyar	214	2014/2015 season (100%)	0	0	0	0	0
79	HUN	Anna Marie Pearce / Márk Magyar	214	2013/2014 season (70%)	0	0	0	0	0
80	ITA	Irma Caldara / Edoardo Caputo	194	2015/2016 season (100%)	0	97	97	0	0
80	ITA	Irma Caldara / Edoardo Caputo	194	2014/2015 season (100%)	0	0	0	0	0
80	ITA	Irma Caldara / Edoardo Caputo	194	2013/2014 season (70%)	0	0	0	0	0
81	CAN	Hayleigh Bell / Rudi Swiegers	191	2015/2016 season (100%)	0	191	0	0	0
81	CAN	Hayleigh Bell / Rudi Swiegers	191	2014/2015 season (100%)	0	0	0	0	0
81	CAN	Hayleigh Bell / Rudi Swiegers	191	2013/2014 season (70%)	0	0	0	0	0
81	USA	Jessica Pfund / Joshua Santillan	191	2015/2016 season (100%)	0	191	0	0	0
81	USA	Jessica Pfund / Joshua Santillan	191	2014/2015 season (100%)	0	0	0	0	0
81	USA	Jessica Pfund / Joshua Santillan	191	2013/2014 season (70%)	0	0	0	0	0
83	USA	Christina Zaitsev / Ernie Utah Stevens	188	2015/2016 season (100%)	0	0	0	0	0
83	USA	Christina Zaitsev / Ernie Utah Stevens	188	2014/2015 season (100%)	0	0	0	0	0
83	USA	Christina Zaitsev / Ernie Utah Stevens	188	2013/2014 season (70%)	0	104	84	0	0
84	JPN	Marin Ono / Wesley Killing	164	2015/2016 season (100%)	0	0	0	164	0
84	JPN	Marin Ono / Wesley Killing	164	2014/2015 season (100%)	0	0	0	0	0
84	JPN	Marin Ono / Wesley Killing	164	2013/2014 season (70%)	0	0	0	0	0
84	RUS	Alina Ustimkina / Nikita Volodin	164	2015/2016 season (100%)	0	164	0	0	0
84	RUS	Alina Ustimkina / Nikita Volodin	164	2014/2015 season (100%)	0	0	0	0	0
84	RUS	Alina Ustimkina / Nikita Volodin	164	2013/2014 season (70%)	0	0	0	0	0
86	UKR	Julia Lavrentieva / Yuri Rudyk	142	2015/2016 season (100%)	0	0	0	0	0
86	UKR	Julia Lavrentieva / Yuri Rudyk	142	2014/2015 season (100%)	0	0	0	0	0
86	UKR	Julia Lavrentieva / Yuri Rudyk	142	2013/2014 season (70%)	0	0	0	142	0
87	CHN	Yumeng Gao / Bowen Li	141	2015/2016 season (100%)	141	0	0	0	0
87	CHN	Yumeng Gao / Bowen Li	141	2014/2015 season (100%)	0	0	0	0	0
87	CHN	Yumeng Gao / Bowen Li	141	2013/2014 season (70%)	0	0	0	0	0
88	USA	Sarah Rose / Joseph Goodpaster	133	2015/2016 season (100%)	0	133	0	0	0
88	USA	Sarah Rose / Joseph Goodpaster	133	2014/2015 season (100%)	0	0	0	0	0
88	USA	Sarah Rose / Joseph Goodpaster	133	2013/2014 season (70%)	0	0	0	0	0
89	KAZ	Ekaterina Khokhlova / Abish Baytkanov	127	2015/2016 season (100%)	127	0	0	0	0
89	KAZ	Ekaterina Khokhlova / Abish Baytkanov	127	2014/2015 season (100%)	0	0	0	0	0
89	KAZ	Ekaterina Khokhlova / Abish Baytkanov	127	2013/2014 season (70%)	0	0	0	0	0
90	USA	Gabriella Marvaldi / Cody Dolkiewicz	120	2015/2016 season (100%)	0	120	0	0	0
90	USA	Gabriella Marvaldi / Cody Dolkiewicz	120	2014/2015 season (100%)	0	0	0	0	0
90	USA	Gabriella Marvaldi / Cody Dolkiewicz	120	2013/2014 season (70%)	0	0	0	0	0
91	ESP	Veronica Grigorieva / Aritz Maestu	115	2015/2016 season (100%)	0	0	0	0	0
91	ESP	Veronica Grigorieva / Aritz Maestu	115	2014/2015 season (100%)	0	0	0	0	0
91	ESP	Veronica Grigorieva / Aritz Maestu	115	2013/2014 season (70%)	0	0	0	115	0
92	GER	Minori Yuge / Jannis Bronisefski	108	2015/2016 season (100%)	0	108	0	0	0
92	GER	Minori Yuge / Jannis Bronisefski	108	2014/2015 season (100%)	0	0	0	0	0
92	GER	Minori Yuge / Jannis Bronisefski	108	2013/2014 season (70%)	0	0	0	0	0
92	CHN	Yue Han / Ziyu Kang	108	2015/2016 season (100%)	0	108	0	0	0
92	CHN	Yue Han / Ziyu Kang	108	2014/2015 season (100%)	0	0	0	0	0
92	CHN	Yue Han / Ziyu Kang	108	2013/2014 season (70%)	0	0	0	0	0
94	CAN	Dylan Conway / Dustin Sherriff-Clayton	104	2015/2016 season (100%)	0	0	0	0	0
94	CAN	Dylan Conway / Dustin Sherriff-Clayton	104	2014/2015 season (100%)	0	0	0	0	0
94	CAN	Dylan Conway / Dustin Sherriff-Clayton	104	2013/2014 season (70%)	0	104	0	0	0
95	ITA	Giulia Foresti / Leo Luca Sforza	93	2015/2016 season (100%)	0	0	0	0	0
95	ITA	Giulia Foresti / Leo Luca Sforza	93	2014/2015 season (100%)	0	0	0	0	0
95	ITA	Giulia Foresti / Leo Luca Sforza	93	2013/2014 season (70%)	0	93	0	0	0
96	TUR	Cagla Demirsal / Berk Akalin	65	2015/2016 season (100%)	0	0	0	0	0
96	TUR	Cagla Demirsal / Berk Akalin	65	2014/2015 season (100%)	0	0	0	0	0
96	TUR	Cagla Demirsal / Berk Akalin	65	2013/2014 season (70%)	65	0	0	0	0

==== Ice dance (140 couples) ====
As of 1 April 2016

Rank	Nation	Couple	Points	Season	ISU Championships or Olympics	(Junior) Grand Prix and Final		Selected International Competition	
Rank	Nation	Couple	Points	Season	Best	Best	2nd Best	Best	2nd Best
1	USA	Madison Chock / Evan Bates	5020	2015/2016 season (100%)	972	720	400	300	0
1	USA	Madison Chock / Evan Bates	5020	2014/2015 season (100%)	1080	720	400	270	0
1	USA	Madison Chock / Evan Bates	5020	2013/2014 season (70%)	551	227	227	158	0
2	CAN	Kaitlyn Weaver / Andrew Poje	4917	2015/2016 season (100%)	787	800	400	300	0
2	CAN	Kaitlyn Weaver / Andrew Poje	4917	2014/2015 season (100%)	972	800	400	300	0
2	CAN	Kaitlyn Weaver / Andrew Poje	4917	2013/2014 season (70%)	756	368	252	158	0
3	USA	Maia Shibutani / Alex Shibutani	4636	2015/2016 season (100%)	1080	583	400	243	0
3	USA	Maia Shibutani / Alex Shibutani	4636	2014/2015 season (100%)	787	583	360	300	300
3	USA	Maia Shibutani / Alex Shibutani	4636	2013/2014 season (70%)	496	227	227	0	0
4	FRA	Gabriella Papadakis / Guillaume Cizeron	4382	2015/2016 season (100%)	1200	0	0	0	0
4	FRA	Gabriella Papadakis / Guillaume Cizeron	4382	2014/2015 season (100%)	1200	648	400	300	0
4	FRA	Gabriella Papadakis / Guillaume Cizeron	4382	2013/2014 season (70%)	237	183	149	175	127
5	ITA	Anna Cappellini / Luca Lanotte	3702	2015/2016 season (100%)	875	648	400	250	0
5	ITA	Anna Cappellini / Luca Lanotte	3702	2014/2015 season (100%)	875	324	0	0	0
5	ITA	Anna Cappellini / Luca Lanotte	3702	2013/2014 season (70%)	840	330	252	0	0
6	USA	Madison Hubbell / Zachary Donohue	3592	2015/2016 season (100%)	709	472	400	300	0
6	USA	Madison Hubbell / Zachary Donohue	3592	2014/2015 season (100%)	465	324	324	300	0
6	USA	Madison Hubbell / Zachary Donohue	3592	2013/2014 season (70%)	588	227	204	175	0
7	CAN	Piper Gilles / Paul Poirier	3422	2015/2016 season (100%)	574	360	324	300	0
7	CAN	Piper Gilles / Paul Poirier	3422	2014/2015 season (100%)	709	525	360	270	0
7	CAN	Piper Gilles / Paul Poirier	3422	2013/2014 season (70%)	529	183	165	0	0
8	GBR	Penny Coomes / Nicholas Buckland	3274	2015/2016 season (100%)	638	292	262	270	250
8	GBR	Penny Coomes / Nicholas Buckland	3274	2014/2015 season (100%)	0	324	262	250	250
8	GBR	Penny Coomes / Nicholas Buckland	3274	2013/2014 season (70%)	476	149	0	175	115
9	ITA	Charlene Guignard / Marco Fabbri	3183	2015/2016 season (100%)	465	292	292	300	300
9	ITA	Charlene Guignard / Marco Fabbri	3183	2014/2015 season (100%)	496	262	236	270	270
9	ITA	Charlene Guignard / Marco Fabbri	3183	2013/2014 season (70%)	281	149	0	175	158
10	RUS	Ekaterina Bobrova / Dmitri Soloviev	2979	2015/2016 season (100%)	680	525	360	0	0
10	RUS	Ekaterina Bobrova / Dmitri Soloviev	2979	2014/2015 season (100%)	0	0	0	0	0
10	RUS	Ekaterina Bobrova / Dmitri Soloviev	2979	2013/2014 season (70%)	551	408	280	175	0
11	RUS	Alexandra Stepanova / Ivan Bukin	2733	2015/2016 season (100%)	551	324	292	0	0
11	RUS	Alexandra Stepanova / Ivan Bukin	2733	2014/2015 season (100%)	680	324	262	300	0
11	RUS	Alexandra Stepanova / Ivan Bukin	2733	2013/2014 season (70%)	0	134	0	0	0
12	USA	Kaitlin Hawayek / Jean-Luc Baker	2682	2015/2016 season (100%)	0	292	0	270	219
12	USA	Kaitlin Hawayek / Jean-Luc Baker	2682	2014/2015 season (100%)	551	324	236	219	0
12	USA	Kaitlin Hawayek / Jean-Luc Baker	2682	2013/2014 season (70%)	350	221	175	0	0
13	SVK	Federica Testa / Lukáš Csölley	2398	2015/2016 season (100%)	402	292	0	270	219
13	SVK	Federica Testa / Lukáš Csölley	2398	2014/2015 season (100%)	402	213	0	300	300
13	SVK	Federica Testa / Lukáš Csölley	2398	2013/2014 season (70%)	185	0	0	127	127
14	CAN	Alexandra Paul / Mitchell Islam	2370	2015/2016 season (100%)	0	236	0	270	0
14	CAN	Alexandra Paul / Mitchell Islam	2370	2014/2015 season (100%)	496	262	236	219	0
14	CAN	Alexandra Paul / Mitchell Islam	2370	2013/2014 season (70%)	326	183	0	142	0
15	RUS	Elena Ilinykh / Ruslan Zhiganshin	2356	2015/2016 season (100%)	0	324	262	300	0
15	RUS	Elena Ilinykh / Ruslan Zhiganshin	2356	2014/2015 season (100%)	638	472	360	0	0
15	RUS	Elena Ilinykh / Ruslan Zhiganshin	2356	2013/2014 season (70%)	0	0	0	0	0
16	DEN	Laurence Fournier Beaudry / Nikolaj Sørensen	2281	2015/2016 season (100%)	362	262	213	270	243
16	DEN	Laurence Fournier Beaudry / Nikolaj Sørensen	2281	2014/2015 season (100%)	418	0	0	270	243
16	DEN	Laurence Fournier Beaudry / Nikolaj Sørensen	2281	2013/2014 season (70%)	98	0	0	158	142
17	UKR	Alexandra Nazarova / Maxim Nikitin	2280	2015/2016 season (100%)	180	213	0	219	178
17	UKR	Alexandra Nazarova / Maxim Nikitin	2280	2014/2015 season (100%)	405	203	182	270	219
17	UKR	Alexandra Nazarova / Maxim Nikitin	2280	2013/2014 season (70%)	230	161	158	0	0
18	RUS	Ksenia Monko / Kirill Khaliavin	2221	2015/2016 season (100%)	0	262	0	0	0
18	RUS	Ksenia Monko / Kirill Khaliavin	2221	2014/2015 season (100%)	574	360	292	250	0
18	RUS	Ksenia Monko / Kirill Khaliavin	2221	2013/2014 season (70%)	0	183	165	158	142
19	KOR	Rebeka Kim / Kirill Minov	2093	2015/2016 season (100%)	293	236	0	250	178
19	KOR	Rebeka Kim / Kirill Minov	2093	2014/2015 season (100%)	362	213	191	243	0
19	KOR	Rebeka Kim / Kirill Minov	2093	2013/2014 season (70%)	207	127	115	0	0
20	ESP	Sara Hurtado / Adria Diaz	1985	2015/2016 season (100%)	0	0	0	0	0
20	ESP	Sara Hurtado / Adria Diaz	1985	2014/2015 season (100%)	551	292	191	243	198
20	ESP	Sara Hurtado / Adria Diaz	1985	2013/2014 season (70%)	237	0	0	158	115
21	USA	Lorraine McNamara / Quinn Carpenter	1978	2015/2016 season (100%)	500	350	250	0	0
21	USA	Lorraine McNamara / Quinn Carpenter	1978	2014/2015 season (100%)	450	225	203	0	0
21	USA	Lorraine McNamara / Quinn Carpenter	1978	2013/2014 season (70%)	256	199	175	0	0
22	CHN	Shiyue Wang / Xinyu Liu	1964	2015/2016 season (100%)	362	236	191	0	0
22	CHN	Shiyue Wang / Xinyu Liu	1964	2014/2015 season (100%)	446	236	0	250	243
22	CHN	Shiyue Wang / Xinyu Liu	1964	2013/2014 season (70%)	253	0	0	0	0
23	RUS	Anna Yanovskaya / Sergey Mozgov	1896	2015/2016 season (100%)	0	236	236	0	0
23	RUS	Anna Yanovskaya / Sergey Mozgov	1896	2014/2015 season (100%)	500	350	250	0	0
23	RUS	Anna Yanovskaya / Sergey Mozgov	1896	2013/2014 season (70%)	315	245	175	0	0
24	USA	Meryl Davis / Charlie White	1855	2015/2016 season (100%)	0	0	0	0	0
24	USA	Meryl Davis / Charlie White	1855	2014/2015 season (100%)	0	0	0	0	0
24	USA	Meryl Davis / Charlie White	1855	2013/2014 season (70%)	840	560	280	175	0
25	RUS	Victoria Sinitsina / Nikita Katsalapov	1801	2015/2016 season (100%)	612	360	324	0	0
25	RUS	Victoria Sinitsina / Nikita Katsalapov	1801	2014/2015 season (100%)	0	292	213	0	0
25	RUS	Victoria Sinitsina / Nikita Katsalapov	1801	2013/2014 season (70%)	0	0	0	0	0
26	USA	Rachel Parsons / Michael Parsons	1777	2015/2016 season (100%)	450	284	250	0	0
26	USA	Rachel Parsons / Michael Parsons	1777	2014/2015 season (100%)	365	225	203	0	0
26	USA	Rachel Parsons / Michael Parsons	1777	2013/2014 season (70%)	167	158	158	0	0
27	CAN	Elisabeth Paradis / Francois-Xavier Ouellette	1748	2015/2016 season (100%)	496	191	0	243	0
27	CAN	Elisabeth Paradis / Francois-Xavier Ouellette	1748	2014/2015 season (100%)	0	292	213	198	0
27	CAN	Elisabeth Paradis / Francois-Xavier Ouellette	1748	2013/2014 season (70%)	0	0	0	115	0
28	TUR	Alisa Agafonova / Alper Uçar	1741	2015/2016 season (100%)	264	213	0	300	250
28	TUR	Alisa Agafonova / Alper Uçar	1741	2014/2015 season (100%)	264	0	0	225	225
28	TUR	Alisa Agafonova / Alper Uçar	1741	2013/2014 season (70%)	113	0	0	158	142
29	CAN	Tessa Virtue / Scott Moir	1715	2015/2016 season (100%)	0	0	0	0	0
29	CAN	Tessa Virtue / Scott Moir	1715	2014/2015 season (100%)	0	0	0	0	0
29	CAN	Tessa Virtue / Scott Moir	1715	2013/2014 season (70%)	756	504	280	175	0
30	USA	Anastasia Cannuscio / Colin McManus	1708	2015/2016 season (100%)	0	262	236	243	219
30	USA	Anastasia Cannuscio / Colin McManus	1708	2014/2015 season (100%)	0	262	0	243	243
30	USA	Anastasia Cannuscio / Colin McManus	1708	2013/2014 season (70%)	0	0	0	175	0
31	BLR	Viktoria Kavaliova / Yurii Bieliaiev	1647	2015/2016 season (100%)	173	213	0	270	219
31	BLR	Viktoria Kavaliova / Yurii Bieliaiev	1647	2014/2015 season (100%)	0	0	0	270	203
31	BLR	Viktoria Kavaliova / Yurii Bieliaiev	1647	2013/2014 season (70%)	80	115	104	0	0
32	RUS	Alla Loboda / Pavel Drozd	1535	2015/2016 season (100%)	405	315	250	0	0
32	RUS	Alla Loboda / Pavel Drozd	1535	2014/2015 season (100%)	0	315	250	0	0
32	RUS	Alla Loboda / Pavel Drozd	1535	2013/2014 season (70%)	0	142	142	0	0
33	POL	Natalia Kaliszek / Maksim Spodirev	1532	2015/2016 season (100%)	293	0	0	270	250
33	POL	Natalia Kaliszek / Maksim Spodirev	1532	2014/2015 season (100%)	266	0	0	250	203
33	POL	Natalia Kaliszek / Maksim Spodirev	1532	2013/2014 season (70%)	0	0	0	0	0
34	RUS	Betina Popova / Yuri Vlasenko	1520	2015/2016 season (100%)	295	255	250	0	0
34	RUS	Betina Popova / Yuri Vlasenko	1520	2014/2015 season (100%)	174	284	250	0	0
34	RUS	Betina Popova / Yuri Vlasenko	1520	2013/2014 season (70%)	186	178	175	0	0
35	JPN	Emi Hirai / Marien De La Asuncion	1431	2015/2016 season (100%)	264	191	0	219	164
35	JPN	Emi Hirai / Marien De La Asuncion	1431	2014/2015 season (100%)	402	191	0	0	0
35	JPN	Emi Hirai / Marien De La Asuncion	1431	2013/2014 season (70%)	205	0	0	0	0
36	CAN	Madeline Edwards / Zhao Kai Pang	1359	2015/2016 season (100%)	0	0	0	0	0
36	CAN	Madeline Edwards / Zhao Kai Pang	1359	2014/2015 season (100%)	295	250	230	0	0
36	CAN	Madeline Edwards / Zhao Kai Pang	1359	2013/2014 season (70%)	284	158	142	0	0
37	CZE	Cortney Mansour / Michal Ceska	1249	2015/2016 season (100%)	237	0	0	182	178
37	CZE	Cortney Mansour / Michal Ceska	1249	2014/2015 season (100%)	156	0	0	225	203
37	CZE	Cortney Mansour / Michal Ceska	1249	2013/2014 season (70%)	99	68	0	0	0
38	AUT	Barbora Silná / Juri Kurakin	1239	2015/2016 season (100%)	162	0	0	225	219
38	AUT	Barbora Silná / Juri Kurakin	1239	2014/2015 season (100%)	140	0	0	250	243
38	AUT	Barbora Silná / Juri Kurakin	1239	2013/2014 season (70%)	0	0	0	0	0
39	UKR	Renata Oganesian / Mark Bardei	1212	2015/2016 season (100%)	365	250	230	0	0
39	UKR	Renata Oganesian / Mark Bardei	1212	2014/2015 season (100%)	0	203	164	0	0
39	UKR	Renata Oganesian / Mark Bardei	1212	2013/2014 season (70%)	0	0	0	0	0
40	FRA	Angelique Abachkina / Louis Thauron	1178	2015/2016 season (100%)	266	225	182	0	0
40	FRA	Angelique Abachkina / Louis Thauron	1178	2014/2015 season (100%)	239	133	133	0	0
40	FRA	Angelique Abachkina / Louis Thauron	1178	2013/2014 season (70%)	58	84	68	0	0
41	USA	Elliana Pogrebinsky / Alex Benoit	1175	2015/2016 season (100%)	365	203	182	0	0
41	USA	Elliana Pogrebinsky / Alex Benoit	1175	2014/2015 season (100%)	141	164	120	0	0
41	USA	Elliana Pogrebinsky / Alex Benoit	1175	2013/2014 season (70%)	0	0	0	0	0
42	FIN	Cecilia Törn / Jussiville Partanen	1039	2015/2016 season (100%)	200	0	0	250	243
42	FIN	Cecilia Törn / Jussiville Partanen	1039	2014/2015 season (100%)	0	0	0	182	164
42	FIN	Cecilia Törn / Jussiville Partanen	1039	2013/2014 season (70%)	0	0	0	0	0
43	EST	Irina Shtork / Taavi Rand	1006	2015/2016 season (100%)	0	0	0	0	0
43	EST	Irina Shtork / Taavi Rand	1006	2014/2015 season (100%)	237	0	0	182	164
43	EST	Irina Shtork / Taavi Rand	1006	2013/2014 season (70%)	150	0	0	158	115
44	UKR	Valeria Gaistruk / Alexei Olejnik	1000	2015/2016 season (100%)	0	0	0	203	182
44	UKR	Valeria Gaistruk / Alexei Olejnik	1000	2014/2015 season (100%)	127	164	164	0	0
44	UKR	Valeria Gaistruk / Alexei Olejnik	1000	2013/2014 season (70%)	0	84	76	0	0
45	FIN	Olesia Karmi / Max Lindholm	953	2015/2016 season (100%)	0	0	0	243	203
45	FIN	Olesia Karmi / Max Lindholm	953	2014/2015 season (100%)	126	0	0	203	178
45	FIN	Olesia Karmi / Max Lindholm	953	2013/2014 season (70%)	0	0	0	115	115
46	ITA	Misato Komatsubara / Andrea Fabbri	948	2015/2016 season (100%)	0	0	0	270	225
46	ITA	Misato Komatsubara / Andrea Fabbri	948	2014/2015 season (100%)	0	0	0	250	203
46	ITA	Misato Komatsubara / Andrea Fabbri	948	2013/2014 season (70%)	0	0	0	0	0
47	ISR	Isabella Tobias / Ilia Tkachenko	947	2015/2016 season (100%)	377	0	0	300	270
47	ISR	Isabella Tobias / Ilia Tkachenko	947	2014/2015 season (100%)	0	0	0	0	0
47	ISR	Isabella Tobias / Ilia Tkachenko	947	2013/2014 season (70%)	0	0	0	0	0
48	RUS	Sofia Evdokimova / Egor Bazin	925	2015/2016 season (100%)	0	203	164	0	0
48	RUS	Sofia Evdokimova / Egor Bazin	925	2014/2015 season (100%)	194	182	182	0	0
48	RUS	Sofia Evdokimova / Egor Bazin	925	2013/2014 season (70%)	0	142	127	0	0
49	JPN	Kana Muramoto / Chris Reed	884	2015/2016 season (100%)	446	213	0	225	0
49	JPN	Kana Muramoto / Chris Reed	884	2014/2015 season (100%)	0	0	0	0	0
49	JPN	Kana Muramoto / Chris Reed	884	2013/2014 season (70%)	0	0	0	0	0
50	CHN	Yiyi Zhang / Nan Wu	880	2015/2016 season (100%)	237	0	0	0	0
50	CHN	Yiyi Zhang / Nan Wu	880	2014/2015 season (100%)	0	213	0	0	0
50	CHN	Yiyi Zhang / Nan Wu	880	2013/2014 season (70%)	281	149	0	0	0
51	CAN	Brianna Delmaestro / Timothy Lum	836	2015/2016 season (100%)	0	0	0	178	0
51	CAN	Brianna Delmaestro / Timothy Lum	836	2014/2015 season (100%)	0	225	203	0	0
51	CAN	Brianna Delmaestro / Timothy Lum	836	2013/2014 season (70%)	0	115	115	0	0
52	AZE	Julia Zlobina / Alexei Sitnikov	831	2015/2016 season (100%)	0	0	0	0	0
52	AZE	Julia Zlobina / Alexei Sitnikov	831	2014/2015 season (100%)	0	0	0	0	0
52	AZE	Julia Zlobina / Alexei Sitnikov	831	2013/2014 season (70%)	347	134	0	175	175
53	RUS	Anastasia Shpilevaya / Grigory Smirnov	821	2015/2016 season (100%)	328	182	0	0	0
53	RUS	Anastasia Shpilevaya / Grigory Smirnov	821	2014/2015 season (100%)	0	203	108	0	0
53	RUS	Anastasia Shpilevaya / Grigory Smirnov	821	2013/2014 season (70%)	0	0	0	0	0
54	GER	Katharina Müller / Tim Dieck	816	2015/2016 season (100%)	0	0	0	203	203
54	GER	Katharina Müller / Tim Dieck	816	2014/2015 season (100%)	157	133	120	0	0
54	GER	Katharina Müller / Tim Dieck	816	2013/2014 season (70%)	0	0	0	0	0
55	KOR	Yura Min / Alexander Gamelin	782	2015/2016 season (100%)	402	0	0	198	182
55	KOR	Yura Min / Alexander Gamelin	782	2014/2015 season (100%)	0	0	0	0	0
55	KOR	Yura Min / Alexander Gamelin	782	2013/2014 season (70%)	0	0	0	0	0
56	CHN	Yue Zhao / Xun Zheng	778	2015/2016 season (100%)	0	262	0	0	0
56	CHN	Yue Zhao / Xun Zheng	778	2014/2015 season (100%)	325	191	0	0	0
56	CHN	Yue Zhao / Xun Zheng	778	2013/2014 season (70%)	0	0	0	0	0
57	GBR	Olivia Smart / Joseph Buckland	772	2015/2016 season (100%)	0	0	0	0	0
57	GBR	Olivia Smart / Joseph Buckland	772	2014/2015 season (100%)	0	0	0	225	225
57	GBR	Olivia Smart / Joseph Buckland	772	2013/2014 season (70%)	136	93	93	0	0
58	USA	Christina Carreira / Anthony Ponomarenko	753	2015/2016 season (100%)	0	225	182	0	0
58	USA	Christina Carreira / Anthony Ponomarenko	753	2014/2015 season (100%)	0	182	164	0	0
58	USA	Christina Carreira / Anthony Ponomarenko	753	2013/2014 season (70%)	0	0	0	0	0
59	ITA	Sara Ghislandi / Giona Terzo Ortenzi	732	2015/2016 season (100%)	194	164	133	0	0
59	ITA	Sara Ghislandi / Giona Terzo Ortenzi	732	2014/2015 season (100%)	0	148	0	0	0
59	ITA	Sara Ghislandi / Giona Terzo Ortenzi	732	2013/2014 season (70%)	0	93	0	0	0
60	ISR	Allison Reed / Vasili Rogov	723	2015/2016 season (100%)	0	0	0	0	0
60	ISR	Allison Reed / Vasili Rogov	723	2014/2015 season (100%)	173	0	0	225	198
60	ISR	Allison Reed / Vasili Rogov	723	2013/2014 season (70%)	0	0	0	127	0
61	RUS	Evgenia Kosigina / Nikolai Moroshkin	722	2015/2016 season (100%)	0	0	0	0	0
61	RUS	Evgenia Kosigina / Nikolai Moroshkin	722	2014/2015 season (100%)	0	0	0	225	219
61	RUS	Evgenia Kosigina / Nikolai Moroshkin	722	2013/2014 season (70%)	151	127	0	0	0
62	CAN	Melinda Meng / Andrew Meng	720	2015/2016 season (100%)	157	182	164	0	0
62	CAN	Melinda Meng / Andrew Meng	720	2014/2015 season (100%)	0	133	0	0	0
62	CAN	Melinda Meng / Andrew Meng	720	2013/2014 season (70%)	0	84	0	0	0
63	FRA	Marie-Jade Lauriault / Romain Le Gac	719	2015/2016 season (100%)	239	250	230	0	0
63	FRA	Marie-Jade Lauriault / Romain Le Gac	719	2014/2015 season (100%)	0	0	0	0	0
63	FRA	Marie-Jade Lauriault / Romain Le Gac	719	2013/2014 season (70%)	0	0	0	0	0
64	KOR	Ho Jung Lee / Richard Kang In Kam	715	2015/2016 season (100%)	325	182	133	0	0
64	KOR	Ho Jung Lee / Richard Kang In Kam	715	2014/2015 season (100%)	75	0	0	0	0
64	KOR	Ho Jung Lee / Richard Kang In Kam	715	2013/2014 season (70%)	0	0	0	0	0
65	GER	Kavita Lorenz / Panagiotis Polizoakis	691	2015/2016 season (100%)	222	0	0	250	219
65	GER	Kavita Lorenz / Panagiotis Polizoakis	691	2014/2015 season (100%)	0	0	0	0	0
65	GER	Kavita Lorenz / Panagiotis Polizoakis	691	2013/2014 season (70%)	0	0	0	0	0
66	FRA	Lorenza Alessandrini / Pierre Souquet	684	2015/2016 season (100%)	113	0	0	225	182
66	FRA	Lorenza Alessandrini / Pierre Souquet	684	2014/2015 season (100%)	0	0	0	164	0
66	FRA	Lorenza Alessandrini / Pierre Souquet	684	2013/2014 season (70%)	0	0	0	0	0
67	USA	Julia Biechler / Damian Dodge	679	2015/2016 season (100%)	0	203	164	0	0
67	USA	Julia Biechler / Damian Dodge	679	2014/2015 season (100%)	0	164	148	0	0
67	USA	Julia Biechler / Damian Dodge	679	2013/2014 season (70%)	0	0	0	0	0
68	MEX	Pilar Maekawa Moreno / Leonardo Maekawa Moreno	657	2015/2016 season (100%)	0	0	0	0	0
68	MEX	Pilar Maekawa Moreno / Leonardo Maekawa Moreno	657	2014/2015 season (100%)	293	0	0	198	0
68	MEX	Pilar Maekawa Moreno / Leonardo Maekawa Moreno	657	2013/2014 season (70%)	166	0	0	0	0
69	CZE	Nicole Kuzmich / Alexandr Sinicyn	656	2015/2016 season (100%)	174	133	133	0	0
69	CZE	Nicole Kuzmich / Alexandr Sinicyn	656	2014/2015 season (100%)	0	108	108	0	0
69	CZE	Nicole Kuzmich / Alexandr Sinicyn	656	2013/2014 season (70%)	0	0	0	0	0
70	FRA	Sarah Marine Rouffanche / Geoffrey Brissaud	622	2015/2016 season (100%)	0	120	120	0	0
70	FRA	Sarah Marine Rouffanche / Geoffrey Brissaud	622	2014/2015 season (100%)	114	148	120	0	0
70	FRA	Sarah Marine Rouffanche / Geoffrey Brissaud	622	2013/2014 season (70%)	0	0	0	0	0
71	ARM	Tina Garabedian / Simon Proulx-Senecal	608	2015/2016 season (100%)	140	0	0	243	225
71	ARM	Tina Garabedian / Simon Proulx-Senecal	608	2014/2015 season (100%)	0	0	0	0	0
71	ARM	Tina Garabedian / Simon Proulx-Senecal	608	2013/2014 season (70%)	0	0	0	0	0
72	USA	Chloe Lewis / Logan Bye	607	2015/2016 season (100%)	0	164	164	0	0
72	USA	Chloe Lewis / Logan Bye	607	2014/2015 season (100%)	0	164	0	0	0
72	USA	Chloe Lewis / Logan Bye	607	2013/2014 season (70%)	0	115	0	0	0
73	LAT	Olga Jakushina / Andrey Nevskiy	601	2015/2016 season (100%)	0	0	0	225	178
73	LAT	Olga Jakushina / Andrey Nevskiy	601	2014/2015 season (100%)	0	0	0	198	0
73	LAT	Olga Jakushina / Andrey Nevskiy	601	2013/2014 season (70%)	0	0	0	0	0
74	CAN	Mackenzie Bent / Dmitre Razgulajevs	588	2015/2016 season (100%)	215	225	148	0	0
74	CAN	Mackenzie Bent / Dmitre Razgulajevs	588	2014/2015 season (100%)	0	0	0	0	0
74	CAN	Mackenzie Bent / Dmitre Razgulajevs	588	2013/2014 season (70%)	0	0	0	0	0
75	KAZ	Anastasia Khromova / Daryn Zhunussov	560	2015/2016 season (100%)	214	0	0	182	164
75	KAZ	Anastasia Khromova / Daryn Zhunussov	560	2014/2015 season (100%)	0	0	0	0	0
75	KAZ	Anastasia Khromova / Daryn Zhunussov	560	2013/2014 season (70%)	0	0	0	0	0
76	CAN	Audrey Croteau-Villeneuve / Jeff Hough	537	2015/2016 season (100%)	0	148	108	0	0
76	CAN	Audrey Croteau-Villeneuve / Jeff Hough	537	2014/2015 season (100%)	0	148	133	0	0
76	CAN	Audrey Croteau-Villeneuve / Jeff Hough	537	2013/2014 season (70%)	0	0	0	0	0
77	FRA	Laureline Aubry / Kevin Bellingard	531	2015/2016 season (100%)	0	0	0	164	164
77	FRA	Laureline Aubry / Kevin Bellingard	531	2014/2015 season (100%)	0	0	0	203	0
77	FRA	Laureline Aubry / Kevin Bellingard	531	2013/2014 season (70%)	0	0	0	0	0
78	USA	Danielle Thomas / Daniel Eaton	525	2015/2016 season (100%)	0	0	0	300	225
78	USA	Danielle Thomas / Daniel Eaton	525	2014/2015 season (100%)	0	0	0	0	0
78	USA	Danielle Thomas / Daniel Eaton	525	2013/2014 season (70%)	0	0	0	0	0
79	FRA	Peroline Ojardias / Michael Bramante	524	2015/2016 season (100%)	0	0	0	182	178
79	FRA	Peroline Ojardias / Michael Bramante	524	2014/2015 season (100%)	0	0	0	164	0
79	FRA	Peroline Ojardias / Michael Bramante	524	2013/2014 season (70%)	0	0	0	0	0
80	CAN	Carolane Soucisse / Simon Tanguay	510	2015/2016 season (100%)	0	0	0	203	203
80	CAN	Carolane Soucisse / Simon Tanguay	510	2014/2015 season (100%)	0	0	0	0	0
80	CAN	Carolane Soucisse / Simon Tanguay	510	2013/2014 season (70%)	0	104	0	0	0
81	RUS	Anastasia Skoptcova / Kirill Aleshin	432	2015/2016 season (100%)	0	225	207	0	0
81	RUS	Anastasia Skoptcova / Kirill Aleshin	432	2014/2015 season (100%)	0	0	0	0	0
81	RUS	Anastasia Skoptcova / Kirill Aleshin	432	2013/2014 season (70%)	0	0	0	0	0
82	CHN	Xibei Li / Guangyao Xiang	420	2015/2016 season (100%)	192	108	0	0	0
82	CHN	Xibei Li / Guangyao Xiang	420	2014/2015 season (100%)	0	120	0	0	0
82	CHN	Xibei Li / Guangyao Xiang	420	2013/2014 season (70%)	0	0	0	0	0
83	UKR	Maria Golubtsova / Kirill Belobrov	410	2015/2016 season (100%)	83	133	97	0	0
83	UKR	Maria Golubtsova / Kirill Belobrov	410	2014/2015 season (100%)	0	97	0	0	0
83	UKR	Maria Golubtsova / Kirill Belobrov	410	2013/2014 season (70%)	0	0	0	0	0
84	RUS	Sofia Shevchenko / Igor Eremenko	406	2015/2016 season (100%)	0	203	203	0	0
84	RUS	Sofia Shevchenko / Igor Eremenko	406	2014/2015 season (100%)	0	0	0	0	0
84	RUS	Sofia Shevchenko / Igor Eremenko	406	2013/2014 season (70%)	0	0	0	0	0
85	UKR	Siobhan Heekin-Canedy / Dmitri Dun	391	2015/2016 season (100%)	0	0	0	0	0
85	UKR	Siobhan Heekin-Canedy / Dmitri Dun	391	2014/2015 season (100%)	0	0	0	0	0
85	UKR	Siobhan Heekin-Canedy / Dmitri Dun	391	2013/2014 season (70%)	0	134	0	142	115
86	RUS	Sofia Polishchuk / Alexander Vakhnov	367	2015/2016 season (100%)	0	203	164	0	0
86	RUS	Sofia Polishchuk / Alexander Vakhnov	367	2014/2015 season (100%)	0	0	0	0	0
86	RUS	Sofia Polishchuk / Alexander Vakhnov	367	2013/2014 season (70%)	0	0	0	0	0
87	RUS	Eva Khachaturian / Andrei Bagin	364	2015/2016 season (100%)	0	0	0	0	0
87	RUS	Eva Khachaturian / Andrei Bagin	364	2014/2015 season (100%)	0	182	182	0	0
87	RUS	Eva Khachaturian / Andrei Bagin	364	2013/2014 season (70%)	0	0	0	0	0
88	CAN	Lauren Collins / Shane Firus	346	2015/2016 season (100%)	0	0	0	198	0
88	CAN	Lauren Collins / Shane Firus	346	2014/2015 season (100%)	0	148	0	0	0
88	CAN	Lauren Collins / Shane Firus	346	2013/2014 season (70%)	0	0	0	0	0
89	UKR	Anzhelika Yurchenko / Volodymyr Byelikov	342	2015/2016 season (100%)	114	120	108	0	0
89	UKR	Anzhelika Yurchenko / Volodymyr Byelikov	342	2014/2015 season (100%)	0	0	0	0	0
89	UKR	Anzhelika Yurchenko / Volodymyr Byelikov	342	2013/2014 season (70%)	0	0	0	0	0
90	RUS	Ekaterina Pushkash / Jonathan Guerreiro	317	2015/2016 season (100%)	0	0	0	0	0
90	RUS	Ekaterina Pushkash / Jonathan Guerreiro	317	2014/2015 season (100%)	0	0	0	0	0
90	RUS	Ekaterina Pushkash / Jonathan Guerreiro	317	2013/2014 season (70%)	0	0	0	175	142
91	BLR	Maria Oleynik / Yuri Hulitski	298	2015/2016 season (100%)	93	108	97	0	0
91	BLR	Maria Oleynik / Yuri Hulitski	298	2014/2015 season (100%)	0	0	0	0	0
91	BLR	Maria Oleynik / Yuri Hulitski	298	2013/2014 season (70%)	0	0	0	0	0
92	CAN	Payten Howland / Simon-Pierre Malette-Paque	296	2015/2016 season (100%)	0	148	148	0	0
92	CAN	Payten Howland / Simon-Pierre Malette-Paque	296	2014/2015 season (100%)	0	0	0	0	0
92	CAN	Payten Howland / Simon-Pierre Malette-Paque	296	2013/2014 season (70%)	0	0	0	0	0
93	ESP	Celia Robledo / Luis Fenero	290	2015/2016 season (100%)	126	0	0	164	0
93	ESP	Celia Robledo / Luis Fenero	290	2014/2015 season (100%)	0	0	0	0	0
93	ESP	Celia Robledo / Luis Fenero	290	2013/2014 season (70%)	0	0	0	0	0
94	CAN	Marjorie Lajoie / Zachary Lagha	274	2015/2016 season (100%)	141	133	0	0	0
94	CAN	Marjorie Lajoie / Zachary Lagha	274	2014/2015 season (100%)	0	0	0	0	0
94	CAN	Marjorie Lajoie / Zachary Lagha	274	2013/2014 season (70%)	0	0	0	0	0
95	USA	Emily Day / Kevin Leahy	268	2015/2016 season (100%)	0	148	0	0	0
95	USA	Emily Day / Kevin Leahy	268	2014/2015 season (100%)	0	120	0	0	0
95	USA	Emily Day / Kevin Leahy	268	2013/2014 season (70%)	0	0	0	0	0
96	RUS	Tiffany Zahorski / Jonathan Guerreiro	250	2015/2016 season (100%)	0	0	0	250	0
96	RUS	Tiffany Zahorski / Jonathan Guerreiro	250	2014/2015 season (100%)	0	0	0	0	0
96	RUS	Tiffany Zahorski / Jonathan Guerreiro	250	2013/2014 season (70%)	0	0	0	0	0
96	CAN	Nicole Orford / Asher Hill	250	2015/2016 season (100%)	0	0	0	250	0
96	CAN	Nicole Orford / Asher Hill	250	2014/2015 season (100%)	0	0	0	0	0
96	CAN	Nicole Orford / Asher Hill	250	2013/2014 season (70%)	0	0	0	0	0
98	RUS	Ludmila Sosnitskaia / Pavel Golovishnokov	243	2015/2016 season (100%)	0	0	0	243	0
98	RUS	Ludmila Sosnitskaia / Pavel Golovishnokov	243	2014/2015 season (100%)	0	0	0	0	0
98	RUS	Ludmila Sosnitskaia / Pavel Golovishnokov	243	2013/2014 season (70%)	0	0	0	0	0
99	GER	Ria Schiffner / Julian Salatzki	232	2015/2016 season (100%)	0	0	0	0	0
99	GER	Ria Schiffner / Julian Salatzki	232	2014/2015 season (100%)	0	0	0	0	0
99	GER	Ria Schiffner / Julian Salatzki	232	2013/2014 season (70%)	72	84	76	0	0
100	CAN	Hannah Whitley / Elliott Graham	230	2015/2016 season (100%)	0	133	0	0	0
100	CAN	Hannah Whitley / Elliott Graham	230	2014/2015 season (100%)	0	97	0	0	0
100	CAN	Hannah Whitley / Elliott Graham	230	2013/2014 season (70%)	0	0	0	0	0
101	CAN	Andreanne Poulin / Marc-Andre Servant	225	2015/2016 season (100%)	0	0	0	225	0
101	CAN	Andreanne Poulin / Marc-Andre Servant	225	2014/2015 season (100%)	0	0	0	0	0
101	CAN	Andreanne Poulin / Marc-Andre Servant	225	2013/2014 season (70%)	0	0	0	0	0
102	GER	Ria Schwendinger / Valentin Wunderlich	223	2015/2016 season (100%)	103	120	0	0	0
102	GER	Ria Schwendinger / Valentin Wunderlich	223	2014/2015 season (100%)	0	0	0	0	0
102	GER	Ria Schwendinger / Valentin Wunderlich	223	2013/2014 season (70%)	0	0	0	0	0
103	GRE	Carina Glastris / Nicholas Lettner	220	2015/2016 season (100%)	0	0	0	0	0
103	GRE	Carina Glastris / Nicholas Lettner	220	2014/2015 season (100%)	0	0	0	0	0
103	GRE	Carina Glastris / Nicholas Lettner	220	2013/2014 season (70%)	48	104	68	0	0
104	BLR	Emilia Kalehanava / Uladzislau Palkhouski	217	2015/2016 season (100%)	0	120	97	0	0
104	BLR	Emilia Kalehanava / Uladzislau Palkhouski	217	2014/2015 season (100%)	0	0	0	0	0
104	BLR	Emilia Kalehanava / Uladzislau Palkhouski	217	2013/2014 season (70%)	0	0	0	0	0
105	CAN	Valerie Taillefer / Jason Chan	216	2015/2016 season (100%)	0	108	0	0	0
105	CAN	Valerie Taillefer / Jason Chan	216	2014/2015 season (100%)	0	108	0	0	0
105	CAN	Valerie Taillefer / Jason Chan	216	2013/2014 season (70%)	0	0	0	0	0
106	NOR	Thea Rabe / Timothy Koleto	203	2015/2016 season (100%)	0	0	0	203	0
106	NOR	Thea Rabe / Timothy Koleto	203	2014/2015 season (100%)	0	0	0	0	0
106	NOR	Thea Rabe / Timothy Koleto	203	2013/2014 season (70%)	0	0	0	0	0
106	USA	Karina Manta / Joseph Johnson	203	2015/2016 season (100%)	0	0	0	203	0
106	USA	Karina Manta / Joseph Johnson	203	2014/2015 season (100%)	0	0	0	0	0
106	USA	Karina Manta / Joseph Johnson	203	2013/2014 season (70%)	0	0	0	0	0
106	GBR	Carter Marie Jones / Richard Sharpe	203	2015/2016 season (100%)	0	0	0	203	0
106	GBR	Carter Marie Jones / Richard Sharpe	203	2014/2015 season (100%)	0	0	0	0	0
106	GBR	Carter Marie Jones / Richard Sharpe	203	2013/2014 season (70%)	0	0	0	0	0
109	ITA	Victoria Manni / Saverio Giacomelli	182	2015/2016 season (100%)	0	0	0	182	0
109	ITA	Victoria Manni / Saverio Giacomelli	182	2014/2015 season (100%)	0	0	0	0	0
109	ITA	Victoria Manni / Saverio Giacomelli	182	2013/2014 season (70%)	0	0	0	0	0
109	RUS	Ksenia Konkina / Georgy Reviya	182	2015/2016 season (100%)	0	182	0	0	0
109	RUS	Ksenia Konkina / Georgy Reviya	182	2014/2015 season (100%)	0	0	0	0	0
109	RUS	Ksenia Konkina / Georgy Reviya	182	2013/2014 season (70%)	0	0	0	0	0
109	USA	Charlotte Maxwell / Ryan Devereaux	182	2015/2016 season (100%)	0	0	0	182	0
109	USA	Charlotte Maxwell / Ryan Devereaux	182	2014/2015 season (100%)	0	0	0	0	0
109	USA	Charlotte Maxwell / Ryan Devereaux	182	2013/2014 season (70%)	0	0	0	0	0
112	LTU	Taylor Tran / Saulius Ambrulevičius	178	2015/2016 season (100%)	0	0	0	178	0
112	LTU	Taylor Tran / Saulius Ambrulevičius	178	2014/2015 season (100%)	0	0	0	0	0
112	LTU	Taylor Tran / Saulius Ambrulevičius	178	2013/2014 season (70%)	0	0	0	0	0
113	AUS	Matilda Friend / William Badaoui	173	2015/2016 season (100%)	173	0	0	0	0
113	AUS	Matilda Friend / William Badaoui	173	2014/2015 season (100%)	0	0	0	0	0
113	AUS	Matilda Friend / William Badaoui	173	2013/2014 season (70%)	0	0	0	0	0
114	CHN	Xiaoyang Yu / Chen Wang	165	2015/2016 season (100%)	0	0	0	0	0
114	CHN	Xiaoyang Yu / Chen Wang	165	2014/2015 season (100%)	0	0	0	0	0
114	CHN	Xiaoyang Yu / Chen Wang	165	2013/2014 season (70%)	0	165	0	0	0
115	USA	Alissandra Aronow / Collin Brubaker	164	2015/2016 season (100%)	0	0	0	164	0
115	USA	Alissandra Aronow / Collin Brubaker	164	2014/2015 season (100%)	0	0	0	0	0
115	USA	Alissandra Aronow / Collin Brubaker	164	2013/2014 season (70%)	0	0	0	0	0
115	POL	Anna Postrybailo / Edwin Siwkowski	164	2015/2016 season (100%)	0	0	0	0	0
115	POL	Anna Postrybailo / Edwin Siwkowski	164	2014/2015 season (100%)	0	0	0	164	0
115	POL	Anna Postrybailo / Edwin Siwkowski	164	2013/2014 season (70%)	0	0	0	0	0
117	GER	Shari Koch / Christian Nüchtern	158	2015/2016 season (100%)	0	0	0	0	0
117	GER	Shari Koch / Christian Nüchtern	158	2014/2015 season (100%)	0	0	0	0	0
117	GER	Shari Koch / Christian Nüchtern	158	2013/2014 season (70%)	0	0	0	158	0
118	CAN	Haley Sales / Nikolas Wamsteeker	148	2015/2016 season (100%)	0	148	0	0	0
118	CAN	Haley Sales / Nikolas Wamsteeker	148	2014/2015 season (100%)	0	0	0	0	0
118	CAN	Haley Sales / Nikolas Wamsteeker	148	2013/2014 season (70%)	0	0	0	0	0
118	USA	Gigi Becker / Luca Becker	148	2015/2016 season (100%)	0	148	0	0	0
118	USA	Gigi Becker / Luca Becker	148	2014/2015 season (100%)	0	0	0	0	0
118	USA	Gigi Becker / Luca Becker	148	2013/2014 season (70%)	0	0	0	0	0
120	GEO	Angelina Telegina / Otar Japaridze	127	2015/2016 season (100%)	0	0	0	0	0
120	GEO	Angelina Telegina / Otar Japaridze	127	2014/2015 season (100%)	0	0	0	0	0
120	GEO	Angelina Telegina / Otar Japaridze	127	2013/2014 season (70%)	0	0	0	127	0
121	CHN	Yue Zhao / Chang Liu	121	2015/2016 season (100%)	0	0	0	0	0
121	CHN	Yue Zhao / Chang Liu	121	2014/2015 season (100%)	0	0	0	0	0
121	CHN	Yue Zhao / Chang Liu	121	2013/2014 season (70%)	53	68	0	0	0
122	CAN	Ashlynne Stairs / Lee Royer	120	2015/2016 season (100%)	0	120	0	0	0
122	CAN	Ashlynne Stairs / Lee Royer	120	2014/2015 season (100%)	0	0	0	0	0
122	CAN	Ashlynne Stairs / Lee Royer	120	2013/2014 season (70%)	0	0	0	0	0
122	FRA	Adelina Galayavieva / Laurent Abecassis	120	2015/2016 season (100%)	0	120	0	0	0
122	FRA	Adelina Galayavieva / Laurent Abecassis	120	2014/2015 season (100%)	0	0	0	0	0
122	FRA	Adelina Galayavieva / Laurent Abecassis	120	2013/2014 season (70%)	0	0	0	0	0
124	UKR	Nadezhda Frolenkova / Vitali Nikiforov	115	2015/2016 season (100%)	0	0	0	0	0
124	UKR	Nadezhda Frolenkova / Vitali Nikiforov	115	2014/2015 season (100%)	0	0	0	0	0
124	UKR	Nadezhda Frolenkova / Vitali Nikiforov	115	2013/2014 season (70%)	0	0	0	115	0
124	RUS	Valeria Zenkova / Valerie Sinitsin	115	2015/2016 season (100%)	0	0	0	0	0
124	RUS	Valeria Zenkova / Valerie Sinitsin	115	2014/2015 season (100%)	0	0	0	0	0
124	RUS	Valeria Zenkova / Valerie Sinitsin	115	2013/2014 season (70%)	0	0	0	115	0
124	UKR	Anastasia Galyeta / Avidan Brown	115	2015/2016 season (100%)	0	0	0	0	0
124	UKR	Anastasia Galyeta / Avidan Brown	115	2014/2015 season (100%)	0	0	0	0	0
124	UKR	Anastasia Galyeta / Avidan Brown	115	2013/2014 season (70%)	0	0	0	115	0
127	UKR	Angelina Sinkevych / Yegor Yegorov	108	2015/2016 season (100%)	0	108	0	0	0
127	UKR	Angelina Sinkevych / Yegor Yegorov	108	2014/2015 season (100%)	0	0	0	0	0
127	UKR	Angelina Sinkevych / Yegor Yegorov	108	2013/2014 season (70%)	0	0	0	0	0
127	ISR	Kimberly Berkovich / Ronald Zilberberg	108	2015/2016 season (100%)	0	0	0	0	0
127	ISR	Kimberly Berkovich / Ronald Zilberberg	108	2014/2015 season (100%)	0	108	0	0	0
127	ISR	Kimberly Berkovich / Ronald Zilberberg	108	2013/2014 season (70%)	0	0	0	0	0
127	LTU	Guoste Damuleviciute / Deividas Kizala	108	2015/2016 season (100%)	0	108	0	0	0
127	LTU	Guoste Damuleviciute / Deividas Kizala	108	2014/2015 season (100%)	0	0	0	0	0
127	LTU	Guoste Damuleviciute / Deividas Kizala	108	2013/2014 season (70%)	0	0	0	0	0
130	FRA	Julia Wagret / Mathieu Couyras	97	2015/2016 season (100%)	0	0	0	0	0
130	FRA	Julia Wagret / Mathieu Couyras	97	2014/2015 season (100%)	0	97	0	0	0
130	FRA	Julia Wagret / Mathieu Couyras	97	2013/2014 season (70%)	0	0	0	0	0
130	GBR	Gweneth Sletten / Elliot Verburg	97	2015/2016 season (100%)	0	97	0	0	0
130	GBR	Gweneth Sletten / Elliot Verburg	97	2014/2015 season (100%)	0	0	0	0	0
130	GBR	Gweneth Sletten / Elliot Verburg	97	2013/2014 season (70%)	0	0	0	0	0
130	UKR	Darya Popova / Volodymyr Nakisko	97	2015/2016 season (100%)	0	97	0	0	0
130	UKR	Darya Popova / Volodymyr Nakisko	97	2014/2015 season (100%)	0	0	0	0	0
130	UKR	Darya Popova / Volodymyr Nakisko	97	2013/2014 season (70%)	0	0	0	0	0
130	USA	Eliana Gropman / Ian Somerville	97	2015/2016 season (100%)	0	97	0	0	0
130	USA	Eliana Gropman / Ian Somerville	97	2014/2015 season (100%)	0	0	0	0	0
130	USA	Eliana Gropman / Ian Somerville	97	2013/2014 season (70%)	0	0	0	0	0
130	GBR	Ekaterina Fedyushchenko / Lucas Kitteridge	97	2015/2016 season (100%)	0	97	0	0	0
130	GBR	Ekaterina Fedyushchenko / Lucas Kitteridge	97	2014/2015 season (100%)	0	0	0	0	0
130	GBR	Ekaterina Fedyushchenko / Lucas Kitteridge	97	2013/2014 season (70%)	0	0	0	0	0
130	CZE	Katerina Konickova / Matej Lang	97	2015/2016 season (100%)	0	0	0	0	0
130	CZE	Katerina Konickova / Matej Lang	97	2014/2015 season (100%)	0	97	0	0	0
130	CZE	Katerina Konickova / Matej Lang	97	2013/2014 season (70%)	0	0	0	0	0
136	USA	Tory Patsis / Joseph Johnson	76	2015/2016 season (100%)	0	0	0	0	0
136	USA	Tory Patsis / Joseph Johnson	76	2014/2015 season (100%)	0	0	0	0	0
136	USA	Tory Patsis / Joseph Johnson	76	2013/2014 season (70%)	0	76	0	0	0
137	JPN	Rikako Fukase / Aru Tateno	75	2015/2016 season (100%)	75	0	0	0	0
137	JPN	Rikako Fukase / Aru Tateno	75	2014/2015 season (100%)	0	0	0	0	0
137	JPN	Rikako Fukase / Aru Tateno	75	2013/2014 season (70%)	0	0	0	0	0
138	POL	Alexandra Borisova / Cezary Zawadzki	68	2015/2016 season (100%)	68	0	0	0	0
138	POL	Alexandra Borisova / Cezary Zawadzki	68	2014/2015 season (100%)	0	0	0	0	0
138	POL	Alexandra Borisova / Cezary Zawadzki	68	2013/2014 season (70%)	0	0	0	0	0
138	EST	Marina Elias / Denis Koreline	68	2015/2016 season (100%)	0	0	0	0	0
138	EST	Marina Elias / Denis Koreline	68	2014/2015 season (100%)	68	0	0	0	0
138	EST	Marina Elias / Denis Koreline	68	2013/2014 season (70%)	0	0	0	0	0
140	TUR	Cagla Demirsal / Berk Akalin	65	2015/2016 season (100%)	0	0	0	0	0
140	TUR	Cagla Demirsal / Berk Akalin	65	2014/2015 season (100%)	0	0	0	0	0
140	TUR	Cagla Demirsal / Berk Akalin	65	2013/2014 season (70%)	65	0	0	0	0

== World standings for synchronized skating ==
=== Season-end standings ===
The remainder of this section is a complete list, by level, published by the ISU.

==== Senior Synchronized (49 teams) ====
As of 11 April 2016

Rank	Nation	Team	Points	Season	ISU World Championships (Junior or Senior)	Selected International Competition	
Rank	Nation	Team	Points	Season	Best	Best	2nd Best
1	RUS	Team Paradise	2892	2015/2016 season (100%)	840	400	400
1	RUS	Team Paradise	2892	2014/2015 season (100%)	680	292	0
1	RUS	Team Paradise	2892	2013/2014 season (70%)	428	280	204
2	FIN	Team Rockettes	2848	2015/2016 season (100%)	756	400	360
2	FIN	Team Rockettes	2848	2014/2015 season (100%)	612	360	360
2	FIN	Team Rockettes	2848	2013/2014 season (70%)	476	252	252
3	FIN	Team Marigold Ice Unity	2824	2015/2016 season (100%)	0	400	0
3	FIN	Team Marigold Ice Unity	2824	2014/2015 season (100%)	756	400	400
3	FIN	Team Marigold Ice Unity	2824	2013/2014 season (70%)	588	280	227
4	SWE	Team Surprise	2411	2015/2016 season (100%)	496	400	324
4	SWE	Team Surprise	2411	2014/2015 season (100%)	551	360	0
4	SWE	Team Surprise	2411	2013/2014 season (70%)	386	280	252
5	CAN	Team NEXXICE	2396	2015/2016 season (100%)	446	0	0
5	CAN	Team NEXXICE	2396	2014/2015 season (100%)	840	400	400
5	CAN	Team NEXXICE	2396	2013/2014 season (70%)	529	227	0
6	CAN	Team Les Suprêmes Seniors	2361	2015/2016 season (100%)	551	360	292
6	CAN	Team Les Suprêmes Seniors	2361	2014/2015 season (100%)	496	400	262
6	CAN	Team Les Suprêmes Seniors	2361	2013/2014 season (70%)	347	165	0
7	USA	Team Haydenettes	2229	2015/2016 season (100%)	680	360	0
7	USA	Team Haydenettes	2229	2014/2015 season (100%)	446	324	236
7	USA	Team Haydenettes	2229	2013/2014 season (70%)	312	183	0
8	USA	Team Miami University	2012	2015/2016 season (100%)	362	360	360
8	USA	Team Miami University	2012	2014/2015 season (100%)	402	324	0
8	USA	Team Miami University	2012	2013/2014 season (70%)	0	204	0
9	FIN	Team Unique	1944	2015/2016 season (100%)	612	324	324
9	FIN	Team Unique	1944	2014/2015 season (100%)	0	360	324
9	FIN	Team Unique	1944	2013/2014 season (70%)	0	280	280
10	SWE	Team Boomerang	1750	2015/2016 season (100%)	325	400	292
10	SWE	Team Boomerang	1750	2014/2015 season (100%)	293	213	0
10	SWE	Team Boomerang	1750	2013/2014 season (70%)	253	227	134
11	GER	Team Berlin 1	1729	2015/2016 season (100%)	264	292	262
11	GER	Team Berlin 1	1729	2014/2015 season (100%)	325	324	262
11	GER	Team Berlin 1	1729	2013/2014 season (70%)	166	227	183
12	HUN	Team Passion	1619	2015/2016 season (100%)	192	360	360
12	HUN	Team Passion	1619	2014/2015 season (100%)	156	360	191
12	HUN	Team Passion	1619	2013/2014 season (70%)	109	149	0
13	CZE	Team Olympia	1477	2015/2016 season (100%)	173	324	292
13	CZE	Team Olympia	1477	2014/2015 season (100%)	173	324	191
13	CZE	Team Olympia	1477	2013/2014 season (70%)	121	183	0
14	ITA	Team Hot Shivers	1460	2015/2016 season (100%)	237	262	236
14	ITA	Team Hot Shivers	1460	2014/2015 season (100%)	237	236	213
14	ITA	Team Hot Shivers	1460	2013/2014 season (70%)	228	252	165
15	SUI	Team Cool Dreams	1383	2015/2016 season (100%)	156	324	262
15	SUI	Team Cool Dreams	1383	2014/2015 season (100%)	192	236	213
15	SUI	Team Cool Dreams	1383	2013/2014 season (70%)	134	204	165
16	RUS	Team Tatarstan	1380	2015/2016 season (100%)	402	324	0
16	RUS	Team Tatarstan	1380	2014/2015 season (100%)	362	292	0
16	RUS	Team Tatarstan	1380	2013/2014 season (70%)	281	0	0
17	GER	Team Skating Graces	1249	2015/2016 season (100%)	0	400	236
17	GER	Team Skating Graces	1249	2014/2015 season (100%)	0	400	213
17	GER	Team Skating Graces	1249	2013/2014 season (70%)	0	204	0
18	FRA	Team Zoulous	1244	2015/2016 season (100%)	293	292	262
18	FRA	Team Zoulous	1244	2014/2015 season (100%)	214	0	0
18	FRA	Team Zoulous	1244	2013/2014 season (70%)	150	183	0
19	FIN	Team Revolutions	994	2015/2016 season (100%)	0	262	236
19	FIN	Team Revolutions	994	2014/2015 season (100%)	0	292	191
19	FIN	Team Revolutions	994	2013/2014 season (70%)	0	204	0
20	USA	Team Dearbom Crystallettes	859	2015/2016 season (100%)	0	213	0
20	USA	Team Dearbom Crystallettes	859	2014/2015 season (100%)	0	292	0
20	USA	Team Dearbom Crystallettes	859	2013/2014 season (70%)	205	149	0
21	GBR	Team Spirit	825	2015/2016 season (100%)	0	292	0
21	GBR	Team Spirit	825	2014/2015 season (100%)	102	360	0
21	GBR	Team Spirit	825	2013/2014 season (70%)	71	0	0
22	USA	Team Skyliners	737	2015/2016 season (100%)	0	292	0
22	USA	Team Skyliners	737	2014/2015 season (100%)	0	262	0
22	USA	Team Skyliners	737	2013/2014 season (70%)	0	183	0
23	AUS	Team Nova Seniors	716	2015/2016 season (100%)	113	324	191
23	AUS	Team Nova Seniors	716	2014/2015 season (100%)	0	0	0
23	AUS	Team Nova Seniors	716	2013/2014 season (70%)	88	0	0
24	JPN	Team Jingu Ice Messengers Grace	714	2015/2016 season (100%)	214	236	0
24	JPN	Team Jingu Ice Messengers Grace	714	2014/2015 season (100%)	264	0	0
24	JPN	Team Jingu Ice Messengers Grace	714	2013/2014 season (70%)	185	0	0
25	GBR	Team Zariba	669	2015/2016 season (100%)	83	262	0
25	GBR	Team Zariba	669	2014/2015 season (100%)	0	324	0
25	GBR	Team Zariba	669	2013/2014 season (70%)	0	0	0
26	CZE	Team Balance	639	2015/2016 season (100%)	0	213	213
26	CZE	Team Balance	639	2014/2015 season (100%)	0	213	0
26	CZE	Team Balance	639	2013/2014 season (70%)	0	0	0
27	ITA	Team Shining Blades	621	2015/2016 season (100%)	0	236	0
27	ITA	Team Shining Blades	621	2014/2015 season (100%)	0	236	0
27	ITA	Team Shining Blades	621	2013/2014 season (70%)	0	149	0
28	AUS	Team Ice Storms	584	2015/2016 season (100%)	0	292	0
28	AUS	Team Ice Storms	584	2014/2015 season (100%)	0	292	0
28	AUS	Team Ice Storms	584	2013/2014 season (70%)	0	0	0
29	ITA	Team Flying Angels	554	2015/2016 season (100%)	0	262	0
29	ITA	Team Flying Angels	554	2014/2015 season (100%)	0	292	0
29	ITA	Team Flying Angels	554	2013/2014 season (70%)	0	0	0
30	CRO	Team Zagreb Snowflakes	528	2015/2016 season (100%)	126	262	0
30	CRO	Team Zagreb Snowflakes	528	2014/2015 season (100%)	140	0	0
30	CRO	Team Zagreb Snowflakes	528	2013/2014 season (70%)	98	0	0
31	USA	Team Ice'Kateers	525	2015/2016 season (100%)	0	360	0
31	USA	Team Ice'Kateers	525	2014/2015 season (100%)	0	0	0
31	USA	Team Ice'Kateers	525	2013/2014 season (70%)	0	165	0
32	USA	Team Del Sol	400	2015/2016 season (100%)	0	400	0
32	USA	Team Del Sol	400	2014/2015 season (100%)	0	0	0
32	USA	Team Del Sol	400	2013/2014 season (70%)	0	0	0
33	RUS	Team Crystal	385	2015/2016 season (100%)	0	0	0
33	RUS	Team Crystal	385	2014/2015 season (100%)	0	236	0
33	RUS	Team Crystal	385	2013/2014 season (70%)	0	149	0
34	ESP	Team Fusion	377	2015/2016 season (100%)	102	0	0
34	ESP	Team Fusion	377	2014/2015 season (100%)	126	0	0
34	ESP	Team Fusion	377	2013/2014 season (70%)	64	149	0
35	TUR	Team Turquoise	366	2015/2016 season (100%)	0	0	0
35	TUR	Team Turquoise	366	2014/2015 season (100%)	74	292	0
35	TUR	Team Turquoise	366	2013/2014 season (70%)	0	0	0
36	CAN	Team Meraki	324	2015/2016 season (100%)	0	324	0
36	CAN	Team Meraki	324	2014/2015 season (100%)	0	0	0
36	CAN	Team Meraki	324	2013/2014 season (70%)	0	0	0
37	LAT	Team Amber	287	2015/2016 season (100%)	74	213	0
37	LAT	Team Amber	287	2014/2015 season (100%)	0	0	0
37	LAT	Team Amber	287	2013/2014 season (70%)	0	0	0
38	GBR	Team Moray Dolphins	262	2015/2016 season (100%)	0	0	0
38	GBR	Team Moray Dolphins	262	2014/2015 season (100%)	0	262	0
38	GBR	Team Moray Dolphins	262	2013/2014 season (70%)	0	0	0
39	GBR	Team Wight Jewels Senior	236	2015/2016 season (100%)	0	236	0
39	GBR	Team Wight Jewels Senior	236	2014/2015 season (100%)	0	0	0
39	GBR	Team Wight Jewels Senior	236	2013/2014 season (70%)	0	0	0
40	MEX	Team Merging Edge	232	2015/2016 season (100%)	140	0	0
40	MEX	Team Merging Edge	232	2014/2015 season (100%)	92	0	0
40	MEX	Team Merging Edge	232	2013/2014 season (70%)	79	0	0
41	USA	Team Starlight	227	2015/2016 season (100%)	0	0	0
41	USA	Team Starlight	227	2014/2015 season (100%)	0	0	0
41	USA	Team Starlight	227	2013/2014 season (70%)	0	227	0
42	USA	Team Adrian College	213	2015/2016 season (100%)	0	213	0
42	USA	Team Adrian College	213	2014/2015 season (100%)	0	0	0
42	USA	Team Adrian College	213	2013/2014 season (70%)	0	0	0
42	FRA	Team Black Diam'S Senior	213	2015/2016 season (100%)	0	213	0
42	FRA	Team Black Diam'S Senior	213	2014/2015 season (100%)	0	0	0
42	FRA	Team Black Diam'S Senior	213	2013/2014 season (70%)	0	0	0
44	GER	Team United Angels	191	2015/2016 season (100%)	0	0	0
44	GER	Team United Angels	191	2014/2015 season (100%)	0	191	0
44	GER	Team United Angels	191	2013/2014 season (70%)	0	0	0
45	BEL	Team Temptation	175	2015/2016 season (100%)	92	0	0
45	BEL	Team Temptation	175	2014/2015 season (100%)	83	0	0
45	BEL	Team Temptation	175	2013/2014 season (70%)	58	0	0
46	RUS	Team Dream Team	165	2015/2016 season (100%)	0	0	0
46	RUS	Team Dream Team	165	2014/2015 season (100%)	0	0	0
46	RUS	Team Dream Team	165	2013/2014 season (70%)	0	165	0
47	FRA	Team Atlantides	134	2015/2016 season (100%)	0	0	0
47	FRA	Team Atlantides	134	2014/2015 season (100%)	0	0	0
47	FRA	Team Atlantides	134	2013/2014 season (70%)	0	134	0
47	SUI	Team Starlight 2	134	2015/2016 season (100%)	0	0	0
47	SUI	Team Starlight 2	134	2014/2015 season (100%)	0	0	0
47	SUI	Team Starlight 2	134	2013/2014 season (70%)	0	134	0
49	AUS	Team Infusion	113	2015/2016 season (100%)	0	0	0
49	AUS	Team Infusion	113	2014/2015 season (100%)	113	0	0
49	AUS	Team Infusion	113	2013/2014 season (70%)	0	0	0

==== Junior Synchronized (67 teams) ====
As of 14 March 2016

Rank	Nation	Team	Points	Season	ISU World Championships (Junior or Senior)	Selected International Competition	
Rank	Nation	Team	Points	Season	Best	Best	2nd Best
1	CAN	Team Les Suprêmes Junior	1728	2015/2016 season (100%)	600	250	0
1	CAN	Team Les Suprêmes Junior	1728	2014/2015 season (100%)	486	250	0
1	CAN	Team Les Suprêmes Junior	1728	2013/2014 season (70%)	378	142	0
2	FIN	Team Fintastic Junior	1683	2015/2016 season (100%)	540	225	0
2	FIN	Team Fintastic Junior	1683	2014/2015 season (100%)	540	203	0
2	FIN	Team Fintastic Junior	1683	2013/2014 season (70%)	420	175	0
3	FIN	Team Musketeers Junior	1596	2015/2016 season (100%)	394	225	0
3	FIN	Team Musketeers Junior	1596	2014/2015 season (100%)	600	250	0
3	FIN	Team Musketeers Junior	1596	2013/2014 season (70%)	340	127	0
4	USA	Team Skyliners Junior	1501	2015/2016 season (100%)	437	250	203
4	USA	Team Skyliners Junior	1501	2014/2015 season (100%)	354	164	0
4	USA	Team Skyliners Junior	1501	2013/2014 season (70%)	0	93	0
5	RUS	Team Crystal Ice Junior	1449	2015/2016 season (100%)	354	250	0
5	RUS	Team Crystal Ice Junior	1449	2014/2015 season (100%)	437	250	0
5	RUS	Team Crystal Ice Junior	1449	2013/2014 season (70%)	0	158	0
6	SWE	Team Convivium Junior	1358	2015/2016 season (100%)	209	203	164
6	SWE	Team Convivium Junior	1358	2014/2015 season (100%)	232	250	203
6	SWE	Team Convivium Junior	1358	2013/2014 season (70%)	306	104	0
7	SWE	Team Spirit Junior	1329	2015/2016 season (100%)	258	225	203
7	SWE	Team Spirit Junior	1329	2014/2015 season (100%)	258	203	182
7	SWE	Team Spirit Junior	1329	2013/2014 season (70%)	132	142	0
8	CAN	Team NEXXICE Junior	1258	2015/2016 season (100%)	287	225	0
8	CAN	Team NEXXICE Junior	1258	2014/2015 season (100%)	394	225	0
8	CAN	Team NEXXICE Junior	1258	2013/2014 season (70%)	0	127	0
9	USA	Team Lexettes Junior	1140	2015/2016 season (100%)	319	225	0
9	USA	Team Lexettes Junior	1140	2014/2015 season (100%)	287	225	0
9	USA	Team Lexettes Junior	1140	2013/2014 season (70%)	223	84	0
10	RUS	Team Spartak-Junost Junior	1123	2015/2016 season (100%)	486	0	0
10	RUS	Team Spartak-Junost Junior	1123	2014/2015 season (100%)	319	225	0
10	RUS	Team Spartak-Junost Junior	1123	2013/2014 season (70%)	248	93	0
11	GER	Team Berlin Junior	1016	2015/2016 season (100%)	232	120	0
11	GER	Team Berlin Junior	1016	2014/2015 season (100%)	209	164	164
11	GER	Team Berlin Junior	1016	2013/2014 season (70%)	181	127	115
12	ITA	Team Hot Shivers Junior	953	2015/2016 season (100%)	169	182	133
12	ITA	Team Hot Shivers Junior	953	2014/2015 season (100%)	188	148	133
12	ITA	Team Hot Shivers Junior	953	2013/2014 season (70%)	146	104	0
13	USA	Team Chicago Jazz Junior	878	2015/2016 season (100%)	0	250	250
13	USA	Team Chicago Jazz Junior	878	2014/2015 season (100%)	0	148	0
13	USA	Team Chicago Jazz Junior	878	2013/2014 season (70%)	162	68	0
14	SUI	Team Cool Dreams Junior	846	2015/2016 season (100%)	153	148	148
14	SUI	Team Cool Dreams Junior	846	2014/2015 season (100%)	169	120	108
14	SUI	Team Cool Dreams Junior	846	2013/2014 season (70%)	87	93	0
15	CAN	Team Les Pirouettes De Laval Junior	818	2015/2016 season (100%)	0	164	0
15	CAN	Team Les Pirouettes De Laval Junior	818	2014/2015 season (100%)	0	203	0
15	CAN	Team Les Pirouettes De Laval Junior	818	2013/2014 season (70%)	276	175	0
16	FIN	Team Mystique Junior	565	2015/2016 season (100%)	0	182	0
16	FIN	Team Mystique Junior	565	2014/2015 season (100%)	0	225	0
16	FIN	Team Mystique Junior	565	2013/2014 season (70%)	0	158	0
17	FIN	Team Dream Edges Junior	539	2015/2016 season (100%)	0	182	0
17	FIN	Team Dream Edges Junior	539	2014/2015 season (100%)	0	182	0
17	FIN	Team Dream Edges Junior	539	2013/2014 season (70%)	0	175	0
18	GER	Team Starlets Junior 2	528	2015/2016 season (100%)	0	250	0
18	GER	Team Starlets Junior 2	528	2014/2015 season (100%)	0	120	0
18	GER	Team Starlets Junior 2	528	2013/2014 season (70%)	0	158	0
19	FIN	Team Reflections Junior	512	2015/2016 season (100%)	0	182	148
19	FIN	Team Reflections Junior	512	2014/2015 season (100%)	0	182	0
19	FIN	Team Reflections Junior	512	2013/2014 season (70%)	0	0	0
20	FIN	Team Sun City Swing Junior	493	2015/2016 season (100%)	0	203	0
20	FIN	Team Sun City Swing Junior	493	2014/2015 season (100%)	0	148	0
20	FIN	Team Sun City Swing Junior	493	2013/2014 season (70%)	0	142	0
21	FIN	Team Valley Bay Synchro Junior	490	2015/2016 season (100%)	0	133	0
21	FIN	Team Valley Bay Synchro Junior	490	2014/2015 season (100%)	0	182	0
21	FIN	Team Valley Bay Synchro Junior	490	2013/2014 season (70%)	0	175	0
22	FIN	Team Stella Polaris Junior	466	2015/2016 season (100%)	0	148	0
22	FIN	Team Stella Polaris Junior	466	2014/2015 season (100%)	0	203	0
22	FIN	Team Stella Polaris Junior	466	2013/2014 season (70%)	0	115	0
23	RUS	Team Idel Junior	451	2015/2016 season (100%)	0	0	0
23	RUS	Team Idel Junior	451	2014/2015 season (100%)	0	250	0
23	RUS	Team Idel Junior	451	2013/2014 season (70%)	201	0	0
24	CZE	Team Darlings Junior	433	2015/2016 season (100%)	188	108	0
24	CZE	Team Darlings Junior	433	2014/2015 season (100%)	137	0	0
24	CZE	Team Darlings Junior	433	2013/2014 season (70%)	0	0	0
25	ESP	Team Mirum Junior	418	2015/2016 season (100%)	100	120	0
25	ESP	Team Mirum Junior	418	2014/2015 season (100%)	90	108	0
25	ESP	Team Mirum Junior	418	2013/2014 season (70%)	0	0	0
26	ITA	Team Ladybirds Junior	411	2015/2016 season (100%)	0	133	0
26	ITA	Team Ladybirds Junior	411	2014/2015 season (100%)	0	97	97
26	ITA	Team Ladybirds Junior	411	2013/2014 season (70%)	0	84	0
27	FIN	Team Fireblades Junior	407	2015/2016 season (100%)	0	182	0
27	FIN	Team Fireblades Junior	407	2014/2015 season (100%)	0	225	0
27	FIN	Team Fireblades Junior	407	2013/2014 season (70%)	0	0	0
28	FIN	Team Ice Steps Junior	401	2015/2016 season (100%)	0	164	0
28	FIN	Team Ice Steps Junior	401	2014/2015 season (100%)	0	133	0
28	FIN	Team Ice Steps Junior	401	2013/2014 season (70%)	0	104	0
29	GBR	Team Icicles Juniors	387	2015/2016 season (100%)	137	97	0
29	GBR	Team Icicles Juniors	387	2014/2015 season (100%)	153	0	0
29	GBR	Team Icicles Juniors	387	2013/2014 season (70%)	107	0	0
30	FRA	Team Black Diam'S Junior	362	2015/2016 season (100%)	0	0	0
30	FRA	Team Black Diam'S Junior	362	2014/2015 season (100%)	124	120	0
30	FRA	Team Black Diam'S Junior	362	2013/2014 season (70%)	118	0	0
31	SWE	Team Moonlights Junior	361	2015/2016 season (100%)	0	133	0
31	SWE	Team Moonlights Junior	361	2014/2015 season (100%)	0	120	108
31	SWE	Team Moonlights Junior	361	2013/2014 season (70%)	0	0	0
32	CRO	Team Zagreb Snowflakes Junior	353	2015/2016 season (100%)	111	0	0
32	CRO	Team Zagreb Snowflakes Junior	353	2014/2015 season (100%)	100	0	0
32	CRO	Team Zagreb Snowflakes Junior	353	2013/2014 season (70%)	0	142	0
33	ITA	Team Ice On Fire Junior	340	2015/2016 season (100%)	0	164	0
33	ITA	Team Ice On Fire Junior	340	2014/2015 season (100%)	0	108	0
33	ITA	Team Ice On Fire Junior	340	2013/2014 season (70%)	0	68	0
34	SWE	Team Rhapsody Junior	298	2015/2016 season (100%)	0	0	0
34	SWE	Team Rhapsody Junior	298	2014/2015 season (100%)	0	133	97
34	SWE	Team Rhapsody Junior	298	2013/2014 season (70%)	0	68	0
35	USA	Team Hockettes Junior	297	2015/2016 season (100%)	0	0	0
35	USA	Team Hockettes Junior	297	2014/2015 season (100%)	0	182	0
35	USA	Team Hockettes Junior	297	2013/2014 season (70%)	0	115	0
36	HUN	Team Mixed Ice Formation Junior	284	2015/2016 season (100%)	0	203	0
36	HUN	Team Mixed Ice Formation Junior	284	2014/2015 season (100%)	81	0	0
36	HUN	Team Mixed Ice Formation Junior	284	2013/2014 season (70%)	0	0	0
37	SWE	Team Seaside Junior	268	2015/2016 season (100%)	0	0	0
37	SWE	Team Seaside Junior	268	2014/2015 season (100%)	0	148	120
37	SWE	Team Seaside Junior	268	2013/2014 season (70%)	0	0	0
38	FIN	Team Estreija Junior	240	2015/2016 season (100%)	0	0	0
38	FIN	Team Estreija Junior	240	2014/2015 season (100%)	0	164	0
38	FIN	Team Estreija Junior	240	2013/2014 season (70%)	0	76	0
38	ITA	Team Ice Diamonds Junior	240	2015/2016 season (100%)	0	120	120
38	ITA	Team Ice Diamonds Junior	240	2014/2015 season (100%)	0	0	0
38	ITA	Team Ice Diamonds Junior	240	2013/2014 season (70%)	0	0	0
40	CZE	Team Starlets Junior	225	2015/2016 season (100%)	0	225	0
40	CZE	Team Starlets Junior	225	2014/2015 season (100%)	0	0	0
40	CZE	Team Starlets Junior	225	2013/2014 season (70%)	0	0	0
41	USA	Team Saint Louis Synergy Junior	217	2015/2016 season (100%)	0	0	0
41	USA	Team Saint Louis Synergy Junior	217	2014/2015 season (100%)	0	133	0
41	USA	Team Saint Louis Synergy Junior	217	2013/2014 season (70%)	0	84	0
42	FRA	Team Cometes Junior	216	2015/2016 season (100%)	0	108	0
42	FRA	Team Cometes Junior	216	2014/2015 season (100%)	0	108	0
42	FRA	Team Cometes Junior	216	2013/2014 season (70%)	0	0	0
43	USA	Team Fond du Lac Blades Junior	203	2015/2016 season (100%)	0	203	0
43	USA	Team Fond du Lac Blades Junior	203	2014/2015 season (100%)	0	0	0
43	USA	Team Fond du Lac Blades Junior	203	2013/2014 season (70%)	0	0	0
44	ITA	Team Shining Blades Junior	182	2015/2016 season (100%)	0	182	0
44	ITA	Team Shining Blades Junior	182	2014/2015 season (100%)	0	0	0
44	ITA	Team Shining Blades Junior	182	2013/2014 season (70%)	0	0	0
45	CZE	Team Kometa Junior	172	2015/2016 season (100%)	0	0	0
45	CZE	Team Kometa Junior	172	2014/2015 season (100%)	0	0	0
45	CZE	Team Kometa Junior	172	2013/2014 season (70%)	96	76	0
46	RUS	Team Sunrise 1 Junior	164	2015/2016 season (100%)	0	164	0
46	RUS	Team Sunrise 1 Junior	164	2014/2015 season (100%)	0	0	0
46	RUS	Team Sunrise 1 Junior	164	2013/2014 season (70%)	0	0	0
47	USA	Team Braemar Junior	158	2015/2016 season (100%)	0	0	0
47	USA	Team Braemar Junior	158	2014/2015 season (100%)	0	0	0
47	USA	Team Braemar Junior	158	2013/2014 season (70%)	0	158	0
48	SWE	Team Nova Junior	148	2015/2016 season (100%)	0	148	0
48	SWE	Team Nova Junior	148	2014/2015 season (100%)	0	0	0
48	SWE	Team Nova Junior	148	2013/2014 season (70%)	0	0	0
48	USA	Team Synchroettes Junior	148	2015/2016 season (100%)	0	0	0
48	USA	Team Synchroettes Junior	148	2014/2015 season (100%)	0	148	0
48	USA	Team Synchroettes Junior	148	2013/2014 season (70%)	0	0	0
50	BEL	Team Temptation Junior	136	2015/2016 season (100%)	0	0	0
50	BEL	Team Temptation Junior	136	2014/2015 season (100%)	73	0	0
50	BEL	Team Temptation Junior	136	2013/2014 season (70%)	63	0	0
51	SUI	Team United Blades Juniors	133	2015/2016 season (100%)	0	133	0
51	SUI	Team United Blades Juniors	133	2014/2015 season (100%)	0	0	0
51	SUI	Team United Blades Juniors	133	2013/2014 season (70%)	0	0	0
52	HUN	Team Black Rose Junior	127	2015/2016 season (100%)	0	0	0
52	HUN	Team Black Rose Junior	127	2014/2015 season (100%)	0	0	0
52	HUN	Team Black Rose Junior	127	2013/2014 season (70%)	0	127	0
53	HUN	Diamond Laces Frostwork Junior	124	2015/2016 season (100%)	124	0	0
53	HUN	Diamond Laces Frostwork Junior	124	2014/2015 season (100%)	0	0	0
53	HUN	Diamond Laces Frostwork Junior	124	2013/2014 season (70%)	0	0	0
54	FRA	Team Jeanne D'Arc Junior	120	2015/2016 season (100%)	0	120	0
54	FRA	Team Jeanne D'Arc Junior	120	2014/2015 season (100%)	0	0	0
54	FRA	Team Jeanne D'Arc Junior	120	2013/2014 season (70%)	0	0	0
55	HUN	Team Sportorszag Junior	115	2015/2016 season (100%)	0	0	0
55	HUN	Team Sportorszag Junior	115	2014/2015 season (100%)	0	0	0
55	HUN	Team Sportorszag Junior	115	2013/2014 season (70%)	0	115	0
56	AUS	Team Iceskateers Elite Juniors	111	2015/2016 season (100%)	0	0	0
56	AUS	Team Iceskateers Elite Juniors	111	2014/2015 season (100%)	111	0	0
56	AUS	Team Iceskateers Elite Juniors	111	2013/2014 season (70%)	0	0	0
57	CHN	Team C-Star Junior	108	2015/2016 season (100%)	0	108	0
57	CHN	Team C-Star Junior	108	2014/2015 season (100%)	0	0	0
57	CHN	Team C-Star Junior	108	2013/2014 season (70%)	0	0	0
58	CZE	Team Orion Junior	97	2015/2016 season (100%)	0	0	0
58	CZE	Team Orion Junior	97	2014/2015 season (100%)	0	97	0
58	CZE	Team Orion Junior	97	2013/2014 season (70%)	0	0	0
58	FRA	Team Zazou Junior	97	2015/2016 season (100%)	0	97	0
58	FRA	Team Zazou Junior	97	2014/2015 season (100%)	0	0	0
58	FRA	Team Zazou Junior	97	2013/2014 season (70%)	0	0	0
60	NED	Team Illuminettes Junior	90	2015/2016 season (100%)	90	0	0
60	NED	Team Illuminettes Junior	90	2014/2015 season (100%)	0	0	0
60	NED	Team Illuminettes Junior	90	2013/2014 season (70%)	0	0	0
61	TUR	Team Anatolia Junior	81	2015/2016 season (100%)	81	0	0
61	TUR	Team Anatolia Junior	81	2014/2015 season (100%)	0	0	0
61	TUR	Team Anatolia Junior	81	2013/2014 season (70%)	0	0	0
62	AUT	Team Sweet Mozart Junior	78	2015/2016 season (100%)	0	0	0
62	AUT	Team Sweet Mozart Junior	78	2014/2015 season (100%)	0	0	0
62	AUT	Team Sweet Mozart Junior	78	2013/2014 season (70%)	78	0	0
63	CAN	Team Synergy Junior	76	2015/2016 season (100%)	0	0	0
63	CAN	Team Synergy Junior	76	2014/2015 season (100%)	0	0	0
63	CAN	Team Synergy Junior	76	2013/2014 season (70%)	0	76	0
64	HUN	Team Jeges-Vegyes Budapest Junior	70	2015/2016 season (100%)	0	0	0
64	HUN	Team Jeges-Vegyes Budapest Junior	70	2014/2015 season (100%)	0	0	0
64	HUN	Team Jeges-Vegyes Budapest Junior	70	2013/2014 season (70%)	70	0	0
65	LAT	Team Amber Junior	66	2015/2016 season (100%)	0	0	0
65	LAT	Team Amber Junior	66	2014/2015 season (100%)	66	0	0
65	LAT	Team Amber Junior	66	2013/2014 season (70%)	0	0	0
66	RSA	Team Rainbow Junior	59	2015/2016 season (100%)	0	0	0
66	RSA	Team Rainbow Junior	59	2014/2015 season (100%)	59	0	0
66	RSA	Team Rainbow Junior	59	2013/2014 season (70%)	0	0	0
67	TUR	Team Turkuaz Junior	53	2015/2016 season (100%)	0	0	0
67	TUR	Team Turkuaz Junior	53	2014/2015 season (100%)	53	0	0
67	TUR	Team Turkuaz Junior	53	2013/2014 season (70%)	0	0	0

== See also ==
- 2015–16 Season's World Ranking
- ISU World Standings
- ISU Season's World Ranking
- 2015–16 figure skating season
- 2015–16 synchronized skating season
