= List of flag bearers for the Philippines at the Olympics =

Philippines at the Olympics
- Flag of the Philippines
- IOC code: PHI
- NOC: Philippine Olympic Committee
- Website: www.olympic.ph
- Medals: Gold 3 Silver 5 Bronze 10 Total 18

Summer appearances
- 1924; 1928; 1932; 1936; 1948; 1952; 1956; 1960; 1964; 1968; 1972; 1976; 1980; 1984; 1988; 1992; 1996; 2000; 2004; 2008; 2012; 2016; 2020; 2024; 2028

Winter appearances
- 1972; 1976–1984; 1988; 1992; 1994–2010; 2014; 2018; 2022; 2026

This is a list of flag bearers who have represented the Philippines at the Olympics. The delegation has participated in all Olympic Games since 1924, having a total of 58 events with 408 participants in the Olympic Games and the 27 participants in the Youth Olympic Games. Flag bearers carry the national flag of their country at the opening and closing ceremonies of the Olympic Games, similar to a team captain. The flag bearer is either chosen by the respective Olympic Committee or their teammates.

David Nepomuceno served as the first flag bearer for the Philippines in the 1924 Olympics in Paris.

== List ==
Key:

Born outside the Philippines

=== Opening ceremony ===
#	Event year	Season	Flag bearer	Hometown	Sport	Ref.
1	1924	Summer	David Nepomuceno	Albay	Athletics	
2	1928	Summer	Anselmo Gonzaga	No information available	Athletics	
3	1932	Summer	No information available			
4	1936	Summer	Simeon Toribio	Zamboanga del Sur	Athletics	
5	1948	Summer	Francisco Vestil	Cebu	Basketball	
6	1952	Summer	Ramon Campos Jr.	Iloilo City	Basketball	
7	1956	Summer	Gertrudez Lozada	No information available	Swimming	
8	1960	Summer	No information available			
9	1964	Summer	Manfredo Alipala	Bacolod	Boxing	
10	1968	Summer	No information available			
11	1972	Winter	No information available			
12	1972	Summer	Jimmy Mariano	Rizal	Basketball	
13	1976	Summer	Gerardo Rosario	Ilocos Sur	Swimming	
14	1984	Summer	Isidro del Prado	Sorsogon	Athletics	
15	1988	Winter	Raymond Ocampo	Pampanga	Luge	
16	1988	Summer	Eric Buhain	Metro Manila	Swimming	
17	1992	Winter	Michael Teruel	New York, United States	Alpine skiing	
18	1992	Summer	Arlo Chavez	Cebu	Boxing	
19	1996	Summer	Reynaldo Galido	Negros Occidental	Boxing	
20	2000	Summer	Donald Geisler	Pampanga	Taekwondo	
21	2004	Summer	Romeo Brin (Note: Originally assigned to Christopher Camat but was replaced by fellow boxer Brin as Camat was scheduled to compete the day after the opening ceremony.)	Palawan	Boxing	
22	2008	Summer	Manny Pacquiao (Note: Pacquiao, a professional boxer, is a non-participant in the Olympic Games.)	South Cotabato	Boxing	
23	2012	Summer	Hidilyn Diaz	Zamboanga del Sur	Weightlifting	
24	2014	Winter	Michael Christian Martinez	Metro Manila	Figure skating	
25	2016	Summer	Ian Lariba	Misamis Oriental	Table tennis	
26	2018	Winter	Asa Miller	Oregon, United States	Alpine Skiing	
27	2020	Summer	Eumir Marcial (Note: EJ Obiena was originally chosen, but he was replaced due to the introduction of a new protocol requiring flagbearers to be in Tokyo 48 hours prior to the opening ceremony. Obiena is scheduled to arrived on 23 July, on the very day of the opening ceremony itself.)	Zamboanga del Sur	Boxing	
27	2020	Summer	Kiyomi Watanabe	Cebu	Judo	
28	2022	Winter	Asa Miller	Oregon, United States	Alpine Skiing	
29	2024	Summer	Carlo Paalam	Bukidnon	Boxing	
29	2024	Summer	Nesthy Petecio	Davao del Sur	Boxing	
30	2026	Winter	Francis Ceccarelli	Metro Manila	Alpine Skiing	
30	2026	Winter	Tallulah Proulx	California, United States	Alpine Skiing	

=== Closing ceremony ===
#	Event year	Season	Flag bearer	Hometown	Sport	Ref.
	2004	Summer	Tshomlee Go	Camarines Sur	Taekwondo	
	2008	Summer	Miguel Molina	Metro Manila	Swimming	
	2012	Summer	Jasmine Alkhaldi	Metro Manila	Swimming	
	2016	Summer	Kirstie Alora	Laguna	Taekwondo	
	2018	Winter	Asa Miller	Oregon, United States	Alpine Skiing	
	2020	Summer	Nesthy Petecio	Davao del Sur	Boxing	
	2022	Winter	Asa Miller	Oregon, United States	Alpine Skiing	
	2024	Summer	Carlos Yulo	Metro Manila	Gymnastics	
	2024	Summer	Aira Villegas	Leyte	Boxing	

=== Youth Games ===
#	Event year	Season	Flag bearer	Hometown	Sport	Ref.
1	2010	Summer	Patricia Llena	Nueva Ecija	Weightlifting	
2	2012	Winter	Abel Tesfamariam	Switzerland	Alpine Skiing	
3	2014	Summer	Luis Gabriel Moreno	Metro Manila	Archery	
4	2018	Summer	Yuka Saso	Bulacan	Golf	
5	2020	Winter	Ana Noelle Wahleithner	United States	Alpine Skiing	
6	2024	Winter	Laetaz Rabe	Switzerland	Freestyle Skiing	

== See also ==
- Philippines at the Olympics
