= Philippines at the 2026 Winter Olympics =

- Flag of the Philippines
- IOC code: PHI
- NOC: Philippine Olympic Committee
- Website: www.olympic.ph

in Milan and Cortina d'Ampezzo, Italy 6 February 2026 – 22 February 2026
- Competitors: 2 (1 man and 1 woman) in 1 sport
- Flag bearers (opening): Francis Ceccarelli & Tallulah Proulx
- Flag bearers (closing): Francis Ceccarelli & Tallulah Proulx
- Officials: Jezreel Gaius Apelar, Chef de Mission
- Medals: Gold 0 Silver 0 Bronze 0 Total 0

Winter Olympics appearances (overview)
- 1972; 1976–1984; 1988; 1992; 1994–2010; 2014; 2018; 2022; 2026

The Philippines competed at the 2026 Winter Olympics in Milan and Cortina d'Ampezzo, Italy, from 6 to 22 February 2026. This marks the Philippines' fourth consecutive appearance in the Winter Olympics since 2014. The delegation was represented by two alpine skiers including the first ever female Olympian to represent the country in the Winter Olympics.

== Background ==
The Philippines made its fourth consecutive appearance in the Winter Olympics since the 2014 edition in Sochi, Russia. This is the country's seventh overall appearance since the 1972 edition.

=== Qualification ===
The Philippines qualified two alpine skiers, Francis Ceccarelli and Tallulah Proulx. Proulx will become the first female athlete to represent the Philippines at the Winter Olympics. She is also the second youngest (Note: Initial sources erroneously named her as the youngest Winter Olympian for the Philippines. Asa Miller was a roughly a month younger when he skied for the Philippines at the 2018 Winter Olympics in Pyeongchang.: Talulah Proulx (born 8 May 2008) – 17 years, 8 months old on 6 February 2026 (2026 Winter Olympics opening ceremony); Asa Miller (born 14 June 2000) – 17 years, 7 months old on 9 February 2018 (2018 Winter Olympics opening ceremony)) athlete who competed for the Philippines at the Winter Olympics. Philippine Ski and Snowboard Federation (PSSF) Secretary General Jezreel Apelar was the Chef de Mission of the delegation.

A notable Olympic qualification run was made by the men's curling team where they won the Pre-Olympic Qualification Event, but failed to finish in the top two teams at the subsequent Curling Olympic Qualification Event, missing out on a chance to reach the Olympics.

=== Expectations ===
PSSF president Jim Apelar states there are no expectations for the delegation to win a medal but expressed hope that the two skiers could lead diaspora Filipinos winning a medal in future editions. Philippine Olympic Committee (POC) president Abraham Tolentino was more optimistic, citing the Philippines winning three gold medals across the 2020 and 2024 Summer Olympics proof that "it can be done" despite the country not having won a medal in the Winter Olympics.

=== Opening ceremony ===
At the opening ceremony on 6 February, Ceccarelli served as the Philippines' flag bearer in Valtellina while Proulx fulfilled the similar role in Cortina. This marks the first time that the Parade of Nations was spread out in multiple locations in Olympic history

== Competitors ==
The Philippines have qualified one man and one woman in a single sport or discipline – Alpine skiing.

Sport	Men	Women	Total
Alpine skiing	1	1	2
Total	1	1	2

== Alpine skiing ==
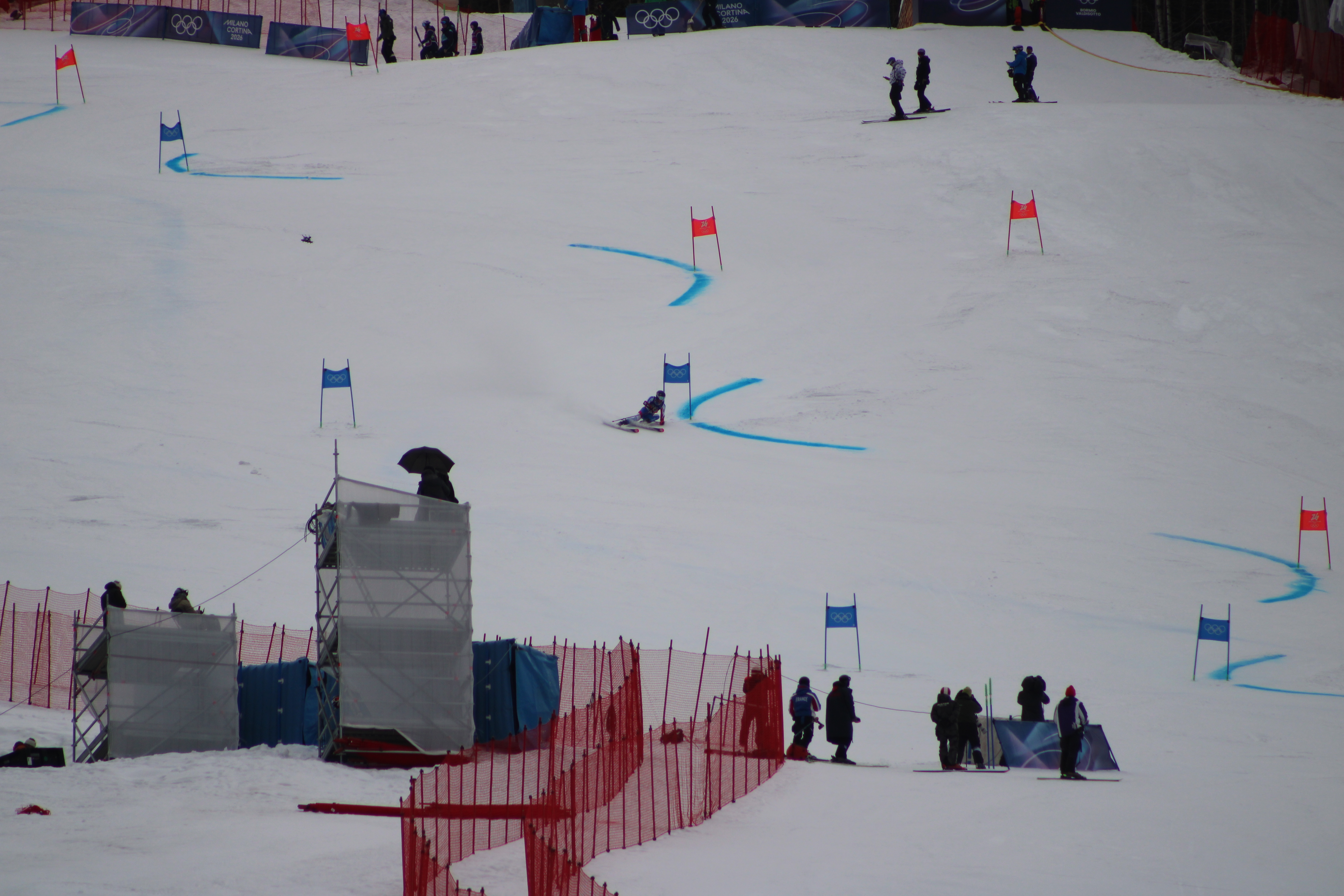
The Stelvio ski course in Bormio during the men's giant slalom event. February 14, 2026

The Philippines qualified Francis Ceccarelli and Tallulah Proulx through the basic quota. Ceccarelli was the first skier to qualify publicly, confirming his qualification in late December 2025. Ceccarelli is born in Quezon City but was adopted by Italian parents and is based in Tuscany. Based in the United States, Proulx had a "last minute" qualification in January 2026.

Ceccarelli has been training at the Stelvio Ski Center since the first week of February 2026. Proulx had a training camp with local teams at the Val di Fassa. Disqualified for going out of his slalom line at the 2025 Asian Winter Games, Ceccarelli managed expectations as he stated he's not allowing pressure to affect him this time around and is looking to build on his experience in the event. He further expressed the goal of being among the top 50 male skiers.

The two skiers competed first in the giant slalom. Ceccarelli was the first to compete, finishing 54th overall in the men's event held on 14 February at the Stelvio Ski Center. In that competition, he was among the 69 skiers out of 81 men who completed both runs. The men's giant slalom was won by Lucas Pinheiro Braathen of Brazil who won the first Winter Olympics medal for a South American country. At 17 years old, Proulx finished 52nd overall in the women's event at the Olimpia delle Tofane.

The men's slalom on 16 February saw heavy snowfall during the first run. This led to Ceccarelli and 51 other skiers (including Pinheiro Braathen) to fail to complete their run. Proulx finished 50th overall in the women's slalom on 18 February, marking the end of the Philippines participation in the 2026 games.

Athlete	Event	Run 1		Run 2		Total	
Athlete	Event	Time	Rank	Time	Rank	Time	Rank
Francis Ceccarelli	Men's giant slalom	1:27.36	57	1:20:87	53	2:48.83	54
Francis Ceccarelli	Men's slalom	DNF					
Tallulah Proulx	Women's giant slalom	1:17.15	58	1:24.47	52	2:41.62	52
Tallulah Proulx	Women's slalom	1:02.93	61	1:05.55	50	2:08.48	50

== Aftermath ==
The Philippines did not win any medals. Ceccarelli and Proulx were satisfied of their performance despite the former failing to complete his run in the men's slalom. The pair reprised their roles as flagbearers together at the closing ceremony held at the Verona Arena on 22 February.

The PSSF has pledged to send more athletes to future Winter Olympic Games. According to PSSF president Jim Apelar, the federation has received ten inquiries from athletes seeking either to represent the Philippines or to switch their sporting nationality. The federation has also emphasized its plans to develop cross-country skiing in the Philippines through roller skiing, an off-snow equivalent suited to tropical conditions.
