= Philippines at the 2022 Winter Olympics =

- Flag of the Philippines
- IOC code: PHI
- NOC: Philippine Olympic Committee
- Website: www.olympic.ph

in Beijing, China 4–20 February 2022
- Competitors: 1 (1 man) in 1 sport
- Flag bearers: Asa Miller (opening and closing)
- Officials: Valeriano "Bones" Floro II, Chef de Mission
- Medals: Gold 0 Silver 0 Bronze 0 Total 0

Winter Olympics appearances (overview)
- 1972; 1976–1984; 1988; 1992; 1994–2010; 2014; 2018; 2022; 2026

The Philippines competed at the 2022 Winter Olympics in Beijing, China, from 4 to 20 February 2022. The country qualified one athlete in alpine skiing.

== Background ==
The Philippines made its third consecutive appearance in the Winter Olympics, having featured in the 2014 and 2018 editions. The country has qualified a lone alpine skier for the 2022 Winter Olympics and is accompanied by five officials including a coach. The government's Philippine Sports Commission provided ₱3.3 million funding for the athlete's Olympic campaign.

The Philippines attempted to qualify two figure skaters for the Olympics and an athlete in short track speed skating.

Asa Miller, the country's lone competitor, was the country's flagbearer during the opening ceremony. This is also the second time Miller served as flagbearer in an Olympic opening and closing ceremonies. He also served as flagbearer in the closing ceremony.

== Competitors ==
The following is the list of number of competitors participating at the Games per sport/discipline.

Sport	Men	Women	Total
Alpine skiing	1	0	1
Total	1	0	1

== Alpine skiing ==
By meeting the basic qualification standards, The Philippines qualified one male alpine skier. The Philippine Ski and Snowboard Federation has nominated Asa Miller to fill the lone berth. This would mark Miller's second appearance in the Winter Olympics having last competed in the 2018 edition. Based in Portland, Oregon, Miller trained in the United States as part of his preparation for the 2022 Winter Olympics. He was joined by his coach Will Gregorak.

While Miller does not consider himself a strong contender to win a gold medal, he is aiming to surpass his 70th place finish in the men's giant slalom event he recorded in the 2018 Olympics. His coach Gregorak, believes he is capable of finishing among the top 45 in his event.

Miller and his father expressed wariness of incurring a did not finish (DNF) prior to competing the men's giant slalom event on 13 February noting it could even happen to top skiers citing the case of two-time Olympian Mikaela Shiffrin who recorded DNFs in the women's giant slalom and slalom days earlier. Miller crashed out 20 seconds into the first run of the giant slalom due to heavy snowfall. He was among the 33 skiers who incurred a DNF in the first run. Miller however did not attribute his poor finish to the weather condition admitting that he had lost focus. For the men's slalom held on 16 February, Miller skied for 36 seconds but also incurred a DNF. Gregorak attributed the snow's condition which he described as "a little uneven between being aggressive and icy in some spots" as a factor in Miller's finish, but Miller himself also admitted that he also had fault.

Athlete	Event	Run 1		Run 2		Total	
Athlete	Event	Time	Rank	Time	Rank	Time	Rank
Asa Miller	Men's giant slalom	DNF		Did not advance		—	
Asa Miller	Men's slalom	DNF		Did not advance		—	

== See also ==
- Tropical nations at the Winter Olympics
