= Philippines at the 1988 Winter Olympics =

- Flag of the Philippines
- IOC code: PHI
- NOC: Philippine Olympic Committee
- Website: www.olympic.ph

in Calgary, Canada 13–28 February 1988
- Competitors: 1 (man) in 1 sport
- Flag bearer: Raymond Ocampo
- Medals: Gold 0 Silver 0 Bronze 0 Total 0

Winter Olympics appearances (overview)
- 1972; 1976–1984; 1988; 1992; 1994–2010; 2014; 2018; 2022; 2026

The Philippines competed at the 1988 Winter Olympics in Calgary, Canada from 13 to 28 February 1988. The nation returned after a 16-year absence since they last competed at the 1972 Winter Olympics in Sapporo, Japan.

A single luger competed for the Philippines. Michael Teruel, an alpine skier also initially qualified but did not compete.

== Luge ==
Raymond Ocampo was the only athlete to compete for the Philippines. He was cleared to compete despite the lack of a Philippine passport at the time. President Corazon Aquino wrote to the International Olympic Committee to allow Ocampo to compete. He crashed during practice on 11 February at the Canada Olympic Park course but did not sustained any injury.

Ocampo competed in the men's singles from 14 to 15 February. He finished 35th or second to the last among lugers who completed all runs, only besting Bart Carpentier Alting of the Netherlands Antilles. He recorded a total time of 3:27.661, 22 seconds behind gold medalist Jens Müller of East Germany and two seconds ahead of Alting.

Men

Athlete	Run 1		Run 2		Run 3		Run 4		Total	
Athlete	Time	Rank	Time	Rank	Time	Rank	Time	Rank	Time	Rank
Raymond Ocampo	54.703	38	51.617	36	51.926	34	49.415	32	3:27.661	35
