= Alpine skiing at the 2018 Winter Olympics – Qualification =

The following is about the qualification rules and the quota allocation for the alpine skiing events at the 2018 Winter Olympics.

== Qualification rules ==
=== Quotas ===
A maximum of 320 athletes are allowed to compete at the Olympic Games. A maximum of 22 athletes per nation will be allowed to compete with a maximum of 14 males or 14 females from a nation being permitted. Each nation may also enter a maximum of one team in the team event.

=== A standard ===
The A standard entails a competitor to be ranked within the top 500 in any event on the FIS Points list which will be made public after qualification ends on January 21, 2018. The qualification period began on July 1, 2017.

=== B standard ===
National Olympic committees (NOC) without athletes meeting the A standard can enter one competitor of each sex (known as the basic quota) in only the slalom and/or giant slalom events. These athletes must have only a maximum of 140 FIS points on the FIS Points list on 21 January 2018.

The Points List is calculated by taking the average of five event results for technical events (giant slalom and slalom) and three events for speed events (downhill, super G, and super combined).

=== Qualification eligibility ===
The Olympic Points List (A Standard)	Downhill	Super G	Super Combined	Slalom	Giant Slalom
Ranked <=500 in DH	<80 points	<80 points	<80 points	140 points	140 points
Ranked <=500 in SG		<80 points		140 points	140 points
Ranked <=500 in SC			<80 points	140 points	140 points
Ranked <=500 in GS, SL				140 points	140 points
B Standard				140 points	140 points

=== Allocation of quotas ===
Basic Quota

Every NOC will be assigned one male and one female quota spot meeting the B standard.

Host nation

The host nation (South Korea) is awarded an additional quota per gender, granted all athletes meet the standard above.

Top 30 on Points list

Every NOC with at least one male and/or female in the top 30 of any event will be allocated one additional male and/or female quota in addition to the basic quota. If an athlete is ranked in the top 30 in more than one event a second additional quota for that sex will be given or if two different athletes are in the top 30.

Remaining quotas

The remaining quotas will be assigned using the Olympic Quota allocation list on 22 January 2018. The spots will be assigned until a maximum of 320 quotas are reached including the above. When a nation reaches its maximum, remaining athletes from that country will be skipped over. The list is a table of athletes in the top 500 in their two best events (including both male and female athletes). These additional quotas can be used to enter either male or female.

An athlete can be counted only once for the above criteria. For example, if a country has only one athlete meeting all three criteria then only one quota will be given (not 3).

Team event

The top 16 nations in the overall FIS World Cup Nations standings as of 22 January 2018 will ber permitted to enter a team of two male and two female athletes in the mixed team event. If South Korea is not among the top 16, then the top 15 along with South Korea will qualify. In the event one of these nations have only 3 quota spots earned above then they will be awarded a fourth quota to allow them to participate in the team event. It is unknown if these quotas are in addition to the 320 above.

== Qualification summary ==
Nations	Men	Women	Additional	Team event	Athletes
Albania	1	1			2
Andorra	1	1	1		3
Argentina	1	1			2
Armenia	1				1
Australia	1	1	1		3
Austria	3	3	16	X	22
Azerbaijan	1				1
Belarus	1	1			2
Belgium	1	1	2		4
Bosnia and Herzegovina	1	1			2
Bolivia	1				1
Brazil	1				1
Bulgaria	1	1	1		3
Canada	3	3	8	X	14
Chile	1	1	1		3
China	1	1			2
Colombia	1				1
Croatia	2	2	6		10
Cyprus	1				1
Czech Republic	2	3	4	X	9
Denmark	1		1		2
Eritrea	1				1
Estonia	1	1			2
Finland	1		1		2
France	3	3	16	X	22
Georgia	1	1			2
Germany	3	3	8	X	14
Great Britain	2	1	1	X	4
Greece	1	1			2
Hong Kong		1			1
Hungary	2	2		X	4
Iceland	1	1			2
Iran	1	1			2
Ireland	1	1			2
Israel	1				1
Italy	3	3	14	X	20
Japan	1	1	2		4
Kazakhstan	1	1			2
Kenya		1			1
Kosovo	1				1
Kyrgyzstan	1				1
Latvia	1	1			2
Lebanon	1	1			2
Liechtenstein	1	1			2
Lithuania	1	1			2
Luxembourg	1				1
Macedonia	1				1
Madagascar		1			1
Malaysia	1				1
Malta		1			1
Mexico	1	1			2
Moldova	1				1
Monaco	1	1			2
Montenegro	1	1			2
Morocco	1				1
New Zealand	1	1	1		3
North Korea^{1}	2	1			3
Norway	3	3	5	X	11
Pakistan	1				1
Philippines	1				1
Poland	1	1	1		3
Portugal	1				1
Puerto Rico	1				1
Romania	1	1			2
Olympic Athletes from Russia	3	2		X	5
San Marino	1				1
Serbia	1	1	1		3
Slovakia	2	3	2	X	7
Slovenia	3	3	5	X	11
South Africa	1				1
South Korea	2	2		X	4
Spain	1		1		2
Sweden	3	3	5	X	11
Switzerland	3	3	16	X	22
Thailand	1	1			2
Timor-Leste	1				1
Turkey	1	1			2
Ukraine	1	1			2
United States	3	3	16	X	22
Uzbekistan	1				1
Total: 80 NOCs	105	82	136	16	323

1. The IOC decided to allow two male and one female competitor from North Korea, which were allocated as three additional places to the existing quotas.

== Allocation ==
The following is the quota allocation as of 28 January 2018.

=== Men ===
Criteria	Athletes per NOC	Total athletes	Qualified
Basic quota + 2 spots in top 30	3	33	Austria; Canada; France; Germany; Italy; Norway; Olympic Athletes from Russia; Slovenia; Sweden; Switzerland; United States
Basic quota + 1 spot in top 30	2	4	Croatia; Great Britain
Basic quota + 1 spot for the team event	2	6	Czech Republic; Hungary; Slovakia
Basic quota + Host nation	2	2	South Korea
Basic quota	1	58	Albania; Andorra; Argentina; Armenia; Australia; Azerbaijan; Belarus; Belgium; Bosnia and Herzegovina; Bolivia; Brazil; Bulgaria; ~~Cayman Islands~~; Chile; China; Colombia; Cyprus; Denmark; Eritrea; Estonia; Finland; Georgia; Greece; Iceland; Iran; Ireland; Israel; Japan; Kazakhstan; Kyrgyzstan; Kosovo; Latvia; Lebanon; Liechtenstein; Lithuania; Luxembourg; Macedonia; Malaysia; Mexico; Moldova; Monaco; Montenegro; Morocco; ~~Netherlands~~; New Zealand; Pakistan; ~~Peru~~; Philippines; Poland; Portugal; Puerto Rico; Romania; San Marino; Serbia; Spain; South Africa; Thailand; Timor-Leste; Turkey; Ukraine; Uzbekistan
IOC special considerations	2	2	North Korea
Total 76 NOC's		105	

=== Women ===
Criteria	Athletes per NOC	Total athletes	Qualified
Basic quota + 2 spots in top 30	3	36	Austria; Canada; Czech Republic; France; Germany; Italy; ~~Liechtenstein~~; Norway; Slovakia; Slovenia; Sweden; Switzerland; United States
Basic quota + 1 spot in top 30	2	4	Croatia; Hungary
Basic quota + 1 spot for the team event	2	2	Olympic Athletes from Russia
Basic quota + Host nation	2	2	South Korea
Basic quota	1	37	Albania; Andorra; Argentina; Australia; Belarus; Belgium; Bosnia and Herzegovina; Bulgaria; Chile; China; ~~Denmark~~; Estonia; ~~Finland~~; Georgia; Great Britain; Greece; Hong Kong; Iceland; Iran; Ireland; Japan; Kazakhstan; Kenya; Latvia; Lebanon; Liechtenstein; Lithuania; Madagascar; Malta; Mexico; Monaco; Montenegro; ~~Netherlands~~; New Zealand; ~~Peru~~; Poland; Romania; Serbia; ~~Spain~~; Thailand; ~~Togo~~; Turkey; Ukraine
IOC special considerations	1	1	North Korea
Total 54 NOC's		82	

=== Additional quotas ===
Athletes per NOC	Total	Qualified
16	64	Austria; France; Switzerland; United States
14	14	Italy^{1}
8	16	Canada^{1} Germany^{1}
6	6	Croatia
5	15	Norway^{1} Slovenia; Sweden^{1}
4	4	Czech Republic
2	6	Belgium; Japan^{1} Slovakia
1	12	Andorra; Australia; Bulgaria; Chile; Denmark; Finland; Great Britain; New Zealand; Poland; Spain; Serbia
Total	136	

1. Canada and Japan rejected one quota; Germany, Italy and Sweden rejected two and Norway rejected ten.
- Added totals from reallocation are included in the totals.

=== Next eligible NOC ===
In total 29 quotas have been made available for reallocation, 1 one of which was given to Hungary to compete in the team event. The following are the next eligible NOC's with those entries removed who either have already returned quotas, or are at the maximum (22) as of 24 January 2018. Bold indicates the acceptance of a quota, while a strike through indicates refusal.

Next available NOC

**United States**
**France**
**United States**
**Serbia**
**France**
**Croatia**
**Croatia**
**Andorra**
~~Slovenia~~
~~Serbia~~
**Croatia**
**France**
**New Zealand**
~~Great Britain~~
**Czech Republic**
**Czech Republic**
~~New Zealand~~
**Slovakia**
**Poland**
**Czech Republic**
~~Olympic Athletes from Russia~~
**Finland**
**Denmark**
~~Finland~~
**Chile**
**Slovakia**
**Bulgaria**
**Australia**
**Czech Republic**
**Belgium**
**Croatia**
**Croatia**
~~Czech Republic~~
~~Poland~~
**Spain**
**Belgium**
Slovakia
Spain
Andorra
Andorra
Chile
Latvia

=== Team event ===
Rank	Current rank	Points
**1**	Austria	7123
2	Switzerland	5341
3	Italy	4436
4	Norway	4154
5	United States	3060
6	France	3002
7	Germany	2502
8	Sweden	1839
9	Slovenia	858
10	~~Liechtenstein~~	601
11	Slovakia	587
12	Canada	542
13	Great Britain	230
14	Olympic Athletes from Russia	178
15	~~Croatia~~	101
16	Czech Republic	97
17	~~Japan~~	35
18	~~Serbia~~	31
19	Hungary	18
20	Finland	15
21	Poland	14
22	Netherlands	12
23	South Korea	4

- Liechtenstein, Croatia, Japan and Serbia declined a spot in the team event.
