= Ian Lariba =

Filipino table tennis player (1944–2018)

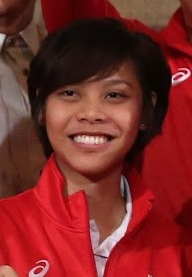
- Lariba in 2016

Personal information
- Nickname: Yanyan
- Nationality: Philippines
- Born: Ian Nietes Lariba; October 13, 1994 Cagayan de Oro, Philippines
- Died: September 2, 2018 (aged 23) Taguig, Metro Manila, Philippines
- Height: 162 cm (5 ft 4 in)
- Weight: 56 kg (123 lb)

Sport
- Sport: Table tennis

Ian "Yan" Nietes Lariba (October 13, 1994 – September 2, 2018) was a Filipino table tennis player. She represented the Philippines in international tournaments and competed in the women's singles event at the 2016 Summer Olympics.

== Early life and education ==
Lariba was born in Cagayan de Oro on October 13, 1994. She took up table tennis at age 9 with her parents encouraging her to take up "something new" for the summer. Prior to taking up the sport, Lariba played badminton at a sports complex in Cagayan de Oro but found herself to be too small for the sport at that time. At the age of 10, coach Noel Gonzales of the Philippine national table tennis team discovered Lariba while playing in the Palarong Pambansa. Just a year after taking up table tennis, she started to participate in provincial and national competitions. She also played for the varsity team of the Corpus Christi School.

Lariba attended De La Salle University for her college studies, majoring in management in financial institutions.

== Career ==
=== Collegiate ===
Lariba was also a varsity player for her university, De La Salle University playing at the UAAP Table tennis tournament. She entered the table tennis team after being scouted in a national competition. On her first season she was named as UAAP Season 74 Rookie of the Year and in the UAAP Season 75 her team won the championship and Lariba herself was named Most Valuable Player (MVP). Her collegiate team fell short of winning the championship at UAAP Season 76, winning games only to suffer a sweeping loss to UP Lady Maroons in the final.

She led her team to win the championship at UAAP Season 77 and was awarded a second MVP recognition along with being named UAAP Athlete of the Year along with Hannah Dato of Ateneo de Manila University and Janelle Mae Frayna of Far Eastern University. She again led her team to win the championship at UAAP Season 78 and was also named MVP once again. She was also awarded as one of four student-athletes who won the Athlete of the Year award in Season 78, together with Alyssa Valdez and Jessie Lacuna of Ateneo de Manila University and Queeny Sabobo of Adamson University.

=== International ===
Lariba represented the Philippines in international table tennis competitions. She led the Philippine team to a first-place finish in Division 4 of the 2014 World Table Tennis Team Championships in Tokyo, Japan with Jamaica Sy. She also competed at the 2013 and 2015 Southeast Asian Games and qualified for the 2016 Summer Olympics through the Asian qualification tournament held in Hong Kong in April 2016. She was the first Filipina table tennis player to qualify in the Summer Olympics since its introduction in 1988 as a demonstration sport. In preparation for the Olympic qualifiers, Lariba underwent training in South Korea and was trained by Korean coach Kwon Mi Sook. She also competed in the 2016 Asean University Games, her last tournament before the Olympics.

At the 2016 Summer Olympics, Lariba carried the Philippine flag as the delegation's flagbearer for the opening ceremony. She was defeated by Han Xing of the Congo in the preliminary round. In fact, after the Rio match game, she got a tattoo with the Olympic logo on her wrist. She said that it is a once-in-a-lifetime experience for her, so she wanted to get a tattoo as her participation and remembrance of the international event. She asked her friend to do it for her.

==== 2016 ITTF-Asian Olympic Qualification Tournament ====
Round	Result	Opponent	Score	Individual Sets						
Round of 16	Loss	(Thailand) Orawan Paranang	0–4	6–11	2–11	4–11	11–13	—	—	—
Round of 8	Win	(Qatar) Maha Faramarzi	4–0	11–5	11–1	11–7	11–4	—	—	—
Round of 4	Win	(Iran) Mahjobeh Omrani	4–2	11–6	15–13	11–8	7–11	10–12	11–8	—
Round of 2	Loss	(Thailand) Nanthana Komwong	3–4	7–11	4–11	11–7	8–11	11–7	11–9	6–11
11th Olympic Slot	Win	(Indonesia) Lilis Indriani	4–0	11–6	11–2	11–8	11–5	—	—	—

==== 2016 Olympics - Women's Singles ====
Round	Result	Opponent	Score	Individual Sets						
Round of 32	Loss	(Republic of the Congo) Han Xing	0–4	7–11	11–13	9–11	7–11	—	—	—

=== Awards ===
Singles

- ASEAN University Games: 3rd (2014)
- South East Asian Junior Table Tennis Championships: 2nd (2005), 3rd (2006)
- Philippine National Games: 1st (2013, 2014, 2016)
- Palarong Pambansa: 1st (2005, 2006, 2007)

Team

- UAAP Table Tennis Team: 1st (2012, 2014, 2015), 2nd (2011, 2013)

Honors

- UAAP Athlete of the Year (2014, 2015)
- UAAP table tennis MVP (2012, 2014, 2015)
- UAAP table tennis Rookie of the Year (2011)
- DLSU table tennis jersey retired
- 2019 DLSAA Sports Hall of Fame Awardee

== Illness and death ==
In May 2017, Lariba was diagnosed with acute myeloid leukemia and underwent treatment that month. Her illness reportedly damaged the morale of the Philippine table tennis team. Lariba underwent a stemcell transplant in early October 2017 at the St. Luke's Medical Center at Bonifacio Global City and was discharged from the hospital on October 23, 2017.

Lariba's treatment was supported by the table tennis community, including the International Table Tennis Federation, which committed $20,000, and the South Korean table tennis team, which donated $3,000 that was personally handed over to Lariba at the hospital through Korean table tennis player Ryu Seung-min.

In January 2018, Lariba was admitted to St. Luke's Medical Center anew after her vision started to blur and the left side of her body began to weaken. Cancer cells were assessed to have spread to her brain and spinal cord. She underwent chemotherapy, multiple laboratory examinations, and blood transfusion. She later underwent head surgery on January 23. On August 17, 2018, after her condition relapsed, Lariba was admitted again to St. Luke's Medical Center. She underwent a 5-day chemotherapy protocol and her brain and spine were observed through MRI on August 23. She died at the Taguig hospital on September 2, 2018.

Olympic Games
Preceded by Michael Christian Martinez	Flagbearer for Philippines; Rio 2016	Succeeded by Asa Miller
