= Philippines at the 1992 Winter Olympics =

- Flag of the Philippines
- IOC code: PHI
- NOC: Philippine Olympic Committee
- Website: www.olympic.ph

in Albertville
- Competitors: 1 (man) in 1 sport
- Flag bearer: Michael Teruel
- Medals: Gold 0 Silver 0 Bronze 0 Total 0

Winter Olympics appearances (overview)
- 1972; 1976–1984; 1988; 1992; 1994–2010; 2014; 2018; 2022; 2026

The Philippines sent a delegation to compete at the 1992 Winter Olympics in Albertville, France from 8–23 February 1992. This was the nation's third appearance at the Winter Olympic Games. The delegation consisted of a single athlete, alpine skier Michael Teruel. He competed in both the giant slalom, where he finished in 71st, and in the slalom, in which he finished in 49th.

== Background ==
The Philippine Olympic Committee was recognized by the International Olympic Committee on 1 January 1929. The Philippines first entered Olympic competition at the 1924 Summer Olympics, and made their first appearance at a Winter Olympic Games at the 1972 Winter Olympics. The nation's participation at Winter Olympics since has been sporadic, and Albertville was only their third appearance. The 1992 Winter Olympics were held from 8–23 February 1992, a total of 1,801 athletes representing 64 National Olympic Committees took part. The only athlete sent by the Philippines to these Olympics was alpine skier Michael Teruel. He was chosen as the flag-bearer for the opening ceremony.

== Competitors ==
The following is the list of number of competitors in the Games.

Sport	Men	Women	Total
Alpine skiing	1	0	1
Total	1	0	1

== Alpine skiing ==
Michael Teruel was 22 years old at the time of the Albertville Olympics, and was making his only Olympic appearance. He was attending Dartmouth College in the United States, and was in the class of 1992. Teruel was entered into two events, the first, the giant slalom, was held on 18 February over two legs. He finished the first leg in 1 minute and 24.13 seconds, which put him in 88th place out of 112 competitors who finished that leg. His second leg time was 1 minute and 22.71 seconds, which was good for 68th place. His total event time was 2 minutes and 46.84 seconds, which put him in 71st place overall out of 91 classified finishers. The gold medal was won by Italian Alberto Tomba in a time of 2 minutes and 6.98 seconds. The silver medal was won by Marc Girardelli of Luxembourg, and the bronze was earned by the Norwegian Kjetil André Aamodt.

The men's slalom was held on 22 February over two legs. Teruel finished the first leg in a time of 1 minute and 13.95 seconds, which put him in 66th place out of 81 competitors who finished the first leg. His second leg time of 1 minute and 13.54 seconds was enough to be in 51st place for that leg. His total event time was 2 minutes and 27.49 seconds, which put him in 49th place overall out of 65 athletes who finished both legs. The gold medal was won by Norwegian Finn Christian Jagge in 1 minute and 44.39 seconds, the silver medal by Tomba, and the bronze medal was earned by Michael Tritscher of Austria.

Athlete	Event	Race 1	Race 2	Total	
Athlete	Event	Time	Time	Time	Rank
Michael Teruel	Men's giant slalom	1:24.13	1:22.71	2:46.84	71
Michael Teruel	Men's slalom	1:13.95	1:13.54	2:27.49	49

== See also ==
- Philippines at the 1992 Summer Olympics
