= Philippines at the 2014 Winter Olympics =

- Flag of the Philippines
- IOC code: PHI
- NOC: Philippine Olympic Committee
- Website: www.olympic.ph

in Sochi
- Competitors: 1 in 1 sport
- Flag bearer: Michael Christian Martinez (opening)
- Officials: Dr. Julian Camacho, Chef de Mission
- Medals: Gold 0 Silver 0 Bronze 0 Total 0

Winter Olympics appearances (overview)
- 1972; 1976–1984; 1988; 1992; 1994–2010; 2014; 2018; 2022; 2026

The Philippines competed at the 2014 Winter Olympics in Sochi, Russia from 7 to 23 February 2014. The country's participation in the games marks the first time a figure skater from Southeast Asia competed in the Games. The 2014 Games marked the first time a Filipino Olympic team competed in Russia, as the Philippines and 64 western countries took part at the American-led boycott in the 1980 Summer Olympics held in Moscow due to the Soviet–Afghan War.

== Background ==
The Philippine delegation to the 2014 Winter Olympics consisted of one athlete in figure skating. The country competed at the Winter Olympics for the first time since 1992 Winter Olympics and 4th time overall. At least three Filipino-Ameticans athletes made failed attempts to qualify for the 2010 Winter Olympics in Vancouver, Canada namely the figure skating pair composed of Michael Dimalanta and Gracielle Jeanne Tan and snowboarder Eden Serina.

The sole competitor for the country was Michael Christian Martinez, who is also the first South East Asian figure skater to qualify for the games. Martinez served as the flag bearer for the Philippines in the opening ceremony, while a volunteer served as flag bearer in the closing ceremony.

Audrey Alcaraz, another Filipino figure skater made a non-competitive performance in the closing ceremony during the handover of hosting duties of the Winter Olympics to Pyeongchang, South Korea, the host city of the 2018 Winter Olympics.

== Figure skating ==
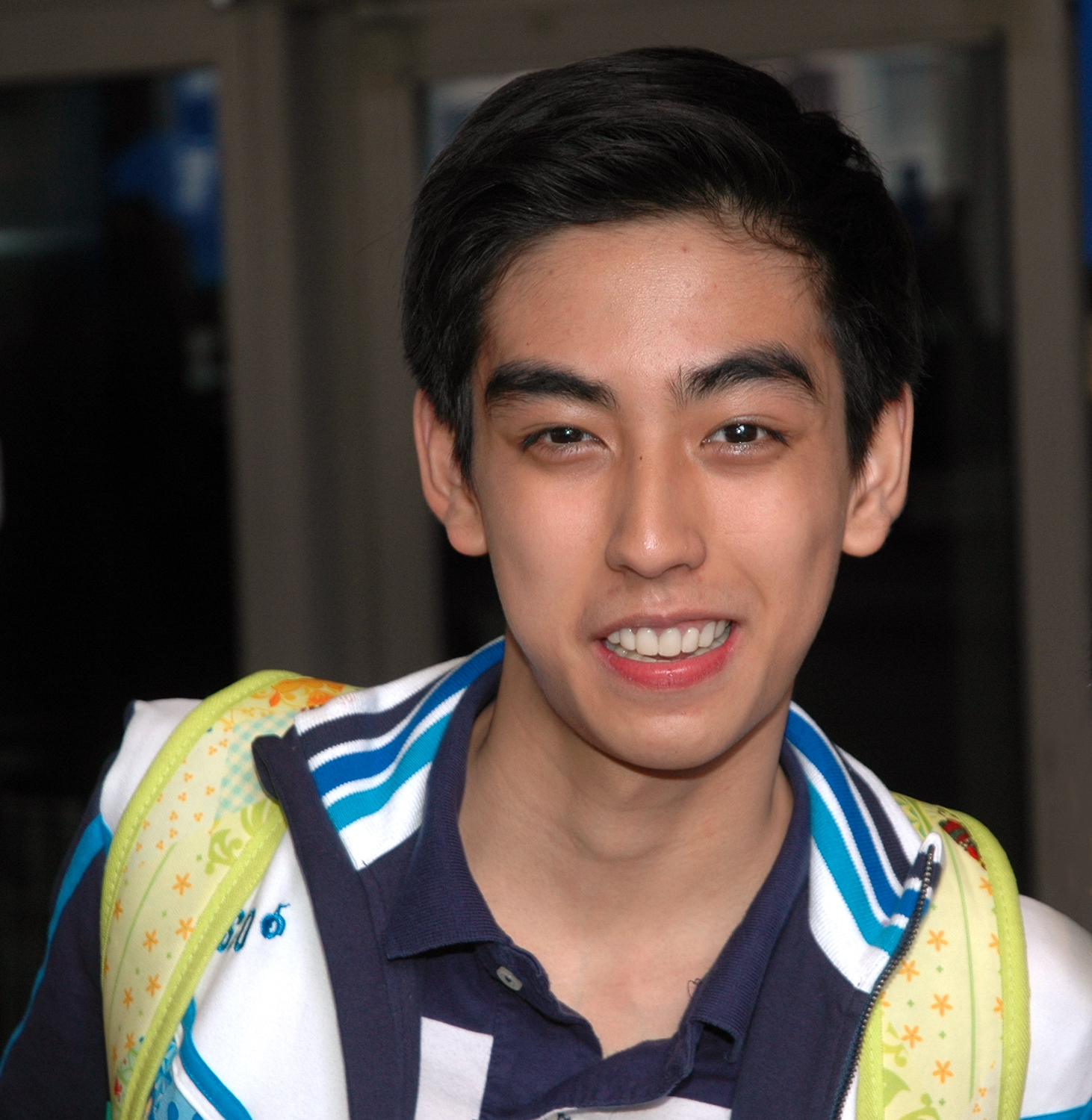
Michael Christian Martinez competed in figure skating as the only athlete from the Philippines.

The Philippines has achieved the following quota place:

| Athlete | Event | SP | | FS | | Total | |
| Athlete | Event | Points | Rank | Points | Rank | Points | Rank |
|---|---|---|---|---|---|---|---|
| Michael Christian Martinez | Men's singles | 64.81 | 19 Q | 119.44 | 20 | 184.25 | 19 |

Michael Christian Martinez secured qualification by finishing 7th in the 2013 Nebelhorn Trophy in Germany.

In the short program, Martinez was the fifth athlete to perform in the men's singles competition which featured 29 other figure skaters from 21 NOCs. He performed to the tune of the "Love Theme from Romeo and Juliet". He managed to make a triple Axel, inverted camel and triple loops without landing issues and finished his performance with a Biellmann spin. He is among the 24 figure skaters who advanced to the free skate after he finished 19th with 64.81 points.

In the free skate, Martinez skated to the tune of "Malagueña" by Cuban composer Ernesto Lecuona. The third athlete to perform in the final routine, Martinez garnered 199.44 points. Among the elements he performed were triple Axels, triple double toes, and double flip. However he landed on his right hand following an execution of a triple loop. Like in the short program, he ended his free skate with a Biellmann spin.

Martinez finished the competition in 19th place (out of 30 skaters), meaning with a single athlete competing in a single event, The Philippines did not win a medal at these Games.

== See also ==
- Philippines at the 2014 Summer Youth Olympics
