= 2025 Olympic Qualification Event – Curling =

Olympic qualifying event

2025 Olympic Qualification Event
- Host city: Kelowna, British Columbia, Canada
- Arena: Kelowna Curling Club
- Dates: December 5–18
- Men's qualifiers: United States; China
- Women's qualifiers: Japan; United States
- Mixed doubles qualifiers: Czech Republic; South Korea

The Olympic Qualification Event is an international curling tournament that was held from December 5–18, 2025 at the Kelowna Curling Club in Kelowna, British Columbia, Canada. This Olympic Qualification Event featured three competitions: Women’s, Men’s and Mixed Doubles to determine the final two places for National Olympic Committees (NOCs) in each event at the 2026 Olympic Winter Games.

In the Women’s and Men’s competition, the NOCs which ranked 9–13 from the ranking list created from the results at the 2024 and 2025 world championships, along with the top three NOCs from the Pre-Qualification Event will compete. In the Mixed Doubles competition, any NOC mixed doubles team that qualified for the 2024 and 2025 world championship, but did not yet qualify for the Olympic Winter Games, as well as the next highest ranked NOCs from the official Mixed Doubles World Ranking list (as of 1 May 2025) were invited until all 16 places are filled at the OQE.

== Men ==
=== Qualification ===
Means of qualification	Vacancies	Qualified
2024 & 2025 World Men's Curling Championship	5	United States; China; Japan; Netherlands; South Korea
2025 Pre-Olympic Qualification Event	3	Philippines; Poland; New Zealand
TOTAL	8	

=== Teams ===
The teams are listed as follows:

China	Japan	Netherlands	New Zealand
Skip: Xu Xiaoming; Third: Fei Xueqing; Second: Li Zhichao; Lead: Xu Jingtao; Alternate: Wang Zhenhao	Fourth: Riku Yanagisawa; Skip: Tsuyoshi Yamaguchi; Second: Takeru Yamamoto; Lead: Satoshi Koizumi; Alternate: Shingo Usui	Skip: Wouter Gösgens; Third: Laurens Hoekman; Second: Jaap van Dorp; Lead: Tobias van den Hurk; Alternate: Alexander Magan	Skip: Anton Hood; Third: Hunter Walker; Second: Ben Smith; Lead: Brett Sargon; Alternate: Jared Palanuik
Philippines	Poland	South Korea	United States
Skip: Marc Pfister; Third: Christian Haller; Second: Enrico Pfister; Lead: Brayden Carpenter; Alternate: Alan Frei	Skip: Konrad Stych; Third: Krzysztof Domin; Second: Marcin Ciemiński; Lead: Bartosz Łobaza; Alternate: Maksym Grzelka	Skip: Kim Soo-hyuk; Third: Kim Chang-min; Second: Yoo Min-hyeon; Lead: Kim Hak-kyun; Alternate: Jeon Jae-ik	Skip: Daniel Casper; Third: Luc Violette; Second: Ben Richardson; Lead: Aidan Oldenburg; Alternate: Rich Ruohonen

=== Round robin standings ===
Final Round Robin Standings

Key
Teams to Playoffs

Country	Skip	W	L	W–L	DSC
China	Xu Xiaoming	6	1	1–0	34.608
United States	Daniel Casper	6	1	0–1	21.792
Japan	Tsuyoshi Yamaguchi	5	2	–	19.742
South Korea	Kim Soo-hyuk	3	4	2–0	28.825
Netherlands	Wouter Gösgens	3	4	1–1	20.258
Philippines	Marc Pfister	3	4	0–2	24.017
New Zealand	Anton Hood	2	5	–	50.158
Poland	Konrad Stych	0	7	–	38.175

Round Robin Summary Table
Pos.	Country	China	Japan	Netherlands	New Zealand	Philippines	Poland	South Korea	United States	Record
1	China	—	6–9	8–6	7–2	5–2	7–0	9–3	9–8	6–1
3	Japan	9–6	—	7–5	7–3	7–9	10–7	8–5	2–5	5–2
5	Netherlands	6–8	5–7	—	7–4	10–4	9–2	7–9	3–7	3–4
7	New Zealand	2–7	3–7	4–7	—	2–6	10–8	7–6	5–6	2–5
6	Philippines	2–5	9–7	4–10	6–2	—	9–3	5–10	3–9	3–4
8	Poland	0–7	7–10	2–9	8–10	3–9	—	5–7	4–7	0–7
4	South Korea	3–9	5–8	9–7	6–7	10–5	7–5	—	5–7	3–4
2	United States	8–9	5–2	7–3	6–5	9–3	7–4	7–5	—	6–1

=== Round robin results ===
All draw times are listed in Pacific Time (UTC−07:00).

==== Draw 1 ====
Saturday, December 6, 9:00

Sheet A	1	2	3	4	5	6	7	8	9	10	Final
Japan (Yamaguchi) 🔨	0	1	0	0	0	0	0	1	0	X	2
United States (Casper)	0	0	1	0	0	0	2	0	2	X	5

Sheet B	1	2	3	4	5	6	7	8	9	10	Final
China (Xu)	1	0	3	0	2	0	0	1	0	1	8
Netherlands (Gösgens) 🔨	0	1	0	1	0	1	2	0	1	0	6

Sheet C	1	2	3	4	5	6	7	8	9	10	Final
South Korea (Kim)	1	0	0	2	0	2	0	1	0	1	7
Poland (Stych) 🔨	0	1	0	0	1	0	2	0	1	0	5

Sheet D	1	2	3	4	5	6	7	8	9	10	Final
Philippines (Pfister) 🔨	0	0	0	1	0	0	2	0	3	X	6
New Zealand (Hood)	0	0	0	0	1	0	0	1	0	X	2

==== Draw 2 ====
Saturday, December 6, 19:00

Sheet A	1	2	3	4	5	6	7	8	9	10	Final
Poland (Stych) 🔨	1	0	1	0	0	0	1	0	X	X	3
Philippines (Pfister)	0	2	0	3	0	1	0	3	X	X	9

Sheet B	1	2	3	4	5	6	7	8	9	10	Final
South Korea (Kim) 🔨	0	2	0	0	2	0	1	0	1	0	6
New Zealand (Hood)	0	0	1	0	0	3	0	2	0	1	7

Sheet C	1	2	3	4	5	6	7	8	9	10	Final
Netherlands (Gösgens)	0	0	0	2	0	0	2	0	1	0	5
Japan (Yamaguchi) 🔨	0	1	0	0	2	1	0	2	0	1	7

Sheet D	1	2	3	4	5	6	7	8	9	10	Final
China (Xu)	0	3	0	2	0	1	0	1	0	2	9
United States (Casper) 🔨	3	0	1	0	2	0	1	0	1	0	8

==== Draw 3 ====
Sunday, December 7, 14:00

Sheet A	1	2	3	4	5	6	7	8	9	10	Final
New Zealand (Hood)	0	1	0	2	0	0	0	0	1	0	4
Netherlands (Gösgens) 🔨	1	0	2	0	0	2	0	1	0	1	7

Sheet B	1	2	3	4	5	6	7	8	9	10	Final
Philippines (Pfister)	0	0	1	0	1	0	0	0	0	X	2
China (Xu) 🔨	0	2	0	1	0	0	1	1	0	X	5

Sheet C	1	2	3	4	5	6	7	8	9	10	Final
United States (Casper)	0	1	0	1	0	2	0	0	3	0	7
South Korea (Kim) 🔨	1	0	1	0	1	0	0	1	0	1	5

Sheet D	1	2	3	4	5	6	7	8	9	10	Final
Japan (Yamaguchi) 🔨	2	0	1	0	3	1	0	0	1	2	10
Poland (Stych)	0	2	0	3	0	0	1	1	0	0	7

==== Draw 4 ====
Monday, December 8, 9:00

Sheet A	1	2	3	4	5	6	7	8	9	10	Final
South Korea (Kim) 🔨	2	0	0	1	0	0	1	0	1	X	5
Japan (Yamaguchi)	0	0	1	0	4	1	0	2	0	X	8

Sheet B	1	2	3	4	5	6	7	8	9	10	Final
Poland (Stych)	0	1	0	0	0	1	0	0	2	0	4
United States (Casper) 🔨	0	0	0	2	1	0	0	3	0	1	7

Sheet C	1	2	3	4	5	6	7	8	9	10	Final
China (Xu) 🔨	2	2	1	0	2	0	X	X	X	X	7
New Zealand (Hood)	0	0	0	1	0	1	X	X	X	X	2

Sheet D	1	2	3	4	5	6	7	8	9	10	Final
Netherlands (Gösgens) 🔨	0	2	0	2	2	0	4	X	X	X	10
Philippines (Pfister)	0	0	2	0	0	2	0	X	X	X	4

==== Draw 5 ====
Monday, December 8, 19:00

Sheet A	1	2	3	4	5	6	7	8	9	10	Final
United States (Casper) 🔨	1	2	0	0	1	0	0	1	0	1	6
New Zealand (Hood)	0	0	0	1	0	2	0	0	2	0	5

Sheet B	1	2	3	4	5	6	7	8	9	10	Final
Japan (Yamaguchi) 🔨	0	0	0	3	0	0	2	2	0	0	7
Philippines (Pfister)	0	1	3	0	0	2	0	0	2	1	9

Sheet C	1	2	3	4	5	6	7	8	9	10	Final
Poland (Stych)	0	1	0	1	0	0	0	0	X	X	2
Netherlands (Gösgens) 🔨	1	0	3	0	0	0	3	2	X	X	9

Sheet D	1	2	3	4	5	6	7	8	9	10	Final
South Korea (Kim) 🔨	0	0	0	0	1	0	2	0	X	X	3
China (Xu)	0	0	2	1	0	2	0	4	X	X	9

==== Draw 6 ====
Tuesday, December 9, 14:00

Sheet A	1	2	3	4	5	6	7	8	9	10	Final
China (Xu) 🔨	0	2	1	1	0	0	3	X	X	X	7
Poland (Stych)	0	0	0	0	0	0	0	X	X	X	0

Sheet B	1	2	3	4	5	6	7	8	9	10	11	Final
Netherlands (Gösgens) 🔨	2	0	0	2	0	1	0	1	1	0	0	7
South Korea (Kim)	0	3	0	0	1	0	2	0	0	1	2	9

Sheet C	1	2	3	4	5	6	7	8	9	10	Final
Philippines (Pfister) 🔨	0	0	1	0	2	0	X	X	X	X	3
United States (Casper)	1	3	0	3	0	2	X	X	X	X	9

Sheet D	1	2	3	4	5	6	7	8	9	10	Final
New Zealand (Hood)	0	0	1	0	1	0	1	0	0	X	3
Japan (Yamaguchi) 🔨	0	1	0	2	0	2	0	1	1	X	7

==== Draw 7 ====
Wednesday, December 10, 9:00

Sheet A	1	2	3	4	5	6	7	8	9	10	Final
Philippines (Pfister)	0	2	0	0	1	1	0	1	X	X	5
South Korea (Kim) 🔨	3	0	0	2	0	0	5	0	X	X	10

Sheet B	1	2	3	4	5	6	7	8	9	10	Final
New Zealand (Hood) 🔨	4	0	2	0	0	1	0	2	0	1	10
Poland (Stych)	0	2	0	2	0	0	1	0	3	0	8

Sheet C	1	2	3	4	5	6	7	8	9	10	Final
Japan (Yamaguchi) 🔨	0	2	0	4	0	1	0	2	0	X	9
China (Xu)	0	0	2	0	2	0	2	0	0	X	6

Sheet D	1	2	3	4	5	6	7	8	9	10	Final
United States (Casper) 🔨	0	0	3	0	1	0	3	0	X	X	7
Netherlands (Gösgens)	0	0	0	1	0	1	0	1	X	X	3

=== Playoffs ===
Qualification Game 1
1	China	4
2	United States	9

Qualification Game 2
1	China	9
3	Japan	4

Qualified
United States
China

==== Qualification Game 1 ====
Wednesday, December 10, 19:00

Sheet C	1	2	3	4	5	6	7	8	9	10	Final
China (Xu) 🔨	2	0	0	0	0	1	0	1	0	X	4
United States (Casper)	0	1	1	1	1	0	1	0	4	X	9

Player percentages
China		United States	
Xu Jingtao	94%	Aidan Oldenburg	94%
Li Zhichao	85%	Ben Richardson	93%
Fei Xueqing	71%	Luc Violette	81%
Xu Xiaoming	63%	Daniel Casper	83%
Total	78%	Total	88%

==== Qualification Game 2 ====
Thursday, December 11, 15:00

Sheet D	1	2	3	4	5	6	7	8	9	10	Final
China (Xu) 🔨	2	0	0	0	2	0	1	0	4	X	9
Japan (Yamaguchi)	0	0	1	0	0	2	0	1	0	X	4

Player percentages
China		Japan	
Xu Jingtao	99%	Satoshi Koizumi	97%
Li Zhichao	82%	Takeru Yamamoto	90%
Fei Xueqing	100%	Tsuyoshi Yamaguchi	81%
Xu Xiaoming	85%	Riku Yanagisawa	74%
Total	91%	Total	85%

=== Player percentages ===
Round robin only

Leads	%
(China) Xu Jingtao	89.5
(Japan) Satoshi Koizumi	88.6
(Philippines) Brayden Carpenter	87.5
(South Korea) Kim Hak-kyun	87.1
(Netherlands) Tobias van den Hurk	86.7

Seconds	%
(China) Li Zhichao	87.5
(United States) Ben Richardson	87.3
(Netherlands) Jaap van Dorp	85.5
(Philippines) Enrico Pfister	84.4
(South Korea) Yoo Min-hyeon	83.4

Thirds	%
(China) Fei Xueqing	89.8
(United States) Luc Violette	89.5
(Japan) Tsuyoshi Yamaguchi (Skip)	85.7
(Netherlands) Laurens Hoekman	81.3
(South Korea) Kim Chang-min	81.1

Skips	%
(China) Xu Xiaoming	89.8
(United States) Daniel Casper	86.9
(South Korea) Kim Soo-hyuk	84.0
(Japan) Riku Yanagisawa (Fourth)	83.0
(Netherlands) Wouter Gösgens	80.7
(Philippines) Marc Pfister	80.7

== Women ==
=== Qualification ===
Means of qualification	Vacancies	Qualified
2024 & 2025 World Women's Curling Championship	5	Norway; United States; Japan; Turkey; Estonia
2025 Pre-Olympic Qualification Event	3	Czech Republic; Germany; Australia
TOTAL	8	

=== Teams ===
The teams are listed as follows:

Australia	Czech Republic	Estonia	Germany
Skip: Helen Williams; Third: Sara Westman; Second: Kristen Tsourlenes; Lead: Karen Titheridge; Alternate: Michelle Fredericks-Armstrong	Skip: Hana Synáčková; Third: Linda Nemčoková; Second: Zuzana Pražáková; Lead: Karolína Frederiksen; Alternate: Lenka Vokounová	Fourth: Liisa Turmann; Skip: Kerli Laidsalu; Second: Erika Tuvike; Lead: Heili Grossmann; Alternate: Karoline Kaare	Fourth: Kim Sutor; Third: Emira Abbes; Second: Zoé Antes; Skip: Sara Messenzehl; Alternate: Joy Sutor
Japan	Norway	Turkey	United States
Skip: Sayaka Yoshimura; Third: Kaho Onodera; Second: Yuna Kotani; Lead: Anna Ohmiya; Alternate: Mina Kobayashi	Fourth: Kristin Skaslien; Skip: Marianne Rørvik; Second: Mille Haslev Nordbye; Lead: Eilin Kjærland; Alternate: Ingeborg Forbregd	Skip: Dilşat Yıldız; Third: Öznur Polat; Second: İclal Karaman; Lead: Berfin Şengül; Alternate: İfayet Şafak Çalıkuşu	Skip: Tabitha Peterson; Third: Cory Thiesse; Second: Tara Peterson; Lead: Taylor Anderson-Heide; Alternate: Aileen Geving

=== Round robin standings ===
Final Round Robin Standings

Key
Teams to Playoffs

Country	Skip	W	L	W–L	DSC
Norway	Marianne Rørvik	6	1	1–0	31.833
Japan	Sayaka Yoshimura	6	1	0–1	17.700
United States	Tabitha Peterson	5	2	–	43.250
Germany	Sara Messenzehl	4	3	–	32.125
Turkey	Dilşat Yıldız	3	4	–	46.308
Estonia	Kerli Laidsalu	2	5	–	39.175
Australia	Helen Williams	1	6	1–0	29.350
Czech Republic	Hana Synáčková	1	6	0–1	46.308

Round Robin Summary Table
Pos.	Country	Australia	Czech Republic	Estonia	Germany	Japan	Norway	Turkey	United States	Record
7	Australia	—	8–5	4–12	4–8	5–7	5–12	7–8	4–10	1–6
8	Czech Republic	5–8	—	4–7	4–9	3–10	5–6	5–8	9–7	1–6
6	Estonia	12–4	7–4	—	3–10	2–9	8–9	7–8	6–8	2–5
4	Germany	8–4	9–4	10–3	—	6–8	3–6	8–4	5–9	4–3
2	Japan	7–5	10–3	9–2	8–6	—	9–10	10–5	8–4	6–1
1	Norway	12–5	6–5	9–8	6–3	10–9	—	6–4	7–8	6–1
5	Turkey	8–7	8–5	8–7	4–8	5–10	4–6	—	4–10	3–4
3	United States	10–4	7–9	8–6	9–5	4–8	8–7	10–4	—	5–2

=== Round robin results ===
All draw times are listed in Pacific Time (UTC−08:00).

==== Draw 1 ====
Friday, December 5, 19:00

Sheet A	1	2	3	4	5	6	7	8	9	10	Final
Norway (Rørvik)	0	1	0	0	1	0	0	2	0	2	6
Germany (Messenzehl) 🔨	1	0	0	0	0	1	0	0	1	0	3

Sheet B	1	2	3	4	5	6	7	8	9	10	Final
Japan (Yoshimura) 🔨	2	0	0	2	0	1	0	0	2	1	8
United States (Peterson)	0	2	0	0	1	0	0	1	0	0	4

Sheet C	1	2	3	4	5	6	7	8	9	10	Final
Turkey (Yıldız)	0	0	3	0	2	0	2	0	0	1	8
Estonia (Laidsalu) 🔨	0	1	0	2	0	2	0	1	1	0	7

Sheet D	1	2	3	4	5	6	7	8	9	10	Final
Australia (Williams) 🔨	1	1	0	0	0	2	0	1	1	2	8
Czech Republic (Synáčková)	0	0	1	1	1	0	2	0	0	0	5

==== Draw 2 ====
Saturday, December 6, 14:00

Sheet A	1	2	3	4	5	6	7	8	9	10	Final
Estonia (Laidsalu)	0	0	4	4	0	0	1	3	X	X	12
Australia (Williams) 🔨	0	1	0	0	2	1	0	0	X	X	4

Sheet B	1	2	3	4	5	6	7	8	9	10	Final
Turkey (Yıldız)	0	2	2	0	1	0	0	2	0	1	8
Czech Republic (Synáčková) 🔨	0	0	0	1	0	3	0	0	1	0	5

Sheet C	1	2	3	4	5	6	7	8	9	10	Final
United States (Peterson)	0	0	0	3	2	0	1	1	0	1	8
Norway (Rørvik) 🔨	0	2	1	0	0	2	0	0	2	0	7

Sheet D	1	2	3	4	5	6	7	8	9	10	Final
Japan (Yoshimura)	0	0	2	1	1	0	0	2	0	2	8
Germany (Messenzehl) 🔨	0	2	0	0	0	2	0	0	2	0	6

==== Draw 3 ====
Sunday, December 7, 9:00

Sheet A	1	2	3	4	5	6	7	8	9	10	Final
Czech Republic (Synáčková) 🔨	0	1	0	3	0	3	0	1	1	0	9
United States (Peterson)	0	0	1	0	3	0	2	0	0	1	7

Sheet B	1	2	3	4	5	6	7	8	9	10	Final
Australia (Williams) 🔨	0	2	0	0	1	1	0	0	1	0	5
Japan (Yoshimura)	3	0	1	0	0	0	0	1	0	2	7

Sheet C	1	2	3	4	5	6	7	8	9	10	Final
Germany (Messenzehl) 🔨	1	0	1	1	0	1	1	0	3	X	8
Turkey (Yıldız)	0	1	0	0	1	0	0	2	0	X	4

Sheet D	1	2	3	4	5	6	7	8	9	10	11	Final
Norway (Rørvik)	0	0	2	3	0	2	0	0	1	0	1	9
Estonia (Laidsalu) 🔨	1	0	0	0	1	0	3	1	0	2	0	8

==== Draw 4 ====
Sunday, December 7, 19:00

Sheet A	1	2	3	4	5	6	7	8	9	10	11	Final
Turkey (Yıldız)	0	0	0	1	0	0	1	0	0	2	0	4
Norway (Rørvik) 🔨	0	1	0	0	0	2	0	0	1	0	2	6

Sheet B	1	2	3	4	5	6	7	8	9	10	Final
Estonia (Laidsalu)	0	0	0	0	2	0	1	0	X	X	3
Germany (Messenzehl) 🔨	0	3	1	2	0	2	0	2	X	X	10

Sheet C	1	2	3	4	5	6	7	8	9	10	Final
Japan (Yoshimura) 🔨	2	0	0	3	0	2	0	3	X	X	10
Czech Republic (Synáčková)	0	0	1	0	1	0	1	0	X	X	3

Sheet D	1	2	3	4	5	6	7	8	9	10	Final
United States (Peterson) 🔨	2	0	0	3	1	0	1	0	3	X	10
Australia (Williams)	0	1	0	0	0	1	0	2	0	X	4

==== Draw 5 ====
Monday, December 8, 14:00

Sheet A	1	2	3	4	5	6	7	8	9	10	Final
Germany (Messenzehl) 🔨	2	3	0	0	1	0	0	1	2	X	9
Czech Republic (Synáčková)	0	0	1	0	0	1	2	0	0	X	4

Sheet B	1	2	3	4	5	6	7	8	9	10	Final
Norway (Rørvik)	0	2	4	0	0	2	1	0	3	X	12
Australia (Williams) 🔨	1	0	0	2	1	0	0	1	0	X	5

Sheet C	1	2	3	4	5	6	7	8	9	10	Final
Estonia (Laidsalu)	0	1	0	0	1	1	0	2	1	0	6
United States (Peterson) 🔨	2	0	1	1	0	0	1	0	0	3	8

Sheet D	1	2	3	4	5	6	7	8	9	10	Final
Turkey (Yıldız)	0	3	0	0	0	0	2	0	X	X	5
Japan (Yoshimura) 🔨	2	0	3	0	1	2	0	2	X	X	10

==== Draw 6 ====
Tuesday, December 9, 9:00

Sheet A	1	2	3	4	5	6	7	8	9	10	Final
Japan (Yoshimura) 🔨	2	0	0	3	1	0	3	X	X	X	9
Estonia (Laidsalu)	0	1	0	0	0	1	0	X	X	X	2

Sheet B	1	2	3	4	5	6	7	8	9	10	Final
United States (Peterson)	0	1	0	0	4	0	0	5	X	X	10
Turkey (Yıldız) 🔨	0	0	1	0	0	2	1	0	X	X	4

Sheet C	1	2	3	4	5	6	7	8	9	10	Final
Australia (Williams) 🔨	1	0	0	0	1	0	1	0	1	X	4
Germany (Messenzehl)	0	2	2	1	0	2	0	1	0	X	8

Sheet D	1	2	3	4	5	6	7	8	9	10	Final
Czech Republic (Synáčková)	0	0	0	1	0	2	0	0	1	1	5
Norway (Rørvik) 🔨	0	0	2	0	0	0	3	1	0	0	6

==== Draw 7 ====
Tuesday, December 9, 19:00

Sheet A	1	2	3	4	5	6	7	8	9	10	Final
Australia (Williams) 🔨	0	3	0	0	2	0	0	0	2	0	7
Turkey (Yıldız)	1	0	2	1	0	1	0	2	0	1	8

Sheet B	1	2	3	4	5	6	7	8	9	10	Final
Czech Republic (Synáčková)	0	0	2	0	0	1	0	0	1	X	4
Estonia (Laidsalu) 🔨	1	2	0	1	1	0	1	1	0	X	7

Sheet C	1	2	3	4	5	6	7	8	9	10	11	Final
Norway (Rørvik)	0	2	0	1	0	4	0	1	1	0	1	10
Japan (Yoshimura) 🔨	2	0	3	0	1	0	1	0	0	2	0	9

Sheet D	1	2	3	4	5	6	7	8	9	10	Final
Germany (Messenzehl)	0	0	0	0	2	0	1	0	2	0	5
United States (Peterson) 🔨	0	2	1	1	0	1	0	1	0	3	9

=== Playoffs ===
Qualification Game 1
1	Norway	5
2	Japan	6

Qualification Game 2
1	Norway	4
3	United States	8

Qualified
Japan
United States

==== Qualification Game 1 ====
Wednesday, December 10, 14:00

Sheet C	1	2	3	4	5	6	7	8	9	10	Final
Norway (Rørvik) 🔨	1	0	2	0	0	1	0	0	1	0	5
Japan (Yoshimura)	0	2	0	1	1	0	0	1	0	1	6

Player percentages
Norway		Japan	
Eilin Kjærland	88%	Anna Ohmiya	75%
Mille Haslev Nordbye	75%	Yuna Kotani	90%
Marianne Rørvik	76%	Kaho Onodera	99%
Kristin Skaslien	70%	Sayaka Yoshimura	88%
Total	77%	Total	88%

==== Qualification Game 2 ====
Thursday, December 11, 10:00

Sheet D	1	2	3	4	5	6	7	8	9	10	Final
Norway (Rørvik) 🔨	0	3	0	0	0	0	0	1	0	X	4
United States (Peterson)	0	0	3	0	1	1	1	0	2	X	8

Player percentages
Norway		United States	
Eilin Kjærland	89%	Taylor Anderson-Heide	89%
Mille Haslev Nordbye	83%	Tara Peterson	89%
Marianne Rørvik	78%	Cory Thiesse	90%
Kristin Skaslien	67%	Tabitha Peterson	93%
Total	79%	Total	91%

=== Player percentages ===
Round robin only

Leads	%
(Japan) Anna Ohmiya	89.6
(United States) Taylor Anderson-Heide	87.3
(Norway) Eilin Kjærland	84.8
(Turkey) Berfin Şengül	84.4
(Estonia) Heili Grossmann	84.0

Seconds	%
(Norway) Mille Haslev Nordbye	85.1
(Japan) Yuna Kotani	82.8
(United States) Tara Peterson	80.9
(Germany) Zoé Antes	77.9
(Estonia) Erika Tuvike	76.6

Thirds	%
(Japan) Kaho Onodera	86.7
(United States) Cory Thiesse	85.5
(Germany) Emira Abbes	82.6
(Turkey) Öznur Polat	81.4
(Norway) Marianne Rørvik (Skip)	79.3

Skips	%
(Japan) Sayaka Yoshimura	86.5
(Norway) Kristin Skaslien (Fourth)	80.4
(United States) Tabitha Peterson	78.8
(Germany) Kim Sutor (Fourth)	77.9
(Turkey) Dilşat Yıldız	76.4

== Mixed doubles ==
=== Qualification ===
Means of qualification	Vacancies	Qualified
2024 and 2025 World Mixed Doubles Curling Championship	13	Australia; South Korea; Japan; Germany; New Zealand; Denmark; China; Finland; Czech Republic; Netherlands; Turkey; France; Spain
World Ranking as of 1 May 2025	3	Hungary; Austria; Latvia
TOTAL	16	

=== World Ranking ===
Member Associations	Rank	Points
Australia	9	33.413
Japan	10	29.492
Germany	11	18.921
South Korea	12	18.159
Czech Republic	13	14.000
Denmark	14	14.000
New Zealand	15	12.684
Finland	16	11.971
China	17	10.819
Turkey	18	9.743
Hungary	19	8.860
Spain	20	8.730
Netherlands	21	8.032
Latvia	22	4.943
Austria	24	3.892
France	31	3.010

=== Teams ===
The teams are listed as follows:

Australia	Austria	China	Czech Republic
Female: Tahli Gill; Male: Dean Hewitt	Female: Verena Pflügler; Male: Mathias Genner	Female: Ye Zixuan; Male: Yu Sen	Female: Julie Zelingrová; Male: Vít Chabičovský
Denmark	Finland	France	Germany
Female: Jasmin Holtermann; Male: Henrik Holtermann	Female: Lotta Immonen; Male: Markus Sipilä	Female: Stéphanie Barbarin; Male: Wilfrid Coulot	Female: Pia-Lisa Schöll; Male: Joshua Sutor
Hungary	Japan	Latvia	Netherlands
Female: Linda Joó; Male: Raul Kárász	Female: Tori Koana; Male: Go Aoki	Female: Katrīna Gaidule; Male: Roberts Reinis Buncis	Female: Lisenka Bomas; Male: Wouter Gösgens
New Zealand	South Korea	Spain	Turkey
Female: Courtney Smith; Male: Anton Hood	Female: Kim Seon-yeong; Male: Jeong Yeong-seok	Female: Oihane Otaegi; Male: Mikel Unanue	Female: Berfin Şengül; Male: Bilal Ömer Çakır

=== Round robin standings ===
Final Round Robin Standings

Key
Teams to Playoffs

Group A	Athletes	W	L	W–L	DSC
Czech Republic	Julie Zelingrová / Vít Chabičovský	6	1	1–0	36.375
South Korea	Kim Seon-yeong / Jeong Yeong-seok	6	1	0–1	33.442
Japan	Tori Koana / Go Aoki	5	2	–	14.558
Turkey	Berfin Şengül / Bilal Ömer Çakır	4	3	–	34.733
Germany	Pia-Lisa Schöll / Joshua Sutor	3	4	1–0	44.208
Latvia	Katrīna Gaidule / Roberts Reinis Buncis	3	4	0–1	35.833
Finland	Lotta Immonen / Markus Sipilä	1	6	–	21.050
Austria	Verena Pflügler / Mathias Genner	0	7	–	174.750

Group B	Athletes	W	L	W–L	DSC
Australia	Tahli Gill / Dean Hewitt	6	1	1–0	13.192
China	Ye Zixuan / Yu Sen	6	1	0–1	23.625
Netherlands	Lisenka Bomas / Wouter Gösgens	5	2	–	21.325
Denmark	Jasmin Holtermann / Henrik Holtermann	4	3	–	26.025
New Zealand	Courtney Smith / Anton Hood	3	4	–	49.242
Hungary	Linda Joó / Raul Kárász	2	5	1–0	31.292
France	Stéphanie Barbarin / Wilfrid Coulot	2	5	0–1	28.242
Spain	Oihane Otaegi / Mikel Unanue	0	7	–	37.950

Group A Round Robin Summary Table
Pos.	Country	Austria	Czech Republic	Finland	Germany	Japan	Latvia	Korea	Turkey	Record
8	Austria	—	2–15	L–W	L–W	L–W	L–W	L–W	L–W	0–7
1	Czech Republic	15–2	—	7–6	8–4	3–8	8–4	9–3	8–5	6–1
7	Finland	W–L	6–7	—	5–7	3–7	6–13	5–6	6–7	1–6
5	Germany	W–L	4–8	7–5	—	3–7	6–4	2–8	4–6	3–4
3	Japan	W–L	8–3	7–3	7–3	—	6–7	4–7	11–2	5–2
6	Latvia	W–L	4–8	13–6	4–6	7–6	—	5–7	6–7	3–4
2	South Korea	W–L	3–9	6–5	8–2	7–4	7–5	—	8–2	6–1
4	Turkey	W–L	5–8	7–6	6–4	2–11	7–6	2–8	—	4–3

Group B Round Robin Summary Table
Pos.	Country	Australia	China	Denmark	France	Hungary	Netherlands	New Zealand	Spain	Record
1	Australia	—	6–5	8–7	5–4	9–6	6–7	8–4	9–4	6–1
2	China	5–6	—	7–4	12–3	9–3	7–5	6–5	8–7	6–1
4	Denmark	7–8	4–7	—	7–5	7–4	4–6	11–4	9–1	4–3
7	France	4–5	3–12	5–7	—	6–7	5–6	11–7	9–6	2–5
6	Hungary	6–9	3–9	4–7	7–6	—	2–8	6–7	7–6	2–5
3	Netherlands	7–6	5–7	6–4	6–5	8–2	—	5–8	8–2	5–2
5	New Zealand	4–8	5–6	4–11	7–11	7–6	8–5	—	6–5	3–4
8	Spain	4–9	7–8	1–9	6–9	6–7	2–8	5–6	—	0–7

=== Round robin results ===
All draw times are listed in Pacific Time (UTC−07:00).

==== Draw 1 ====
Saturday, December 13, 15:30

Sheet A	1	2	3	4	5	6	7	8	Final
Germany (Schöll / Sutor)	0	2	1	1	0	1	0	1	6
Latvia (Gaidule / Buncis) 🔨	1	0	0	0	1	0	2	0	4

Sheet B	1	2	3	4	5	6	7	8	9	Final
Finland (Immonen / Sipilä) 🔨	2	0	1	0	2	0	0	1	0	6
Turkey (Şengül / Çakır)	0	1	0	2	0	2	1	0	1	7

Sheet C	1	2	3	4	5	6	7	8	Final
Japan (Koana / Aoki)	1	1	0	0	1	0	1	0	4
South Korea (Kim / Jeong) 🔨	0	0	2	1	0	3	0	1	7

Sheet D	1	2	3	4	5	6	7	8	Final
Austria (Pflügler / Genner) 🔨	0	0	1	0	1	0	X	X	2
Czech Republic (Zelingrová / Chabičovský)	2	2	0	6	0	5	X	X	15

==== Draw 2 ====
Saturday, December 13, 19:30

Sheet A	1	2	3	4	5	6	7	8	Final
Spain (Otaegi / Unanue) 🔨	1	0	1	1	1	0	0	1	5
New Zealand (Smith / Hood)	0	2	0	0	0	1	3	0	6

Sheet B	1	2	3	4	5	6	7	8	Final
Denmark (Holtermann / Holtermann)	0	0	1	0	2	0	1	0	4
Netherlands (Bomas / Gösgens) 🔨	2	1	0	1	0	1	0	1	6

Sheet C	1	2	3	4	5	6	7	8	Final
France (Barbarin / Coulot) 🔨	1	1	0	0	0	1	1	0	4
Australia (Gill / Hewitt)	0	0	2	1	1	0	0	1	5

Sheet D	1	2	3	4	5	6	7	8	Final
Hungary (Joó / Kárász)	0	1	0	0	2	0	X	X	3
China (Ye / Yu) 🔨	3	0	1	1	0	4	X	X	9

==== Draw 3 ====
Sunday, December 14, 10:00

Sheet A	Final
South Korea (Kim / Jeong) 🔨	W
Austria (Pflügler / Genner)	L

Sheet B	1	2	3	4	5	6	7	8	Final
Japan (Koana / Aoki) 🔨	3	1	0	3	1	0	X	X	8
Czech Republic (Zelingrová / Chabičovský)	0	0	1	0	0	2	X	X	3

Sheet C	1	2	3	4	5	6	7	8	Final
Turkey (Şengül / Çakır) 🔨	1	0	2	1	0	1	0	1	6
Germany (Schöll / Sutor)	0	2	0	0	1	0	1	0	4

Sheet D	1	2	3	4	5	6	7	8	Final
Finland (Immonen / Sipilä)	0	4	0	1	0	1	0	X	6
Latvia (Gaidule / Buncis) 🔨	5	0	1	0	4	0	3	X	13

==== Draw 4 ====
Sunday, December 14, 14:00

Sheet A	1	2	3	4	5	6	7	8	Final
Australia (Gill / Hewitt) 🔨	3	0	2	0	2	0	0	2	9
Hungary (Joó / Kárász)	0	2	0	2	0	1	1	0	6

Sheet B	1	2	3	4	5	6	7	8	Final
France (Barbarin / Coulot) 🔨	1	0	1	0	0	2	0	X	4
China (Ye / Yu)	0	3	0	4	2	0	3	X	12

Sheet C	1	2	3	4	5	6	7	8	Final
Netherlands (Bomas / Gösgens) 🔨	3	1	1	1	1	0	1	X	8
Spain (Otaegi / Unanue)	0	0	0	0	0	2	0	X	2

Sheet D	1	2	3	4	5	6	7	8	Final
Denmark (Holtermann / Holtermann)	2	2	0	1	2	0	4	X	11
New Zealand (Smith / Hood) 🔨	0	0	3	0	0	1	0	X	4

==== Draw 5 ====
Sunday, December 14, 18:00

Sheet A	1	2	3	4	5	6	7	8	Final
Czech Republic (Zelingrová / Chabičovský)	0	3	2	0	1	1	1	0	8
Turkey (Şengül / Çakır) 🔨	1	0	0	3	0	0	0	1	5

Sheet B	Final
Austria (Pflügler / Genner)	L
Finland (Immonen / Sipilä) 🔨	W

Sheet C	1	2	3	4	5	6	7	8	Final
Latvia (Gaidule / Buncis)	0	0	1	0	3	0	0	3	7
Japan (Koana / Aoki) 🔨	1	2	0	1	0	1	1	0	6

Sheet D	1	2	3	4	5	6	7	8	Final
Germany (Schöll / Sutor) 🔨	1	0	1	0	0	0	X	X	2
South Korea (Kim / Jeong)	0	2	0	3	2	1	X	X	8

==== Draw 6 ====
Monday, December 15, 10:00

Sheet A	1	2	3	4	5	6	7	8	Final
China (Ye / Yu) 🔨	1	0	1	0	1	0	3	1	7
Netherlands (Bomas / Gösgens)	0	1	0	1	0	3	0	0	5

Sheet B	1	2	3	4	5	6	7	8	Final
Hungary (Joó / Kárász)	0	1	0	0	0	1	2	0	4
Denmark (Holtermann / Holtermann) 🔨	1	0	1	2	2	0	0	1	7

Sheet C	1	2	3	4	5	6	7	8	Final
New Zealand (Smith / Hood)	0	2	0	2	1	0	2	X	7
France (Barbarin / Coulot) 🔨	3	0	4	0	0	4	0	X	11

Sheet D	1	2	3	4	5	6	7	8	Final
Spain (Otaegi / Unanue)	0	2	0	1	0	1	0	X	4
Australia (Gill / Hewitt) 🔨	1	0	4	0	3	0	1	X	9

==== Draw 7 ====
Monday, December 15, 14:00

Sheet A	1	2	3	4	5	6	7	8	Final
Japan (Koana / Aoki) 🔨	2	0	3	0	2	0	X	X	7
Germany (Schöll / Sutor)	0	1	0	1	0	1	X	X	3

Sheet B	1	2	3	4	5	6	7	8	Final
South Korea (Kim / Jeong) 🔨	1	0	1	0	2	0	3	0	7
Latvia (Gaidule / Buncis)	0	1	0	1	0	2	0	1	5

Sheet C	1	2	3	4	5	6	7	8	Final
Finland (Immonen / Sipilä)	0	1	0	2	1	0	1	1	6
Czech Republic (Zelingrová / Chabičovský) 🔨	1	0	1	0	0	5	0	0	7

Sheet D	Final
Turkey (Şengül / Çakır) 🔨	W
Austria (Pflügler / Genner)	L

==== Draw 8 ====
Monday, December 15, 18:00

Sheet A	1	2	3	4	5	6	7	8	Final
France (Barbarin / Coulot)	0	3	2	1	0	1	0	2	9
Spain (Otaegi / Unanue) 🔨	4	0	0	0	1	0	1	0	6

Sheet B	1	2	3	4	5	6	7	8	Final
Australia (Gill / Hewitt) 🔨	3	1	0	1	0	2	0	1	8
New Zealand (Smith / Hood)	0	0	2	0	1	0	1	0	4

Sheet C	1	2	3	4	5	6	7	8	Final
Denmark (Holtermann / Holtermann) 🔨	1	0	1	0	0	2	0	X	4
China (Ye / Yu)	0	3	0	1	1	0	2	X	7

Sheet D	1	2	3	4	5	6	7	8	Final
Netherlands (Bomas / Gösgens)	1	1	1	1	0	4	X	X	8
Hungary (Joó / Kárász) 🔨	0	0	0	0	2	0	X	X	2

==== Draw 9 ====
Tuesday, December 16, 10:00

Sheet A	1	2	3	4	5	6	7	8	Final
Latvia (Gaidule / Buncis)	0	0	2	0	1	1	0	X	4
Czech Republic (Zelingrová / Chabičovský) 🔨	3	1	0	2	0	0	2	X	8

Sheet B	Final
Germany (Schöll / Sutor) 🔨	W
Austria (Pflügler / Genner)	L

Sheet C	1	2	3	4	5	6	7	8	Final
South Korea (Kim / Jeong) 🔨	2	1	1	0	2	2	X	X	8
Turkey (Şengül / Çakır)	0	0	0	2	0	0	X	X	2

Sheet D	1	2	3	4	5	6	7	8	Final
Japan (Koana / Aoki)	0	2	0	3	0	1	1	X	7
Finland (Immonen / Sipilä) 🔨	1	0	1	0	1	0	0	X	3

==== Draw 10 ====
Tuesday, December 16, 14:00

Sheet A	1	2	3	4	5	6	7	8	Final
New Zealand (Smith / Hood)	0	0	2	1	1	0	1	0	5
China (Ye / Yu) 🔨	2	1	0	0	0	2	0	1	6

Sheet B	1	2	3	4	5	6	7	8	Final
Spain (Otaegi / Unanue)	0	1	0	2	1	1	1	0	6
Hungary (Joó / Kárász) 🔨	3	0	2	0	0	0	0	2	7

Sheet C	1	2	3	4	5	6	7	8	Final
Australia (Gill / Hewitt) 🔨	0	2	0	3	0	0	1	0	6
Netherlands (Bomas / Gösgens)	1	0	1	0	1	1	0	3	7

Sheet D	1	2	3	4	5	6	7	8	Final
France (Barbarin / Coulot) 🔨	0	1	0	0	2	0	2	0	5
Denmark (Holtermann / Holtermann)	1	0	1	2	0	1	0	2	7

==== Draw 11 ====
Tuesday, December 16, 18:00

Sheet A	1	2	3	4	5	6	7	8	Final
Finland (Immonen / Sipilä) 🔨	0	0	2	0	1	0	2	0	5
South Korea (Kim / Jeong)	1	1	0	1	0	1	0	2	6

Sheet B	1	2	3	4	5	6	7	8	Final
Turkey (Şengül / Çakır)	0	0	0	0	2	0	X	X	2
Japan (Koana / Aoki) 🔨	3	3	3	1	0	1	X	X	11

Sheet C	Final
Austria (Pflügler / Genner)	L
Latvia (Gaidule / Buncis) 🔨	W

Sheet D	1	2	3	4	5	6	7	8	Final
Czech Republic (Zelingrová / Chabičovský)	0	0	3	1	1	0	1	2	8
Germany (Schöll / Sutor) 🔨	2	1	0	0	0	1	0	0	4

==== Draw 12 ====
Wednesday, December 17, 10:00

Sheet A	1	2	3	4	5	6	7	8	Final
Denmark (Holtermann / Holtermann) 🔨	3	0	1	0	1	0	2	0	7
Australia (Gill / Hewitt)	0	2	0	2	0	3	0	1	8

Sheet B	1	2	3	4	5	6	7	8	Final
Netherlands (Bomas / Gösgens)	2	0	1	1	0	1	0	1	6
France (Barbarin / Coulot) 🔨	0	3	0	0	1	0	1	0	5

Sheet C	1	2	3	4	5	6	7	8	9	Final
Hungary (Joó / Kárász) 🔨	0	0	1	0	2	2	1	0	0	6
New Zealand (Smith / Hood)	1	1	0	3	0	0	0	1	1	7

Sheet D	1	2	3	4	5	6	7	8	Final
China (Ye / Yu) 🔨	2	1	0	2	1	0	0	2	8
Spain (Otaegi / Unanue)	0	0	1	0	0	4	2	0	7

==== Draw 13 ====
Wednesday, December 17, 14:00

Sheet A	Final
Austria (Pflügler / Genner)	L
Japan (Koana / Aoki) 🔨	W

Sheet B	1	2	3	4	5	6	7	8	Final
Czech Republic (Zelingrová / Chabičovský) 🔨	2	0	3	0	1	0	3	X	9
South Korea (Kim / Jeong)	0	1	0	1	0	1	0	X	3

Sheet C	1	2	3	4	5	6	7	8	Final
Germany (Schöll / Sutor) 🔨	1	1	2	0	1	0	1	1	7
Finland (Immonen / Sipilä)	0	0	0	4	0	1	0	0	5

Sheet D	1	2	3	4	5	6	7	8	Final
Latvia (Gaidule / Buncis) 🔨	1	0	0	0	3	0	2	0	6
Turkey (Şengül / Çakır)	0	2	1	1	0	1	0	2	7

==== Draw 14 ====
Wednesday, December 17, 18:00

Sheet A	1	2	3	4	5	6	7	8	Final
Hungary (Joó / Kárász) 🔨	0	0	1	3	0	1	1	1	7
France (Barbarin / Coulot)	2	1	0	0	3	0	0	0	6

Sheet B	1	2	3	4	5	6	7	8	Final
China (Ye / Yu) 🔨	1	0	1	0	1	0	2	0	5
Australia (Gill / Hewitt)	0	2	0	1	0	1	0	2	6

Sheet C	1	2	3	4	5	6	7	8	Final
Spain (Otaegi / Unanue)	0	0	0	1	0	0	X	X	1
Denmark (Holtermann / Holtermann) 🔨	3	2	1	0	2	1	X	X	9

Sheet D	1	2	3	4	5	6	7	8	Final
New Zealand (Smith / Hood)	0	2	0	2	0	1	1	2	8
Netherlands (Bomas / Gösgens) 🔨	3	0	1	0	1	0	0	0	5

=== Playoffs ===
Qualification Round 1
A1	Czech Republic	6
B1	Australia	5
A2	South Korea	7
B2	China	3

Qualification Round 2
B1	Australia	5
A2	South Korea	10

Qualified
Czech Republic
South Korea

==== Qualification Round 1 ====
Thursday, December 18, 10:00

Sheet B	1	2	3	4	5	6	7	8	Final
South Korea (Kim / Jeong) 🔨	2	0	2	1	0	1	1	X	7
China (Ye / Yu)	0	2	0	0	1	0	0	X	3

Player percentages
South Korea		China	
Kim Seon-yeong	82%	Ye Zixuan	65%
Jeong Yeong-seok	82%	Yu Sen	72%
Total	82%	Total	69%

Sheet C	1	2	3	4	5	6	7	8	Final
Czech Republic (Zelingrová / Chabičovský)	0	1	0	3	1	0	0	1	6
Australia (Gill / Hewitt) 🔨	1	0	1	0	0	2	1	0	5

Player percentages
Czech Republic		Australia	
Julie Zelingrová	89%	Tahli Gill	83%
Vít Chabičovský	75%	Dean Hewitt	81%
Total	81%	Total	82%

==== Qualification Round 2 ====
Thursday, December 18, 17:00

Sheet D	1	2	3	4	5	6	7	8	Final
Australia (Gill / Hewitt) 🔨	1	0	0	2	0	2	0	0	5
South Korea (Kim / Jeong)	0	1	2	0	3	0	1	3	10

Player percentages
Australia		South Korea	
Tahli Gill	75%	Kim Seon-yeong	77%
Dean Hewitt	79%	Jeong Yeong-seok	77%
Total	78%	Total	77%

=== Player percentages ===
Final Round Robin Percentages

Female	%
(Japan) Tori Koana	85.2
(Latvia) Katrīna Gaidule	81.6
(Australia) Tahli Gill	81.2
(Denmark) Jasmin Holtermann	80.3
(Czech Republic) Julie Zelingrová	76.3

Male	%
(Australia) Dean Hewitt	86.6
(Denmark) Henrik Holtermann	84.8
(China) Yu Sen	84.6
(Czech Republic) Vít Chabičovský	83.5
(France) Wilfrid Coulot	81.6
