= Philippines at the Olympics =

- Flag of the Philippines
- IOC code: PHI
- NOC: Philippine Olympic Committee
- Website: www.olympic.ph
- Medals Ranked 84th: Gold 3 Silver 5 Bronze 10 Total 18

Summer appearances
- 1924; 1928; 1932; 1936; 1948; 1952; 1956; 1960; 1964; 1968; 1972; 1976; 1980; 1984; 1988; 1992; 1996; 2000; 2004; 2008; 2012; 2016; 2020; 2024; 2028

Winter appearances
- 1972; 1976–1984; 1988; 1992; 1994–2010; 2014; 2018; 2022; 2026

The Philippines has competed in every edition of the Summer Olympic Games since its debut in the 1924 edition, except when they participated in the American-led boycott of the 1980 Summer Olympics. Filipino athletes have also competed at the Winter Olympic Games on seven occasions since 1972.

The country has also participated in the Summer Youth Olympic Games as well as in the Winter Youth Olympic Games.

Significantly, the Philippines was the first Southeast-Asian country to have medaled at the games; a bronze courtesy of Teófilo Yldefonso during the 1928 Amsterdam games. In 2021, the Philippines won its first-ever gold medal when Hidilyn Diaz won in Tokyo. Another milestone came in 2024 when Carlos Yulo won 2 gold medals in Paris becoming the first Filipino and Southeast-Asian to win multiple gold medals at a single Olympic edition.

== History ==
Participation of Filipino athletes in the Olympics is sanctioned by its National Olympic Committee (NOC). Its NOC since 1975 is the Philippine Olympic Committee (POC). Prior to that date, the Philippines was represented by the POC's predecessor, the Philippine Amateur Athletic Federation which was founded in 1911. The Philippines is a recognized member of the International Olympic Committee since 1929.

Filipino athletes have won a total of eighteen Olympic medals (as of 2024 Summer Olympics), with boxing as the top medal-producing sport. On July 26, 2021, the Philippines clinched its first gold medal at the 2020 Summer Olympics in Tokyo, with Hidilyn Diaz winning the Women's 55 kg event in Weightlifting. Furthermore, with a 1-2-1 haul in its best Olympic showing (until 2024), the Philippines emerged as the best performing Southeast Asian nation, a title they last held coincidentally in 1964, in Tokyo and leaped to third in the all-time medal table for Southeast Asia behind Thailand and Indonesia.

The 2024 Summer Olympics that was held in Paris, was the Philippines' centennial anniversary of its participation in the Games, and its best showing yet, usurping its performance in the previous edition. Carlos Yulo won the gold medal in both the Men's Floor and Vault events in Gymnastics, Aira Villegas and Nesthy Petecio won the bronze medal in Women's Flyweight and Featherweight events, respectively.

=== Summer Olympic Games ===
The Philippines first competed in the Olympic Games in 1924 in Paris, making it the first country from Southeast Asia to compete and, later in 1928, win a medal. The nation has competed at every Summer Olympic Games since then, except when they participated in the American-led boycott of the 1980 Summer Olympics. The Philippines also decided against participating at the 1940 Summer Olympics before the Games was ultimately cancelled due to the outbreak of World War II.

=== Winter Olympic Games ===
The Philippines is the first tropical nation to compete at the Winter Olympic Games when it sent two alpine skiers at the 1972 winter games in Sapporo. It then went on to participate on some of the subsequent winter games, participating in the sports of alpine skiing and luge. In 2014, the Philippines sent the first Filipino and Southeast Asian figure skater to the Sochi winter games, the first time a tropical country has participated in the men's figure skating event.

== Medal tables ==
=== Medals by Summer Games ===
Games	Athletes	Gold	Silver	Bronze	Total	Rank
1924 Paris	1	0	0	0	0	–
1928 Amsterdam	4	0	0	1	1	32
1932 Los Angeles	8	0	0	3	3	25
1936 Berlin	31	0	0	1	1	30
1948 London	24	0	0	0	0	–
1952 Helsinki	25	0	0	0	0	–
1956 Melbourne	39	0	0	0	0	–
1960 Rome	40	0	0	0	0	–
1964 Tokyo	47	0	1	0	1	30
1968 Mexico City	49	0	0	0	0	–
1972 Munich	53	0	0	0	0	–
1976 Montreal	14	0	0	0	0	–
1980 Moscow	boycotted					
1984 Los Angeles	19	0	0	0	0	–
1988 Seoul	31	0	0	1	1	46
1992 Barcelona	26	0	0	1	1	53
1996 Atlanta	12	0	1	0	1	61
2000 Sydney	20	0	0	0	0	–
2004 Athens	16	0	0	0	0	–
2008 Beijing	15	0	0	0	0	–
2012 London	11	0	0	0	0	–
2016 Rio de Janeiro	13	0	1	0	1	69
2020 Tokyo	19	1	2	1	4	50
2024 Paris	22	2	0	2	4	37
2028 Los Angeles	future event					
2032 Brisbane	future event					
Total		3	5	10	18	84

=== Medals by Winter Games ===
Games	Athletes	Gold	Silver	Bronze	Total	Rank
1972 Sapporo	2	0	0	0	0	–
1976 Innsbruck	did not participate					
1980 Lake Placid	did not participate					
1984 Sarajevo	did not participate					
1988 Calgary	1	0	0	0	0	–
1992 Albertville	1	0	0	0	0	–
1994–2010	did not participate					
2014 Sochi	1	0	0	0	0	–
2018 Pyeongchang	2	0	0	0	0	–
2022 Beijing	1	0	0	0	0	–
2026 Milano Cortina	2	0	0	0	0	–
2030 French Alps	future event					
2034 Utah	future event					
Total		0	0	0	0	–

=== Medals by summer sport ===
Sport	Gold	Silver	Bronze	Total
Gymnastics	2	0	0	2
Weightlifting	1	1	0	2
Boxing	0	4	6	10
Athletics	0	0	2	2
Swimming	0	0	2	2
Total	3	5	10	18

== List of medalists ==
Fourteen athletes have won 18 medals for the Philippines at the Summer Olympics (excluding those athletes that have won medals in demonstration sports, which were not counted in the official medal tally) while no medal has ever been won for the country at the Winter Olympics.

== Summary of medals by sport ==
=== Athletics ===
Games	Athletes	Events	Gold	Silver	Bronze	Total
1932 Los Angeles	1	1/29	0	0	1	1
1936 Berlin	6	6/29	0	0	1	1
Total			0	0	2	2

=== Boxing ===
Games	Athletes	Events	Gold	Silver	Bronze	Total
1932 Los Angeles	4	4/8	0	0	1	1
1964 Tokyo	1	1/10	0	1	0	1
1988 Seoul	6	6/12	0	0	1	1
1992 Barcelona	6	6/12	0	0	1	1
1996 Atlanta	5	5/12	0	1	0	1
2020 Tokyo	4	4/13	0	2	1	3
2024 Paris	5	5/13	0	0	2	2
Total			0	4	6	10

=== Gymnastics ===
Games	Athletes	Events	Gold	Silver	Bronze	Total
2024 Paris	4	4/18	2	0	0	2
Total			2	0	0	2

=== Swimming ===
Games	Athletes	Events	Gold	Silver	Bronze	Total
1928 Amsterdam	2	3/11	0	0	1	1
1932 Los Angeles	3	2/11	0	0	1	1
Total			0	0	2	2

=== Weightlifting ===
Games	Athletes	Events	Gold	Silver	Bronze	Total
2016 Rio de Janeiro	2	2/15	0	1	0	1
2020 Tokyo	2	2/14	1	0	0	1
Total			1	1	0	2

== Art competitions ==
The Philippines participated in the art competition of the Olympics in 1948, the last edition of the games in which they were held. Filipino sculptor Graciano Nepomuceno and painter Hernando Ocampo represented the Philippines that year.

== See also ==
- Olympic competitors for the Philippines
- List of flag bearers for the Philippines at the Olympics
- Philippines at the Youth Olympics
- Philippines at the Paralympics
- Tropical nations at the Winter Olympics
- Philippines at the World University Games
- Philippines at the Asian Games
- Philippines at the Southeast Asian Games
