= Francis Ceccarelli =

Filipino-Italian alpine skier (born 2003)

Personal information
- National team: Italy (2019–2023); Philippines (2023–)
- Born: November 15, 2003 (age 23) Quezon City, Metro Manila, Philippines

Skiing career
- Sport: Alpine skiing
- Disciplines: Giant slalom, slalom

Olympics
- Teams: 1 – (2026)

Francis Ceccarelli (born November 15, 2003) is an alpine skier competing for the Philippines who has competed in the 2026 Winter Olympics.

== Early life ==
Francis Ceccarelli was born on November 15, 2003, in Quezon City. He was adopted by an Italian couple and moved to Italy at age 8. He was encouraged to take up alpine skiing by Lisa Seghi, his adoptive mother who was a former professional skier. He also grew up in Abetone where skiing is popular.

== Career ==
Ceccarelli started skiing under Italy in December 2019. He switched his sporting nationality to represent his birth country, the Philippines in May 2023. This process took three years as Ceccarelli had to reacquire his Philippine citizenship and the associated passport.

Ceccarelli took part at the 2025 Asian Winter Games in Harbin. He competed in the men's slalom but did not record a time as he was disqualified on his first run after he went out the slalom line. His take away from the experience is not to let the pressure of expectations affect him.

Ceccarelli competed for the Philippines at the 2026 Winter Olympics in his adopted country co-hosted by Milan and Cortina d'Ampezzo. He aimed to rank among the top 50 in the world.

== Olympic results ==
Year
Year	Age	Slalom	Giant slalom	Super-G	Downhill	Team combined
2026	22	DNF	54	—	—	—
