= Philippines at the 2018 Winter Olympics =

- Flag of the Philippines
- IOC code: PHI
- NOC: Philippine Olympic Committee

in Pyeongchang, South Korea February 9–25, 2018
- Competitors: 2 in 2 sports
- Flag bearers: Asa Miller (opening and closing)
- Officials: Tom Carrasco Jr., Chef de Mission
- Medals: Gold 0 Silver 0 Bronze 0 Total 0

Winter Olympics appearances (overview)
- 1972; 1976–1984; 1988; 1992; 1994–2010; 2014; 2018; 2022; 2026

The Philippines competed at the 2018 Winter Olympics in Pyeongchang, South Korea, from 9 to 25 February 2018. The country was represented by two male athletes, a figure skater and an alpine skier.

== Background ==
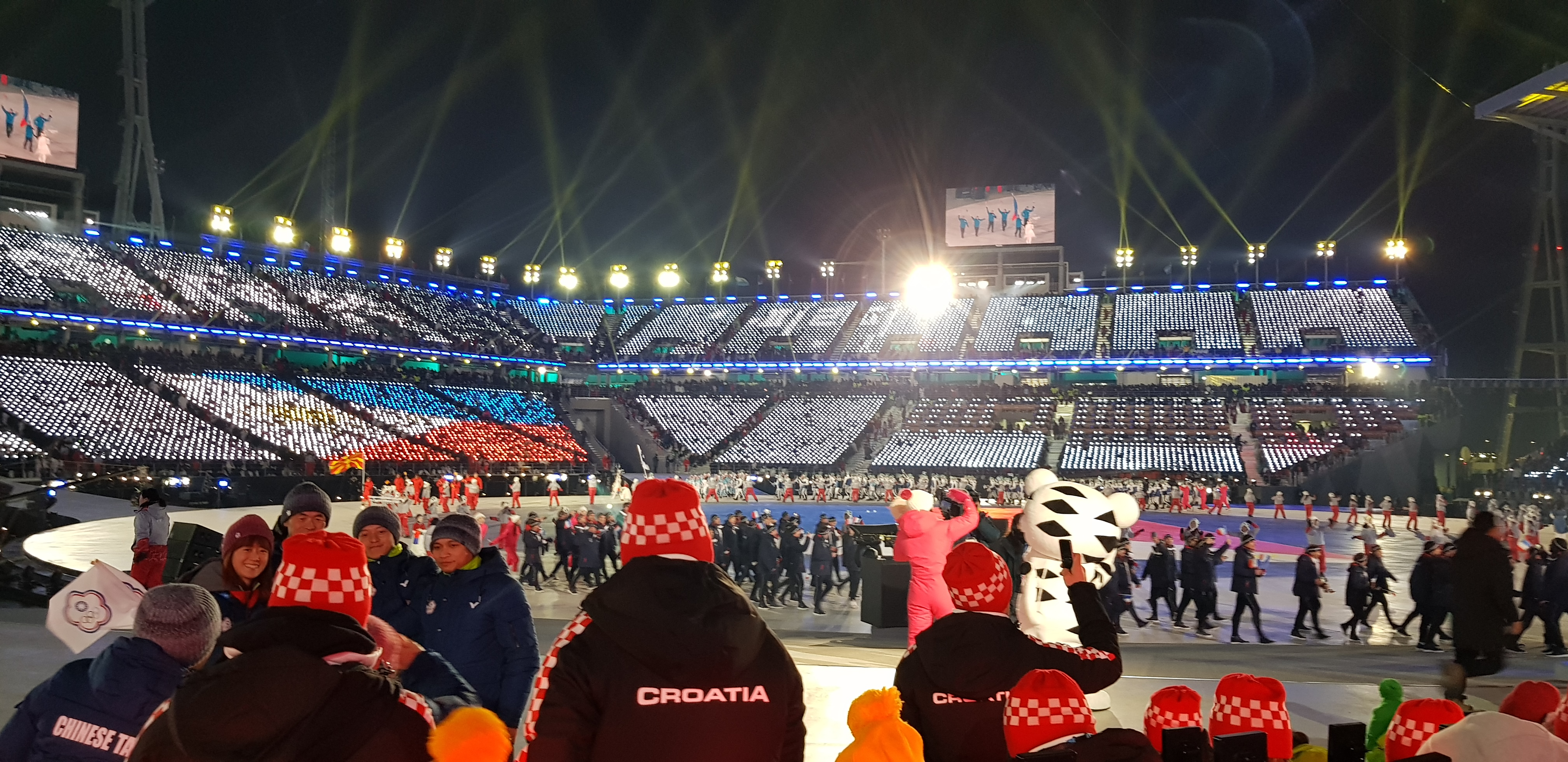
The Philippine delegation and flag being featured during the opening ceremony.

The Philippines made its second consecutive participation at the Winter Olympic Games after they participated in the 2014 edition in Sochi, Russia. They had previously achieved this feat when they participated in the 1988 and 1992 editions.

Michael Christian Martinez, the sole competitor for the Philippines in 2014, originally failed to qualify for the 2018 edition of the Games after failing to secure qualification through the 2017 CS Nebelhorn Trophy. However, after Sweden returned their quota spot in January 2018, the Philippines was assigned the quota spot, thereby allowing Michael Christian Martinez to compete in the Olympics.

The Philippines was also assigned a quota spot for a male athlete in alpine skiing by the International Ski Federation. Asa Miller, who was also the country's flag bearer in the opening ceremony, is set to compete for the Philippines in the sport.

Tom Carrasco, Jr., who is the chef de mission for the Philippine delegation, has said he is "not expecting much" from the participation and is just looking to build experience of the athletes.

== Competitors ==
The following is the list of number of competitors which participated in the delegation per sport.

| Sport | Men | Women | Total |
|---|---|---|---|
| Alpine skiing | 1 | 0 | 1 |
| Figure skating | 1 | 0 | 1 |
| Total | 2 | 0 | 2 |

== Alpine skiing ==
The Philippines achieved the following quota place.

| Athlete | Event | Run 1 | | Run 2 | | Total | |
| Athlete | Event | Time | Rank | Time | Rank | Time | Rank |
|---|---|---|---|---|---|---|---|
| Asa Miller | Men's giant slalom | 1:27.52 | 81 | 1:22.43 | 68 | 2:49.95 | 70 |

The country's single quota place was filled in by Asa Miller. Miller, who resides in Oregon within the United States, is allowed to compete for the Philippines due to his dual citizenship. Miller made a fundraising campaign through GoFundMe for his Olympic stint though the Philippine Olympic Committee has volunteered to finance his expenses. Miller is the first Filipino born in the 2000s to qualify for the Winter Olympics.

In the giant slalom event contested on February 18, Miller entered the course at 104th in both the 1st and 2nd runs. In the first run, Miller had a slight slip but was able to finish the course clocking 1:27.52 for 81st place while in the second run he recorded a time of 1:22.43 for 68th place. His total run for the giant slalom was 2:49.95 finishing 70th overall. 110 skiers participated. Among them only 85 completed the first run, and 75 finished the second and final run. Miller's total time was 31.91 seconds behind gold medalist Marcel Hirscher of Austria.

== Figure skating ==
The Philippines achieved the following quota place.

| Athlete | Event | SP | | FS | | Total | |
| Athlete | Event | Points | Rank | Points | Rank | Points | Rank |
|---|---|---|---|---|---|---|---|
| Michael Christian Martinez | Men's singles | 55.56 | 28 | did not advance | | | |

Michael Christian Martinez is the sole competitor for the Philippines in figure skating. He initially failed to qualify for Winter Olympics after not making a sufficient finish at the CS Nebelhorn Trophy in September 2017. On January 23, 2018, he was informed that he is eligible to participate in the Games after Sweden returned a quota place and went back to training. At that time he had already retired from figure skating to focus in body building and had to crash diet to reduce his weight from 75 kg (165 lb) to 68 kg (150 lb). He and his coach, Slava Zagor left for Pyeongchang from Los Angeles on February 5, 2018.

Martinez was the sixth to skate in the short program skated to the tune of “Emerald Tiger” by Vanessa-Mae in the short program where he accumulated a total of 55.56 points (26.04 points credited to elements performed). He placed 28th among 30 competitors besting only Felipe Montoya of Spain and Yaroslav Paniot of Ukraine and failed to advance to the free skate program by placing within the bottom six in the short program. He planned skate to the songs “El Tango de Roxanne” from Moulin Rouge! and “Tango de los Exilados” in the free skate program.

Chef de mission, Tom Carrasco remarked Martinez did his best given the skater's "condition and circumstances". According to the official, Zagor described Martinez' short program as "not a bad performance".

== See also ==
- Philippines at the 2017 Asian Winter Games
- Philippines at the 2018 Summer Youth Olympics
