= Asa Miller =

Filipino American alpine skier

Personal information
- Born: June 14, 2000 (age 26) Portland, Oregon, U.S.
- Height: 173 cm (5 ft 8 in) (2018)

Skiing career
- Sport: Alpine skiing ♂
- Club: Snowbird Sports Education Foundation (SBSEF)
- Disciplines: Giant slalom, slalom

Olympics
- Teams: 2 – (2018, 2022)

Asa Bisquera Miller (born June 14, 2000) is a Filipino American alpine skier who competed for the Philippines at the Winter Olympics in the giant slalom and slalom. He competed in the 2018 and 2022 Winter Olympics, also serving as the flagbearer for his country during the respective game's opening ceremonies. He previously participated in the 2017 World Junior Alpine Skiing Championships in Sweden.

== Early life and education ==
Miller was born on June 14, 2000 in Portland, Oregon, in the United States, where he also spent his childhood. His father is Kelly Miller, a ski patroller in Mount Hood while his mother is Polly Bisquera whose roots traces to Santa Cruz, Manila, in the Philippines. His first experience in skiing was when he was 1½ years old.

He studied at Lincoln High School in Portland for his secondary education. He would play baseball for Lincoln from 2015 to 2016 as a catcher. However, Miller focused on pursuing a career in competitive alpine skiing. As of February 2018, he was in his senior year. He attended Westminster College in Salt Lake City.

== Career ==
Asa Miller credits his father for influencing him to participate in competitive alpine skiing. He was part of the Portland-based Mt. Hood Meadows race team, and has been on the team for about a decade as of 2018. He was eight years old when he participated in his first race. His coaches at Mt. Hood Meadows are Erik Gilbert, AJ Kitt, and Brad Saxe. He trained two seasons with the Aspen Valley Ski and Snowboard Club and is currently a member of Snowbird Sports Education Foundation.

=== Junior World Championships ===
At the 2017 World Junior Alpine Skiing Championships in Åre, Sweden, Miller was among the participants. He competed for the Philippines in the slalom, giant slalom, super-G, and alpine combined, but he only finished the slalom. Miller ranked 39th among skiers who finished the slalom.

=== Winter Olympics ===
Miller realized in 2016 that he could compete for the Philippines in the Winter Olympics. He has dual citizenship for the U.S. and the Philippines, the latter acquired from his mother.

Miller qualified for the 2018 Winter Olympics in Pyeongchang, South Korea, by accumulating sufficient points set by the International Ski Federation. For his qualification he participated in races within the United States as well as in Canada, Australia, New Zealand, and Sweden. He was coached by AJ Kitt, who has represented the United States in four Winter Olympics, as well as by Erik Gilbert and Brad Saxe. For his 2018 Olympic qualification and journey, his family held a fundraising campaign through GoFundMe, while the Philippine Olympic Committee funded his Olympic participation expenses.

Miller is one of only two athletes representing the Philippines at the 2018 Winter Olympics, the other being Michael Christian Martinez. He was the flag bearer for his country in the opening ceremony, on February 9 and the closing ceremony on February 25. Miller is also the youngest Winter Olympian for the Philippines being 17 years old at the time of the Sochi tournament.

His only participation at the games was in the giant slalom event, which took place on February 18. He concluded his participation in the race with a time of 2:49.95, ranking 70th out of 110 participants.

He participated in the 2022 Winter Olympics in Beijing, China competing in both giant slalom and slalom becoming the first alpine skier to represent the Philippines to compete in two Winter Olympics. As the lone competitor, he reprised his role as the country's flagbearer during the opening ceremony.

Miller incurred "did not finish" records for both the giant slalom and slalom events. Miller crashed out 20 seconds into the first run of the giant slalom due to heavy snowfall. For the slalom, Miller skied for 36 seconds in his failed first run.

=== Olympic results ===
Year
Year	Age	Slalom	Giant; Slalom	Super G	Downhill	Combined
2018	17	—	70	—	—	—
2022	21	DNF	DNF	—	—	—

== Personal life ==
Aside from alpine skiing, he also plays baseball and does hiking and scuba diving as recreation. In addition to English, Miller can also speak French.

Olympic Games
Preceded by Eumir Marcial; Kiyomi Watanabe	Flagbearer for Philippines; Beijing 2022	Succeeded by Carlo Paalam; Nesthy Petecio
Olympic Games
Preceded by Ian Lariba	Flagbearer for Philippines; Pyeongchang 2018	Succeeded by Eumir Marcial; Kiyomi Watanabe
