= Philippines at the 1972 Winter Olympics =

- Flag of the Philippines
- IOC code: PHI
- NOC: Philippine Olympic Committee
- Website: www.olympic.ph

in Sapporo
- Competitors: 2 (men) in 1 sport
- Medals: Gold 0 Silver 0 Bronze 0 Total 0

Winter Olympics appearances (overview)
- 1972; 1976–1984; 1988; 1992; 1994–2010; 2014; 2018; 2022; 2026

The Philippines competed in the Winter Olympic Games for the first time at the 1972 Winter Olympics in Sapporo, Japan with two athletes who competed in alpine skiing. The country was also the first tropical nation and Southeast Asian country to feature in the Winter Olympics.

== Background and delegation ==
The Olympic attaché was Adelaide Nalundasan of the Embassy of the Philippines. There were two athletes representing the country, both in alpine skiing. Jorge R. Vargas was the representative for the Philippines in the International Olympic Committee.

== Alpine skiing ==
Cousins Juan Cipriano and Ben Nanasca represented the Philippines in alpine skiing. They were adopted as teenagers by a family in New Zealand and were part of a development team funded by the Swiss government.

Men

Athlete	Event	Race 1		Race 2		Total	
Athlete	Event	Time	Rank	Time	Rank	Time	Rank
Juan Cipriano	Giant Slalom	1:58.00	51	DNF	–	DNF	–
Ben Nanasca	Giant Slalom	1:54.59	48	2:11.61	46	4:06.20	42

Men's slalom

Athlete	Classification		Final					
Athlete	Time	Rank	Time 1	Rank	Time 2	Rank	Total	Rank
Juan Cipriano	DNF	–	DNF	–	–		DNF	–
Ben Nanasca	2:07.69	7	?	43	DNF	–	DNF	–
