= Tallulah Proulx =

Filipino alpine skier (born 2008)

Personal information
- National team: Philippines
- Born: May 8, 2008 (age 18) United States

Skiing career
- Sport: Alpine skiing
- Club: Sno-Gophers
- Disciplines: Giant slalom, slalom

Olympics
- Teams: 1 – (2026)

Tallulah Proulx (born May 8, 2008) is an alpine skier competing for the Philippines. She is the first ever female athlete to compete for the country in the Winter Olympics debuting in the 2026 edition.

== Early life and education ==
Born on May 8, 2008, in the United States to James Proulx and Maia Hightower, Tallulah Proulx grew up in Berkeley, California. She took up alpine skiing when she was three years old during a family vacation in Lake Tahoe. At age seven, Tallulah moved to Iowa due to her mother's employers.

In 2017, at age ten, Proulx was enrolled by her parents in a six-day-a-week ski program in Vail, Colorado before moving to Park City, Utah a year later. She attended Rowland Hall in Salt Lake City. After six years, she moved to the Winter Sports School. She graduated in December 2025.

== Career ==
Proulx started skiing competitively at age seven. She has been part of the Sno-Gophers Ski Club and the Park City Ski Team.

In 2018, Proulx was representing Iowa-based Sundown Race Team. She later got sponsored by the National Brotherhood of Snowsports, a non-profit organization catering to minorities in the United States. She has been under a scholarship with the NBS since the 2021–2022 season.

Proulx began representing the Philippines in FIS-sanctioned tournaments from August 2024. In the same year, Perry Schaffner became her coach. Her competing for the Philippines was inspired from Filipino alpine skier Asa Miller's participation in the 2018 Winter Olympics which led to the Proulx family's move to Park City in Utah in 2019. The Proulx family also concluded it would be more difficult to earn a slot in the United States ski team than to represent the Philippines.

She skied for the Philippines at the 2025 Asian Winter Games in China finishing 16th in the slalom. She qualified for the 2026 Winter Olympics in Milan and Cortina d'Ampezzo.

Still under Schaffner's tutulege, Proulx completed two runs in her Olympic debut at the women's giant slalom event finishing 52nd. Proulx became the first woman to compete for the Philippines in the Winter Olympics.

== Personal life ==
Proulx is originally from California before moving to Park City, Utah in 2019. She is a dual citizen of the Philippines and the United States. She is partly of African American and Chinese descent through her mother. Her Filipino heritage comes from her father whose family has roots in Eastern Samar, and she was inspired to represent the Philippines by her Filipina grandmother. She is also a K-pop fan, plays the violin, and does crocheting.

== Olympic results ==
Year
| Year | Age | Slalom | Giant slalom | Super-G | Downhill | Team combined |
| 2026 | 17 | 50 | 52 | — | — | — |
