= Raymond Ocampo =

Filipino luger

Personal information
- Full name: Raymond L. Ocampo, Jr.
- Nationality: Filipino-American
- Born: February 10, 1953 (age 73) Lubao, Pampanga, Philippines

Sport
- Country: Philippines
- Sport: Luge

Raymond L. Ocampo, Jr. (born February 10, 1953) is a retired Filipino-American luger. He represented the Philippines at the 1988 Winter Olympics. He participated at the Winter Olympics' men's singles event where he ranked 35 out of 38 overall. His Winter Olympic stint was almost put in jeopardy due to some issues with the kind of passport he should be holding to represent the Philippines at the Olympics. The Philippine Olympic Committee eventually allowed him to compete under the Philippine flag without a Philippine passport despite previously requiring Ocampo the said type of passport. Ocampo previously insisted that under the rules by the IOC that he as a Filipino-American dual citizen is eligible to represent the Philippines as he did not compete for another country as a luger prior to the Olympics. Ocampo first competed at the 1986 Empire State Games. Ocampo is also a lawyer.

Ocampo was designated as honorary captain of the national luge team of the United States at the 2010 Winter Olympics in Vancouver.

Ocampo is the current President and CEO of Samurai Surfer LLC, a private consulting and investment company.
