= Michael Christian Martinez =

Filipino figure skater (born 1996)

Michael Christian Martinez OLY
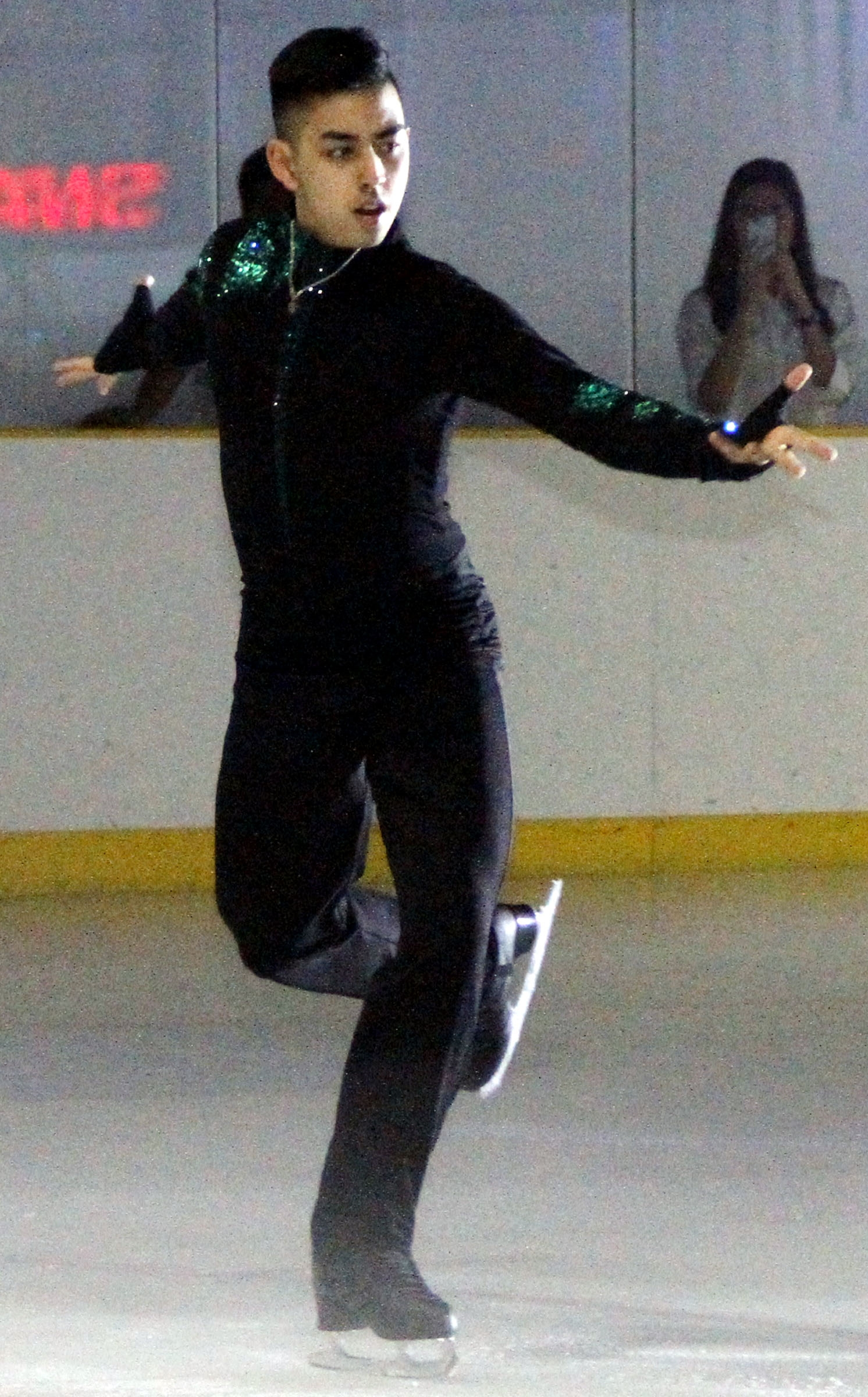
- Martinez in 2018

Personal information
- Full name: Michael Christian Martinez
- Other names: Mikee Martinez
- Born: November 4, 1996 (age 30) Parañaque, Philippines
- Home town: Muntinlupa, Philippines
- Height: 1.75 m (5 ft 9 in)

Figure skating career
- Country: Philippines
- Coach: Nikolai Morozov
- Skating club: Metro ISC
- Began skating: 2005
- Retired: 2022
Medal record
Representing Philippines
Men's Figure skating
Asian Trophy
Gold medal – first place	2015 Bangkok	Men's singles
Southeast Asian Games
Silver medal – second place	2017 Kuala Lumpur	Men's singles

Michael Christian "Mikee" Martinez (born November 4, 1996) is a Filipino Olympic figure skater. He is the 2015 Asian Figure Skating Trophy champion, a two-time Triglav Trophy champion and has won one ISU Challenger Series medal, silver at the 2014 Warsaw Cup. Martinez is the first skater from Southeast Asia and from a tropical country to qualify for the Olympics, was the only athlete to represent the Philippines at the 2014 Winter Olympics, and was one of only two to represent the Philippines at the 2018 Winter Olympics.

== Early life ==
Martinez was born on November 4, 1996, in Parañaque, the youngest of three children. He began experiencing asthmatic bronchitis at two months old and was frequently in the hospital. Although a cold rink initially had a detrimental effect, he stated in 2014 that, "year after year my health keeps improving, so my mother fully supported me to continue skating. She said it's better to spend the money on skating than in the hospital." Martinez graduated from high school in 2013.

== Career ==
=== Early years ===
Martinez began skating in 2005 at the SM Southmall ice rink. In 2009, he missed two months after a skating blade cut his thigh. In addition to training in Manila, in 2010 he began spending several months a year in California, United States working with John Nicks and Ilia Kulik.

Martinez debuted on the ISU Junior Grand Prix (JGP) series in the 2010–11 season. In 2011, he tore two ligaments in his ankle, leading to three months of recovery. In April 2012, he tore a medial ligament in his knee and was off the ice for three months.

=== 2012–13 season: First senior international title ===
Martinez landed his first triple Axel jump in competition at a 2012 JGP event in Lake Placid, New York. He placed 6th at a JGP competition in Zagreb, Croatia.

At the 2012 Crystal Skate of Romania, Martinez won his first senior international title, also a first for the Philippines. He finished fifth in his second appearance at the 2013 World Junior Figure Skating Championships and set a new personal-best overall score of 191.64 points. A fractured ankle kept him off the ice for two months in 2013.

=== 2013–14 season: Sochi Olympics ===
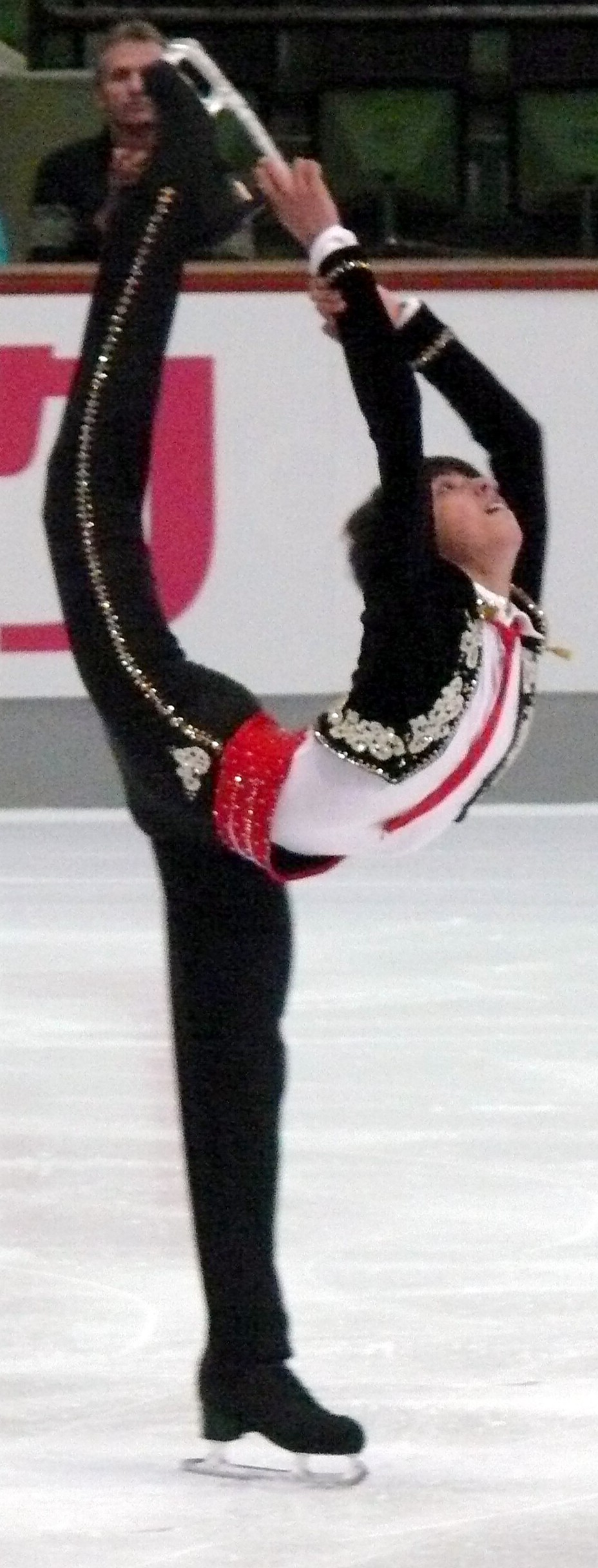
Martinez executing a Biellmann spin at the 2013 Nebelhorn Trophy

Martinez started his season at the 2013 JGP Latvia where he finished 4th. He then competed on the senior level at the 2013 Nebelhorn Trophy, the last qualifying event for the 2014 Winter Olympics. He finished 7th and earned a spot for the Philippines in men's singles — a first for his country. Martinez then competed at the 2013 JGP Estonia and won his first JGP medal, a bronze. In January 2014, he received treatment for an inflamed knee. He withdrew from the 2014 Four Continents Championships but competed at Skate Helena and took the gold medal.

The first skater in the Winter Olympics to come from Southeast Asia, Martinez was also the only athlete representing the Philippines at the 2014 Winter Olympics in Sochi and served as his country's flagbearer at the opening ceremony. Viktor Kudriavtsev coached him for one month leading up to the Olympics. At the Olympics, Martinez qualified for the free skate after placing 19th in the short program with a score of 64.81 points, a season best. He scored 119.44 in the free skate and finished 19th overall with a total score of 184.25.

MVP Sports Foundation supported the skater and announced a bonus of $10,000 after the Olympics. He was named an adopted son of Pasay by Mayor Antonino Calixto.

Recovering from a recurring knee injury after the Olympics, Martinez was replaced by Christopher Caluza at the 2014 World Championships. He returned to competition in April at the Triglav Trophy, where he won the gold medal. In June 2014, he began training at Hackensack, New Jersey's Ice House, under the guidance of Nikolai Morozov.

=== 2014–15 season: Challenger Series medal ===
Making his ISU Challenger Series (CS) debut, Martinez finished sixth overall at the Lombardia Trophy. He was assigned to his first senior Grand Prix event, the 2014 Skate America. In his short program, he fell on his triple Axel, but landed all his other jumps and received level fours on his camel spin, his flying sit spin, and his step sequence; he finished ninth. He also placed ninth in the free skate, falling on his triple Axel, under-rotating his triple toe in the triple Lutz-triple toe combination, and stepping out in his double Axel towards the end of the program. Martinez finished tenth overall.

In November 2014, Martinez competed at the CS Warsaw Cup where he won the silver medal behind Russia's Alexander Petrov. Martinez posted new personal-best scores with a total of 213.38 points. Martinez competed in his first Worlds at the 2015 World Championships, finishing in 21st position.

=== 2015–16 season: Asian Trophy title ===
Martinez withdrew from several summer competitions due to ongoing therapy and rehabilitation for his spine. He also was unable to compete at the 2015 CS U.S. International Classic due to acute asthma.

He started his season by winning gold at the 2015 Asian Figure Skating Trophy, becoming the first Filipino to win the event. He then competed at 2015 Cup of China where he finished 6th with a new personal-best overall score of 220.36 points. He placed 4th at the 2015 CS Warsaw Cup and 7th at the 2015 CS Golden Spin of Zagreb.

Martinez went on to achieve his best placements at senior ISU Championships. In February, he finished 9th out of 23 competitors at the 2016 Four Continents Championships in Taipei. Competing a month later at the 2016 World Championships in Boston, he finished 19th out of 30 competitors. Due to inconsistency in training, he dropped his original plan of including a quad jump, deciding to include the jump the following season.

=== 2016–17 season ===
At the 2017 Four Continents Championships, Martinez placed 14th in the short program, free skate and overall. At the 2017 Asian Winter Games, a multi-sport event held every four years, he placed 7th in the short program, 9th in the free skate, and 9th overall. At the 2017 World Championships, Martinez placed 24th in the short program and free skate, as well as overall.

=== 2017–18 season : Pyeongchang Olympics ===
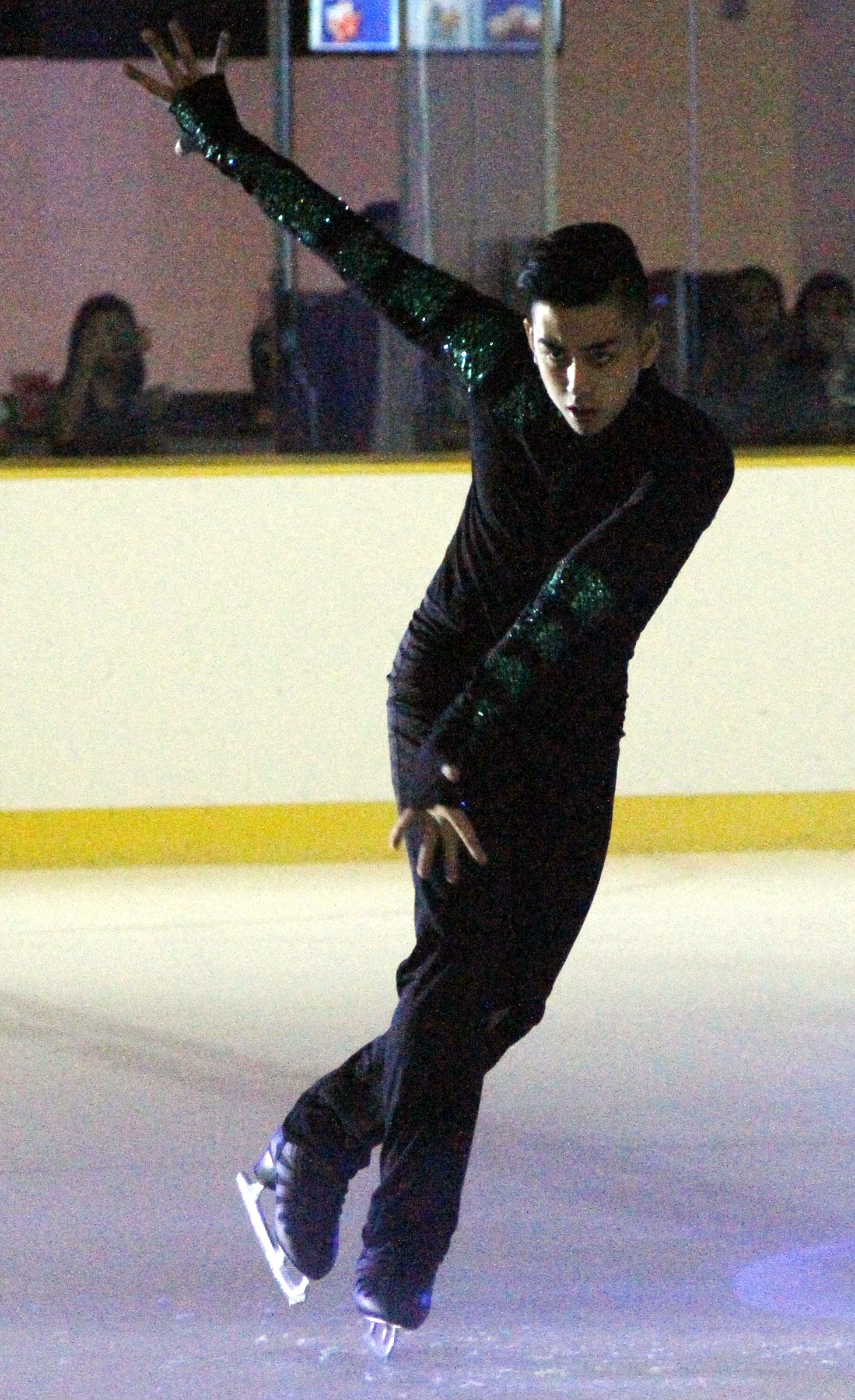
Martinez repeats his 2018 Winter Olympic Games routine at the SM Mall of Asia ice skating rink.

At the 2017 Southeast Asian Games, Martinez won silver behind Malaysia's Julian Yee. In September, he placed 8th at the 2017 CS Nebelhorn Trophy, the final qualifying opportunity for the 2018 Winter Olympics. Due to his result, his country did not qualify in figure skating but finished as the first alternate. Sometime after the Nebelhorn Trophy competition, considering the end of his sponsorship, he decided to retire from figure skating to return to business law studies and be assistant in a Law Office, altogether with body building, bulking up to 75 kg (165 lb) from his usual 66 kg (146 lb).

In January 2018, after Sweden relinquished its Olympic spot, it was transferred to the Philippines, allowing Martinez to compete in South Korea. He returned to training under coach Slava Zagor and adopted a crash diet, managing to reduce his weight to 68 kg (150 lb). The short program of the figure skating men's singles at the 2018 Winter Olympics was contested on February 16, 2018. Martinez was the sixth to perform, skating to the tune of “Emerald Tiger” by Vanessa-Mae, garnering a total of 55.56 points finishing 28th out of 30 competitors. He failed to advance to the free skate after not placing among the top 24. Had he advanced, he planned skate to the songs “El Tango de Roxanne” from Moulin Rouge! and “Tango de los Exilados” in the free skate program, which were the same songs he used in the 2017 Southeast Asian Games.

Despite failing to advance, Tom Carrasco, the chef de mission of Philippine delegation to the Games remarked that Martinez did his best given the skater's "condition and circumstances" and the official relayed that Zagor described Martinez's short program as "not a bad performance".

=== 2018–2021: Hiatus ===
After the Pyeongchang stint, Martinez said he will not retire and will just rest for a short while. He has stated that he will prepare for the 2019 Southeast Asian Games. Though in September 2018, Martinez's break from the sport has been described as an indefinite leave with no time table on when he will resume skating. He also went on to become a coach and a social media influencer in the United States; he has been occasionally frequenting the country since 2010.

Martinez did not participate in the 2019 Southeast Asian Games, with the Philippine Skating Union saying that he declined take part in the national qualifiers. However it was later reported that his non-participation was due to a miscommunication between Martinez and the sports federation.

Though in 2019, he didn't engage in competitive skating, Martinez maintained his fitness by doing workouts and routines. By December 2019, Martinez is already part of a new management team, DigiStar PH. It is reported that he will resume training in 2020.

=== 2022: Brief return ===
Martinez remarked that he has made mistakes in his life and vowed to return to competitive skating intending to qualify for the 2022 Winter Olympics. He began training with New Jersey–based Russian coach Nikolai Morozov. However amidst to the COVID-19 pandemic, Martinez has returned to the Philippines in June 2020 where his training was limited to outside the skating rink due to pandemic-related measures. His immediate goal is to qualify for the 2021 World Figure Skating Championships but was not able to do so.

On April 7, 2021, Martinez declared himself to be "officially back on ice" and plans to join the CS Nebelhorn Trophy in September 2021 as part of a bid to qualify for the 2022 Winter Olympics. He started a fundraising for his campaign with his management team, Virtual Playground and the Philippine Skating Federation helping him secure sponsors.

The Philippine Skating Union (PhSU) is limited to one entry for each gender for the Nebelhorn Trophy, with Martinez having to contend against Christopher Caluza and Edrian Celestino for the berth in the federation's Olympic Qualifier Evaluation. However, due to an injury, Martinez decided foregoing his bid to qualify for the Nebelhorn Trophy, consequentially for the Winter Olympics.

=== 2026: Second return ===
In late 2026, Martinez returns again in competitive skating taking part in the Philippine Figure Skating Championships both as a competitor and a coach.

=== Coaching ===
The PhSU offered Martinez a coaching job, after an exodus of its coaches due to the COVID-19 pandemic. Martinez was initially reluctant but accepted the offer. He is now coaching with SM Supermalls as of October 2022. He has coached before for around four years in the United States.

Martinez expressed willingness to return to competing but has find himself focusing on his coaching role.

== Programs ==
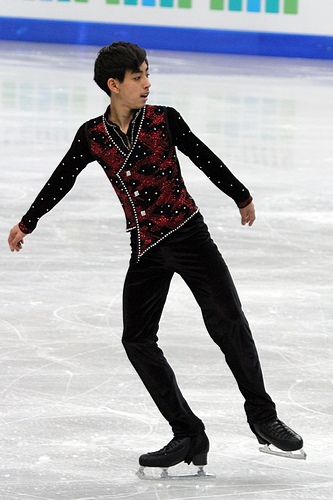
Martinez at the 2012 World Junior Championships

Season	Short program	Free skating	Exhibition
2021–2022	Requiem For A Dream; Requiem For A Tower arranged and re-orchestrated by Jonas Kvarnström and Escala	Kamado Tanjiro No Uta (from Demon Slayer: Kimetsu no Yaiba)	
2017–2018	Carmina Burana by Carl Orff; Emerald Tiger by Vanessa-Mae	El Tango de Roxanne (from Moulin Rouge!); Tango de los Exilados by Walter Taieb performed by Vanessa-Mae	
2016–2017	Emerald Tiger by Vanessa-Mae	Nella Fantasia by Russell Watson	Halo performed by LaVanceColley
2015–2016	Egmont by Ludwig van Beethoven	Romeo and Juliet by Sergei Prokofiev	Chasing Cars by Snow Patrol; Nocturne into Bohemian Rhapsody by Queen
2014–2015	Piano Concerto No. 2 by Sergei Rachmaninoff	The Phantom of the Opera by Andrew Lloyd Webber choreo. by Nikolai Morozov	
2013–2014	Romeo and Juliet by Nino Rota choreo. by Philip Mills	Malagueña by Ernesto Lecuona choreo. by Justin Dillon	Nocturne into Bohemian Rhapsody by Queen
2012–2013	Toccata and Fugue in D minor by Johann Sebastian Bach performed by Vanessa-Mae	King Arthur by Hans Zimmer	
2010–2012	The Jellicle Ball (from Cats) by Andrew Lloyd Webber	Tango De Los Exilados by Walter Taieb performed by Vanessa-Mae	

== Competitive highlights ==
GP: Grand Prix; CS: Challenger Series; JGP: Junior Grand Prix

International
Event	10–11	11–12	12–13	13–14	14–15	15–16	16–17	17–18	21–22	26–27
Olympics				19th				28th		
Worlds					21st	19th	24th			
Four Continents			16th	WD	WD	9th	14th			
GP Cup of China						6th				
GP Skate America					10th					
CS Cup of Austria									23rd	
CS Finlandia						9th			24th	
CS Golden Spin					6th	7th				
CS Lombardia					6th					
CS Nebelhorn								8th		
CS Warsaw Cup					2nd	4th				
Asian Trophy						1st				
Asian Games							9th			
Crystal Skate			1st							
Nebelhorn				7th						
New Year's Cup			3rd							
NRW Trophy			13th							
Skate Helena				1st						
SEA Games								2nd		
Triglav Trophy				1st	1st					
U.S. Classic				6th						
Volvo Open Cup				4th			5th			
International: Junior or novice
Junior Worlds		15th	5th							
Youth Olympics		7th								
JGP Australia		8th								
JGP Croatia			6th							
JGP Estonia				3rd						
JGP Japan	17th									
JGP Latvia				4th						
JGP U.S.			4th							
National
Philippine Champs.			3rd				1st			3rd

== Detailed results ==
2021–22 season
Date	Event	SP	FS	Total
November 11–14, 2021	2021 CS Cup of Austria	25; 57.50	23; 108.97	23; 166.47
October 7–10, 2021	2021 CS Finlandia Trophy	23; 55.62	24; 101.16	24; 156.78
2017–18 season
Date	Event	SP	FS	Total
September 27–30, 2017	2017 CS Nebelhorn Trophy	8; 67.50	9; 124.24	8; 191.74
August 26–27, 2017	2017 Southeast Asian Games	2; 54.74	2; 116.89	2; 171.63
2016–17 season
Date	Event	SP	FS	Total
March 29–April 2, 2017	2017 World Championships	24; 69.32	24; 127.47	24; 196.79
February 23–26, 2017	2017 Asian Winter Games	7; 76.53	9; 135.43	9; 211.96
February 16–19, 2017	2017 Four Continents Championships	14; 72.47	14; 141.68	14; 214.15
2015–16 season
Date	Event	SP	FS	Total
November 27–29, 2015	2015 Warsaw Cup	6; 65.64	4; 140.66	4; 206.30
November 5–8, 2015	2015 Cup of China	7; 72.24	5; 148.12	6; 220.36
October 8–11, 2015	2015 Finlandia Trophy	7; 65.18	9; 125.36	9; 190.54
August 5–8, 2015	2015 Asian Figure Skating Trophy	1; 72.14	1; 116.39	1; 188.53
2014–15 season
Date	Event	SP	FS	Total
April 16–19, 2015	2015 Triglav Trophy	5; 51.68	1; 130.16	1; 181.84
March 23–29, 2015	2015 World Championships	22; 67.03	20; 125.35	21; 192.38
November 21–24, 2014	2014 Golden Spin	4; 74.45	6; 130.00	6; 204.45
November 21–24, 2014	2014 Warsaw Cup	2; 73.81	2; 139.57	2; 213.38
October 24–26, 2014	2014 Skate America	9; 72.81	9; 124.77	10; 197.58
September 21–22, 2014	2014 Lombardia Trophy	6; 67.36	5; 132.56	5; 199.92

Olympic Games
Preceded by Hidilyn Diaz	Flagbearer for Philippines; Sochi 2014	Succeeded by Ian Lariba
