= Curling at the 2026 Winter Olympics – Qualification =

The curling competition at the 2026 Winter Olympics will feature a total of 30 teams. There will be 10 teams participating in each of the three disciplines: Men's, Women's, and Mixed Doubles. In the Men's and Women's events, each team will consist of 5 athletes, while the Mixed Doubles teams will have 2 athletes each. This means that up to 120 athletes will be competing across all disciplines.

== Summary ==
=== Final summary ===
As the host country of the 2026 Winter Olympics, Italy will have teams participating in all three disciplines of curling. This marks Italy's second participation in the Women's event, with their previous appearance dating back to the last time Italy hosted the Winter Olympics in 2006. It will also mark Estonia's debut in curling at the Olympics.

Nations	Men	Women	Mixed doubles	Athletes
Canada	Yes	Yes	Yes	12
China	Yes	Yes		10
Czech Republic	Yes		Yes	7
Denmark		Yes		5
Estonia			Yes	2
Germany	Yes			5
Great Britain	Yes	Yes	Yes	12
Italy	Yes	Yes	Yes	12
Japan		Yes		5
Norway	Yes		Yes	7
South Korea		Yes	Yes	7
Sweden	Yes	Yes	Yes	12
Switzerland	Yes	Yes	Yes	12
United States	Yes	Yes	Yes	12
Total: 14 NOCs	10	10	10	120

=== Men ===
Means of qualification	Dates	Location	Quotas	Qualified
Host nation	—N/a		1	Italy
Qualification points at the 2024 & 2025 World Championships	30 March–7 April 2024	Schaffhausen, Switzerland	7	Great Britain; Canada; Sweden; Switzerland; Germany; Norway; Czech Republic
Qualification points at the 2024 & 2025 World Championships	29 March–6 April 2025	Moose Jaw, Canada	7	Great Britain; Canada; Sweden; Switzerland; Germany; Norway; Czech Republic
Olympic Qualification Event	6–13 December 2025	Kelowna, Canada	2	United States; China
Total			10	

=== Women ===
Means of qualification	Dates	Location	Quotas	Qualified
Host nation	—N/a		1	Italy
Qualification points at the 2024 & 2025 World Championships	16–24 March 2024	Sydney, Canada	7	Canada; Switzerland; South Korea; Sweden; Denmark; Great Britain; China
Qualification points at the 2024 & 2025 World Championships	15–23 March 2025	Uijeongbu, South Korea	7	Canada; Switzerland; South Korea; Sweden; Denmark; Great Britain; China
Olympic Qualification Event	6–13 December 2025	Kelowna, Canada	2	Japan; United States
Total			10	

=== Mixed doubles ===
Means of qualification	Dates	Location	Quotas	Qualified
Host nation	—N/a		1	Italy
Qualification points at the 2024 & 2025 World Championships	20–27 April 2024	Östersund, Sweden	7	Estonia; Sweden; Great Britain; Norway; Canada; Switzerland; United States
Qualification points at the 2024 & 2025 World Championships	26 April–3 May 2025	Fredericton, Canada	7	Estonia; Sweden; Great Britain; Norway; Canada; Switzerland; United States
Olympic Qualification Event	13–18 December 2025	Kelowna, Canada	2	Czech Republic; South Korea
Total			10	

== Qualification timeline ==
Event	Date	Venue
2024 World Women's Curling Championship	16–24 March 2024	Sydney, Canada
2024 World Men's Curling Championship	30 March–7 April 2024	Schaffhausen, Switzerland
2024 World Mixed Doubles Curling Championship	20–27 April 2024	Östersund, Sweden
2025 World Women's Curling Championship	15–23 March 2025	Uijeongbu, South Korea
2025 World Men's Curling Championship	29 March–6 April 2025	Moose Jaw, Canada
2025 World Mixed Doubles Curling Championship	26 April–3 May 2025	Fredericton, Canada
2025 Pre-Olympic Qualification Event	7–11 October 2025	(United Kingdom) Aberdeen, Great Britain
2025 Olympic Qualification Event	6–19 December 2025	Kelowna, Canada

== Qualification system ==
Qualification to the curling tournaments at the Winter Olympics will be determined through two methods. Nations will qualify teams by earning qualification points from performances at the 2024 and 2025 World Curling Championships. Teams will also qualify through an Olympic qualification event which will be held in December 2025. Seven nations will qualify teams via World Championship qualification points, while two nations will qualify through a qualification event to be held in December 2025. As host nation, Italy qualified teams automatically, thus making a total of ten teams per discipline in the curling tournaments.

In case of a tie in qualification points, the following criteria will be employed to resolve such ties: firstly, preference will be given to the nation that most recently appeared at the World Championship; secondly, if necessary, preference will be given to the nation that performed better at the 2025 World Championship, if that is a tie then whichever nation performed better at the 2024 World Championship will win the tie; and finally, if neither of the first two criteria suffice, a playoff will be arranged between the tied teams at a time and venue determined by World Curling.

=== Qualification points ===
The qualification points are allotted based on the nations' final rankings at the Men's and Women's World Championships. The points are distributed as follows:

Final rank	1	2	3	4	5	6	7	8	9	10	11	12	13
Points	15	13	11	10	9	8	7	6	5	4	3	2	1

The qualification points are allotted based on the nations' final rankings at the Mixed Doubles World Championships. The points are distributed as follows:

Final rank	1	2	3	4	5	6	7	8	9	10	11	12	13	14	15	16	17	18	19	20
Points	27	23	20	18	16	15	14	13	12	11	10	9	8	7	6	5	4	3	2	1

Note: Scotland, England and Wales all compete separately in international curling. By an agreement between the curling federations of those three home nations, only Scotland can score Olympic qualification points on behalf of Great Britain.

=== Qualification events ===
In order to qualify for the Olympic Qualification Event in the Men's and Women's disciplines, a nation must be ranked between 9th and 13th (or between 8th and 12th if Italy is not ranked in the top 8 teams of the discipline) based on the combined results of the 2024 and 2025 World Curling Championships. Alternatively, they can qualify by finishing in the top 3 at the Pre-Olympic Qualification Event. To be eligible for the Pre-Olympic Qualification Event, a nation must not have already qualified for the Olympics or the Olympic Qualification Event. They must have also qualified for either the 2024 or 2025 World Men's or Women's Championships, or have qualified in the A division of the 2024 or 2025 European Curling Championship or Pan Continental Curling Championships.

In the Mixed Doubles event, a nation can qualify for the Olympic Qualification Event by participating in either the 2024 World Mixed Doubles Curling Championship or the 2025 World Mixed Doubles Curling Championship. There will be no Pre-Olympic Qualification Event for this discipline. However, if the Olympic Qualification Event has less than 16 teams participating, the World Curling Federation Mixed Doubles Rankings as of May 1, 2025 will be used to determine the remaining berths until there are at least 16 teams participating in the Olympic Qualification Event.

== Qualification results ==
Key
Nation Qualified for the Olympic Games as host
Nation Qualified for the Olympic Games via Qualification Points from the 2024 & 2025 World Championships
Nation Qualified for the Olympic Games via the Olympic Qualification Event
Nation Qualified for the Olympic Qualification Event
Nation Qualified for the 2026 Winter Olympics

=== Men ===
Country	2024		2025		Total Points	Pre-OQE	OQE	2026 WOG
Country	Place	Points	Place	Points	Total Points	Pre-OQE	OQE	2026 WOG
Great Britain	4	10	1	15	25	→		
Canada	2	13	3	11	24	→		
Sweden	1	15	5	9	24	→		
Switzerland	7	7	2	13	20	→		
Germany	5	9	8	6	15	→		
Italy	3	11	10	4	15	→		
Norway	10	4	6	8	12	→		
Czech Republic	9	5	7	7	12	→		
United States	6	8	11	3	11	→	1	
China	X		4	10	10	→	2	
Japan	11	3	9	5	8	→	3	X
South Korea	12	2	13	1	3	→	4	X
Netherlands	8	6	X		6	→	5	X
Philippines	X		X		0	1	6	X
New Zealand	13	1	X		1	3	7	X
Poland	X		X		0	2	8	X
Denmark	X		X		0	4	X	X
Austria	X		12	2	2	5	X	X
Australia	X		X		0	6	X	X
Chinese Taipei	X		X		0	7	X	X

=== Women ===
Country	2024		2025		Total Points	Pre-OQE	OQE	2026 WOG
Country	Place	Points	Place	Points	Total Points	Pre-OQE	OQE	2026 WOG
Canada	1	15	1	15	30	→		
Switzerland	2	13	2	13	26	→		
South Korea	3	11	4	10	21	→		
Sweden	5	9	5	9	18	→		
Denmark	6	8	7	7	15	→		
Great Britain	8	6	6	8	14	→		
Italy	4	10	10	4	14	→		
China	X		3	11	11	→		
Japan	11	3	9	5	8	→	1	
United States	7	7	12	2	9	→	2	
Norway	9	5	8	6	11	→	3	X
Germany	X		X		0	2	4	X
Turkey	10	4	11	3	7	→	5	X
Estonia	12	2	X		2	→	6	X
Australia	X		X		0	3	7	X
Czech Republic	X		X		0	1	8	X
Hungary	X		X		0	4	X	X
Mexico	X		X		0	5	X	X
Lithuania	X		13	1	1	6	X	X
Chinese Taipei	X		X		0	7	X	X
New Zealand	13	1	X		1	DNP	X	X

=== Mixed doubles ===
Country	2024		2025		Total Points	WR	OQE	2026 WOG
Country	Place	Points	Place	Points	Total Points	WR	OQE	2026 WOG
Estonia	2	23	4	18	41	→		
Sweden	1	27	7	14	41	→		
Italy	8	13	1	27	40	→		
Great Britain	6	15	2	23	38	→		
Norway	3	20	8	13	33	→		
Canada	5	16	6	15	31	→		
Switzerland	4	18	11	10	28	→		
United States	10	11	5	16	27	→		
Czech Republic	16	5	16	5	10	→	1	
South Korea	7	14	12	9	23	→	2	
Australia	15	6	3	20	26	→	3	X
China	12	9	17	4	13	→	4	X
Japan	9	12	13	8	20	→	5	X
Netherlands	13	8	19	2	10	→	6	X
Denmark	14	7	15	6	13	→	7	X
Turkey	17	4	18	3	7	→	8	X
Germany	11	10	14	7	17	→	9	X
New Zealand	19	2	9	12	14	→	10	X
Hungary	X		X		0	16	11	X
Latvia	X		X		0	26	12	X
Finland	X		10	11	11	→	13	X
France	18	3	X		3	→	14	X
Spain	20	1	20	1	2	→	15	X
Austria	X		X		0	24	DNF	X

Note: Scotland, England and Wales compete separately at international level in curling. By an agreement between the curling federations of those three nations, only Scotland can score Olympic qualification points on behalf of Great Britain.

== National qualifying events ==
Some countries selected their teams through trial qualification tournaments.

- (Canada) 2025 Canadian Olympic Curling Trials
- (Canada) 2025 Canadian Mixed Doubles Curling Olympic Trials
- (Czech Republic) 2025 Czech Olympic mixed doubles curling trials
- (Japan) 2025 Japanese Olympic curling trials
- (Japan) 2025 Japanese Olympic mixed doubles curling trials
- (South Korea) 2025 Korean Curling Championships
- (South Korea) 2025 Korean Mixed Doubles Curling Championship
- 2025 United States Olympic Curling Trials
- 2025 United States Mixed Doubles Curling Olympic Trials
