= 2024 Cortina Curling Cup =

- Host city: Cortina d'Ampezzo, Italy
- Arena: Olympic Ice Stadium
- Dates: January 11–13
- Winner: (Turkey) Team Yıldız
- Curling club: Milli Piyango CA, Erzurum
- Skip: Dilşat Yıldız
- Third: Öznur Polat
- Second: İfayet Şafak Çalıkuşu
- Lead: Berfin Şengül
- Alternate: İclal Karaman
- Coach: Bilal Ömer Çakır
- Finalist: (Switzerland) Xenia Schwaller

The 2024 Cortina Curling Cup was held from January 11 to 13 at the Olympic Ice Stadium in Cortina d'Ampezzo, Italy as part of the World Curling Tour. The event was held in a round-robin format with a € 20,000 purse.

In the final, the Turkish women's team, led by Dilşat Yıldız won their first tour title, defeating Zurich's Xenia Schwaller 6–4 in the championship game. Yıldız, with Öznur Polat, İfayet Şafak Çalıkuşu, Berfin Şengül and İclal Karaman opened the scoring with two in the first and took two more in the fourth to maintain a two point lead. After Schwaller got two back in the sixth, the Turkish team scored a single in the seventh before stealing one in the eighth for the victory. Coming in as the eighth seeds, Team Yıldız finished 3–1 through the round robin to qualify for the quarterfinals, which included an upset victory over the host Stefania Constantini rink. In the playoffs, they beat Germany's Emira Abbes 9–3 in the quarters before defeating Norway's Marianne Rørvik 4–2 in the semis to qualify for the final. Team Schwaller went 4–0 through pool play and beat Korea's Gim Eun-ji 7–4 in the semifinals. In the third place game, Team Rørvik won 6–2 over Team Gim.

The inaugural event was held as a test event for the 2026 Winter Olympics, utilizing the venue that the curling competition will be played on during the Games. Because of this, it attracted many national teams, all with the hopes of qualifying for the 2026 Games.

Ten teams from eight nations made up the field for the event. Among them were Italy's own Team Stefania Constantini rink of Cortina d'Ampezzo, world number two ranked Team Gim Eun-ji of South Korea and reigning world silver medalists Team Marianne Rørvik of Norway.

== Teams ==
The teams are listed as follows:

Skip	Third	Second	Lead	Alternate	Locale
Emira Abbes (Fourth)	Mia Höhne (Skip)	Pia-Lisa Schöll (Note: Pia-Lisa Schöll spared for Lena Kapp.)	Maike Beer		Füssen, Germany
Stefania Constantini	Elena Mathis	Angela Romei	– (Note: Team Constantini played with three players.)		Cortina d'Ampezzo, Italy
Gim Eun-ji	Kim Min-ji	Kim Su-ji	Seol Ye-eun	Seol Ye-ji	Uijeongbu, South Korea
Corrie Hürlimann	Celine Schwizgebel	Sarah Müller	Marina Lörtscher		Zug, Switzerland
Erika Tuvike (Fourth) (Note: With skip Marie Kaldvee absent, the team shuffled their lineup)	Kerli Laidsalu (Skip)	Liisa Turmann	Heili Grossmann		Tallinn, Estonia
Rebecca Mariani	Camilla Gilberti	Lucrezia Grande	Rachele Scalesse		Trentino, Italy
Robyn Munro	Lisa Davie	Holly Wilkie-Milne	Laura Watt		Stirling, Scotland
Kristin Skaslien (Fourth)	Marianne Rørvik (Skip)	Mille Haslev Nordbye	Martine Rønning		Lillehammer, Norway
Xenia Schwaller	Selina Gafner	Fabienne Rieder	Selina Rychiger	Marion Wüest	Zurich, Switzerland
Dilşat Yıldız	Öznur Polat	İfayet Şafak Çalıkuşu	Berfin Şengül	İclal Karaman	Erzurum, Turkey

=== WCF ranking ===
Year to date World Curling Federation order of merit ranking for each team prior to the event.

Team	Rank	Points
(South Korea) Gim Eun-ji	2	283.5
(Italy) Stefania Constantini	8	206.8
(Switzerland) Xenia Schwaller	14	128.8
(Norway) Marianne Rørvik	24	114.4
(Switzerland) Corrie Hürlimann	39	70.6
(Scotland) Robyn Munro	50	46.8
(Estonia) Marie Kaldvee	77	24.4
(Turkey) Dilşat Yıldız	83	21.3
(Germany) Emira Abbes	87	20.4
(Italy) Rebecca Mariani	235	1.1

== Round robin standings ==
Final Round Robin Standings

Key
Teams to Playoffs

Pool A	W	L	PF	PA
(Norway) Marianne Rørvik	3	1	25	15
(South Korea) Gim Eun-ji	3	1	26	12
(Germany) Team Abbes	2	2	20	22
(Switzerland) Corrie Hürlimann	1	3	10	26
(Estonia) Team Kaldvee	1	3	20	26

Pool B	W	L	PF	PA
(Switzerland) Xenia Schwaller	4	0	28	14
(Turkey) Dilşat Yıldız	3	1	26	13
(Italy) Stefania Constantini	2	2	19	20
(Scotland) Robyn Munro	1	3	17	26
(Italy) Rebecca Mariani	0	4	12	29

== Round robin results ==
All draw times listed in Central European Time (UTC+01:00).

=== Draw 1 ===
Thursday, January 11, 10:00 am

Sheet A	1	2	3	4	5	6	7	8	9	Final
(South Korea) Gim Eun-ji	0	0	0	0	2	0	1	1	0	4
(Norway) Marianne Rørvik 🔨	0	2	0	0	0	2	0	0	1	5

Sheet B	1	2	3	4	5	6	7	8	Final
(Italy) Stefania Constantini 🔨	0	2	0	2	1	0	0	0	5
(Switzerland) Xenia Schwaller	0	0	2	0	0	2	3	0	7

Sheet C	1	2	3	4	5	6	7	8	Final
(Switzerland) Corrie Hürlimann 🔨	1	0	1	0	0	1	0	X	3
(Germany) Team Abbes	0	3	0	0	2	0	2	X	7

=== Draw 2 ===
Thursday, January 11, 2:00 pm

Sheet A	1	2	3	4	5	6	7	8	Final
(Scotland) Robyn Munro	0	0	1	0	2	0	0	X	3
(Turkey) Dilşat Yıldız 🔨	0	2	0	5	0	1	1	X	9

Sheet B	1	2	3	4	5	6	7	8	Final
(Estonia) Team Kaldvee 🔨	0	0	1	0	0	1	0	X	2
(South Korea) Gim Eun-ji	0	1	0	1	3	0	2	X	7

Sheet C	1	2	3	4	5	6	7	8	Final
(Italy) Rebecca Mariani	0	0	0	1	2	0	0	0	3
(Italy) Stefania Constantini 🔨	0	0	3	0	0	1	1	1	6

=== Draw 3 ===
Thursday, January 11, 6:00 pm

Sheet A	1	2	3	4	5	6	7	8	9	Final
(Germany) Team Abbes	0	2	1	0	1	0	2	0	1	7
(Estonia) Team Kaldvee 🔨	1	0	0	1	0	3	0	1	0	6

Sheet B	1	2	3	4	5	6	7	8	Final
(Norway) Marianne Rørvik 🔨	0	1	1	0	3	2	X	X	7
(Switzerland) Corrie Hürlimann	0	0	0	1	0	0	X	X	1

Sheet C	1	2	3	4	5	6	7	8	Final
(Switzerland) Xenia Schwaller	0	2	1	4	0	0	0	X	7
(Scotland) Robyn Munro 🔨	1	0	0	0	1	1	1	X	4

=== Draw 4 ===
Friday, January 12, 8:00 am

Sheet A	1	2	3	4	5	6	7	8	Final
(Italy) Stefania Constantini 🔨	1	0	2	0	2	0	2	X	7
(Scotland) Robyn Munro	0	0	0	2	0	1	0	X	3

Sheet B	1	2	3	4	5	6	7	8	Final
(Turkey) Dilşat Yıldız 🔨	0	0	2	2	2	0	0	1	7
(Italy) Rebecca Mariani	0	0	0	0	0	2	2	0	4

Sheet C	1	2	3	4	5	6	7	8	Final
(South Korea) Gim Eun-ji 🔨	2	0	3	1	2	X	X	X	8
(Switzerland) Corrie Hürlimann	0	1	0	0	0	X	X	X	1

=== Draw 5 ===
Friday, January 12, 12:00 pm

Sheet A	1	2	3	4	5	6	7	8	Final
(Switzerland) Xenia Schwaller 🔨	1	1	0	1	0	0	1	1	5
(Turkey) Dilşat Yıldız	0	0	0	0	0	3	0	0	3

Sheet B	1	2	3	4	5	6	7	8	Final
(Switzerland) Corrie Hürlimann 🔨	0	1	1	0	1	0	2	0	5
(Estonia) Team Kaldvee	0	0	0	1	0	1	0	2	4

Sheet C	1	2	3	4	5	6	7	8	Final
(Norway) Marianne Rørvik 🔨	1	0	1	0	2	0	2	X	6
(Germany) Team Abbes	0	0	0	1	0	1	0	X	2

=== Draw 6 ===
Friday, January 12, 4:00 pm

Sheet A	1	2	3	4	5	6	7	8	Final
(Germany) Team Abbes	0	0	2	0	2	0	0	0	4
(South Korea) Gim Eun-ji 🔨	2	0	0	0	0	3	0	2	7

Sheet B	1	2	3	4	5	6	7	8	Final
(Scotland) Robyn Munro	1	0	1	0	2	3	0	X	7
(Italy) Rebecca Mariani 🔨	0	1	0	1	0	0	1	X	3

=== Draw 7 ===
Friday, January 12, 8:00 pm

Sheet A	1	2	3	4	5	6	7	8	Final
(Italy) Rebecca Mariani	0	0	0	1	0	1	0	X	2
(Switzerland) Xenia Schwaller 🔨	3	0	1	0	1	0	4	X	9

Sheet B	1	2	3	4	5	6	7	8	Final
(Turkey) Dilşat Yıldız 🔨	2	0	1	1	1	2	X	X	7
(Italy) Stefania Constantini	0	1	0	0	0	0	X	X	1

Sheet C	1	2	3	4	5	6	7	8	9	Final
(Estonia) Team Kaldvee	1	0	2	1	0	0	2	1	1	8
(Norway) Marianne Rørvik 🔨	0	1	0	0	4	2	0	0	0	7

== Playoffs ==
Quarterfinals
B2	(Turkey) Dilşat Yıldız	9
A3	(Germany) Team Abbes	3
A2	(South Korea) Gim Eun-ji	6
B3	(Italy) Stefania Constantini	0

Semifinals
A1	(Norway) Marianne Rørvik	2
B2	(Turkey) Dilşat Yıldız	4
B1	(Switzerland) Xenia Schwaller	7
A2	(South Korea) Gim Eun-ji	4

Final
B2	(Turkey) Dilşat Yıldız	6
B1	(Switzerland) Xenia Schwaller	4
Third place game
A1	(Norway) Marianne Rørvik	6
A2	(South Korea) Gim Eun-ji	2

=== Quarterfinals ===
Saturday, January 13, 8:00 am

Sheet A	1	2	3	4	5	6	7	8	Final
(South Korea) Gim Eun-ji 🔨	0	2	0	4	X	X	X	X	6
(Italy) Stefania Constantini	0	0	0	0	X	X	X	X	0

Sheet C	1	2	3	4	5	6	7	8	Final
(Turkey) Dilşat Yıldız 🔨	0	1	0	4	0	4	X	X	9
(Germany) Team Abbes	0	0	1	0	2	0	X	X	3

=== Semifinals ===
Saturday, January 13, 11:30 am

Sheet A	1	2	3	4	5	6	7	8	Final
(Norway) Marianne Rørvik	0	0	0	0	2	0	0	X	2
(Turkey) Dilşat Yıldız 🔨	0	0	0	1	0	0	3	X	4

Sheet C	1	2	3	4	5	6	7	8	Final
(Switzerland) Xenia Schwaller	0	1	2	0	2	0	2	X	7
(South Korea) Gim Eun-ji 🔨	2	0	0	1	0	1	0	X	4

=== Third place game ===
Saturday, January 13, 3:00 pm

Sheet A	1	2	3	4	5	6	7	8	Final
(Norway) Marianne Rørvik 🔨	0	2	0	1	3	0	X	X	6
(South Korea) Gim Eun-ji	1	0	0	0	0	1	X	X	2

=== Final ===
Saturday, January 13, 3:00 pm

Sheet B	1	2	3	4	5	6	7	8	Final
(Turkey) Dilşat Yıldız 🔨	2	0	0	2	0	0	1	1	6
(Switzerland) Xenia Schwaller	0	1	1	0	0	2	0	0	4
