= Denmark at the 2026 Winter Olympics =

- Flag of Denmark
- IOC code: DEN
- NOC: National Olympic Committee and Sports Confederation of Denmark
- Website: www.dif.dk/en

in Milan and Cortina d'Ampezzo, Italy 6–22 February 2026
- Competitors: 39 (29 men and 10 women) in 7 sports
- Flag bearers (opening): Jesper Jensen Aabo & Denise Dupont
- Flag bearers (closing): Viktor Hald Thorup & Anne de Besche
- Medals Ranked 25th: Gold 0 Silver 1 Bronze 0 Total 1

Winter Olympics appearances (overview)
- 1948; 1952; 1956; 1960; 1964; 1968; 1972–1984; 1988; 1992; 1994; 1998; 2002; 2006; 2010; 2014; 2018; 2022; 2026

Denmark competed at the 2026 Winter Olympics in Milan and Cortina d'Ampezzo, Italy, from 6 to 22 February 2026.

Hockey player Jesper Jensen Aabo and curler Denise Dupont were the country's flagbearer during the opening ceremony. Meanwhile, speed skater Viktor Hald Thorup and biathlete Anne de Besche were the country's flagbearer during the closing ceremony.

Viktor Hald Thorup won Denmark's first Winter Olympics medal since 1998, first Winter Olympics medal in an individual discipline, and only second ever Winter Olympics medal in the nation's history.

== Competitors ==
The following is the list of number of competitors participating at the Games per sport/discipline.

Sport	Men	Women	Total
Alpine skiing	1	1	2
Biathlon	1	2	3
Bobsleigh	0	1	1
Curling	0	5	5
Ice hockey	25	0	25
Skeleton	1	1	2
Speed skating	1	0	1
Total	29	10	39

== Medallists ==
The following Danish competitors won medals at the games. In the discipline sections below, the medallists' names are bolded.

Medal	Name	Sport	Event	Date
Silver	Viktor Hald Thorup	Speed skating	Men's mass start	21 February

== Alpine skiing ==
Denmark qualified one male and one female alpine skier through the basic quota.

Athlete	Event	Run 1		Run 2		Total	
Athlete	Event	Time	Rank	Time	Rank	Time	Rank
Christian Borgnæs	Men's giant slalom	1:17.10	22	1:11.25	15	2:28.35	20
Clara-Marie Holmer Vorre	Women's slalom	53.03	49	58.69	43	1:51.72	42

== Biathlon ==
Based on the IBU Qualifying Points list, Denmark qualified three athletes: Ukaleq Slettemark, Sondre Slettemark and Anne de Besche. Ukaleq and Sondre Slettemark compete for Greenland (a constituent country in the Kingdom of Denmark) in the Biathlon World Cup, but as they don't have a National Olympic Committee, Greenlandic athletes compete at the Olympics for Denmark.

Athlete	Event	Time	Misses	Rank
Sondre Slettemark	Men's individual	59:44.5	3 (0+2+0+1)	62
Sondre Slettemark	Men's sprint	25:59.5	2 (1+1)	60
Sondre Slettemark	Men's pursuit	37:41.2	4 (1+0+3+0)	54
Anne de Besche	Women's individual	48:11.8	4 (0+1+1+2)	71
Anne de Besche	Women's sprint	22:07.6	1 (0+1)	16
Anne de Besche	Women's pursuit	32:31.9	2 (0+2+0+0)	20
Anne de Besche	Women's mass start	41:18.2	2 (0+0+1+1)	29
Ukaleq Astri Slettemark	Women's individual	46:30.4	1 (0+0+0+1)	52
Ukaleq Astri Slettemark	Women's sprint	24:59.0	3 (1+2)	86

== Bobsleigh ==
18 year old Maja Voigt has qualified in monobob. She is the second youngest Dane ever to qualify for the Winter Olympics.

Athlete	Event	Run 1		Run 2		Run 3		Run 4		Total	
Athlete	Event	Time	Rank	Time	Rank	Time	Rank	Time	Rank	Time	Rank
Maja Voigt	Monobob	1:00.10	8	1:00.16	8	59.70	8	59.89	12	3:59.85	9

== Curling ==
Summary

Team	Event	Group stage										Semifinal	Final / BM	
Team	Event	Opposition Score	Opposition Score	Opposition Score	Opposition Score	Opposition Score	Opposition Score	Opposition Score	Opposition Score	Opposition Score	Rank	Opposition Score	Opposition Score	Rank
Madeleine Dupont; Mathilde Halse; Jasmin Holtermann; Denise Dupont; My Larsen	Women's tournament	CAN; **L** 4–10	JPN; **W** 10–7	SWE; **L** 5–6	KOR; **W** 6–3	ITA; **W** 7–2	GBR; **L** 2–7	USA; **L** 3–10	CHN; **W** 8–7	SUI; **L** 4–6	7	Did not advance		

=== Women's tournament ===
Denmark qualified a women's team by finishing in the top seven based on the combined points at the 2024 and 2025 World Championships. Team Madeleine Dupont was selected as the Danish representatives in November 2025.

Final Round Robin Standings
Team	Skip	Pld	W	L	W–L	PF	PA	EW	EL	BE	SE	S%	DSC	Qualification
Sweden	Anna Hasselborg	9	7	2	–	65	50	45	32	5	14	81.7%	25.806	Playoffs
United States	Tabitha Peterson	9	6	3	2–0	60	54	40	37	3	13	82.1%	34.288	Playoffs
Switzerland	Silvana Tirinzoni	9	6	3	1–1	60	51	35	42	6	4	85.0%	44.338	Playoffs
Canada	Rachel Homan	9	6	3	0–2	76	59	45	38	2	9	80.3%	19.781	Playoffs
South Korea	Gim Eun-ji	9	5	4	1–0	60	53	37	35	8	11	81.2%	23.581	
Great Britain	Sophie Jackson	9	5	4	0–1	58	58	36	36	10	8	83.4%	16.938	
Denmark	Madeleine Dupont	9	4	5	–	49	58	36	38	3	11	77.0%	37.875	
Japan	Sayaka Yoshimura	9	2	7	1–1	51	69	35	43	3	6	78.6%	27.513	
Italy	Stefania Constantini	9	2	7	1–1	47	60	34	40	3	4	78.8%	34.719	
China	Wang Rui	9	2	7	1–1	56	70	37	39	3	9	82.7%	41.206	

Source: Official website

Round robin
Denmark had a bye in draws 4, 8 and 12.

Draw 1
Thursday, 12 February, 9:05

Sheet D	1	2	3	4	5	6	7	8	9	10	Final
**Canada (Homan) 🔨**	2	0	0	1	4	0	3	X	X	X	**10**
Denmark (Dupont)	0	2	1	0	0	1	0	X	X	X	**4**

Draw 2
Thursday, 12 February, 19:05

Sheet C	1	2	3	4	5	6	7	8	9	10	11	Final
**Denmark (Dupont) 🔨**	0	2	1	1	0	2	0	0	1	0	3	**10**
Japan (Yoshimura)	1	0	0	0	2	0	2	1	0	1	0	**7**

Draw 3
Friday, 13 February, 14:05

Sheet A	1	2	3	4	5	6	7	8	9	10	Final
Denmark (Dupont)	0	2	0	0	1	0	1	0	1	0	**5**
**Sweden (Hasselborg) 🔨**	0	0	1	2	0	1	0	1	0	1	**6**

Draw 5
Saturday, 14 February, 19:05

Sheet C	1	2	3	4	5	6	7	8	9	10	Final
South Korea (Gim) 🔨	0	0	1	0	1	0	0	1	0	0	**3**
**Denmark (Dupont)**	0	1	0	1	0	1	1	0	1	1	**6**

Draw 6
Sunday, 15 February, 14:05

Sheet B	1	2	3	4	5	6	7	8	9	10	Final
**Denmark (Dupont) 🔨**	0	2	0	1	1	2	1	0	X	X	**7**
Italy (Constantini)	0	0	1	0	0	0	0	1	X	X	**2**

Draw 7
Monday, 16 February, 9:05

Sheet D	1	2	3	4	5	6	7	8	9	10	Final
Denmark (Dupont)	0	1	0	0	1	0	0	0	X	X	**2**
**Great Britain (Jackson) 🔨**	2	0	0	1	0	2	1	1	X	X	**7**

Draw 9
Tuesday, 17 February, 14:05

Sheet C	1	2	3	4	5	6	7	8	9	10	Final
Denmark (Dupont)	0	1	0	1	0	0	1	0	X	X	**3**
**United States (Peterson) 🔨**	1	0	2	0	1	2	0	4	X	X	**10**

Draw 10
Wednesday, 18 February, 9:05

Sheet A	1	2	3	4	5	6	7	8	9	10	Final
China (Wang)	0	1	0	1	1	2	1	0	1	0	**7**
**Denmark (Dupont) 🔨**	2	0	4	0	0	0	0	1	0	1	**8**

Draw 11
Wednesday, 18 February, 19:05

Sheet B	1	2	3	4	5	6	7	8	9	10	Final
**Switzerland (Tirinzoni) 🔨**	0	2	0	0	0	0	0	1	0	3	**6**
Denmark (Dupont)	0	0	0	0	2	1	0	0	1	0	**4**

== Ice hockey ==
Summary

Key:

- OT – Overtime
- GWS – Match decided by penalty-shootout

Team	Event	Group stage				Qualification playoff	Quarterfinal	Semifinal	Final / BM	
Team	Event	Opposition Score	Opposition Score	Opposition Score	Rank	Opposition Score	Opposition Score	Opposition Score	Opposition Score	Rank
Denmark men's	Men's tournament	Germany; **L** 3–1	United States; **L** 6–3	Latvia; **W** 4–2	3 **Q**	Czech Republic; **L** 2–3	Did not advance			9

=== Men's tournament ===
Denmark men's national ice hockey team qualified a team of 25 players by winning a final qualification tournament.

Roster

The first six players of Denmark's roster were announced on 16 June 2025. The remaining roster was named on 7 January 2026. On 8 February, Jonas Røndbjerg was ruled out due to injury, and replaced by Malte Setkov. Jesper Jensen Aabo served as Denmark's captain, with Oliver Lauridsen and Patrick Russell as alternate captains.

Head coach: (Sweden) Mikael Gath

No.	Pos.	Name	Height	Weight	Birthdate	Team
3	D	Malte Setkov	2.03 m (6 ft 8 in)	101 kg (223 lb)	14 January 1999 (aged 27)	(Denmark) Rødovre Mighty Bulls
9	F	Frederik Storm	1.80 m (5 ft 11 in)	86 kg (190 lb)	20 February 1989 (aged 36)	(Germany) Kölner Haie
11	F	Alexander True	1.96 m (6 ft 5 in)	91 kg (201 lb)	17 July 1997 (aged 28)	(Finland) JYP
12	F	Oscar Mølgaard	1.83 m (6 ft 0 in)	80 kg (176 lb)	18 February 2005 (aged 20)	(United States) Coachella Valley Firebirds
15	D	Matias Lassen	1.83 m (6 ft 0 in)	88 kg (194 lb)	15 March 1996 (aged 29)	(Germany) Iserlohn Roosters
17	F	Nicklas Jensen	1.91 m (6 ft 3 in)	98 kg (216 lb)	6 March 1993 (aged 32)	(Switzerland) SC Rapperswil-Jona Lakers
20	F	Lars Eller	1.85 m (6 ft 1 in)	90 kg (198 lb)	8 May 1989 (aged 36)	(Canada) Ottawa Senators
22	D	Markus Lauridsen	1.85 m (6 ft 1 in)	90 kg (198 lb)	28 February 1991 (aged 34)	(Italy) HC Pustertal Wölfe
24	F	Nikolaj Ehlers	1.85 m (6 ft 1 in)	82 kg (181 lb)	14 February 1996 (aged 29)	(United States) Carolina Hurricanes
25	D	Oliver Lauridsen – **A**	1.98 m (6 ft 6 in)	105 kg (231 lb)	24 March 1989 (aged 36)	(Finland) TPS
27	F	Oliver Bjorkstrand	1.83 m (6 ft 0 in)	79 kg (174 lb)	10 April 1995 (aged 30)	(United States) Tampa Bay Lightning
29	F	Mikkel Aagaard	1.83 m (6 ft 0 in)	86 kg (190 lb)	18 October 1995 (aged 30)	(Sweden) Skellefteå AIK
30	G	Mads Søgaard	2.01 m (6 ft 7 in)	91 kg (201 lb)	13 December 2000 (aged 25)	(Canada) Belleville Senators
31	G	Frederik Andersen	1.93 m (6 ft 4 in)	100 kg (220 lb)	2 October 1989 (aged 36)	(United States) Carolina Hurricanes
38	F	Morten Poulsen	1.85 m (6 ft 1 in)	101 kg (223 lb)	9 September 1988 (aged 37)	(Denmark) Herning Blue Fox
40	D	Anders Koch	1.91 m (6 ft 3 in)	86 kg (190 lb)	2 October 1997 (aged 28)	(Austria) Graz99ers
41	D	Jesper Jensen Aabo – **C**	1.83 m (6 ft 0 in)	87 kg (192 lb)	30 July 1991 (aged 34)	(Austria) EC KAC
42	D	Phillip Bruggisser	1.83 m (6 ft 0 in)	91 kg (201 lb)	7 August 1991 (aged 34)	(Germany) Fischtown Pinguins
48	D	Nicholas B. Jensen	1.88 m (6 ft 2 in)	102 kg (225 lb)	8 April 1989 (aged 36)	(Germany) Fischtown Pinguins
50	F	Mathias Bau	2.01 m (6 ft 7 in)	108 kg (238 lb)	3 July 1993 (aged 32)	(Denmark) Herning Blue Fox
63	F	Patrick Russell – **A**	1.85 m (6 ft 1 in)	92 kg (203 lb)	4 January 1993 (aged 33)	(Germany) Kölner Haie
65	F	Christian Wejse	1.85 m (6 ft 1 in)	88 kg (194 lb)	4 December 1998 (aged 27)	(Germany) Fischtown Pinguins
80	G	Frederik Dichow	1.96 m (6 ft 5 in)	94 kg (207 lb)	1 March 2001 (aged 24)	(Sweden) HV71
86	F	Joachim Blichfeld	1.88 m (6 ft 2 in)	92 kg (203 lb)	17 July 1998 (aged 27)	(Finland) Tappara
95	F	Nick Olesen	1.85 m (6 ft 1 in)	84 kg (185 lb)	14 November 1995 (aged 30)	(Czech Republic) Motor České Budějovice

Group play

Pos	Team	Pld	W	OTW	OTL	L	GF	GA	GD	Pts	Qualification
1	United States	3	3	0	0	0	16	5	+11	**9**	Advance to quarterfinals
2	Germany	3	1	0	0	2	7	10	−3	**3 (Note: Head-to-head points: 3 each. Head-to-head goal difference: Germany +1; Denmark 0; Latvia −1.)**	Advance to qualification playoffs
3	Denmark	3	1	0	0	2	8	11	−3	**3**	Advance to qualification playoffs
4	Latvia	3	1	0	0	2	7	12	−5	**3**	Advance to qualification playoffs

Source: IIHF
Rules for classification: Tiebreak criteria
Notes:

12 February 2026; 21:10	**Germany**	**3–1** (1–1, 2–0, 0–0)	Denmark	Fiera Milano, Milan; Attendance: 3,986

Game reference

Philipp Grubauer
Goalies
Frederik Andersen
Referees:
(Latvia) Andris Ansons
(Sweden) Christopher Holm
Linesmen:
(Czech Republic) Daniel Hynek
(Canada) Matt MacPherson

Draisaitl (Tiffels, Wagner) – 00:23	1–0
	1–1	13:09 – Mølgaard (Ehlers, Jensen Aabo)
Stützle (Peterka, Stachowiak) – 24:20	2–1
Stutzle (Draisaitl, Seider) (PP) – 30:02	3–1

0 min
Penalties
4 min
26
Shots
38

14 February 2026; 21:10	**United States**	**6–3** (1–2, 3–1, 2–0)	Denmark	PalaItalia, Milan; Attendance: 11,480

Game reference

Jeremy Swayman
Goalies
Mads Søgaard
Frederik Dichow
Referees:
(Sweden) Michael Holm
(Canada) Dan O'Rourke
Linesmen:
(United States) Ryan Daisy
(Canada) Tarrington Wyonzek

	0–1	01:40 – Olesen (Mølgaard, Aagaard)
Boldy (Q. Hughes, Slavin) – 03:35	1–1
	1–2	11:16 – Jensen (Setkov)
B. Tkachuk (Eichel) – 29:26	2–2
Eichel (M. Tkachuk) – 30:23	3–2
Hanifin (Trocheck, Faber) – 37:23	4–2
	4–3	39:57 – Bruggisser (Ehlers, True)
Guentzel (Matthews) – 47:24	5–3
J. Hughes (Nelson) – 54:27	6–3

6 min
Penalties
4 min
47
Shots
21

15 February 2026; 19:10	**Denmark**	**4–2** (3–1, 0–1, 1–0)	Latvia	Fiera Milano, Milan; Attendance: 3,983

Game reference

Frederik Andersen
Goalies
Artūrs Šilovs
Referees:
(Canada) Eric Furlatt
(Germany) André Schrader
Linesmen:
(Canada) David Brisebois
(United States) Jake Davis

Olesen (Aagaard) – 00:23	1–0
Aagaard (Olesen, Wejse) (PP) – 04:54	2–0
Ehlers (Bjorkstrand, Lauridsen) – 16:28	3–0
	3–1	19:44 – Zīle (Jaks, Tralmaks) (EA)
	3–2	26:47 – Tralmaks (Zīle, Girgensons)
Olesen (Lauridsen, Eller) (EN) – 57:38	4–2

10 min
Penalties
10 min
21
Shots
35

Qualification play-offs

17 February 2026; 16:40	**Czechia**	**3–2** (0–0, 3–2, 0–0)	Denmark	PalaItalia, Milan; Attendance: 10,364

Game reference

Lukáš Dostál
Goalies
Frederik Andersen
Referees:
(Canada) Dan O'Rourke
(United States) Kyle Rehman
Linesmen:
(United States) Nick Briganti
(United States) Jake Davis

Nečas (Hronek, Červenka) (PP) – 25:39	1–0
	1–1	29:02 – True (Blichfeld)
Kämpf (Rutta, Nečas) – 30:15	2–1
Červenka (Pastrňák) – 31:24	3–1
	3–2	37:12 – Olesen (Mølgaard, Blichfeld) (PP)

8 min
Penalties
4 min
31
Shots
26

== Skeleton ==
Athlete	Event	Run 1		Run 2		Run 3		Run 4		Total	
Athlete	Event	Time	Rank	Time	Rank	Time	Rank	Time	Rank	Time	Rank
Rasmus Johansen	Men's	56.82	11	56.52	7	56.52	11	56.45	10	3:46.31	11
Nanna Johansen	Women's	58.27	18	58.37	20	58.97	22	58.63	21	3:54.24	20
Rasmus Johansen; Nanna Johansen	Mixed team	1:02.15	14	59.43	10	—N/a				2:01.58	12

== Speed skating ==
Denmark qualified one male speed skater through performances at the 2025-26 ISU Speed Skating World Cup.

Distance

Athlete	Event	Final	
Athlete	Event	Time	Rank
Viktor Hald Thorup	Men's 10000m	DNF	

Mass start

Athlete	Event	Semifinal			Final		
Athlete	Event	Points	Time	Rank	Points	Time	Rank
**Viktor Hald Thorup**	Men's	3	8:01.77	8 **Q**	47	8:00.52	2nd place, silver medalist(s)

== See also ==
- Denmark at the 2026 Winter Paralympics
