= 2025 Czech Olympic mixed doubles curling trials =

2025 Czech mixed doubles curling Olympic trials
- Host city: Prague, Czech Republic
- Arena: Curling Arena Prague
- Dates: September 26–28
- Winner: (Prague) Zelingrová / Chabičovský
- Female: Julie Zelingrová
- Male: Vít Chabičovský
- Coach: Vladimír Černovský
- Finalist: (Prague) Paulová / Paul

The 2025 Czech mixed doubles curling Olympic trials were held from September 26 to 28 at the Curling Arena Prague in Prague, Czech Republic. The winning pair of Julie Zelingrová and Vít Chabičovský earned the right to represent Czechia at the Olympic Qualification Event where they won the event and qualified for the 2026 Winter Olympics in Cortina d'Ampezzo, Italy.

Two teams met the qualification standard of representing the Czech Republic at the World Mixed Doubles Curling Championship. 2022 Olympians Zuzana Paulová and Tomáš Paul won the national title in 2024 and went on to a 4–6 finish at the 2024 World Mixed Doubles Curling Championship. The young team of Julie Zelingrová and Vít Chabičovský, meanwhile, represented the country in 2022, 2023 and 2025 and finished 3–6 at each appearance. The event was held in a best-of-five series.

Team Zelingrová / Chabičovský won the event 3–1, taking the first, second and fourth games. This qualified them for the Olympic Qualification Event in Kelowna, British Columbia, Canada, where despite Czechia being ranked fifth prior to the event, they finished first through pool play with a 6–1 record, giving them two chances at qualifying for the Olympics. In the first qualification final, they defeated the world number one ranked team of Tahli Gill and Dean Hewitt of Australia 6–5 to earn a spot in the 2026 Winter Olympics.

== Teams ==
The teams are listed as follows:

Female	Male	Locale
Zuzana Paulová	Tomáš Paul	Prague
Julie Zelingrová	Vít Chabičovský	Prague

== Standings ==
Best-of-five
(Prague) Paulová / Paul	7	5	9	5	X
(Prague) Zelingrová / Chabičovský	9	6	5	6	X

== Results ==
All draw times are listed in Central European Time (UTC+01:00).

=== Game 1 ===
Friday, September 26, 5:40 pm

Sheet 2	1	2	3	4	5	6	7	8	9	Final
(Prague) Paulová / Paul	0	2	0	2	0	1	0	2	0	7
(Prague) Zelingrová / Chabičovský	1	0	1	0	2	0	3	0	2	9

=== Game 2 ===
Saturday, September 27, 11:10 am

Sheet 1	1	2	3	4	5	6	7	8	Final
(Prague) Zelingrová / Chabičovský	1	1	1	0	0	3	0	0	6
(Prague) Paulová / Paul	0	0	0	1	1	0	2	1	5

=== Game 3 ===
Saturday, September 27, 5:40 pm

Sheet 2	1	2	3	4	5	6	7	8	Final
(Prague) Paulová / Paul	1	0	2	2	2	0	2	X	9
(Prague) Zelingrová / Chabičovský	0	3	0	0	0	2	0	X	5

=== Game 4 ===
Sunday, September 28, 11:10 am

Sheet 4	1	2	3	4	5	6	7	8	9	Final
(Prague) Zelingrová / Chabičovský	1	1	0	0	0	1	0	2	1	6
(Prague) Paulová / Paul	0	0	2	1	1	0	1	0	0	5
