= Biathlon at the 2026 Winter Olympics – Men's mass start =

Men's mass start at the XXV Olympic Winter Games
- Biathlon
- Venue: Anterselva Biathlon Arena
- Date: 20 February 2026
- Competitors: 30 from 11 nations
- Winning time: 39:17.1

Medalists
| 1st place, gold medalist(s) | | Johannes Dale-Skjevdal | Norway |
| 2nd place, silver medalist(s) | | Sturla Holm Lægreid | Norway |
| 3rd place, bronze medalist(s) | | Quentin Fillon Maillet | France |

The men's mass start competition of the 2026 Winter Olympics was held on 20 February, at the Anterselva Biathlon Arena in Rasen-Antholz. Johannes Dale-Skjevdal of Norway won the event, thus getting his first Olympic medal. His teammate Sturla Holm Lægreid won the silver medal, and Quentin Fillon Maillet of France bronze. Holm Lægreid thereby won a medal in all five men's biathlon events at the 2026 Winter Olympics, none of them gold though.

== Background ==
The defending champion, Johannes Thingnes Bø, retired from competitions. The silver medalist, Martin Ponsiluoma, qualified for the Olympics, as did the bronze medalist, Vetle Sjåstad Christiansen. Prior to the Olympics, Éric Perrot was leading the total as well as mass start standings of the 2025–26 Biathlon World Cup. Endre Strømsheim was the 2025 World champion.

== Race description ==
The whole pack got off the line well, with Quentin Fillon Maillet arriving at the shooting range for shooting 1 first. Fellow Frenchman Émilien Jacquelin shot extremely quickly, hitting all five targets. This meant a small gap of 5 seconds to Otto Invenius and Vetle Sjåstad Christiansen, who were leading the group of athletes who also went through shooting 1 without a mistake. Jacquelin extended his lead to 20 seconds going in to shooting 2, with Invenius dropping back. Behind Jacquelin a group of 4 athletes formed, including Christiansen, Sturla Holm Lægreid, Johannes Dale-Skjevdal and Tommaso Giacomel.

Jacquelin made one mistake in his second shooting session, with the group of four all making no mistakes. After his penalty lap, Jacquelin entered the group going up to the third shooting session. Midway through the cross-country section, Giacomel suddenly dropped back, retiring from the race.

Shooting 3 started with Fillon Maillet having caught up to the group of four, thus again consisting of five athletes. The wind had picked up speed, which caused many athletes to miss multiple shots in this shooting round. Jacquelin made 4 mistakes in shooting 3, which ruled him out for the medal places. Lægreid missed one target, with Christiansen and Fillon Maillet missing two. Dale-Skjevdal remained without mistake and led the field out of shooting 3. The Norwegian was followed by Philipp Horn, who had not made any mistake up until that point, but had dropped behind due to slower cross-country sections.

Horn was caught by Lægreid before the shooting stadium and entered third, behind both Norwegians. Dale-Skjevdal remained without mistake in shooting 4, making him the first flawless athlete in this discipline since Emil Hegle Svendsen and Ondřej Moravec, gold and bronze medalists at the 2014 Olympics. Lægreid was also flawless through shooting 4, but had to settle for silver, following 20 seconds behind his fellow countrymen Dale-Skjevdal. Horn and Fillon Maillet both made one mistake, which set up an exciting battle for bronze.

Horn led Fillon Maillet by 5 seconds coming out of the shooting stadium, but the Frenchman caught up to the German very quickly, passing him on the hill leading up to the 13.8 km mark. Horn was not able to follow the pace of Fillon Maillet, which meant the bronze medal went to France. Dale-Skjevdal received a standing ovation from the crowd in the stadium section, finishing 10.5 seconds ahead of Lægreid and 25.6 seconds ahead of Fillon Maillet.

Éric Perrot, who was leading the total as well as mass start standings of the 2025–26 Biathlon World Cup prior to the Olympics, and Martin Ponsiluoma, silver medalist in Beijing, both had a disappointing race. Finishing in 20th and 21st respectively, the gap to Dale-Skjevdal was almost 4 minutes.

== Results ==
The race was started at 14:15.

| Rank | Bib | Name | Country | Time | Penalties (P+P+S+S) | Deficit |
|---|---|---|---|---|---|---|
| 1st place, gold medalist(s) | 10 | Johannes Dale-Skjevdal | Norway | 39:17.1 | 0 (0+0+0+0) | — |
| 2nd place, silver medalist(s) | 6 | Sturla Holm Lægreid | Norway | 39:27.6 | 1 (0+0+1+0) | +10.5 |
| 3rd place, bronze medalist(s) | 2 | Quentin Fillon Maillet | France | 39:42.7 | 4 (1+0+2+1) | +25.6 |
| 4 | 16 | Philipp Horn | Germany | 39:52.6 | 1 (0+0+0+1) | +35.5 |
| 5 | 5 | Vetle Sjåstad Christiansen | Norway | 41:05.2 | 3 (0+0+2+1) | +1:48.1 |
| 6 | 27 | Michal Krčmář | Czech Republic | 41:20.7 | 5 (0+0+1+4) | +2:03.6 |
| 7 | 12 | Philipp Nawrath | Germany | 41:22.4 | 5 (0+1+1+3) | +2:05.3 |
| 8 | 1 | Johan-Olav Botn | Norway | 41:24.5 | 5 (1+2+0+2) | +2:07.4 |
| 9 | 21 | Otto Invenius | Finland | 41:41.8 | 5 (0+0+3+2) | +2:24.7 |
| 10 | 20 | Vitalii Mandzyn | Ukraine | 41:47.8 | 5 (0+0+2+3) | +2:30.7 |
| 11 | 26 | Joscha Burkhalter | Switzerland | 41:49.1 | 2 (1+0+1+0) | +2:32.0 |
| 12 | 7 | Émilien Jacquelin | France | 41:56.7 | 6 (0+1+4+1) | +2:39.6 |
| 13 | 24 | Sebastian Stalder | Switzerland | 42:07.0 | 1 (0+0+1+0) | +2:49.9 |
| 14 | 14 | Olli Hiidensalo | Finland | 42:09.0 | 4 (0+1+2+1) | +2:51.9 |
| 15 | 15 | Tuomas Harjula | Finland | 42:16.0 | 3 (0+0+2+1) | +2:58.9 |
| 16 | 19 | Jakov Fak | Slovenia | 42:23.2 | 1 (0+0+1+0) | +3:06.1 |
| 17 | 17 | Dmytro Pidruchnyi | Ukraine | 42:31.7 | 5 (2+0+2+1) | +3:14.6 |
| 18 | 9 | Sebastian Samuelsson | Sweden | 42:52.1 | 4 (0+2+1+1) | +3:35.0 |
| 19 | 18 | Vítězslav Hornig | Czech Republic | 42:56.0 | 5 (2+0+1+2) | +3:38.9 |
| 20 | 4 | Éric Perrot | France | 43:01.5 | 7 (1+2+3+1) | +3:44.4 |
| 21 | 3 | Martin Ponsiluoma | Sweden | 43:03.8 | 7 (2+3+1+1) | +3:46.7 |
| 22 | 22 | Tero Seppälä | Finland | 43:10.1 | 7 (0+3+2+2) | +3:53.0 |
| 23 | 23 | David Zobel | Germany | 43:49.5 | 7 (0+2+4+1) | +4:32.4 |
| 24 | 29 | Niklas Hartweg | Switzerland | 44:07.5 | 6 (1+1+3+1) | +4:50.4 |
| 25 | 13 | Lukas Hofer | Italy | 44:09.5 | 8 (1+1+4+2) | +4:52.4 |
| 26 | 30 | Jesper Nelin | Sweden | 44:17.3 | 7 (0+1+3+3) | +5:00.2 |
| 27 | 25 | Fabien Claude | France | 45:13.7 | 9 (3+1+4+1) | +5:56.6 |
| 28 | 28 | Nicola Romanin | Italy | 45:14.0 | 8 (2+2+2+2) | +5:56.9 |
| 29 | 11 | Campbell Wright | United States | 45:14.0 | 7 (0+1+5+1) | +5:56.9 |
| | 8 | Tommaso Giacomel | Italy | DNF | (0+0+ + ) | |
