= 2025 Japanese Olympic mixed doubles curling trials =

2025 Japanese mixed doubles curling Olympic trials
- Host city: Wakkanai, Japan
- Arena: Wakkanai City Midori Sports Park
- Dates: September 25–28
- Winner: (Yamanashi Prefecture) (Hokkaido) Koana / Aoki
- Female: Tori Koana
- Male: Go Aoki
- Coach: Yoshinori Aoki
- Finalist: (Nagano Prefecture) (Hokkaido) Matsumura / Tanida

The 2025 Japanese mixed doubles curling Olympic trials were held from September 25 to 28 at the Wakkanai City Midori Sports Park in Wakkanai, Japan. The winning team earned the right to represent Japan at the Olympic Qualification Event where they will need to finish in the top two to qualify for the 2026 Winter Olympics in Cortina d'Ampezzo, Italy.

The event was held in a double round robin format with the top two teams advancing to a best-of-five series which includes the results from their first two games. The 2024 (Miyu Ueno & Tsuyoshi Yamaguchi) and 2025 (Chiaki Matsumura & Yasumasa Tanida) Japanese champions qualified by winning the previous two national titles while points leaders and world number six ranked Tori Koana & Go Aoki will also participate. By finishing ninth and thirteenth respectively at the 2024 and 2025 World Mixed Doubles Curling Championship, Japan earned twenty Olympic qualification points, not enough to qualify the nation directly for the Games.

== Teams ==
The teams are listed as follows:

Female	Male	Locale
Tori Koana	Go Aoki	(Yamanashi Prefecture) Kōfu / (Hokkaido) Sapporo
Chiaki Matsumura	Yasumasa Tanida	(Nagano Prefecture) Nagano / (Hokkaido) Sapporo
Miyu Ueno	Tsuyoshi Yamaguchi	(Nagano Prefecture) Karuizawa

== Round robin standings ==
Final Round Robin Standings

Key
Teams to Best-of-five

Team	W	L	W–L	PF	PA	EW	EL	BE	SE
(Yamanashi Prefecture) (Hokkaido) Koana / Aoki	4	0	–	33	19	18	13	0	4
(Nagano Prefecture) (Hokkaido) Matsumura / Tanida	2	2	–	24	29	15	16	0	4
(Nagano Prefecture) Ueno / Yamaguchi	0	4	–	20	29	14	18	0	3

Round Robin Summary Table
Pos.	Team	(Yamanashi Prefecture) (Hokkaido) K / A		(Nagano Prefecture) (Hokkaido) M / T		(Nagano Prefecture) U / Y		Record
Pos.	Team	1st	2nd	1st	2nd	1st	2nd	Record
1	(Yamanashi Prefecture) (Hokkaido) Koana / Aoki	—N/a		10–4	8–6	8–3	7–6	4–0
2	(Nagano Prefecture) (Hokkaido) Matsumura / Tanida	4–10	6–8	—N/a		6–5	8–6	2–2
3	(Nagano Prefecture) Ueno / Yamaguchi	3–8	6–7	5–6	6–8	—N/a		0–4

== Round robin results ==
All draw times are listed in Japan Standard Time (UTC+09:00).

=== Draw 1 ===
Thursday, September 25, 8:00 am

Sheet C	1	2	3	4	5	6	7	8	Final
(Nagano Prefecture) (Hokkaido) Matsumura / Tanida	0	1	1	1	0	1	1	1	6
(Nagano Prefecture) Ueno / Yamaguchi	2	0	0	0	3	0	0	0	5

=== Draw 2 ===
Thursday, September 25, 12:00 pm

Sheet C	1	2	3	4	5	6	7	8	Final
(Nagano Prefecture) Ueno / Yamaguchi	1	0	1	0	1	0	0	0	3
(Yamanashi Prefecture) (Hokkaido) Koana / Aoki	0	2	0	1	0	1	1	3	8

=== Draw 3 ===
Thursday, September 25, 4:00 pm

Sheet C	1	2	3	4	5	6	7	8	Final
(Yamanashi Prefecture) (Hokkaido) Koana / Aoki	3	0	4	0	2	0	1	X	10
(Nagano Prefecture) (Hokkaido) Matsumura / Tanida	0	1	0	2	0	1	0	X	4

=== Draw 4 ===
Friday, September 26, 8:00 am

Sheet C	1	2	3	4	5	6	7	8	Final
(Yamanashi Prefecture) (Hokkaido) Koana / Aoki	1	0	2	0	0	2	0	2	7
(Nagano Prefecture) Ueno / Yamaguchi	0	2	0	1	1	0	2	0	6

=== Draw 5 ===
Friday, September 26, 12:00 pm

Sheet C	1	2	3	4	5	6	7	8	Final
(Nagano Prefecture) Ueno / Yamaguchi	1	0	1	1	0	2	0	1	6
(Nagano Prefecture) (Hokkaido) Matsumura / Tanida	0	4	0	0	1	0	3	0	8

=== Draw 6 ===
Friday, September 26, 4:00 pm

Sheet C	1	2	3	4	5	6	7	8	Final
(Nagano Prefecture) (Hokkaido) Matsumura / Tanida	0	1	0	2	0	3	0	0	6
(Yamanashi Prefecture) (Hokkaido) Koana / Aoki	1	0	2	0	3	0	1	1	8

== Best-of-five ==
The teams' head-to-head games in rounds one and two were counted towards their best-of-five score.

Best-of-five
(Yamanashi Prefecture) (Hokkaido) Koana / Aoki	10	8	5	7	X
(Nagano Prefecture) (Hokkaido) Matsumura / Tanida	4	6	7	6	X

=== Game 3 ===
Saturday, September 27, 3:00 pm

Sheet C	1	2	3	4	5	6	7	8	Final
(Yamanashi Prefecture) (Hokkaido) Koana / Aoki	0	1	0	2	0	2	0	0	5
(Nagano Prefecture) (Hokkaido) Matsumura / Tanida	1	0	1	0	1	0	1	3	7

=== Game 4 ===
Sunday, September 28, 9:00 am

Sheet C	1	2	3	4	5	6	7	8	Final
(Yamanashi Prefecture) (Hokkaido) Koana / Aoki	0	3	0	1	0	2	0	1	7
(Nagano Prefecture) (Hokkaido) Matsumura / Tanida	2	0	1	0	1	0	2	0	6

== See also ==
- 2025 Japanese Olympic curling trials
