= 2025 Japanese Olympic curling trials =

- Host city: Wakkanai, Japan
- Arena: Wakkanai City Midori Sports Park
- Dates: September 11–14
- Men's winner: (Nagano Prefecture) SC Karuizawa Club
- Curling club: Karuizawa CC, Karuizawa, Nagano
- Skip: Tsuyoshi Yamaguchi
- Fourth: Riku Yanagisawa
- Second: Takeru Yamamoto
- Lead: Satoshi Koizumi
- Alternate: Shingo Usui
- Coach: Yuji Nishimuro
- Finalist: (Hokkaido) Consadole (Abe)
- Women's winner: (Hokkaido) Fortius
- Curling club: Sapporo CC, Sapporo, Hokkaido
- Skip: Sayaka Yoshimura
- Third: Kaho Onodera
- Second: Yuna Kotani
- Lead: Anna Ohmiya
- Alternate: Mina Kobayashi
- Coach: Yumie Funayama & Niklas Edin
- Finalist: (Nagano Prefecture) SC Karuizawa Club

The 2025 Japanese Olympic curling trials were held from September 11 to 14 at the Wakkanai City Midori Sports Park in Wakkanai, Japan. The winning Tsuyoshi Yamaguchi and Sayaka Yoshimura rinks earned the right to represent Japan at the Olympic Qualification Event where they will need to finish in the top two to qualify for the 2026 Winter Olympics in Cortina d'Ampezzo, Italy. It was the first time a men's trial is being held.

The men's event featured a best-of-five series between the 2024 and 2025 Japanese champion rinks of Shinya Abe (Consadole) and Tsuyoshi Yamaguchi (SC Karuizawa Club). In 2024, Consadole led Japan to a 3–9 record at the 2024 World Men's Curling Championship, only earning three qualification points for the nation. SC Karuizawa Club did slightly better in 2025 by finishing ninth and earning five points, though it was not enough to advance Japan directly to the Olympic Games.

The women's event was held in a double round robin format with the top two teams advancing to a best-of-five series which includes the results from their first two games. The 2024 and 2025 Japanese champions Miyu Ueno (SC Karuizawa Club) and Sayaka Yoshimura (Fortius) qualified by winning the previous two national titles while two-time Olympic medallist Satsuki Fujisawa (Loco Solare) qualified as the points leader. Like the men's teams, SC Karuizawa Club finished eleventh in 2024 while Fortius placed ninth in 2025, resulting in just eight qualification points.

== Men ==
=== Teams ===
The teams are listed as follows:

Team	Skip	Third	Second	Lead	Alternate	Locale
Consadole	Tetsuro Shimizu (Fourth)	Shinya Abe (Skip)	Hayato Sato	Haruto Ouchi	Sota Tsuruga	(Hokkaido) Kitami
SC Karuizawa Club	Riku Yanagisawa (Fourth)	Tsuyoshi Yamaguchi (Skip)	Takeru Yamamoto	Satoshi Koizumi	Shingo Usui	(Nagano Prefecture) Karuizawa

=== Standings ===
Best-of-five
(Hokkaido) Consadole	6	3	7	4	X
(Nagano Prefecture) SC Karuizawa Club	7	9	6	5	X

=== Results ===
All draw times are listed in Japan Standard Time (UTC+09:00).

==== Game 1 ====
Thursday, September 11, 8:00 am

Sheet C	1	2	3	4	5	6	7	8	9	10	Final
(Hokkaido) Consadole (Abe)	1	0	0	2	0	1	0	0	2	0	6
(Nagano Prefecture) SC Karuizawa Club (Yamaguchi)	0	2	0	0	2	0	1	1	0	1	7

==== Game 2 ====
Thursday, September 11, 1:00 pm

Sheet C	1	2	3	4	5	6	7	8	9	10	Final
(Nagano Prefecture) SC Karuizawa Club (Yamaguchi)	0	1	3	0	3	1	0	1	X	X	9
(Hokkaido) Consadole (Abe)	0	0	0	2	0	0	1	0	X	X	3

==== Game 3 ====
Friday, September 12, 8:00 am

Sheet C	1	2	3	4	5	6	7	8	9	10	Final
(Nagano Prefecture) SC Karuizawa Club (Yamaguchi)	1	1	0	0	0	0	2	0	2	0	6
(Hokkaido) Consadole (Abe)	0	0	0	2	1	0	0	1	0	3	7

==== Game 4 ====
Friday, September 12, 1:00 pm

Sheet C	1	2	3	4	5	6	7	8	9	10	Final
(Hokkaido) Consadole (Abe)	0	0	0	2	0	0	0	1	1	0	4
(Nagano Prefecture) SC Karuizawa Club (Yamaguchi)	0	1	0	0	2	0	0	0	0	2	5

== Women ==
=== Teams ===
The teams are listed as follows:

Team	Skip	Third	Second	Lead	Alternate	Locale
Fortius	Sayaka Yoshimura	Kaho Onodera	Yuna Kotani	Anna Ohmiya	Mina Kobayashi	(Hokkaido) Sapporo
Loco Solare	Satsuki Fujisawa	Chinami Yoshida	Yumi Suzuki	Yurika Yoshida		(Hokkaido) Kitami
SC Karuizawa Club	Miyu Ueno	Yui Ueno	Yuina Miura (Note: Yuina Miura spared for Junko Nishimuro.)	Asuka Kanai	Junko Nishimuro	(Nagano Prefecture) Karuizawa

=== Round robin standings ===
Final Round Robin Standings

Key
Team to Best-of-five
Teams to Tiebreaker

Team	Skip	W	L	PF	PA	EW	EL	BE	SE	DSC
(Nagano Prefecture) SC Karuizawa Club	Miyu Ueno	2	2	20	28	14	18	3	3	23.49
(Hokkaido) Fortius	Sayaka Yoshimura	2	2	25	26	19	16	2	7	32.06
(Hokkaido) Loco Solare	Satsuki Fujisawa	2	2	32	23	17	16	5	6	45.31

Round Robin Summary Table
Pos.	Team	(Hokkaido) F		(Hokkaido) LS		(Nagano Prefecture) SC		Record
Pos.	Team	1st	2nd	1st	2nd	1st	2nd	Record
2	(Hokkaido) Fortius	—N/a		7–9	7–6	6–8	5–3	2–2
3	(Hokkaido) Loco Solare	9–7	6–7	—N/a		13–4	4–5	2–2
1	(Nagano Prefecture) SC Karuizawa Club	8–6	3–5	4–13	5–4	—N/a		2–2

=== Round robin results ===
All draw times are listed in Japan Standard Time (UTC+09:00).

==== Draw 1 ====
Thursday, September 11, 8:00 am

Sheet B	1	2	3	4	5	6	7	8	9	10	11	Final
(Hokkaido) Fortius (Yoshimura)	0	1	0	0	1	1	0	2	0	2	0	7
(Hokkaido) Loco Solare (Fujisawa)	0	0	1	2	0	0	2	0	2	0	2	9

==== Draw 2 ====
Thursday, September 11, 1:00 pm

Sheet B	1	2	3	4	5	6	7	8	9	10	Final
(Hokkaido) Loco Solare (Fujisawa)	0	0	2	3	1	3	1	0	3	X	13
(Nagano Prefecture) SC Karuizawa Club (Ueno)	0	1	0	0	0	0	0	3	0	X	4

==== Draw 3 ====
Thursday, September 11, 6:00 pm

Sheet B	1	2	3	4	5	6	7	8	9	10	Final
(Nagano Prefecture) SC Karuizawa Club (Ueno)	1	0	0	2	0	2	1	0	0	2	8
(Hokkaido) Fortius (Yoshimura)	0	1	1	0	1	0	0	2	1	0	6

==== Draw 4 ====
Friday, September 12, 8:00 am

Sheet B	1	2	3	4	5	6	7	8	9	10	Final
(Nagano Prefecture) SC Karuizawa Club (Ueno)	0	0	2	0	0	0	1	0	1	1	5
(Hokkaido) Loco Solare (Fujisawa)	0	1	0	0	0	2	0	1	0	0	4

==== Draw 5 ====
Friday, September 12, 1:00 pm

Sheet B	1	2	3	4	5	6	7	8	9	10	Final
(Hokkaido) Loco Solare (Fujisawa)	0	0	2	1	0	0	0	0	3	0	6
(Hokkaido) Fortius (Yoshimura)	1	1	0	0	0	3	0	1	0	1	7

==== Draw 6 ====
Friday, September 12, 6:00 pm

Sheet B	1	2	3	4	5	6	7	8	9	10	Final
(Hokkaido) Fortius (Yoshimura)	0	2	0	0	1	1	0	0	0	1	5
(Nagano Prefecture) SC Karuizawa Club (Ueno)	0	0	1	1	0	0	0	0	1	0	3

=== Tiebreaker ===
Saturday, September 13, 8:00 am

Sheet B	1	2	3	4	5	6	7	8	Final
(Hokkaido) Fortius (Yoshimura)	3	0	0	2	2	0	X	X	7
(Hokkaido) Loco Solare (Fujisawa)	0	1	0	0	0	1	X	X	2

=== Best-of-five ===
The teams' head-to-head games in rounds one and two were counted towards their best-of-five score.

Best-of-five
(Nagano Prefecture) SC Karuizawa Club	8	3	11	6	5
(Hokkaido) Fortius	6	5	3	7	6

==== Game 3 ====
Saturday, September 13, 2:00 pm

Sheet B	1	2	3	4	5	6	7	8	9	10	Final
(Nagano Prefecture) SC Karuizawa Club (Ueno)	3	0	3	1	0	2	1	1	X	X	11
(Hokkaido) Fortius (Yoshimura)	0	1	0	0	2	0	0	0	X	X	3

==== Game 4 ====
Sunday, September 14, 8:30 am

Sheet B	1	2	3	4	5	6	7	8	9	10	Final
(Nagano Prefecture) SC Karuizawa Club (Ueno)	0	0	2	0	1	0	2	0	1	0	6
(Hokkaido) Fortius (Yoshimura)	0	1	0	2	0	2	0	1	0	1	7

==== Game 5 ====
Sunday, September 14, 2:30 pm

Sheet B	1	2	3	4	5	6	7	8	9	10	Final
(Nagano Prefecture) SC Karuizawa Club (Ueno)	0	0	2	0	0	1	0	0	2	0	5
(Hokkaido) Fortius (Yoshimura)	0	1	0	0	3	0	0	1	0	1	6

== See also ==
- 2025 Japanese Olympic mixed doubles curling trials
