= Curling at the 2026 Winter Olympics – Women's tournament =

Women's curling at the XXV Olympic Winter Games
- Venue: Cortina Olympic Stadium
- Dates: 12–22 February
- Competitors: 50 from 10 nations

Medalists
1st place, gold medalist(s)		Anna Hasselborg; Sara McManus; Agnes Knochenhauer; Sofia Scharback; Johanna Heldin	Sweden
2nd place, silver medalist(s)		Alina Pätz; Silvana Tirinzoni; Carole Howald; Selina Witschonke; Stefanie Berset	Switzerland
3rd place, bronze medalist(s)		Rachel Homan; Tracy Fleury; Emma Miskew; Sarah Wilkes; Rachelle Brown	Canada

The women's curling tournament of the 2026 Winter Olympics was held at the Cortina Olympic Stadium in Cortina d’Ampezzo from 12 to 22 February 2026.

Ten nations competed in a round robin preliminary round, and the top four nations at the conclusion of the round robin qualified for the medal round.

Sweden won the gold medal with Switzerland taking silver and Canada the bronze.

== Competition schedule ==
RR	Round robin	SF	Semifinals	B	3rd place play-off	F	Final

Date Event	Thu 12	Fri 13	Sat 14	Sun 15	Mon 16	Tue 17	Wed 18	Thu 19	Fri 20	Sat 21	Sun 22
Women's Tournament	RR	RR	RR	RR	RR	RR	RR	RR	SF	B	F

== Qualification ==
The top seven nations based on combined rankings at the 2024 World Women's Curling Championship and 2025 World Women's Curling Championship qualified along with hosts Italy. The final two teams qualified through the 2025 Olympic Qualification Event.

Means of qualification	Dates	Location	Quotas	Qualified
Host nation	—N/a		1	Italy
Qualification points at the 2024 & 2025 World Championships	16–24 March 2024	Sydney, Canada	7	Canada; Switzerland; South Korea; Sweden; Denmark; Great Britain; China
Qualification points at the 2024 & 2025 World Championships	15–23 March 2025	Uijeongbu, South Korea	7	Canada; Switzerland; South Korea; Sweden; Denmark; Great Britain; China
Olympic Qualification Event	6–13 December 2025	Kelowna, Canada	2	Japan; United States
Total			10	

== Teams ==
The teams are listed as follows:

Canada	China	Denmark	Great Britain	Italy
Ottawa CC, Ottawa: Skip: Rachel Homan; Third: Tracy Fleury; Second: Emma Miskew; Lead: Sarah Wilkes; Alternate: Rachelle Brown	CSO Curling Club, Beijing: Skip: Wang Rui; Third: Han Yu; Second: Dong Ziqi; Lead: Jiang Jiayi; Alternate: Su Tingyu	Hvidovre CC, Hvidovre: Skip: Madeleine Dupont; Third: Mathilde Halse; Second: Jasmin Holtermann; Lead: Denise Dupont; Alternate: My Larsen	Curl Aberdeen, Aberdeen: Fourth: Rebecca Morrison; Third: Jennifer Dodds; Second: Sophie Sinclair; Skip: Sophie Jackson; Alternate: Fay Henderson	CC Dolomiti, Cortina d'Ampezzo: Skip: Stefania Constantini; Third: Elena Mathis; Second: Marta Lo Deserto; Lead: Giulia Zardini Lacedelli; Alternate: Rebecca Mariani
Japan	South Korea	Sweden	Switzerland	United States
Sapporo CC, Sapporo: Skip: Sayaka Yoshimura; Third: Kaho Onodera; Second: Yuna Kotani; Lead: Anna Ohmiya; Alternate: Mina Kobayashi	Uijeongbu CC, Uijeongbu: Skip: Gim Eun-ji; Third: Kim Min-ji; Second: Kim Su-ji; Lead: Seol Ye-eun; Alternate: Seol Ye-ji	Sundbybergs CK, Sundbyberg: Skip: Anna Hasselborg; Third: Sara McManus; Second: Agnes Knochenhauer; Lead: Sofia Scharback; Alternate: Johanna Heldin	CC Aarau, Aarau: Fourth: Alina Pätz; Skip: Silvana Tirinzoni; Second: Carole Howald; Lead: Selina Witschonke; Alternate: Stefanie Berset	St. Paul CC, St. Paul: Skip: Tabitha Peterson; Third: Cory Thiesse; Second: Tara Peterson; Lead: Taylor Anderson-Heide; Alternate: Aileen Geving

== Round robin standings ==
Final Round Robin Standings
Team	Skip	Pld	W	L	W–L	PF	PA	EW	EL	BE	SE	S%	DSC	Qualification
Sweden	Anna Hasselborg	9	7	2	–	65	50	45	32	5	14	81.7%	25.806	Playoffs
United States	Tabitha Peterson	9	6	3	2–0	60	54	40	37	3	13	82.1%	34.288	Playoffs
Switzerland	Silvana Tirinzoni	9	6	3	1–1	60	51	35	42	6	4	85.0%	44.338	Playoffs
Canada	Rachel Homan	9	6	3	0–2	76	59	45	38	2	9	80.3%	19.781	Playoffs
South Korea	Gim Eun-ji	9	5	4	1–0	60	53	37	35	8	11	81.2%	23.581	
Great Britain	Sophie Jackson	9	5	4	0–1	58	58	36	36	10	8	83.4%	16.938	
Denmark	Madeleine Dupont	9	4	5	–	49	58	36	38	3	11	77.0%	37.875	
Japan	Sayaka Yoshimura	9	2	7	1–1	51	69	35	43	3	6	78.6%	27.513	
Italy	Stefania Constantini	9	2	7	1–1	47	60	34	40	3	4	78.8%	34.719	
China	Wang Rui	9	2	7	1–1	56	70	37	39	3	9	82.7%	41.206	

Source: Official website

Women's round robin summary table
Pos	Team	W	L	SWE	USA	SUI	CAN	KOR	GBR	DEN	JPN	ITA	CHN
1	Sweden	7	2	—	9–4	6–4	6–8	3–8	10–7	6–5	8–4	8–6	9–4
2	United States	6	3	4–9	—	7–6	9–8	8–4	7–8	10–3	7–4	2–7	6–5
3	Switzerland	6	3	4–6	6–7	—	8–7	7–5	10–6	6–4	5–7	7–4	7–5
4	Canada	6	3	8–6	8–9	7–8	—	10–7	6–7	10–4	9–6	8–7	10–5
5	South Korea	5	4	8–3	4–8	5–7	7–10	—	9–3	3–6	7–5	7–2	10–9
6	Great Britain	5	4	7–10	8–7	6–10	7–6	3–9	—	7–2	9–3	7–4	4–7
7	Denmark	4	5	5–6	3–10	4–6	4–10	6–3	2–7	—	10–7	7–2	8–7
8	Japan	2	7	4–8	4–7	7–5	6–9	5–7	3–9	7–10	—	6–8	9–6
9	Italy	2	7	6–8	7–2	4–7	7–8	2–7	4–7	2–7	8–6	—	7–8
10	China	2	7	4–9	5–6	5–7	5–10	9–10	7–4	7–8	6–9	8–7	—

Legend: Blue = home team win; Red = away team win.

== Round robin results ==
All draw times are listed in Central European Time (UTC+01:00).

=== Draw 1 ===
Thursday, 12 February, 9:05

Sheet A	1	2	3	4	5	6	7	8	9	10	Final
South Korea (Gim) 🔨	0	1	1	0	0	0	0	2	0	0	4
United States (Peterson)	0	0	0	2	0	1	2	0	1	2	8

Sheet B	1	2	3	4	5	6	7	8	9	10	Final
Japan (Yoshimura)	0	0	1	0	0	2	0	1	0	X	4
Sweden (Hasselborg) 🔨	0	1	0	3	1	0	2	0	1	X	8

Sheet C	1	2	3	4	5	6	7	8	9	10	Final
Italy (Constantini) 🔨	1	0	0	1	0	1	0	0	1	X	4
Switzerland (Tirinzoni)	0	2	0	0	2	0	2	1	0	X	7

Sheet D	1	2	3	4	5	6	7	8	9	10	Final
Canada (Homan) 🔨	2	0	0	1	4	0	3	X	X	X	10
Denmark (Dupont)	0	2	1	0	0	1	0	X	X	X	4

=== Draw 2 ===
Thursday, 12 February, 19:05

Sheet A	1	2	3	4	5	6	7	8	9	10	Final
China (Wang)	0	0	0	2	0	0	2	2	0	1	7
Great Britain (Jackson) 🔨	0	0	2	0	0	1	0	0	1	0	4

Sheet B	1	2	3	4	5	6	7	8	9	10	Final
Italy (Constantini)	0	0	0	0	1	0	1	X	X	X	2
South Korea (Gim) 🔨	0	1	1	1	0	4	0	X	X	X	7

Sheet C	1	2	3	4	5	6	7	8	9	10	11	Final
Denmark (Dupont) 🔨	0	2	1	1	0	2	0	0	1	0	3	10
Japan (Yoshimura)	1	0	0	0	2	0	2	1	0	1	0	7

Sheet D	1	2	3	4	5	6	7	8	9	10	Final
Sweden (Hasselborg) 🔨	0	1	0	0	2	1	0	1	1	3	9
United States (Peterson)	0	0	1	1	0	0	2	0	0	0	4

=== Draw 3 ===
Friday, 13 February, 14:05

Sheet A	1	2	3	4	5	6	7	8	9	10	Final
Denmark (Dupont)	0	2	0	0	1	0	1	0	1	0	5
Sweden (Hasselborg) 🔨	0	0	1	2	0	1	0	1	0	1	6

Sheet B	1	2	3	4	5	6	7	8	9	10	Final
China (Wang)	0	0	1	1	0	1	0	0	2	X	5
Switzerland (Tirinzoni) 🔨	0	1	0	0	2	0	3	1	0	X	7

Sheet C	1	2	3	4	5	6	7	8	9	10	Final
United States (Peterson)	0	0	1	1	0	4	0	1	0	2	9
Canada (Homan) 🔨	0	2	0	0	1	0	2	0	3	0	8

Sheet D	1	2	3	4	5	6	7	8	9	10	Final
Great Britain (Jackson)	0	0	2	0	1	0	0	0	X	X	3
South Korea (Gim) 🔨	0	2	0	1	0	3	1	2	X	X	9

=== Draw 4 ===
Saturday, 14 February, 9:05

Sheet A	1	2	3	4	5	6	7	8	9	10	Final
Italy (Constantini)	0	1	0	2	0	1	0	3	0	0	7
China (Wang) 🔨	1	0	2	0	1	0	1	0	2	1	8

Sheet B	1	2	3	4	5	6	7	8	9	10	Final
Great Britain (Jackson)	0	0	3	1	0	1	0	2	0	0	7
Canada (Homan) 🔨	1	0	0	0	1	0	1	0	1	2	6

Sheet D	1	2	3	4	5	6	7	8	9	10	Final
Switzerland (Tirinzoni) 🔨	2	0	1	0	0	1	0	0	1	0	5
Japan (Yoshimura)	0	1	0	2	0	0	2	1	0	1	7

=== Draw 5 ===
Saturday, 14 February, 19:05

Sheet A	1	2	3	4	5	6	7	8	9	10	11	Final
Canada (Homan) 🔨	1	1	2	0	0	1	0	1	0	1	0	7
Switzerland (Tirinzoni)	0	0	0	1	1	0	4	0	1	0	1	8

Sheet B	1	2	3	4	5	6	7	8	9	10	Final
Japan (Yoshimura) 🔨	0	1	0	2	0	0	0	0	1	X	4
United States (Peterson)	0	0	2	0	1	1	0	3	0	X	7

Sheet C	1	2	3	4	5	6	7	8	9	10	Final
South Korea (Gim) 🔨	0	0	1	0	1	0	0	1	0	0	3
Denmark (Dupont)	0	1	0	1	0	1	1	0	1	1	6

Sheet D	1	2	3	4	5	6	7	8	9	10	Final
Italy (Constantini) 🔨	0	2	0	2	0	0	1	0	1	0	6
Sweden (Hasselborg)	1	0	2	0	2	1	0	1	0	1	8

=== Draw 6 ===
Sunday, 15 February, 14:05

Sheet A	1	2	3	4	5	6	7	8	9	10	Final
Japan (Yoshimura) 🔨	0	0	0	2	0	1	0	0	2	0	5
South Korea (Gim)	0	1	1	0	1	0	0	3	0	1	7

Sheet B	1	2	3	4	5	6	7	8	9	10	Final
Denmark (Dupont) 🔨	0	2	0	1	1	2	1	0	X	X	7
Italy (Constantini)	0	0	1	0	0	0	0	1	X	X	2

Sheet C	1	2	3	4	5	6	7	8	9	10	Final
Great Britain (Jackson) 🔨	2	0	1	0	0	0	2	0	2	0	7
Sweden (Hasselborg)	0	3	0	3	1	1	0	1	0	1	10

Sheet D	1	2	3	4	5	6	7	8	9	10	Final
United States (Peterson)	0	0	1	0	0	2	0	1	1	1	6
China (Wang) 🔨	0	2	0	1	1	0	1	0	0	0	5

=== Draw 7 ===
Monday, 16 February, 9:05

Sheet B	1	2	3	4	5	6	7	8	9	10	Final
Sweden (Hasselborg) 🔨	0	1	0	2	0	1	0	1	0	1	6
Switzerland (Tirinzoni)	0	0	2	0	1	0	0	0	1	0	4

Sheet C	1	2	3	4	5	6	7	8	9	10	Final
China (Wang) 🔨	0	1	1	0	1	0	2	0	0	X	5
Canada (Homan)	0	0	0	4	0	3	0	2	1	X	10

Sheet D	1	2	3	4	5	6	7	8	9	10	Final
Denmark (Dupont)	0	1	0	0	1	0	0	0	X	X	2
Great Britain (Jackson) 🔨	2	0	0	1	0	2	1	1	X	X	7

=== Draw 8 ===
Monday, 16 February, 19:05

Sheet A	1	2	3	4	5	6	7	8	9	10	Final
United States (Peterson) 🔨	0	0	0	0	0	1	0	1	0	X	2
Italy (Constantini)	0	0	1	2	1	0	1	0	2	X	7

Sheet B	1	2	3	4	5	6	7	8	9	10	Final
South Korea (Gim) 🔨	0	0	3	0	4	0	0	1	0	2	10
China (Wang)	0	0	0	2	0	3	1	0	3	0	9

Sheet C	1	2	3	4	5	6	7	8	9	10	Final
Switzerland (Tirinzoni)	0	0	2	0	1	0	3	0	4	X	10
Great Britain (Jackson) 🔨	0	1	0	1	0	2	0	2	0	X	6

Sheet D	1	2	3	4	5	6	7	8	9	10	Final
Japan (Yoshimura) 🔨	2	0	0	1	0	0	1	0	2	0	6
Canada (Homan)	0	2	3	0	1	1	0	1	0	1	9

=== Draw 9 ===
Tuesday, 17 February, 14:05

Sheet A	1	2	3	4	5	6	7	8	9	10	Final
Sweden (Hasselborg)	0	0	1	0	3	0	1	0	1	0	6
Canada (Homan) 🔨	0	2	0	1	0	1	0	2	0	2	8

Sheet B	1	2	3	4	5	6	7	8	9	10	Final
Italy (Constantini) 🔨	0	1	0	3	0	1	0	1	0	2	8
Japan (Yoshimura)	0	0	1	0	3	0	1	0	1	0	6

Sheet C	1	2	3	4	5	6	7	8	9	10	Final
Denmark (Dupont)	0	1	0	1	0	0	1	0	X	X	3
United States (Peterson) 🔨	1	0	2	0	1	2	0	4	X	X	10

Sheet D	1	2	3	4	5	6	7	8	9	10	Final
South Korea (Gim) 🔨	1	0	1	1	0	0	0	1	0	1	5
Switzerland (Tirinzoni)	0	3	0	0	0	1	1	0	2	0	7

=== Draw 10 ===
Wednesday, 18 February, 9:05

Sheet A	1	2	3	4	5	6	7	8	9	10	Final
China (Wang)	0	1	0	1	1	2	1	0	1	0	7
Denmark (Dupont) 🔨	2	0	4	0	0	0	0	1	0	1	8

Sheet B	1	2	3	4	5	6	7	8	9	10	Final
United States (Peterson) 🔨	1	0	0	1	1	0	3	1	0	0	7
Great Britain (Jackson)	0	1	1	0	0	2	0	0	2	2	8

Sheet C	1	2	3	4	5	6	7	8	9	10	Final
Sweden (Hasselborg)	0	0	0	0	1	1	1	X	X	X	3
South Korea (Gim) 🔨	3	1	2	2	0	0	0	X	X	X	8

=== Draw 11 ===
Wednesday, 18 February, 19:05

Sheet A	1	2	3	4	5	6	7	8	9	10	Final
Great Britain (Jackson) 🔨	0	3	1	0	2	0	2	1	X	X	9
Japan (Yoshimura)	0	0	0	1	0	2	0	0	X	X	3

Sheet B	1	2	3	4	5	6	7	8	9	10	Final
Switzerland (Tirinzoni) 🔨	0	2	0	0	0	0	0	1	0	3	6
Denmark (Dupont)	0	0	0	0	2	1	0	0	1	0	4

Sheet C	1	2	3	4	5	6	7	8	9	10	11	Final
Canada (Homan)	0	2	0	1	0	2	0	0	2	0	1	8
Italy (Constantini) 🔨	1	0	1	0	0	0	1	1	0	3	0	7

Sheet D	1	2	3	4	5	6	7	8	9	10	Final
China (Wang)	0	0	0	3	0	0	1	0	X	X	4
Sweden (Hasselborg) 🔨	0	2	2	0	1	1	0	3	X	X	9

=== Draw 12 ===
Thursday, 19 February, 14:30

Sheet A	1	2	3	4	5	6	7	8	9	10	11	Final
Switzerland (Tirinzoni)	0	0	1	0	0	1	0	1	0	3	0	6
United States (Peterson) 🔨	0	1	0	1	1	0	2	0	1	0	1	7

Sheet B	1	2	3	4	5	6	7	8	9	10	Final
Canada (Homan) 🔨	1	1	0	2	0	4	0	1	0	1	10
South Korea (Gim)	0	0	3	0	1	0	1	0	2	0	7

Sheet C	1	2	3	4	5	6	7	8	9	10	Final
Japan (Yoshimura)	0	0	2	2	0	1	0	1	1	2	9
China (Wang) 🔨	0	1	0	0	3	0	2	0	0	0	6

Sheet D	1	2	3	4	5	6	7	8	9	10	Final
Great Britain (Jackson) 🔨	0	1	0	2	1	0	0	0	3	0	7
Italy (Constantini)	0	0	1	0	0	2	0	0	0	1	4

== Playoffs ==
Semifinals
1	Sweden	6
4	Canada	3
2	United States	4
3	Switzerland	7

Gold medal game
1	Sweden	6
3	Switzerland	5
Bronze medal game
4	Canada	10
2	United States	7

=== Semifinals ===
Friday, 20 February, 14:05

Sheet B	1	2	3	4	5	6	7	8	9	10	Final
Sweden (Hasselborg) 🔨	1	0	1	0	0	2	1	0	1	X	6
Canada (Homan)	0	1	0	1	0	0	0	1	0	X	3

Player percentages
Sweden		Canada	
Sofia Scharback	89%	Sarah Wilkes	83%
Agnes Knochenhauer	83%	Emma Miskew	74%
Sara McManus	81%	Tracy Fleury	68%
Anna Hasselborg	83%	Rachel Homan	70%
Total	84%	Total	73%

Sheet D	1	2	3	4	5	6	7	8	9	10	Final
United States (Peterson) 🔨	1	0	1	0	1	0	0	0	1	0	4
Switzerland (Tirinzoni)	0	2	0	2	0	0	0	1	0	2	7

Player percentages
United States		Switzerland	
Taylor Anderson-Heide	78%	Selina Witschonke	80%
Tara Peterson	83%	Carole Howald	90%
Cory Thiesse	83%	Silvana Tirinzoni	81%
Tabitha Peterson	83%	Alina Pätz	99%
Total	81%	Total	88%

=== Bronze medal game ===
Saturday, 21 February, 14:05

Sheet C	1	2	3	4	5	6	7	8	9	10	Final
Canada (Homan)	0	1	0	1	0	3	0	3	0	2	10
United States (Peterson) 🔨	1	0	1	0	1	0	2	0	2	0	7

Player percentages
Canada		United States	
Sarah Wilkes	98%	Taylor Anderson-Heide	75%
Emma Miskew	90%	Tara Peterson	81%
Tracy Fleury	91%	Cory Thiesse	84%
Rachel Homan	78%	Tabitha Peterson	76%
Total	89%	Total	79%

=== Gold medal game ===
Sunday, 22 February, 11:05

Sheet C	1	2	3	4	5	6	7	8	9	10	Final
Sweden (Hasselborg) 🔨	2	0	0	0	1	0	1	1	0	1	6
Switzerland (Tirinzoni)	0	0	0	1	0	2	0	0	2	0	5

Player percentages
Sweden		Switzerland	
Sofia Scharback	85%	Selina Witschonke	98%
Agnes Knochenhauer	81%	Carole Howald	75%
Sara McManus	80%	Silvana Tirinzoni	79%
Anna Hasselborg	84%	Alina Pätz	80%
Total	83%	Total	83%

== Final standings ==
The final standings are:

Place	Team
1st place, gold medalist(s)	Sweden
2nd place, silver medalist(s)	Switzerland
3rd place, bronze medalist(s)	Canada
4	United States
5	South Korea
6	Great Britain
7	Denmark
8	Japan
9	Italy
10	China

== Statistics ==
=== Player percentages ===
Percentages by draw.

==== Lead ====
#	Curler	1	2	3	4	5	6	7	8	9	Total
1	Jiang Jiayi (CHN)	99	96	96	83	93	99	73	95	95	92.0
2	Sophie Jackson (GBR)	85	83	92	99	95	92	88	92	90	90.6
3	Selina Witschonke (SUI)	97	90	84	90	83	93	88	85	92	88.9
4	Taylor Anderson-Heide (USA)	85	88	94	89	76	97	83	88	90	87.6
5	Sofia Scharback (SWE)	90	79	89	88	94	89	74	83	92	86.1
6	Anna Ohmiya (JPN)	86	75	86	99	83	93	81	73	93	85.3
7	Sarah Wilkes (CAN)	73	79	91	83	96	80	93	82	88	85.1
8	Seol Ye-eun (KOR)	80	77	89	88	90	81	91	68	94	84.9
9	Giulia Zardini Lacedelli (ITA)	78	88	78	91	92	88	88	78 (2)	84 (2)	84.5
10	Denise Dupont (DEN)	73	86	79	79	95	86	80	64	78	79.7

==== Second ====
#	Curler	1	2	3	4	5	6	7	8	9	Total
1	Carole Howald (SUI)	88	85	81	78	91	88	95	76	85	85.1
2	Agnes Knochenhauer (SWE)	88	85	90	73	95	90	78	75	70	83.0
3	Kim Su-ji (KOR)	71	84	78	84	84	79	–	93	80	81.1
4	Dong Ziqi (CHN)	75	80	88	85	78	81	75	75	91	81.0
5	Marta Lo Deserto (ITA)	85	68	80	78	73	96	80	–	–	80.4
6	Tara Peterson (USA)	81	80	83	90	83	75	89	82	65	80.3
7	Sophie Sinclair (GBR)	89	67	80	85	83	72	66	98	79	79.8
8	Yuna Kotani (JPN)	93	75	75	81	75	71	–	78	80	78.2
9	Emma Miskew (CAN)	77	76	81	80	83	81	83	64	80	78.1
10	Jasmin Holtermann (DEN)	68	61	79	79	91	81	64	79	89	76.7

==== Third ====
#	Curler	1	2	3	4	5	6	7	8	9	Total
1	Silvana Tirinzoni (SUI)	92	79	84	72	88	89	93	83	89	84.9
2	Han Yu (CHN)	85	86	79	90	83	84	80	80	84	83.5
3	Kim Min-ji (KOR)	86	89	86	76	89	93	73	79	78	82.9
4	Jennifer Dodds (GBR)	84	83	84	81	91	79	64	88	85	81.6
5	Cory Thiesse (USA)	83	91	75	81	80	72	78	88	77	80.6
6	Tracy Fleury (CAN)	82	71	91	75	85	81	81	78	71	79.3
7	Sara McManus (SWE)	89	79	80	75	88	85	70	61	70	78.0
8	Kaho Onodera (JPN)	74	75	73	85	86	73	74	86	79	77.9
9	Elena Mathis (ITA)	71	70	73	79	84	94	68	81	79	77.7
10	Mathilde Halse (DEN)	68	77	83	71	78	67	75	70	86	75.5

==== Fourth ====
#	Curler	1	2	3	4	5	6	7	8	9	Total
1	Rebecca Morrison (GBR)	71	63	88	76	98	90	69	88	94	81.6
2	Alina Pätz (SUI)	96	85	64	69	80	88	84	85	82	80.8
3	Anna Hasselborg (SWE)	85	82	79	89	91	86	71	55	77	80.3
4	Tabitha Peterson (USA)	75	74	85	96	71	74	77	78	89	79.8
5	Rachel Homan (CAN)	68	79	70	81	85	84	78	77	85	78.7
6	Gim Eun-ji (KOR)	70	75	83	66	90	76	75	77	83	77.2
7	Madeleine Dupont (DEN)	73	69	80	79	89	73	64	70	86	75.9
8	Wang Rui (CHN)	84	68	81	75	69	84	65	67	73	74.3
9	Sayaka Yoshimura (JPN)	67	66	83	69	84	73	71	58	85	73.1
10	Stefania Constantini (ITA)	75	61	80	64	66	92	68	74	71	72.6

==== Alternate ====
#	Curler	1	2	3	4	5	6	7	8	9	Total
1	Rebecca Mariani (ITA)	–	–	–	–	–	–	–	74 (1)	86 (1)	79.8
2	Mina Kobayashi (JPN)	–	–	–	–	–	–	76 (2)	–	–	76.3
3	Johanna Heldin (SWE)	–	–	–	–	100 (1)	–	–	50 (1)	–	71.4
4	Seol Ye-ji (KOR)	–	–	–	–	–	–	70 (2)	–	–	70.0

==== Team total ====
#	Team	1	2	3	4	5	6	7	8	9	Total
1	Switzerland	93	85	78	77	85	89	90	82	87	85.0
2	Great Britain	82	74	86	85	92	83	72	91	87	83.4
3	China	86	83	86	83	81	87	73	79	86	82.7
4	United States	81	83	84	89	78	80	82	84	80	82.1
5	Sweden	88	81	84	81	92	88	73	66	77	81.7
6	South Korea	77	81	84	78	88	82	77	79	83	81.2
7	Canada	75	76	83	80	87	82	83	75	81	80.3
8	Italy	77	71	78	78	79	92	76	77	80	78.8
9	Japan	80	73	79	83	82	77	76	74	84	78.6
10	Denmark	71	74	80	77	88	77	71	71	84	77.0
