= Mathilde Halse =

Danish curler (born 1999)

- Curler
- Born: 2 May 1999 (age 27); Nuuk, Greenland

Team
- Curling club: Hvidovre CC, Hvidovre; Gentofte CC, Gentofte
- Skip: Madeleine Dupont
- Third: Mathilde Halse
- Second: Katrine Schmidt
- Lead: Denise Dupont
- Alternate: Jasmin Holtermann

Curling career
- Member Association: Denmark
- World Championship: 6 (2021, 2022, 2023, 2024, 2025, 2026)
- European Championship: 9 (2017, 2018, 2019, 2021, 2022, 2023, 2024, 2025, 2026)
- Olympic: 3 (2018, 2022, 2026)
Medal record
Women's curling
Representing Denmark
European Curling Championships
Gold medal – first place	2022 Östersund

Mathilde Emma Halse (born 2 May 1999) is a Danish curler from Copenhagen. She competed in the 2018 Winter Olympics and 2022 Winter Olympics. She currently plays third on the Danish National Women's Curling Team skipped by Madeleine Dupont.

== Career ==
She started curling in 2014. Before that she was a figure skater. Halse became the skip of the Danish National Junior Women's Curling Team in 2019, where she skipped the team at the 2019 World Junior-B Curling Championships (January). They lost in the quarterfinals and would not qualify for the World Juniors. Later that year, she became the skip of the National Women's Team and represented Denmark at the 2019 European Curling Championships, where they went 2–7. This qualified them for the 2020 World Women's Curling Championship, which was cancelled due to the COVID-19 pandemic. At the 2019 World Junior-B Curling Championships (December), the team was successful in qualifying for the 2020 World Junior Curling Championships in Krasnoyarsk, Russia where they went 4–5.

Halse competed at the 2021 World Women's Curling Championship as third for the Danish team skipped by Madeleine Dupont. The event was played in a bio-secure "bubble" to prevent the spread of the virus. The Danish team qualified for the playoffs for the first time since 2011, finishing the round robin with an 8–5 record. They then lost in the qualification game to the United States, skipped by Tabitha Peterson 8–7.

Halse became European champion with the Danish national team at the 2022 Women's European Curling Championships after an extra-end win over the Swiss team skipped by Silvana Tirinzoni. This was a second-ever European title for Danish women, with the previous win coming in 1994.

In April 2023, Halse announced on social media that she would take a break from competitive curling for a season to focus on her studies.

== Personal life ==
As of 2024, Halse has completed a physiotherapy education. She works as a physiotherapist.
