= Madeleine Dupont =

Danish curler (born 1987)

- Curler
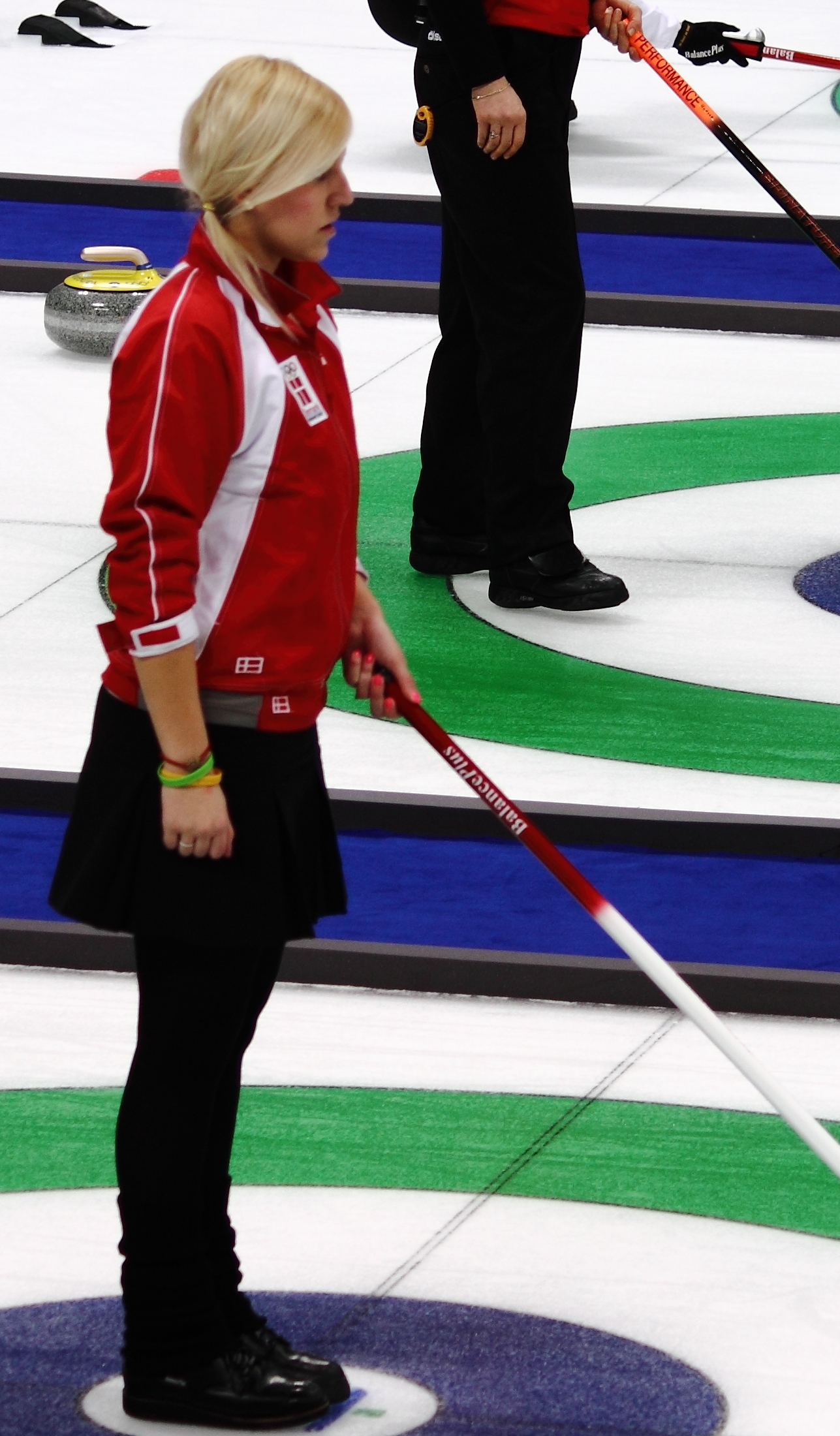
- Dupont at the 2010 Winter Olympics
- Born: 26 May 1987 (age 39); Glostrup, Denmark

Team
- Curling club: Hvidovre CC, Hvidovre
- Skip: Madeleine Dupont
- Third: Mathilde Halse
- Second: Katrine Schmidt
- Lead: Denise Dupont
- Alternate: Jasmin Holtermann

Curling career
- Member Association: Denmark
- World Championship: 17 (2004, 2005, 2006, 2007, 2008, 2009, 2010, 2014, 2016, 2017, 2019, 2021, 2022, 2023, 2024, 2025, 2026)
- European Championship: 14 (2002, 2004, 2006, 2008, 2009, 2016, 2017, 2018, 2021, 2022, 2023, 2024, 2025, 2026)
- Olympic: 4 (2010, 2018, 2022, 2026)
Medal record
Curling
Representing Denmark
World Curling Championships
Silver medal – second place	2007 Aomori
Bronze medal – third place	2009 Gangneung
European Curling Championships
Gold medal – first place	2022 Östersund
Silver medal – second place	2002 Grindelwald
Bronze medal – third place	2008 Örnsköldsvik
Bronze medal – third place	2009 Aberdeen
World Junior Curling Championships
Bronze medal – third place	2007 Eveleth

Madeleine Kanstrup Dupont (born 26 May 1987 in Glostrup, Denmark) is a Danish curler from Copenhagen. She won the Frances Brodie Award in 2004. She currently skips her own team with teammates Mathilde Halse, Denise Dupont (Madeleine's sister), Jasmin Holtermann, and Katrine Schmidt.

Dupont has competed in four Olympic Games and 17 World Championships, winning medals at the 2007 World Women's Curling Championship (silver) and the 2009 World Women's Curling Championship (bronze). She won a gold medal at the World Junior-B Curling Championships in 2004 and a silver medal in 2002 at the European Curling championships as an alternate for Dorthe Holm's team. She also won a bronze medal at the 2007 World Junior Curling Championships. She won two bronze medals at the European Championships, throwing last rocks for Denmark, in 2008 and 2009. In 2022, she became European champion after an extra-end win over Switzerland in the final. This was a second-ever European title for Danish women, with the previous win coming in 1994.

At the Olympics, Dupont threw last rocks for her country at the 2010 Vancouver Games, where the team finished in fourth place. She skipped the Danish team at the 2018 Winter Olympics in PyeongChang to a 10th-place finish, and again at the 2022 Beijing Olympics, finishing 9th. Her team finished in 7th place at the 2026 Winter Olympics.

On the World Curling Tour, she won the Yi Chun Ladies International event in Yichun, Heilongjiang in December 2011 and the 2021 Women's Masters Basel. Dupont and her team has also curled in many Tier 2 events at the Grand Slam of Curling.

As of August 2023, Dupont is a coordinator for the Danish curling elite programme.

== Personal life ==
Dupont was featured topless in a calendar to promote curling. About the picture, she stated, "If a picture of me can get more people to watch curling on TV, that's a good thing".

Dupont was a client manager at TV 2 in Denmark. She left her job and focused entirely on sports starting in May 2026.

She is married and has one son.

Dupont is part of a curling family, her father Kim Dupont competed at two World Junior Championships, and her brother Oliver Dupont won a silver medal at the 2016 World Men's Championship, and her sister Denise Dupont has been a long-time teammate.

== Grand Slam record ==
Key
C	Champion
F	Lost in Final
SF	Lost in Semifinal
QF	Lost in Quarterfinals
R16	Lost in the round of 16
Q	Did not advance to playoffs
T2	Played in Tier 2 event
DNP	Did not participate in event
N/A	Not a Grand Slam event that season

Event	2021–22	2022–23	2023–24	2024–25	2025–26	2026–27
Invitational	N/A	T2	T2	T2	DNP	Q
Masters	DNP	DNP	DNP	DNP	T2	DNP
Open	N/A	DNP	DNP	DNP	T2	DNP
Champions Cup	Q	DNP	N/A	N/A	N/A	N/A

=== Former events ===
Event	2009–10
Autumn Gold	Q

== Teammates ==
- 2007 Aomori World Championships
- 2009 Gangneung World Championships
- 2010 Vancouver Olympic Games
- Denise Dupont, Third
- Angelina Jensen, Skip
- Camilla Jensen, Lead
- Ane Hansen, Alternate
