= Curling at the 2026 Winter Olympics =

Curling at the XXV Olympic Winter Games
- Curling pictogram
- Venue: Cortina Olympic Stadium
- Dates: 4–22 February 2026
- No. of events: 3 (1 men, 1 women, 1 mixed)
- Competitors: 112 from 14 nations

Men's curling at the XXV Olympic Winter Games

Medalists
1st place, gold medalist(s)		Canada
2nd place, silver medalist(s)		Great Britain
3rd place, bronze medalist(s)		Switzerland

Women's curling at the XXV Olympic Winter Games

Medalists
1st place, gold medalist(s)		Sweden
2nd place, silver medalist(s)		Switzerland
3rd place, bronze medalist(s)		Canada

Mixed doubles curling at the XXV Olympic Winter Games

Medalists
1st place, gold medalist(s)		Sweden
2nd place, silver medalist(s)		United States
3rd place, bronze medalist(s)		Italy

The curling competitions of the 2026 Winter Olympics were held at the Cortina Olympic Stadium in Cortina d'Ampezzo. Curling competitions took place every day of the Games, from 4 to 22 February. This was the ninth time that curling has appeared on the Olympic program.

Ten nations competed in each of the three categories: men's, women's, and mixed doubles. There were 120 quota spots (60 per sex) distributed to the sport of curling, however athletes could compete in both men's/women's and mixed doubles if their nation has qualified and the athlete is nominated for both events by their NOC. A total of three events were contested, one for men, one for women, and one mixed.

Both the men's and women's Canadian curling teams were accused of delivery violations, specifically touching the stone after it reached the hog line, and touching the granite surface of the stone rather than just the handle.

== Qualification ==
As the host, Italy automatically qualified a team for each event.

Qualification to the curling tournaments at the Winter Olympics was determined through two methods:

1. The eight highest ranked National Olympic Committees (NOCs) from a list generated by Olympic Qualification Points earned at the 2024 and 2025 women's, men's and mixed doubles world championships qualified for the Olympic Winter Games. In the event of the hosts of the Olympic Winter Games, Italy, finishing in the top eight places of the respective discipline, only the seven highest ranked NOCs would qualify for the Olympic Winter Games through this path.
2. The remaining two spaces in each event were decided at the Olympic Qualification Event, held in December 2025 at the Kelowna Curling Club in Kelowna, Canada.

Summary

Nations	Men	Women	Mixed doubles	Athletes
Canada	Yes	Yes	Yes	11
China	Yes	Yes		10
Czech Republic	Yes		Yes	7
Denmark		Yes		5
Estonia			Yes	2
Germany	Yes			5
Great Britain	Yes	Yes	Yes	10
Italy	Yes	Yes	Yes	10
Japan		Yes		5
Norway	Yes		Yes	7
South Korea		Yes	Yes	7
Sweden	Yes	Yes	Yes	11
Switzerland	Yes	Yes	Yes	11
United States	Yes	Yes	Yes	11
Total: 14 NOCs	10	10	10	112

== Competition schedule ==
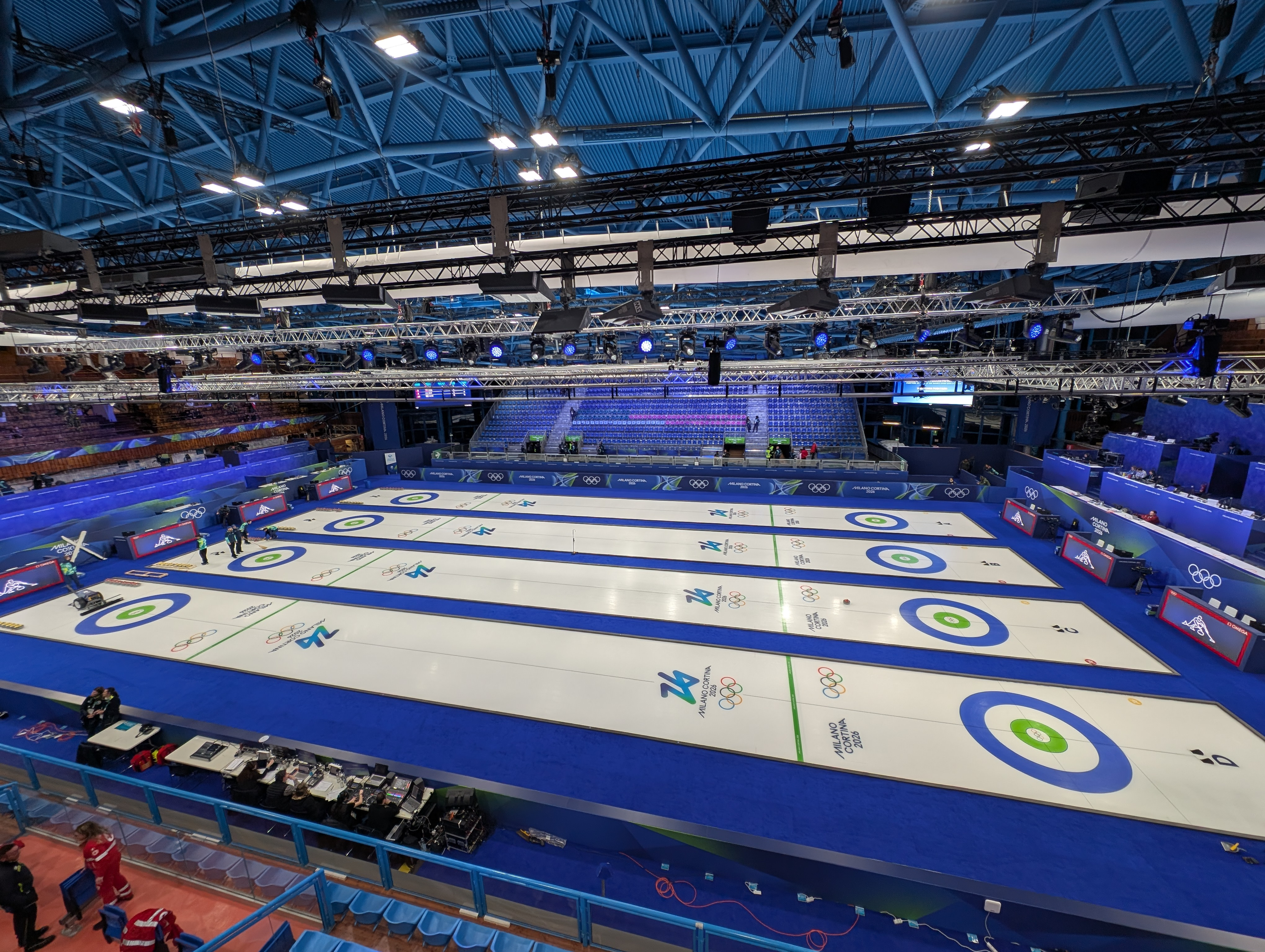
The Cortina Olympic Stadium hosted the curling events.

The curling competitions were scheduled to start two days before the Opening Ceremony and finish on the last day of the Games. Curling is the only sport to be contested on every day of the Games. The following is the schedule for the curling competitions:

RR	Round robin	SF	Semifinals	B	3rd place play-off	F	Final

Date Event	Wed 4	Thu 5	Fri 6	Sat 7	Sun 8	Mon 9		Tue 10		Wed 11	Thu 12	Fri 13	Sat 14	Sun 15	Mon 16	Tue 17	Wed 18	Thu 19		Fri 20	Sat 21	Sun 22
Men's tournament										RR	RR	RR	RR	RR	RR	RR	RR	RR	SF	B	F	
Women's tournament											RR	RR	RR	RR	RR	RR	RR	RR		SF	B	F
Mixed doubles	RR	RR	RR	RR	RR	RR	SF	B	F													

== Medal summary ==
=== Medal table ===
* Host nation (Italy)

Rank	Nation	Gold	Silver	Bronze	Total
1	Sweden	2	0	0	2
2	Canada	1	0	1	2
3	Switzerland	0	1	1	2
4	Great Britain	0	1	0	1
4	United States	0	1	0	1
6	Italy*	0	0	1	1
Totals (6 entries)		3	3	3	9

=== Medalists ===
Event	Gold	Silver	Bronze
Men	Canada; Brad Jacobs; Marc Kennedy; Brett Gallant; Ben Hebert; Tyler Tardi	Great Britain; Bruce Mouat; Grant Hardie; Bobby Lammie; Hammy McMillan Jr. Kyle Waddell	Switzerland; Benoît Schwarz-van Berkel; Yannick Schwaller; Sven Michel; Pablo Lachat-Couchepin; Kim Schwaller
Women	Sweden; Anna Hasselborg; Sara McManus; Agnes Knochenhauer; Sofia Scharback; Johanna Heldin	Switzerland; Alina Pätz; Silvana Tirinzoni; Carole Howald; Selina Witschonke; Stefanie Berset	Canada; Rachel Homan; Tracy Fleury; Emma Miskew; Sarah Wilkes; Rachelle Brown
Mixed doubles	Sweden; Isabella Wranå; Rasmus Wranå	United States; Cory Thiesse; Korey Dropkin	Italy; Stefania Constantini; Amos Mosaner

== Teams ==
The teams that competed at the 2026 Olympics in each discipline are as follows:

=== Men ===
Canada	China	Czech Republic	Germany	Great Britain
Skip: Brad Jacobs; Third: Marc Kennedy; Second: Brett Gallant; Lead: Ben Hebert; Alternate: Tyler Tardi	Skip: Xu Xiaoming; Third: Fei Xueqing; Second: Li Zhichao; Lead: Xu Jingtao; Alternate: Wang Zhenhao	Skip: Lukáš Klíma; Third: Marek Černovský; Second: Martin Jurík; Lead: Lukáš Klípa; Alternate: Radek Boháč	Skip: Marc Muskatewitz; Third: Benjamin Kapp; Second: Felix Messenzehl; Lead: Johannes Scheuerl; Alternate: Mario Trevisiol	Skip: Bruce Mouat; Third: Grant Hardie; Second: Bobby Lammie; Lead: Hammy McMillan Jr. Alternate: Kyle Waddell
Italy	Norway	Sweden	Switzerland	United States
Skip: Joël Retornaz; Third: Amos Mosaner; Second: Sebastiano Arman; Lead: Mattia Giovanella; Alternate: Alberto Pimpini	Skip: Magnus Ramsfjell; Third: Martin Sesaker; Second: Bendik Ramsfjell; Lead: Gaute Nepstad; Alternate: Willhelm Næss	Skip: Niklas Edin; Third: Oskar Eriksson; Second: Rasmus Wranå; Lead: Christoffer Sundgren; Alternate: Simon Olofsson	Fourth: Benoît Schwarz-van Berkel; Skip: Yannick Schwaller; Second: Sven Michel; Lead: Pablo Lachat-Couchepin; Alternate: Kim Schwaller	Skip: Daniel Casper; Third: Luc Violette; Second: Ben Richardson; Lead: Aidan Oldenburg; Alternate: Rich Ruohonen

=== Women ===
Canada	China	Denmark	Great Britain	Italy
Skip: Rachel Homan; Third: Tracy Fleury; Second: Emma Miskew; Lead: Sarah Wilkes; Alternate: Rachelle Brown	Skip: Wang Rui; Third: Han Yu; Second: Dong Ziqi; Lead: Jiang Jiayi; Alternate: Su Tingyu	Skip: Madeleine Dupont; Third: Mathilde Halse; Second: Jasmin Holtermann; Lead: Denise Dupont; Alternate: My Larsen	Fourth: Rebecca Morrison; Third: Jennifer Dodds; Second: Sophie Sinclair; Skip: Sophie Jackson; Alternate: Fay Henderson	Skip: Stefania Constantini; Third: Elena Mathis; Second: Marta Lo Deserto; Lead: Giulia Zardini Lacedelli; Alternate: Rebecca Mariani
Japan	South Korea	Sweden	Switzerland	United States
Skip: Sayaka Yoshimura; Third: Kaho Onodera; Second: Yuna Kotani; Lead: Anna Ohmiya; Alternate: Mina Kobayashi	Skip: Gim Eun-ji; Third: Kim Min-ji; Second: Kim Su-ji; Lead: Seol Ye-eun; Alternate: Seol Ye-ji	Skip: Anna Hasselborg; Third: Sara McManus; Second: Agnes Knochenhauer; Lead: Sofia Scharback; Alternate: Johanna Heldin	Fourth: Alina Pätz; Skip: Silvana Tirinzoni; Second: Carole Howald; Lead: Selina Witschonke; Alternate: Stefanie Berset	Skip: Tabitha Peterson; Third: Cory Thiesse; Second: Tara Peterson; Lead: Taylor Anderson-Heide; Alternate: Aileen Geving

=== Mixed doubles ===
Canada	Czech Republic	Estonia	Great Britain	Italy
Female: Jocelyn Peterman; Male: Brett Gallant	Female: Julie Zelingrová; Male: Vít Chabičovský	Female: Marie Kaldvee; Male: Harri Lill	Female: Jennifer Dodds; Male: Bruce Mouat	Female: Stefania Constantini; Male: Amos Mosaner
Norway	South Korea	Sweden	Switzerland	United States
Female: Kristin Skaslien; Male: Magnus Nedregotten	Female: Kim Seon-yeong; Male: Jeong Yeong-seok	Female: Isabella Wranå; Male: Rasmus Wranå	Female: Briar Schwaller-Hürlimann; Male: Yannick Schwaller	Female: Cory Thiesse; Male: Korey Dropkin

== Results summary ==
=== Men's tournament ===
==== Round robin ====
Standings

Final Round Robin Standings
Team	Skip	Pld	W	L	W–L	PF	PA	EW	EL	BE	SE	S%	DSC	Qualification
Switzerland	Yannick Schwaller	9	9	0	–	75	40	42	30	3	8	88.7%	9.506	Playoffs
Canada	Brad Jacobs	9	7	2	–	63	45	40	28	8	13	86.5%	28.844	Playoffs
Norway	Magnus Ramsfjell	9	5	4	1–0	60	61	37	38	6	7	80.8%	26.938	Playoffs
Great Britain	Bruce Mouat	9	5	4	0–1	63	48	39	33	2	10	86.4%	16.613	Playoffs
United States	Daniel Casper	9	4	5	1–1	52	65	34	37	5	3	81.7%	17.663	
Italy	Joël Retornaz	9	4	5	1–1	58	67	33	39	6	7	83.0%	17.869	
Germany	Marc Muskatewitz	9	4	5	1–1	51	57	36	37	8	7	84.4%	24.850	
Czech Republic	Lukáš Klíma	9	3	6	–	54	63	35	41	3	5	79.8%	29.013	
Sweden	Niklas Edin	9	2	7	1–0	44	63	31	39	6	3	82.5%	26.000	
China	Xu Xiaoming	9	2	7	0–1	52	63	35	40	3	5	81.4%	34.875	

Source: Official website

Results

Men's round robin summary table
Pos	Team	W	L	SUI	CAN	NOR	GBR	USA	ITA	GER	CZE	SWE	CHN
1	Switzerland	9	0	—	9–5	10–4	6–5	8–3	9–5	8–4	7–3	9–4	9–7
2	Canada	7	2	5–9	—	6–8	9–5	6–3	8–3	7–6	8–2	8–6	6–3
3	Norway	5	4	4–10	8–6	—	7–6	8–10	10–7	4–5	7–4	4–7	8–6
4	Great Britain	5	4	5–6	5–9	6–7	—	9–2	7–9	9–4	7–4	6–3	9–4
5	United States	4	5	3–8	3–6	10–8	2–9	—	5–8	8–6	8–7	8–5	5–8
6	Italy	4	5	5–9	3–8	7–10	9–7	8–5	—	5–6	10–5	7–6	4–11
7	Germany	4	5	4–8	6–7	5–4	4–9	6–8	6–5	—	7–9	7–3	6–4
8	Czech Republic	3	6	3–7	2–8	4–7	4–7	7–8	5–10	9–7	—	10–4	10–5
9	Sweden	2	7	4–9	6–8	7–4	3–6	5–8	6–7	3–7	4–10	—	6–4
10	China	2	7	7–9	3–6	6–8	4–9	8–5	11–4	4–6	5–10	4–6	—

Legend: Blue = home team win; Red = away team win.

==== Playoffs ====
Semifinals
1	Switzerland	5
4	Great Britain	8
2	Canada	5
3	Norway	4

Gold medal game
4	Great Britain	6
2	Canada	9
Bronze medal game
1	Switzerland	9
3	Norway	1

===== Semifinals =====
Thursday, 19 February, 19:35

Sheet B	1	2	3	4	5	6	7	8	9	10	Final
Switzerland (Schwaller) 🔨	0	2	0	2	0	0	1	0	0	0	5
Great Britain (Mouat)	0	0	2	0	1	1	0	2	0	2	8

Player percentages
Switzerland		Great Britain	
Pablo Lachat-Couchepin	88%	Hammy McMillan Jr.	85%
Sven Michel	94%	Bobby Lammie	78%
Yannick Schwaller	83%	Grant Hardie	83%
Benoît Schwarz-van Berkel	72%	Bruce Mouat	85%
Total	84%	Total	83%

Sheet D	1	2	3	4	5	6	7	8	9	10	11	Final
Canada (Jacobs) 🔨	0	1	1	0	0	1	0	0	1	0	1	5
Norway (Ramsfjell)	0	0	0	1	0	0	0	1	0	2	0	4

Player percentages
Canada		Norway	
Ben Hebert	91%	Gaute Nepstad	78%
Brett Gallant	88%	Bendik Ramsfjell	81%
Marc Kennedy	88%	Martin Sesaker	77%
Brad Jacobs	84%	Magnus Ramsfjell	79%
Total	88%	Total	79%

===== Bronze medal game =====
Friday, 20 February, 19:05

Sheet C	1	2	3	4	5	6	7	8	9	10	Final
Switzerland (Schwaller) 🔨	0	3	1	0	0	0	0	2	3	X	9
Norway (Ramsfjell)	0	0	0	0	1	0	0	0	0	X	1

Player percentages
Switzerland		Norway	
Pablo Lachat-Couchepin	89%	Gaute Nepstad	97%
Sven Michel	89%	Bendik Ramsfjell	71%
Yannick Schwaller	88%	Martin Sesaker	76%
Benoît Schwarz-van Berkel	96%	Magnus Ramsfjell	78%
Total	90%	Total	81%

===== Gold medal game =====
Saturday, 21 February, 19:05

Sheet C	1	2	3	4	5	6	7	8	9	10	Final
Great Britain (Mouat)	0	2	0	1	0	2	0	1	0	0	6
Canada (Jacobs) 🔨	1	0	2	0	1	0	1	0	3	1	9

Player percentages
Great Britain		Canada	
Hammy McMillan Jr.	99%	Ben Hebert	98%
Bobby Lammie	75%	Brett Gallant	78%
Grant Hardie	86%	Marc Kennedy	93%
Bruce Mouat	80%	Brad Jacobs	84%
Total	85%	Total	88%

=== Women's tournament ===
==== Round robin ====
Standings

Final Round Robin Standings
Team	Skip	Pld	W	L	W–L	PF	PA	EW	EL	BE	SE	S%	DSC	Qualification
Sweden	Anna Hasselborg	9	7	2	–	65	50	45	32	5	14	81.7%	25.806	Playoffs
United States	Tabitha Peterson	9	6	3	2–0	60	54	40	37	3	13	82.1%	34.288	Playoffs
Switzerland	Silvana Tirinzoni	9	6	3	1–1	60	51	35	42	6	4	85.0%	44.338	Playoffs
Canada	Rachel Homan	9	6	3	0–2	76	59	45	38	2	9	80.3%	19.781	Playoffs
South Korea	Gim Eun-ji	9	5	4	1–0	60	53	37	35	8	11	81.2%	23.581	
Great Britain	Sophie Jackson	9	5	4	0–1	58	58	36	36	10	8	83.4%	16.938	
Denmark	Madeleine Dupont	9	4	5	–	49	58	36	38	3	11	77.0%	37.875	
Japan	Sayaka Yoshimura	9	2	7	1–1	51	69	35	43	3	6	78.6%	27.513	
Italy	Stefania Constantini	9	2	7	1–1	47	60	34	40	3	4	78.8%	34.719	
China	Wang Rui	9	2	7	1–1	56	70	37	39	3	9	82.7%	41.206	

Source: Official website

Results

Women's round robin summary table
Pos	Team	W	L	SWE	USA	SUI	CAN	KOR	GBR	DEN	JPN	ITA	CHN
1	Sweden	7	2	—	9–4	6–4	6–8	3–8	10–7	6–5	8–4	8–6	9–4
2	United States	6	3	4–9	—	7–6	9–8	8–4	7–8	10–3	7–4	2–7	6–5
3	Switzerland	6	3	4–6	6–7	—	8–7	7–5	10–6	6–4	5–7	7–4	7–5
4	Canada	6	3	8–6	8–9	7–8	—	10–7	6–7	10–4	9–6	8–7	10–5
5	South Korea	5	4	8–3	4–8	5–7	7–10	—	9–3	3–6	7–5	7–2	10–9
6	Great Britain	5	4	7–10	8–7	6–10	7–6	3–9	—	7–2	9–3	7–4	4–7
7	Denmark	4	5	5–6	3–10	4–6	4–10	6–3	2–7	—	10–7	7–2	8–7
8	Japan	2	7	4–8	4–7	7–5	6–9	5–7	3–9	7–10	—	6–8	9–6
9	Italy	2	7	6–8	7–2	4–7	7–8	2–7	4–7	2–7	8–6	—	7–8
10	China	2	7	4–9	5–6	5–7	5–10	9–10	7–4	7–8	6–9	8–7	—

Legend: Blue = home team win; Red = away team win.

==== Playoffs ====
Semifinals
1	Sweden	6
4	Canada	3
2	United States	4
3	Switzerland	7

Gold medal game
1	Sweden	6
3	Switzerland	5
Bronze medal game
4	Canada	10
2	United States	7

===== Semifinals =====
Friday, 20 February, 14:05

Sheet B	1	2	3	4	5	6	7	8	9	10	Final
Sweden (Hasselborg) 🔨	1	0	1	0	0	2	1	0	1	X	6
Canada (Homan)	0	1	0	1	0	0	0	1	0	X	3

Player percentages
Sweden		Canada	
Sofia Scharback	89%	Sarah Wilkes	83%
Agnes Knochenhauer	83%	Emma Miskew	74%
Sara McManus	81%	Tracy Fleury	68%
Anna Hasselborg	83%	Rachel Homan	70%
Total	84%	Total	73%

Sheet D	1	2	3	4	5	6	7	8	9	10	Final
United States (Peterson) 🔨	1	0	1	0	1	0	0	0	1	0	4
Switzerland (Tirinzoni)	0	2	0	2	0	0	0	1	0	2	7

Player percentages
United States		Switzerland	
Taylor Anderson-Heide	78%	Selina Witschonke	80%
Tara Peterson	83%	Carole Howald	90%
Cory Thiesse	83%	Silvana Tirinzoni	81%
Tabitha Peterson	83%	Alina Pätz	99%
Total	81%	Total	88%

===== Bronze medal game =====
Saturday, 21 February, 14:05

Sheet C	1	2	3	4	5	6	7	8	9	10	Final
Canada (Homan)	0	1	0	1	0	3	0	3	0	2	10
United States (Peterson) 🔨	1	0	1	0	1	0	2	0	2	0	7

Player percentages
Canada		United States	
Sarah Wilkes	98%	Taylor Anderson-Heide	75%
Emma Miskew	90%	Tara Peterson	81%
Tracy Fleury	91%	Cory Thiesse	84%
Rachel Homan	78%	Tabitha Peterson	76%
Total	89%	Total	79%

===== Gold medal game =====
Sunday, 22 February, 11:05

Sheet C	1	2	3	4	5	6	7	8	9	10	Final
Sweden (Hasselborg) 🔨	2	0	0	0	1	0	1	1	0	1	6
Switzerland (Tirinzoni)	0	0	0	1	0	2	0	0	2	0	5

Player percentages
Sweden		Switzerland	
Sofia Scharback	85%	Selina Witschonke	98%
Agnes Knochenhauer	81%	Carole Howald	75%
Sara McManus	80%	Silvana Tirinzoni	79%
Anna Hasselborg	84%	Alina Pätz	80%
Total	83%	Total	83%

=== Mixed doubles tournament ===
==== Round robin ====
Standings

Final Round Robin Standings
Team	Athletes	Pld	W	L	W–L	PF	PA	EW	EL	BE	SE	S%	DSC	Qualification
Great Britain	Jennifer Dodds / Bruce Mouat	9	8	1	–	69	46	37	30	0	11	79.6%	20.931	Playoffs
Italy	Stefania Constantini / Amos Mosaner	9	6	3	1–0	60	50	32	31	1	11	78.3%	27.931	Playoffs
United States	Cory Thiesse / Korey Dropkin	9	6	3	0–1	58	45	36	33	0	12	83.1%	25.900	Playoffs
Sweden	Isabella Wranå / Rasmus Wranå	9	5	4	–	62	55	31	34	0	9	80.1%	19.413	Playoffs
Canada	Jocelyn Peterman / Brett Gallant	9	4	5	2–0	58	52	35	31	0	10	78.5%	36.050	
Norway	Kristin Skaslien / Magnus Nedregotten	9	4	5	1–1	52	47	37	33	0	12	77.1%	24.444	
Switzerland	Briar Schwaller-Hürlimann / Yannick Schwaller	9	4	5	0–2	56	67	32	35	0	6	74.5%	24.000	
Czech Republic	Julie Zelingrová / Vít Chabičovský	9	3	6	1–0	45	62	30	34	0	6	69.1%	16.019	
South Korea	Kim Seon-yeong / Jeong Yeong-seok	9	3	6	0–1	47	64	32	34	0	9	75.1%	42.425	
Estonia	Marie Kaldvee / Harri Lill	9	2	7	–	46	65	32	39	0	7	71.6%	19.300	

Source: Official website

Results

Mixed doubles round robin summary table
Pos	Team	W	L	GBR	ITA	USA	SWE	CAN	NOR	SUI	CZE	KOR	EST
1	Great Britain	8	1	—	9–6	6–4	7–4	7–5	8–6	6–7	8–7	8–2	10–5
2	Italy	6	3	6–9	—	7–6	4–9	2–7	6–5	12–4	8–2	8–4	7–4
3	United States	6	3	4–6	6–7	—	8–7	7–5	8–6	7–4	8–1	5–6	5–3
4	Sweden	5	4	4–7	9–4	7–8	—	7–6	0–9	13–7	7–4	10–3	5–7
5	Canada	4	5	5–7	7–2	5–7	6–7	—	6–3	8–4	10–5	5–9	6–8
6	Norway	4	5	6–8	5–6	6–8	9–0	3–6	—	6–3	3–6	8–5	6–5
7	Switzerland	4	5	7–6	4–12	4–7	7–13	4–8	3–6	—	10–3	8–5	9–7
8	Czech Republic	3	6	7–8	2–8	1–8	4–7	5–10	6–3	3–10	—	9–4	8–4
9	South Korea	3	6	2–8	4–8	6–5	3–10	9–5	5–8	5–8	4–9	—	9–3
10	Estonia	2	7	5–10	4–7	3–5	7–5	8–6	5–6	7–9	4–8	3–9	—

Source: Official website
Legend: Blue = home team win; Red = away team win.

==== Playoffs ====
Semifinals
1	Great Britain	3
4	Sweden	9
2	Italy	8
3	United States	9

Gold medal game
4	Sweden	6
3	United States	5
Bronze medal game
1	Great Britain	3
2	Italy	5

===== Semifinals =====
Monday, 9 February, 18:05

Sheet B	1	2	3	4	5	6	7	8	Final
Great Britain (Dodds / Mouat) 🔨	1	0	0	1	1	0	0	X	3
Sweden (Wranå / Wranå)	0	2	1	0	0	5	1	X	9

Player percentages
Great Britain		Sweden	
Jennifer Dodds	57%	Isabella Wranå	91%
Bruce Mouat	69%	Rasmus Wranå	92%
Total	64%	Total	91%

Sheet D	1	2	3	4	5	6	7	8	Final
Italy (Constantini / Mosaner) 🔨	2	0	2	0	1	0	3	0	8
United States (Thiesse / Dropkin)	0	2	0	3	0	2	0	2	9

Player percentages
Italy		United States	
Stefania Constantini	75%	Cory Thiesse	92%
Amos Mosaner	74%	Korey Dropkin	85%
Total	74%	Total	88%

===== Bronze medal game =====
Tuesday, 10 February, 14:05

Sheet C	1	2	3	4	5	6	7	8	Final
Great Britain (Dodds / Mouat) 🔨	0	1	0	0	1	0	1	0	3
Italy (Constantini / Mosaner)	1	0	1	1	0	1	0	1	5

Player percentages
Great Britain		Italy	
Jennifer Dodds	77%	Stefania Constantini	92%
Bruce Mouat	88%	Amos Mosaner	89%
Total	84%	Total	90%

===== Gold medal game =====
Tuesday, 10 February, 18:05

Sheet C	1	2	3	4	5	6	7	8	Final
Sweden (Wranå / Wranå)	0	2	0	1	0	1	0	2	6
United States (Thiesse / Dropkin) 🔨	1	0	1	0	1	0	2	0	5

Player percentages
Sweden		United States	
Isabella Wranå	97%	Cory Thiesse	73%
Rasmus Wranå	74%	Korey Dropkin	72%
Total	83%	Total	73%

== Allegations of Canadian delivery violations ==
Both the men's and women's Canadian curling teams were accused of delivery violations, specifically touching the stone after it reached the hog line, and touching the granite surface of the stone rather than just the handle. The women's team had a stone removed during their round-robin loss to Switzerland for double-touching. The WCF decided to position umpires at the hog line to watch for potential violations. After a stone from a British curler was also removed from play for similar reasons, the WCF held a meeting with representative teams where it was decided that umpires would only continue policing the hog line if there was a complaint during a game.
