= List of flag bearers for the Virgin Islands at the Olympics =

Virgin Islands at the Olympics
- Flag of the United States Virgin Islands
- IOC code: ISV
- NOC: Virgin Islands Olympic Committee
- Website: www.virginislandsolympics.com
- Medals: Gold 0 Silver 1 Bronze 0 Total 1

Summer appearances
- 1968; 1972; 1976; 1980; 1984; 1988; 1992; 1996; 2000; 2004; 2008; 2012; 2016; 2020; 2024

Winter appearances
- 1988; 1992; 1994; 1998; 2002; 2006; 2010; 2014; 2018; 2022; 2026

This is a list of flag bearers who have represented Virgin Islands at the Olympics.

Flag bearers carry the national flag of their country at the opening ceremony of the Olympic Games.

#	Event year	Season	Flag bearer	Sport
1	1968	Summer	Liston Sprauve	Weightlifting
2	1972	Summer	William Peets	Boxing
3	1976	Summer	Ivan David	Wrestling
4	1984	Summer	Jodie Lawaetz	Swimming
5	1988	Winter	Seba Johnson	Alpine skiing
6	1988	Summer	Robert Fellner	Taekwondo
7	1992	Winter	Anne Abernathy	Luge
8	1992	Summer	Flora Hyacinth	Athletics
9	1994	Winter	Kyle Heikkila	Luge
10	1996	Summer	Lisa Neuburger	Sailing
11	1998	Winter	Paul Zar	Bobsleigh
12	2000	Summer	Ameerah Bello	Athletics
13	2002	Winter	Dinah Browne	Luge
14	2004	Summer	LaVerne Jones	Athletics
15	2006	Winter	Anne Abernathy	Luge (did not compete)
16	2008	Summer	Josh Laban	Swimming
17	2012	Summer	Tabarie Henry	Athletics
18	2014	Winter	Jasmine Campbell	Alpine skiing
19	2016	Summer	Cy Thompson	Sailing
20	2020	Summer	Natalia Kuipers	Swimming
20	2020	Summer	Adriel Sanes	Swimming
21	2022	Winter	Volunteer	–
22	2024	Summer	Natalia Kuipers	Swimming
22	2024	Summer	Kruz Schembri	Fencing

== See also ==
- Virgin Islands at the Olympics
