= Virgin Islands at the 1992 Summer Olympics =

- Flag of the United States Virgin Islands
- IOC code: ISV
- NOC: Virgin Islands Olympic Committee

in Barcelona
- Competitors: 25 (20 men and 5 women) in 7 sports
- Flag bearer: Flora Hyacinth
- Medals: Gold 0 Silver 0 Bronze 0 Total 0

Summer Olympics appearances (overview)
- 1968; 1972; 1976; 1980; 1984; 1988; 1992; 1996; 2000; 2004; 2008; 2012; 2016; 2020; 2024; 2028

The United States Virgin Islands competed at the 1992 Summer Olympics in Barcelona, Spain. 25 competitors, 20 men and 5 women, took part in 29 events in 7 sports.

== Competitors ==
The following is the list of number of competitors in the Games.

Sport	Men	Women	Total
Athletics	7	3	10
Boxing	3	–	3
Cycling	1	0	1
Equestrian	1	0	1
Sailing	6	1	7
Shooting	1	0	1
Swimming	2	1	3
Total	20	5	25

== Athletics ==
Track and road events
Men

Athlete	Event	Heats		Quarterfinal		Semifinal		Final	
Athlete	Event	Result	Rank	Result	Rank	Result	Rank	Result	Rank
Neville Hodge	100 m	10.71	39	Did not advance					
Wyndell Dickinson	200 m	21.78	54	Did not advance					
Desai Wynter	400 m	DNF		Did not advance					
Marlon Williams	5000 m	15:26.49	52	—N/a				Did not advance	
Marlon Williams	10,000 m	31:22.13	49	—N/a				Did not advance	
Calvin Dallas	Marathon	—N/a						2:38:11	78
Derry Pemberton; Neville Hodge; Mitchell Peters; Wyndell Dickinson	4 × 100 m relay	40.48	19	—N/a		Did not advance			

Women

Athlete	Event	Heats		Quarterfinal		Semifinal		Final	
Athlete	Event	Result	Rank	Result	Rank	Result	Rank	Result	Rank
Ruth Morris	200 m	24.17	32 Q	24.26	32	Did not advance			
Ruth Morris	400 m	54.37	31 q	54.92	32	Did not advance			
Ana Gutiérrez	Marathon	—N/a						3:14:02	35

Field events

Athlete	Event	Qualification		Final	
Athlete	Event	Distance	Position	Distance	Position
Flora Hyacinth	Women's long jump	6.71	7 q	6.52	9

== Boxing ==
Athlete	Event	Round of 32	Round of 16	Quarterfinals	Semifinals	Final	
Athlete	Event	Opposition Result	Opposition Result	Opposition Result	Opposition Result	Opposition Result	Rank
Jacobo Garcia	Lightweight	Bye	Matumla (TAN); L 2–12	Did not advance			
Gilberto Brown	Middleweight	Missaoui (TUN); W 6–4	Hernández (CUB); L 2–13	Did not advance			

== Cycling ==
One male cyclists represented the US Virgin Islands in 1992.

Athlete	Event	Time	Rank
Chesen Frey	Men's road race	DNF	

== Equestrian ==
=== Jumping ===
Athlete	Horse	Event	Qualification								Final					
Athlete	Horse	Event	Round 1		Round 2		Round 3		Total		Round 1		Round 2		Total	
Athlete	Horse	Event	Score	Rank	Score	Rank	Score	Rank	Score	Rank	Penalties	Rank	Penalties	Rank	Penalties	Rank
Charles Holzer	Manassas County	Individual	12.00	76	45.50	42	DNF		57.50	69	Did not advance					

== Sailing ==
Men

Athlete	Event	Race										Net points	Final rank
Athlete	Event	1	2	3	4	5	6	7	8	9	10	Net points	Final rank
James Diaz	Lechner A-390	31	20	26	25	~~36~~	26	25	26	22	36	291.0	30
Mark Elston	Finn	14	22	18	22	14	~~26~~	22	—N/a			148.0	23

Women

Athlete	Event	Race										Net points	Final rank
Athlete	Event	1	2	3	4	5	6	7	8	9	10	Net points	Final rank
Lisa Neuburger	Lechner A-390	20	14	15	9	14	9	9	6	11	~~PMS~~	160.7	13

Open

Athlete	Event	Race							Net points	Final rank
Athlete	Event	1	2	3	4	5	6	7	Net points	Final rank
Jean Braure; Charles M. Shipway	Tornado	~~22~~	21	21	22	22	21	21	164.0	22
John F. Foster; John Foster	Star	23	23	22	~~24~~	24	23	19	170.0	25

== Shooting ==
Athlete	Event	Qualification		Final	
Athlete	Event	Points	Rank	Points	Rank
Bruce Meredith	Men's 50 m rifle prone	591	31	Did not advance	

== Swimming ==
Athlete	Event	Heats		Final A/B	
Athlete	Event	Time	Rank	Time	Rank
Laurent Alfred	Men's 50 m freestyle	24.66	48	Did not advance	
Laurent Alfred	Men's 100 m freestyle	54.89	60	Did not advance	
Laurent Alfred	Men's 200 m freestyle	2:04.59	51	Did not advance	
Kristan Singleton	Men's 100 m butterfly	58.20	50	Did not advance	
Kristan Singleton	Men's 200 m butterfly	2:08.71	39	Did not advance	
Shelley Cramer	Women's 50 m freestyle	27.84	40	Did not advance	
Shelley Cramer	Women's 100 m freestyle	59.99	39	Did not advance	
Shelley Cramer	Women's 100 m butterfly	1:05.84	43	Did not advance	

== See also ==
- Virgin Islands at the 1991 Pan American Games
