= Virgin Islands at the 2011 Pan American Games =

- IOC code: ISV
- NOC: Virgin Islands Olympic Committee
- Website: www.virginislandsolympics.com

in Guadalajara 14–30 October 2011
- Competitors: 16 in 7 sports
- Flag bearer: Hans Lawaetz
- Medals: Gold 0 Silver 0 Bronze 0 Total 0

Pan American Games appearances (overview)
- 1967; 1971; 1975; 1979; 1983; 1987; 1991; 1995; 1999; 2003; 2007; 2011; 2015; 2019; 2023; 2027

The United States Virgin Islands competed at the 2011 Pan American Games held in Guadalajara, Mexico from October 14 to 30, 2011. The Virgin Islands sent sixteen athletes in seven sports to compete. Hans Lawaetz the president of the Virgin Islands Olympic Committee carried the flag during the opening ceremony.

== Athletics ==
The Virgin Islands qualified seven athletes (four male and three female).

=== Men ===
Track and road events

Event	Athletes	Heats		Semifinal		Final	
Event	Athletes	Time	Rank	Time	Rank	Time	Rank
100 m	Adrian Durant	10.64 PB	6th	did not advance			

Field events

Event	Athletes	Semifinal		Final	
Event	Athletes	Result	Rank	Result	Rank
Long Jump	Collister Fahie	7.87 m.	2nd Q	7.46 m.	9th
Long Jump	Leon Hunt	7.31 m.	8th	did not advance	
Triple jump	Muhammad Halim			15.94	9th

=== Women ===
Track and road events

Event	Athletes	Semifinal		Final	
Event	Athletes	Result	Rank	Result	Rank
100 m	Courtney Patterson	11.59	4th	did not advance	
100 m	Laverne Jones-Ferrette	11.45	3rd q	11.60	8th

Heptathlon	Event	Wanetta Kirby		
Heptathlon	Event	Results	Points	Rank
	100 m hurdles	17.99	489	13th
	High jump	1.68 m.	830	6th
	Shot put	8.45 m.	428	13th
	200 m	24.98	889	6th
	Long jump	5.65 m.	744	5th
	Javelin throw	20.78 m.	303	13th
	800 m	2:50.38	460	12th
Final			4143	12th

== Boxing ==
The Virgin Islands have qualified two boxers.

Men

Athlete	Event	Round of 16	Quarterfinals	Semifinals	Final
Athlete	Event	Opposition Result	Opposition Result	Opposition Result	Opposition Result
Clayton Laurent	Super Heavyweight		Gerardo Bisbal (PUR); L 11-20	did not advance	

Women

Athlete	Event	Quarterfinals	Semifinals	Final
Athlete	Event	Opposition Result	Opposition Result	Opposition Result
Tiffany Reddick	Light heavyweight	Yenebier Guillen (DOM); L RSC R1 3:00	did not advance	

== Sailing ==
Virgin Islands qualified 2 boats and 2 athletes.

Men

Athlete	Event	Race											Net Points	Final Rank
Athlete	Event	1	2	3	4	5	6	7	8	9	10	M	Net Points	Final Rank
Cy Thompson	Single-handed Dinghy (Laser)	12	13	12	13	9	(14); DNE	8	9	11	11	/	97.0	12th

Women

Athlete	Event	Race											Net Points	Final Rank
Athlete	Event	1	2	3	4	5	6	7	8	9	10	M	Net Points	Final Rank
Mimi Roller	Single-handed Dinghy (Laser Radial)	8	(10)	7	9	10	3	6	10	7	7	/	67.0	8th

== Shooting ==
The Virgin Islands qualified two shooters.

Men

Event	Athlete	Qualification		Final	
Event	Athlete	Score	Rank	Score	Rank
50 m rifle prone	Ned Gerard	588-29x	6th Q	688.8	6th

Women

Event	Athlete	Qualification		Final	
Event	Athlete	Score	Rank	Score	Rank
10 m air pistol	Karen Noguerira	352- 1x	23rd	did not advance	
25 m pistol	Karen Noguerira	527- 6x	24th	did not advance	

== Swimming ==
The Virgin Islands qualified one swimmer.

Men

Event	Athlete(s)	Heats		Final	
Event	Athlete(s)	Result	Rank	Result	Rank
100 m Freestyle	Branden Whitehurst	52.45	19th	did not advance	
200 m Individual Medley	Branden Whitehurst	2:12.71	11th qB	2:10.89	2nd B

== Taekwondo ==
The Virgin Islands received a wildcard to send one male taekwondo athlete.

Men

Athlete	Event	Round of 16	Quarterfinals	Semifinals	Final
Athlete	Event	Opposition Result	Opposition Result	Opposition Result	Opposition Result
Jahmar Jean-Marie	Middleweight (-80kg)	Stuart Smit (ARU); L 3 – 15	did not advance		

== Triathlon ==
The Virgin Islands qualified one triathlete.

Men

Athlete	Event	Swim (1.5 km)	Trans 1	Bike (40 km)	Trans 2	Run (10 km)	Total	Rank
Morgan Locke	Individual	18:28; 18th	0:29; 36th	1:04:50; 32nd	0:16 =15th	48:49; 34th	2:12:54	34th

== See also ==
- Virgin Islands at the 2012 Summer Olympics
