= Virgin Islands at the 2015 Pan American Games =

- IOC code: ISV
- NOC: Virgin Islands Olympic Committee
- Website: www.virginislandsolympics.com

in Toronto, Canada 10–26 July 2015
- Competitors: 18 in 8 sports
- Flag bearer (opening): Cy Thompson
- Flag bearer (closing): Clayton Laurent
- Medals: Gold 0 Silver 0 Bronze 0 Total 0

Pan American Games appearances (overview)
- 1967; 1971; 1975; 1979; 1983; 1987; 1991; 1995; 1999; 2003; 2007; 2011; 2015; 2019; 2023

The Virgin Islands competed at the 2015 Pan American Games held in Toronto, Canada from July 10 to 26, 2015.

Sailor Cy Thompson was the flagbearer for the team during the opening ceremony.

== Competitors ==
The following table lists Virgin Island's delegation per sport and gender.

Sport	Men	Women	Total
Athletics	3	2	5
Boxing	1	0	1
Fencing	1	0	1
Golf	0	1	1
Sailing	2	2	4
Shooting	1	1	2
Swimming	1	1	2
Taekwondo	1	1	2
Total	10	8	18

== Athletics ==
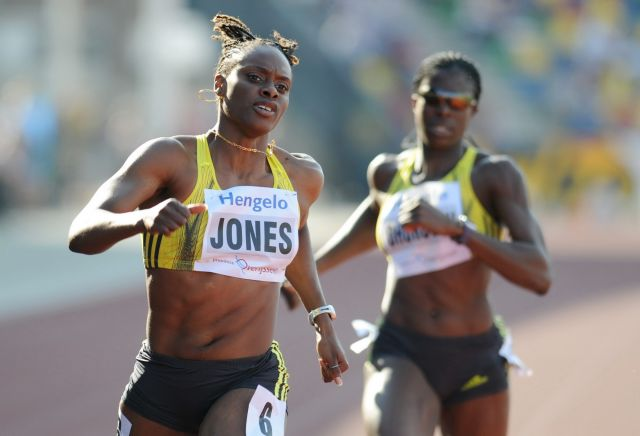
Laverne Jones-Ferrette represented the Virgin Islands in the 100m competition.

The Virgin Islands qualified nine athletes (five male and four female). However, only five were permitted to compete (three men and two women) after the quota had to be reduced.

Key

- Note – Ranks given for track events are for the entire round
- Q = Qualified for the next round
- SB = Seasonal best
- DNF = Did not finish
- N/A = Round not applicable for the event

Men
Track & road events

Athlete(s)	Event	Heat		Semifinal		Final	
Athlete(s)	Event	Result	Rank	Result	Rank	Result	Rank
Eddie Lovett	110 m hurdles	13.65	12	—N/a		did not advance	
Leslie Murray	400 m hurdles	—N/a		DNF		did not advance	

Field events

Athlete(s)	Event	Qualification		Final	
Athlete(s)	Event	Result	Rank	Result	Rank
Leon Hunt	Long jump	7.31	16	did not advance	

Women
Track & road events

Athlete(s)	Event	Heat		Semifinal		Final	
Athlete(s)	Event	Result	Rank	Result	Rank	Result	Rank
Laverne Jones-Ferrette	100 m	11.14	7 Q	11.33	13	did not advance	
Allison Peter	200 m	23.89 SB	20	did not advance			

== Boxing ==
The Virgin Islands qualified one male boxer.

Men

Athlete	Event	Quarterfinals	Semifinals	Final
Athlete	Event	Opposition Result	Opposition Result	Opposition Result
Clayton Laurent	+91kg	Duarte Lima (BRA); L 1–2	did not advance	

== Fencing ==
The Virgin Islands qualified one male fencer.

Men

Athlete	Event	Pool Round		Round of 16	Quarterfinals	Semifinals	Final / BM	
Athlete	Event	Victories	Seed	Opposition Score	Opposition Score	Opposition Score	Opposition Score	Rank
Stryker Weller	Sabre	1	16 Q	Polossifakis (CAN); L 3–15	did not advance			

== Golf ==
The Virgin Islands qualified one female golfer.

Women

Athlete	Event	Final						
Athlete	Event	Round 1	Round 2	Round 3	Round 4	Total	To Par	Rank
Amira Alexander	Individual	79	77	75	72	303	+15	11

== Sailing ==
The Virgin Islands qualified four sailors (three boats).

Athlete	Event	Race																	Net Points	Final Rank
Athlete	Event	1	2	3	4	5	6	7	8	9	10	11	12	13	14	15	16	M*	Net Points	Final Rank
Cy Thompson	Men's laser	5	3	5	12	4	6	3	9	1	3	7	(UFD)	—N/a				8	66	5
Kayla McComb; Mayumi Roller	Women's 49erFX	5	2	4	6	1	3	3	2	4	4	5	(6)	3	3	5	2	10	63	4
Peter Stanton	Open Sunfish	9	9	7	7	(10)	2	5	8	7	3	3	10	—N/a					70	8

== Shooting ==
The Virgin Islands received two wildcards.

Athlete	Event	Qualification		Final	
Athlete	Event	Points	Rank	Points	Rank
Ned Gerard	Men's 50 m rifle prone	608.6	22	did not advance	
Karen Nogueina-Gerard	Women's 25m Pistol	534	21	did not advance	
Karen Nogueina-Gerard	Women's 10m Air Pistol	350	23	did not advance	

== Swimming ==
The Virgin Islands qualified two swimmers.

Key

- Note – Ranks given are for the entire round
- FB = Qualified for the B Final

Athlete	Event	Heat		Final	
Athlete	Event	Time	Rank	Time	Rank
Matthew Mays	Men's 100 m Backstroke	59.15	16 FB	59.14	16
Matthew Mays	Men's 200 m Backstroke	2:08.56	18	did not advance	
Matthew Mays	Men's 200 m Butterfly	2:07.90	16 FB	2:09.74	16
Jamaris Washshah	Women's 50 m Freestyle	27.87	23	did not advance	
Jamaris Washshah	Women's 100 m Freestyle	1:01.68	26	did not advance	
Jamaris Washshah	Women's 100 m Backstroke	1:10.50	19	did not advance	

== Taekwondo ==
The Virgin Islands qualified one male athlete, and also received a wildcard to enter a female athlete.

Athlete	Event	Preliminaries	Quarterfinals	Semifinals	Repechage	Bronze Medal	Final	
Athlete	Event	Opposition Result	Opposition Result	Opposition Result	Opposition Result	Opposition Result	Opposition Result	Rank
Douglas Townsend	Men's +80kg	Elliot (URU); L 2–11	did not advance					
Danese Joseph	Women's +67kg	Ferran (CUB); L 0–12	did not advance					

== See also ==
- Virgin Islands at the 2015 Parapan American Games
- Virgin Islands at the 2016 Summer Olympics
