= Virgin Islands at the 2027 Pan American Games =

- IOC code: ISV
- NOC: Virgin Islands Olympic Committee

in Lima, Peru 2027 – 2027
- Competitors: 1 in 1 sport
- Medals: Gold 0 Silver 0 Bronze 0 Total 0

Pan American Games appearances (overview)
- 1967; 1971; 1975; 1979; 1983; 1987; 1991; 1995; 1999; 2003; 2007; 2011; 2015; 2019; 2023

The United States Virgin Islands, also known as the Virgin Islands, is scheduled to compete at the 2027 Pan American Games in Lima, Peru from July 23 to August 8, 2027. This will be the Virgin Islands's 16th appearance at the Pan American Games, having competed at every edition of the games since 1967.

== Competitors ==
The following is the list of number of competitors (per gender) participating at the games per sport/discipline.

Sport	Men	Women	Total
Fencing	1	0	1
Total	1	0	1

== Fencing ==
The Virgin Islands qualified one male fencer, after he won his event at the 2025 Junior Pan American Games.

Men

Athlete	Event	Pool Round		Round of 16	Quarterfinals	Semifinals	Final	
Athlete	Event	Victories	Seed	Opposition Score	Opposition Score	Opposition Score	Opposition Score	Rank
Kruz Schembri	Individual épée							
