= Virgin Islands at the 1996 Summer Olympics =

- Flag of the United States Virgin Islands
- IOC code: ISV
- NOC: Virgin Islands Olympic Committee
- Website: www.virginislandsolympics.com

in Atlanta
- Competitors: 12 (6 men and 6 women) in 5 sports
- Flag bearer: Lisa Neuburger
- Medals: Gold 0 Silver 0 Bronze 0 Total 0

Summer Olympics appearances (overview)
- 1968; 1972; 1976; 1980; 1984; 1988; 1992; 1996; 2000; 2004; 2008; 2012; 2016; 2020; 2024

The United States Virgin Islands competed at the 1996 Summer Olympics in Atlanta, United States.

== Competitors ==
The following is the list of number of competitors in the Games.

Sport	Men	Women	Total
Athletics	2	5	7
Boxing	1	–	1
Sailing	1	1	2
Shooting	1	0	1
Swimming	1	0	1
Total	6	6	12

== Athletics ==
Men
Track & road events

Athlete	Event	Heat		Quarterfinal		Semifinal		Final	
Athlete	Event	Result	Rank	Result	Rank	Result	Rank	Result	Rank
Mitchell Peters	100 m	11.12	8	did not advance					
Marlon Williams	Marathon	—N/a						2:48.26	108

Women
Track & road events

Athlete	Event	Heat		Quarterfinal		Semifinal		Final	
Athlete	Event	Result	Rank	Result	Rank	Result	Rank	Result	Rank
Ameerah Bello	400 m	53.40	38	did not advance					
Maria Noel; Ameerah Bello; Jilma Patrick; Rochelle Thomas	4 × 100 m relay	46.09	15	did not advance					

Field events

Athlete	Event	Qualification		Final	
Athlete	Event	Distance	Position	Distance	Position
Flora Hyacinth	Long jump	6.85	13	did not advance	

== Boxing ==
Athlete	Event	Round of 32	Round of 16	Quarterfinals	Semifinals	Final	
Athlete	Event	Opposition Result	Opposition Result	Opposition Result	Opposition Result	Opposition Result	Rank
Jacobo Garcia	Light welterweight	David Diaz (USA); L RSC-1	did not advance				

== Sailing ==
Two sailors competed for the Virgin Islands at the Sailing venue in the Atlanta Olympics.

Men

Athlete	Event	Race									Net points	Final rank
Athlete	Event	1	2	3	4	5	6	7	8	9	Net points	Final rank
Paul Stoeken	Mistral	~~28~~	21	~~30~~	21	17	21	19	32	18	145.0	23

Women

Athlete	Event	Race									Net points	Final rank
Athlete	Event	1	2	3	4	5	6	7	8	9	Net points	Final rank
Lisa Neuburger	Mistral	10	12	~~15~~	~~13~~	9	12	12	13	11	79.0	14

== Shooting ==
Men

Athlete	Event	Qualification		Final	
Athlete	Event	Points	Rank	Points	Rank
Bruce Meredith	50 m rifle prone	589	42	did not advance	

== Swimming ==
Men

Athlete	Event	Heat		Final B		Final	
Athlete	Event	Time	Rank	Time	Rank	Time	Rank
Khemo Rivera	50 m freestyle	24.62	53	did not advance			

== See also ==
- Virgin Islands at the 1995 Pan American Games
