= Virgin Islands at the 2012 Summer Olympics =

- Flag of the United States Virgin Islands
- IOC code: ISV
- NOC: Virgin Islands Olympic Committee
- Website: www.virginislandsolympics.com

in London
- Competitors: 7 in 3 sports
- Flag bearers: Tabarie Henry (opening); LaVerne Jones-Ferrette (closing)
- Medals: Gold 0 Silver 0 Bronze 0 Total 0

Summer Olympics appearances (overview)
- 1968; 1972; 1976; 1980; 1984; 1988; 1992; 1996; 2000; 2004; 2008; 2012; 2016; 2020; 2024

The United States Virgin Islands competed at the 2012 Summer Olympics in London, from July 27 to August 12, 2012. This was the nation's eleventh appearance at the Olympics, except the 1980 Summer Olympics in Moscow, because of the United States boycott.

The Virgin Islands Olympic Committee sent a total of 7 athletes to the Games, 4 men and 3 women, to compete in three different sports, tying the record (two athletes and sports less for each) set by Beijing. Two athletes from the Virgin Islands had competed in Beijing, including sprinter and three-time Olympic athlete LaVerne Jones-Ferrette. Track runner and Olympic semi-finalist Tabarie Henry was the nation's flag bearer at the opening ceremony.

Virgin Islands, however, failed to win its first Olympic medal since the 1988 Summer Olympics in Seoul, where sailor Peter Holmberg won the silver for Finn class. Jones-Ferrette, who considered as the nation's medal prospect, nearly missed out of the final rounds in her respective sporting events.

== Athletics ==
Athletes from the Virgin Islands have so far achieved qualifying standards in the following athletics events (up to a maximum of 3 athletes in each event at the 'A' Standard, and 1 at the 'B' Standard):

Key

- Note – Ranks given for track events are within the athlete's heat only
- Q = Qualified for the next round
- q = Qualified for the next round as a fastest loser or, in field events, by position without achieving the qualifying target
- NR = National record
- N/A = Round not applicable for the event
- Bye = Athlete not required to compete in round

Men
Track & road events

Athlete	Event	Heat		Semifinal		Final	
Athlete	Event	Result	Rank	Result	Rank	Result	Rank
Tabarie Henry	400 m	45.43	4 q	45.19	6	did not advance	

Field events

Athlete	Event	Qualification		Final	
Athlete	Event	Distance	Position	Distance	Position
Muhammad Halim	Triple jump	16.39	18	did not advance	

Women
Track & road events

Athlete	Event	Heat		Quarterfinal		Semifinal		Final	
Athlete	Event	Result	Rank	Result	Rank	Result	Rank	Result	Rank
LaVerne Jones-Ferrette	100 m	Bye		11.07 NR	2 Q	11.22	4	did not advance	
LaVerne Jones-Ferrette	200 m	22.64	2 Q	—		22.62	4	did not advance	
Allison Peter	100 m	Bye		11.41	7	did not advance			
Allison Peter	200 m	23.00	4 q	—		23.35	8	did not advance	

== Sailing ==
Men

Athlete	Event	Race											Net points	Final rank
Athlete	Event	1	2	3	4	5	6	7	8	9	10	M*	Net points	Final rank
Cy Thompson	Laser	24	22	32	23	17	21	16	26	~~36~~	22	EL	203	25

Women

Athlete	Event	Race											Net points	Final rank
Athlete	Event	1	2	3	4	5	6	7	8	9	10	M*	Net points	Final rank
Mayumi Roller	Laser Radial	40	~~41~~	40	41	41	22	35	40	35	41	EL	335	40

M = Medal race; EL = Eliminated – did not advance into the medal race;

== Swimming ==
Men

Athlete	Event	Heat		Semifinal		Final	
Athlete	Event	Time	Rank	Time	Rank	Time	Rank
Branden Whitehurst	100 m freestyle	51.04	36	did not advance			

== See also ==
- Virgin Islands at the 2012 Summer Paralympics
- Virgin Islands at the 2011 Pan American Games
