= Virgin Islands at the 2019 Pan American Games =

- IOC code: ISV
- NOC: Virgin Islands Olympic Committee

in Lima, Peru 26 July–11 August, 2019
- Competitors: 29 in 5 sports
- Flag bearer: Eduardo Garcia (opening)
- Medals: Gold 0 Silver 0 Bronze 0 Total 0

Pan American Games appearances (overview)
- 1967; 1971; 1975; 1979; 1983; 1987; 1991; 1995; 1999; 2003; 2007; 2011; 2015; 2019; 2023; 2027

The Virgin Islands competed at the 2019 Pan American Games in Lima, Peru from July 26 to August 11, 2019.

The Virgin Islands team was named in July 2019, with the squad consisting of 29 athletes (14 men and 15 women) competing in five sports. This marked an increase of 11 athletes from four years prior in Toronto.

During the opening ceremony of the games, track and field athlete Eduardo Garcia carried the flag of the country as part of the parade of nations.

== Competitors ==
The following is the list of number of competitors (per gender) participating at the games per sport/discipline.

Sport	Men	Women	Total
Athletics	2	0	2
Basketball	10	11	21
Sailing	0	1	1
Swimming	2	1	3
Volleyball	0	2	2
Total	14	15	29

== Athletics (track and field) ==
The Virgin Islands qualified two male track and field athletes.

Key

- Note–Ranks given for track events are for the entire round
- DNS–Did not start

Track and road events
Men

Athlete	Event	Semifinals		Final	
Athlete	Event	Result	Rank	Result	Rank
Eddie Lovett	110 m hurdles	DNS			
Eduardo Garcia	Marathon	—N/a		2:19:12	12

== Basketball ==
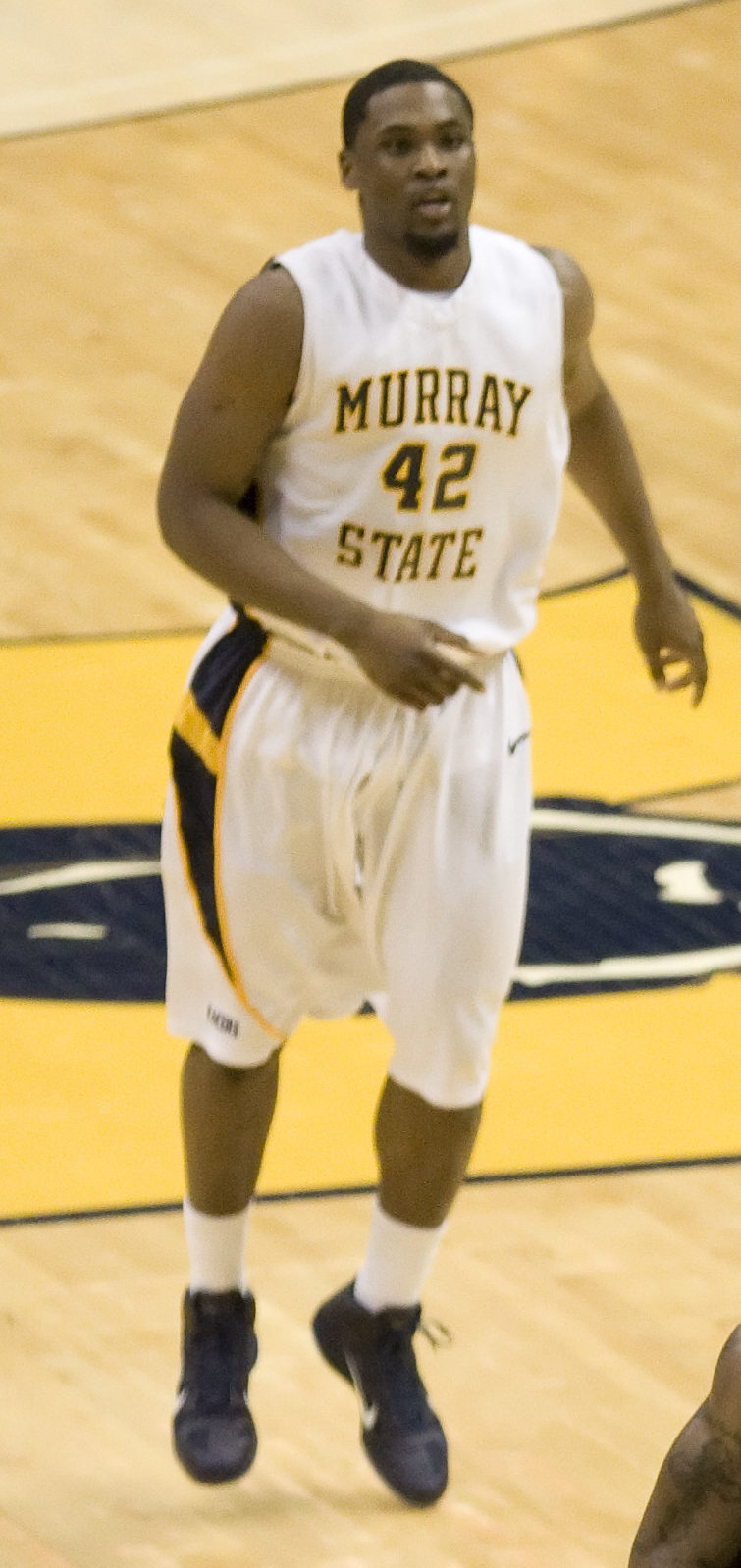
Ivan Aska represented the Virgin Islands in the men's competition

The Virgin Islands qualified both a men's and women's team of 12 athletes each, after both placed in the top 7 of the 2017 FIBA AmeriCup and 2017 FIBA Women's AmeriCup respectively. This will mark the nation's debut in women's basketball at the Pan American Games. The men's team consisted of ten athletes, while the women's had 11, for a total of 21.

=== Men's tournament ===
Roster

U.S. Virgin Islands men's basketball team roster
Players
Coaches

Pos.	No.	Name	Age – Date of birth	Height	Club	Ctr.
F/C	15	Shakeem Alcindor	21 – 20 May 1998	1.52 m (5 ft 0 in)	University of North Texas	(United States)
F	14	Ivan Aska	29 – 26 June 1990	2.07 m (6 ft 9 in)	Seoul SK Knights	(South Korea)
G/F	9	Johnathan Gray	28 – 5 April 1991	1.98 m (6 ft 6 in)
G	8	Khalid Hart (C)	24 – 13 September 1994	1.52 m (5 ft 0 in)	Étoile Charleville-Mézières	(France)
G/F	6	Walter Hodge	32 – 21 September 1986	1.55 m (5 ft 1 in)	CS Sagesse	(Lebanon)
G/F	7	Georgio Milligan	29 – 26 July 1990	1.83 m (6 ft 0 in)	Ostioneros de Guaymas	(Mexico)
G	5	Devon Peltier	32 – 31 May 1987	1.52 m (5 ft 0 in)
F/C	10	Jason Perry-Murray	25 – 3 July 1994	2.04 m (6 ft 8 in)	BC Partizani Tirana	(Albania)
G/F	0	Xavier Richards	26 – 27 October 1992	1.82 m (6 ft 0 in)	Cambelen	(Dominican Republic)
F/C	12	LaRon Smith	25 – 20 December 1993	1.52 m (5 ft 0 in)	BC Yambol	(Bulgaria)

Head coach

- (Puerto Rico) William Colón

Assistant coach(es)

- (United States) Donald Bough

Legend

- (C) Team captain
- Club – describes current club
- Age – describes age
  on 31 July 2019

Group B

Team	Pld	W	L	PF	PA	PD	Pts	Qualification
Puerto Rico	3	3	0	261	237	+24	6	Qualified for the Semifinals
United States	3	2	1	273	224	+49	5	Qualified for the Semifinals
Venezuela	3	1	2	204	227	−23	4	
Virgin Islands	3	0	3	257	307	−50	3	

31 July 2019
10:30

Report

United States	119–84	Virgin Islands
Scoring by quarter: 39–23, 17–20, 35–19, 28–22
Pts: Diallo 20; Rebs: Diallo 11; Asts: Gillespie 3		Pts: Hodge 18; Rebs: Aska 8 Asts: Milligan 8

Coliseo Eduardo Dibos, Lima
Referees: Michael Weiland (CAN)

1 August 2019
10:30

Report

Puerto Rico	101–89	Virgin Islands
Scoring by quarter: 33–11, 26–16, 18–27, 24–35
Pts: Sosa 25; Rebs: Andujar 8 Asts: Collier 3		Pts: Hodge 27; Rebs: Aska 9 Asts: Hodge 5

Coliseo Eduardo Dibos, Lima
Referees: Andréia Silva (BRA)

2 August 2019
18:00

Report

Virgin Islands	84–87	Venezuela
Scoring by quarter: 19–19, 29–20, 15–24, 21–24
Pts: Milligan 22; Rebs: three players 7 Asts: Hodge 3		Pts: Zamora 19; Rebs: Carrera 11; Asts: Vargas 4

Coliseo Eduardo Dibos, Lima
Referees: Michael Weiland (CAN)

Seventh place match

3 August 2019
10:30

Report

Virgin Islands	81–92	Mexico
Scoring by quarter: 13–26, 11–28, 31–12, 26–26
Pts: Hodge 25; Rebs: Perry-Murray 5 Asts: Aska 3		Pts: Camacho 18; Rebs: Gutiérrez 9 Asts: Five players 5

Coliseo Eduardo Dibos, Lima
Referees: Luis Vazquez (PUR)

=== Women's tournament ===
Roster

U.S. Virgin Islands women's basketball team roster
Players
Coaches

Pos.	No.	Name	Age – Date of birth	Height	Club	Ctr.
F	2	Breyanna Roberts	17 – 14 September 2001	1.76 m (5 ft 9 in)
G	4	Brittney Matthew	26 – 8 July 1993	1.70 m (5 ft 7 in)
G	5	Tanecka Carey	28 – 17 August 1990	1.80 m (5 ft 11 in)
G	6	Kadesha Barry	24 – 26 July 1995	1.73 m (5 ft 8 in)
F	7	Natalie Day	29 – 23 July 1990	1.82 m (6 ft 0 in)
G	8	Sedeja Fieulleteau	17 – 6 November 2001	1.76 m (5 ft 9 in)
G	9	Lanese Bough (C)	25 – 7 December 1993	1.79 m (5 ft 10 in)
G/F	10	Victoria Hamilton	28 – 8 July 1991	1.55 m (5 ft 1 in)
F	11	Cheyenne Hedrington	26 – 10 May 1993	1.55 m (5 ft 1 in)
G	12	Imani Tate	24 – 12 July 1995	1.80 m (5 ft 11 in)
F/C	14	Anisha George	21 – 26 May 1998	1.89 m (6 ft 2 in)

Head coach

- (Puerto Rico) William Colón

Assistant coach(es)

- (United States) Clint Williams

Legend

- (C) Team captain
- Club – describes current club
- Age – describes age
  on 6 August 2019

Group B

Team	Pld	W	L	PF	PA	PD	Pts	Qualification
United States	3	3	0	248	180	+68	6	Qualified for the Semifinals
Colombia	3	2	1	152	141	+11	5	Qualified for the Semifinals
Argentina	3	1	2	135	149	−14	3 (Note: Argentina did not receive a point for the forfeit loss to Colombia.)	
Virgin Islands	3	0	3	180	245	−65	3	

Notes:

6 August 2019
18:00

Report

Colombia	69–66	Virgin Islands
Scoring by quarter: 17–21, 16–14, 16–16, 20–15
Pts: Arias 21; Rebs: Mosquera 18; Asts: Palacio 5		Pts: Day 23; Rebs: Day 15; Asts: three players 2

Coliseo Eduardo Dibos, Lima
Referees: Jorge Vázquez (PUR)

7 August 2019
18:00

Report

Virgin Islands	55–103	United States
Scoring by quarter: 10–34, 11–21, 13–23, 21–25
Pts: Day 20; Rebs: George 6 Asts: Day 3		Pts: Mikesell 16; Rebs: P. Williams, Onyenwere 6 Asts: K. Williams 6

Coliseo Eduardo Dibos, Lima
Referees: Andrés Bartel (URU)

8 August 2019
10:30

Report

Argentina	73–59	Virgin Islands
Scoring by quarter: 19–19, 19–11, 17–18, 18–11
Pts: Llorente 19; Rebs: Llorente 8 Asts: Gretter 5		Pts: George 32; Rebs: George 14; Asts: Tate 3

Coliseo Eduardo Dibos, Lima
Referees: Jorge Vázquez (PUR)

Seventh place match

9 August 2019
10:30

Report

Paraguay	69–61	Virgin Islands
Scoring by quarter: 23–14, 12–15, 19–22, 15–10
Pts: Ferrari 28; Rebs: Ferrari 6 Asts: Ferrari 7		Pts: George 19; Rebs: George 13; Asts: Tate 5

Coliseo Eduardo Dibos, Lima
Referees: Andréia Silva (BRA)

== Sailing ==
The Virgin Islands received a universality spot in the women's laser radial event.

Athlete	Event	Race											Net points	Final rank
Athlete	Event	1	2	3	4	5	6	7	8	9	10	M	Net points	Final rank
Mayumi Roller	Women's laser radial	10	10	12	14	17	10	17	16	12	17	Did not advance	118	14

== Swimming ==
The Virgin Islands qualified three swimmers (two men and one woman).

Key

- Note – Ranks given are for the entire round
- QB – Qualified for the B final

Athlete	Event	Heat		Final	
Athlete	Event	Time	Rank	Time	Rank
Matthew Mays	Men's 100 m backstroke	59.04	19	Did not advance	
Matthew Mays	Men's 200 m backstroke	2:08.00	18	Did not advance	
Matthew Mays	Men's 200 m butterfly	2:07.41	20	Did not advance	
Adriel Sanes	Men's 50 m freestyle	23.54	20	Did not advance	
Adriel Sanes	Men's 100 m breaststroke	1:03.03	17	Did not advance	
Adriel Sanes	Men's 200 m breaststroke	2:17.56	12 QB	2:16.40	11
Adriel Sanes	Men's 100 m butterfly	56.46	21	Did not advance	
Adriel Sanes	Men's 200 m individual medley	2:07.15	16 QB	2:06.90	12
Natalia Kuipers	Women's 200 m freestyle	2:16.80	22	Did not advance	
Natalia Kuipers	Women's 800 m freestyle	—N/a		9:46.26	14
Natalia Kuipers	Women's 200 m butterfly	2:32.49	15 QB	2:32.07	15

== Volleyball ==
=== Beach ===
The Virgin Islands qualified a women's pair.

Athletes	Event	Preliminary Round				13th-16th place	15th place	Rank
Athletes	Event	Opposition Score	Opposition Score	Opposition Score	Rank	Opposition Score	Opposition Score	Rank
Mannika Charles; Melanie Valenciana	Women's	Horta / Lavalle (BRA); L 0–2 (8–21, 7–21)	Orellana / Revuelta (MEX); L 0–2 (12–21, 12–21)	Mardones / Rivas (CHI); L 0–2 (15–21, 10–21)	4	Davidson / Grant (TRI); L 0–2 (8–21, 10–21)	Alvarado / Bethancourt (GUA); L 0–2 (17–21, 8–21)	16

== See also ==
- Virgin Islands at the 2020 Summer Olympics
