= Virgin Islands at the 2016 Summer Olympics =

- Flag of the United States Virgin Islands
- IOC code: ISV
- NOC: Virgin Islands Olympic Committee
- Website: www.virginislandsolympics.com

in Rio de Janeiro
- Competitors: 7 in 4 sports
- Flag bearer: Cy Thompson
- Medals: Gold 0 Silver 0 Bronze 0 Total 0

Summer Olympics appearances (overview)
- 1968; 1972; 1976; 1980; 1984; 1988; 1992; 1996; 2000; 2004; 2008; 2012; 2016; 2020; 2024; 2028

Virgin Islands, also known as the United States Virgin Islands and officially as the Virgin Islands of the United States, competed at the 2016 Summer Olympics in Rio de Janeiro, Brazil, from 5 to 21 August 2016. This was the territory's twelfth appearance at the Summer Olympics.

The Virgin Islands Olympic Committee selected a team of seven athletes, five men and two women, to compete in four different sports at the Games. This was the same number of athletes and one more sport than at London in 2012.

Three of the athletes had also competed four years earlier, including triple jumper Muhammad Halim and sprinter LaVerne Jones-Ferrette, who headed to her fourth straight Games as the oldest and most experienced member (aged 35) of the team. Laser sailor and Pan American Games finalist Cy Thompson led his delegation as the flag bearer for the Virgin Islands in the opening ceremony.

The US Virgin Islands, however, failed to win a single Olympic medal in Rio de Janeiro. The nation's previous medal feat happened at the 1988 Summer Olympics in Seoul, where sailor Peter Holmberg bagged the silver in the Finn class.

== Athletics (track and field) ==
Athletes from the Virgin Islands achieved qualifying standards in the following athletics events (up to a maximum of 3 athletes in each event):

Key

- Note–Ranks given for track events are within the athlete's heat only
- Q = Qualified for the next round
- q = Qualified for the next round as a fastest loser or, in field events, by position without achieving the qualifying target
- NR = National record
- N/A = Round not applicable for the event
- Bye = Athlete not required to compete in round
- NM = No mark

Track & road events

Athlete	Event	Heat		Semifinal		Final	
Athlete	Event	Result	Rank	Result	Rank	Result	Rank
Eddie Lovett	Men's 110 m hurdles	13.77	7	Did not advance			
LaVerne Jones-Ferrette	Women's 200 m	23.35	6	Did not advance			

Field events

Athlete	Event	Qualification		Final	
Athlete	Event	Distance	Position	Distance	Position
Muhammad Halim	Men's triple jump	NM	—	Did not advance	

== Boxing ==
Virgin Islands entered one boxer to compete in the Olympic boxing tournament in the men's super heavyweight division. Clayton Laurent claimed his Olympic spot with a box-off victory at the 2016 American Qualification Tournament in Buenos Aires, Argentina.

Athlete	Event	Round of 32	Round of 16	Quarterfinals	Semifinals	Final	
Athlete	Event	Opposition Result	Opposition Result	Opposition Result	Opposition Result	Opposition Result	Rank
Clayton Laurent	Men's super heavyweight	Pfeifer (GER); W 2–1	Yoka (FRA); L 0–3	Did not advance			

== Sailing ==
Sailors from the Virgin Islands qualified one boat in each of the following classes through the 2014 ISAF Sailing World Championships, the individual fleet Worlds, and North American qualifying regattas.

Athlete	Event	Race											Net points	Final rank
Athlete	Event	1	2	3	4	5	6	7	8	9	10	M*	Net points	Final rank
Cy Thompson	Men's Laser	13	4	11	~~35~~	32	33	6	20	17	16	EL	152	19

M = Medal race; EL = Eliminated – did not advance into the medal race

== Swimming ==
Virgin Islands received a Universality invitation from FINA to send two swimmers (one male and one female) to the Olympics.

Athlete	Event	Heat		Semifinal		Final	
Athlete	Event	Time	Rank	Time	Rank	Time	Rank
Rexford Tullius	Men's 200 m backstroke	1:59.14	20	Did not advance			
Caylee Watson	Women's 100 m backstroke	1:07.19	30	Did not advance			

== See also ==
- Virgin Islands at the 2015 Pan American Games
