= Virgin Islands at the 2000 Summer Olympics =

- Flag of the United States Virgin Islands
- IOC code: ISV
- NOC: Virgin Islands Olympic Committee
- Website: www.virginislandsolympics.com

in Sydney
- Competitors: 9 (6 men and 3 women) in 5 sports
- Flag bearer: Ameerah Bello
- Medals: Gold 0 Silver 0 Bronze 0 Total 0

Summer Olympics appearances (overview)
- 1968; 1972; 1976; 1980; 1984; 1988; 1992; 1996; 2000; 2004; 2008; 2012; 2016; 2020; 2024

The United States Virgin Islands was represented at the 2000 Summer Olympics in Sydney, New South Wales, Australia by the Virgin Islands Olympic Committee.

In total, nine athletes including six men and three women represented the United States Virgin Islands in five different sports including athletics, equestrian, sailing, shooting and swimming.

== Competitors ==
In total, nine athletes represented the United States Virgin Islands at the 2000 Summer Olympics in Sydney, New South Wales, Australia across five different sports.

Sport	Men	Women	Total
Athletics	1	2	3
Equestrian	0	1	1
Sailing	2	0	2
Shooting	2	0	2
Swimming	1	0	1
Total	6	3	9

== Athletics ==
In total, three United States Virgin Islander athletes participated in the athletics events – Ameerah Bello in the women's 100 m and the women's 200 m, Flora Hyacinth in the women's long jump and Jeff Jackson in the men's 110 m hurdles.

The heats for the women's 100 m took place on 22 September 2000. Bello finished fifth in her heat in a time of 11.64 seconds. She did not advance to the quarter-finals.

The heats for the men's 110 m hurdles took place on 24 September 2000. Jackson finished sixth in his heat in a time of 14.05 seconds as he advanced to the quarter-finals as one of the fastest losers. The quarter-finals took place later the same day. Jackson finished eighth in his quarter-final in a time of 14.17 seconds. He did not advance to the semi-finals.

The heats for the women's 200 m took place on 27 September 2000. Bello did not start her heat.

The qualifying round for the women's long jump took place on 27 September 2000. Hyacinth contested qualifying group A. Her best jump of 6.08 m saw her ranked 17th in her qualifying group. She did not advance to the final and finished 32nd overall.

Track and road events

Athlete	Event	Heat		Quarterfinal		Semifinal		Final	
Athlete	Event	Result	Rank	Result	Rank	Result	Rank	Result	Rank
Jeff Jackson	Men's 110 m hurdles	14.05	31 q	14.17	31	did not advance			
Ameerah Bello	Women's 100 m	11.64	45	did not advance					
Ameerah Bello	Women's 200 m	DNS		did not advance					

Field events

Athlete	Event	Qualification		Final	
Athlete	Event	Distance	Position	Distance	Position
Flora Hyacinth	Women's long jump	6.08	32	did not advance	

== Equestrian ==
In total, one United States Virgin Islander athlete participated in the equestrian events – Gigi Hewitt in the individual jumping.

The qualifying round for the individual jumping took place from 25–28 September 2000. Hewitt completed rounds one and two but did not finish round three. She ended with total faults of 100.5 and did not advance to the final, finishing 69th overall.

Athlete	Horse	Event	Qualification								Final					Total	
Athlete	Horse	Event	Round 1		Round 2			Round 3			Round A		Round B			Total	
Athlete	Horse	Event	Penalties	Rank	Penalties	Total	Rank	Penalties	Total	Rank	Penalties	Rank	Penalties	Total	Rank	Penalties	Rank
Gigi Hewitt	Genevieve	Individual	24.0	63Q	16.00	40.00	66Q	RT	100.50	69	did not advance					100.50	69

== Sailing ==
In total, two United States Virgin Islander athletes participated in the sailing events – Ben Beer in the finn and Paul Stoeken in the men's mistral.

The 11 races in the men's mistral competition took place from 17–24 September 2000. Stoeken achieved his best result in race 11 finishing 21st. Overall, he finished with a net 236 points and placed 32nd.

The 11 races in the finn competition took place from 23–30 September 2000. Beer achieved his best result in race four finishing 13th. Overall, he finished with a net 185 points and placed 24th.

Athlete	Event	Race											Net points	Final rank
Athlete	Event	1	2	3	4	5	6	7	8	9	10	M*	Net points	Final rank
Paul Stoeken	Mistral	23	27	~~37~~	31	~~32~~	30	24	28	27	25	21	236	32
Ben Beer	Finn	20	24	22	13	21	20	~~26~~	~~26~~	23	22	20	185	24

== Shooting ==
In total, two United States Virgin Islander athletes participated in the shooting events – Bruce Meredith in the men's 50 m rifle prone and Chris Rice in the men's 50 m pistol and the men's 10 m air pistol.

The men's 10 m air pistol took place on 16 September 2000. In the preliminary round, Rice scored 560 across the six rounds. He did not advance to the final and finished 39th overall.

The men's 50 m pistol took place on 19 September 2000. In the preliminary round, Rice scored 548 across the six rounds. He did not advance to the final and finished joint 27th overall.

The men's 50 m rifle prone took place on 21 September 2000. In the preliminary round, Meredith scored 584 across the six rounds. He did not advance to the final and finished 46th overall.

Athlete	Event	Qualification		Final	
Athlete	Event	Points	Rank	Points	Rank
Bruce Meredith	50 m rifle prone	584	46	did not advance	
Chris Rice	50 m pistol	548	27	did not advance	
Chris Rice	10 m air pistol	560	39	did not advance	

== Swimming ==
In total, one United States Virgin Islander athlete participated in the swimming events – George Gleason in the men's 100 m freestyle, the men's 200 m freestyle and the men's 200 m individual medley.

The heats for the men's 200 m freestyle took place on 17 September 2000. Gleason finished third in his heat in a time of one minute 54.64 seconds which was ultimately not fast enough to advance to the semi-finals.

The heats for the men's 100 m freestyle took place on 19 September 2000. Gleason finished third in his heat in a time of 52 seconds which was ultimately not fast enough to advance to the semi-finals.

The heats for the men's 200 m individual medley took place on 20 September 2000. Gleason finished second in his heat in a time of two minutes 8.25 seconds which was ultimately not fast enough to advance to the semi-finals.

Athlete	Event	Heat		Semifinal		Final	
Athlete	Event	Time	Rank	Time	Rank	Time	Rank
George Gleason	100 m freestyle	52.00	42	did not advance			
George Gleason	200 m freestyle	1:54.64	39	did not advance			
George Gleason	200 m individual medley	2:08.25	42	did not advance			

== See also ==
- Virgin Islands at the 1999 Pan American Games
