= Virgin Islands at the Olympics =

- Flag of the United States Virgin Islands
- IOC code: ISV
- NOC: Virgin Islands Olympic Committee
- Website: www.virginislandsolympics.com
- Medals Ranked 137th: Gold 0 Silver 1 Bronze 0 Total 1

Summer appearances
- 1968; 1972; 1976; 1980; 1984; 1988; 1992; 1996; 2000; 2004; 2008; 2012; 2016; 2020; 2024

Winter appearances
- 1988; 1992; 1994; 1998; 2002; 2006; 2010; 2014; 2018; 2022; 2026

The United States Virgin Islands first competed at the Olympic Games in 1968, and have since sent athletes to compete at every Summer Olympic Games except in 1980, when they took part in the boycott of the Moscow Games. They have also participated in 8 Winter Olympic Games since 1988, having missed the 2010, 2018 and 2026 Winter Olympics. The only Olympic medal won by a Virgin Islander was a silver by Peter Holmberg in sailing at the 1988 Summer Olympics.

The Virgin Islands Olympic Committee was formed in 1967 and recognized by the International Olympic Committee the same year.

== Medal tables ==
=== Medals by Summer Games ===
| Games | Athletes | Gold | Silver | Bronze | Total | Rank |
| 1968 Mexico City | 1 | 0 | 0 | 0 | 0 | – |
| 1972 Munich | 1 | 0 | 0 | 0 | 0 | – |
| 1976 Montreal | 1 | 0 | 0 | 0 | 0 | – |
| 1980 Moscow | boycotted | | | | | |
| 1984 Los Angeles | 10 | 0 | 0 | 0 | 0 | – |
| 1988 Seoul | 12 | 0 | 1 | 0 | 1 | 36 |
| 1992 Barcelona | 6 | 0 | 0 | 0 | 0 | – |
| 1996 Atlanta | 2 | 0 | 0 | 0 | 0 | – |
| 2000 Sydney | 6 | 0 | 0 | 0 | 0 | – |
| 2004 Athens | 7 | 0 | 0 | 0 | 0 | – |
| 2008 Beijing | 5 | 0 | 0 | 0 | 0 | – |
| 2012 London | 7 | 0 | 0 | 0 | 0 | – |
| 2016 Rio de Janeiro | 7 | 0 | 0 | 0 | 0 | – |
| 2020 Tokyo | 4 | 0 | 0 | 0 | 0 | – |
| 2024 Paris | 5 | 0 | 0 | 0 | 0 | – |
| 2028 Los Angeles | future event | | | | | |
| 2032 Brisbane | future event | | | | | |
| Total | | 0 | 1 | 0 | 1 | 137 |

=== Medals by Winter Games ===
| Games | Athletes | Gold | Silver | Bronze | Total | Rank |
| 1988 Calgary | 6 | 0 | 0 | 0 | 0 | – |
| 1992 Albertville | 12 | 0 | 0 | 0 | 0 | – |
| 1994 Lillehammer | 8 | 0 | 0 | 0 | 0 | – |
| 1998 Nagano | 7 | 0 | 0 | 0 | 0 | – |
| 2002 Salt Lake City | 8 | 0 | 0 | 0 | 0 | – |
| 2006 Turin | 1 | 0 | 0 | 0 | 0 | – |
| 2010 Vancouver | did not participate | | | | | |
| 2014 Sochi | 1 | 0 | 0 | 0 | 0 | – |
| 2018 Pyeongchang | did not participate | | | | | |
| 2022 Beijing | 1 | 0 | 0 | 0 | 0 | – |
| 2026 Milano Cortina | did not participate | | | | | |
| 2030 French Alps | future event | | | | | |
| 2034 Utah | future event | | | | | |
| Total | | 0 | 0 | 0 | 0 | – |

=== Medals by summer sport ===
| Sport | Gold | Silver | Bronze | Total |
|---|---|---|---|---|
| Sailing | 0 | 1 | 0 | 1 |
| Totals (1 entries) | 0 | 1 | 0 | 1 |

== List of medalists ==
| Medal | Name | Games | Sport | Event |
|---|---|---|---|---|
| Silver | Peter Holmberg | 1988 Seoul | Sailing | Finn |

== See also ==
- Tropical nations at the Winter Olympics
- List of flag bearers for the Virgin Islands at the Olympics
- Virgin Islands at the Paralympics
- Virgin Islands at the Pan American Games
