= Archery at the 2023 Pan American Games – Mixed team recurve =

Mixed team recurve at the 2023 Pan American Games
- Venue: Archery Center
- Dates: November 1, November 3, November 5
- Competitors: 30 from 15 nations

Medalists
Gold medal	Casey Kaufhold; Brady Ellison	United States
Silver medal	Ana Clara Machado; Marcus D'Almeida	Brazil
Bronze medal	Matías Grande; Alejandra Valencia	Mexico

The mixed team recurve competition of the archery events at the 2023 Pan American Games was held on November 1, 3 and 5, at the Archery Center in Santiago, Chile.

== Schedule ==
Date	Time	Round
November 1, 2023	09:00	Ranking Round
November 1, 2023	09:00	Round of 16
November 1, 2023	11:20	Quarterfinals
November 5, 2023	09:30	Semifinals
November 5, 2023	11:15	Final

== Results ==
=== Ranking round ===
The results were as follows:

Rank	Archer	Nation	Score	Note
1	Casey Kaufhold; Brady Ellison	United States	1359	
2	Matias Grande; Alejandra Valencia	Mexico	1358	
3	Ana Clara Machado; Marcus D'Almeida	Brazil	1336	
4	Jorge Enríquez; Ana Rendón	Colombia	1334	
5	Virginie Chénier; Eric Peters	Canada	1320	
6	Florencia Leithold; Damián Jajarabilla	Argentina	1306	
7	Ricardo Soto; Javiera Andrades	Chile	1297	
8	Juan Santiesteban; Larissa Pagan	Cuba	1253	
9	Anne Abernathy; Nicholas D'Amour	Virgin Islands	1248	
10	Nancy Enríquez; Thomas Fossbach	Independent Athletes Team	1241	
11	Víctor Palacio; Nieves Arango	Venezuela	1224	
12	Adrian Muñoz; Nilka Cotto	Puerto Rico	1205	
13	Adriana Espinoza; Lester Ortegón	Ecuador	1201	
14	Alexandra Zavala; Daniel Velarde	Peru	1194	
15	Oscar Ticas; Marcela Cortez	El Salvador	1107	

=== Elimination rounds ===
The results were as follows

Round of 16
9	A Abernathy (ISV); N D'Amour (ISV)	32	35	33
8	J Santiesteban (CUB); L Pagan (CUB)	36	36	33
5	V Chénier (CAN); E Peters (CAN)	37	35	37
12	A Muñoz (PUR); N Cotto (PUR)	33	33	34
13	A Espinoza (ECU); L Ortegón (ECU)	34	36	36	32
4	J Enríquez (COL); A Rendón (COL)	36	38	35	34
3	A Machado (BRA); M D'Almeida (BRA)	32	36	37
14	A Zavala (PER); D Velarde (PER)	29	33	33
11	V Palacio (VEN); N Arango (VEN)	34	34	33
6	F Leithold (ARG); D Jajarabilla (ARG)	34	35	34
10	R Soto (CHI); J Andrades (CHI)	31	37	36	35
7	N Enríquez (EAI); T Fossbach (EAI)	34	36	37	36
15	O Ticas (ESA); M Cortez (ESA)	33	30	34
2	M Grande (MEX); A Valencia (MEX)	37	39	35

Quarterfinals
1	C Kaufhold (USA); B Ellison (USA)	36	38	37	36
8	J Santiesteban (CUB); L Pagan (CUB)	33	39	35	33
5	V Chénier (CAN); E Peters (CAN)	34	28	36	36
4	J Enríquez (COL); A Rendón (COL)	36	35	37	37
3	A Machado (BRA); M D'Almeida (BRA)	33	34	36	36
6	F Leithold (ARG); D Jajarabilla (ARG)	33	32	36	31
10	N Enríquez (EAI); T Fossbach (EAI)	34	33	35	37
2	M Grande (MEX); A Valencia (MEX)	34	37	35	37

Semifinals
1	C Kaufhold (USA); B Ellison (USA)	37	38	40	37
4	J Enríquez (COL); A Rendón (COL)	38	38	39	36
3	A Machado (BRA); M D'Almeida (BRA)	35	39	38	39
2	M Grande (MEX); A Valencia (MEX)	40	35	37	37

Final
1	C Kaufhold (USA); B Ellison (USA)	40	38	35	39
3	A Machado (BRA); M D'Almeida (BRA)	37	37	38	32
Bronze medal match
4	J Enríquez (COL); A Rendón (COL)	37	38	39	38
2	M Grande (MEX); A Valencia (MEX)	39	35	39	40
