= Sailing at the 2011 Pan American Games – Laser Radial =

Women's Laser Radial class at the 2011 Pan American Games
- Venue: Vallarta Yacht Club
- Dates: October 17 - October 23
- Competitors: 13 from 13 nations

Medalists
| Gold medal | Cecilia Saroli | Argentina |
| Silver medal | Tania Calles | Mexico |
| Bronze medal | Paige Railey | United States |

The women's Laser Radial class competition of the sailing events at the 2011 Pan American Games in Guadalajara were held from October 17 to October 23 at the Vallarta Yacht Club in Puerto Vallarta. The defending champion was Paige Railey of the United States.

Points were assigned based on the finishing position in each race (1 for first, 2 for second, etc.). The points were totaled from the top 9 results of the first 10 races, with lower totals being better. If a sailor was disqualified or did not complete the race, 14 points were assigned for that race (as there were 13 sailors in this competition). The top 5 sailors at that point competed in the final race, with placings counting double for final score. The sailor with the lowest total score won.

== Schedule ==
All times are Central Standard Time (UTC-6).

| Date | Time | Round |
|---|---|---|
| October 17, 2011 | 13:00 | 1 and 2 races |
| October 18, 2011 | 13:00 | 3 and 4 races |
| October 19, 2011 | 13:00 | 5 and 6 races |
| October 21, 2011 | 13:00 | 7 and 8 races |
| October 22, 2011 | 13:00 | 9 and 10 races |
| October 23, 2011 | 14:27 | Medal race |

== Results ==
Race M is the medal race in which only the top 5 competitors took part. Each boat can drop its lowest result provided that all ten races are completed. If less than ten races are completed all races will count. Boats cannot drop their result in the medal race.

| Rank | Athlete | Race | | | | | | | | | | | Total Points | Net Points |
| Rank | Athlete | 1 | 2 | 3 | 4 | 5 | 6 | 7 | 8 | 9 | 10 | M | Total Points | Net Points |
|---|---|---|---|---|---|---|---|---|---|---|---|---|---|---|
| 1st place, gold medalist(s) | Cecilia Carranza (ARG) | 2 | 3 | 1 | 1 | 1 | (5) | 3 | 2 | 1 | 3 | 6 | 30 | 25 |
| 2nd place, silver medalist(s) | Tania Calles (MEX) | 1 | 2 | 2 | 2 | (8) | 7 | 2 | 3 | 2 | 4 | 8 | 39 | 31 |
| 3rd place, bronze medalist(s) | Paige Railey (USA) | 5 | 1 | (11) | 3 | 9 | 1 | 1 | 1 | 3 | 1 | 10 | 45 | 35 |
| 4 | Isabella Bertold (CAN) | 3 | 5 | 3 | 4 | 3 | 6 | (11) | 4 | 5 | 2 | 4 | 50 | 39 |
| 5 | Philipine van Aanholt (AHO) | 11 | 8 | (14); DSQ | 6 | 4 | 2 | 10 | 7 | 8 | 5 | 2 | 77 | 63 |
| 6 | Daniela Rivera (VEN) | 6 | 9 | 4 | 5 | (12) | 8 | 9 | 5 | 9 | 6 | | 73 | 61 |
| 7 | Paloma Schmidt (PER) | 9 | (13) | 10 | 8 | 6 | 4 | 4 | 12 | 4 | 9 | | 79 | 66 |
| 8 | Mayumi Roller (ISV) | 8 | (10) | 7 | 9 | 10 | 3 | 6 | 10 | 7 | 7 | | 77 | 67 |
| 9 | Andrea Foglia (URU) | 10 | 7 | 5 | 7 | 7 | (11) | 8 | 6 | 10 | 8 | | 79 | 68 |
| 10 | Andrea Aldana (GUA) | (12) | 6 | 9 | 12 | 5 | 12 | 5 | 8 | 11 | 11 | | 91 | 79 |
| 11 | Adriana Kostiw (BRA) | 4 | 4 | 12 | 10 | 12 | 9 | (13) | 9 | 12 | 12 | | 96 | 83 |
| 12 | Francisca Gumucio (CHI) | 7 | 11 | 6 | 13 | (14); DSQ | 10 | 7 | 11 | 14; OCS | 10 | | 103 | 89 |
| 13 | Ariana Villena (ECU) | (13) | 12 | 8 | 11 | 2 | 13 | 12 | 13 | 6 | 13 | | 103 | 90 |
