= Virgin Islands at the 2008 Summer Olympics =

- Flag of the United States Virgin Islands
- IOC code: ISV
- NOC: Virgin Islands Olympic Committee
- Website: www.virginislandsolympics.com

in Beijing
- Competitors: 7 in 5 sports
- Flag bearer: Joshua Laban
- Medals: Gold 0 Silver 0 Bronze 0 Total 0

Summer Olympics appearances (overview)
- 1968; 1972; 1976; 1980; 1984; 1988; 1992; 1996; 2000; 2004; 2008; 2012; 2016; 2020; 2024; 2028

The United States Virgin Islands competed in the 2008 Summer Olympics, which were held in Beijing, the People's Republic of China from August 8 to August 24, 2008. The appearance of its 23-person delegation marked its fifteenth appearance at the Olympic games, and its tenth appearance at the Summer Olympic games. In total, seven athletes participated on behalf of the Virgin Islands (Tabarie Henry and LaVerne Jones-Ferrette in track and field, John and Julius Jackson in boxing, Thomas Barrows III in sailing, Ned Gerard in shooting, and Josh Laban in swimming) in Beijing. Of those, John Jackson and Tabarie Henry progressed to a post-preliminary event, and Henry reached semifinals in his own. There were no Virgin Islander medalists at the Beijing Olympics.

== Background ==
Between its beginning and the Beijing Olympics, the United States Virgin Islands have participated in fifteen Olympic Games, including five Winter Olympics. Of the ten Summer Olympic games, the Virgin Islands have sent a delegation for every game since the 1968 Summer Olympics in Mexico City excluding the 1980 Summer Olympics in Moscow. The first women in the team participated at the 1976 Summer Olympics in Montréal, and the delegation has included women ever since, peaking at the 1996 Summer Olympics in Atlanta. The size of its summer Olympic team was largest between 1972 (16 athletes) and 1992 (25 athletes), and was at its all-time largest in the 1984 Summer Olympics in Los Angeles when 29 athletes competed for the country. After 1996, the team carried 15 athletes or less.

In its entire history up to Beijing, there has been one medalist: Peter Holmberg, who medaled silver in the 1988 Summer Olympics in Seoul. Seven Virgin Islanders participated in the Beijing games, including five men and one woman in five distinct sports. There were no medalists, although boxer John Jackson and runner Tabarie Henry progressed to post-preliminary rounds. Josh Laban was the nation's flag bearer during ceremonies.

The Virgin Islands' delegation to Beijing included five executives (among them, Virgin Islands Olympic Committee President Hans Lawaetz); the seven Olympians, along with nine assisting staff (coaches, etc.); and two youth camp athletes. Overall, 23 people composed the team.

== Athletics ==
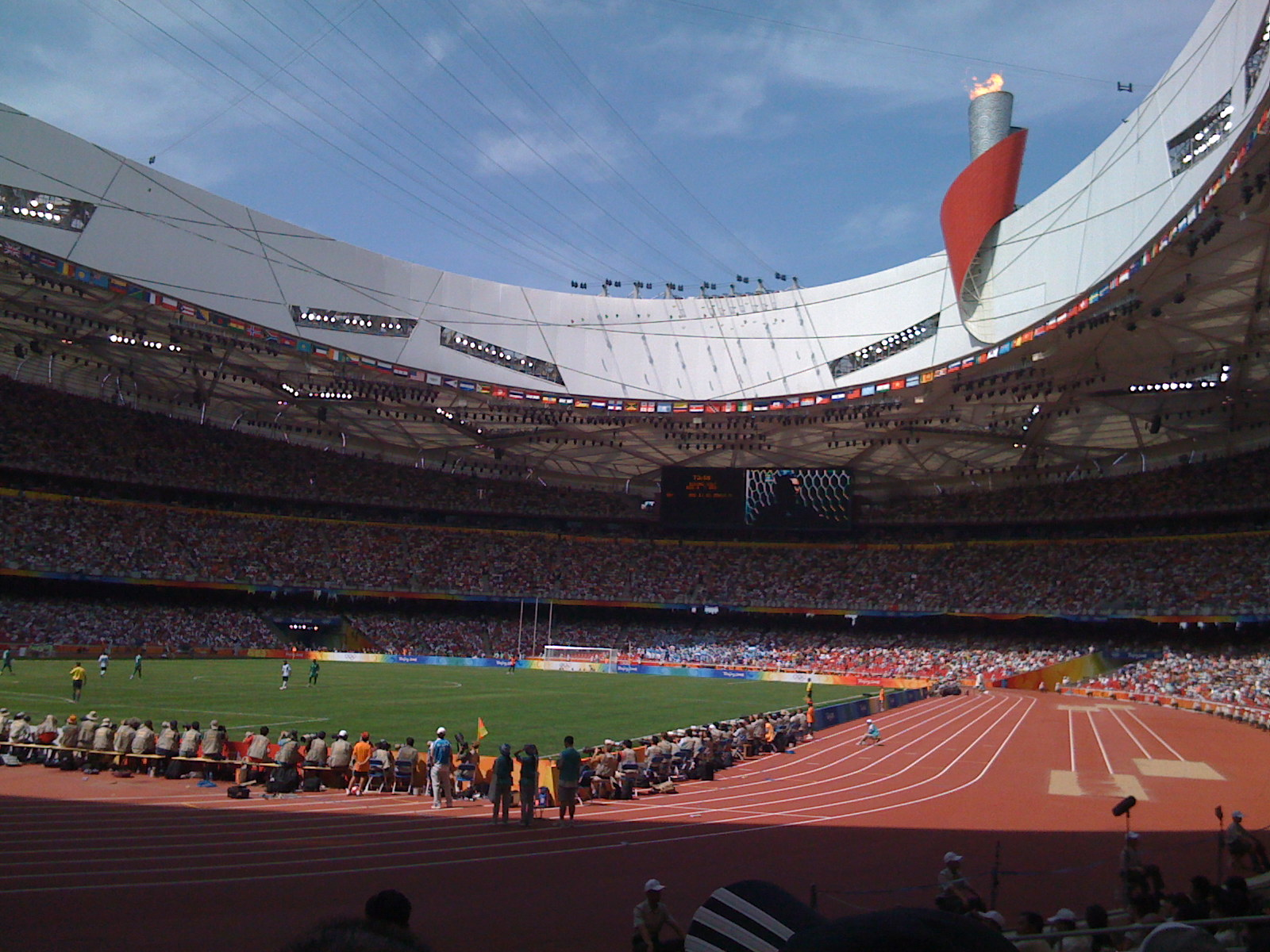
The Beijing National Stadium, where athletes like Tabarie Henry participated in track and field events.

=== Men's competition ===
Then-attendee of the Kansan Barton County Community College Tabarie Henry qualified for the Beijing Olympics when he ran the 400 meter dash in 45.42 seconds at the John McDonnell Invitational in Fayetteville, Arkansas in April. His qualifying time passed the Olympic A standard and marked the 15th fastest time in the event's history and the 10th fastest time set that year in all the world. Henry's participation in Beijing marked his Olympic debut. At the Olympics, Tabarie Henry participated in round one of his event on August 17. He was placed in Heat 7 against eventual silver medalist Jeremy Wariner of the United States and Belgian runner Cedric van Branteghem. With a time of 45.36 seconds, Henry ranked second of eight in his heat, behind Wariner by 0.13 seconds and ahead of van Branteghem by 0.18 seconds. Overall, Henry tied Nery Brenes of Costa Rica for 18th place out of 56 athletes. He progressed to semifinals.

At the August 19 semifinal rounds, Henry was placed in Heat 1, again against Wariner and also versus Brenes and Christopher Brown of the Bahamas, among others. Tabarie Henry ran the event in 45.19 seconds, ending seventh out of eight athletes in the heat, at 0.13 seconds behind Cuba's Williams Collazo (6th place) and 0.45 seconds ahead of Italy's Claudio Licciardello (8th place). Overall, Henry ranked 17th out of 24 athletes, and did not progress to finals on August 21.

=== Women's competition ===
LaVerne Jones-Ferrette, the only female athlete to participate in the Beijing Olympics on behalf of the United States Virgin Islands, participated in the 100 meters and 200 meters dashes. Her participation in Beijing marked her second Olympic games, as she also participated in the 100 m and 200 m in the Athenian 2004 Summer Olympics.

Jones-Ferrette's participation in the 100 m dash began with the August 15 first round. Jones-Ferrette was placed in Heat 1. She placed third behind Jamaica's Kerron Stewart (1st place) and Norway's Ezinne Okparaebo (2nd place) with a time of 11.41 seconds. Okparaebo was 0.09 seconds faster than Jones-Ferrette; Haiti's Barbara Pierre was 0.09 seconds slower. Jones-Ferrette ranked 20th out of 85 athletes in the first round, and progressed to round two. Jones was placed in Heat 1 during the second round, completing the event in 11.55 seconds and ranking fifth of eight athletes. Jones-Ferrette was 0.1 seconds slower than Kittitian runner Virgil Hodge and 0.1 seconds faster than Cameroon's Myriam Leonie Mani. Overall, Jones-Ferrette tied Ukrainian Natalia Pogrebniak for 29th place out of 40 athletes. She did not progress further.

LaVerne Jones-Ferrette also participated in the 200 m dash. On August 18, she was placed in Heat 6 of the first round, completing the event in 23.12 seconds and ranking fourth place out of eight athletes. Jones-Ferrette was 0.04 seconds behind Cuba's Roxana Diaz, and was 0.29 seconds ahead of Brazil's Evelyn Santos. Jones-Ferrette ranked 16th overall out of 48 athletes. Jones progressed to the August 19 second round, and was placed in Heat 1 against athletes that included Jamaica's Veronica Campbell and the Cayman Islands' Cydonie Mothersill. Jones-Ferrette placed seventh out of eight with a time of 23.37 seconds. Overall, LaVerne Jones-Ferrette placed 24th out of 32 athletes. She did not advance to semifinals.

=== Summary ===
Men

| Athlete | Event | Heat | | Semifinal | | Final | |
| Athlete | Event | Result | Rank | Result | Rank | Result | Rank |
|---|---|---|---|---|---|---|---|
| Tabarie Henry | 400 m | 45.36 NR | 2 Q | 45.19 NR | 7 | did not advance | |

Women

| Athlete | Event | Heat | | Quarterfinal | | Semifinal | | Final | |
| Athlete | Event | Result | Rank | Result | Rank | Result | Rank | Result | Rank |
|---|---|---|---|---|---|---|---|---|---|
| LaVerne Jones-Ferrette | 100 m | 11.41 | 3 Q | 11.55 | 5 | did not advance | | | |
| LaVerne Jones-Ferrette | 200 m | 23.12 | 4 Q | 23.37 | 7 | did not advance | | | |

Key

- Note–Ranks given for track events are within the athlete's heat only
- Q = Qualified for the next round
- q = Qualified for the next round as a fastest loser or, in field events, by position without achieving the qualifying target
- NR = National record
- N/A = Round not applicable for the event
- Bye = Athlete not required to compete in round

== Boxing ==
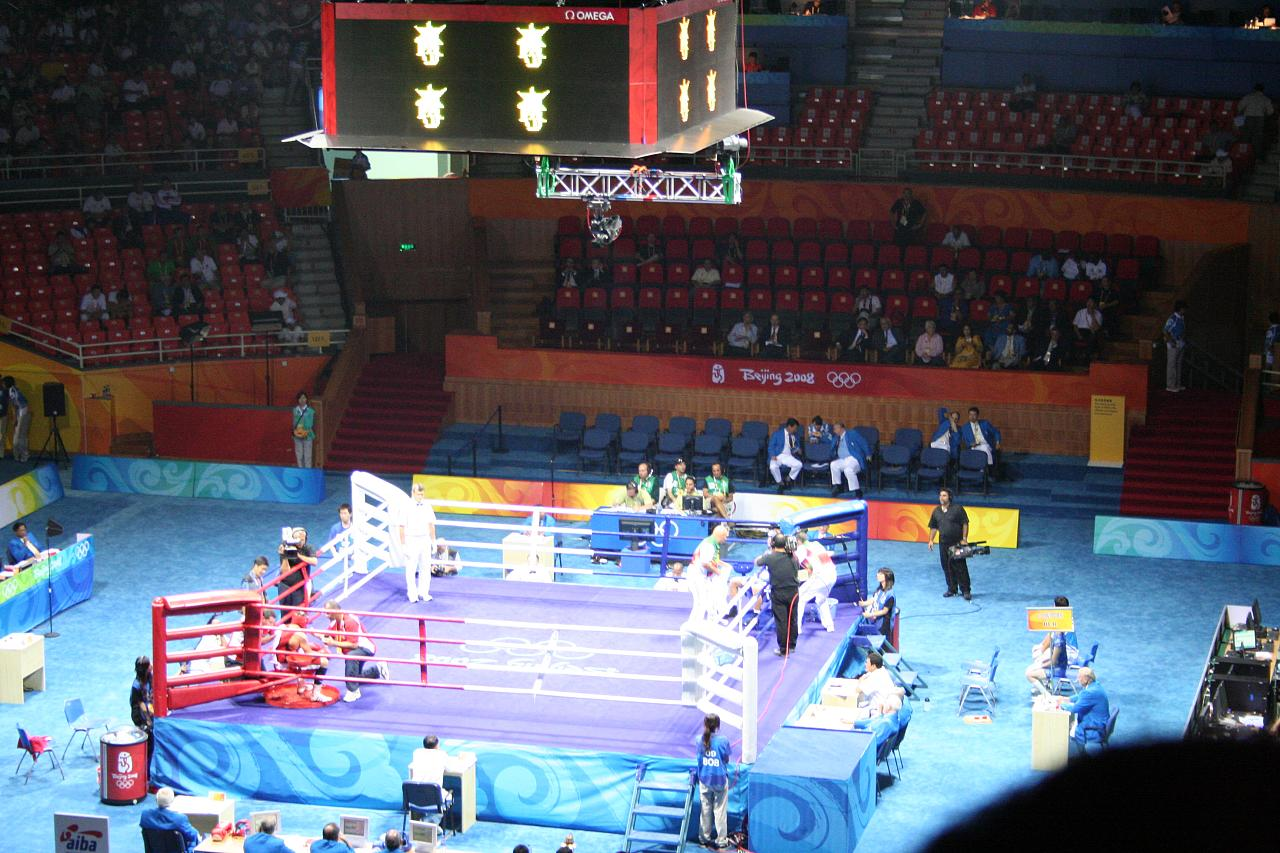
The boxing ring where Beijing Olympic events took place.

The Virgin Islands qualified two boxers for the Olympic boxing tournament. John Jackson qualified at the first American qualifying tournament. His brother Julius Jackson earned his spot at the second qualifier. The Beijing Olympics marked the first time that either of the Jackson brothers had participated in the Olympic games. Although neither medaled, John Jackson progressed to the Round of 16, which followed the preliminary round.

| Athlete | Event | Round of 32 | Round of 16 | Quarterfinals | Semifinals | Final | |
| Athlete | Event | Opposition Result | Opposition Result | Opposition Result | Opposition Result | Opposition Result | Rank |
|---|---|---|---|---|---|---|---|
| John Jackson | Welterweight | Nurudzinau (BLR); W 4–2 | Kim J-J (KOR); L 0–10 | did not advance | | | |
| Julius Jackson | Light heavyweight | Egan (IRL); L 2–22 | did not advance | | | | |

== Sailing ==
Then-student of Yale University Thomas Barrows III was the only sailor to participate on behalf of the Virgin Islands during the 2008 Beijing Olympics. His appearance in Beijing marked his first time at any Olympic games. He qualified for the Men's Laser class, which consists of ten races, and involved 43 athletes. In the first race, Barrows ranked 20th; in the second, 28th; in the third, 20th, in the fourth, 24th; in the fifth, 26th; in the sixth, 31st; in the seventh, 15th; in the eighth, 10th (his highest); and in the ninth, 21st. Barrows did not complete the tenth race. Overall, Barrows earned 195 points in total, but ended with 164 net points and ranked 21st in the event. He did not medal.

Men

| Athlete | Event | Race | | | | | | | | | | | Net points | Final rank |
| Athlete | Event | 1 | 2 | 3 | 4 | 5 | 6 | 7 | 8 | 9 | 10 | M* | Net points | Final rank |
|---|---|---|---|---|---|---|---|---|---|---|---|---|---|---|
| Thomas Barrows III | Laser | 20 | 28 | 20 | 24 | 26 | ~~31~~ | 15 | 10 | 21 | CAN | EL | 164 | 22 |

M = Medal race; EL = Eliminated – did not advance into the medal race; CAN = Race cancelled

== Shooting ==
Ned Gerard was the only shooter representing the Virgin Islands at the Beijing Olympics. He qualified for the shooting event men's 50 m small-bore rifle, prone. His participation in Beijing marked his Olympic debut. The shooting event took place on August 14. In the first round, Gerard scored 96 points; the second round, 96 points again; the third round, 95; the fourth round, 98; the fifth round, 97; and the last round, 98. Ned Gerard scored 580.0 points, ranking 53rd out of 56 athletes, and thus did not medal. He fell two points behind Cuba's Eliecer Perez and two points ahead of Kyrgyzstan's Ruslan Ismailov. Gerard was 122.7 points behind event leader Artur Ayvazyan of Ukraine.

Men

| Athlete | Event | Qualification | | Final | |
| Athlete | Event | Points | Rank | Points | Rank |
|---|---|---|---|---|---|
| Ned Gerard | 50 m rifle prone | 580 | 53 | did not advance | |

== Swimming ==
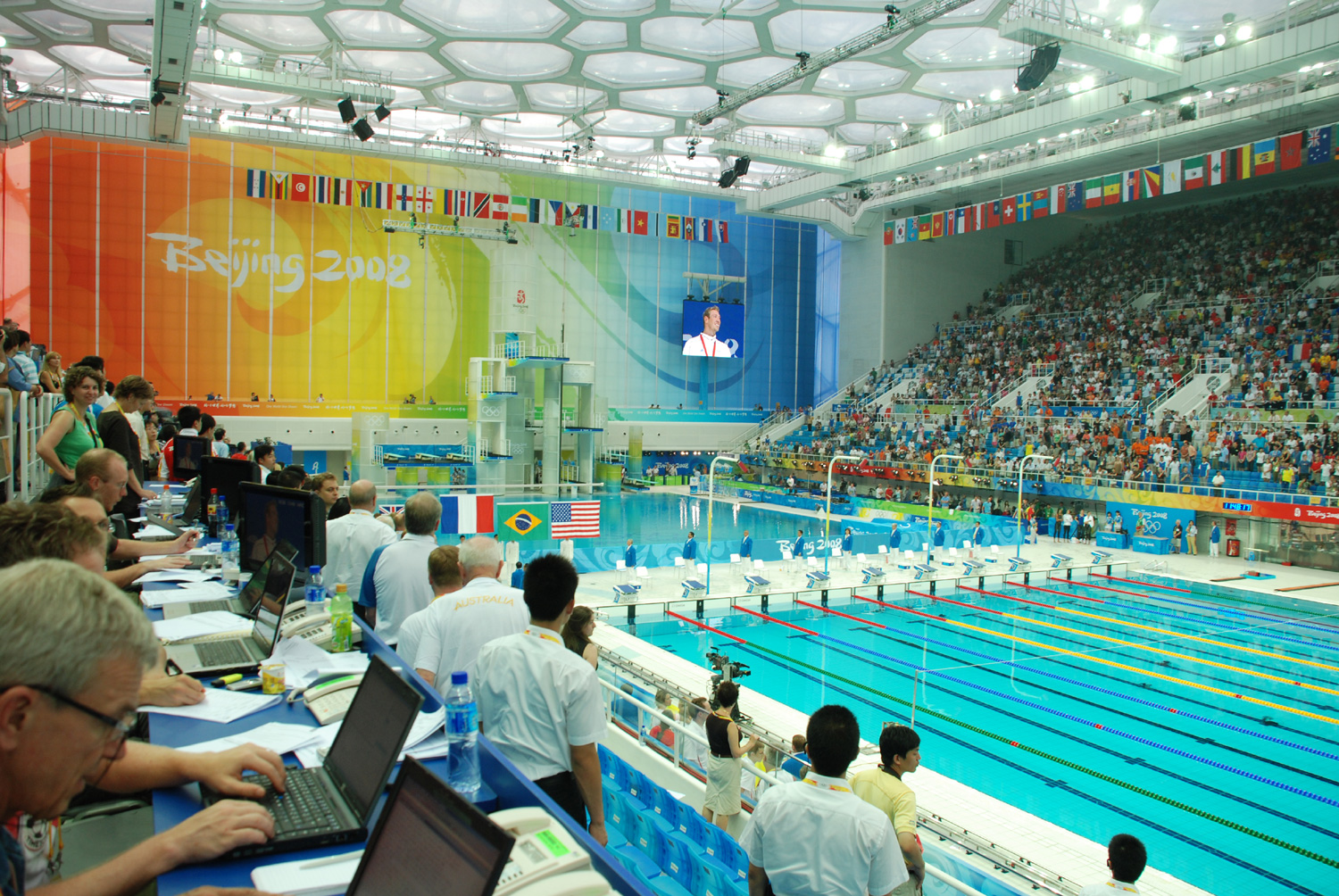
The inside of the "Water Cube", where the year's Olympic swimming events took place.

Former University of Georgia student Josh Laban was the only swimmer to participate on behalf of the Virgin Islands at the 2008 Beijing Olympics. He has known U.S. Virgin Islander swimmers Kieran Locke and Kevin Hensley since childhood, and competed alongside them during qualifying competitions. His participation marked his second appearance at the Olympics, with his first being at the 2004 Summer Olympics in Athens. In Beijing, Laban was placed in the seventh heat of the August 14 preliminaries round against swimmers that included Chile's Oliver Elliot and Romania's Norbert Trandafir. With a time of 23.28 seconds, Laban ranked seventh in the heat of eight athletes, defeating Kyrgyzstan's Vitaly Vasilev by 0.74 seconds and falling behind sixth-place swimmer Martyn Forde of Barbados by 0.20 seconds. Laban was 0.53 seconds slower than Elliot, who led the heat. Overall, Laban ranked 53rd out of 97 athletes competing in the event. He did not progress to the semifinal rounds held later that day.

Men

| Athlete | Event | Heat | | Semifinal | | Final | |
| Athlete | Event | Time | Rank | Time | Rank | Time | Rank |
|---|---|---|---|---|---|---|---|
| Joshua Laban | 50 m freestyle | 23.28 | 53 | did not advance | | | |

== See also ==
- Virgin Islands at the 2007 Pan American Games
- U.S. Virgin Islands at the 2010 Central American and Caribbean Games
