= Virgin Islands at the 2003 Pan American Games =

- IOC code: ISV
- NOC: Virgin Islands Olympic Committee
- Website: www.virginislandsolympics.com

in Santo Domingo 1–17 August 2003
- Medals Ranked 33rd: Gold 0 Silver 0 Bronze 0 Total 0

Pan American Games appearances (overview)
- 1967; 1971; 1975; 1979; 1983; 1987; 1991; 1995; 1999; 2003; 2007; 2011; 2015; 2019; 2023; 2027

The United States Virgin Islands competed at the 14th Pan American Games held in Santo Domingo, Dominican Republic from August 1 to August 17, 2003.

== Results by event ==
=== Swimming ===
==== Men's Competition ====
Athlete	Event	Heat		Final	
Athlete	Event	Time	Rank	Time	Rank
Josh Laban	50 m freestyle	23.72	16	23.51	13
Josh Laban	100 m freestyle	52.84	25	did not advance	
George Gleason	100 m freestyle	51.86	15	51.64	11
Kieran Locke	200 m freestyle	1:59.49	26	did not advance	

==== Women's Competition ====
Athlete	Event	Heat		Final	
Athlete	Event	Time	Rank	Time	Rank
Jamie Shufflebarger	200 m breaststroke	2:53.39	15	2:51.53	15

== See also ==
- 2002 Central American and Caribbean Games
- Virgin Islands at the 2004 Summer Olympics
