= Virgin Islands at the 1972 Summer Olympics =

- Flag of the United States Virgin Islands
- IOC code: ISV
- NOC: Virgin Islands Olympic Committee

in Munich
- Competitors: 16 in 4 sports
- Flag bearer: William Peets
- Medals: Gold 0 Silver 0 Bronze 0 Total 0

Summer Olympics appearances (overview)
- 1968; 1972; 1976; 1980; 1984; 1988; 1992; 1996; 2000; 2004; 2008; 2012; 2016; 2020; 2024

The United States Virgin Islands competed at the 1972 Summer Olympics in Munich, West Germany. Sixteen competitors, all men, took part in nine events in four sports.

== Athletics ==
Men
Track & road events

Athlete	Event	Heat		Quarterfinal		Semifinal		Final	
Athlete	Event	Result	Rank	Result	Rank	Result	Rank	Result	Rank
Calhern George	100 m	10.90	5	did not advance					

== Boxing ==
Men

Athlete	Event	1 Round	2 Round	3 Round	Quarterfinals	Semifinals	Final	
Athlete	Event	Opposition Result	Opposition Result	Opposition Result	Opposition Result	Opposition Result	Opposition Result	Rank
William Peets	Middleweight	BYE	Poul Knudsen (DEN); L 0–5	did not advance				

== Sailing ==
Open

Athlete	Event	Race							Net points	Final rank
Athlete	Event	1	2	3	4	5	6	7	Net points	Final rank
Richard B. Griffin	Finn	17	26	18	30	22	~~DNF~~	30	179.0	29
John Foster Sr. John Hamber	Tempest	~~20~~	17	19	16	9	18	16	131.0	20
Kenith Klein; Peter B. Jackson	Star	11	11	17	~~17~~	14	6	12	106.7	16
Dick Holmberg; David Jones; David Kelly	Soling	21	~~24~~	23	24	19	19	—N/a	136.0	24

== Shooting ==
Six male shooters represented the Virgin Islands in 1972.

Open

Athlete	Event	Final	
Athlete	Event	Score	Rank
José Álvarez	50 m pistol	486	57
Robert McAuliffe	25 m pistol	494	59
Harold Frederick	Men's 50 metre rifle prone	580	88
Douglas Mast	Men's 50 metre rifle prone	583	78
Adelbert Nico	50 m rifle, three positions	1017	66
Salvador Sanpere	50 m rifle, three positions	979	69
