= Virgin Islands at the 1976 Summer Olympics =

- Flag of the United States Virgin Islands
- IOC code: ISV
- NOC: Virgin Islands Olympic Committee

in Montreal
- Competitors: 21 in 6 sports
- Flag bearer: Ivan David
- Medals: Gold 0 Silver 0 Bronze 0 Total 0

Summer Olympics appearances (overview)
- 1968; 1972; 1976; 1980; 1984; 1988; 1992; 1996; 2000; 2004; 2008; 2012; 2016; 2020; 2024

The United States Virgin Islands competed at the 1976 Summer Olympics in Montreal, Quebec, Canada.

== Athletics ==
Men
Track & road events

Athlete	Event	Heat		Quarterfinal		Semifinal		Final	
Athlete	Event	Result	Rank	Result	Rank	Result	Rank	Result	Rank
Henry Klein	20 km walk	—N/a						1:50:50.4	36
Ronald Russell	100 m	11.22	7	Did not advance					

Women
Track & road events

Athlete	Event	Heat		Quarterfinal		Semifinal		Final	
Athlete	Event	Result	Rank	Result	Rank	Result	Rank	Result	Rank
Rita Hendricks	100 m	13.51	6	Did not advance					

== Boxing ==
Men

Athlete	Event	1 Round	2 Round	3 Round	Quarterfinals	Semifinals	Final	
Athlete	Event	Opposition Result	Opposition Result	Opposition Result	Opposition Result	Opposition Result	Opposition Result	Rank
Marcelino García	Welterweight	Ju Seok-Kim (KOR); L WO	Did not advance					
Earl Liburd	Light Middleweight	Mohamed Majeri (TUN); W WO	Rolando Garbey (CUB); L RSC-2	Did not advance				

== Sailing ==
Open

Athlete	Event	Race							Net points	Final rank
Athlete	Event	1	2	3	4	5	6	7	Net points	Final rank
Art Andrew	Finn	24	23	24	25	25	~~26~~	26	183.0	27
John Foster; Dan Morrison	Tempest	~~15~~	10	12	13	6	12	13	101.7	13
Dick Johnson; Tim Kelbert; Doug Graham	Soling	~~24~~	24	22	21	22	21	22	168.0	24

== Shooting ==
Open

Athlete	Event	Final	
Athlete	Event	Score	Rank
Harold Frederick	Men's 50 metre rifle prone	571	75
Peter Hogan	Men's 50 metre rifle prone	571	74
Russell Johnson	Skeet	168	65
Felix Navarro	Skeet	165	66

== Swimming ==
Men

Athlete	Event	Heat		Semifinal		Final	
Athlete	Event	Time	Rank	Time	Rank	Time	Rank
Steven Newkirk	100 metre freestyle	55.43	7	Did not advance			
Steven Newkirk	200 metre freestyle	1:59.95	5	Did not advance			
Steven Newkirk	100 metre butterfly	1:01.46	8	Did not advance			
Steven Newkirk	200 metre butterfly	2:17.84	6	Did not advance			

Women

Athlete	Event	Heat		Semifinal		Final	
Athlete	Event	Time	Rank	Time	Rank	Time	Rank
Shelley Cramer	100 metre freestyle	1:00.67	5	Did not advance			
Shelley Cramer	200 metre freestyle	2:14.94	7	Did not advance			
Shelley Cramer	100 metre butterfly	1:08.55	7	Did not advance			

== Wrestling ==
Men's freestyle

Athlete	Event	Elimination Pool						Final round	
Athlete	Event	Round 1 Result	Round 2 Result	Round 3 Result	Round 4 Result	Round 5 Result	Round 6 Result	Final round Result	Rank
Emille Kitnurse	−52 kg	Giuseppe Bognanni (ITA); L T 4:59	Jeon Hae-Sup (KOR); L T 1:30	—N/a				Did not advance	18
Ronald Joseph	−68 kg	Rami Miron (ISR); L T 2:09	Rafael González (PUR); L T 2:08	—N/a				Did not advance	22
Ivan David	−74 kg	Jarmo Övermark (FIN); L T 1:23	—N/a					Did not advance	21
Wayne Thomas	−90 kg	Levan Tediashvili (URS); L T 1:47	Peter Neumair (FRG); L T 0:40	—N/a				Did not advance	22
