= Virgin Islands at the 1991 Pan American Games =

- IOC code: ISV
- NOC: Virgin Islands Olympic Committee
- Website: www.virginislandsolympics.com

in Havana 8–18 August 1991
- Medals Ranked 24th: Gold 0 Silver 0 Bronze 1 Total 1

Pan American Games appearances (overview)
- 1967; 1971; 1975; 1979; 1983; 1987; 1991; 1995; 1999; 2003; 2007; 2011; 2015; 2019; 2023; 2027

The United States Virgin Islands competed at the 11th Pan American Games held in Havana, Cuba from August 2 to August 18, 1991.

The U.S. Virgin Islands attained a single bronze metal, in the Men's 4×100 meters.

== Medals ==
=== Bronze ===
===== Athletics =====
- Men's 4×100 meters: Keith Smith, Mitch Peters, Kevin Robinson, Neville Hodge, and Derry Pemberton.

== See also ==
- Virgin Islands at the 1992 Summer Olympics
