= Josh Laban =

US Virgin Islands swimmer (born 1982)

Joshua Laban MD, MHS, OLY
Personal information
- Full name: Joshua Noel Laban
- Nickname: Josh
- National team: (United States Virgin Islands) Virgin Islands
- Born: December 25, 1982 (age 43) Saint Croix, U.S. Virgin Islands
- Height: 6 ft 3 in (1.91 m)

Sport
- Sport: Swimming
- Strokes: Freestyle
- Club: St. Croix Dolphins; Coral Springs Swim Club
- College team: University of Georgia (U.S.)

Joshua Noel Laban (born December 25, 1982) is an Olympic swimmer from the U.S. Virgin Islands. He was the USVI's flagbearer for the 2008 Olympics and the 2007 Pan American Games. He attended college and swam at the University of Miami in Coral Gables, Florida, and University of Georgia in Athens, Georgia. He obtained a medical degree from Meharry Medical College in Nashville, Tennessee and completed his residency in internal medicine at the University of Miami.

== See also ==
- List of University of Georgia people

== International tournaments ==
- 2008 Olympics,
- 2007 Pan American Games,
- 2007 World Championships,
- 2006 Central American and Caribbean Games, and
- 2004 Olympics.
- 2003 Pan American Games
- 1999 Pan American Games
