= Virgin Islands at the 2007 Pan American Games =

- IOC code: ISV
- NOC: Virgin Islands Olympic Committee
- Website: www.virginislandsolympics.com

in Rio de Janeiro, Brazil July 13, 2007 – July 29, 2007
- Competitors: 50
- Flag bearer: Josh Laban
- Medals Ranked 33rd: Gold 0 Silver 0 Bronze 0 Total 0

Pan American Games appearances (overview)
- 1967; 1971; 1975; 1979; 1983; 1987; 1991; 1995; 1999; 2003; 2007; 2011; 2015; 2019; 2023; 2027

The United States Virgin Islands competed at the 15th Pan American Games held in Rio de Janeiro, Brazil from July 13 to July 29, 2007.

== Results by event ==
=== Basketball ===
==== Men's team competition ====
- Team roster

- Steven Hodge
- Kevin Sheppard
- Carl Krauser
- Cuthbert Victor
- Jameel Heywood
- Jason Edwin
- Darnell Miller
- Kaylen Gregory
- Akeem Francis
- Carl Thomas
- Kitwana Rhymer
- Frank Elegar

- Head coach: Tevester Anderson

== See also ==
- Virgin Islands at the 2008 Summer Olympics
