= Virgin Islands at the 2020 Summer Olympics =

- Flag of the United States Virgin Islands
- IOC code: ISV
- NOC: Virgin Islands Olympic Committee
- Website: www.virginislandsolympics.com

in Tokyo, Japan July 23, 2021 – August 8, 2021
- Competitors: 4 in 3 sports
- Flag bearers (opening): Natalia Kuipers; Adriel Sanes
- Flag bearer (closing): Eddie Lovett
- Medals: Gold 0 Silver 0 Bronze 0 Total 0

Summer Olympics appearances (overview)
- 1968; 1972; 1976; 1980; 1984; 1988; 1992; 1996; 2000; 2004; 2008; 2012; 2016; 2020; 2024; 2028

The United States Virgin Islands, also known as the Virgin Islands and officially as the Virgin Islands of the United States, competed at the 2020 Summer Olympics in Tokyo. Originally scheduled to take place from 24 July to 9 August 2020, the Games were postponed to 23 July to 8 August 2021, because of the COVID-19 pandemic. It was the territory's thirteenth appearance at the Summer Olympics, since its debut at the 1968 Summer Olympics in Mexico City. The Virgin Islands delegation consisted of four athletes competing in three sports. Virgin Islands did not win any medals at the Games.

== Background ==
The Virgin Islands Olympic Committee was founded in 1966 and was recognized by the International Olympic Committee in 1967. The nation made its first Olympic appearance at the 1968 Summer Olympics in Mexico City. Since then, it has competed in every Olympics except the 1980 Summer Olympics in Moscow. The 2020 Summer Olympics was the nation's thirteenth appearance at the Summer Olympics.

The 2020 Summer Olympics was held in Tokyo, Japan, between 23 July and 8 August 2021. Originally scheduled to take place from 24 July to 9 August 2020, the Games were postponed due to the COVID-19 pandemic. For the first time, the International Olympic Committee invited each National Olympic Committee to select one female and one male athlete to jointly carry their flag during the opening ceremony. Swimmers Natalia Kuipers and Adriel Sanes were the territory's flag bearers at the opening ceremony. Eddie Lovett served as the flag bearer during the closing ceremony. Virgin Islands did not win a medal at the Games.

== Competitors ==
The Virgin Islands delegation consisted of two swimmers, an archer, and a track and field athlete.

Sport	Men	Women	Total
Archery	1	0	1
Athletics	1	0	1
Swimming	1	1	2
Total	3	1	4

== Archery ==
As per World Archery, each National Olympic Committee (NOC) could enter a maximum of six competitors with three per gender. NOCs that qualified teams were also allowed to have each member compete in the individual event with the remaining spots filled by individual qualification tournaments. Virgin Islands has received one universality quota from World Archery, and Nicholas D'Amour was chosen to represent the territory in the men's individual event.

The ranking rounds were held at the Yumenoshima Park in Tokyo on 23 July 2021. In the men's individual ranking rounds, D'Amour was seeded 23rd with a score of 660 points. In the round of 64 of the men's individual events, D'Amour lost to Ryan Tyack of Australia and exited the competition.

Athlete	Event	Ranking round		Round of 64	Round of 32	Round of 16	Quarterfinals	Semifinals	Final / BM	
Athlete	Event	Score	Seed	Opposition Score	Opposition Score	Opposition Score	Opposition Score	Opposition Score	Opposition Score	Rank
Nicholas D'Amour	Men's individual	660	23	Tyack (AUS); L 5–6	Did not advance					

== Athletics ==
As per the governing body World Athletics (WA), a NOC was allowed to enter up to three qualified athletes in each individual event and one qualified relay team if the Olympic Qualifying Standards (OQS) for the respective events had been met during the qualifying period. The remaining places were allocated based on the World Athletics Rankings which were derived from the average of the best five results for an athlete over the designated qualifying period, weighted by the importance of the meet. Virgin Islands received a universality slot from the WA to send a male track and field athlete to the Olympics.

The athletics events were held at the Japan National Stadium in Tokyo. In the men's 110 m hurdles, Eddie Lovett set his season's best time of 14.17 seconds. However, he was ranked only seventh in his heat and did not qualify for the semifinals. This was the second and final Olympic appearance for Lovett after his debut at the 2016 Summer Olympics.

Key

- Note–Ranks given for track events are within the athlete's heat only
- Q = Qualified for the next round
- q = Qualified for the next round as a fastest loser or, in field events, by position without achieving the qualifying target
- NR = National record
- N/A = Round not applicable for the event
- Bye = Athlete not required to compete in round

Track & road events

Athlete	Event	Heat		Semifinal		Final	
Athlete	Event	Result	Rank	Result	Rank	Result	Rank
Eddie Lovett	Men's 110 m hurdles	14.17 SB	7	Did not advance			

== Swimming ==
As per the Fédération internationale de natation (FINA) guidelines, a NOC was permitted to enter a maximum of two qualified athletes in each individual event, who have achieved the Olympic Qualifying Time (OQT). If the quota was not filled, one athlete per event was allowed to enter, provided they achieved the Olympic Selection Time (OST). The qualifying time standards should have been achieved in competitions approved by World Aquatics in the period between 1 March 2019 to 27 June 2021. FINA also allowed NOCs to enter swimmers (one per gender) under a universality place even if they have not achieved the standard entry times (OQT/OST). Virgin Islands received a |universality invitation from FINA to send two swimmers (one per gender) to the Games.

The swimming events were held at the Tokyo Aquatics Centre. Natalia Kuipers competed in the women's 400 metre freestyle and Adriel Sanes competed in the men's 100 metre breaststroke and men's 200 metre breaststroke events, and neither advanced past the heats. This was the debut Olympic Games for both Kuipers and Sanes.

Athlete	Event	Heat		Semifinal		Final	
Athlete	Event	Time	Rank	Time	Rank	Time	Rank
Adriel Sanes	Men's 100 m breaststroke	1:02.43	42	Did not advance			
Adriel Sanes	Men's 200 m breaststroke	2:16.87	33	Did not advance			
Natalia Kuipers	Women's 400 m freestyle	4:39.42	26	—N/a		Did not advance	

== See also ==
- Virgin Islands at the 2019 Pan American Games
