= Virgin Islands at the 2004 Summer Olympics =

- Flag of the United States Virgin Islands
- IOC code: ISV
- NOC: Virgin Islands Olympic Committee
- Website: www.virginislandsolympics.com

in Athens
- Competitors: 6 in 4 sports
- Flag bearer: LaVerne Jones
- Medals: Gold 0 Silver 0 Bronze 0 Total 0

Summer Olympics appearances (overview)
- 1968; 1972; 1976; 1980; 1984; 1988; 1992; 1996; 2000; 2004; 2008; 2012; 2016; 2020; 2024; 2028

The United States Virgin Islands competed at the 2004 Summer Olympics in Athens, Greece, from 13 to 29 August 2004.

== Athletics ==
Virgin Islands athletes have so far achieved qualifying standards in the following athletics events (up to a maximum of 3 athletes in each event at the 'A' Standard, and 1 at the 'B' Standard).

Men

Athlete	Event	Heat		Quarterfinal		Semifinal		Final	
Athlete	Event	Result	Rank	Result	Rank	Result	Rank	Result	Rank
Adrian Durant	100 m	10.52	6	did not advance					

Women

Athlete	Event	Heat		Quarterfinal		Semifinal		Final	
Athlete	Event	Result	Rank	Result	Rank	Result	Rank	Result	Rank
LaVerne Jones	100 m	11.38	4 q	11.44	6	did not advance			
LaVerne Jones	200 m	23.20	3 Q	23.09	6	did not advance			

Key

- Note–Ranks given for track events are within the athlete's heat only
- Q = Qualified for the next round
- q = Qualified for the next round as a fastest loser or, in field events, by position without achieving the qualifying target
- NR = National record
- N/A = Round not applicable for the event
- Bye = Athlete not required to compete in round

== Sailing ==
Virgin Islands sailors have qualified one boat for each of the following events.

Open

Athlete	Event	Race											Net points	Final rank
Athlete	Event	1	2	3	4	5	6	7	8	9	10	M*	Net points	Final rank
Timothy Pitts	Laser	~~42~~	40	41	40	36	39	37	34	34	40	40	381	41

M = Medal race; OCS = On course side of the starting line; DSQ = Disqualified; DNF = Did not finish; DNS= Did not start; RDG = Redress given

== Shooting ==
Men

Athlete	Event	Qualification		Final	
Athlete	Event	Points	Rank	Points	Rank
Chris Rice	10 m air pistol	551	46	did not advance	
Chris Rice	50 m pistol	529	41	did not advance	

== Swimming ==
Virgin Islands swimmers earned qualifying standards in the following events (up to a maximum of 2 swimmers in each event at the A-standard time, and 1 at the B-standard time):

Men

Athlete	Event	Heat		Semifinal		Final	
Athlete	Event	Time	Rank	Time	Rank	Time	Rank
George Gleason	100 m freestyle	51.69	44	did not advance			
George Gleason	100 m backstroke	57.64	37	did not advance			
Josh Laban	50 m freestyle	23.43	=43	did not advance			

== See also ==
- Virgin Islands at the 2003 Pan American Games
