= Paul Stoeken =

American Virgin Islands windsurfer and sailing coach (born 1975)

Personal information
- Nationality: American Virgin Islander
- Born: Paul R. Stoeken; January 9, 1975 (age 51) Englewood, New Jersey, U.S.
- Height: 170 cm (5 ft 7 in)
- Weight: 63 kg (139 lb)

Sailing career
- Sport: Windsurfing
- Event: Mistral One Design
- College team: St. Mary's College of Maryland
- Club: St. Thomas Yacht Club

Paul R. Stoeken (born January 9, 1975) is a former windsurfer and sailing coach who competed for the United States Virgin Islands. He represented the territory at the 1996 Summer Olympics and the 2000 Summer Olympics in the Mistral One Design class.

After retiring from Olympic competition, Stoeken co-founded the junior sailing program at the St. Thomas Yacht Club and coached several Virgin Islands sailors who went on to compete internationally, including Ian Barrows, Cy Thompson, and Taylor Canfield. He later founded Island Sol, a sailing, windsurfing, and kiteboarding school on St. Thomas.

== Early life and education ==
Stoeken was born in Englewood, New Jersey, on January 9, 1975. He graduated from Antilles School in St. Thomas in 1993. He then attended St. Mary's College of Maryland, where he sailed for the college team. St. Mary's lists him among its Olympic alumni.

== Competitive career ==
=== Junior and amateur racing ===
In 1992, at age 17, Stoeken won the men's division of the Blue Marlin Surf Tour, a British Virgin Islands distance race that revived the Hook-In-Hold-On (HIHO) event and preceded the modern HIHO series.

In 1993 he won the boardsailing lightweight division at the US Sailing U.S. Youth Championship, an achievement recognized by the Major Hall Trophy.

=== Olympic Games ===
Stoeken competed in the men's boardsailing event at the 1996 Summer Olympics in Atlanta, sailing the Mistral One Design. He finished 23rd in a fleet of 46 competitors.

He returned to the Games at the 2000 Summer Olympics in Sydney, again in the Mistral One Design class, where he placed 32nd. He was a wild card selection for the 2000 Games.

The Virgin Islands Sailing Association lists Stoeken on the territory's sailing rosters for both the 1996 and 2000 Olympic Games.

=== Other international competition ===
Between his two Olympic appearances, Stoeken competed at the 1997 World Championship, the 1998 Central American and Caribbean Games, and the 1999 Pan American Games.

=== Later racing ===
Stoeken continued to race locally after retiring from windsurfing, competing in keelboats and multihulls at the St. Thomas International Regatta. He skippered the IC24 One Love in the CSA 24 Spinnaker class in 2006, and finished second in the Beach Cats class in 2014 sailing a Hobie 16 under the Island Sol name.

== Coaching and business ==
Following the 2000 Sydney Games, Stoeken co-founded the St. Thomas Yacht Club's junior sailing program with Liz Casner. He subsequently coached a number of Virgin Islands junior sailors who reached the elite level, among them Taylor Canfield, Cy Thompson, and Ian Barrows. Thompson competed at the 2012 and 2016 Summer Olympics, and Barrows won a bronze medal in the men's skiff at the 2024 Summer Olympics.

Stoeken founded Island Sol, a St. Thomas company offering sailing, windsurfing, and kiteboarding instruction. The company also chartered IC24 keelboats to teams competing in the St. Thomas International Regatta.

== See also ==
- Virgin Islands at the 1996 Summer Olympics
- Virgin Islands at the 2000 Summer Olympics
- Sailing at the 1996 Summer Olympics – Men's Mistral
- Sailing at the 2000 Summer Olympics – Men's Mistral
