= Virgin Islands at the 1968 Summer Olympics =

- Flag of the United States Virgin Islands
- IOC code: ISV
- NOC: Virgin Islands Olympic Committee

in Mexico City
- Competitors: 6 in 3 sports
- Flag bearer: Liston Sprauve
- Medals: Gold 0 Silver 0 Bronze 0 Total 0

Summer Olympics appearances (overview)
- 1968; 1972; 1976; 1980; 1984; 1988; 1992; 1996; 2000; 2004; 2008; 2012; 2016; 2020; 2024

The United States Virgin Islands competed in the Summer Olympic Games for the first time at the 1968 Summer Olympics in Mexico City, Mexico.

== Athletics ==
Men
Track & road events

Athlete	Event	Heat		Quarterfinal		Semifinal		Final	
Athlete	Event	Result	Rank	Result	Rank	Result	Rank	Result	Rank
Franklin Blyden	110 m hurdles	14.7	5	did not advance					
Carl Plaskett	200 m	21:29	6	did not advance					

== Sailing ==
Open

Athlete	Event	Race							Net points	Final rank
Athlete	Event	1	2	3	4	5	6	7	Net points	Final rank
Per Dohm	Finn	28	22	27	~~32~~	31	28	25	197	32
Rudolph Thompson; John Werge Hamber	Flying Dutchman	17	23	22	~~27~~	26	24	24	172	25

== Weightlifting ==
Men

Athlete	Event	Military Press		Snatch		Clean & Jerk		Total	Rank
Athlete	Event	Result	Rank	Result	Rank	Result	Rank	Total	Rank
Liston Sprauve	+90 kg	150.0	13	140.0	12	177.5	11	467.5	12
