= Athletics at the 2023 Pan American Games – Women's 400 metres hurdles =

Women's 400 metres hurdles at the 2023 Pan American Games
- Venue: Julio Martínez National Stadium
- Dates: November 1 – November 3
- Competitors: 10 from 8 nations
- Winning time: 56.44

Medalists
Gold medal	Gianna Woodruff	Panama
Silver medal	Ewellyn Santos	Brazil
Bronze medal	Daniela Rojas	Costa Rica

The women's 400 metres hurdles competition of the athletics events at the 2023 Pan American Games was held on November 1 and 3 at the Julio Martínez National Stadium of Santiago, Chile.

== Records ==
Prior to this competition, the existing world and Pan American Games records were as follows:

World record	Sydney McLaughlin (USA)	50.68	Eugene, United States	July 22, 2022
Pan American Games record	Daimí Pernía (CUB)	53.44	Winnipeg, Canada	July 28, 1999

== Schedule ==
Date	Time	Round
November 1, 2023	18:00	Semifinal
November 3, 2023	17:35	Final

== Results ==
All times shown are in seconds.

KEY:	q	Fastest non-qualifiers	Q	Qualified	NR	National record	PB	Personal best	SB	Seasonal best	DQ	Disqualified

=== Semifinal ===
Qualification: First 3 in each heat (Q) and next 2 fastest (q) qualified for the final. The results were as follows:

Rank	Heat	Name	Nationality	Time	Notes
1	2	Chayenne da Silva	Brazil	57.85	Q
2	1	Daniela Rojas	Costa Rica	58.16	Q
3	1	Ewellyn Santos	Brazil	58.29	Q
4	1	Gianna Woodruff	Panama	58.68	Q
5	2	Zurian Hechavarría	Cuba	58.99	Q
6	2	Michelle Smith	Virgin Islands	59.32	Q
7	1	Virginia Villalba	Ecuador	1:00.28	q
8	2	Franshina Martínez	Dominican Republic	1:00.55	q
9	1	Camille de Oliveira	Brazil	1:00.72	
10	2	María Arnaiz	Chile	1:00.78	

=== Final ===
The results were as follows:

Rank	Lane	Name	Nationality	Time	Notes
1st place, gold medalist(s)	8	Gianna Woodruff	Panama	56.44	
2nd place, silver medalist(s)	4	Ewellyn Santos	Brazil	57.18	
3rd place, bronze medalist(s)	5	Daniela Rojas	Costa Rica	57.41	
4	3	Michelle Smith	Virgin Islands	57.53	
5	7	Zurian Hechavarría	Cuba	57.70	
6	2	Virginia Villalba	Ecuador	58.99	
7	1	Franshina Martínez	Dominican Republic	1:02.20	
	6	Chayenne da Silva	Brazil	DNF	
