= Kieran Locke =

Personal information
- Nickname: K-Locke
- Nationality: (United States Virgin Islands) U.S. Virgin Islands
- Born: March 19, 1984 (age 42)
- Height: 6 ft 2 in (1.88 m)

Sport
- Sport: Swimming
- Strokes: Freestyle, backstroke
- College team: Yale University

Kieran Locke (born March 19, 1984) is a former national-team swimmer from the United States Virgin Islands. He is the older brother of fellow USVI swimmer Morgan Locke. He went to college and swam for the USA's Yale University, in the mid-2000s.

He swam for the Virgin Islands at:

- World Championships: 2005, 2007
- Pan American Games: 2003, 2007
- Central American & Caribbean Games: 2006
- Short Course Worlds: 2004
