= Virgin Islands at the 2024 Summer Olympics =

- IOC code: ISV
- NOC: Virgin Islands Olympic Committee
- Website: www.virginislandsolympics.com

in Paris, France 26 July 2024 – 11 August 2024
- Competitors: 5 (4 men and 1 woman) in 4 sports
- Flag bearers: Kruz Schembri & Natalia Kuipers
- Medals: Gold 0 Silver 0 Bronze 0 Total 0

Summer Olympics appearances (overview)
- 1968; 1972; 1976; 1980; 1984; 1988; 1992; 1996; 2000; 2004; 2008; 2012; 2016; 2020; 2024

The United States Virgin Islands, also known as the Virgin Islands and officially as the Virgin Islands of the United States, competed at the 2024 Summer Olympics in Paris, France. It was the territory's twelfth appearance at the Summer Olympics, since its debut at the 1968 Summer Olympics in Mexico City. The Virgin Islands delegation consisted of five athletes competing in four sports. Virgin Islands did not win any medals at the Games.

== Background ==
The Virgin Islands Olympic Committee was founded in 1966 and was recognized by the International Olympic Committee in 1967. The nation made its first Olympic appearance at the 1968 Summer Olympics in Mexico City. Since then, it has competed in every Olympics except the 1980 Summer Olympics in Moscow. The 2024 Summer Olympics was the nation's twelfth appearance at the Summer Olympics.

The 2024 Summer Olympics was held in Paris, France, between 26 July and 11 August 2024. Swimmer Natalia Kuipers and fencer Kruz Schembri were the territory's flag bearers at the opening ceremony. Virgin Islands did not win a medal at the Games.

== Competitors ==
The Virgin Islands delegation consisted of five athletes.

Sport	Men	Women	Total
Archery	1	0	1
Athletics	1	0	1
Fencing	1	0	1
Swimming	1	1	2
Total	4	1	5

== Archery ==
As per the qualification system drawn up by the World Archery Federation, each National Olympic Committee (NOC) was permitted to enter a maximum of six competitors, three per gender. NOCs that qualify teams for a particular gender are able to send a three-member team to the team event and also have each member compete in the individual event with the remaining spots filled by individual qualification tournaments. The US Virgin Islands qualified one archer, Nicholas D'Amour, to the 2024 Summer Olympics through the Panamerican Olympic Qualifier, held in Medellin, Colombia.

D'Amour, born on 4 September 2001 in Pennington, New Jersey, was competing at his second consecutive Olympics, having made his Olympic debut at the 2020 Summer Olympics in Tokyo, where he finished joint 33rd.

The archery events were held at the Les Invalides esplanade in Paris from 25 July to 4 August 2024. In the ranking round, D'Amour shot a score of 673 to be seeded 16th out of 64 competitors. In the round of 64, he lost to Fumiya Saito of Japan by a score of 4–6 and was eliminated, finishing equal 33rd overall.

Athlete	Event	Ranking round		Round of 64	Round of 32	Round of 16	Quarterfinals	Semifinals	Final / BM	
Athlete	Event	Score	Seed	Opposition Score	Opposition Score	Opposition Score	Opposition Score	Opposition Score	Opposition Score	Rank
Nicholas D'Amour	Men's individual	673	16	Saito (JPN); L 4–6	Did not advance					

== Athletics ==
As per the governing body World Athletics (WA), a NOC was allowed to enter up to three qualified athletes in each individual event if the Olympic Qualifying Standards (OQS) had been met during the qualification period from 1 July 2023 to 30 June 2024.

The Virgin Islands entered one athlete in athletics, Eduardo Garcia, who competed in the men's marathon. Born in Florida, he qualified for the Olympics with a season best score of 1041.

The marathon was held on 10 August 2024, with the course starting and finishing at the Esplanade des Invalides in Paris. Garcia did not finish the race.

Key

- Note–Ranks given for track events are within the athlete's heat only
- Q = Qualified for the next round
- q = Qualified for the next round as a fastest loser or, in field events, by position without achieving the qualifying target
- NR = National record
- N/A = Round not applicable for the event
- Bye = Athlete not required to compete in round

Track and road events

Athlete	Event	Final	
Athlete	Event	Result	Rank
Eduardo Garcia	Men's marathon	DNF	

== Fencing ==
Virgin Islands entered one fencer into the competition. Kruz Schembri qualified by winning the gold medal at the FIE Olympic Qualification Tournament Americas held in San José, Costa Rica in April 2024. He competed in the men's individual foil event. This made him the first fencer from the Virgin Islands to compete at the Olympics in 40 years, since the territory last sent fencers to the 1984 Summer Olympics in Los Angeles. The 17-year old Schembri is from Saint Croix.

The fencing events were held at the Grand Palais in Paris. Schembri, seeded 33rd in the 37-fencer field, led 6–2 midway through the first period in his round of 64 match against Canada's Blake Broszus, before Broszus recovered to win the match 15–8, and eliminating Schembri from the competition.

Athlete	Event	Round of 64	Round of 32	Round of 16	Quarterfinal	Semifinal	Final / BM	
Athlete	Event	Opposition Score	Opposition Score	Opposition Score	Opposition Score	Opposition Score	Opposition Score	Rank
Kruz Schembri	Men's foil	Broszus (CAN); L 8–15	Did not advance					

== Swimming ==
As per the World Aquatics guidelines, a NOC was permitted to enter a maximum of two qualified athletes in each individual event, who have achieved the Olympic Qualifying Time. One athlete per event will be allowed to enter if they meet the Olympic Selection Time if the quota is not filled. NOCs were allowed to enter swimmers (one per gender) under a universality place even if no one achieved the standard entry times. Virgin Islands sent two swimmers to compete at the 2024 Paris Olympics.

Natalia Kuipers competed in the women's 400 metre freestyle. She qualified during the 2024 Spanish Trials with an entry time of 4:29.94. Maximillian Willson competed in the men's 100 metre backstroke having qualified during the 36th Central American and Caribbean Swimming Confederation Championships 2024 with an entry time of 55.15.

The swimming events were held at the Paris La Défense Arena in Nanterre. Kuipers finished 20th in the women's 400 metre freestyle heat with a time of 4:33.46 and did not advance to the final. Willson finished 27th in the men's 100 metre backstroke heat with a time of 54.49 and did not advance to the semi-finals either.

Athlete	Event	Heat		Semifinal		Final	
Athlete	Event	Time	Rank	Time	Rank	Time	Rank
Maximillian Wilson	Men's 100 m backstroke	54.49	27	Did not advance			
Natalia Kuipers	Women's 400 m freestyle	4:33.46	20	—N/a		Did not advance	

== See also ==
- Virgin Islands at the 2023 Pan American Games
