= Virgin Islands at the 2023 Pan American Games =

- Flag of the United States Virgin Islands
- IOC code: ISV
- NOC: Virgin Islands Olympic Committee

in Santiago, Chile October 20, 2023 – November 5, 2023
- Competitors: 12 (8 men and 4 women) in 6 sports
- Flag bearers (opening): Adriel Sanes & Natalia Kuipers
- Flag bearers (closing): Nicholas D'Amour & Michelle Smith
- Medals: Gold 0 Silver 0 Bronze 0 Total 0

Pan American Games appearances (overview)
- 1967; 1971; 1975; 1979; 1983; 1987; 1991; 1995; 1999; 2003; 2007; 2011; 2015; 2019; 2023

The United States Virgin Islands also known as the Virgin Islands is scheduled to compete at the 2023 Pan American Games in Santiago, Chile from October 20 to November 5, 2023. This will be the Virgin Islands's 15th appearance at the Pan American Games, having competed at every edition of the games since 1967.

The Virgin Islands team consisted of 12 athletes competing in six sports. Swimmers Adriel Sanes and Natalia Kuipers were the country's flagbearers during the opening ceremony. Meanwhile, archer Nicholas D'Amour and track athlete Michelle Smith were the country's flagbearers during the closing ceremony.

== Competitors ==
The following is the list of number of competitors (per gender) participating at the games per sport/discipline.

Sport	Men	Women	Total
Archery	1	1	2
Athletics (track and field)	1	1	2
Fencing	1	0	1
Golf	0	1	1
Sailing	3	0	3
Swimming	2	1	3
Total	8	4	12

== Archery ==
The Virgin Islands qualified two archers during the 2022 Pan American Archery Championships.

Athlete	Event	Ranking Round		Round of 32	Round of 16	Quarterfinals	Semifinals	Final / BM	Rank
Athlete	Event	Score	Seed	Opposition Score	Opposition Score	Opposition Score	Opposition Score	Opposition Score	Rank
Nicholas D'Amour	Men's individual recurve	652	21	Ticas (ESA); L 5–6	Did not advance				
Anne Abernathy	Women's individual recurve	596	21	Vazquez (MEX); L 0–6	Did not advance				
Nicholas D'Amour; Anne Abernathy	Mixed team recurve	1248	9	—N/a	Cuba; L 1–5	Did not advance			

== Athletics (track and field) ==
The Virgin Islands qualified two athletes (one male and one female).

Key

- Note–Ranks given for track events are for the entire round
- Q = Qualified for the next round
- q = Qualified for the next round as a fastest loser or, in field events, by position without achieving the qualifying target
- NR = National record
- GR = Games record
- PB = Personal best
- NM = No mark
- N/A = Round not applicable for the event
- Bye = Athlete not required to compete in round

Track and road events

Athlete	Event	Semifinals		Final	
Athlete	Event	Result	Rank	Result	Rank
Malique Smith	Men's 400 m hurdles	51.47	6	Did not advance	
Michelle Smith	Women's 400 m hurdles	59.32	3 Q	57.53	4

== Fencing ==
The Virgin Islands qualified two male fencers through the 2022 Pan American Fencing Championships in Asunción, Paraguay. However, the sabre quota was declined.

Individual

Men

Athlete	Event	Pool Round		Round of 16	Quarterfinals	Semifinals	Final	
Athlete	Event	Victories	Seed	Opposition Score	Opposition Score	Opposition Score	Opposition Score	Rank
Kruz Schembri	Foil	2V–3D	9 Q	Archilei (MEX); L 9–15	Did not advance			

== Golf ==
The Virgin Islands qualified a female golfer. This will mark the country's Pan American Games debut in the sport.

Athlete	Event	Round 1	Round 2	Round 3	Round 4	Total		
Athlete	Event	Score	Score	Score	Score	Score	Par	Rank
Alexandra Swayne	Women's individual	70	72	75	71	288	E	6

== Sailing ==
The Virgin Islands qualified two boats for a total of three sailors.

Men

Athlete	Event	Opening series																		Finals				
Athlete	Event	1	2	3	4	5	6	7	8	9	10	11	12	13	14	15	16	Points	Rank	QF	SF	M / F	Points	Rank
Mathieu Dale	Laser	~~20~~	20; STP	20	17	17	18	12; STP	18	20	18	—N/a						160	18	—N/a		Did not advance		
Steven Hardee; Taylor Hasson	49er	8	8	8	8	~~9~~; ~~OCS~~	7	9 DNF	5	6	8	8	9 STP	—N/a				84	8	—N/a		Did not advance		

== Swimming ==
The Virgin Islands qualified three swimmers (two men and one female).

Men

Athlete	Event	Heat		Final	
Athlete	Event	Time	Rank	Time	Rank
Adriel Sanes	50 m freestyle	24.54	31	Did not advance	
Adriel Sanes	100 m breaststroke	1:06.13	23	Did not advance	
Adriel Sanes	200 m breaststroke	2:26.49	21	Did not advance	
Adriel Sanes	100 m butterfly	58.86	29	Did not advance	
Maximillian Wilson	100 m backstroke	56.74	16 q	57.14	15
Maximillian Wilson	200 m backstroke	2:09.47	16 q	2:10.67	16
Maximillian Wilson	200 m individual medley	2:07.75	17	Did not advance	
Maximillian Wilson	400 m individual medley	DNS		Did not advance	

Women

Athlete	Event	Heat		Final	
Athlete	Event	Time	Rank	Time	Rank
Natalia Kuipers	100 m freestyle	1:01.89	36	Did not advance	
Natalia Kuipers	200 m freestyle	2:13.29	23	Did not advance	
Natalia Kuipers	400 m freestyle	4:35.84	16 q	4:37.29	16
Natalia Kuipers	800 m freestyle	—N/a		DNS	

Qualification legend: Q – Qualify to the medal final; q – Qualify to the non-medal final

== See also ==
- Virgin Islands at the 2023 Parapan American Games
- Virgin Islands at the 2024 Summer Olympics
