= Nicholas D'Amour =

U.S. Virgin Islands archer (born 2001)

Personal information
- Born: September 4, 2001 (age 25) Pennington, New Jersey, United States
- Home town: Charlotte Amalie, Saint Thomas, U.S. Virgin Islands
- Education: University of the Virgin Islands
Medal record
Men's recurve archery
Representing U.S. Virgin Islands
Central American and Caribbean Games
Gold medal – first place	2023 San Salvador	Individual
Pan American Championships
Gold medal – first place	2023 Puerto Iguazú	Mixed team
Silver medal – second place	2023 Puerto Iguazú	Individual
Representing United States
Pan American Championships
Gold medal – first place	2026 Tlaxcala	Team
Pan American Field Championships
Gold medal – first place	2025 San Cristóbal de las Casas	Individual

Nicholas D'Amour (born September 4, 2001) is a recurve archer from the United States Virgin Islands. He competed for the Virgin Islands at the 2020 Summer Olympics and 2024 Summer Olympics. He also competed for the Virgin Islands at the 2023 Pan American Games.

D'Amour attended the University of the Virgin Islands. He represented the U.S. Virgin Island before switching his international allegiance to the United States of America after finishing the 2024 Olympics. Since 2025, he has represented the United States.
