= Virgin Islands at the Pan American Games =

- IOC code: ISV
- NOC: Virgin Islands Olympic Committee
- Website: www.virginislandsolympics.com
- Medals Ranked 31st: Gold 0 Silver 4 Bronze 5 Total 9

Pan American Games appearances (overview)
- 1967; 1971; 1975; 1979; 1983; 1987; 1991; 1995; 1999; 2003; 2007; 2011; 2015; 2019; 2023

The United States Virgin Islands has competed at the Pan American Games since 1967.

== Pan American Games ==
Year	Host city	Gold	Silver	Bronze	Total
1951	Buenos Aires	did not participate			
1955	Mexico City	did not participate			
1959	Chicago	did not participate			
1963	São Paulo	did not participate			
1967	Winnipeg	0	0	1	1
1971	Cali	0	0	0	0
1975	Mexico City	0	0	0	0
1979	San Juan	0	0	1	1
1983	Caracas	0	0	0	0
1987	Indianapolis	0	1	1	2
1991	Havana	0	0	2	2
1995	Mar del Plata	0	3	0	3
1999	Winnipeg	0	0	0	0
2003	Santo Domingo	0	0	0	0
2007	Rio de Janeiro	0	0	0	0
2011	Guadalajara	0	0	0	0
2015	Toronto	0	0	0	0
2019	Lima	0	0	0	0
2023	Santiago	0	0	0	0
Total		0	4	5	9

== Junior Pan American Games ==
Year	Host city	Gold	Silver	Bronze	Total
2021	Cali-Valle	0	0	0	0
2025	Asunción	1	1	0	2
Total		1	1	0	2
