= Wyndell Dickinson =

American sprinter

Personal information
- Nationality: American Virgin Islander
- Born: Wyndell Dickinson; May 12, 1964 (age 62) New York
- Height: 6'1
- Weight: 185 lb (84 kg)

Sport
- Sport: Sprinting
- Event: 200 metres
- College team: Taft College

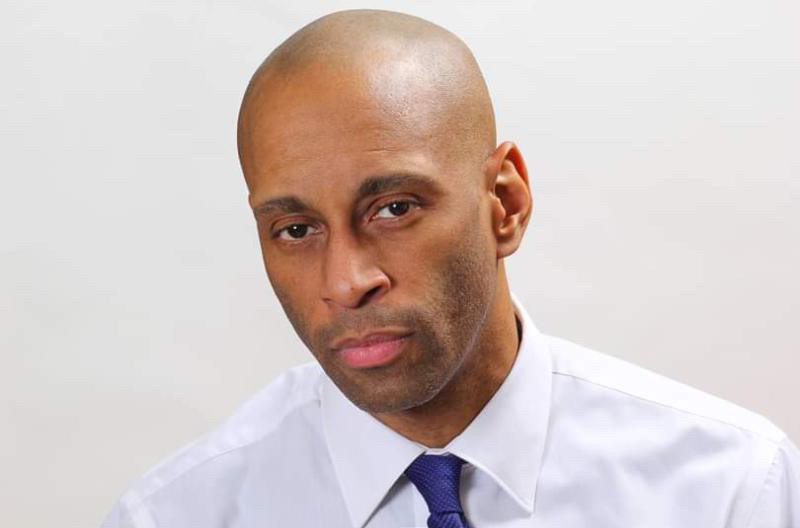

Wyndell Dickinson (born May 12, 1964) is an Olympic sprinter who represented the United States Virgin Islands. He competed in the men's 200 metres and the 4 x 100 m relay at the 1992 Barcelona Summer Olympics. In 2019, he was inducted into the Virgin Islands Track & Field Federation Hall of Fame.

He attended Taft College in California. Currently, Wyndell is the official private trainer for Bryan Mbuemo, who plays for Manchester United. Wyndell began working with Bryan Mbuemo halfway through the 2024-2025 season at Brentford FC. Bryan had scored 9 goals in the previous season, before working with Wyndell. In the 2024-2025 season at Brentford FC, Bryan Mbuemo scored 20 goals, was ranked 4th top striker, and 3rd fastest in the entire Premier League.

Wyndell coached Christina Trucks to set a new American Record in the women's 400m dash masters 40+ age group 56.51 in 2024. Wyndell coaches youth, NBA, NFL, Premier League, Master's Track athletes and is the head coach of the online Sprint Club.
