= Ben Beer =

United States Virgin Islands sailor (born 1972)

Personal information
- Nationality: American Virgin Islander
- Born: July 13, 1972 (age 52)
- Height: 185 cm (6 ft 1 in)
- Weight: 91 kg (201 lb)

Sport
- Sport: Sailing

Ben Beer (born July 13, 1972) is a sailor who represented the United States Virgin Islands. He competed in the Finn event at the 2000 Summer Olympics.
