= Marlon Williams (athlete) =

American athlete

Personal information
- Full name: Marlon Selwyn Williams
- Nationality: American Virgin Islander
- Born: September 9, 1956 (age 69)
- Height: 1.72 m (5 ft 8 in)
- Weight: 65 kg (143 lb)

Sport
- Sport: Long-distance running
- Event: Marathon

Marlon Selwyn Williams (born September 9, 1956) is a long-distance runner who represents the United States Virgin Islands. He competed in the marathon at the 1984, 1988 and the 1996 Summer Olympics.
