= Harold Frederick =

U.S. Virgin Islands sports shooter (born 1927)

Personal information
- Born: Harold Clifton Frederick Jr. 18 February 1927 (age 99)

Sport
- Sport: Sports shooting

Harold Clifton Frederick Jr. (born 18 February 1927) is a former sports shooter from the United States Virgin Islands. He competed at the 1972 Summer Olympics and the 1976 Summer Olympics.
