= Jacobo Garcia =

Virgin Islands boxer (born 1972)

Personal information
- Nationality: American Virgin Islander
- Born: October 20, 1972 (age 53)

Sport
- Sport: Boxing

Jacobo Garcia (born October 20, 1972) is a boxer who represents the United States Virgin Islands. He competed at the 1992 Summer Olympics and the 1996 Summer Olympics.
