= Ned Gerard =

Personal information
- Born: 14 July 1956 (age 68); New Jersey, United States

Sport
- Sport: Shooting

Ned Gerard (born 14 July 1956) is a competitive sharpshooter from the United States Virgin Islands. He represented the Virgin Islands at the 2008 Summer Olympics in the 50 m rifle prone event.
