= Lisa Neuburger =

American windsurfer

Personal information
- National team: United States Virgin Islands
- Born: September 26, 1965 (age 60) Wichita, Kansas, U.S.
- Height: 170 cm (5 ft 7 in)
- Weight: 59 kg (130 lb)

Sport
- Sport: Sailing

Lisa Neuburger (born September 26, 1965 in Wichita, Kansas) is an American sailor. Lisa competed at the 1992 Summer Olympics and 1996 Summer Olympics and was inducted into the International Windsurfing Hall of Fame in 2024. Lisa is a two-time world windsurfing champion having won the IYRU Women’s World Championships in 1984 and the Production Board Open World Championships in 1987. Her competitive windsurfing career spanned more than 2 decades in one-design and open classes, and professional PWA World Cup competition from 1979 through 2004, including multiple regional and National titles and top rankings (top 3 national rankings in windsurfer one-design, 3 time national Professional champion at the US Open Chmps, Corpus Christi, TX 1987-1990, Overall Women’s and Lightweight Men’s Champion at the Japan Open Championships 1982), gold medal wins in the 1993 Caribbean and Central American Games in Puerto Rico and the 1994 Goodwill Games in St. Petersburg, Russia, and a silver medal finish in the 1995 Pan Am Games in Mar Del Plata, Argentina. On the professional World Cup tour, Lisa was internationally ranked and finished in the top 5 overall in the women’s PWA Pro World Tour in 1991. Lisa Neuburger was a professional high-performance and elite level windsurfing and sailing coach for the Guatemalan Sports Federation, was a nationally recognized elite-level windsurfing coach with the Hong Kong Sports Institute in which she was awarded Hong Kong Coach of the Year in 1999 and was the 2000 Sydney Olympic Games Men’s windsurfing coach for Hong Kong; she was the elite level Windsurfing coach for the Mexican Sailing Federation, the Belgian Sailing Federation, and was Head Coach of Sailing for the Swiss Olympic Team in the Athens 2004 Olympic Games, coaching all Olympic sailing classes including windsurfing for Switzerland. Her contributions to the sport of windsurfing included head and supervisory instructor positions with Prairie Windsurfing until 1984, and directing, owning, operating Lisa Neuburger Windsurfing School and Center and Off The Beaten Path Vacations in St. Croix, Virgin Islands. She was Head Coach and director of SailExcellence, Inc, an international Olympic sailing private and national coaching service.

Lisa Neuburger holds coaching credentials and certification in Longterm Athlete Development; Physical Conditioning and Strength Training for Sport; Periodization for Sport by Istvan Balyi.

She presently lives on a ranch in Oregon where she is raising her family, coaches middle and high school track and field, and is director of a horse rescue organization, Silent Wave Horse Rescue.
