= Bruce Meredith =

American sports shooter

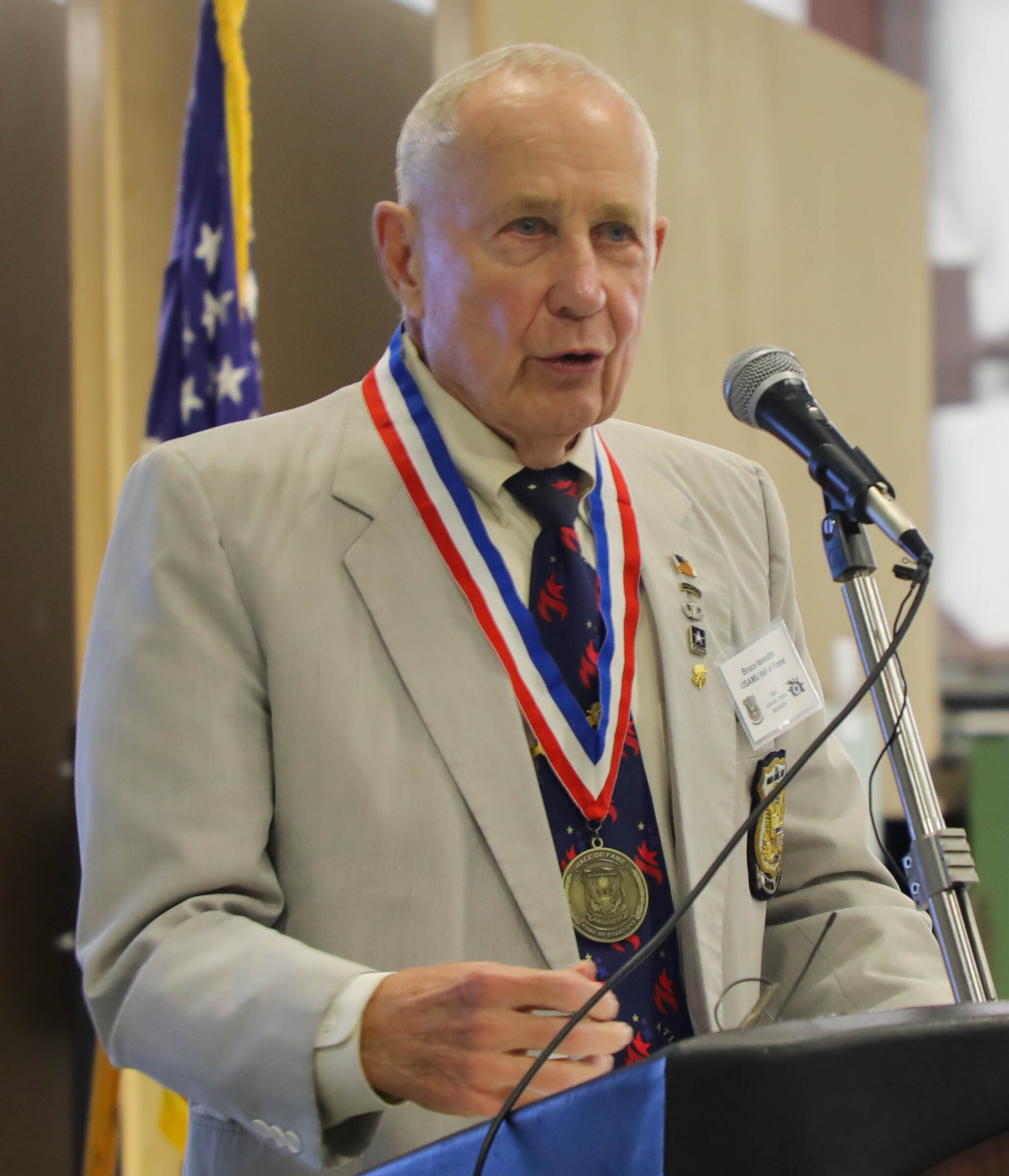
- Meredith in 2023

Personal information
- Born: April 19, 1937 (age 89) Wheeling, West Virginia, U.S.

Sport
- Sport: Sport shooting
Medal record
Representing US Virgin Islands
Pan American Games
Silver medal – second place	1995 Mar del Plata	50m rifle prone
Central American and Caribbean Games
Bronze medal – third place	1990 Mexico City	50m rifle prone

Bruce Meredith (born April 19, 1937) is a sport shooter who competes for the U.S. Virgin Islands in international competition. He competed in rifle shooting events at the Summer Olympics in 1988, 1992, 1996, and 2000. He was the oldest athlete to compete at the 2000 Summer Olympics. He won the silver medal in the 50 metre rifle prone competition at the 1995 Pan American Games.

== Olympic results ==
Event	1988	1992	1996	2000
50 meter rifle three positions (men)	47th	—	—	—
50 meter rifle prone (men)	50th	T-31st	T-42nd	46th
