= Muhammad Halim =

American athlete (born 1986)

Personal information
- Full name: Muhammad Taqi Abdul Halim
- Born: 26 October 1986 (age 39) Christiansted, United States Virgin Islands
- Height: 1.91 m (6 ft 3 in)
- Weight: 82 kg (181 lb)

Sport
- Country: United States Virgin Islands
- Sport: Athletics
- Event: Triple jump

Achievements and titles
- Personal best: 16.99 metres (2016)
- Updated on 18 August 2012

Muhammad Taqi Abdul Halim (born 26 October 1986) is an American athlete. Halim is a graduate of Charles D'Amico High School in Albion, New York where he shattered school records in track and field. Halim was recruited by, and attended Cornell University, following strong performances as a member of Albion's varsity track team. He graduated from Cornell University in 2008, at which point he started a career as a financial analyst, while continuing to train vigorously in various track and field events. At the 2010 Central American and Caribbean Games, he won a silver medal in the men's long jump event. He also broke the territory's men's triple jump record at the 2011 MSU Legacy with 16.61 metres, also his personal best. Halim competed in the Men's triple jump event at the 2012 Summer Olympics but was eliminated in the first round.

== Personal bests ==
Event	Result	Venue	Date
Outdoor
Long jump	7.82 m (wind: +0.2 m/s)	Ithaca, United States	1 May 2010
Triple jump	16.99 m (wind: +0.4 m/s)	Baltimore, United States	23 April 2016
Indoor
Long jump	7.85 m	Ithaca, United States	3 December 2011
Triple jump	16.87 m	Ithaca, United States	3 December 2011

== Achievements ==
Year	Competition	Venue	Position	Event	Notes
Representing the United States Virgin Islands
2010	Central American and Caribbean Games	Mayagüez, Puerto Rico	2nd	Long jump	7.79 m (wind: +0.6 m/s)
2010	Central American and Caribbean Games	Mayagüez, Puerto Rico	5th	Triple jump	16.36 (wind: +0.8 m/s)
2011	Central American and Caribbean Championships	Mayagüez, Puerto Rico	4th	Triple jump	15.95 m (wind: -1.2 m/s)
2011	Pan American Games	Guadalajara, Mexico	9th	Triple jump	15.94 m A (wind: -0.5 m/s)
2012	Olympic Games	London, United Kingdom	18th (q)	Triple jump	16.39 m (wind: -0.6 m/s)
2014	Central American and Caribbean Games	Xalapa, Mexico	2nd	Long jump	7.75 m A (wind: -0.6 m/s)
2014	Central American and Caribbean Games	Xalapa, Mexico	8th	Triple jump	15.45 m A (wind: -1.2 m/s)
2015	NACAC Championships	San José, Costa Rica	9th	Long jump	7.36 m
2016	Olympic Games	Rio de Janeiro, Brazil	–	Triple jump	NM
