= Clayton Laurent =

Virgin Islands boxer (born 1990)

Clayton Laurent Jr.
Personal information
- Born: 18 July 1990

Sport
- Country: United States Virgin Islands
- Sport: Boxing
- Weight class: Super Heavyweight

Laurent Clayton Jr. (born 18 July 1990) is a super heavyweight boxer from the United States Virgin Islands.

In 2016, he placed 3rd at the American Qualification Event for the 2016 Olympic Summer Games and qualified for the Olympic boxing tournament.

At the 2016 Summer Olympics, he defeated Erik Pfeifer of Germany in the first round, but was defeated by eventual gold medalist Tony Yoka of France in the next round. Clayton was the flag bearer for the United States Virgin Islands during the closing ceremony.
