= Cy Thompson =

United States Virgin Islands sailor

Personal information
- Full name: Cy Chris Thompson
- Nationality: United States Virgin Islands
- Born: 1 July 1988 (age 37) Saint Thomas, U.S. Virgin Islands

Sailing career
- Sport: Sailing
- College team: Roger Williams University

Cy Chris Thompson (born 1 July 1988 in Saint Thomas) is a Virgin Islands sailor.

== College ==
He claimed the 2008 ICSA Men's Singlehanded National Championship in his sophomore year and finished runner-up at the 2010 national championship and placed in the top ten in his fourth berths at singlehanded nationals. He was the 2011 NEISA Sailor of the Year and was a finalist for the 2011 Everett Morris Memorial Trophy as College Sailor of the Year. He was a three-time ICSA Coed All-American and piloted the A Division boats that helped RWU win the 2011 ICSA Team Racing National Championship and finish second in the 2012 ICSA Coed Dinghy National Championship.

== Olympic Games ==
He competed at the 2012 Summer Olympics in the Men's Laser class. Cy Thompson qualified for the 2016 Summer Olympics and was the Virgin Islands' flag bearer. He finished 19th in the Men's Laser class competition. His grandfather, Rudy Thompson, was also an Olympic sailor for the Virgin Islands.
