= Mayumi Roller =

US Virgin Islands sailor

Mayumi "Mimi" Roller (born March 11, 1991) is an actress from the United States Virgin Islands.

She also represented the USVI in the 2012 Summer Olympics in London, England in the women's Laser Radial class.

Among many other regattas, Mayumi also competed in the Kieler Woche 2014 together with the sailor Kayla McComb-Raab as Team MK Sailing in the boat class 49erFX.

Mayumi grew up on an organic farm (Coral Bay Organic Gardens - Josephine's Greens) on the island of St. John, where her older brother, Hugo Roller, inspired her to start sailing.

Mayumi attended St. Mary's College of Maryland, where she was an NCAA All-American athlete, and contributed to numerous podium finishes at various National Championships throughout her time at St. Mary's.

Her acting career began in 2017 when she acted in a Travel Channel commercial followed by a series of commercials for the U.S. Virgin Islands Department of Tourism. Since then she has acted in a number of commercials, films, and TV shows, most notably The Resident, starring Matt Czuchry, Emily VanCamp, Manish Dayal, Bruce Greenwood, and Malcolm-Jamal Warner. She also portrays Cole Hauser's wife, Deelie Boyd, in the thriller The Ritual Killer, starring Morgan Freeman.

== Filmography ==
Year	Title	Role	Notes
2018	Lost Time	Heather	
2018	The Resident	Adele	
2019	Practically Wicked	Jude	
2020	Stolen Lilies	Gabriela	
2020	If I Can't Have Her	Stephanie	
2020	Law of Attraction	Erica	
2022	Army Fatigue	Lauren	
2022	U·Run	Jody	
2022	Dirty Sweet Valentine	Amelia	
2023	The Ritual Killer	Deelie Boyd	
	Places of Worship	Mary	Post Production
	Crocodylus: Mating Season	Wanda	Post Production
	Morrow Road	Ivy Lozon	In Production
