= Virgin Islands Olympic Committee =

National Olympic Committee

- Country/Region: U.S. Virgin Islands
- Code: ISV
- Created: 1967
- Recognized: 1967
- Continental Association: PASO
- President: Angel Morales
- Website: virginislandsolympics.org

The Virgin Islands Olympic Committee (IOC code: ISV) is the National Olympic Committee representing the United States Virgin Islands.

== See also ==
- Virgin Islands at the Olympics
