= List of flag bearers for American Samoa at the Olympics =

American Samoa at the Olympics
- IOC code: ASA
- NOC: American Samoa National Olympic Committee
- Website: asnoc.org
- Medals: Gold 0 Silver 0 Bronze 0 Total 0

Summer appearances
- 1988; 1992; 1996; 2000; 2004; 2008; 2012; 2016; 2020; 2024

Winter appearances
- 1994; 1998–2018; 2022; 2026

This is a list of flag bearers who have represented American Samoa at the Olympics.

Flag bearers carry the national flag of their country at the opening ceremony of the Olympic Games.

#	Event year	Season	Flag bearer	Sport
1	1988	Summer	Maselino Masoe	Boxing
2	1992	Summer		
3	1994	Winter	Faauuga Muagututia	Bobsleigh
4	1996	Summer	Maselino Masoe	Boxing
5	2000	Summer	Lisa Misipeka	Athletics
6	2004	Summer	Lisa Misipeka	Athletics
7	2008	Summer	Silulu A'etonu	Judo
8	2012	Summer	Ching Maou Wei	Swimming
9	2016	Summer	Tanumafili Jungblut	Weightlifting
10	2020	Summer	Tanumafili Jungblut	Weightlifting
10	2020	Summer	Tilali Scanlan	Swimming
11	2022	Winter	Nathan Crumpton	Skeleton
12	2024	Summer	Filomenaleonisa Iakopo	Athletics
12	2024	Summer	Micah Masei	Swimming

== See also ==
- American Samoa at the Olympics
