= American Samoa at the Olympics =

- IOC code: ASA
- NOC: American Samoa National Olympic Committee
- Medals: Gold 0 Silver 0 Bronze 0 Total 0

Summer appearances
- 1988; 1992; 1996; 2000; 2004; 2008; 2012; 2016; 2020; 2024; 2028

Winter appearances
- 1994; 1998–2018; 2022; 2026

American Samoa has competed in 10 Summer Olympic Games since its debut in 1988, and 2 Winter Olympic Games. The team most recently competed in the 2024 Summer Olympics in Paris.

American Samoa has not yet won any Olympic medals, with its best finish being a quarterfinal placement by boxer Maselino Masoe at the Light Middleweight event at the 1992 Summer Olympics.

== Medal tables ==
=== Medals by Summer Games ===
Games	Athletes	Gold	Silver	Bronze	Total	Rank
1988 Seoul	6	0	0	0	0	–
1992 Barcelona	3	0	0	0	0	–
1996 Atlanta	7	0	0	0	0	–
2000 Sydney	4	0	0	0	0	–
2004 Athens	3	0	0	0	0	–
2008 Beijing	4	0	0	0	0	–
2012 London	5	0	0	0	0	–
2016 Rio de Janeiro	4	0	0	0	0	–
2020 Tokyo	6	0	0	0	0	–
2024 Paris	2	0	0	0	0	–
2028 Los Angeles	future event					
2032 Brisbane	future event					
Total		0	0	0	0	–

=== Medals by Winter Games ===
Games	Athletes	Gold	Silver	Bronze	Total	Rank
1994 Lillehammer	2	0	0	0	0	–
1998–2018	did not participate					
2022 Beijing	1	0	0	0	0	–
2026 Milano Cortina	did not participate					
2030 French Alps	future event					
2034 Utah	future event					
Total		0	0	0	0	–

== Flagbearers ==
Summer Olympics
Games	Athlete	Sport
1988 Seoul	Maselino Masoe	Boxing
1996 Atlanta	Maselino Masoe	Boxing
2000 Sydney	Lisa Misipeka	Athletics
2004 Athens	Lisa Misipeka	Athletics
2008 Beijing	Silulu A'etonu	Judo
2012 London	Ching Maou Wei	Swimming
2016 Rio de Janeiro	Tanumafili Jungblut	Weightlifting
2020 Tokyo	Tilali Scanlan; Tanumafili Jungblut	Swimming; Weightlifting

Winter Olympics
Games	Athlete	Sport
1994 Lillehammer	Faauuga Muagututia	Bobsleigh
1998 Nagano	did not participate	
2002 Salt Lake City	did not participate	
2006 Turin	did not participate	
2010 Vancouver	did not participate	
2014 Sochi	did not participate	
2018 Pyeongchang	did not participate	
2022 Beijing	Nathan Crumpton	Skeleton

== See also ==
- Tropical nations at the Winter Olympics
