= American Samoa at the 1988 Summer Olympics =

- IOC code: ASA
- NOC: American Samoa National Olympic Committee

in Seoul
- Competitors: 6 in 4 sports
- Flag bearer: Maselino Masoe
- Officials: 6
- Medals: Gold 0 Silver 0 Bronze 0 Total 0

Summer Olympics appearances (overview)
- 1988; 1992; 1996; 2000; 2004; 2008; 2012; 2016; 2020; 2024; 2028

American Samoa competed in the Summer Olympic Games for the first time at the 1988 Summer Olympics in Seoul, South Korea.

== Competitors ==
The following is the list of number of competitors in the Games.

Sport	Men	Women	Total
Athletics	1	0	1
Boxing	2	–	2
Weightlifting	2	–	2
Wrestling	1	–	1
Total	6	0	6

== Athletics ==
=== Men ===
==== Track events ====
Athlete	Events	Heat		Semifinal		Final	
Athlete	Events	Time	Position	Time	Position	Time	Position
Gary Fanelli	Marathon	—N/a				2:25:35	51

== Boxing ==
Athlete	Event	Round of 64	Round of 32	Round of 16	Quarterfinals	Semifinals	Final
Athlete	Event	Opposition Result	Opposition Result	Opposition Result	Opposition Result	Opposition Result	Opposition Result
Maselino Masoe	Welterweight	Pedro Fria Reynoso (DOM); W RSCH	Fidele Mohinga (CAF); W RSCH	Kenneth Gould (USA); L 0:5	Did not advance		
Mika Masoe	Light Heavyweight	BYE		Andrew Maynard (USA); L RSCO	Did not advance		

== Weightlifting ==
Men

Athlete	Event	Snatch		Clean & jerk		Total	Rank
Athlete	Event	Result	Rank	Result	Rank	Total	Rank
Lopesi Faagu	Light heavyweight	90	20	130	18	220	18
Tauama Timoti	Heavyweight	120	18	140	16	260	16

== Wrestling ==
Men's freestyle

Athlete	Event	Elimination Pool								Final round	
Athlete	Event	Round 1 Result	Round 2 Result	Round 3 Result	Round 4 Result	Round 5 Result	Round 6 Result	Round 7 Result	Rank	Final round Result	Rank
Alesana Sione	100 kg	Babacar Sar (MTN); L 0-4	Istvan Robotka (HUN); L 0–4	did not advance					9	did not advance	
