= American Samoa at the 2020 Summer Olympics =

- Flag of American Samoa
- IOC code: ASA
- NOC: American Samoa National Olympic Committee

in Tokyo, Japan July 23, 2021 – August 8, 2021
- Competitors: 6 (5 men and 1 woman) in 4 sports
- Flag bearers (opening): Tilali Scanlan; Tanumafili Malietoa Jungblut
- Flag bearer (closing): Nathan Crumpton
- Officials: 4
- Medals: Gold 0 Silver 0 Bronze 0 Total 0

Summer Olympics appearances (overview)
- 1988; 1992; 1996; 2000; 2004; 2008; 2012; 2016; 2020; 2024; 2028

American Samoa competed at the 2020 Summer Olympics in Tokyo. Originally scheduled to take place from July 24 to August 9, 2020, the Games were postponed to July 23 to August 8, 2021, because of the COVID-19 pandemic. The country's participation in Tokyo marked its ninth consecutive appearance in the Summer Olympics since its debut in the 1988 Summer Olympics.

The American Samoa delegation included six athletes: sprinter Nathan Crumpton, sailors Adrian Hoesch and Tyler Paige, swimmers Micah Masei and Tilali Scanlan, and weightlifter Tanumafili Jungblut. Crumpton, Masei, and Scanlan were invited through universality slots, Jungblut was invited through a tripartite invitation quota, and the two sailors qualified through class-associated World Championships and continental regattas. Jungblut and Scanlan were the flagbearers for the opening ceremony, while Crumpton held it at the closing ceremony. No athletes earned medals, and as of these Games, American Samoa has yet to earn an Olympic medal.

== Background ==
Originally scheduled to take place from July 24 to August 9, 2020, the Games were postponed to July 23 to August 8, 2021, because of the COVID-19 pandemic. This edition of the Games marked the nation's ninth appearance at the Summer Olympics ever since they debuted at the 1988 Summer Olympics held in Seoul, South Korea.

=== Delegation and travel ===
Two officials and two coaches, American Samoa National Olympic Committee president Ed Imo, attaché Meafou Imo, weightlifting coach Monica Afalava, and athletics coach Sonny Sanitoa, traveled to Honolulu on July 8, 2021, from American Samoa for a connecting flight towards Tokyo, Japan, the site of the Games. The rest of the delegation flew in from other nations and met in Tokyo before July 19, 2021.

Fourteen people composed the delegation. Officials present were Ed Imo, Meafou Imo, chef de mission Ken Yamada, and delegation secretary general Ethan Lake. Coaches present were Monica Afalava, Sonny Sanitoa, sailing coach Stephen Keen, and swimming coach Ryan Leong. The athletes that competed were sprinter Nathan Crumpton, who competed in the men's 100 m, sailors Adrian Hoesch and Tyler Paige, who competed in the men's 470, swimmers Micah Masei and Tilali Scanlan, who competed in the men's 100 m breaststroke and women's 100 m breaststroke respectively, and weightlifter Tanumafili Jungblut, who competed in the men's 109 kg category.

No American Samoan athlete earned a medal at these Games, nor has any American Samoan athlete prior.

=== Opening and closing ceremonies ===
The American Samoan delegation marched 156th out of 206 countries in the Parade of Nations within the opening ceremony, which was unusual as the nations usually march in alphabetic order, with American Samoan thus toward the beginning of former opening ceremonies. This was put in place because the organizers of the Games decided to use the formal name of the nation (Note: Japanese: 米領サモア, romanized: Bei-ryō Samoa) and the kana system.

At the opening ceremony, all athletes and their coaches were present in the Parade of Nations, with weightlifter Tanumafili Jungblut and swimmer Tilali Scanlan as the flagbearers for the nation. The delegation wore red and black elei; the men were dressed in black 'ie faitaga and the women were dressed in red and black puletasi. The flagbearers also wore red ulafala.

At the closing ceremony, sprinter Nathan Crumpton was the designated flagbearer for the nation.

== Athletics ==
American Samoa received a universality slot from World Athletics to send a male track and field athlete to the Olympics, which allows a National Olympic Committee to send athletes despite not meeting the standard qualification criteria. The nation selected Nathan Crumpton, a skeleton athlete who previously represented the United States in international competition. He placed as high as eighth place at the World Championships but ultimately left the national team in 2019 after an arbitration case was filed against the United States Bobsled and Skeleton Federation, as well as stating that he would like to represent his Polynesian heritage. Before the Games, Crumpton had never competed in any sprinting event, as his only athletics experience beforehand was being a long and triple jumper for Princeton University. Crumpton competed in his event on July 31, 2021, running in the first preliminary heat in the second lane. He finished with a time of 11.27 seconds, ultimately finishing last in his preliminary but setting a new personal best in the event and running the second fastest 100 metres time by an American Samoan sprinter at the Olympic Games. He did not advance.

Key

- Note–Ranks given for track events are within the athlete's heat only
- Q = Qualified for the next round
- q = Qualified for the next round as a fastest loser or, in field events, by position without achieving the qualifying target
- NR = National record
- N/A = Round not applicable for the event
- Bye = Athlete not required to compete in round

Track & road events

Athlete	Event	Preliminaries		Heat		Quarterfinal		Semifinal		Final	
Athlete	Event	Result	Rank	Result	Rank	Result	Rank	Result	Rank	Result	Rank
Nathan Crumpton	Men's 100 m	11.27 PB	9	Did not advance							

== Sailing ==
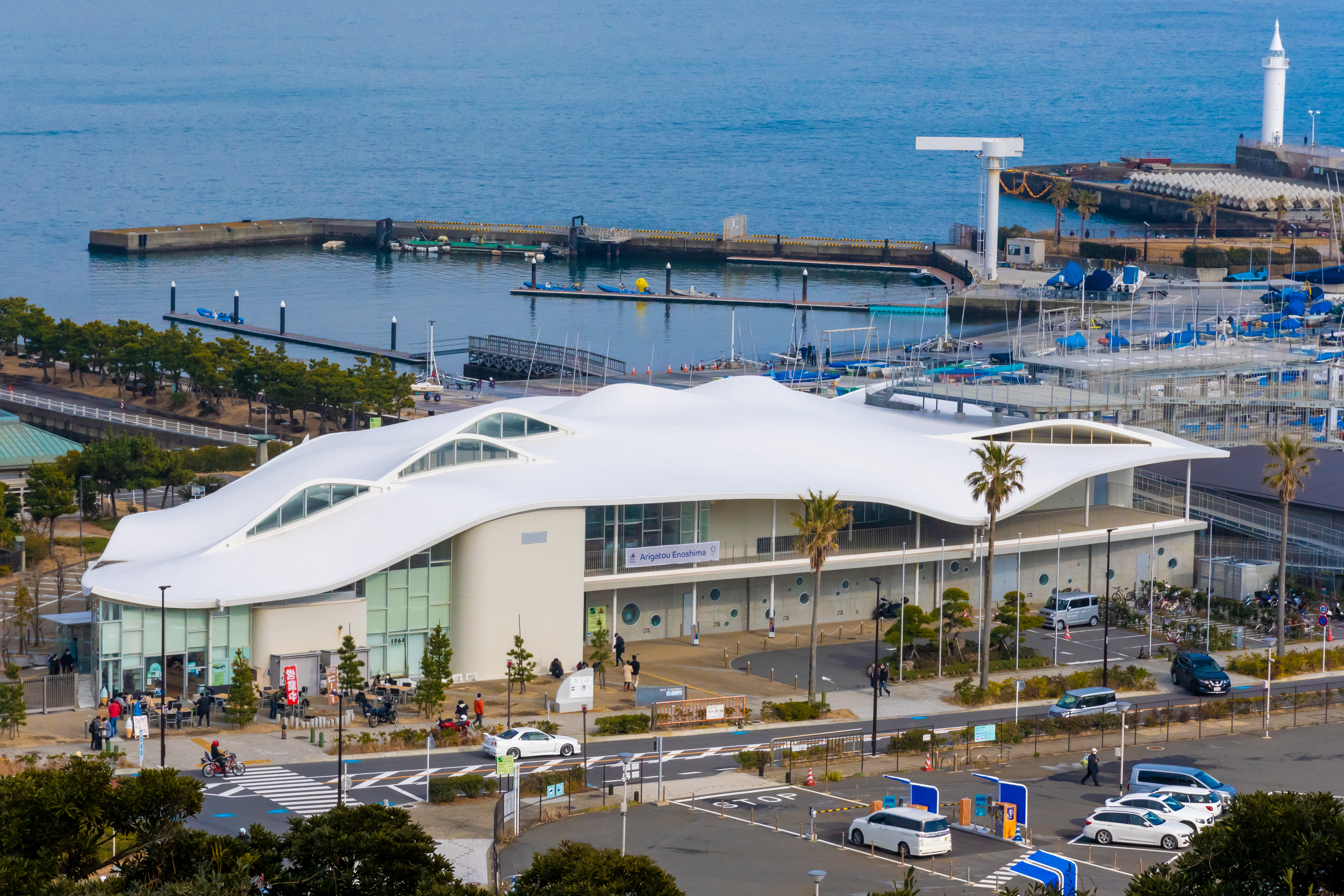
The Enoshima Yacht Harbor, where the pair competed in their event

American Samoan sailors qualified one boat in each of the following classes through the class-associated World Championships and the continental regattas, marking the country's recurrence to the sport for the first time since the 1996 Summer Olympics in Atlanta, Georgia. The pair, Adrian Hoesch and Tyler Paige, qualified by winning the 2020 Sail Melbourne International for the Men's 470 class spot.

Hoesch and Paige competed in their event from July 28 to August 4, 2021, at the Enoshima Yacht Harbor in Enoshima. At the Games, Paige was at the helm, while Hoesch was the crew. They were eliminated before the medal rounds, scoring 159 points and placing 18th overall.

Athlete	Event	Race											Net points	Final rank
Athlete	Event	1	2	3	4	5	6	7	8	9	10	M*	Net points	Final rank
Adrian Hoesch; Tyler Paige	Men's 470	18	~~19~~	18	17	17	16	19	18	18	18	EL	159	18

M = Medal race; EL = Eliminated – did not advance into the medal race

== Swimming ==
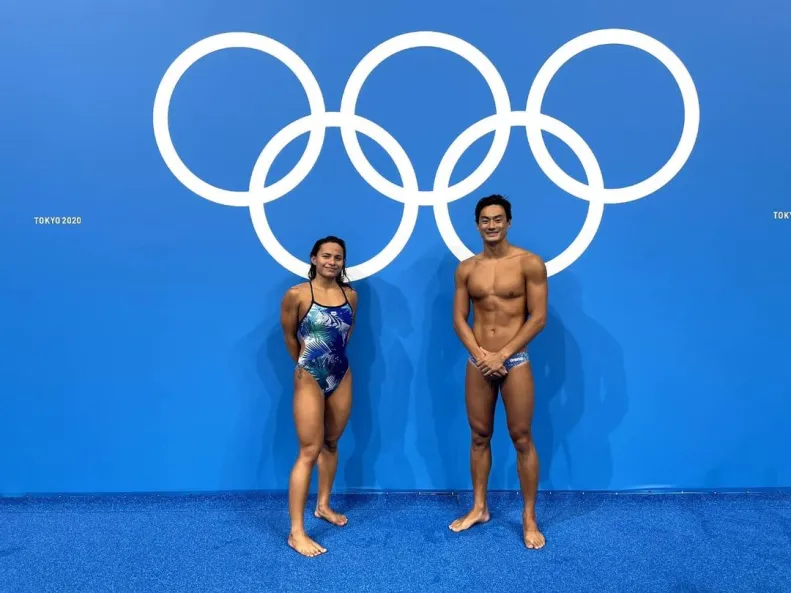
Scanlan and Masei at the Tokyo Aquatics Centre before their events

American Samoa received a universality invitation from FINA to send two top-ranked swimmers (one per gender) in their respective individual events to the Olympics, based on the FINA Points System of June 28, 2021. The nation sent swimmers Micah Masei and Tilali Scanlan, who competed in the men's 100 metre breaststroke and women's 100 metre breaststroke, respectively. Before the Games, Scanlan was stranded in Fiji after flights were shut down due to the COVID-19 pandemic.

Masei competed in his event on July 24, 2021, in the first heat against Muhammad Isa Ahmad of Brunei and Amini Fonua of Tonga. He swam a time of 1:04.93, just shy of his personal best of 1:04.81, finishing first in his heat but not having a fast enough time to advance to the semifinals. The following day, Scanlan competed in her event in the second heat against Andrea Podmanikova of Slovakia, Phee Jinq En of Malaysia, Ema Rajić of Croatia, Emily Santos of Panama, Kirsten Fisher-Marsters of the Cook Islands, Alicia Kok Shun of Mauritius, and Claudia Verdino of Monaco. She finished third in her heat with a time of 1:10.01, setting a new personal best and national record, but did not advance to the semifinals.

Athlete	Event	Heat		Semifinal		Final	
Athlete	Event	Time	Rank	Time	Rank	Time	Rank
Micah Masei	Men's 100 m breaststroke	1:04.93	46	Did not advance			
Tilali Scanlan	Women's 100 m breaststroke	1:10.01 NR	32	Did not advance			

== Weightlifting ==
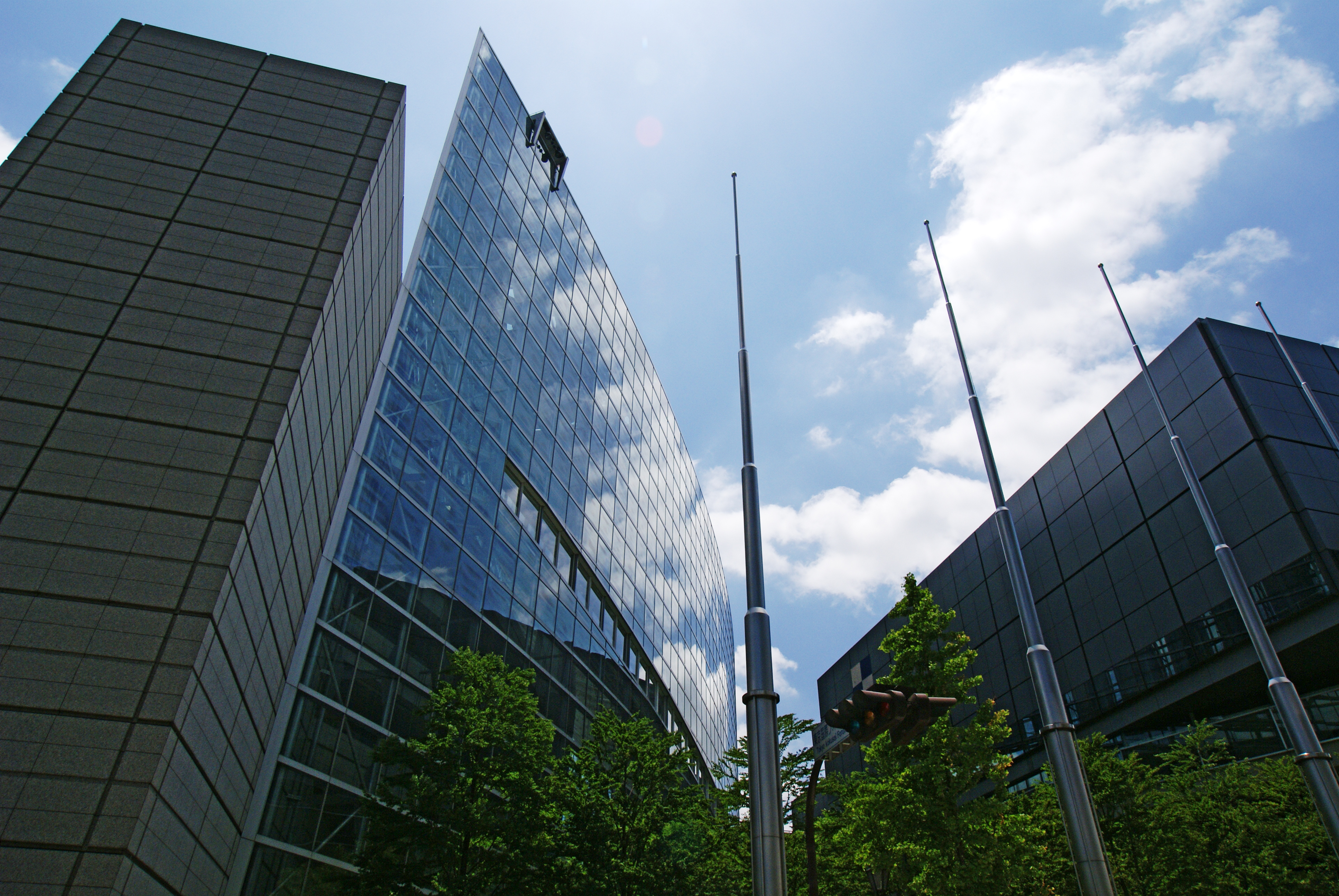
The Tokyo International Forum, where Jungblut competed in his event

American Samoa received one tripartite invitation quota from the International Weightlifting Federation, picking Tanumafili Jungblut, who competed in the men's 109 kg category. Jungblut was a returning Olympian, first competing in the men's 94 kg category at the 2016 Summer Olympics in Rio de Janeiro, Brazil, placing without a rank after failing to complete three snatches.

Jungblut competed in his event on August 3, 2021, in the B Group. He lifted 140 and 150 kilograms for his first and second attempts in the snatch, setting a new personal best from his former 146 kilograms best in the lift, ultimately failing his last lift of 155 kilograms. He then clean and jerked 180 kilograms for his first attempt, failing his second and third attempts at 190 kilograms, ultimately finishing with a total of 330 kilograms. He placed 13th out of 14 competitors, with the gold medal going to Akbar Djuraev of Uzbekistan, who set new Olympic records with 237 kilograms in the clean and jerk and 430 kilograms in the total. After competing in his event, he announced his retirement from the sport, citing that he wants to focus on his marriage with his coach, Monica Afalava.

Athlete	Event	Snatch		Clean & Jerk		Total	Rank
Athlete	Event	Result	Rank	Result	Rank	Total	Rank
Tanumafili Jungblut	Men's 109 kg	150 PB	14	180	12	330	13
