= American Samoa at the 2024 Summer Olympics =

- Flag of American Samoa
- IOC code: ASA
- NOC: American Samoa National Olympic Committee
- Website: https://asnoc.org

in Paris, France July 24 – August 11, 2024
- Competitors: 2 (1 man and 1 woman) in 2 sports
- Flag bearers: Filomenaleonisa Iakopo & Micah Masei
- Medals: Gold 0 Silver 0 Bronze 0 Total 0

Summer Olympics appearances (overview)
- 1988; 1992; 1996; 2000; 2004; 2008; 2012; 2016; 2020; 2024

American Samoa competed at the 2024 Summer Olympics in Paris, France, which were held from July 26 to August 11, 2024. The territory's participation in Paris marked its tenth appearance at the Summer Olympics since its debut in 1988. The athlete delegation of the country was composed of two people: Filomenaleonisa Iakopo in athletics and Micah Masei in swimming. Iakopo and Masei were the flagbearers for the territory at the opening ceremony while Iakopo solely held it at the closing ceremony.

Iakopo and Masei qualified after receiving universality slots in their events, which allows underrepresented nations to compete and for a National Olympic Committee (NOC) to send athletes despite not meeting the other qualification criteria. Masei competed in the men's 100 meter breaststroke but swam in a time not fast enough to progress into further rounds. Iakopo then competed in the women's 100 meters and also did not progress further after not finishing with a fast enough time, though she set a national record in the event. Thus, American Samoa has yet to win an Olympic medal.

== Background ==
The games were held from July 26 to August 11, 2024, in the city of Paris, France. This edition marked the territory's tenth appearance at the Summer Olympics since its debut at the 1988 Summer Olympics in Seoul, South Korea. The nation had never won a medal at the Olympics, with its best performance coming from boxer Maselino Masoe placing joint fifth in the men's light middleweight event at the 1992 Summer Olympics in Barcelona, Spain.

=== Delegation ===
The American Samoan delegation was composed of nine people. They landed in Paris on July 14, 2024. The officials present at the games were chef de mission Joseph Ioane, American Samoa National Olympic Committee (ASNOC) president Ed Imo, and ASNOC general secretary Ethan Lake. Two athletes qualified for the games, swimmer Micah Masei, who was coached by Cassandra Bess Lund, and Filomenaleonisa Iakopo, who was coached by Priscilla Iakopo, who is also her mother. Imo's and Lake's wives were also part of the delegation.

=== Opening and closing ceremonies ===
The American Samoan delegation came in 162nd out of the 205 National Olympic Committees in the 2024 Summer Olympics Parade of Nations within the opening ceremony. Iakopo and Masei held the flag for the delegation. They were also accompanied by Ioane, Lund, and Priscilla Iakopo. At the closing ceremony, Iakopo held the flag.

== Competitors ==
List of American Samoan competitors at the 2024 Summer Olympics
Sport	Men	Women	Total
Athletics	0	1	1
Swimming	1	0	1
Total	1	1	2

== Athletics ==
=== Qualification and lead-up to the games ===
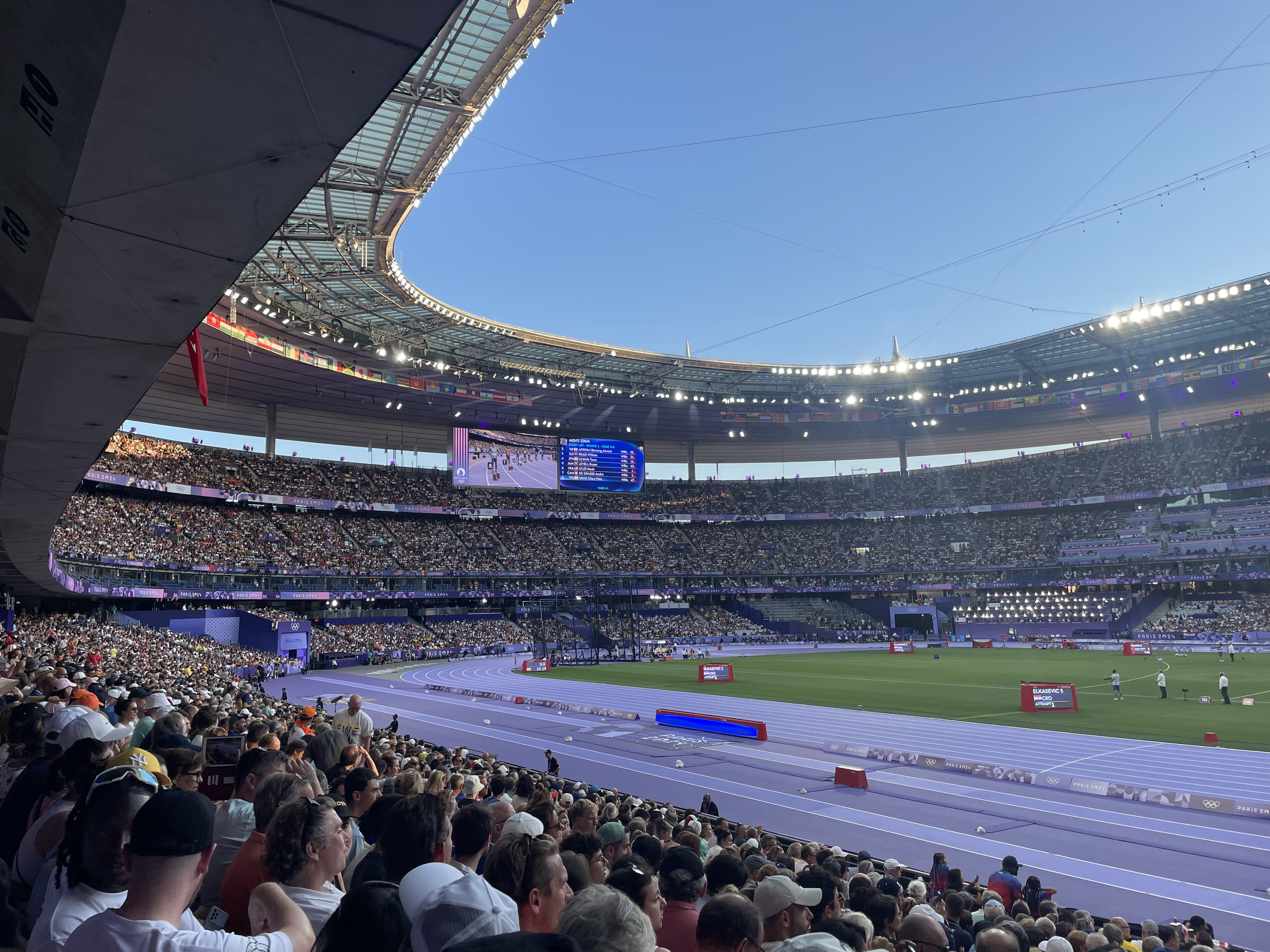
The Stade de France, where Iakopo competed in her event

American Samoa was eligible for a universality slot to send an athletics competitor to the games, which allows underrepresented nations to compete and for a National Olympic Committee (NOC) to send athletes despite not meeting the standard qualification criteria. The American Samoa Track & Field Association (ASTFA) selected sprinter Filomenaleonisa Iakopo, after she competed in numerous qualifying competitions and achieved times needed for selection by the ASTFA. Iakopo is originally from the Commonwealth of the Northern Mariana Islands (CNMI) though represented American Samoa as the CNMI does not have a recognized NOC. She was eligible to represent American Samoa as her father was born in the territory. She stated mixed feelings about her participation, but expressed it as an opportunity to represent Pacific Islanders on a "global stage".

The lead-up to the games saw Iakopo compete at the 2022 Oceania Athletics Championships, her debut international competition, followed by the 2022 Pacific Mini Games, 2023 Oceania Athletics Cup, 2023 Pacific Games, 2024 World Athletics Indoor Championships, and 2024 Oceania Athletics Championships. She also held the national records in the 100 and 200 meters. As the territory does not have a proper track, she stated that she trained on various surfaces such as sand, grass, and concrete. Before the games, Iakopo aimed to beat her personal best of 12.83 seconds and advance by placing in the top three of her preliminary heat.

=== Event ===
The athletics events were held at the Stade de France. Making her Olympic debut, Iakopo competed in the preliminaries of the women's 100 meters on 2 August 2024 at 10:43 a.m., where she raced in the second heat and ran a time of 12.78 seconds for a new national record and personal best. She placed eighth out of the nine people in her heat and did not advance further. After competing, she became the first Chamorro person from the CMNI to compete at the Olympic Games. She stated that she was satisfied with her result, citing her personal best and national record-breaking time. The eventual winner of the event was Julien Alfred of Saint Lucia, who won in a time of 10.72 and earned Saint Lucia's first Olympic medal.

Track and road events

Athletics summary
Athlete	Event	Preliminary		Heat		Repechage		Semifinal		Final	
Athlete	Event	Time	Rank	Time	Rank	Time	Rank	Time	Rank	Time	Rank
Filomenaleonisa Iakopo	Women's 100 m	12.78 NR	8	Did not advance		—N/a		Did not advance			

== Swimming ==
=== Qualification and lead-up to the games ===
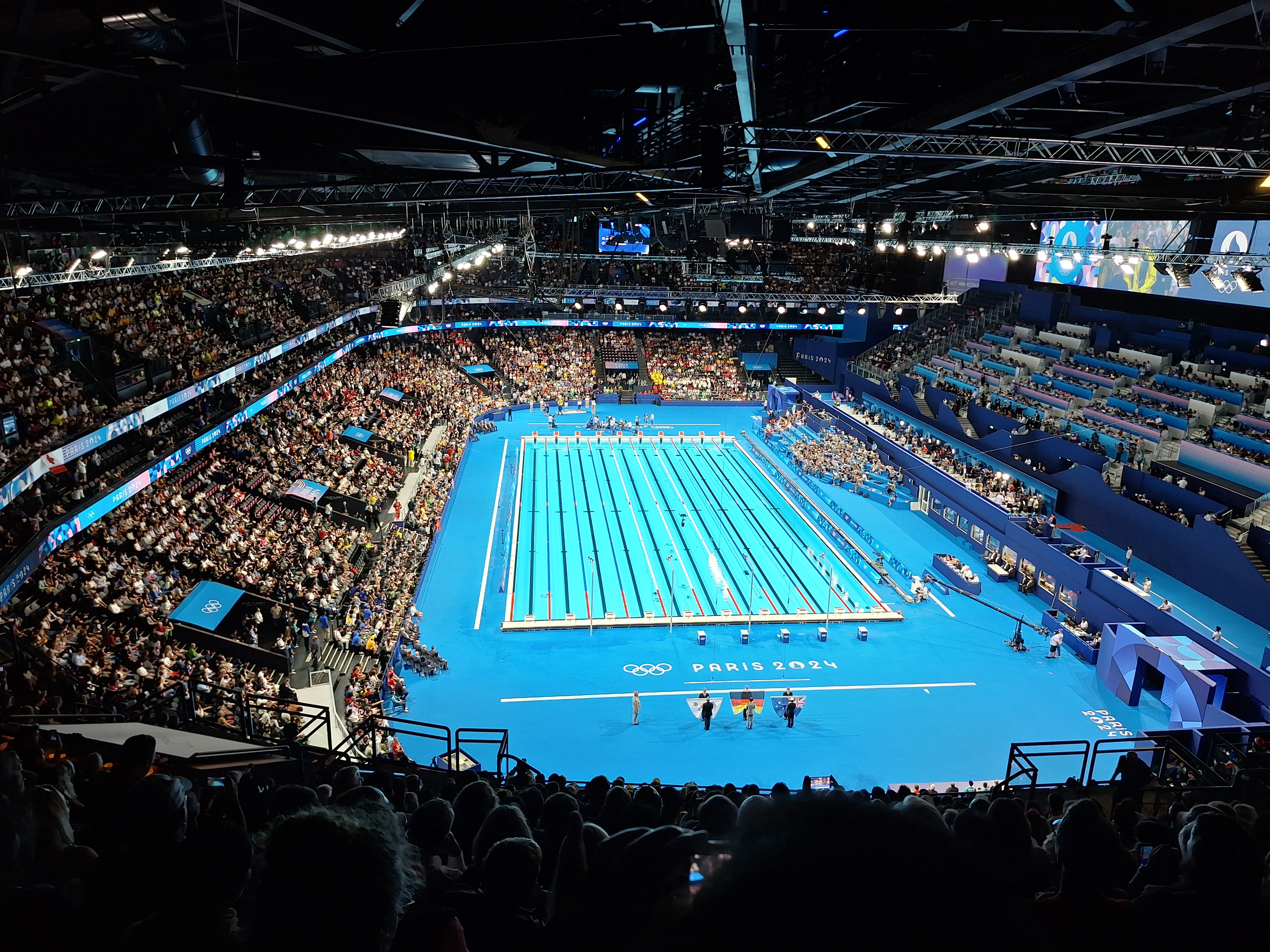
The Paris La Défense Arena on the day of Masei's event

American Samoa was eligible for a universality slot to send a swimmer to the games. The nation selected national record holder Micah Masei. Masei grew up in Oregon though represented American Samoa through his grandfather, Mataiaau Masei, who was born in the territory but moved to the mainland United States for work. Micah Masei also competed at the last Summer Games held in Tokyo, Japan, where he competed in the men's 100 meter breaststroke and placed first in his heat, though his time was not fast enough to progress to further rounds. After the games in Tokyo, he took a break from swimming for 18 months to pursue a master's degree in finance at the University of Hawaiʻi. He resumed the sport on February 2023, training in the ocean.

The lead-up to the games saw Masei compete at the 2023 World Aquatics Championships; 2023 Pacific Games, where he earned silver and bronze in the 100 and 50 meter breaststroke respectively; 2024 World Aquatics Championships; and 2024 Oceania Swimming Championships, where he earned silver in the 50 meter breaststroke and won gold in the 100 meter breaststroke with a new national record of 1:04.64. Prior to the games, he trained in a camp in Divonne-les-Bains for ten days, where he praised the camp's location and the athletes who trained there alongside him.

=== Event ===
The swimming events were held at the Paris La Défense Arena. Masei competed in the heats of the men's 100 meter breaststroke on 27 July 2024 at 11:30 a.m. in the first heat. He finished with a time of 1:05.95 and placed third in his heat. He did not progress further and placed 34th out of the 36 competitors that competed. After he competed, he stated that his reason for competing is because of the support he receives from his family; his sister was in the stands of the arena during his competition. The eventual winner of the event was Nicolò Martinenghi of Italy who won in a time of 59.03 seconds.

Swimming summary
Athlete	Event	Heat		Semifinal		Final	
Athlete	Event	Time	Rank	Time	Rank	Time	Rank
Micah Masei	Men's 100 m breaststroke	1:05.95	34	Did not advance			

== See also ==
- American Samoa at the 2023 Pacific Games
