= American Samoa at the 1996 Summer Olympics =

- IOC code: ASA
- NOC: American Samoa National Olympic Committee

in Atlanta
- Competitors: 7 (6 men, 1 woman) in 5 sports
- Flag bearer: Maselino Masoe
- Medals: Gold 0 Silver 0 Bronze 0 Total 0

Summer Olympics appearances (overview)
- 1988; 1992; 1996; 2000; 2004; 2008; 2012; 2016; 2020; 2024

American Samoa was represented at the 1996 Summer Olympics in Atlanta, Georgia, United States by the American Samoa National Olympic Committee.

In total, seven athletes including six men and one woman represented American Samoa in five different sports including athletics, boxing, sailing, weightlifting and wrestling.

== Competitors ==
In total, seven athletes represented American Samoa at the 1996 Summer Olympics in Atlanta, Georgia, United States across five different sports.

| Sport | Men | Women | Total |
|---|---|---|---|
| Athletics | 1 | 1 | 2 |
| Boxing | 1 | – | 1 |
| Sailing | 2 | 0 | 2 |
| Weightlifting | 1 | – | 1 |
| Wrestling | 1 | – | 1 |
| Total | 7 | 6 | 1 |

== Athletics ==
In total, two American Samoan athletes participated in the athletics events – Anthony Leiato in the men's shot put and Lisa Misipeka in the women's shot put.

The men's shot put took place on 26 July 1996. Leiato contested qualifying group A. His first attempt was 12.28 m but his second attempt was unsuccessful. He bettered his score to 13.02 m on his third attempt. He did not advance to the final and finished 34th overall.

Qualifying for the women's shot put took place on 31 July 1996. Misipeka contested qualifying group B. Her first attempt was 13.4 m and she improved this to 13.72 m on her second attempt. Her final attempt was her best at 13.74 m. She did not advance to the final and finished 25th overall.

| Athlete | Event | Qualification | | Final | |
| Athlete | Event | Distance | Position | Distance | Position |
|---|---|---|---|---|---|
| Lisa Misipeka | women's shot put | 13.74 | 25 | Did not advance | |
| Anthony Leiato | men's shot put | 13.02 | 34 | Did not advance | |

== Boxing ==
In total, one American Samoan athlete participated in the boxing events – Maselino Masoe in the light middleweight category.

The first round of the light middleweight category took place on 23 July 1996. Masoe lost to Mohamed Marmouri of Tunisia on a split decision.

| Athlete | Event | Round of 32 | Round of 16 | Quarterfinal | Semifinal | Final |
| Athlete | Event | Opposition Result | Opposition Result | Opposition Result | Opposition Result | Opposition Result |
|---|---|---|---|---|---|---|
| Maselino Masoe | Light-middleweight | Mohamed Marmouri (TUN); L 8-11 | Did not advance | | | |

== Sailing ==
In total, two American Samoan athletes participated in the sailing events – Robert Lowrance and Fua Logo Tavui in the star.

The 10 races in the star competition took place from 22–29 July 1996. Lowrance and Tavui achieved their best result in race eight finishing 12th. Overall, they finished with a net 177 points and placed 24th.

| Athlete | Event | Race | | | | | | | | | | Net points | Final rank |
| Athlete | Event | 1 | 2 | 3 | 4 | 5 | 6 | 7 | 8 | 9 | 10 | Net points | Final rank |
|---|---|---|---|---|---|---|---|---|---|---|---|---|---|
| Robert Lowrance; Fua Logo Tavui | Star | 23 | 23 | ~~DNF~~ | 24 | ~~25~~ | 25 | 23 | 12 | 25 | 22 | 177.0 | 24 |

== Weightlifting ==
In total, one American Samoan athlete participated in the weightlifting events – Eric Brown in the –91 kg category.

The −91 kg took place on 27 July 1996. Brown lifted 150 kg (snatch) and 180 kg (clean and jerk) for a combined score of 330 kg which placed him 22nd in the overall rankings.

| Athletes | Events | Snatch | | Clean & jerk | | Total | Rank |
| Athletes | Events | Result | Rank | Result | Rank | Total | Rank |
|---|---|---|---|---|---|---|---|
| Eric Brown | –91 kg | 150 | 22 | 180 | 21 | 330 | 22 |

== Wrestling ==
In total, one American Samoan athlete participated in the wrestling events – Louis Purcell in the freestyle −90 kg.

The first round of the freestyle −90 kg took place on 1 August 1996. Purcell lost his match to Ričardas Pauliukonis of Lithuania by grand superiority. In the second classification round, Purcell was eliminated from the tournament after losing by fall to Kaloyan Baev of Bulgaria.

| Athlete | Event | Round 1 | Classification Round 2 | Quarterfinal | Semifinal | Final / BM | |
| Athlete | Event | Opposition Result | Opposition Result | Opposition Result | Opposition Result | Opposition Result | Rank |
|---|---|---|---|---|---|---|---|
| Louis Purcell | −90 kg | Pauliukonis (LTU); L 0-11 | Baev (BUL); L 0-4 Fall | Did not advance | | | 20 |
