= American Samoa at the 1992 Summer Olympics =

- IOC code: ASA
- NOC: American Samoa National Olympic Committee

in Barcelona
- Competitors: 3 in 2 sports
- Medals: Gold 0 Silver 0 Bronze 0 Total 0

Summer Olympics appearances (overview)
- 1988; 1992; 1996; 2000; 2004; 2008; 2012; 2016; 2020; 2024; 2028

American Samoa competed at the 1992 Summer Olympics in Barcelona, Spain.

== Competitors ==
The following is the list of number of competitors in the Games.

Sport	Men	Women	Total
Boxing	2	–	2
Weightlifting	1	–	1
Total	3	0	3

== Boxing ==
Men

Athlete	Event	Round of 32	Round of 16	Quarterfinal	Semifinal	Final	
Athlete	Event	Opposition Result	Opposition Result	Opposition Result	Opposition Result	Opposition Result	Rank
Maselino Masoe	Light middleweight	Nagashima (JPN); W (RSCI-3)	Hashim (IRQ); W (RSCH-1)	Mizsei (HUN); L 17-3	Did not advance		5
Mika Masoe	Light heavyweight	BYE	Wilson (GBR); L 12-8	Did not advance			

== Weightlifting ==
Men

Athletes	Events	Snatch		Clean & Jerk		Total	Rank
Athletes	Events	Result	Rank	Result	Rank	Total	Rank
Eric Brown	90 kg	125	21	157.5	=20	282.5	21
