= List of American Samoan records in athletics =

The following are the national records in athletics in American Samoa by American Samoa's national athletics federation: American Samoa Track & Field Association (ASTFA).

== Outdoor ==
Key to tables: Awaiting ratification Record not kept by ASTFA Not ratified or later rescinded by ASTFA

=== Men ===
Event	Record	Athlete	Date	Meet	Place	Ref.
100 m	10.81 (−1.7 m/s)	Kelsey Nakanelua	28 April 2001		Honolulu, United States	
100 m	10.3 h	Kelsey Nakanelua	27 May 2000		Honolulu, United States	
100 m	10.59 (Note: unconfirmed)	Kelsey Nakanelua	1995		Honolulu, United States	
200 m	22.43 (+0.2 m/s)	Faresa Kapisi	March 16, 2014	Australian Junior Championships	Sydney, Australia	
200 m	22.4 h	Kelsey Nakanelua	June 21, 1997		Punahou, United States	
200 m	22.4 h	Kelsey Nakanelua	March 19, 2000		Honolulu, United States	
400 m	49.45	Kelsey Nakanelua	August 25, 2000	Oceania Championships	Adelaide, Australia	
400 m	48.4 h	Kelsey Nakanelua	June 10, 2000		Honolulu, United States	
800 m	2:01.3 h	Afutolu Lefiaseu	April 10, 1992		Utulei, American Samoa	
1500 m	4:19.65 (Note: by ASAA source; 4:19.7 h by World Athletics source)	Jezmond Papu	April 23, 2011	American Samoan Championships	Pago Pago, American Samoa	
3000 m	10:52.6 h	Afutolu Lefiaseu	April 10, 1992		Utulei, American Samoa	
5000 m	16:32.4 h	John Wasco	April 10, 1992		Utulei, American Samoa	
10,000 m	34:28.0 h	Sailala Solilai	September 9, 1971	South Pacific Games	Pirae, French Polynesia	
Half marathon	1:43:17	Franklin Paaga	December 10, 1997		Apia, Samoa	
Marathon	2:25:35	Gary Fanelli	October 2, 1988	Olympic Games	Seoul, South Korea	(Note: Fanelli, from the Philadelphia, Pennsylvania area, moved to Tafuna, American Samoa six months prior to the 1988 Summer Olympics in Seoul in order to coach and attain his Olympic eligibility for America Samoa.)
110 m hurdles	15.42 (+0.7 m/s)	Aaron Victorian	March 6, 2010	CSU Stanislaus Kim Duyst Invite	Turlock, United States	
400 m hurdles						
3000 m steeplechase	12:00.56	Franklin Paaga	August 16, 1997	South Pacific Mini Games	Tafuna, American Samoa	
High jump	1.89 m	Aaron Victorian	February 12, 2010	Coast Conference Preview	San Jose, California, United States	
Pole vault	5.41 m	Makisi Haleck	May 28, 2005		Norman, Oklahoma, United States	
Long jump	6.90 m	Sa Fuimaono	August 1990		Pago Pago, American Samoa	
Triple jump	13.75 m	Sa Fuimaono	July 1991		Pago Pago, American Samoa	
Shot put	15.09 m	Danny Pritchard	September 15, 1983	South Pacific Games	Apia, Samoa	
Discus throw	50.17 m	Frederick Morgan	August 1990		San Diego, United States	
Hammer throw	39.40 m	Taulagi Sualevai	December 9, 1987	South Pacific Games	Nouméa, New Caledonia	
Javelin throw	67.40 m	Frederick Morgan	September 1991		San Diego, United States	
Decathlon	6572 pts	Aaron Victorian	May 21–22, 2010	California State Championships	Lancaster, California, United States	
Decathlon	100m / Long jump / Shot put / High jump / 400m / 110m H / Discus / Pole vault / Javelin / 1500m; 11.09 / 6.98 m (+3.6 m/s) / 13.79 m / 1.83 m / 53.84 / 15.63 / 38.13 m / 3.94 m / 48.65 m / 5:43.43					
20 km walk (road)						
50 km walk (road)						
4 × 100 m relay	44.52	American Samoa; Taeoa Amisone; Ito Tinae; Perese Tolua; Eliu La'au	September 7, 1979	South Pacific Games	Suva, Fiji	
4 × 400 m relay	3:37.6 h	American Samoa; Jackson Leovao; Mauga Iofi; Pita Faavae; Sinapati Uiagalelei	August 18, 1997	South Pacific Mini Games	Tafuna, American Samoa	

=== Women ===
Event	Record	Athlete	Date	Meet	Place	Ref.
100 m	12.78 (±0.0 m/s)	Filomenaleonisa Iakopo	2 August 2024	Olympic Games	Paris, France	
200 m	26.66 (±0.0 m/s)	Filomenaleonisa Iakopo	29 November 2023	Pacific Games	Honiara, Solomon Islands	
400 m	1:07.14	Afega Fetaiai	September 11, 1983	South Pacific Games	Apia, Western Samoa	
400 m	1:05.8 h	Jane Phineas	August 14, 1969	South Pacific Games	Port Moresby, Papua and New Guinea	
800 m	2:39.11	Paula Stevenson	December 10, 1987	South Pacific Games	Nouméa, New Caledonia	
1500 m	5:33.80	Paula Stevenson	December 14, 1987	South Pacific Games	Nouméa, New Caledonia	
3000 m	12:15.9 h	Georgiana Tomisato	May 1983			
5000 m	21:07.8 h	Paula Stevenson	May 1, 1991		Pago Pago, American Samoa	
10,000 m	45:34.6 h	Rose Siaosi	April 11, 1992		Utulei, American Samoa	
Half marathon	1:47.39	Faye Ondelacy	October 21, 2001	Humboldt Redwoods Marathon	Weott, United States	
Marathon	3:57:15	Faye Ondelacy	June 19, 1999		Anchorage, United States	
100 m hurdles	15.83 (NWI)	Jordan Mageo	May 12, 2015	San Diego City Finals	San Diego, United States	
400 m hurdles	1:07.87	Jordan Mageo	April 2, 2016	California Collegiate Invitational	San Diego, United States	
3000 m steeplechase						
High jump	1.35 m	Jordan Mageo	February 20, 2016	Pomona-Pitzer Collegiate All Comers	Claremont, United States	
Pole vault						
Long jump	4.50 m	Lila Waetin	October 16, 2007		Tereora, Cook Islands	
Long jump	5.80 m	Jane Phineas	1968		United States	
Triple jump	8.72 m	Ira Ripine	April 9, 1992		Utulei, American Samoa	
Shot put	16.67 m	Lisa Misipeka	April 15, 1995		Columbia, United States	
Discus throw	55.99 m	Alexandra Morgan	June 2, 2017	Iron Wood Throws Classic	Coeur d'Alene, United States	
Discus throw	60.57 m	Alexandra Freeman (Note: citizenship unclear; US by World Athletics)	11 April 2026	Oklahoma Throws Series	Ramona, United States	
Hammer throw	69.24 m	Lisa Misipeka	June 8, 2003		Burnaby, Canada	
Javelin throw	36.87 m ^{†}	Claire Morgan	April 15, 2010	Bryan Clay Invitational	Azusa, United States	
Heptathlon						
Heptathlon	100m H / High jump / Shot put / 200m / Long jump / Javelin / 800m					
20 km walk (road)						
50 km walk (road)						
4 × 100 m relay	1:01.77	American Samoa; Tafailagi Niusulu; Puletasi; Savannah Sanitoa; Chanel	June 6, 2003		Apia, Samoa	
4 × 400 m relay	5:03.2 h	American Samoa	May 28, 1983		Pesega, Western Samoa	

^{‡}: Another source states : no height
^{†}: 36.47 m in Claremont, California, United States, by another source

== Indoor ==
=== Men ===
Event	Record	Athlete	Date	Meet	Place	Ref.
60 m	7.14	Faresa Kapisi	March 7, 2014	World Championships	Sopot, Poland	
200 m						
400 m						
800 m						
1500 m						
3000 m						
60 m hurdles						
High jump	1.85 m A	Makisi Haleck	February 16, 2002		Colorado Springs, United States	
Pole vault	5.27 m	Makisi Haleck	March 5, 2005		South Bend, United States	
Long jump	6.12 m	Isaac Silafau	19 September 2017	Asian Indoor and Martial Arts Games	Ashgabat, Turkmenistan	
Triple jump						
Shot put	14.95 m A	Trevor Misipeka	January 16, 1999		Pocatello, United States	
Heptathlon						
Heptathlon	60m / Long jump / Shot put / High jump / 60m H / Pole vault / 1000m					
5000 m walk						
4 × 400 m relay						

=== Women ===
Event	Record	Athlete	Date	Meet	Place	Ref.
60 m	8.44	Filomenaleonisa Iakopo	2 March 2024	World Championships	Glasgow, United Kingdom	
200 m						
400 m						
800 m						
1500 m						
3000 m						
60 m hurdles						
High jump						
Pole vault						
Long jump						
Triple jump						
Shot put	16.07 m (Note: 16.05 m by other sources)	Lisa Misipeka	February 21, 1997		Gainesville, United States	
Weight throw	22.40 m	Lisa Misipeka	February 5, 1999		New York City, United States	
Pentathlon						
Pentathlon	60m H / High jump / Shot put / Long jump / 800m					
3000 m walk						
4 × 400 m relay						
