= American Samoa at the 2008 Summer Olympics =

- IOC code: ASA
- NOC: American Samoa National Olympic Committee

in Beijing
- Competitors: 4 in 3 sports
- Flag bearer: Silulu A'etonu
- Medals: Gold 0 Silver 0 Bronze 0 Total 0

Summer Olympics appearances (overview)
- 1988; 1992; 1996; 2000; 2004; 2008; 2012; 2016; 2020; 2024; 2028

American Samoa sent a team to the 2008 Summer Olympics in Beijing, China. The U.S. territory selected four athletes to compete in three sports: swimming, athletics and judo. The dependency's participation in Beijing marked its seventh participation in any Olympic game since its debut at the 1988 Summer Olympics in Seoul, and its sixth participation at any Summer Olympic games. Of the four American Samoan athletes who participated in Beijing, all four were first-time Olympians and born outside American Samoa and none of the four advanced past the qualification or preliminary rounds of their events. More women participated in the 2008 American Samoan Olympic delegation than in any one delegation in its Olympic history. Judoka Silulu A'etonu was the territory's flagbearer at the ceremonies.

== Background ==
American Samoa is a territory of the United States that lies in the South Pacific Ocean to the far east of Australia. The dependency's debut at the Olympics was at the 1988 Summer Olympics in Seoul. Between 1988 and 2008, American Samoa sent a delegation to participate at seven Olympic games (six Summer Olympics and one Winter Olympics), not missing a single Summer Olympics since its first time in the competition. In 2008, American Samoa's delegation was composed of four athletes, including two women, which is the greatest number of women to have competed for American Samoa at any one games.

Silulu A'etonu, a first-time Olympian and a judoka, was American Samoa's flagbearer at the ceremonies.

== Athletics ==
Nineteen-year-old Los Angeles area-born athlete Shanahan Sanitoa participated on American Samoa's behalf at the Beijing Olympics. He was the only American Samoan Olympian involved in any track and field event. Also, his appearance in Beijing marked the first time he appeared in an Olympic games. He participated in the fifth heat during the August 14 qualification round, completing the event in 12.60 seconds and placing last in his heat of eight athletes. Danny D'Souza of the Seychelles ranked just ahead of Sanitoa (11.00 seconds). The leaders of Sanitoa's heat included the United States' Tyson Gay (10.22 seconds) and Nigeria's Olusoji Fasuba (10.29 seconds). Overall, the American Samoan runner ranked last out of the 80 athletes who participated in the qualification round. He did not progress to later rounds.

Men

Athlete	Event	Heat		Quarterfinal		Semifinal		Final	
Athlete	Event	Result	Rank	Result	Rank	Result	Rank	Result	Rank
Shanahan Sanitoa	100 m	12.60	8	Did not advance					

Key

- Note–Ranks given for track events are within the athlete's heat only
- Q = Qualified for the next round
- q = Qualified for the next round as a fastest loser or, in field events, by position without achieving the qualifying target
- NR = National record
- N/A = Round not applicable for the event
- Bye = Athlete not required to compete in round

== Judo ==
Guam-born then 24-year-old judoka Silulu A'etonu was the only American Samoan participating in a judo event at the Beijing Olympics. She had not previously participated in any Olympic games. The judoka represented American Samoa in the women's half-middleweight weight class (which includes competitors under 63 kilograms in weight). During the August 12 Round of 32 (the first round), Aetonu faced Germany's Anna von Harnier. von Harnier defeated A`etonu by a kuchiki taoshi, scoring ippon. She did not advance to later rounds.

Women

Athlete	Event	Round of 32	Round of 16	Quarterfinals	Semifinals	Repechage 1	Repechage 2	Repechage 3	Final / BM	
Athlete	Event	Opposition Result	Opposition Result	Opposition Result	Opposition Result	Opposition Result	Opposition Result	Opposition Result	Opposition Result	Rank
Silulu A'etonu	−63 kg	von Harnier (GER); L 0000–1000	Did not advance							

== Swimming ==
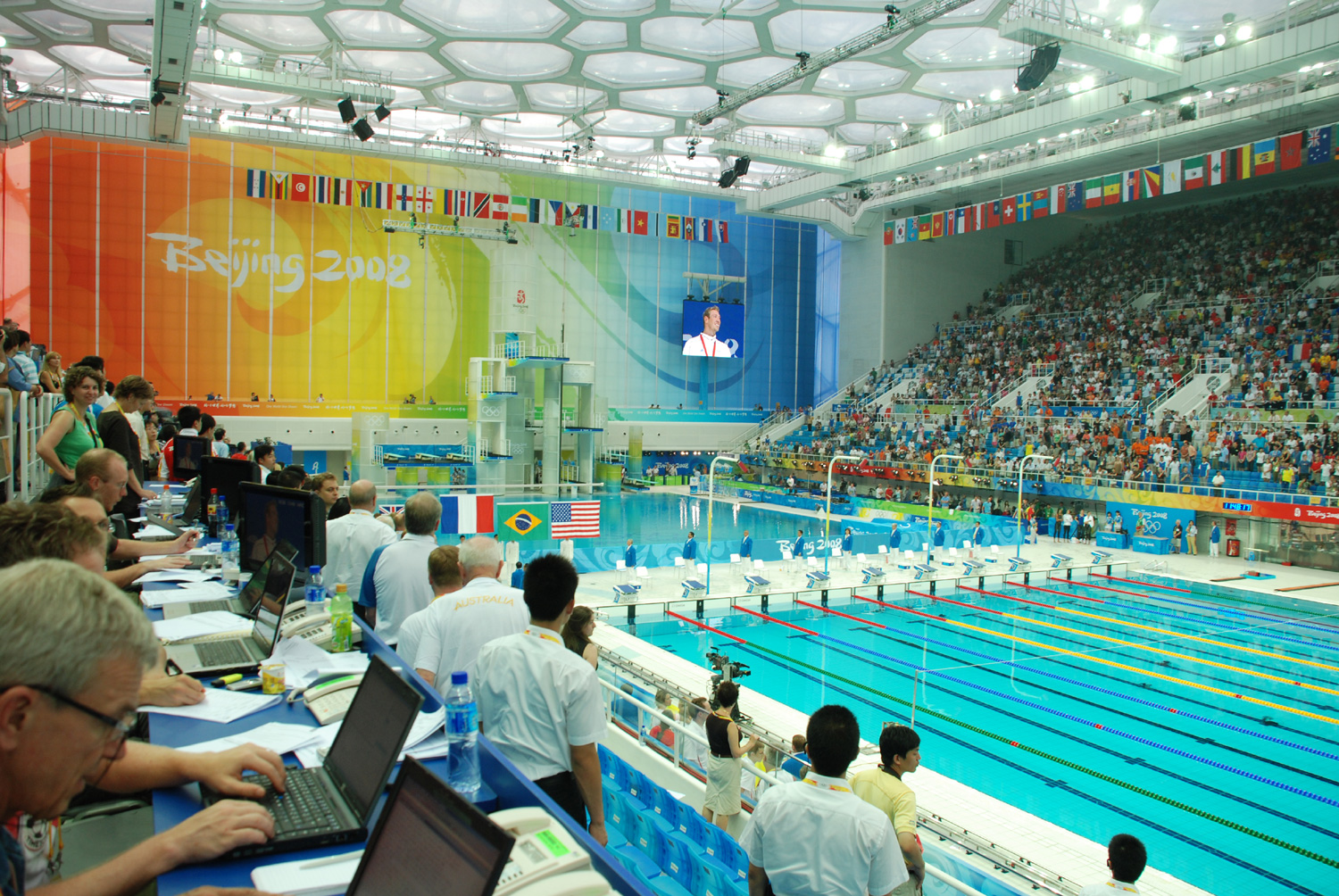
The Beijing National Aquatics Center, where Glenister and Farmer participated in their events

Then 19 year-old West Point student Stewart Glenister, who was born in Fort Knox, Kentucky, competed on American Samoa's behalf at the Beijing Olympics in the men's 50 meters freestyle. He was the only American Samoan in the event, and did not previously compete at any Olympic games. During the August 14 preliminary round, Glenister competed in the fourth heat, and finished the race in 25.45 seconds. He placed first in his heat of eight people, displacing Palestine's Hamza Abdo (25.60 seconds). Overall, he ranked 71 out of the 97 participating athletes, and did not advance.

Also, then 32 year-old San Luis Obispo-born swimmer Virginia Farmer represented American Samoa at the Beijing Olympics. Farmer was the only American Samoan in her event. Additionally, prior to Beijing, she had not participated in any Olympic games or event. The preliminary round for the event took place on August 15, and Virginia Farmer participated in the fourth heat. She finished the race in 28.82 seconds, ranking third behind Swaziland's Senele Dlamini (28.70 seconds) and ahead of Bolivia's Katerine Moreno (29.05 seconds). The leader of Virginia's heat was Mozambique's Ximene Gomes (28.15 seconds). Out of the 92 participating athletes, Farmer ranked 62nd. She also did not progress to later rounds.

Men

Athlete	Event	Heat		Semifinal		Final	
Athlete	Event	Time	Rank	Time	Rank	Time	Rank
Stewart Glenister	50 m freestyle	25.45	71	Did not advance			

Women

Athlete	Event	Heat		Semifinal		Final	
Athlete	Event	Time	Rank	Time	Rank	Time	Rank
Virginia Farmer	50 m freestyle	28.82	62	Did not advance			
