= American Samoa at the 2016 Summer Olympics =

- IOC code: ASA
- NOC: American Samoa National Olympic Committee

in Rio de Janeiro
- Competitors: 4 in 3 sports
- Flag bearer: Tanumafili Jungblut
- Medals: Gold 0 Silver 0 Bronze 0 Total 0

Summer Olympics appearances (overview)
- 1988; 1992; 1996; 2000; 2004; 2008; 2012; 2016; 2020; 2024; 2028

American Samoa competed at the 2016 Summer Olympics in Rio de Janeiro, Brazil, from 5 to 21 August 2016. This was the nation's eighth consecutive appearance at the Summer Olympics.

Four American Samoan athletes, three men and one woman, were selected for the Games, competing only in athletics, judo, and weightlifting; all of them made their Olympic debut in Rio de Janeiro through wild card entries and universality places, without having qualified. Among the nation's athletes were American-born sprinters Isaac Silafau and Jordan Mageo (the lone female of the team), lightweight judoka Benjamin Waterhouse (men's 73 kg), and weightlifter Tanumafili Jungblut, who led the delegation as American Samoa's flag bearer in the opening ceremony. American Samoa, however, has yet to win its first ever Olympic medal.

== Athletics ==
American Samoa has received universality slots from IAAF to send two athletes (one male and one female) to the Olympics.

Key

- Note–Ranks given for track events are within the athlete's heat only
- Q = Qualified for the next round
- q = Qualified for the next round as a fastest loser or, in field events, by position without achieving the qualifying target
- NR = National record
- N/A = Round not applicable for the event
- Bye = Athlete not required to compete in round

Track & road events

Athlete	Event	Heat		Quarterfinal		Semifinal		Final	
Athlete	Event	Time	Rank	Time	Rank	Time	Rank	Time	Rank
Isaac Silafau	Men's 100 m	11.51	5	Did not advance					
Jordan Mageo	Women's 100 m	13.72	6	Did not advance					

== Judo ==
American Samoa has qualified one judoka for the men's lightweight category (73 kg) at the Games. Benjamin Waterhouse earned a continental quota spot from the Oceania region as the nation's lone judoka outside of direct qualifying position in the IJF World Ranking List of May 30, 2016.

Athlete	Event	Round of 64	Round of 32	Round of 16	Quarterfinals	Semifinals	Repechage	Final / BM	
Athlete	Event	Opposition Result	Opposition Result	Opposition Result	Opposition Result	Opposition Result	Opposition Result	Opposition Result	Rank
Benjamin Waterhouse	Men's −73 kg	Bye	Repiyallage (SRI); L 000–101	Did not advance					

== Weightlifting ==
American Samoa has received an invitation from the Tripartite Commission to send Tanumafili Jungblut in the men's middle-heavyweight category (94 kg) to the Olympics, signifying the nation's Olympic return to the sport for the first time since 2004.

Athlete	Event	Snatch		Clean & jerk		Total	Rank
Athlete	Event	Result	Rank	Result	Rank	Total	Rank
Tanumafili Jungblut	Men's −94 kg	~~141~~	DNF	—	—	—	DNF
