= List of American Samoan records in Olympic weightlifting =

The following are the national records in Olympic weightlifting in American Samoa. Records are maintained in each weight class for the snatch lift, clean and jerk lift, and the total for both lifts by the Weightlifting Association of American Samoa.

== Current records ==
=== Men ===
Event	Record	Athlete	Date	Meet	Place	Ref
60 kg
Snatch						
Clean & Jerk						
Total						
65 kg
Snatch						
Clean & Jerk						
Total						
71 kg
Snatch						
Clean & Jerk						
Total						
79 kg
Snatch						
Clean & Jerk						
Total						
88 kg
Snatch						
Clean & Jerk						
Total						
94 kg
Snatch						
Clean & Jerk						
Total						
110 kg
Snatch						
Clean & Jerk						
Total						
+110 kg
Snatch	120 kg	Kennedy Nofoagatotoa	2 May 2026	Oceania Championships	Apia, Samoa	
Clean & Jerk	151 kg	Kennedy Nofoagatotoa	2 May 2026	Oceania Championships	Apia, Samoa	
Total	271 kg	Kennedy Nofoagatotoa	2 May 2026	Oceania Championships	Apia, Samoa	

== Historical records ==
=== Men (2018–2025) ===
Event	Record	Athlete	Date	Meet	Place	Ref
55 kg
Snatch						
Clean & Jerk						
Total						
61 kg
Snatch						
Clean & Jerk						
Total						
67 kg
Snatch						
Clean & Jerk						
Total						
73 kg
Snatch						
Clean & Jerk						
Total						
81 kg
Snatch						
Clean & Jerk						
Total						
89 kg
Snatch						
Clean & Jerk						
Total						
96 kg
Snatch						
Clean & Jerk						
Total						
102 kg
Snatch						
Clean & Jerk						
Total						
109 kg
Snatch	150 kg	Tanumafili Jungblut	3 August 2021	Olympic Games	Tokyo, Japan	
Clean & Jerk	194 kg	Tanumafili Jungblut	July 2019	Pacific Games	Apia, Samoa	
Total	336 kg	Tanumafili Jungblut	July 2019	Pacific Games	Apia, Samoa	
+109 kg
Snatch						
Clean & Jerk						
Total						

=== Women (2018–2025) ===
Event	Record	Athlete	Date	Meet	Place	Ref
45 kg
Snatch						
Clean and Jerk						
Total						
49 kg
Snatch						
Clean and Jerk						
Total						
55 kg
Snatch						
Clean and Jerk						
Total						
59 kg
Snatch						
Clean & Jerk						
Total						
64 kg
Snatch						
Clean and Jerk						
Total						
71 kg
Snatch						
Clean and Jerk						
Total						
76 kg
Snatch						
Clean and Jerk						
Total						
81 kg
Snatch						
Clean and Jerk						
Total						
87 kg
Snatch						
Clean and Jerk						
Total						
+87 kg
Snatch						
Clean and Jerk						
Total						

== Historical records ==
=== Men (1998–2018) ===
Event	Record	Athlete	Date	Meet	Place	Ref
–56 kg
Snatch						
Clean and jerk						
Total						
–62 kg
Snatch						
Clean & Jerk						
Total						
–69 kg
Snatch						
Clean & Jerk						
Total						
–77 kg
Snatch						
Clean and jerk						
Total						
–85 kg
Snatch	110 kg	Tanumafili Jungblut	September 2011	Pacific Games	Noumea, New Caledonia	
Clean and jerk	130 kg	Tanumafili Jungblut	2010	Oceania Junior Championships		
Total	238 kg	Tanumafili Jungblut	2010	Oceania Junior Championships		
–94 kg
Snatch	152 kg	Eric Brown	27 March 1998		Nauru	
Clean and jerk	175 kg	Tanumafili Jungblut	25 November 2015	World Championships	Houston, United States	
Total	318 kg	Tanumafili Jungblut	May 2016	Oceania Championships	Suva, Fiji	
–105 kg
Snatch	135 kg	Tanumafili Jungblut	7 December 2017	Pacific Mini Games	Port Vila, Vanuatu	
Clean and jerk	182 kg	Tanumafili Jungblut	7 December 2017	Pacific Mini Games	Port Vila, Vanuatu	
Total	317 kg	Tanumafili Jungblut	7 December 2017	Pacific Mini Games	Port Vila, Vanuatu	
+105 kg
Snatch	120 kg					
Clean and jerk	157 kg					
Total	277 kg					

=== Women (1998–2018) ===
Event	Record	Athlete	Date	Meet	Place	Ref
-48 kg
Snatch						
Clean and jerk						
Total						
-53 kg
Snatch						
Clean and jerk						
Total						
-58 kg
Snatch						
Clean and jerk						
Total						
-63 kg
Snatch						
Clean and jerk						
Total						
-69 kg
Snatch						
Clean and jerk						
Total						
-75 kg
Snatch	70 kg					
Clean and jerk	85 kg					
Total	155 kg					
+75 kg
Snatch	93 kg					
Clean and jerk	114 kg					
Total	207 kg					
