= American Samoa at the 2004 Summer Olympics =

- IOC code: ASA
- NOC: American Samoa National Olympic Committee

in Athens
- Competitors: 3 in 2 sports
- Flag bearer: Lisa Misipeka
- Medals: Gold 0 Silver 0 Bronze 0 Total 0

Summer Olympics appearances (overview)
- 1988; 1992; 1996; 2000; 2004; 2008; 2012; 2016; 2020; 2024; 2028

American Samoa competed at the 2004 Summer Olympics in Athens, Greece from 13 to 29 August 2004.

== Athletics ==
American Samoan athletes have so far achieved qualifying standards in the following athletics events (up to a maximum of 3 athletes in each event at the 'A' Standard, and 1 at the 'B' Standard).

Men
Track & road events

Athlete	Event	Heat		Quarterfinal		Semifinal		Final	
Athlete	Event	Result	Rank	Result	Rank	Result	Rank	Result	Rank
Kelsey Nakanelua	100 m	11.25	7	did not advance					

Women
Field events

Athlete	Event	Qualification		Final	
Athlete	Event	Distance	Position	Distance	Position
Lisa Misipeka	Hammer throw	NM	—	did not advance	

Key

- Note–Ranks given for track events are within the athlete's heat only
- Q = Qualified for the next round
- q = Qualified for the next round as a fastest loser or, in field events, by position without achieving the qualifying target
- NR = National record
- N/A = Round not applicable for the event
- Bye = Athlete not required to compete in round

== Weightlifting ==
Athlete	Event	Snatch		Clean & Jerk		Total	Rank
Athlete	Event	Result	Rank	Result	Rank	Total	Rank
Eleei Lalio	Men's −105 kg	125	15	170	=13	295	14
