= American Samoa at the 2000 Summer Olympics =

- IOC code: ASA
- NOC: American Samoa National Olympic Committee

in Sydney
- Competitors: 4
- Flag bearer: Lisa Misipeka
- Medals: Gold 0 Silver 0 Bronze 0 Total 0

Summer Olympics appearances (overview)
- 1988; 1992; 1996; 2000; 2004; 2008; 2012; 2016; 2020; 2024

American Samoa competed at the 2000 Summer Olympics in Sydney, Australia.

== Archery ==
Athlete	Event	Ranking round		Round of 64	Round of 32	Round of 16	Quarterfinals	Semifinals	Final / BM	
Athlete	Event	Score	Seed	Opposition Score	Opposition Score	Opposition Score	Opposition Score	Opposition Score	Opposition Score	Rank
Kuresa Tupua	Men's individual	419	64	Yong-Ho (KOR); L 98–172	Did not advance					

== Athletics ==
Men
Track events

Athlete	Events	Heat		Quarterfinal		Semifinal		Final	
Athlete	Events	Time	Position	Time	Position	Time	Position	Time	Position
Kelsey Nakanelua	100 m	10.98	8	Did not advance					

Women
Field events

Athlete	Event	Qualification		Final	
Athlete	Event	Distance	Position	Distance	Position
Lisa Misipeka	hammer	61.74	14	Did not advance	

== Weightlifting ==
Athletes	Events	Snatch		Clean & jerk		Total	Rank
Athletes	Events	Result	Rank	Result	Rank	Total	Rank
Alesana Sione	+ 105kg	160	20	197.5	20	3357.5	20

== Officials ==
- President: Mr. Ben Solaita
- Secretary General: Mr. Ken Tupua
- Chef de Mission: Mr. Eddie Imo
- Attache: Mrs. Simeafou Imo
- Chief Medical Officer: Mr. Chris Spalding, ATC
- Archery Coach: Mr. Dave Tupua
- Weightlifting Coach: Mr. Roy Brown
