= American Samoa at the 2012 Summer Olympics =

- IOC code: ASA
- NOC: American Samoa National Olympic Committee

in London
- Competitors: 5 in 4 sports
- Flag bearer: Ching Maou Wei
- Medals: Gold 0 Silver 0 Bronze 0 Total 0

Summer Olympics appearances (overview)
- 1988; 1992; 1996; 2000; 2004; 2008; 2012; 2016; 2020; 2024

American Samoa competed at the 2012 Summer Olympics in London, United Kingdom from July 27 to August 12, 2012. This nation marked its seventh appearance at the Olympics. Five athletes from American Samoa were selected to the Games; all of them were given under Universality slots and tripartite invitation, without being qualified. Freestyle swimmer Ching Maou Wei became the nation's first male flag bearer at the opening ceremony since 1996. Among the sports played by the athletes, American Samoa also marked its Olympic return in wrestling after 16 years. American Samoa, however, has yet to win its first ever Olympic medal.

== Athletics ==
Athletes from American Samoa have so far achieved qualifying standards in the following athletics events (up to a maximum of 3 athletes in each event at the 'A' Standard, and 1 at the 'B' Standard):

Key

- Note–Ranks given for track events are within the athlete's heat only
- Q = Qualified for the next round
- q = Qualified for the next round as a fastest loser or, in field events, by position without achieving the qualifying target
- NR = National record
- N/A = Round not applicable for the event
- Bye = Athlete not required to compete in round

Men

Athlete	Event	Heat		Quarterfinal		Semifinal		Final	
Athlete	Event	Result	Rank	Result	Rank	Result	Rank	Result	Rank
Elama Fa’atonu	100 m	11.48	7	did not advance					

== Judo ==
American Samoa has had 1 judoka invited.

Athlete	Event	Round of 32	Round of 16	Quarterfinals	Semifinals	Repechage	Final / BM	
Athlete	Event	Opposition Result	Opposition Result	Opposition Result	Opposition Result	Opposition Result	Opposition Result	Rank
Anthony Liu	Men's −100 kg	Borodavko (LAT); L 0000–0100	did not advance					

== Swimming ==
Swimmers have so far achieved qualifying standards in the following events (up to a maximum of 2 swimmers in each event at the Olympic Qualifying Time (OQT), and potentially 1 at the Olympic Selection Time (OST)):

Men

Athlete	Event	Heat		Semifinal		Final	
Athlete	Event	Time	Rank	Time	Rank	Time	Rank
Ching Maou Wei	50 m freestyle	27.30	51	did not advance			

Women

Athlete	Event	Heat		Semifinal		Final	
Athlete	Event	Time	Rank	Time	Rank	Time	Rank
Megan Fonteno	100 m freestyle	57.45	35	did not advance			

== Wrestling ==
American Samoa has qualified one quota place.

Key:

- VT - Victory by Fall.
- PP - Decision by Points – the loser with technical points.
- PO - Decision by Points – the loser without technical points.

Men's freestyle

Athlete	Event	Qualification	Round of 16	Quarterfinal	Semifinal	Repechage 1	Repechage 2	Final / BM	
Athlete	Event	Opposition Result	Opposition Result	Opposition Result	Opposition Result	Opposition Result	Opposition Result	Opposition Result	Rank
Nathaniel Tuamoheloa	−96 kg	Isokawa (JPN); L 0–5 ^{VB}	did not advance						18

== Officials ==
- President: Mr. Kenneth Tupua
- Secretary General: Mr. Etisone Imo, Jr.
- Chef de Mission: Mr. Kent Yamada
- Physiotherapist: Mr. Chris Spalding, ATC
- Athletics Coach: Mr. Valusia Talataina
- Judo Team Leader: Ms. Michaelle Vargas
- Swimming Team Leader: Ms. Erika Radewagen
- Swimming Coach: Mr. Robert Scanlan
- Wrestling Coach: Mr. Ethan Lake
