= Tromsø Midnight Sun Marathon =

Athletic competition in Tromsø, Norway

Coordinates: 69°38′44.1″N 19°0′51.8″E

- Date: June, around the Summer Solstice
- Location: Tromsø, Norway
- Event type: Road
- Distance: Marathon
- Established: 1990 (36 years ago)
- Course records: Men: 2:20:03 (2022) (Norway) Ebrahim Abdulaziz; Women: 2:36:11 (2025) (Norway) Marte Mæhlum Johansen
- Website: Midnight Sun Marathon
- Participants: 2,201 finishers (2026)

The Midnight Sun Marathon is the world’s northernmost marathon certified by the Association of International Marathons and Distance Races (AIMS). Held annually in June in the Norwegian city of Tromsø, the race starts and finishes in Tromsø’s city center with a scenic course that includes two crossings of the iconic Tromsø Bridge.

Due to the city's location about 350 kilometers north of the Arctic Circle, the event is known for offering runners the rare experience of racing under the natural phenomenon of the midnight sun.

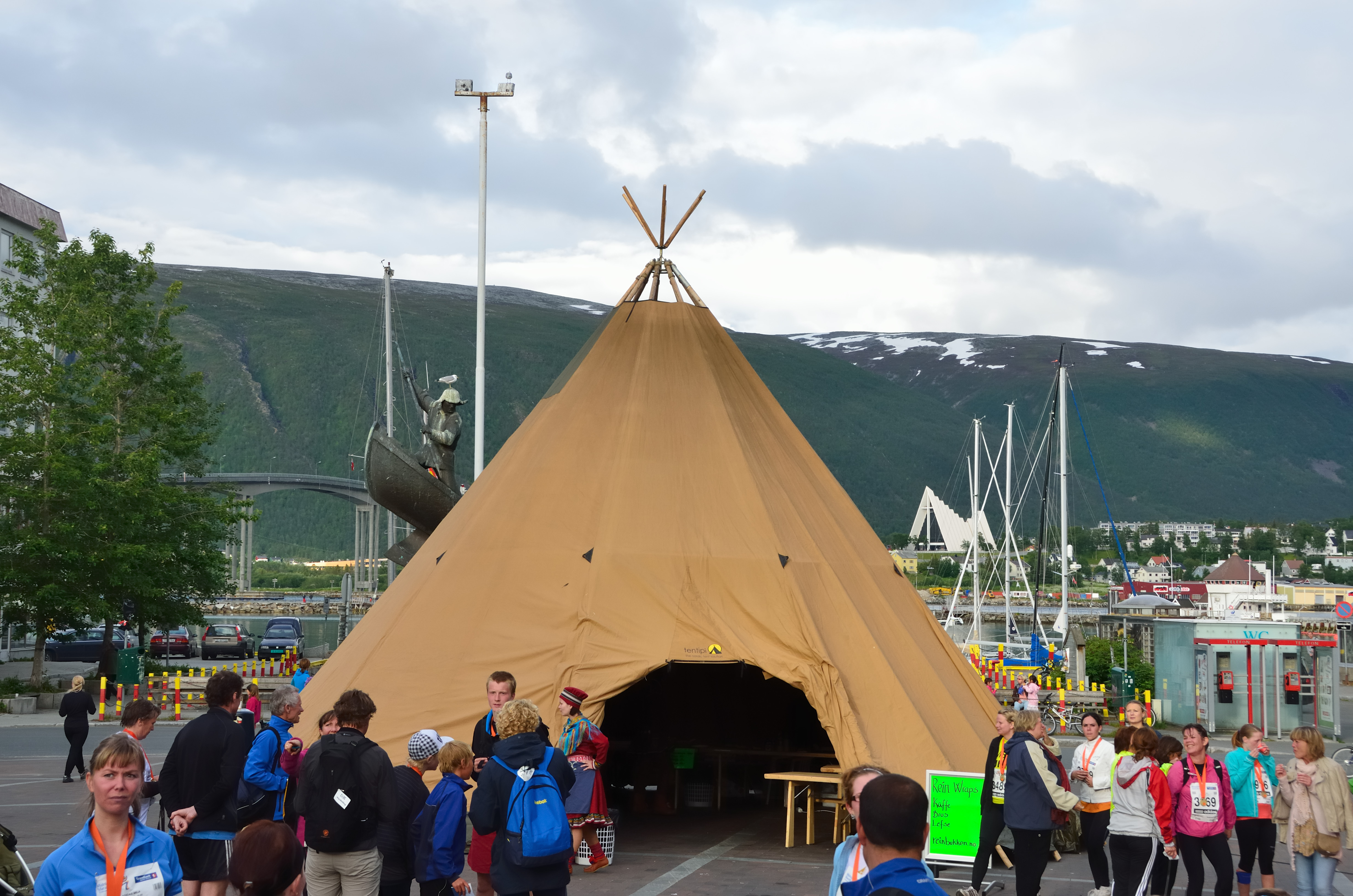
Temporary dwelling used by the Sami people of northern Scandinavia. It was used as a shelter during the midnight sun marathon.

== History ==
Organized by the Midnight Sun Marathon Foundation, the first event was held in 1990.

The 2020 edition of the race was cancelled due to the coronavirus pandemic.

=== Winners ===
Key: Course record

Edition	Year	Men's winner	Time (h:m:s)	Women's winner	Time (h:m:s)
36th	2026	Emmanuel Leblond (FRA)	2:37:47	Chiara Franzini (ITA)	3:10:02
35th	2025	Erik Lomås (NOR)	2:20:27	Marte Mæhlum Johansen (NOR)	2:36:11
34th	2024	Ebrahim Abdulaziz (NOR)	2:21:29	Hanna Lindholm (SWE)	2:43:42
33rd	2023	Ebrahim Abdulaziz (NOR)	2:20:24	Yngvild Kaspersen (NOR)	2:38:08
32nd	2022	Ebrahim Abdulaziz (NOR)	2:20:03	Yngvild Kaspersen (NOR)	2:45:13
31st	2021	Frew Zenebe (ETH)	2:24:36	Trude Thomassen (NOR)	3:03:07
	2020	cancelled due to coronavirus pandemic			
30th	2019	Ebrahim Abdulaziz (NOR)	2:20:32	Marthe Myhre (NOR)	2:50:50
29th	2018	Ebrahim Abdulaziz (NOR)	2:23:01	Marianne Dønnem (NOR)	3:09:32
28th	2017	Frew Zenebe (ETH)	2:26:31	Nina Kreisherr (GER)	3:00:33
27th	2016	Matthew Sigei (KEN)	2:31:54	Leah Kusar (KEN)	2:59:34
26th	2015	Anthony Mugo (KEN)	2:26:15	Claire Grima (GBR)	2:49:07
25th	2014	Martin Kjäll-Ohlsson (NOR)	2:28:54	Maria Venås (NOR)	2:46:48
24th	2013	Kristoffer Österlund (SWE)	2:25:20	Josephine Ambjörnsson (SWE)	2:53:33
23rd	2012	Tomas Bereket (ERI)	2:29:37	Marthe Myhre (NOR)	2:45:13
22nd	2011	Jens-Kristian Berg (NOR)	2:34:17	Mari Brox (NOR)	2:58:01
21st	2010	David Kanyari (KEN)	2:28:42	Mari Brox (NOR)	2:59:17
20th	2009	Samwel Kiprotich (KEN)	2:31:20	Anne Hodne (NOR)	2:47:15
19th	2008	Samwel Kiprotich (KEN)	2:23:14	Mona Rydland (NOR)	3:17:51
18th	2007	David Kanyari (KEN)	2:36:19	Elena Babenko (UKR)	3:15:30
17th	2006	Jens-Kristian Berg (NOR)	2:43:12	Cinta Groos (NED)	3:18:20
16th	2005	Runar Höiom (SWE)	2:36:11	Sharon Broadwell (NOR)	2:54:45
15th	2004	Knut Aalien (NOR)	2:27:48	Sharon Broadwell (NOR)	2:59:55
14th	2003	Egil Skarpsno (NOR)	2:30:25	Kristin Thorkellsdottir (NOR)	3:22:42
13th	2002	Salvatore Calderone (ITA)	2:24:24	Trude Kvanli (NOR)	3:27:25
12th	2001	Tor-Erik Nyquist (NOR)	2:25:11	Brynhild Synstnes (NOR)	2:38:22
11th	2000	Gjermund Hanssen (NOR)	2:33:25	Ingvill Holden (NOR)	3:27:20
10th	1999	Tor-Erik Nyquist (NOR)	2:26:48	Gitte Karlshøj (DEN)	2:46:03
9th	1998	Egil Skarpsno (NOR)	2:29:26	Gitte Karlshøj (DEN)	2:42:12
8th	1997	Abderrahim Goumri (MAR)	2:30:54	Monica Casiraghi (ITA)	3:04:25
7th	1996	Knut Hegvold (NOR)	2:20:56	Trine Jørgensen (NOR)	3:07:09
6th	1995	Ole-Petter Hjelle (NOR)	2:23:51	Trine Jørgensen (NOR)	3:13:33
5th	1994	Terje Hole (NOR)	2:23:49	Anita Bergdal (NOR)	2:54:55
4th	1993	Terje Hole (NOR)	2:23:21	Romy Lindner (GER)	2:47:25
3rd	1992	Jarmo Rundgren (FIN)	2:26:12	Sigrid Renna (NOR)	2:54:23
2nd	1991	Øyvind Trongmo (NOR)	2:29:33	Sigrid Renna (NOR)	2:53:13
1st	1990	Eimund Aamodt (NOR)	2:30:13	Sigrid Renna (NOR)	2:49:08

== See also ==
- Midnight Sun Run
