= Sanitoa =

Sanitoa is a surname. Notable people with the surname include:

- Larry Sanitoa, American Samoan politician
- Shanahan Sanitoa (born 1989), American Samoan track and field sprint athlete
