= Tilali Scanlan =

American Samoan swimmer (born 1999)

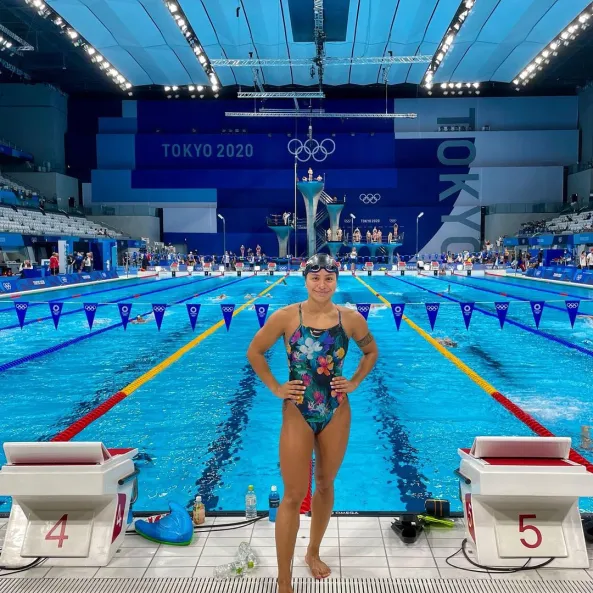
- Scanlan at the 2020 Summer Olympics

Personal information
- Full name: Tilali Rose Leslie Scanlan
- Nationality: American Samoan
- Born: November 3, 1999 (age 27) Vaitogi, American Samoa
- Scientific career
- Education: University of the South Pacific (BS); Western Washington University (MA)
- Fields: Ecology; environmental studies

Sport
- Sport: Swimming
- Strokes: Breaststroke

Tilali Rose Leslie Scanlan (born November 3, 1999) is an American Samoan swimmer. She competed in the women's 100 meter breaststroke at the 2020 Summer Olympics. Following her Olympic career, Scanlan became a marine and coastal environmental studies researcher.

Scanlan was born in Vaitogi, American Samoa, on November 3, 1999, the seventh of eight children. She was homeschooled for most of her education until college, and participated in various sports growing up, including swimming and judo. Scanlan was the youngest competitor at the 2011 Pacific Games, where she completed in swimming. She also represented American Samoa as a cadet (U18) at the 2014 Oceania Judo Union Championships. In swimming, Scanlan has competed in various World Aquatics events, including the 2016 World 25 m Swimming Championships, 2017 World Championships, 2018 World 25 m Swimming Championships, and 2019 World Championships. She represented American Samoa at the 2020 Summer Olympics in Tokyo, where she was the flag bearer for American Samoa at the opening ceremony and swam the women's 100 m breaststroke, placing 32nd. Following the Olympics, Scanlan began focusing more on her research pursuits, stating on Instagram that she would "take a momentary pause for a much needed physical and mental break" from swimming.

She had moved from American Samoa to Wellington, New Zealand, in 2016 to further her swimming career as there was no Olympic-size swimming pool anywhere in American Samoa. While in Wellington, Scanlan studied marine biology at Victoria University of Wellington. In 2017, she was named Pasifika Sportsperson of the Year and Victoria University Sportsperson of the Year at an award ceremony by the university. She completed her bachelor's degree in marine science with a focus on coral reef ecology at the University of the South Pacific in Fiji. When borders closed for a time due to the COVID-19 pandemic, Scanlan was stranded in Fiji with no way to return to American Samoa or elsewhere in the U.S. She later went to Hawaii, where she took courses online and trained for the Olympics.

After her graduation from university, from 2022 to 2024 Scanlan worked as a National Coral Reef Management Fellow – funded by a partnership between the National Oceanic and Atmospheric Administration and Nova Southeastern University – working with the American Samoa Coral Reef Advisory Group on coral restoration in the village of Aua and teaching coral identification across the territory. Scanlan joined the 2024 cohort of graduate students at Western Washington University's College of the Environment, where she received an M.A. degree in environmental studies with a policy specialization, advised by Rebekah Paci-Green. In 2025, she worked as a research assistant under Paci-Green, studying the coastal residents of Hilo, Hawaii's perception of building deterioration and seismic hazards. She has been noted by the International Olympic Committee and the Lewis Pugh Foundation as a notable sports figure serving as a sustainability leader.

Olympic Games
Preceded by Tanumafili Jungblut	Flag bearer for American Samoa; Tokyo 2020 (with Tanumafili Jungblut)	Succeeded by Nathan Crumpton
