= Adrian Hoesch =

German-American Samoan sailor (born 1993)

Personal information
- Full name: Adrian Wilhelm Jochen Hoesch
- Nationality: German-American
- Born: 9 February 1993 (age 33) Germany

Sport
- Sport: Sailing

Adrian Wilhelm Jochen Hoesch (born 9 February 1993) is a German-American competitive sailor. He competed in the 2020 Summer Olympics in the Men's Two Person Dinghy - 470 for American Samoa, placing 19th.

Hoesch is from Germany but has an American passport. He was educated at the University of Passau, completing a bachelor's degree in business administration, and at the Hult International Business School in Cambridge, Massachusetts, completing a masters in finance and international business. He has previously worked as a business analyst.

Hoesch previously won Bronze when representing Germany at the 2013 Junior European Championships. He represented the Bavarian Yacht Club at the 2018 New York Yacht Club Global Team Race Regatta. In 2020 he and Tyler Paige qualified for the 2020 Olympics for American Samoa at Sail Melbourne.
