= Robert Lowrance =

American Samoan sailor

- Born: 5 May 1954 (age 71)
- Occupation: Sailor

Robert Lowrance (born 5 May 1954) is a sailor who represented American Samoa.

Lowrance competed at the 1996 Summer Olympics, he was the skipper in the Star Class with Fua Logo Tavui as his crew, after 10 races the pair finished 24th out 25 starters.

== See also ==
- American Samoa at the 1996 Summer Olympics
