= Universality slot =

Diversity of participants in Olympic games

Universality slots or universality places are used by the International Olympic Committee to increase diversity of participating nations across the sports programme of the Olympic Games to help countries with traditionally small delegations.

== Examples ==
- Afghanistan at the 2024 Summer Olympics
- American Samoa at the 2012 Summer Olympics
- American Samoa at the 2020 Summer Olympics
- American Samoa at the 2024 Summer Olympics
- Andorra at the 2016 Summer Olympics
- Angola at the 2020 Summer Olympics
- Bangladesh at the 2020 Summer Olympics
- Belize at the 2024 Summer Olympics
- British Virgin Islands at the 2024 Summer Olympics
- Brunei at the 2020 Summer Olympics
- Cambodia at the 2020 Summer Olympics
- Cameroon at the 2020 Summer Olympics
- Cape Verde at the 2020 Summer Olympics
- Chad at the 2020 Summer Olympics
- Cook Islands at the 2020 Summer Olympics
- Democratic Republic of the Congo at the 2020 Summer Olympics
- Djibouti at the 2020 Summer Olympics
- El Salvador at the 2020 Summer Olympics
- El Salvador at the 2024 Summer Olympics
- Equatorial Guinea at the 2020 Summer Olympics
- Eswatini at the 2020 Summer Olympics
- Fiji at the 2020 Summer Olympics
- Guinea at the 2020 Summer Olympics
- Haiti at the 2020 Summer Olympics
- Honduras at the 2016 Summer Olympics
- Honduras at the 2020 Summer Olympics
- Hong Kong at the 2020 Summer Olympics
- Iceland at the 2020 Summer Olympics
- Iraq at the 2020 Summer Olympics
- Jordan at the 2020 Summer Olympics
- Kiribati at the 2020 Summer Olympics
- Kiribati at the 2024 Summer Paralympics
- Kiribati at the 2024 Summer Paralympics
- Kosovo at the 2020 Summer Olympics
- Laos at the 2020 Summer Olympics
- Laos at the 2024 Summer Olympics
- Lebanon at the 2020 Summer Olympics
- Libya at the 2020 Summer Olympics
- Liechtenstein at the 2024 Summer Olympics
- Madagascar at the 2020 Summer Olympics
- Madagascar at the 2024 Summer Olympics
- Malawi at the 2020 Summer Olympics
- Maldives at the 2020 Summer Olympics
- Malta at the 2020 Summer Olympics
- Marshall Islands at the 2020 Summer Olympics
- Mauritania at the 2016 Summer Olympics
- Mauritius at the 2020 Summer Olympics
- Monaco at the 2016 Summer Olympics
- Monaco at the 2020 Summer Olympics
- Mozambique at the 2020 Summer Olympics
- Nauru at the 2020 Summer Olympics
- Nepal at the 2020 Summer Olympics
- Nepal at the 2024 Summer Olympics
- Nicaragua at the 2020 Summer Olympics
- Nicaragua at the 2024 Summer Olympics
- North Macedonia at the 2020 Summer Olympics
- Palau at the 2024 Summer Olympics
- Palestine at the 2020 Summer Olympics
- Papua New Guinea at the 2020 Summer Olympics
- Saint Vincent and the Grenadines at the 2020 Summer Olympics
- San Marino at the 2016 Summer Olympics
- San Marino at the 2024 Summer Olympics
- Seychelles at the 2020 Summer Olympics
- Sierra Leone at the 2020 Summer Olympics
- Sierra Leone at the 2020 Summer Olympics
- Singapore at the 2020 Summer Olympics
- Solomon Islands at the 2020 Summer Olympics
- Somalia at the 2016 Summer Olympics
- Somalia at the 2020 Summer Olympics
- Sudan at the 2020 Summer Olympics
- São Tomé and Príncipe at the 2020 Summer Olympics
- Timor-Leste at the 2020 Summer Olympics
- Togo at the 2020 Summer Olympics
- Tonga at the 2020 Summer Olympics
- Turkmenistan at the 2020 Summer Olympics
- Tuvalu at the 2016 Summer Olympics
- Tuvalu at the 2020 Summer Olympics
- Vietnam at the 2020 Summer Olympics
- Virgin Islands at the 2020 Summer Olympics
- Yemen at the 2016 Summer Olympics
- Zimbabwe at the 2020 Summer Olympics

== See also ==
- Olympic quota allocation system
