= Puletasi =

Traditional item of clothing worn by Samoan, Tongan, and Fijian women

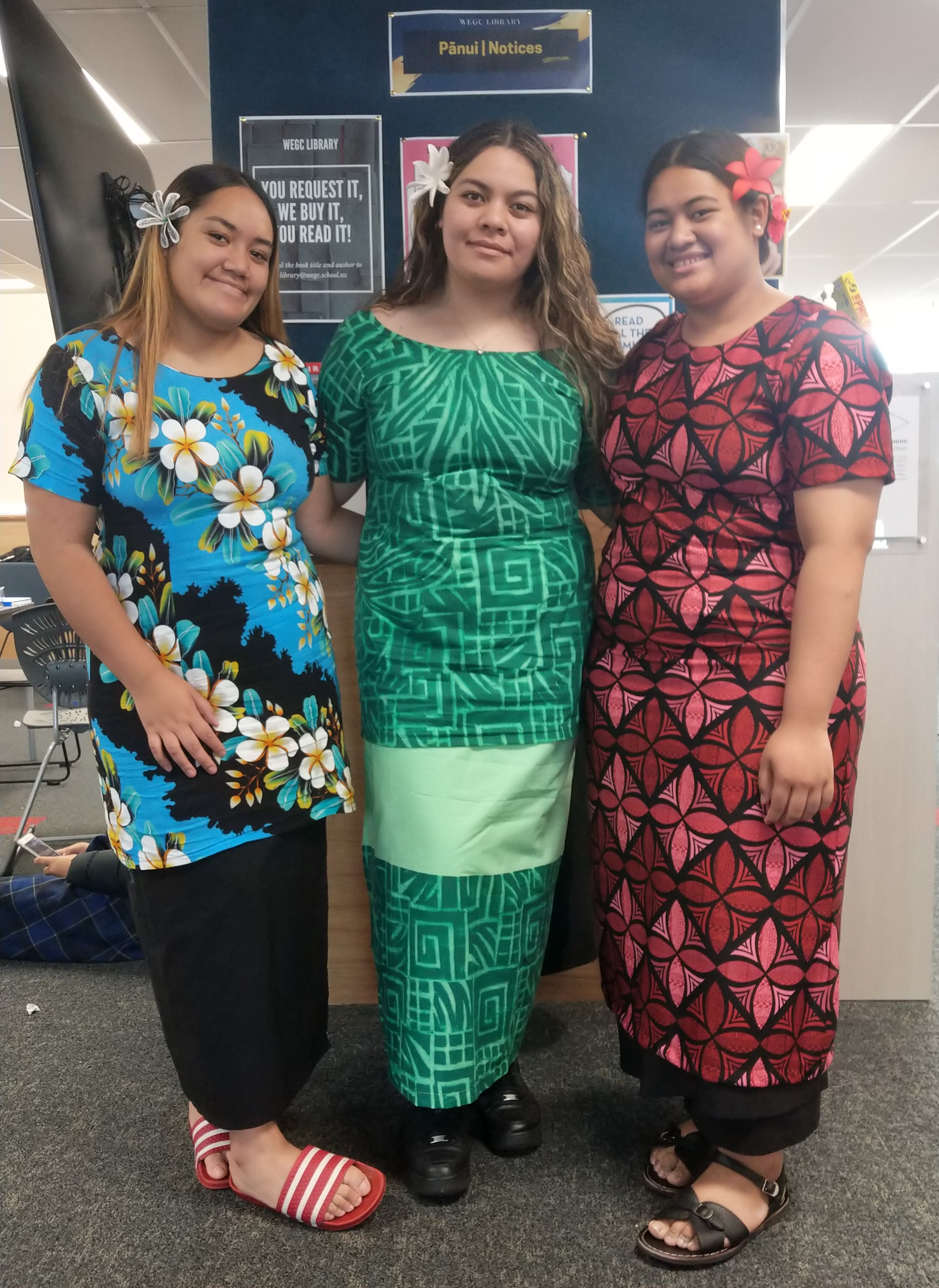
School students in New Zealand wearing puletasi.

The puletasi (Samoa) or puletaha (Tonga) is a traditional item of clothing worn by Samoan, Tongan, and Fijian women and girls. Today, puletasi is used as a female full dress. It is most commonly worn to church and formal cultural events. The puletasi is a two-piece outfit with a skirt and a top, either with both pieces in the same fabric or as a plain skirt and patterned top. The skirt is usually a wrap skirt or 'ie lavalava, with ties around the waist. For formal occasions or performance, decorations of tapa cloth, woven flax or other material may be layered around the waist over the skirt. In recent years, different styles and improvisations have been added.

Puletasi evolved from late 19th century 'missionary dress', a lavalava with a loose, yoked long-sleeved blouse or overdress.
