= Lopesi Faagu =

Weightlifter from American Samoa

Personal information
- Born: April 8, 1960 (age 66) Apia, Samoa
- Height: 1.67 m (5 ft 5 1/2 in)
- Weight: 80 kg (180 lb)

Sport
- Country: American Samoa
- Sport: Weightlifting

Lopesi Faagu (born 8 April 1960) is a weightlifter from American Samoa.

Faagu competed at the 1988 Summer Olympics in the light-heavyweight class, he finished 18th out of the 22 starters.
