= Anthony Leiato =

American Samoan athlete (born 1965)

Anthony Toi Leiato (born 26 August 1965, in Orange County, California) is an athlete who represented American Samoa.

Due to his ancestry Leiato competed in the 1996 Summer Olympics in Atlanta, he entered the shot put and he finished 34th out of 36 starters.
