= Gary Fanelli =

American Samoan runner (born 1950)

Gary M. Fanelli (born October 24, 1950) is a long-distance runner from the United States who represented American Samoa in the marathon at the 1988 Summer Olympics in Seoul, South Korea. Fanelli's 2:25:35 performance at the Olympics is an American Samoan national record. Known for running in costume, he has been called "the crown prince of road racing", "the king of costume", and "road-racing's longest-running joke".

== Early life ==
Fanelli was born and raised in the Philadelphia, Pennsylvania, area. He attended school in Ardsley, Pennsylvania, where "he was just another class cut-up". In 1969, Fanelli dropped out of Montgomery County Community College and reportedly joined a commune in Maui, Hawaii, but eventually returned to Ardsley where he began training. By 1980, he was a bee pollen salesman and a natural food advocate living in Oreland, Pennsylvania. He reportedly took 10 bee pollen tablets before races.

== Running career ==
Fanelli qualified for the marathon at the United States Olympic Trials in Buffalo, New York, held May 24, 1980. Wearing a shirt that read "The Road to Moscow Ends Here" in order to protest the American boycott of the Summer Olympics, he jumped out front at the start and by 11 miles had extended his lead over the pack to 150 yards. Fanelli crossed the half-way point in 1:04:39, but began to slow after yelling, "a blister on my left foot!" He maintained the lead for 15 miles before dropping back and finishing in 22nd place (2:16:49). Fanelli claimed that he set a fast pace so that the three American qualifiers, Tony Sandoval, Benji Durden, and Kyle Heffner who ran under 2:11:00 at that race, would all have better times than the eventual Olympic champion, Waldemar Cierpinski of East Germany who ran a 2:11:03 in Moscow.

Two-weeks later, Fanelli finished first ahead of Bill Rodgers and Rod Dixon at a Diet Pepsi-sponsored 10,000 meters road race in Philadelphia. In Montreal, Quebec, Canada on September 6, 1980, he set his marathon personal best of 2:14:17. (Note: Other references note Fanelli's personal best in the marathon as 2:14:16.) The following year, Fanelli led the 1981 Boston Marathon for 16 miles. He competed in the marathon at the 1984 Olympic trials, finishing in 23rd place with a time of 2:18:53. Fanelli finished sixth at the 1987 Boston Marathon, and had competed in 70 marathons by the autumn of 1988.

Fanelli moved to Tafuna, American Samoa six months prior to the 1988 Summer Olympics in Seoul in order to coach and attain his Olympic eligibility. Competing in the marathon, he finished in 51st place. He was also listed as the only member on the territory's 400 meter relay team.

Among Fanelli's victories are the 1981 Lewes Seashore marathon, a Sri Chinmoy marathon in 1982, the 1984 Last Train to Boston Marathon, the 1990 Maui Marathon, and the 1992 Run to the Sun 36.2 miler. In 1998 Gary Fanelli and USATF Olympic Development Official Stacey Chambers, Co-Founded the Puma USA Road Racing Track and Field Team.

== Costumes ==
Fanelli is known for participating in road races while dressed in costume. He began running in costume either in 1979 or 1981 after seeing a suit that reminded him of Elwood Blues, Dan Aykroyd's character from The Blues Brothers, in a Souderton, Pennsylvania thrift shop. Sports Illustrated reported that Fanelli's first race as Elwood Blues was a 10K event in Southampton, Pennsylvania, where he played a few bars of "I Can't Turn You Loose" as he crossed the finish line in first place. Runner's World later quoted him as stating that he first wore the costume at the New York City Marathon where "the reaction was outrageous". Fanelli regularly ran road races as the Blues Brothers character, including the 1984 Boston Marathon, the 1985 Pittsburgh Marathon, and the 1987 Charleston Distance Run, as well as events in New York City, Stockholm, and New Zealand. In 1987, Fanelli and Scott Williams entered the costumed division of the Midnight Sun Run as the Blues Brothers; the pair tied for second overall.

He has run the New York City Marathon as various characters: as Elwood Blues in 1983, as a Ghostbusters ghost in 1984, as a New York Mets player in 1986, and wearing a white tunic and toque as "Chef Ronzoni" in 1987.

In the 1984 Toronto Marathon, Fanelli ran a costumed best of 2:30:40 dressed as Michael Jackson with a red leather jacket, sequined glove, and curly black wig. He dressed as Abraham Lincoln in the 1987 Empire State Building Run-Up.

One of Fanelli's own characters is "Billy Chester Polyester", reported to be "one of the leisure suit crowd" and wearing "100% synthetic clothing". He competed dressed as the character in the 1985 Bay to Breakers. Dressed in a summer version of "Polyesther" that he described as "patio wear from Sears" (a straw hat, Hawaiian shirt, and large Bermuda shorts), Fanelli set a national record (Note: Although Sports Illustrated refers to the mark as a "national record", it is likely that they meant Fanelli's performance was the fastest on Jamaican soil (i.e. an "all-comers record"). There are no sources indicating that he ever was a Jamaican citizen.) at the second running of the Jamaica International Marathon on January 19, 1985. His 2:24:41 performance concluded with him running backwards and dancing reggae style over the final 100 yards prior to faking a hamstring injury with ten feet to go and crawling across the finish like a snake. Another account states that in the same costume he ran a 2:15 at a marathon in New Zealand.

Some of Fanelli's other original characters include "Clarence Nerdelbaum", a nerd with a calculator and a pocket protector full of pens and pencils; "Yogi High Karma, a wacko guru"; "Dr. Outrageous", a hip neurosurgeon; and "Gary Wallstreet", a businessman who raced around Manhattan's financial district wearing business attire and carrying an attache case. He has also appeared in races as a migrant farm worker, a pirate, and a teamster.

== Personal ==
Fanelli is a vegetarian and is reported to have founded the Philadelphia Vegetarian Society. He lived in Hawaii as of December 1988, and in Philadelphia as of January 2006.

His brother Michael was a head coach of the USA National Track and Field Team.
