= Fua Logo Tavui =

American Samoan sailor

Fua Logo Tavui (born 23 July 1952 in Santa Clara, California) is a sailor who represented American Samoa.

Tavui competed at the 1996 Summer Olympics, he was the crewman in the Star Class with Robert Lowrance as his skipper, after 10 races the pair finished 24th out 25 starters.
