= Tauama Timoti =

American Samoan weightlifter

Personal information
- Born: February 23, 1959 (age 67)
- Height: 1.75 m (5 ft 9 in)
- Weight: 108 kg (238 lb)

Sport
- Country: American Samoa
- Sport: Weightlifting

Tauama Timoti (born 23 February 1959) is a weightlifter from American Samoa.

Timoti competed at the 1988 Summer Olympics in the heavyweight class, he finished 16th out of the 20 starters.
