= Stewart Glenister =

America Samoan swimmer (born 1988)

Personal information
- Full name: Stewart Michael Glenister
- Born: October 12, 1988 (age 37)

Sport
- Sport: Swimming

Stewart Michael Glenister (born October 12, 1988) is a class of 2011 West Point cadet who competed in the 2008 Olympic Games in the 50 m freestyle swimming event, where he won his first heat event. Glenister's parents are both from American Samoa, so he represented that nation at the Olympics in Beijing.
