= Tyler Paige =

American Samoan sailor

Personal information
- Full name: Tyler Justus Paige
- Nationality: American Samoan
- Born: September 1, 1995 (age 30)

Sport

Sailing career
- Class: 470
- Club: Pago Pago Yacht Club

Tyler Justus Paige (born September 1, 1995) is an American competitive sailor that competes in the 470 class. Initially practicing sports such as baseball and cross-country running, he practiced sailing in the 420 class and represented the United States' team internationally. During his career for the United States' national team, he had competed at the 2018 Junior 470 World Championships and two editions of the 420 World Championships.

He switched his sporting nationality in 2020 to American Samoa as he believed he would have a better chance to qualify for the Summer Games in Oceanian tournaments. Alongside Adrian Hoesch, they competed at the men's 470 class at the 2020 Summer Olympics and placed 18th.

== Biography ==
Tyler Justus Paige was born on September 1, 1995, to Lisa and Rick Paige, with one sibling named Dylon. Tyler studied at Packer Collegiate Institute for his high school studies, where he was part of the institute's squash, baseball, and cross-country running team. He had also competed for the United States' national sailing team in 2014 and 2015, competing at the 420 World Championships in Travemünde in 2014 and Karatsu in 2015.

Upon graduating from high school, he was educated at Tufts University in Medford, Massachusetts. During his studies, he represented the United States at the 2018 Junior 470 World Championships in Bracciano, Italy. He had graduated with a bachelor's degree in mechanical engineering with a focus on aerodynamics. In 2019, he had asked the United States Sailing Association to switch his sporting nationality to an American Samoan one as he believed that he would have a better chance to qualify for the Summer Olympics through Oceanian qualification events. The request was accepted and he began representing the territory in 2020.

The same year, he was invited to be part of Dale Earnhardt Jr.'s NASCAR Xfinity Series team JR Motorsports as an engineer and accepted the request, though he delayed the start of his work to train for qualifying races for the 2020 Summer Olympics in Tokyo, Japan. Originally scheduled to take place from July 24 to August 9, 2020, the Games were postponed to July 23 to August 8, 2021, because of the COVID-19 pandemic. He began work on the team from September to February 2021.

Alongside German-American sailor Adrian Hoesch, they competed at the 2020 Sail Melbourne International for a chance to qualify. They placed first in the event and was thus qualified for the 2020 Summer Games in the men's 470. Hoesch and Paige competed in their event from July 28 to August 4, 2021, at the Enoshima Yacht Harbor in Enoshima. At the Games, Paige was at the helm, while Hoesch was the crew. They were eliminated before the medal rounds, scoring 159 points and placing 18th overall. Paiged returned to work at JR Motorsports after the Games.
