= Hiroshi Nagashima =

Japanese boxer (born 1966)

Hiroshi Nagashima (長島 浩, Nagashima Hiroshi) (born March 15, 1966, in Kanagawa) is a retired boxer from Japan, who competed for his native country at the 1992 Summer Olympics in Barcelona.

Nagashima competed in the Men's Light-Middleweight (– 71 kg) division. He was defeated in the first round by Maselino Masoe of American Samoa after the referee stopped the contest due to injury.
