= Midnight Sun Run =

Annual road running event in Fairbanks, Alaska

Coordinates: 64°51′21″N 147°49′53″W

- Date: Saturday in late June
- Location: Fairbanks, Alaska, United States
- Event type: Road
- Distance: 10 kilometers (6.2 miles)
- Primary sponsor: Fairbanks Daily News-Miner
- Established: 1983
- Course records: M: 29:14 (1984 - Tom Ratcliffe); F: 33:57 (1987 - Kellie Cathey)
- Website: midnightsunrun.net

The Midnight Sun Run is an annual 10-kilometer (6.2 mi) road race held annually since 1983 in Fairbanks, Alaska. The race takes place on the third Saturday of June each year, starting at 10 p.m. with the boom of a cannon that can be heard throughout Fairbanks. Despite its late evening start, there is no need for streetlights or flashlights, as the summer solstice sun shines brightly from start to finish and beyond. Proceeds from the race benefit Fairbanks Resource Agency and local student athletes through scholarships. In recent years the race has attracted over 3,000 participants, due in part to its special feature of running under the light of the midnight sun.

== Course ==
The Midnight Sun Run, which has started at the University of Alaska Fairbanks Patty Center ever since the event's debut, winds through a number of Fairbanks neighborhoods and along the Chena River, and finishes at Pioneer Park. Despite the late hour, spectators line the streets to cheer the runners onward. Temperatures ranging into the high 70s and sometimes even into the 80s in the dead of night can be a bit warm, especially for entrants from northerly latitudes, so to avoid overheating many runners are hosed down by residents along the race course.

== Race history ==
Close to 350 runners participated in the inaugural Midnight Sun Run, which started at 9:05 a.m. the morning of June 25, 1983, rather than at midnight. The course was slightly different from what it is today, finishing in downtown Fairbanks at the corner of 11th and Turner. Kent Karns was the first runner to cross the finish line, with a time of 32:28. Tricia Livingston was the first woman finisher, with a time of 40:29. The founder and race director in the event's early years was Mike Styles.

The Midnight Sun Run became an actual midnight sun event in 1984, when the start time was moved to 10 pm. Elite runners Tom Ratcliffe and Ron Gilooly recorded the first and second fastest times in the race with times of 29:14 and 29:19, respectively, records which still stand today. In 1986, top Californian marathoner Nancy Ditz won the women's division, while elite American marathon stars Benji Durden and Pete Pfitzinger dominated the men's field that year.

In 1987, Scott Williams and Gary Fanelli, dressed impeccably as the Blues Brothers, firmly established themselves in the wacky lore of the Midnight Sun Run's costume division, finishing tied for second overall with a time of 32:50. In 1988, the Fairbanks Daily News-Miner Midnight Sun Run was born, as the newspaper became the event's title sponsor. With around 2,200 participants, the run had firmly established its current reputation as one of the premier running events in Alaska.

In conjunction with the race, The first Midnight Sun Run Runner's Expo was staged in 2000, and featured former Olympian and renowned running guru and author Jeff Galloway, who conducted a seminar before a standing room only crowd at the UAF Patty Center. He talked about his experiences as a runner in the 1972 Summer Olympics, and answered a variety of questions on nutrition, injuries, training methods, marathon running, and spoke at length about his widely successful and influential marathon training strategies.

In 2006, some fifty United States Army soldiers, members of the 4th Battalion, 11th Field Artillery with the 172 Stryker Brigade Combat Team from Fort Wainwright, would not let their deployment in the Iraq War prevent them from participating in the Midnight Sun Run. They held their own 10 kilometer event in northern Iraq where they are part of Operation Iraqi Freedom. In a press release, 1st Sgt. Antonio Boone said it was "Quite a bit different than the last couple times I have run it. There was no forest fire smoke, no costumes and no one cheering." The soldiers wore official Midnight Sun Run bibs bearing the number 411, and received T-shirts donated and shipped from Fairbanks by race organizers. "Keeps getting easier every time I run it", said Sgt. Chad McFall, who helped push and pull a 2,300-pound howitzer along the 10 K course in the 2004 and 2005 Midnight Sun Runs in Fairbanks, "[T]his year there was no howitzer. It made running the race a snap."

The race went virtual in 2020 and 2021 due to the COVID-19 pandemic.

== Winners ==
Winners
Year	Male athlete	Country	Time	Female athlete	Country	Time
2001	Joseph Lemay	United States	31:39	Susan Faulkner	United States	39:49
2002	Kevin Brinegar	United States	32:51	Susan Faulkner	United States	36:53
2003	Kevin Brinegar	United States	33:22	Mara Rabinowitz	United States	39:57
2004	Devin McDowell	United States	32:54	Sara Dillman	United States	39:50
2005	Mike Kramer	United States	33:04	Crystal Pitney	United States	37:39
2006	Mike Kramer	United States	32:48	Crystal Pitney	United States	39:28
2007	Tony Tomsich	United States	32:17	Crystal Pitney	United States	38:32
2008	Sam Bedell	United States	33:58	Crystal Pitney	United States	38:51
2009	Tony Tomsich	United States	32:40	Crystal Pitney	United States	37:41
2010	Bryant Wright	United States	32:55	Maggie Callahan	United States	38:41
2011	Jason Walker	United States	33:47	Theresia Schnurr	United States	39:25
2012	Steve Chu	United States	32:32	Jessica Yeaton	United States	40:01
2013	Dylan Anthony	United States	32:08	Katie Krehlik	United States	39:14
2014	Chris Eversman	United States	34:21	Katie Krehlik	United States	38:04
2015	Kyle Hanson	United States	33:37	Aislinn Ryan	United States	38:22
2016	Japheth Ng'ojoy	United States	33:26	Katie Krehlik	United States	38:23
2017	Max Donaldson	United States	33:27	Molly Callahan	United States	36:23
2018	Rick Lader	United States	32:02	Kendall Kramer	United States	38:11
2019	Riley Howard	United States	32:15	Molly Callahan	United States	35:39
2020	Cancelled due to COVID-19 pandemic					
2021	Cancelled due to COVID-19 pandemic					
2022	Daniel Abramowicz	United States	31:16	Melanie Nussbaumer	United States	38:08
2023	Daniel Abramowicz	United States	32:01	Rosie Fordham	United States	37:20
2024	Daniel Abramowicz	United States	31:54	Rosie Fordham	United States	36:21
2025	Daniel Abramowicz	United States	30:43	Kendall Kramer	United States	35:09
2026	Daniel Abramowicz	United States	30:51	Clare Kelly	United States	37:22

== Collateral contests ==
Beginning in 1984, costumes have been a central theme for the Midnight Sun Run, and awards are given to the best coifed entrants. The costumed division is perhaps one of the most anticipated aspects of the race. Mike Styles said the idea of the costumed division was to create a Fairbanks version of San Francisco's Bay to Breakers race.

=== Photos ===
- JNAdleman.net - 'Midnight Sun Run 2004'
- PTIAlaska.net - 'Midnight Sun Run 1997: photos by Julie Coghill'
