= Shanahan Sanitoa =

American Samoan sprinter

Shanahan Sakofalefatu Sanitoa (born July 26, 1989) is a track and field sprint athlete who competes internationally for American Samoa.

Sanitoa represented American Samoa at the 2008 Summer Olympics in Beijing. He competed at the 100 metres sprint and placed 8th in his heat without advancing to the second round. He ran the distance in a time of 12.60 seconds.
