= Isaac Silafau =

American Samoan sprinter (born 1990)

Personal information
- Born: October 5, 1990 (age 35)
- Height: 1.75 m (5 ft 9 in)
- Weight: 68 kg (150 lb)

Sport
- Country: American Samoa
- Sport: Athletics
- Event: 100 metres

Isaac Phillipjunio Silafau (born October 5, 1990) is an American Samoan sprinter. He competed at the 2016 Summer Olympics in the men's 100 metres race; his time of 11.51 seconds in the preliminary round did not qualify him for the first round.
