= Mika Masoe =

American Samoan boxer (born 1963)

Michaelo Francis "Mika" Masoe Fao (born 11 November 1963) is an American Samoan boxer.

Mika like his brother Maselino competed at the 1988 Summer Olympics, Mika entered the light-heavyweight division and after receiving a bye in the first round, he faced American Andrew Maynard and due to being dominated in the second round the referee stopped the contest in favour of Maynard who went on to win the gold medal. Four years later at the 1992 Summer Olympics he entered the same weight and again he received a bye in the first round, in the second round he fought Stephen Wilson from Great Britain, but he lost the decision 8–12 on points.
