= Filomenaleonisa Iakopo =

American Samoan sprinter (born 2006)

Filomenaleonisa Iakopo OLY
Personal information
- Born: February 10, 2006 (age 19) Saipan, Northern Mariana Islands
- Education: Kagman High School; Baylor University

Sport
- Country: American Samoa
- Sport: Athletics
- Event(s): 100 metres, 200 metres

Filomenaleonisa Iakopo OLY (born February 10, 2006) is an American Samoan sprinter. She is of Samoan and Chamorro descent from the Commonwealth of the Northern Mariana Islands (CNMI), making her the first athlete from the CNMI to participate in the Summer Olympics. She qualified for the 2024 Summer Olympics and was named American Samoa's flagbearer.

== Biography ==
Iakopo was born on February 10, 2006, in the Northern Mariana Islands. She is of Chamorro and American Samoan descent: her father, an Air Force veteran, is from American Samoa, while her mother is from Saipan. She began competing in athletics in seventh grade. After being coached by her father for a time, her father hired Olympian Peter Pulu to help train her. She also has competed in bodybuilding events, participating in the 2021 Dee Clayton Classic championship along with her father.

Iakopo attended Kagman High School in Saipan; she graduated in 2024 in the top 10 of her class. While in high school, she began competing in international competitions representing American Samoa, setting several national records, including in the 100 metres and 200 metres. She made her international debut at the 2022 Oceania Athletics Championships and competed in the 100m and 200m events; her father, then-aged 49, also competed in those events. She later competed at the 2022 Pacific Mini Games, the 2023 Oceania Cup, the 2023 Pacific Games, the 2024 World Athletics Indoor Championships and the 2024 Oceania Athletics Championships. At the 2024 World Championships, she competed in the 60 metres and set the national record.

After Iakopo graduated from Kagman High School, she decided to attend Baylor University, majoring in neuroscience, in 2024. In July 2024, she was selected to compete at the 2024 Summer Olympics in the 100 metres. She was named the American Samoan flagbearer at the competition. Iakopo set an American Samoan national record of 12.78 in the preliminary round of the 100m at the Olympics.
