= Silulu A'etonu =

American Samoan judoka (born 1984)

Personal information
- Nationality: American Samoa
- Born: 19 March 1984 (age 42) Guam
- Height: 1.70 m (5 ft 7 in)
- Weight: 59 kg (130 lb)

Sport
- Sport: Judo
- Event: 63 kg

Silulu A'etonu (born March 19, 1984, in Guam) is an American Samoan judoka, who played for the half-middleweight category. A'etonu represented American Samoa at the 2008 Summer Olympics in Beijing, where she competed for the women's half-middleweight class (63 kg). She lost the first preliminary match to Germany's Anna von Harnier, who successfully scored an ippon and a kuchiki taoshi (single leg takedown), at eight seconds. A'etonu was also the nation's flag bearer at the opening ceremony.

Olympic Games
Preceded by Lisa Misipeka	Flagbearer for American Samoa; Beijing 2008	Succeeded by Ching Maou Wei
