= Ching Maou Wei =

American Samoan professional swimmer (born 1985)

Personal information
- Born: November 14, 1985 (age 40) Faga'alu, American Samoa

Sport
- Sport: Swimming

Ching Maou Wei (born 14 November 1985) is an American Samoan professional swimmer. He qualified for the 2012 Summer Olympics in London, despite the absence of a professional swimming pool in American Samoa. Radio Australia called Maou Wei's qualification as one of the "most unlikely of success stories" of the 2012 Summer Olympics.

Maou Wei was chosen as American Samoa's flag bearer during the 2012 Summer Olympics Parade of Nations at the Opening Ceremony. He hails from the village of Faga'alu.

Olympic Games
Preceded by Silulu A'etonu	Flagbearer for American Samoa; London 2012	Succeeded by Tanumafili Jungblut
