= Jordan Mageo =

American Samoan sprinter

Personal information
- Born: January 6, 1997 (age 28)
- Height: 1.72 m (5 ft 7 1/2 in)
- Weight: 59 kg (130 lb)

Sport
- Country: American Samoa
- Sport: Athletics
- Event: 100 metres

Jordan Mageo (born January 6, 1997) is an American Samoan sprinter. She competed at the 2016 Summer Olympics in the women's 100 metres race; her time of 13.72 seconds in the preliminary round did not qualify her for the first round.
