= Micah Masei =

American Samoan swimmer

Personal information
- Nationality: American Samoa
- Born: 22 March 1999 (age 27) Coos Bay, Oregon, United States

Sport
- Sport: Swimming
- College team: University of Hawaiʻi at Mānoa

Micah Masei (born 22 March 1999) is an American Samoan swimmer. He competed in the 2020 Summer Olympics.

Masei was educated at West Salem High School, and later at the University of Hawaiʻi at Mānoa.

In 2019 he represented American Samoa at the FINA World Aquatics Championships in Gwangju, South Korea.
