= Eric Brown (weightlifter) =

American weightlifter

Eric Brown (born 27 April 1969) is a weightlifter from American Samoa.

Brown competed at the 1992 Summer Olympics in the middle-heavyweight class, he finished 21st out of the 23 starters, four years later at the 1996 Summer Olympics he again entered the middle-heavyweight class this time he finished 22nd out of 25. He also competed at the 1993 World Weightlifting Championships where he finished 13th.
