= Tanumafili Jungblut =

American Samoan weightlifter (born 1990)

Personal information
- Full name: Tanumafili Malietoa Jungblut
- Nationality: American Samoan
- Born: June 10, 1990 (age 36)
- Height: 1.88 m (6 ft 2 in)
- Weight: 94 kg (207 lb)

Sport
- Country: American Samoa
- Sport: Weightlifting
Medal record
Men's weightlifting
Representing American Samoa
Pacific Games
Silver medal – second place	2019 Apia	109 kg
Bronze medal – third place	2015 Port Moresby	94 kg
Oceania Championships
Silver medal – second place	2017 Gold Coast	105 kg
Silver medal – second place	2019 Apia	109 kg
Bronze medal – third place	2015 Port Moresby	94 kg
Arafura Games
Silver medal – second place	2019 Darwin	109 kg

Tanumafili Malietoa Jungblut (born June 10, 1990) is an American Samoan Olympic weightlifter. He qualified for the 2016 Summer Olympics and was the American Samoan flag bearer during the opening ceremony. He won the bronze medal in the snatch at the 2016 Oceania Weightlifting Championships.

He competed in the 2020 Summer Olympics.

== Results ==
Year	Event	Weight	Snatch (kg)	Clean & Jerk (kg)	Total (kg)	Rank
2009	Pacific Mini Games	85 kg	98	112	210	5
2010	Oceania Junior Championships	85 kg	108	130	238	3
2010	Oceania Championships	85 kg	108	130	238	5
2011	Pacific Games	85 kg	110	126	236	8
2012	Oceania Championships	94 kg	116	134	250	6
2015	Pacific Games	94 kg	132	155	287	3
2015	Oceania Championships	94 kg	132	155	287	3
2015	World Championships	94 kg	137	175	312	28
2016	Oceania Championships	94 kg	143	175	318	4

Olympic Games
Preceded by Ching Maou Wei	Flagbearer for American Samoa; Rio de Janeiro 2016, Tokyo 2020 (with Tilali Scanlan)	Succeeded by Incumbent
