= Kelsey Nakanelua =

American Samoan athlete (born 1966)

Personal information
- Born: December 22, 1966 (age 59) Kaneohe, Hawaii
- Height: 1.76 m (5 ft 9 1/2 in)
- Weight: 79 kg (174 lb)

Sport
- Country: American Samoa
- Sport: Athletics

Kelsey Nakanelua (born 22 December 1966, Hawaii) is an athlete who represented American Samoa.

Nakanelua competed twice at the Olympics, firstly he entered the 100 metres at the 2000 Summer Olympics, he ran a time of 10.93 seconds and finished 8th in his heat out of nine starters so didn't qualify for the next round, four years later at the 2004 Summer Olympics again he entered the 100 metres and this time finished 7th in his heat so didn't advance. He is the 6 time Hawaii's Fastest Human (95-98,01,06) and has a personal best of 10.26 and the official Hawaii State Record of 10.59. http://archives.starbulletin.com/2000/09/14/sports/story2.html

Kelsey Nakanelua is running for election to the Honolulu City Council to represent District 3 in Hawaii. Nakanelua is on the ballot in the primary on August 10, 2024
