= Nathan Crumpton =

Samoan American sportsman (born 1985)

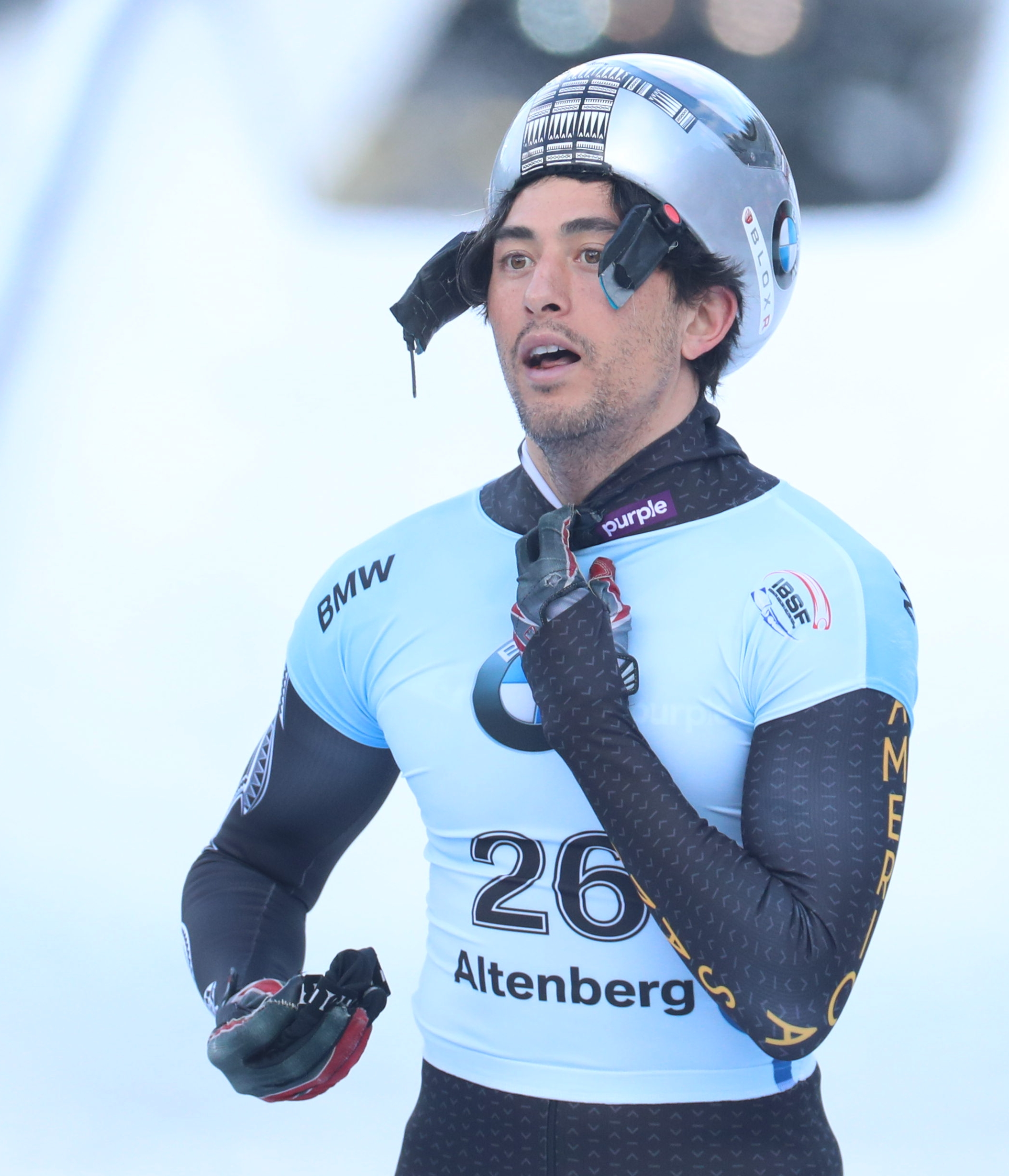
- Crumpton in 2020

Personal information
- Nationality: American
- Citizenship: United States
- Born: Nathan Ikon Crumpton; October 9, 1985 (age 40) Nairobi, Kenya
- Education: Princeton University
- Height: 6 ft (183 cm)
- Weight: 173 lb (78 kg)

Sport
- Country: American Samoa
- Sport: Athletics and Skeleton
- Event: Sprinting

Nathan Ikon Crumpton (born October 9, 1985) is an Olympic athlete who has competed in skeleton for the United States of America and American Samoa, and in athletics for American Samoa.

== Early and personal life ==
Crumpton was born in Kenya, where his father was stationed with the U.S. Foreign Service, and is a natural-born U.S. citizen. His mother is of Chinese and Hawaiian descent, and growing up, he spent most of his childhood in Africa before moving to Switzerland, Australia, and then to Virginia, where he graduated from high school. Now, most of his family lives in Hawaii. When he was younger, Crumpton was a track-and-field athlete first and foremost. He competed in the triple jump and long jump at Princeton, where he was a four-year NCAA Division I track and field athlete and an All-Ivy League selection in the triple jump, and as the third-farthest triple jumper in Princeton history.

He worked as a sports photographer for The Daily Princetonian and remains a keen photographer. In December 2021, he published a 553-page book titled "Alpha Status: A Non-fiction Novel". He graduated from Princeton University with an A.B. in sociology and a certificate in environmental studies in 2008 after completing a 132-page-long senior thesis, titled "Dissonant Realities: Behind the Veil of AIDS in Tanzania," under the supervision of Elizabeth Armstrong.

== Skeleton ==
In 2015, he raced in his first Skeleton World Cup event, and he finished the 2016–17 season in 11th place overall, a career-best. He had four top-10 and twelve top-15 World Cup finishes in his career, with a best World Cup race result of fifth place at Park City, Utah, in 2016. At the IBSF World Championships 2016, he led all American sliders and finished ranked eighth in the world. However, a herniated disc in his back prevented him from competing further at the World Cup and, ultimately, the 2018 Winter Olympics in Pyeongchang, South Korea. In 2019 he switched to American Samoa to represent his Polynesian heritage, and he won the first gold medal in a winter Olympic sport for American Samoa at the North America's Cup in Park City.

== Olympic career ==
After leaving the US team in 2019, Crumpton went looking for a new nation to represent and was eventually adopted by American Samoa.

He competed for American Samoa in the delayed 2020 Summer Olympics in the 100m race. He ran a time of 11.27 seconds, which was the second fastest ever time by an American Samoan athlete at the Summer Olympic Games. He was selected as the closing ceremony flag bearer for American Samoa. He also holds the American Samoan national records in both the long jump and triple jump.

Crumpton qualified to compete for American Samoa at the 2022 Winter Olympics in Skeleton. He again served as flagbearer, this time at the opening ceremony, becoming an "Olympic sensation" according to The New York Times by marching topless in traditional Samoan clothing in the freezing weather. After qualifying for the fourth and final heat, he posted a total time of 4:06.80 and placed 19th in the field.

He later competed at the 2023 World Athletics Championships, in Budapest in the 100 metres.
