= Maselino Masoe =

American Samoan boxer (born 1966)

- Born: Maselino Francis Masoe; June 6, 1966 (age 60); Apia, Western Samoa
- Nationality: American Samoan; New Zealander
- Height: 173 cm (5 ft 8 in)
- Weight: 75.5 kg (166 lb; 11 st 12 lb)
- Division: Middleweight
- Reach: 173 cm (68.1 in)
- Stance: Orthodox

Professional boxing record
- Total: 36
- Wins: 30
- By knockout: 28
- Losses: 6
- By knockout: 4
- Draws: 0

Other information
- Boxing record from BoxRec

Maselino Francis Masoe Fao (born June 6, 1966, in Apia, Western Samoa) is a retired Samoan boxer who represented American Samoa at three Olympics starting with the 1988 Summer Olympics. As a professional, Masoe made history becoming the first Samoan boxer to win a major world title, defeating Kenyan born Evans Ashira on May 1, 2004, for the regular WBA world middleweight crown via second round Technical Knockout. He is the brother of rugby player Chris Masoe. Another brother, Mika, also represented American Samoa in boxing at the 1988 and 1992 Olympics.

== Amateur highlights ==
Represented American Samoa as a Welterweight at the 1988 Summer Olympic Games at Seoul. His results were:

- Round of 64: Defeated Pedro Fria (Dominican Republic) referee stopped contest in first round
- Round of 32: Defeated Fidele Mohinga (Central African Republic) referee stopped contest in second round
- Round of 16: Lost to Kenneth Gould (United States) by decision, 0–5

Competed as a Light Middleweight for American Samoa in the 1992 Summer Olympic Games at Barcelona. Results were:

- Defeated Hiroshi Nagashima (Japan) RSCI-3 (00:54)
- Defeated Furas Hashim (Iraq) RSCH-1 (00:44)
- Lost to György Mizsei (Hungary) on points, 3–17

Competed as a Light Middleweight for American Samoa in the 1996 Summer Olympic Games at Atlanta. Results were:

- Lost to Mohamed Marmouri (Tunisia) on points, 8–11

Flag bearer for American Samoa in the 1988 and 1996 opening ceremonies.

== Pro career ==
Masoe moved to New Zealand where he began his pro career in 1997 and captured the Vacant WBA Middleweight Title by upsetting undefeated Evans Ashira in 2004. He lost the title to Felix Sturm in 2006.

== Professional titles won ==
- Oceanic Boxing Association middleweight title (1998) 159 Ibs
- IBF Pan Pacific middleweight title (1998) 158 Ibs
- WBA - PABA middleweight title (2001) 160 Ibs
- WBA regular World middleweight crown (2004) 159 Ibs
- New Zealand National Boxing Federation super middleweight title (2008) 167 Ibs
- WBO Asia Pacific super middleweight title (2008) 166 Ibs

== Professional boxing record ==
36 fights	30 wins	6 losses
By knockout	28	4
By decision	2	2

No.	Result	Record	Opponent	Type	Round, time	Date	Location	Notes
36	Win	30–6	(New Zealand) Kashif Mumtaz	TKO	4 (8), 2:48	19 Mar 2011	TelstraClear Pacific, Auckland, New Zealand	
35	Loss	29–6	(Hungary) Károly Balzsay	KO	11 (12), 2:07	25 Apr 2009	König Palast, Krefeld, Germany	For WBO super middleweight title
34	Win	29–5	(Australia) Sonni Michel Angelo	SD	12	8 Nov 2008	ASB Stadium, Auckland, New Zealand	Won vacant WBO Asia-Pacific super middleweight title
33	Win	28–5	(New Zealand) Paz Viejo	TKO	7 (12), 1:01	28 Jun 2008	Brewster Recreational Centre, Auckland, New Zealand	Won vacant NZNBF super middleweight title
32	Loss	27–5	(South Africa) William Gare	TKO	4 (12), 2:59	23 Feb 2008	Town Hall, Bloemfontein, South Africa	For vacant WBF super middleweight title
31	Win	27–4	(Thailand) Dechapon Suwunnalirt	KO	4 (8), 0:41	29 Jun 2007	Convention & Exhibition Centre, Brisbane, Australia	
30	Loss	26–4	(United States) Randy Griffin	UD	12	8 Jul 2006	(United States) Savvis Center, St. Louis, Missouri, US	
29	Loss	26–3	(Germany) Felix Sturm	UD	12	11 Mar 2006	Color Line Arena, Hamburg, Germany	Lost WBA (Regular) middleweight title
28	Win	26–2	(Kenya) Evans Ashira	TKO	2 (12), 0:44	1 May 2004	(United States) Jai Alai Fronton, Miami, Florida, US	Won vacant WBA (Regular) middleweight title
27	Win	25–2	(Indonesia) Henry Aritonang	KO	5 (12)	13 Sep 2003	Northland Town Hall, Dargaville, New Zealand	Retained PABA middleweight title
26	Win	24–2	(South Korea) Kwang-Jin Choi	KO	5 (12)	13 Apr 2003	The Sonic Bar, Auckland, New Zealand	Retained PABA middleweight title
25	Win	23–2	(New Zealand) Hemi Nika	KO	3 (8)	14 Dec 2002	YMCA Stadium, Auckland, New Zealand	
24	Win	22–2	(Fiji) Wahid Khan	KO	2 (12)	1 Sep 2002	Sheepy's Bar, Auckland, New Zealand	Retained PABA middleweight title
23	Win	21–2	(Fiji) Epeli Naua	KO	2 (12)	9 May 2002	Ocean City Restaurant, Auckland, New Zealand	Retained PABA middleweight title
22	Win	20–2	(Fiji) Setefano Vasuibau	KO	2 (12)	24 Feb 2002	Alexandra Park Raceway, Auckland, New Zealand	Retained PABA middleweight title
21	Win	19–2	(New Zealand) Peter Mokomoko	TKO	6 (12)	2 Dec 2001	Alexandra Park Raceway, Auckland, New Zealand	Won vacant PABA middleweight title
20	Loss	18–2	(Panama) Tito Mendoza	TKO	3 (12), 2:47	10 Dec 2000	(United States) Grand Victoria Casino, Elgin, Illinois, US	For vacant NABF middleweight title
19	Win	18–1	(United States) Sam Hill	TKO	2 (10)	21 Oct 2000	(United States) Silver Star Casino, Philadelphia, Mississippi, US	
18	Win	17–1	(Puerto Rico) Lionel Ortíz	KO	6 (10)	17 Sep 2000	(United States) Cobo Arena, Detroit, Michigan, US	
17	Win	16–1	(Mexico) David López	KO	3 (8), 2:45	21 Jul 2000	(United States) Regent Hotel & Casino, Las Vegas, Nevada, US	
16	Win	15–1	(United States) Tim Shocks	TKO	2 (8), 2:27	3 Jun 2000	(United States) MGM Grand, Las Vegas, Nevada, US	
15	Loss	14–1	(Panama) Santiago Samaniego	TKO	5 (10), 3:00	5 Mar 2000	(United States) New Frontier Hotel, Las Vegas, Nevada, US	
14	Win	14–0	(United States) Gerald Coleman	TKO	4 (10)	12 Dec 1999	(United States) Miccosukee Indian Gaming Resort, Miami, Florida, US	
13	Win	13–0	(Mexico) Martin Quiroz	TKO	1 (4)	20 Nov 1999	(United States) Miccosukee Indian Gaming Resort, Miami, Florida, US	
12	Win	12–0	(Fiji) Paula Tuilau	KO	1 (12)	28 May 1999	Omnisports Stadium, Nouméa, New Caledonia	Retained OBA middleweight title
11	Win	11–0	(Australia) Emmanuel Otti	KO	3 (12)	6 Mar 1999	Downtown Convention Centre, Auckland, New Zealand	Retained IBF Pan-Pacific super middleweight title
10	Win	10–0	(Australia) Abel Parker	PTS	12	7 Nov 1998	Downtown Convention Centre, Auckland, New Zealand	Won vacant IBF Pan-Pacific super middleweight title
9	Win	9–0	(Vanuatu) Phil Kating	KO	2 (10)	4 Sep 1998	National Basketball Stadium, Port Vila, Vanuatu	
8	Win	8–0	(Fiji) Kolianisi Vasu	TKO	4 (10)	18 Jul 1998	Downtown Convention Centre, Auckland, New Zealand	
7	Win	7–0	(Australia) Brad Mayo	TKO	8 (10)	21 Feb 1998	Downtown Convention Centre, Auckland, New Zealand	Won vacant OBA middleweight title
6	Win	6–0	(Australia) Ian McLeod	TKO	5 (10)	30 Nov 1997	Downtown Convention Centre, Auckland, New Zealand	
5	Win	5–0	(Australia) Jamie Wallace	TKO	4 (10)	19 Oct 1997	Downtown Convention Centre, Auckland, New Zealand	
4	Win	4–0	(New Zealand) Joseph Polu	KO	2 (8)	8 Aug 1997	Papatoetoe Reception Centre, Auckland, New Zealand	
3	Win	3–0	(New Zealand) Norm Graham	KO	3 (8)	25 May 1997	Downtown Convention Centre, Auckland, New Zealand	
2	Win	2–0	(New Zealand) Shane Bishop	TKO	2 (8)	11 May 1997	SkyCity, Auckland, New Zealand	
1	Win	1–0	(New Zealand) Falegana Fale Collins	KO	1 (6)	30 Mar 1997	ABA Stadium, Auckland, New Zealand	

== Awards and recognitions ==
- 2019 Gladrap Boxing Hall of fame

Sporting positions
Minor world boxing titles
Vacant Title last held by William Joppy	WBA (Regular) middleweight champion May 1, 2004 – March 11, 2006	Succeeded by Felix Sturm
Olympic Games
Preceded by None	Flagbearer for American Samoa; Seoul 1988; Atlanta 1996	Succeeded by Lisa Misipeka
