= Lisa Misipeka =

American Samoan hammer thrower

Personal information
- Full name: Lisa Vasa Misipeka
- Nationality: American Samoa
- Born: January 3, 1975 (age 51)
- Height: 1.68 m (5 ft 6 in)
- Weight: 110 kg (243 lb)

Sport
- Sport: Athletics
Medal record
Women's athletics
Representing American Samoa
World Championships
Bronze medal – third place	1999 Seville	Hammer throw
(South) Pacific Games
Gold medal – first place	1999 Santa Rita	Shot put
Gold medal – first place	1999 Santa Rita	Discus throw
Gold medal – first place	1999 Santa Rita	Hammer throw
(South) Pacific Mini Games
Gold medal – first place	1997 Pago Pago	Shot put
Gold medal – first place	1997 Pago Pago	Hammer throw
Silver medal – second place	1997 Pago Pago	Discus throw
- Updated on 28 April 2013

Lisa Vasa Misipeka (born January 3, 1975) is an American Samoan athlete who specialises in the hammer throw. She was the first woman to represent American Samoa at the Olympics.

She won the bronze medal at the 1999 World Championships in Athletics. First place was 75.20m, second place 72.56m, and 9m behind first and 6.5m behind second was Misipeka in third with 66.06m. It was the first ever international medal for American Samoa, and the greatest difference in distance between the first three medal places. The flag bearer for American Samoa at the 2004 Olympic Games in Athens, Greece where she did not record a distance in the qualifying round of the women's hammer due to a knee injury and therefore did not advance to the final.

== Achievements ==
Year	Competition	Venue	Position	Event	Notes
Representing American Samoa
1997	South Pacific Mini Games	Pago Pago, American Samoa	1st	Shot put	14.37 m
1997	South Pacific Mini Games	Pago Pago, American Samoa	2nd	Discus throw	43.32 m
1997	South Pacific Mini Games	Pago Pago, American Samoa	1st	Hammer throw	58.20 m
1999	South Pacific Games	Santa Rita, Guam	1st	Shot put	15.13 m GR
1999	South Pacific Games	Santa Rita, Guam	1st	Discus throw	46.00 m
1999	South Pacific Games	Santa Rita, Guam	1st	Hammer throw	63.39 m GR
1999	World Championships	Seville, Spain	3rd	Hammer throw	66.06 m
2000	Olympic Games	Sydney, Australia	14th	Hammer throw	61.74 m
2001	World Championships	Edmonton, Canada	20th	Hammer throw	63.34 m
2003	World Championships	Paris, France	21st	Hammer throw	64.42 m
2004	Olympic Games	Athens, Greece	—	Hammer throw	NM

Olympic Games
Preceded by Maselino Masoe	Flagbearer for American Samoa; Sydney 2000; Athens 2004	Succeeded by Silulu A'etonu
