= American Samoa National Olympic Committee =

National Olympic Committee

- Country: American Samoa
- Code: ASA
- Recognized: 1987
- Continental Association: ONOC
- Headquarters: Tafuna
- President: Ed Imo
- Secretary General: Ethan Lake
- Website: http://asnoc.org/

The American Samoa National Olympic Committee (IOC code: ASA) is the National Olympic Committee representing American Samoa. The committee was recognized by the International Olympic Committee in 1987. The headquarters are located in Veterans Memorial Stadium in Pago Pago.

== History ==
The committee was formed on May 30, 1985 and recognized by International Olympic Committee on May 12, 1987. American Samoa first participated in the 1988 Summer Olympics in Seoul, South Korea. with 6 male athletes competing in Athletics, Boxing, Weighligting, and Wrestling. Since then, American Samoa has competed in every Summer Olympics and two Winter Olympics: 1994 in Lillehammer, Norway and 2022 in Beijing, China.

In 2015, the ASNOC proposed an amendment to its charter allowing for the general secretary role to become a paid position. It followed 2014 allegations of unauthorized payments after which then-president Langkilde was called to resign.

In 2019, there was internal conflict when ASNOC "kicked out [the Sailing Association of American Samoa] two months before the Pacific Games," according to an article by Samoa News.

== Leadership ==
Etisone "Ed" Imo was elected president of the committee in 2017, and has since won re-election in 2019 and 2021. Ethan Lake was elected Secretary General in 2017 and again in 2021.

Previous presidents included Lealaifuaneva Peter Reid (1991-1992), Joseph Toloa'i Ho Ching (1993-1997), Ben Solaita (1997-2011), and Joseph Victor Langkilde (2013-2017).

== Federations ==
A number of federations were formed after the establishment of the committee, including the following sports: basketball, baseball, association football, rugby union, volleyball, wrestling, handball, sailing, netball, powerlifting, bodybuilding, pickleball, golf, swimming, boxing, paddling, triathlon, and table tennis.

== See also ==
- American Samoa at the Olympics
