= Virgin Islands at the 1998 Winter Olympics =

- Flag of the United States Virgin Islands
- IOC code: ISV
- NOC: Virgin Islands Olympic Committee
- Website: www.virginislandsolympics.com

in Nagano
- Competitors: 7 (6 men, 1 woman) in 2 sports
- Flag bearer: Paul Zar (bobsleigh)
- Medals: Gold 0 Silver 0 Bronze 0 Total 0

Winter Olympics appearances (overview)
- 1988; 1992; 1994; 1998; 2002; 2006; 2010; 2014; 2018; 2022; 2026

The United States Virgin Islands competed at the 1998 Winter Olympics in Nagano, Japan.

== Competitors ==
The following is the list of number of competitors in the Games.

Sport	Men	Women	Total
Bobsleigh	6	–	6
Luge	0	1	1
Total	6	1	7

== Bobsleigh ==
Sled	Athletes	Event	Run 1		Run 2		Run 3		Run 4		Total	
Sled	Athletes	Event	Time	Rank	Time	Rank	Time	Rank	Time	Rank	Time	Rank
ISV-1	Zachary Zoller; Jeff Kromenhoek	Two-man	56.77	33	56.90	34	56.71	33	56.82	34	3:47.20	33
ISV-2	Keith Sudziarski; Todd Schultz	Two-man	57.06	36	57.10	35	56.96	36	57.19	36	3:48.31	36

Sled	Athletes	Event	Run 1		Run 2		Run 3		Total	
Sled	Athletes	Event	Time	Rank	Time	Rank	Time	Rank	Time	Rank
ISV-1	Keith Sudziarski; Christian Brown; Paul Zar; Jeff Kromenhoek	Four-man	55.80	30	55.52	28	55.84	28	2:47.16	29

== Luge ==
Women

Athlete	Run 1		Run 2		Run 3		Run 4		Total	
Athlete	Time	Rank	Time	Rank	Time	Rank	Time	Rank	Time	Rank
Anne Abernathy	53.224	25	52.652	23	52.525	26	52.306	24	3:30.707	24
