= Virgin Islands at the 2002 Winter Olympics =

- Flag of the United States Virgin Islands
- IOC code: ISV
- NOC: Virgin Islands Olympic Committee
- Website: www.virginislandsolympics.com

in Salt Lake City
- Competitors: 8 (6 men, 2 women) in 2 sports
- Flag bearer: Dinah Browne (luge)
- Medals: Gold 0 Silver 0 Bronze 0 Total 0

Winter Olympics appearances (overview)
- 1988; 1992; 1994; 1998; 2002; 2006; 2010; 2014; 2018; 2022; 2026; 2030

The United States Virgin Islands competed at the 2002 Winter Olympics in Salt Lake City, United States.

== Bobsleigh ==
Men

Sled	Athletes	Event	Run 1		Run 2		Run 3		Run 4		Total	
Sled	Athletes	Event	Time	Rank	Time	Rank	Time	Rank	Time	Rank	Time	Rank
ISV-1	Quinn Wheeler; Zachary Zoller	Two-man	49.81	37	49.76	36	49.86	35	50.01	37	3:19.44	36

Sled	Athletes	Event	Run 1		Run 2		Run 3		Run 4		Total	
Sled	Athletes	Event	Time	Rank	Time	Rank	Time	Rank	Time	Rank	Time	Rank
ISV-1	Keith Sudziarski; Paul Zar; Christian Brown; Michael Savitch	Four-man	51.36	33	DNF	–	–	–	–	–	DNF	–

== Luge ==
Women

Athlete	Run 1		Run 2		Run 3		Run 4		Total	
Athlete	Time	Rank	Time	Rank	Time	Rank	Time	Rank	Time	Rank
Dinah Browne	45.603	28	44.585	27	44.857	27	44.700	27	2:59.745	28
Anne Abernathy	44.491	24	44.740	28	44.619	26	44.579	26	2:58.429	26
