= Virgin Islands at the 1994 Winter Olympics =

- Flag of the United States Virgin Islands
- IOC code: ISV
- NOC: Virgin Islands Olympic Committee
- Website: www.virginislandsolympics.com

in Lillehammer
- Competitors: 8 in 2 sports
- Flag bearer: Kyle Heikkila
- Medals: Gold 0 Silver 0 Bronze 0 Total 0

Winter Olympics appearances (overview)
- 1988; 1992; 1994; 1998; 2002; 2006; 2010; 2014; 2018; 2022; 2026

The United States Virgin Islands competed at the 1994 Winter Olympics in Lillehammer, Norway.

== Competitors ==
The following is the list of number of competitors in the Games.

Sport	Men	Women	Total
Bobsleigh	6	–	6
Luge	1	1	2
Total	7	1	8

== Bobsleigh ==
Sled	Athletes	Event	Run 1		Run 2		Run 3		Run 4		Total	
Sled	Athletes	Event	Time	Rank	Time	Rank	Time	Rank	Time	Rank	Time	Rank
ISV-1	Keith Sudziarski; Todd Schultz	Two-man	55.16	39	55.13	40	55.24	38	55.25	40	3:40.78	38
ISV-2	Zachary Zoller; Paul Zar	Two-man	56.01	43	56.57	43	56.15	42	56.28	42	3:45.01	42

Sled	Athletes	Event	Run 1		Run 2		Run 3		Run 4		Total	
Sled	Athletes	Event	Time	Rank	Time	Rank	Time	Rank	Time	Rank	Time	Rank
ISV-1	Zachary Zoller; Paul Zar; David Entwistle; Alexander Poe	Four-man	53.79	29	53.82	29	54.23	28	53.81	27	3:35.65	28

== Luge ==
Men

Athlete	Event	Run 1		Run 2		Run 3		Run 4		Total	
Athlete	Event	Time	Rank	Time	Rank	Time	Rank	Time	Rank	Time	Rank
Kyle Heikkila	Singles	52.007	26	52.007	24	51.519	20	51.703	21	3:27.236	23

Women

Athlete	Event	Run 1		Run 2		Run 3		Run 4		Total	
Athlete	Event	Time	Rank	Time	Rank	Time	Rank	Time	Rank	Time	Rank
Anne Abernathy	Singles	50.698	22	50.190	19	49.776	18	50.167	19	3:20.831	20

== Sources ==
- Official Olympic Reports
