= Virgin Islands at the 2019 World Aquatics Championships =

- Flag of the United States Virgin Islands
- World Aquatics code: ISV
- National federation: Virgin Islands Swimming Federation

in Gwangju, South Korea
- Competitors: 3 in 1 sport
- Medals: Gold 0 Silver 0 Bronze 0 Total 0

World Aquatics Championships appearances
- 1973; 1975; 1978; 1982; 1986; 1991; 1994; 1998; 2001; 2003; 2005; 2007; 2009; 2011; 2013; 2015; 2017; 2019; 2022; 2023; 2024; 2025

Virgin Islands competed at the 2019 World Aquatics Championships in Gwangju, South Korea from 12 to 28 July.

== Swimming ==
Virgin Islands entered three swimmers.

Men

| Athlete | Event | Heat | | Semifinal | | Final | |
| Athlete | Event | Time | Rank | Time | Rank | Time | Rank |
|---|---|---|---|---|---|---|---|
| Matthew Mays | 200 m backstroke | 2:07.03 | 40 | did not advance | | | |
| Matthew Mays | 200 m butterfly | 2:03.47 NR | 41 | did not advance | | | |
| Adriel Sanes | 100 m breaststroke | 1:02.91 | 53 | did not advance | | | |
| Adriel Sanes | 200 m breaststroke | 2:17.57 | 44 | did not advance | | | |

Women

| Athlete | Event | Heat | | Semifinal | | Final | |
| Athlete | Event | Time | Rank | Time | Rank | Time | Rank |
|---|---|---|---|---|---|---|---|
| Natalia Kuipers | 200 m freestyle | 2:15.45 | 52 | did not advance | | | |
| Natalia Kuipers | 400 m freestyle | 4:41.69 | 42 | —N/a | | did not advance | |
