= Virgin Islands at the 2022 World Aquatics Championships =

- Flag of the United States Virgin Islands
- World Aquatics code: ISV
- National federation: Virgin Islands Swimming Federation

in Budapest, Hungary
- Competitors: 2 in 1 sport
- Medals: Gold 0 Silver 0 Bronze 0 Total 0

World Aquatics Championships appearances
- 1973; 1975; 1978; 1982; 1986; 1991; 1994; 1998; 2001; 2003; 2005; 2007; 2009; 2011; 2013; 2015; 2017; 2019; 2022; 2023; 2024; 2025

The Virgin Islands participated in the 2022 World Aquatics Championships, held in Budapest, Hungary, from June 17, 2022, to July 3, 2022.

== Swimming ==
Virgin Islands entered two swimmers.

Men

Athlete	Event	Heat		Semifinal		Final	
Athlete	Event	Time	Rank	Time	Rank	Time	Rank
Adriel Sanes	100 m breaststroke	DSQ		did not advance			
Adriel Sanes	200 m breaststroke	2:20.41	34	did not advance			

Women

Athlete	Event	Heat		Semifinal		Final	
Athlete	Event	Time	Rank	Time	Rank	Time	Rank
Natalia Kuipers	200 m freestyle	2:12.20	33	did not advance			
Natalia Kuipers	400 m freestyle	4:33.54	29	—N/a		did not advance	
