= Virgin Islands at the 2023 World Aquatics Championships =

- Flag of Virgin Islands
- World Aquatics code: ISV
- National federation: Virgin Islands Swimming Federation

in Fukuoka, Japan
- Competitors: 3 in 1 sport
- Medals: Gold 0 Silver 0 Bronze 0 Total 0

World Aquatics Championships appearances
- 1973; 1975; 1978; 1982; 1986; 1991; 1994; 1998; 2001; 2003; 2005; 2007; 2009; 2011; 2013; 2015; 2017; 2019; 2022; 2023; 2024; 2025

The Virgin Islands has competed in the 2023 World Aquatics Championships in Fukuoka, Japan from 14 to 30 July.

== Swimming ==
The Virgin Islands entered 3 swimmers.

Men

Athlete	Event	Heat		Semifinal		Final	
Athlete	Event	Time	Rank	Time	Rank	Time	Rank
Adriel Sanes	200 metre breaststroke	2:22.20	38	Did not advance			
Adriel Sanes	50 metre butterfly	25.28	60	Did not advance			
Maximillian Wilson	50 metre backstroke	26.62	43	Did not advance			
Maximillian Wilson	100 metre backstroke	56.65	40	Did not advance			

Women

Athlete	Event	Heat		Semifinal		Final	
Athlete	Event	Time	Rank	Time	Rank	Time	Rank
Natalia Kuipers	200 metre freestyle	2:12.60	56	Did not advance			
Natalia Kuipers	400 metre freestyle	4:38.00	40	—N/a		Did not advance	
