= Virgin Islands at the 2017 World Aquatics Championships =

- Flag of the United States Virgin Islands
- World Aquatics code: ISV
- National federation: US Virgin Islands Swimming

in Budapest, Hungary
- Competitors: 2 in 1 sport
- Medals: Gold 0 Silver 0 Bronze 0 Total 0

World Aquatics Championships appearances
- 1973; 1975; 1978; 1982; 1986; 1991; 1994; 1998; 2001; 2003; 2005; 2007; 2009; 2011; 2013; 2015; 2017; 2019; 2022; 2023; 2024; 2025

The United States Virgin Islands competed at the 2017 World Aquatics Championships in Budapest, Hungary from 14 July to 30 July.

== Swimming ==
U.S. Virgin Islands has received a Universality invitation from FINA to send two male swimmers to the World Championships.

Athlete	Event	Heat		Semifinal		Final	
Athlete	Event	Time	Rank	Time	Rank	Time	Rank
Gregory Penny	Men's 50 m breaststroke	29.96	55	did not advance			
Gregory Penny	Men's 100 m breaststroke	1:05.16	=56	did not advance			
Adriel Sanes	Men's 200 m breaststroke	2:20.92	35	did not advance			
Adriel Sanes	Men's 200 m individual medley	2:09.20	41	did not advance			
