= Bobsleigh at the 1994 Winter Olympics – Two-man =

Two-man at the XVII Olympic Winter Games
- Venue: Lillehammer Olympic Bobsleigh and Luge Track
- Dates: 19–20 February 1994
- Competitors: 84 from 29 nations
- Winning time: 3:30.81

Medalists
1st place, gold medalist(s)		Gustav Weder; Donat Acklin	Switzerland
2nd place, silver medalist(s)		Reto Götschi; Guido Acklin	Switzerland
3rd place, bronze medalist(s)		Günther Huber; Stefano Ticci	Italy

Two-man bobsleigh at the 1994 Winter Olympics took place on 19 and 20 February 1994 at Lillehammer Olympic Bobsleigh and Luge Track.

== Results ==
Rank	Bib	Country	Athletes	Run 1	Run 2	Run 3	Run 4	Total	Behind
1st place, gold medalist(s)	1	Switzerland (SUI-1)	Gustav Weder; Donat Acklin	52.33	52.91	52.72	52.85	3:30.81	–
2nd place, silver medalist(s)	6	Switzerland (SUI-2)	Reto Götschi; Guido Acklin	52.38	52.76	52.79	52.93	3:30.86	+0.05
3rd place, bronze medalist(s)	10	Italy (ITA-1)	Günther Huber; Stefano Ticci	52.61	52.80	52.69	52.91	3:31.01	+0.20
4	15	Germany (GER-1)	Rudi Lochner; Markus Zimmermann	52.74	53.09	52.76	53.19	3:31.78	+0.97
5	7	Austria (AUT-1)	Hubert Schösser; Thomas Schroll	52.71	53.02	52.94	53.26	3:31.93	+1.12
6	12	Great Britain (GBR-1)	Mark Tout; Lennox Paul	52.77	53.15	52.99	53.24	3:32.15	+1.34
7	3	Czech Republic (CZE-1)	Jiří Džmura; Pavel Polomský	52.66	53.18	53.02	53.32	3:32.18	+1.37
7	2	Canada (CAN-1)	Pierre Lueders; David MacEachern	52.63	53.25	53.11	53.19	3:32.18	+1.37
9	13	Italy (ITA-2)	Pasquale Gesuito; Antonio Tartaglia	52.92	53.33	52.89	53.31	3:32.45	+1.64
10	17	Great Britain (GBR-2)	Sean Olsson; Paul Field	52.86	53.30	53.21	53.46	3:32.83	+2.02
10	4	Latvia (LAT-1)	Zintis Ekmanis; Aldis Intlers	52.75	53.42	53.20	53.46	3:32.83	+2.02
12	11	Germany (GER-2)	Sepp Dostthaler; Bogdan Musioł	53.02	53.48	53.10	53.24	3:32.84	+2.03
13	14	United States (USA-2)	Brian Shimer; Randy Jones	52.99	53.37	52.86	53.63	3:32.85	+2.04
14	9	United States (USA-1)	Jim Herberich; Nathan Minton III	53.04	53.58	53.29	53.50	3:33.41	+2.60
15	8	Canada (CAN-2)	Christopher Lori; Glenroy Gilbert	52.99	53.72	53.22	53.56	3:33.49	+2.68
16	18	Latvia (LAT-2)	Sandis Prusis; Adris Pluksna	53.31	53.40	53.35	53.52	3:33.58	+2.77
17	5	Austria (AUT-2)	Kurt Einberger; Martin Schuetzenauer	53.13	53.63	53.32	53.61	3:33.69	+2.88
18	16	Japan (JPN-2)	Naomi Takewaki; Hiroshi Suzuki	53.08	53.72	53.47	53.73	3:34.00	+3.19
19	21	Japan (JPN-1)	Toshio Wakita; Takashi Ohori	53.43	53.51	53.47	53.69	3:34.10	+3.29
20	19	Czech Republic (CZE-2)	Pavel Puskar; Jan Kobian	53.44	53.42	53.54	53.85	3:34.25	+3.44
21	24	France (FRA-1)	Christophe Flacher; Max Robert	53.44	53.60	53.47	53.79	3:34.30	+3.49
22	22	Sweden	Fredrik Gustafsson; Hans Byberg	53.40	53.69	53.60	53.84	3:34.53	+3.72
23	25	France (FRA-2)	Gabriel Fourmigué; Philippe Tanchon	53.54	53.70	53.58	53.98	3:34.80	+3.99
24	23	Netherlands	Rob Geurts; Robert Dewit	53.52	53.90	53.76	53.89	3:35.07	+4.26
25	29	Bulgaria	Zvetozar Viktorov; Valentin Atanassov	53.79	53.85	54.20	53.97	3:35.81	+5.00
26	41	Russia (RUS-1)	Oleg Sukhoruchenko; Andrej Gorohov	53.88	54.11	54.09	54.01	3:36.09	+5.28
27	26	Australia	Justin McDonald; Glenn Carroll	54.03	53.96	54.21	54.27	3:36.47	+5.66
28	34	Hungary	Nicholas Frankl; Miklos Gyulai	54.14	54.27	54.16	54.49	3:37.06	+6.25
29	36	Russia (RUS-2)	Vladimir Yefimov; Oleg Petrov	54.19	54.21	54.30	54.40	3:37.10	+6.29
30	32	Romania	Florian Enache; Mihai Dumitrașcu	54.35	54.38	54.47	54.85	3:38.05	+7.24
31	20	Monaco	Albert Grimaldi; Gilbert Bessi	54.14	54.73	54.57	54.83	3:38.27	+7.46
32	43	Ukraine	Oleksiy Zhukov; Alexandre Bortiouk	54.71	54.64	54.78	54.61	3:38.74	+7.93
33	38	Bosnia and Herzegovina	Zdravko Stojnic; Zoran Sokolović	54.76	54.83	54.82	54.66	3:39.07	+8.26
34	31	Greece	Greg Sebald; Marinos Khristopoulos	54.83	54.83	55.03	54.71	3:39.40	+8.59
35	35	Chinese Taipei	Kuang-Ming Sun; Min-Jung Chang	54.48	54.63	55.24	55.09	3:39.44	+8.63
36	37	Armenia	Joe Almasian; Ken Topalian	54.85	55.03	54.92	55.01	3:39.81	+9.00
37	40	Trinidad and Tobago	Gregory Sun; Curtis Harry	55.09	54.88	55.14	55.13	3:40.24	+9.43
38	30	Virgin Islands (ISV-1)	Keith Sudziarski; Todd Schultz	55.16	55.13	55.24	55.25	3:40.78	+9.97
39	33	American Samoa	Tia Muagututia; Brad Kiltz	55.57	55.25	55.06	55.16	3:41.04	+10.23
40	27	Puerto Rico	John Amabile; Jorge Bonnet	55.18	55.46	55.38	55.19	3:41.21	+10.40
41	42	San Marino	Dino Crescentini; Mike Crocenzi	55.36	55.11	55.35	55.43	3:41.25	+10.44
42	39	Virgin Islands (ISV-2)	Zachary Zoller; Paul Zar	56.01	56.57	56.15	56.28	3:45.01	+14.20
	28	Jamaica	Dudley Stokes; Wayne Thomas	53.59	53.81	53.76	DSQ		
