= Virgin Islands at the 2014 Winter Olympics =

- Flag of the United States Virgin Islands
- IOC code: ISV
- NOC: Virgin Islands Olympic Committee
- Website: www.virginislandsolympics.com

in Sochi
- Competitors: 1 in 1 sport
- Flag bearers: Jasmine Campbell (opening and closing)
- Medals: Gold 0 Silver 0 Bronze 0 Total 0

Winter Olympics appearances (overview)
- 1988; 1992; 1994; 1998; 2002; 2006; 2010; 2014; 2018; 2022; 2026

The United States Virgin Islands (USVI) sent a delegation to compete at the 2014 Winter Olympics held in Sochi, Russia from 7–23 February 2014. This marked the return of the Virgin Islands to the Winter Olympics after missing the 2010 edition, and was their sixth time competing at a Winter Olympic Games. The USVI team consisted of one athlete in alpine skiing, Jasmine Campbell. She finished 56th in the giant slalom and 43rd in the slalom.

== Background ==
The Virgin Islands Olympic Committee was first recognized by the International Olympic Committee on 31 December 1966. The USVI have sent competitors to every Summer Olympic Games since, except the boycotted 1980 Moscow Olympics. The territory first sent athletes to a Winter Olympic Games in 1988. The USVI had their only athlete at the 2006 Winter Olympics—Anne Abernathy—break her wrist in training, and they missed the 2010 Winter Olympics, making Sochi the sixth time the USVI actually competed in the Winter Olympics. Alpine skier Jasmine Campbell was the only athlete the USVI sent to Sochi. Campbell was selected as the flag bearer for both the opening ceremony and closing ceremony. She was accompanied to Sochi by her coach and father, John Campbell, who had represented the Virgin Islands at the 1992 Winter Olympics in alpine skiing.

== Alpine skiing ==
The Virgin Islands qualified one female alpine skier for the 2014 Winter Olympics. Jasmine Campbell secured qualification on 20 January 2014. She was born on Saint John, USVI and moved to Idaho at the age of nine. Campbell was 22 years old at the time of the Sochi Olympics, and was making her Olympic debut. About her Olympic participation she said "I will consider my time at the Olympics a success by doing my own personal best, while connecting with this very special community of athletes. I greatly appreciate this immense honor to participate in such a unique international forum whose goal is to be a symbol of human excellence and transcendence, in an environment of peace." On 18 February she took part in the two-run women's giant slalom race. She finished the first leg in 1 minute and 32.05 seconds, and the second in 1 minute and 33.00 seconds. Her total time of 3 minutes and 5.05 seconds put her in 56th place, out of 67 competitors who finished both legs of the race. The gold medal was won by Tina Maze of Slovenia in a time of 2 minutes and 36.87 seconds; the silver medal was won by Anna Fenninger of Austria, and the bronze was earned by Viktoria Rebensburg of Germany.

On 21 February, Campbell participated in the women's slalom, which was also a two-run event. She completed her first run in 1 minute and 6.09 seconds, and her second in a faster 1 minute and 4.28 seconds. Her total time for the event was thus 2 minutes and 10.37 seconds, which put her in 43rd place out of 49 competitors who completed both runs. The gold medal was won by Mikaela Shiffrin of the United States in 1 minute and 44.54 seconds; silver and bronze were both earned by Austrians, Marlies Schild and Kathrin Zettel respectively.

Athlete	Event	Run 1		Run 2		Total	
Athlete	Event	Time	Rank	Time	Rank	Time	Rank
Jasmine Campbell	Women's giant slalom	1:32.05	62	1:33.00	57	3:05.05	56
Jasmine Campbell	Women's slalom	1:06.09	50	1:04.28	43	2:10.37	43

== See also ==
- Virgin Islands at the 2014 Summer Youth Olympics
