= American Samoa at the 2022 Winter Olympics =

- IOC code: ASA
- NOC: American Samoa National Olympic Committee

in Beijing, China February 4–20, 2022
- Competitors: 1 (1 man) in 1 sport
- Flag bearer (opening): Nathan Crumpton
- Flag bearer (closing): Nathan Crumpton
- Medals: Gold 0 Silver 0 Bronze 0 Total 0

Winter Olympics appearances (overview)
- 1994; 1998–2018; 2022; 2026

American Samoa competed at the 2022 Winter Olympics in Beijing, China, which were held from February 4 to 22, 2022. The territory's participation in Beijing marked its second appearance and return to the Winter Games since its debut in 1994. Nathan Crumpton was the sole athlete competing for the territory; he would compete in skeleton. Crumpton previously competed at the 2020 Summer Olympics, which made him the first American Samoan athlete to compete at the Summer and Winter Games. He was the flagbearer for the territory at the opening ceremony and closing ceremony, and he went viral for being shirtless during the ceremonies.

Crumpton qualified for the games based on his rank on the International Bobsleigh and Skeleton Federation's ranking list. He competed in the men's skeleton and placed nineteenth, which was the highest placement of the territory at the Winter Games. American Samoa has yet to win a medal in any Olympic Games.

== Background ==
The 2022 Winter Olympics were held from February 4 to 20, 2022, in the city of Beijing, China. This edition marked American Samoa's second appearance and return to the Winter Olympics since its debut at the 1994 Winter Olympics in Lillehammer, Norway, though they have participated in every Summer Olympics since the 1988. The nation had never won a medal at any Olympic Games, with its best performance coming from boxer Maselino Masoe placing joint fifth in the men's light middleweight event at the 1992 Summer Olympics in Barcelona, Spain. Its highest placement at the Winter Games were from bobsledders Brad Kiltz and Faauuga Muagututia, who came 39th in the two-man event.

== Delegation and ceremonies ==
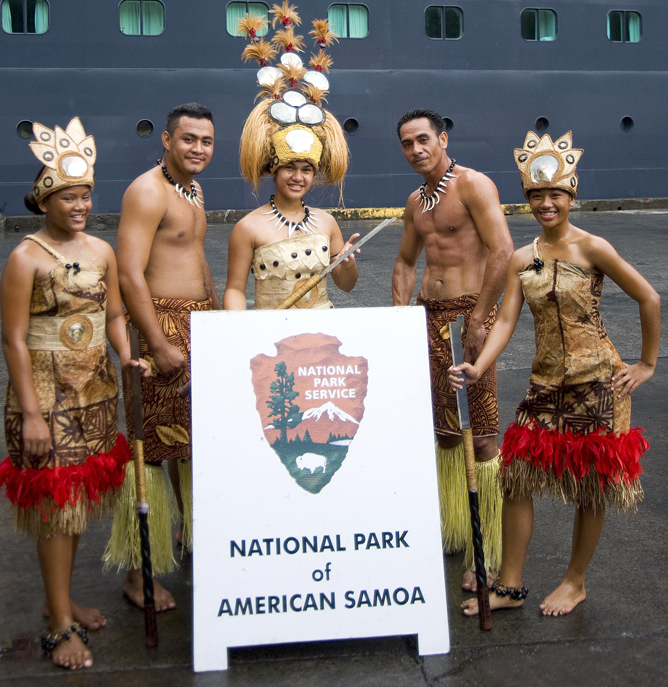
Traditional Samoan clothing similar to Crumpton's for the opening ceremony

The American Samoan delegation was composed of two people. The official present was chef de mission Ryan Leong, who was also the swimming coach for the territory's swimmers at the 2020 Summer Olympics in Tokyo, Japan. The sole athlete was skeleton racer Nathan Crumpton, who also competed for the territory at the 2020 Summer Olympics in the men's 100 metres in athletics, making him the first American Samoan athlete to compete at the Summer and Winter Games. Crumpton previously represented the United States in international competition and placed as high as eighth place at the World Championships. In 2019, an arbitration case was filed by a teammate against the United States Bobsled and Skeleton Federation that confronted the federation's process of selecting athletes for World Cup events. This resulted in Crumpton not being able to compete for the World Cup and World Championships that season, where he then left the team. Through his Hawaiian maternal grandmother, he managed to qualify for the American Samoan team as the American Samoa National Olympic Committee lets athletes of other Polynesian diaspora compete for them.

The American Samoan delegation came in 57th out of the 91 National Olympic Committees in the 2022 Winter Olympics Parade of Nations within the opening ceremony. Crumpton held the flag for the delegation. He wore a tapa cloth, an ʻie tōga, and a feathered kiki fulumoa around his waist; he also wore a fuiono headpiece with nautilus shells, an ula nifo and ula fala necklaces, armbands that had wild boar tusks, and flipflops. Additionally, he was shirtless and covered with baby oil which made him go viral, with a spike for Google searches of the territory and a hashtag being used across social media due to his attractiveness. Cross-country skier Pita Taufatofua of Tonga had a similar case during his stint at the 2018 Winter Olympics, opining on the same day of the ceremony that the territory was "holding the fort" as he could not attend the games. At the closing ceremony, Crumpton was the flagbearer and was shirtless again.

== Competitors ==
List of American Samoan competitors at the 2022 Winter Olympics
Sport	Men	Women	Total
Skeleton	1	0	1
Total	1	0	1

== Skeleton ==
=== Qualification and lead-up to the games ===
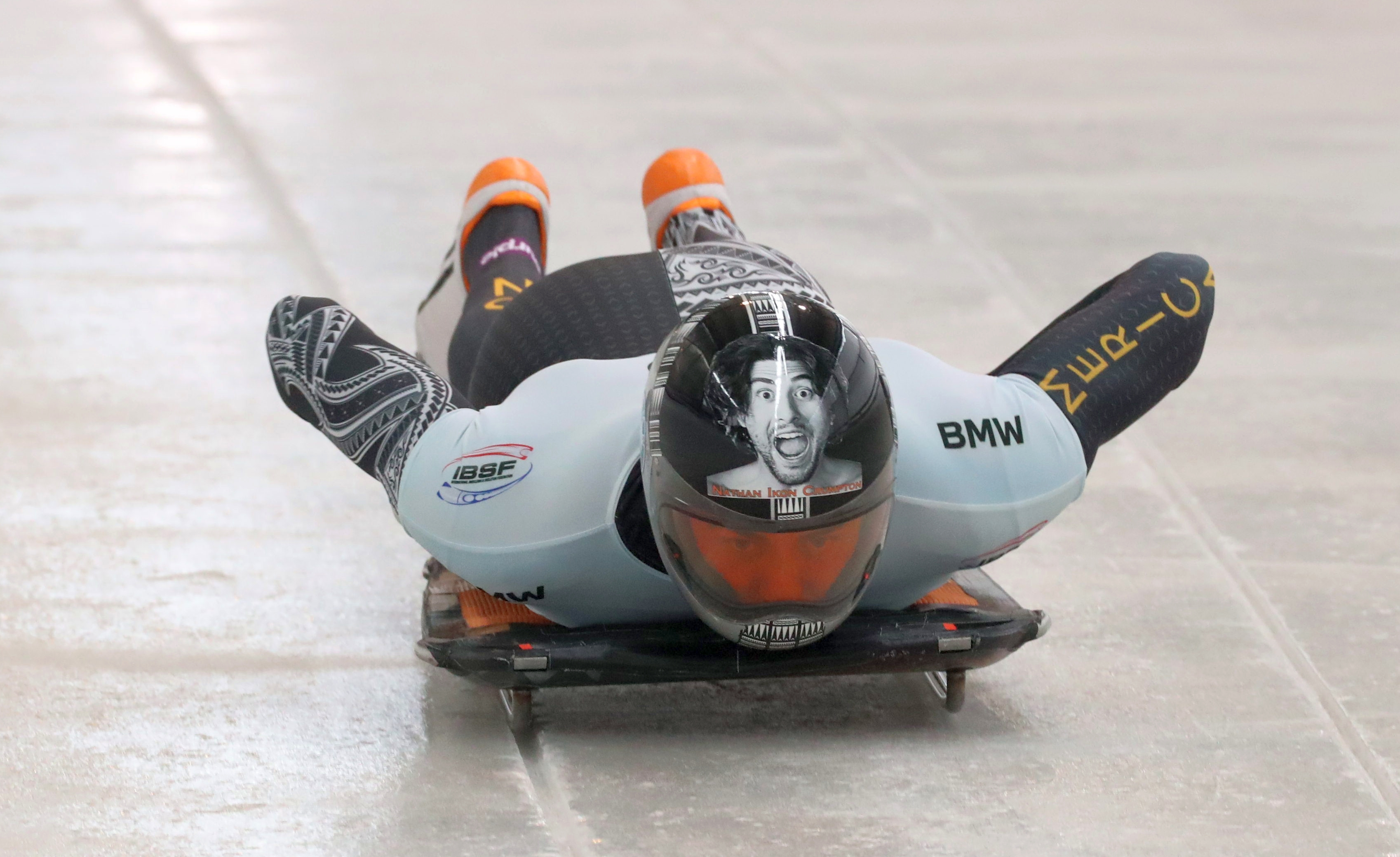
Crumpton at the 2021 IBSF World Championships, one of the qualifying events for the games.

Crumpton flew to the territory in 2019 to revive the American Samoa Bobsled Federation's status with the International Bobsleigh and Skeleton Federation (IBSF) as it had been dormant since the territory's Winter Olympic debut in 1994. He paid 300 euros to the IBSF and filled in some paperwork to reactivate its status. Training without a coach, he partnered with the British skeleton team to record his runs to review. He received a scholarship from the International Olympic Committee to help with his training, though has stated that he had spent $40,000 for his preparations. He had also set up a GoFundMe page and sold his own books about missing the 2018 Winter Olympics due to having a herniated disc.

Before the games, Crumpton had competed in competitions such as the 2020 and 2021 IBSF World Championships to garner points and increase his ranking to qualify for the Winter Games. He garnered 548 points over 13 races for a placement of 29th on the IBSF ranking list, therefore qualifying him for the Winter Games.

=== Event ===
The skeleton events were held at the Yanqing National Sliding Centre. For the first and second runs, Crumpton competed on February 10 and recorded a time of 1:02.06 and 1:01.65 respectively. The following day, he recorded a time of 1:01.60 for his third run and thus qualified for a fourth run after placing in the initial top 20. For his last run, he recorded a time of 1:01.49 with a total of 4:06.80 and placed 19th out of the 25 athletes in the event. The eventual winner of the event was Christopher Grotheer of Germany, who recorded a time of 4:01.01. After the event, he announced his retirement from skeleton after the 2022 season, further stating "I realize that my days of top 10 World Cups and World Championship finishes are likely behind me", though expressed having fun competing nonetheless.

Skeleton summary
Athlete	Event	Run 1		Run 2		Run 3		Run 4		Total	
Athlete	Event	Time	Rank	Time	Rank	Time	Rank	Time	Rank	Time	Rank
Nathan Crumpton	Men's	1:02.06	22	1:01.65	17	1:01.60	17	1:01.49	18	4:06.80	19

== See also ==
- Tropical nations at the Winter Olympics
