= Virgin Islands at the 2015 World Aquatics Championships =

- Flag of the United States Virgin Islands
- World Aquatics code: ISV
- National federation: US Virgin Islands Swimming

in Kazan, Russia
- Competitors: 3 in 1 sport
- Medals: Gold 0 Silver 0 Bronze 0 Total 0

World Aquatics Championships appearances
- 1973; 1975; 1978; 1982; 1986; 1991; 1994; 1998; 2001; 2003; 2005; 2007; 2009; 2011; 2013; 2015; 2017; 2019; 2022; 2023; 2024; 2025

The United States Virgin Islands competed at the 2015 World Aquatics Championships held in Kazan, Russia from 24 July to 9 August 2015.

== Swimming ==
Swimmers from the Virgin Islands have achieved qualifying standards in the following events (up to a maximum of 2 swimmers in each event at the A-standard entry time, and 1 at the B-standard):

Men

Athlete	Event	Heat		Semifinal		Final	
Athlete	Event	Time	Rank	Time	Rank	Time	Rank
Adriel Sanes	100 m breaststroke	1:07.19	63	did not advance			
Adriel Sanes	200 m breaststroke	2:24.91	51	did not advance			
Rexford Tullius	100 m backstroke	55.88	37	did not advance			
Rexford Tullius	200 m backstroke	2:01.22	26	did not advance			

Women

Athlete	Event	Heat		Semifinal		Final	
Athlete	Event	Time	Rank	Time	Rank	Time	Rank
Caylee Watson	100 m backstroke	1:04.09	45	did not advance			
Caylee Watson	100 m butterfly	1:05.70	56	did not advance			
