= Virgin Islands at the 2006 Winter Olympics =

- Flag of the United States Virgin Islands
- IOC code: ISV
- NOC: Virgin Islands Olympic Committee
- Website: www.virginislandsolympics.com

in Turin
- Competitors: 1 in 1 sport
- Flag bearer: Anne Abernathy
- Medals: Gold 0 Silver 0 Bronze 0 Total 0

Winter Olympics appearances (overview)
- 1988; 1992; 1994; 1998; 2002; 2006; 2010; 2014; 2018; 2022; 2026

The United States Virgin Islands (USVI) sent a delegation to compete at the 2006 Winter Olympics in Turin, Italy from 10 to 26 February 2006. The only competitor sent by the USVI was Anne Abernathy, who broke her wrist in a practice run and was therefore unable to compete.

== Background ==
The Virgin Islands Olympic Committee was first recognized by the International Olympic Committee on 31 December 1966. The USVI have sent competitors to every Summer Olympic Games since, excepting the boycotted 1980 Moscow Olympics. The territory first sent athletes to a Winter Olympic Games in 1988, and competed in every Winter Olympics between 1988 and Turin. The United States Virgin Islands have won a medal in Olympic competition only once, by Peter Holmberg in sailing at the 1988 Summer Olympics. The 2006 Winter Olympics were held in Turin, Italy from 10–26 February 2006; a total of 2,508 athletes participated, representing 80 National Olympic Committees. The team the USVI sent to Turin consisted of a single luger, Anne Abernathy. She was the flag bearer for both the opening ceremony and the closing ceremony. In the closing ceremony, she intended to carry her red racing helmet in one hand, saying "Women of 50 all over the world can participate in life ... I’m passionate about my sport … I’m not over the hill."

== Luge ==
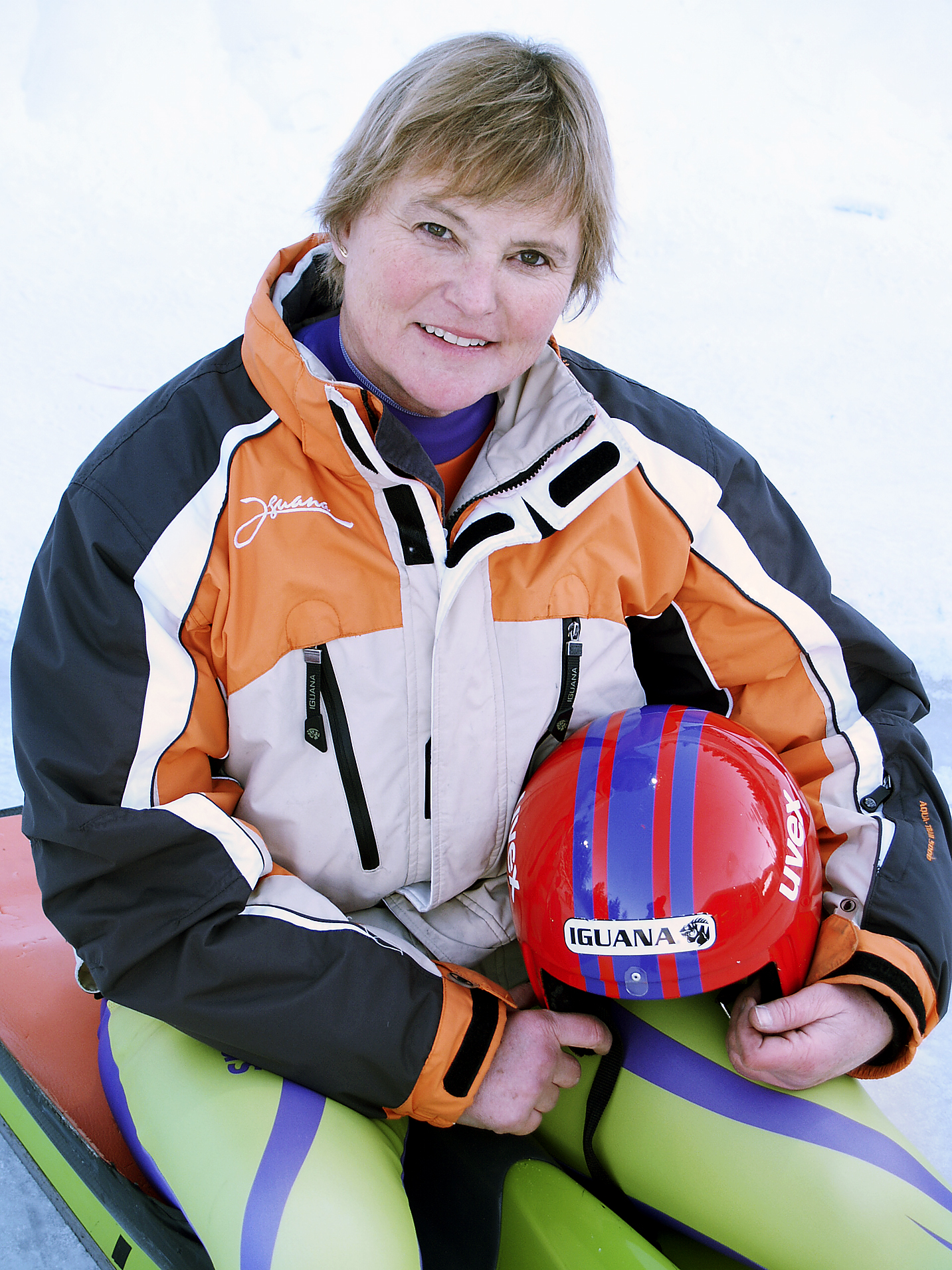
Anne Abernathy was the oldest female competitor at these Games.

Anne Abernathy, known by the nickname "Grandma Luge", was 52 years old at the time of the Turin Olympics. Abernathy was the oldest female athlete at these Olympics. About her age, she said, "It's a big deal for a lot of women that someone over 50 is going out there and doing it." She had represented the Virgin Islands at the five proceeding Winter Olympics. She was forced out of the women's singles competition due to a broken wrist suffered in her fifth training run on 12 February. Initially left off the start list entirely, a three-judge panel of the Court of Arbitration for Sport ruled on 17 February 2006 that she should officially be recorded as "Did Not Start". The other female lugers gifted her a signed start number 31, with Michelle Despain of Argentina writing "Thank you for your example, Anne." In the competition, the Germans swept the medals; Sylke Otto won gold; Silke Kraushaar-Pielach took the silver, and Tatjana Hüfner won the bronze.

== See also ==
- Virgin Islands at the Olympics
