= Rothschild Francis Square =

- Rothschild Francis Square (Market Square)
- U.S. National Register of Historic Places
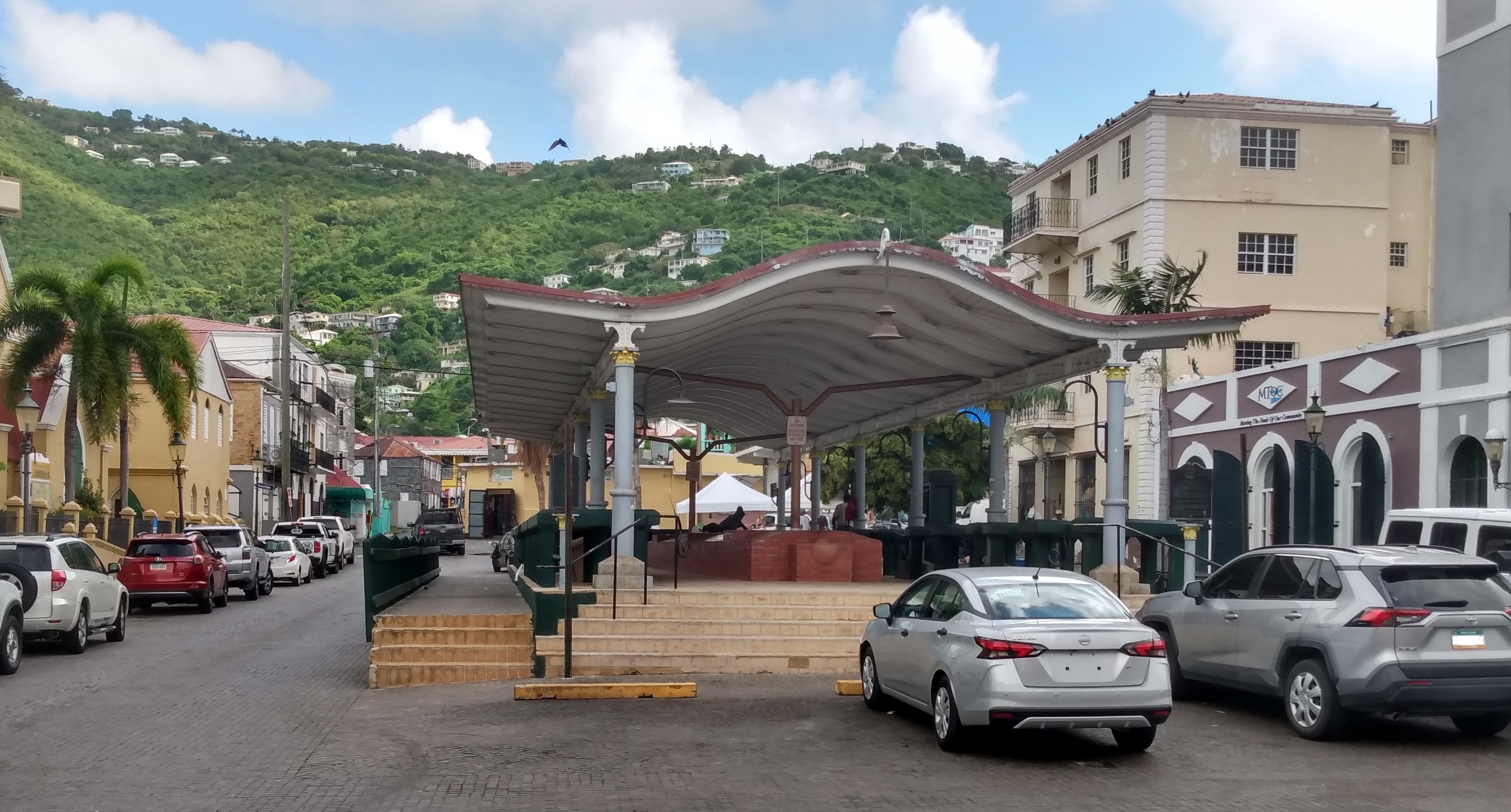
- Rothschild Francis Square (Market Square)
- Location: Kronprindsens Gade & Strand Gade, Charlotte Amalie, U.S. Virgin Islands
- Coordinates: 18.341375424498928°N 64.93479220945561°W
- Area: approx. 3000 square feet
- Part of: Charlotte Amalie Historic District (ID76001860)
- NRHP reference No.: 76001860
- Added to NRHP: July 19, 1976

Rothschild Francis Square (also known historically as "Market Square" and sometimes called the “Market Place”) is a historic public square located at the western end of Dronningens Gade (English: Queen Street but also known as “Main Street”) on the island of St. Thomas in the United States Virgin Islands. Its exact location is at the corner of Kronprindsens Gade & Strand Gade (English: Crown Prince Street and Beach Street), in the Charlotte Amalie Historic District of the historic town of Charlotte Amalie. Officially renamed Rothschild Francis Square in the 20th century, the site has long served as a center of commerce, culture, and community life.

== Historical significance ==
During the 18th and early 19th centuries, when the islands were the Danish West Indies, the Market Square functioned as one of the busiest slave markets in the Caribbean. Enslaved Africans were brought to the square to be auctioned, often transported through nearby alleyways and storage yards.

Charlotte Amalie’s status as a free port, established by the Danish government in 1764, and the Charlotte Amalie Harbor, helped make it one of the busiest slave trade centers in the Caribbean during the 18th and early 19th centuries. The lack of customs duties and the port’s accessibility to ships from all nations fostered high volumes of maritime trade, including the transatlantic slave trade. Large vessels transporting enslaved Africans could dock directly in the harbor, and enslaved individuals were often sold at Market Square, just a short distance inland. The town’s strategic location along major Atlantic shipping routes further strengthened its role as a commercial hub in the Danish West Indies.

After the abolition of slavery in 1848, the square transitioned into a general market space where both formerly enslaved and free residents sold fresh produce, fish, household items, and handmade goods. This custom continues today.

== Modern use and architecture ==
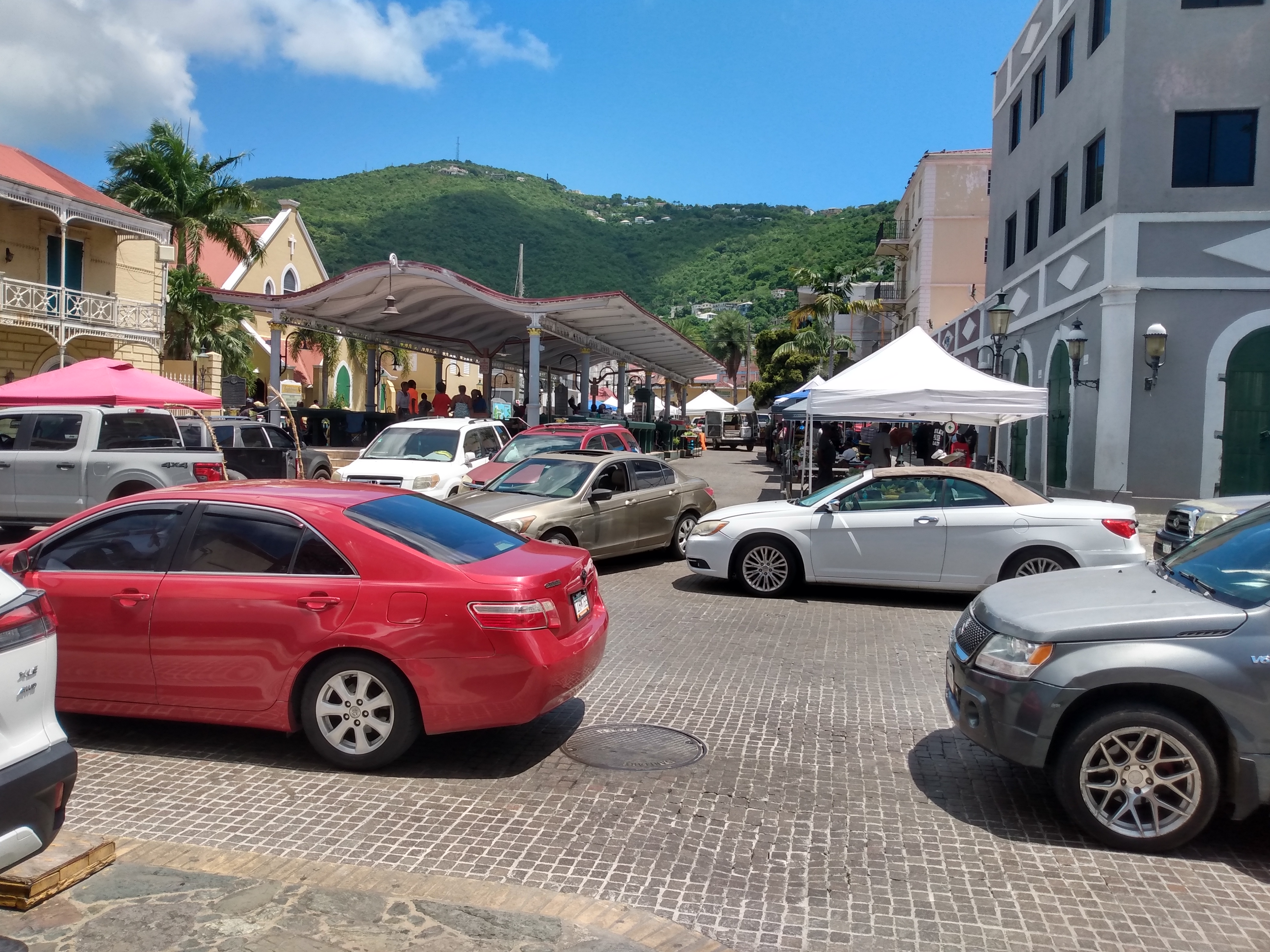
Saturday morning at the Market Square

The most prominent feature of Market Square today is its large cast-iron hipped roof structure, often described as a bungalow or canopy. This roof was repurposed from a railway station shed in the early 20th century and now serves to shelter local vendors from sun and rain. The square remains a hub for community gatherings and weekend farmers markets, especially on Saturday mornings when vendors arrive before dawn to sell fruits, vegetables, herbs, fabrics, and crafts.

== Cultural importance ==
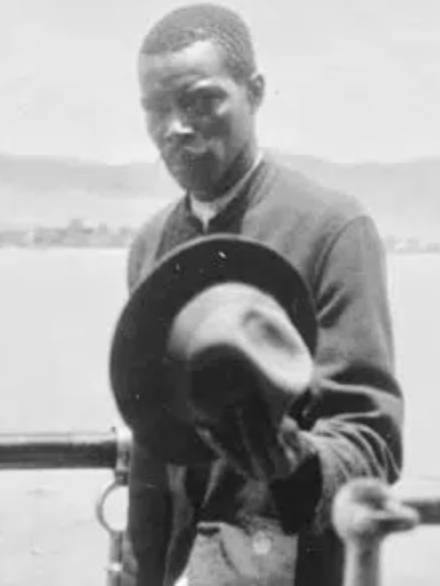
Rothschild Francis, pictured in the early 1920s

Market Square is one of the few remaining public spaces that directly connects modern life in Charlotte Amalie with its colonial and post-emancipation history. It continues to reflect the legacy of African-Caribbean culture through the sale of local produce, culinary ingredients, and handmade items. Despite periods of decline, the square has undergone revitalization efforts to improve its pedestrian environment and honor its historic and cultural role in the city.

The square was officially renamed Rothschild Francis Square in honor of Rothschild Francis, a civil rights advocate and newspaper publisher who fought for the rights of Virgin Islanders particularly during the early decades of U.S. administration of the territory. The Emancipator, which Francis founded, was influential in shaping public discourse and pushing for social reforms, including expanded voting rights and civil liberties. Despite its official designation, the name "Market Square" or "Marketplace" continues to be used informally by residents and tourists alike.
