= Virgin Islands at the 2022 Winter Olympics =

- IOC code: ISV
- NOC: Virgin Islands Olympic Committee
- Website: www.virginislandsolympics.com

in Beijing, China 4–20 February 2022
- Competitors: 1 (0 men and 1 woman) in 1 sport
- Flag bearer (opening): Volunteer
- Flag bearer (closing): Volunteer
- Medals: Gold 0 Silver 0 Bronze 0 Total 0

Winter Olympics appearances (overview)
- 1988; 1992; 1994; 1998; 2002; 2006; 2010; 2014; 2018; 2022; 2026

The Virgin Islands (Note: United States Virgin Islands participate in Olympics as Virgin Islands, while British Virgin Islands compete as a separate entity.) participated at the 2022 Winter Olympics in Beijing, China, from 4 to 20 February 2022. The country's participation in the Games marked its eighth appearance at the Winter Olympics after having made its debut in the 1988 Winter Olympics.

The Virgin Islands team consisted of a lone athlete Katie Tannenbaum, who competed in skeleton. As she tested positive for COVID-19 on the eve of the games, a volunteer served as the country's flag-bearer during the opening and closing ceremony. Virgin Islands did not win any medal in the Games, and has not won a Winter Olympics medal as of these Games.

== Background ==
The National Olympic Committee of Virgin Islands was formed in 1966 and was recognized by the International Olympic Committee (IOC) in 1967. Virgin Islands first participated in Olympic competition at the 1968 Summer Olympics, and have participated in most Olympic Games ever since. The 2022 Winter Olympics marked Virgin Islands's eighth participation in the Winter Olympics after having made its debut in the 1988 Winter Olympics.

The 2022 Winter Olympics was held in Beijing held between 4 and 20 February 2022. The Virgin Islands team consisted of a lone athlete Katie Tannenbaum, who competed in a single sport. As she tested positive for COVID-19 on the eve of the games, a volunteer served as the country's flag-bearer during the opening, Gatti carried the flag during the closing ceremony. Virgin Islands did not win any medal in the Games, and had not won a Winter Olympics medal as of these Games.

== Competitors ==
Virgin Islands sent a lone athletes who competed in a single event in skeleton.

Sport	Men	Women	Total
Skeleton	0	1	1
Total	0	1	1

== Skeleton ==
The Virgin Islands qualified one sled in the women's event, after receiving a reallocated quota place. This marked the country's debut in the sport at the Winter Olympics. The event was held at Yanqing National Sliding Centre, Zhangshanying in Yanqing District. Katie Tannenbaum finished in last place in the women's singles event, with an overall ranking of 25.

Athlete	Event	Run 1		Run 2		Run 3		Run 4		Total	
Athlete	Event	Time	Rank	Time	Rank	Time	Rank	Time	Rank	Time	Rank
Katie Tannenbaum	Women's	1:06.48	25	1:07.36	25	1:04.84	25	did not advance		3:18.68	25
