= Garrett Muagututia =

American volleyball player (born 1988)

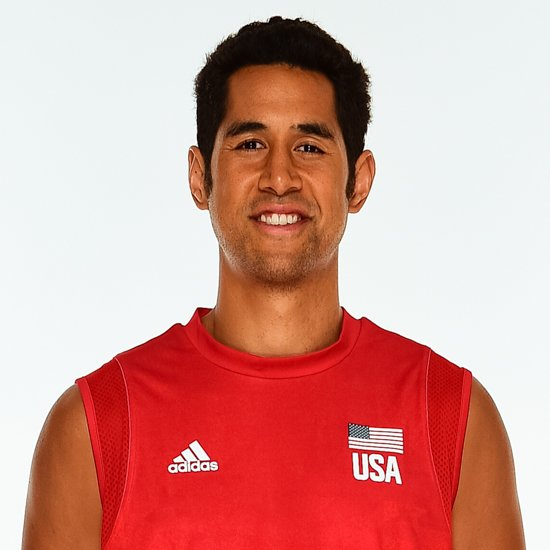
- Muagututia in 2020

Personal information
- Born: February 26, 1988 (age 38); Oceanside, California, U.S.
- Height: 6 ft 5 in (1.95 m)
- Weight: 203 lb (92 kg)
- Spike: 141 in (359 cm)
- Education: UCLA

Volleyball information
- Position: Outside hitter
- Current club: Sanest Khánh Hòa

Career
| Years | Teams |
|---|---|
| 2006–2010; 2010–2011; 2011–2012; 2012–2013; 2013; 2013–2014; 2014–2016; 2016–2017; 2018; 2019; 2019–2020; 2020–2021; 2021–2023; 2023; 2023–2024; 2024–2025; 2025–2026; 2026 | UCLA Bruins; Voley Guada; Raision Loimu; Impavida Ortona; Konak Belediyespor; Transfer Bydgoszcz; Fujian Volleyball; Tianjin Volleyball; Sporting CP; PAOK Thessaloniki; Calzedonia Verona; Warta Zawiercie; Al Ahly; Jakarta Bhayangkara Presisi; Al Ahly; Spor Toto SK; Patriotas de Lares; Sanest Khánh Hòa |

National team
| 2011– | United States |
Medal record
Men's volleyball
Representing United States
Olympic Games
| Bronze medal – third place | 2024 Paris | Team |
FIVB World Cup
| Gold medal – first place | 2023 Japan |
| Bronze medal – third place | 2019 Japan |
FIVB Nations League
| Silver medal – second place | 2019 Chicago |
| Silver medal – second place | 2022 Bologna |
| Silver medal – second place | 2023 Gdańsk |
FIVB World League
| Gold medal – first place | 2014 Florence |
Pan American Cup
| Gold medal – first place | 2012 Santo Domingo |
| Silver medal – second place | 2011 Gatineau |
NORCECA Championship
| Gold medal – first place | 2023 Charleston |

Garrett Muagututia (/muːˌɑːŋuːtuːˈtiːʔə/; born February 26, 1988) is an American professional volleyball player who plays as an outside hitter for Spor Toto SK and the U.S. national team. He played and studied for 4 years at the University of California, Los Angeles. Muagututia participated in the 2014 World Championship held in Poland.

== Personal life ==
His father, Faauuga Muagututia is a former United States Navy SEAL, a competitor for American Samoa at the 1994 Winter Olympics in bobsleigh.

== Honors ==
=== Club ===
- Domestic
  - 2017–18 Portuguese Championship, with Sporting CP
  - 2018–19 Greek Cup, with PAOK Thessaloniki

=== Individual awards ===
- 2019: Greek Cup – Most valuable player
