= Fort Christian =

- U.S. National Register of Historic Places
- U.S. National Historic Landmark
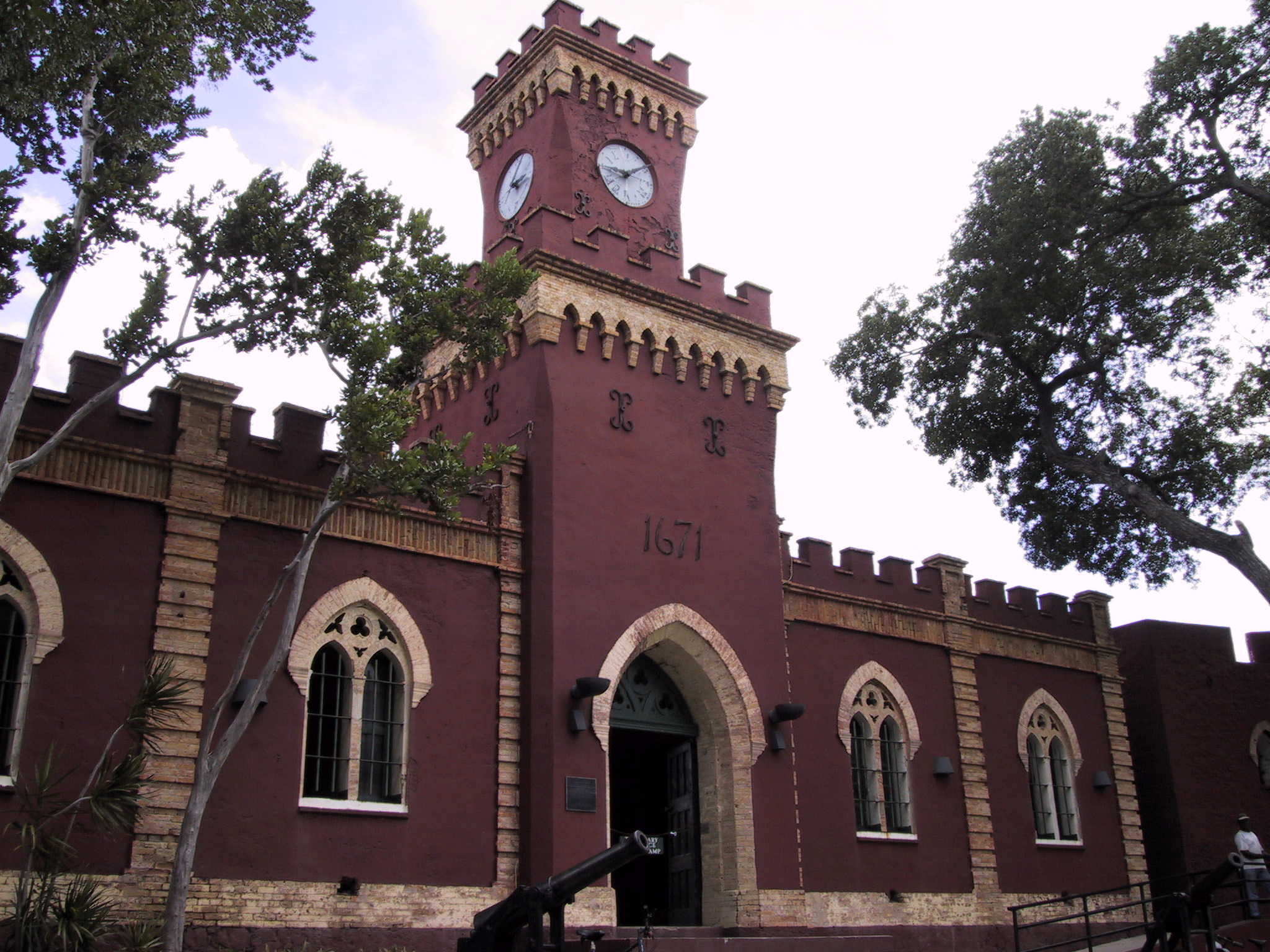
- View from the north

- Location within the U.S. Virgin Islands
- Location: Charlotte Amalie, United States Virgin Islands
- Coordinates: 18°20′27″N 64°55′47″W
- Area: 1.92 acres (0.78 ha)
- Built: c. 1666–1680
- Architect: Governor Jørgen Iversen
- Architectural style: Danish Military, Late Victorian, Gothic Revival
- NRHP reference No.: 77001329

Significant dates
- Added to NRHP: May 5, 1977
- Designated NHL: May 5, 1977

Fort Christian is a Dano-Norwegian-built fort in Charlotte Amalie, Saint Thomas, U.S. Virgin Islands. Built 1672-1680, early in the first successful colonial establishment on the island, the fort served as a critical point of defense and government during the entire period of Dano-Norwegian, and later Danish, administration, which ended in 1917 with the sale of the islands to the United States. It currently holds the St. Thomas Museum, which holds artifacts and art of the Dano-Norwegian period. It was designated a U.S. National Historic Landmark in 1977.

The fort property was the Charlotte Amalie National Historic Site, also known as St. Thomas National Historic Site, which was a U.S. National Historic Site from December 24, 1960 until February 5, 1975, when it was disbanded, and ownership was transferred to the Virgin Islands, to be administered as a territorial park. It is a contributing property in the Charlotte Amalie Historic District.

== Description and history ==
Fort Christian is located in central Charlotte Amalie, now separated from its harbor by Veterans Drive. The historical significance of its placement is obscured by the fact that it is now surrounded on its eastern and western flanks by made land; it originally occupied a narrow peninsula that jutted south into the harbor. The fort was a basically square structure with stone curtain walls and diamond-shaped stone bastions at the corners. The north, east, and west sides at one time were further augmented by ravelins, and there was originally a circular stone tower in the center of the fort. Of these structures, only three of the curtain walls and the four bastions remain, along with some living quarters built along the surviving curtain walls. The central tower was torn down in the 19th century, replaced by the present Gothic Revival structure.

The first attempt by the Dano-Norwegians to settle Saint Thomas took place in 1665, and failed in part because the colonists were caught between the actors of the Second Anglo-Dutch War, who raided them for supplies. Governor Jørgen Iversen Dyppel led the second expeditionary force from Denmark-Norway to St. Thomas, where he arrived on 25 May 1672; there, he initiated construction of Fort Christian, named after King Christian V. In the 18th century, the fort was expanded and in 1874 a new entrance with a Victorian Clock tower was added. As the oldest standing structure in the U.S. Virgin Islands, this fort has served as a town center, a government building, and a jail.

After being closed for a decade for renovations, the fort reopened in 2017 for the Transfer Day centennial.

== Gallery ==
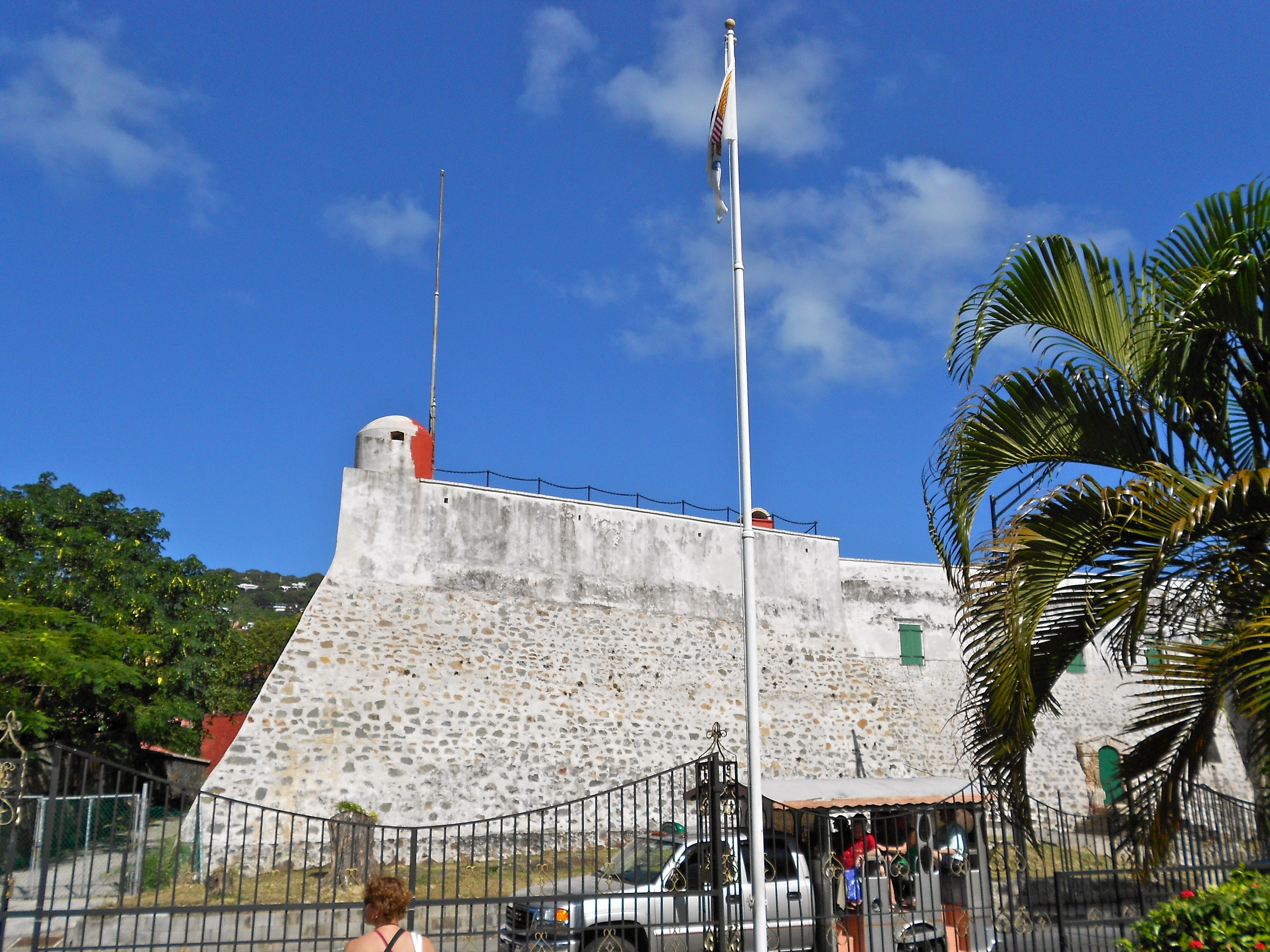
View from the east

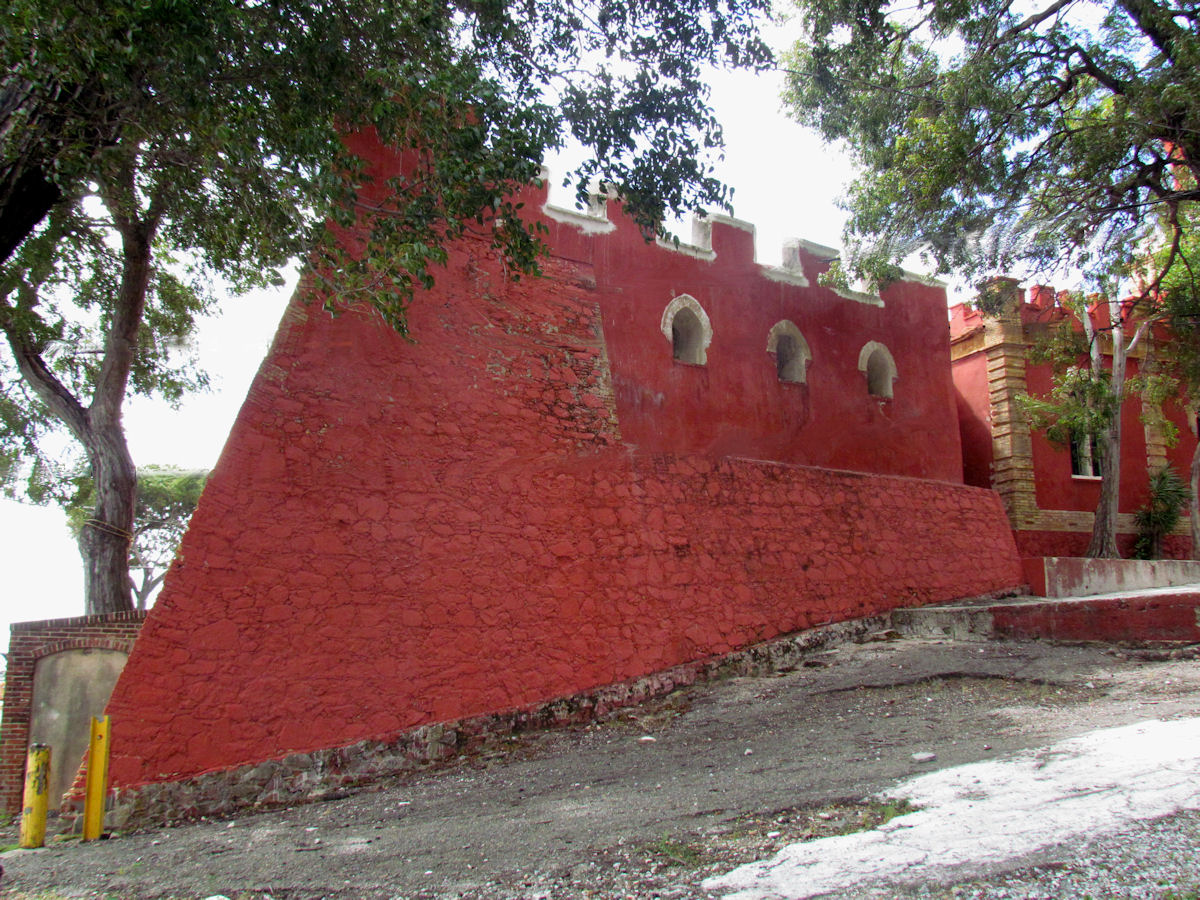
Northeast bastion

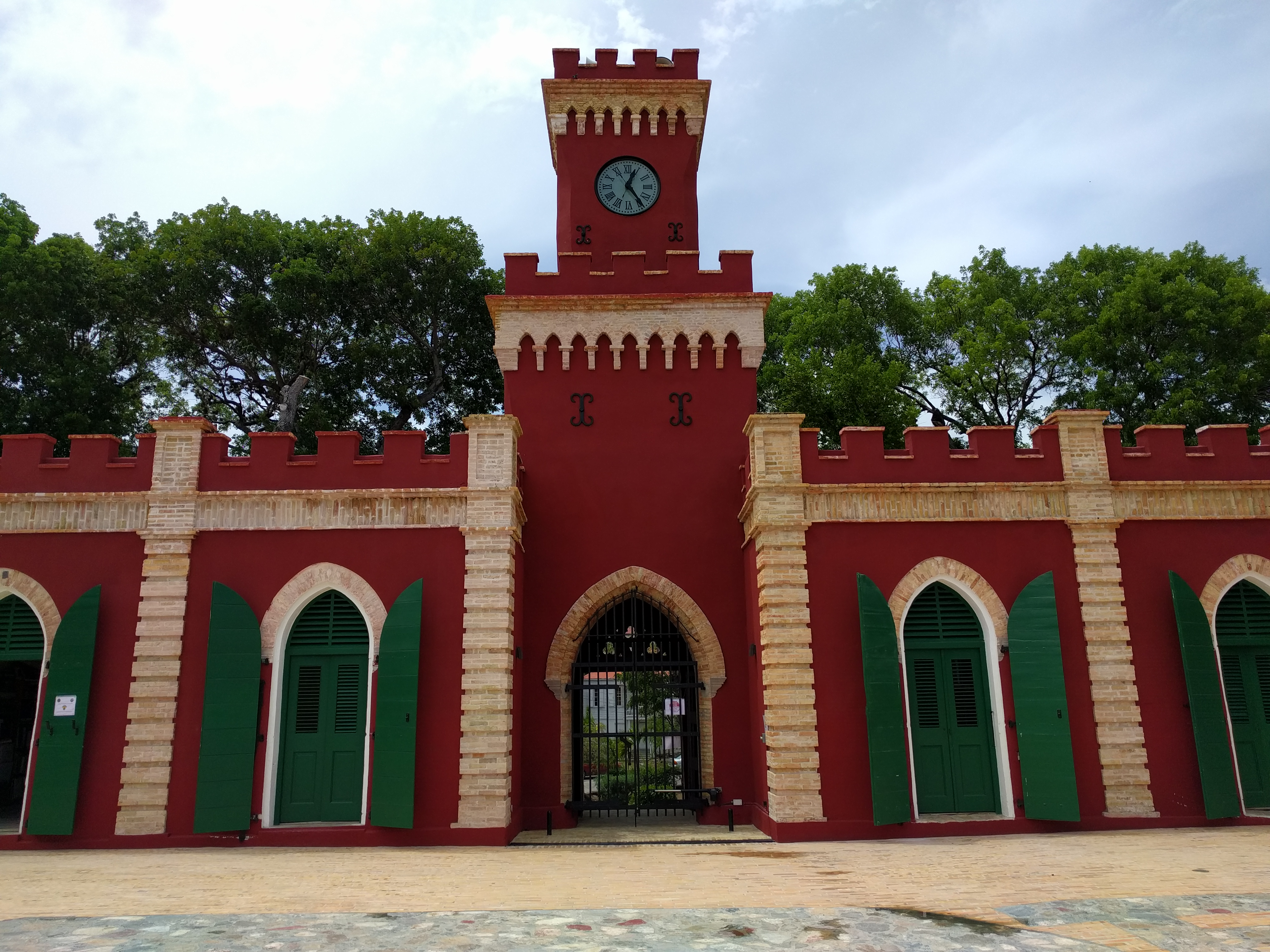
Fort Christian, May 2017

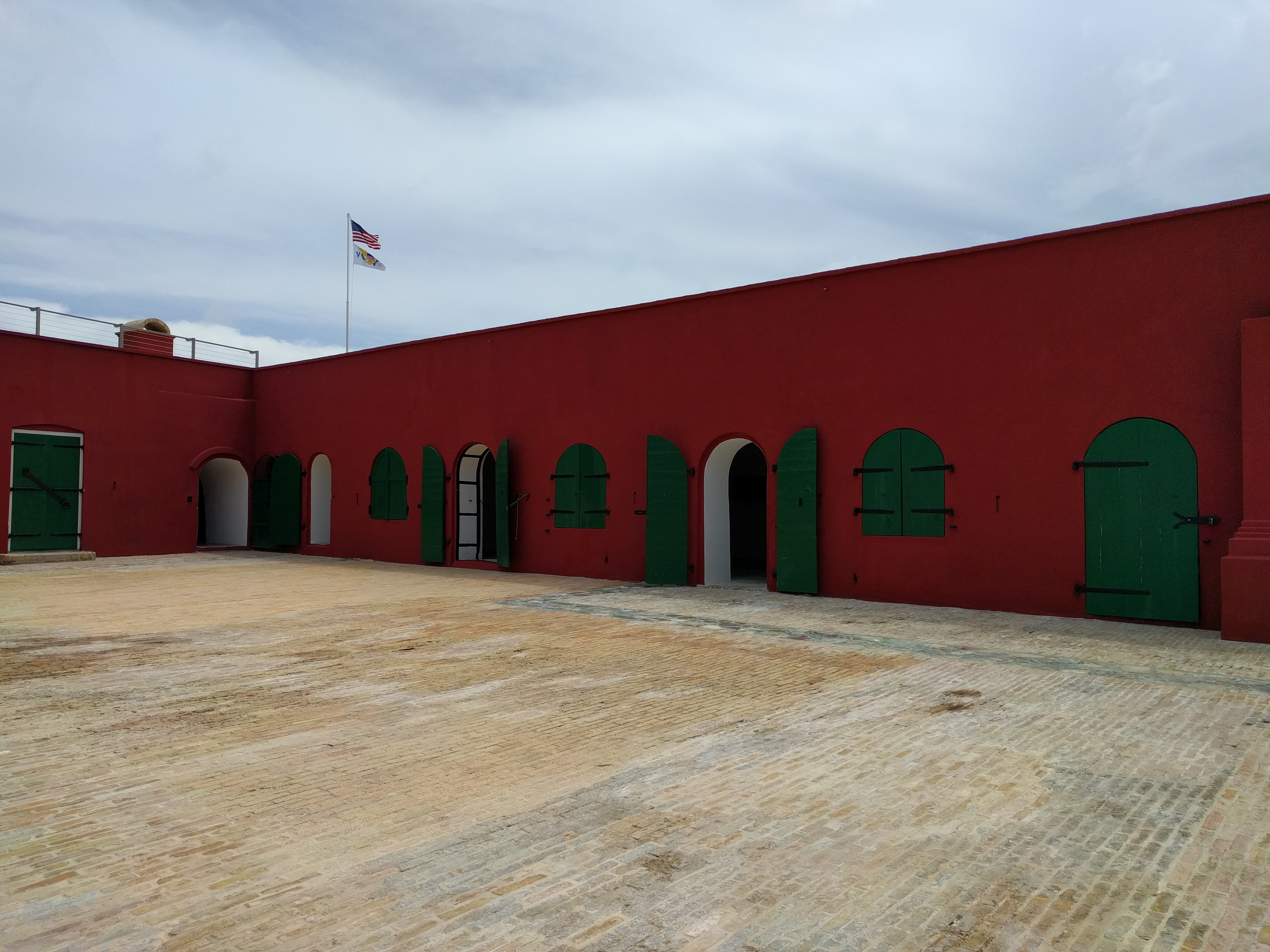
Fort Christian, May 2017

== See also ==
- List of United States National Historic Landmarks in United States commonwealths and territories, associated states, and foreign states
- National Register of Historic Places listings in the United States Virgin Islands
