= Virgin Islands at the 2024 World Aquatics Championships =

- Flag of Virgin Islands
- FINA code: ISV
- National federation: Virgin Islands Swimming Federation

in Doha, Qatar
- Competitors: 2 in 1 sport
- Medals: Gold 0 Silver 0 Bronze 0 Total 0

World Aquatics Championships appearances
- 1973; 1975; 1978; 1982; 1986; 1991; 1994; 1998; 2001; 2003; 2005; 2007; 2009; 2011; 2013; 2015; 2017; 2019; 2022; 2023; 2024

The Virgin Islands competed at the 2024 World Aquatics Championships in Doha, Qatar from 2 to 18 February.

== Competitors ==
The following is the list of competitors in the Championships.

Sport	Men	Women	Total
Swimming	1	1	2
Total	1	1	2

== Swimming ==
Virgin Islands entered 2 swimmers.

Men

Athlete	Event	Heat		Semifinal		Final	
Athlete	Event	Time	Rank	Time	Rank	Time	Rank
Kaeden Gleason	200 metre freestyle	1:59.66	63	Did not advance			
Kaeden Gleason	400 metre freestyle	4:17.52	54	—		Did not advance	

Women

Athlete	Event	Heat		Semifinal		Final	
Athlete	Event	Time	Rank	Time	Rank	Time	Rank
Riley Miller	100 metre freestyle	1:01.08	49	Did not advance			
Riley Miller	100 metre backstroke	1:09.47	50	Did not advance			
