= Jodie Lawaetz =

US Virgin Islands swimmer (born 1965)

Personal information
- Born: September 3, 1965 (age 60)

Sport
- Sport: Swimming

Jodie Lawaetz (born September 3, 1965) is a swimmer who represented the United States Virgin Islands. She competed in two events at the 1984 Summer Olympics. She was the flag bearer for the United States Virgin Islands in the opening ceremony.
