= Marinos Khristopoulos =

Greek bobsledder

Personal information
- Nationality: Greek
- Born: 22 November 1965 (age 59)

Sport
- Sport: Bobsleigh

Marinos Khristopoulos (Greek: Μαρίνος Χριστόπουλος, born 22 November 1965) is a Greek bobsledder. He competed in the two man event at the 1994 Winter Olympics.
