= Charlotte Amalie Historic District =

- U.S. National Register of Historic Places
- U.S. Historic district
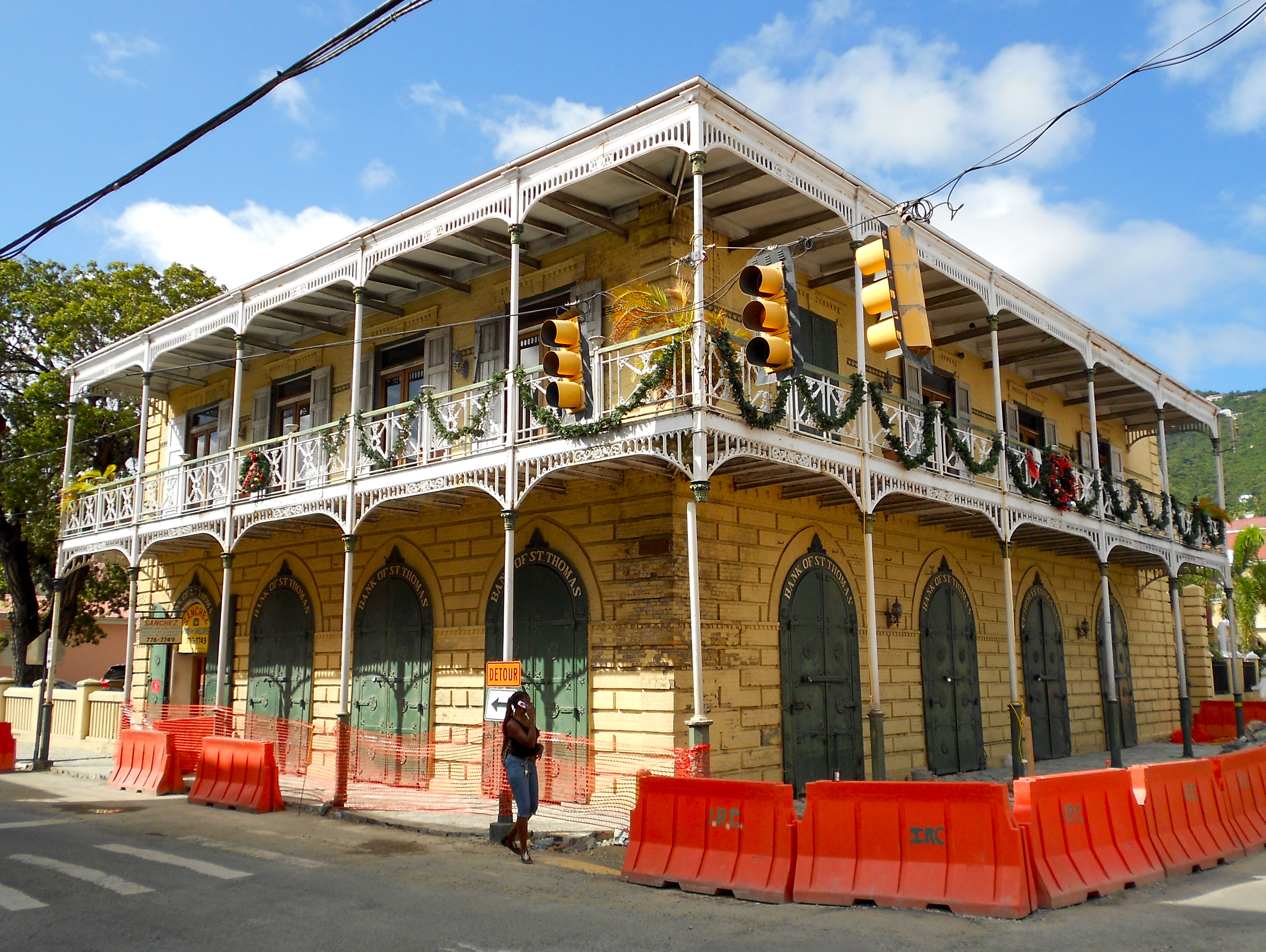

- Location within the U.S. Virgin Islands
- Location: Roughly bounded by Nytvaer, Berg and Government Hills, Bjebre Gade and St. Thomas Harbor, Charlotte Amalie, Virgin Islands
- Coordinates: 18.345°N 64.931944°W
- Area: 165.3 acres (0.669 km^{2})
- Architectural style: Greek Revival
- NRHP reference No.: 76001860 (original); 100009346 (increase)

Significant dates
- Added to NRHP: July 19, 1976
- Boundary increase: July 3, 2024

The Charlotte Amalie Historic District in Charlotte Amalie in Saint Thomas, U.S. Virgin Islands is a 165.3 acres (0.669 km^{2}) historic district which was listed on the National Register of Historic Places in 1976.

The district then included 574 contributing buildings, three contributing structures, and a contributing object. It included the entire Charlotte Amalie National Historic Site (also known as St. Thomas National Historic Site, which was a National Historic Site from December 24, 1960, until February 5, 1975, when it was disbanded and transferred to Virgin Islands, to be administered as a territorial park). It also included the entire local Charlotte Amalie Historic and Architectural Control District.

European construction in the district began with the building of Fort Christian in c.1666; the town of Charlotte Amalie was platted in 1681.

Notable properties include:

- Fort Christian (c.1666-1680), modified in 1874
- Legislative Building (1874), built as barracks for the Danish police force, in 1976 this was home for the Virgin Islands Senate.
- Emancipation Garden, honoring 1848 emancipation of slaves

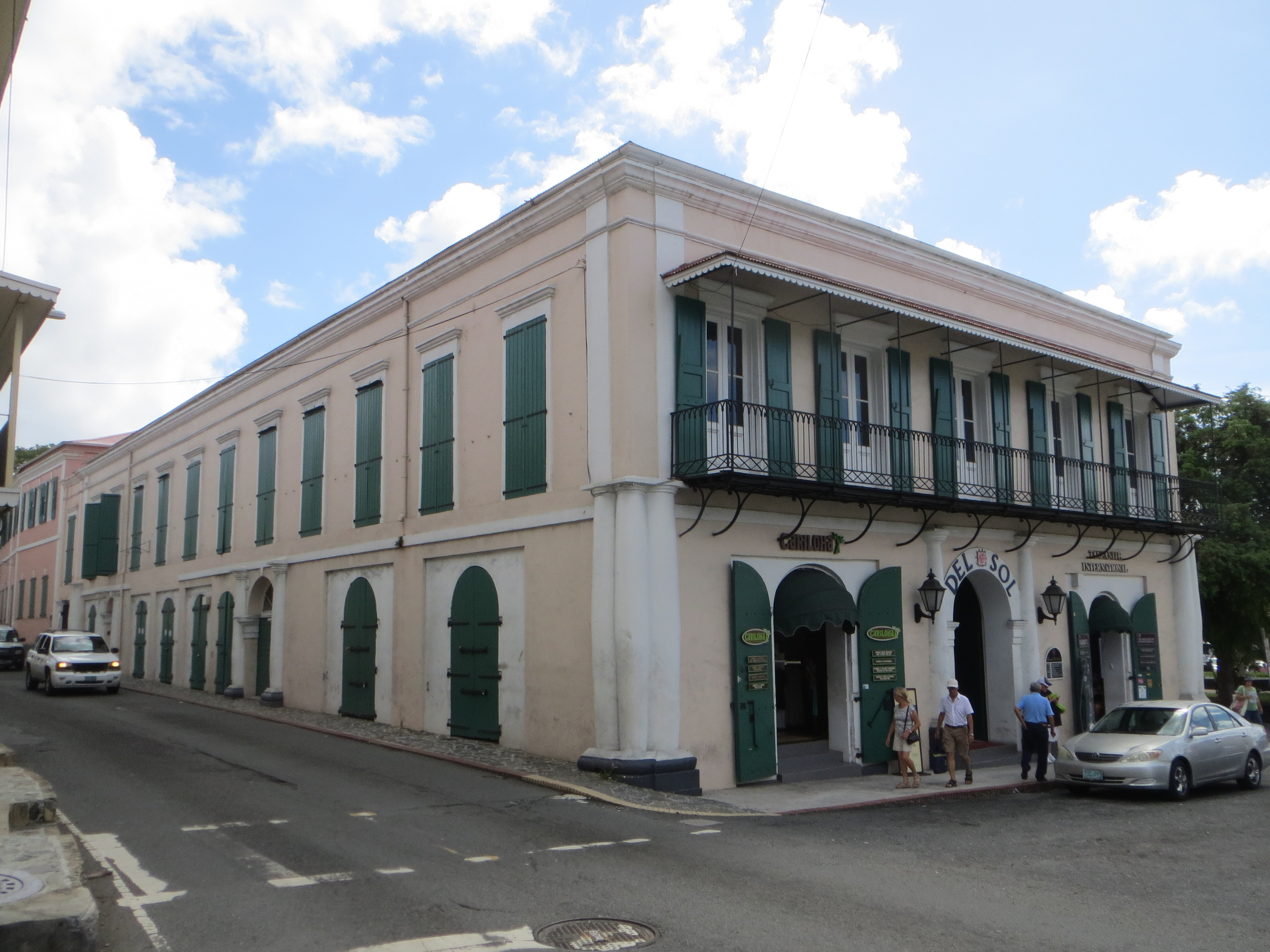
Former Grand Hotel

- Commercial Hotel and Coffee House (1839–40), also formerly known as the Grand Hotel, 44 Norre Gade. Greek Revival with an arcaded first floor.
- 13 Wimmelskafts (c.1837), a structure that housed enslaved Africans and later servants for several wealthy families including the Von Bretton family.
