= Rob Geurts =

Dutch bobsledder (born 1959)

Personal information
- Nationality: Dutch
- Born: 23 June 1959 (age 65); Utrecht, Netherlands

Sport
- Sport: Bobsleigh

Rob Geurts (born 23 June 1959) is a Dutch bobsledder. He competed in the two man event at the 1994 Winter Olympics.

As of 2010, he was a gym owner in Nieuwegein. He attended the 2010 Winter Olympics as a coach with both the Japanese and Dutch national bobsled teams.
