= Jasmine Campbell =

Virgin Islander alpine skier (born 1991)

Personal information
- Born: 1991 (age 34–35) Saint John, Virgin Islands

Sport
- Country: United States Virgin Islands
- Sport: Alpine skiing

Jasmine Campbell (born 1991 in Saint John) is an alpine skier from the Virgin Islands. She competed in the Virgin Islands at the 2014 Winter Olympics in the slalom and giant slalom. When Campbell was nine she moved from the Virgin Islands to her current place of residence Hailey, Idaho. Her father John also competed for the islands in alpine skiing at the 1992 Winter Olympics in Albertville, France and her mother Jennifer Lyons would have participated in the 1992 Olympic Games, but she renounced a short time after her pregnancy with Jasmine. She was the flag bearer for the U.S. Virgin Islands in the 2014 Winter Olympics

== See also ==
- Virgin Islands at the 2014 Winter Olympics
