= Faauuga Muagututia =

American Samoan bobsledder (born 1958)

Personal information
- National team: American Samoa
- Born: May 13, 1958 (age 67) Pago Pago, American Samoa
- Education: Carson (CA) High School
- Occupation: United States Navy SEAL

Sport
- Sport: Bobsleigh

Achievements and titles
- Olympic finals: 39th
- Updated on 11 June 2016

Faauuga Tia Muagututia (born May 13, 1958) is a former United States Navy SEAL and Winter Olympic competitor for American Samoa in the bobsleigh.

== Personal life ==
Muagututia was born on May 13, 1958, in Pago Pago, American Samoa. He moved to Los Angeles aged 14 and attended Carson High School in California. Muagututia and his wife Kathy have three sons: Grant, Garrett Muagututia, and Myles.

== Navy ==
He became a Navy SEAL in 1979 and by 1994 was a senior chief boatswain mate.

== Bobsleigh ==
Muagututia was approached by the American founder of the American Samoa Bobsled Federation because of his background as a Navy SEAL. His first experience in a bobsleigh was at a driving school in Calgary, Alberta, Canada in November 1992. He earned qualification for the 1994 Winter Olympics, held in Lillehammer Norway, by scoring 38 points across two international competitions held in Calgary, to earn above the minimum standard of 20 points, and by taking part in five international competitions. His results included a tenth-place finish in an Americas Cup Division race.

He was selected to represent American Samoa at the 1994 Winter Olympics as part of a two-man bobsleigh team alongside brakeman Brad Kiltz. This was the first time American Samoa had sent athletes to a Winter Olympic Games. The pair were managed by William "Buddy" Hoblak. In the first run Muagututia and Kiltz placed 41st out of the 43 sleds in a time of 55.57 seconds. On the second run they were again 41st in a faster time of 55.25 seconds. They improved to 37th position on run three with a time of 55.06 seconds. On the fourth and final run they finished 38th in a time of 55.16 seconds. Overall they finished 39th with a combined time of 3 minutes 31.04 seconds.
