= Katie Tannenbaum =

American skeleton racer (born 1985)

Personal information
- Nationality: American
- Born: 13 May 1985 (age 40) California
- Height: 164 cm (5 ft 5 in)
- Weight: 65 kg (143 lb)

Sport
- Country: (United States Virgin Islands) U.S. Virgin Island
- Sport: Skeleton
- Coached by: Martin Rettl

Katie Tannenbaum (born 13 May 1985) is an American skeleton racer. Originally from California, she competes on the Skeleton World Cup circuit for the United States Virgin Islands. She started in the sport in 2010 and began competing on the World Cup level in 2011. She rides a Bromley sled. In her day job, Tannenbaum is a mathematics instructor at the University of the Virgin Islands.

Tannenbaum did not score highly enough in the 2017–18 season to earn the Virgin Islands a quota spot for the 2018 Winter Olympics, although athletes ranking below her did earn quota positions via (non-ranking-based) continental allocations. The Virgin Islands Olympic Committee filed an arbitration case before the Ad-hoc Division of the Court of Arbitration for Sport challenging the quota system on the grounds of the principle of universal representation and historic practice in the Olympics of issuing additional quota spots to small nations through a "tripartite commission", involving the organizers, the IOC, and individual sport governing bodies — which was not done for the Winter Olympics. The CAS panel acknowledged the principle of universality but went on to state that "this principle does not give every country the right to participate", nor was there any legal requirement for such a commission to be established. The appeal was dismissed, and Tannenbaum was not allowed to compete in Pyeongchang.

Tannenbaum made her Olympic debut in 2022 in Beijing, earning a spot after both Sweden and France declined to send athletes for the event. She was nearly forced to withdraw after testing positive for COVID-19 just before the opening ceremonies but was released from isolation before the final training runs. Tannenbaum finished last of the 25 qualified athletes in the event. She was the only athlete representing the Virgin Islands present at the 2022 games.
