= Brad Kiltz =

American Samoan bobsledder

William Bradley Kiltz (born September 2, 1957) is a former bobsleigh brakeman who competed for American Samoa at the 1994 Winter Olympics held in Lillehammer, Norway.

He was selected to represent American Samoa at the 1994 Winter Olympics (since the American territory has the same nationality as the United States) as part of a two-man bobsleigh team alongside pilot Faauuga Muagututia. This was the first time American Samoa had sent athletes to a Winter Olympic Games. The pair were managed by William "Buddy" Hoblak. In the first run Muagututia and Kiltz placed 41st out of the 43 sleds in a time of 55.57 seconds. On the second run they were again 41st in a faster time of 55.25 seconds. They improved to 37th position on run three with a time of 55.06 seconds. On the fourth and final run they finished 38th in a time of 55.16 seconds. Overall they finished 39th with a combined time of 3 minutes 31.04 seconds.
