= American Samoa at the 1994 Winter Olympics =

- IOC code: ASA
- NOC: American Samoa National Olympic Committee

in Lillehammer
- Competitors: 2 (men) in 1 sport
- Medals: Gold 0 Silver 0 Bronze 0 Total 0

Winter Olympics appearances (overview)
- 1994; 1998–2018; 2022; 2026

American Samoa sent a delegation to compete at the 1994 Winter Olympics in Lillehammer, Norway from February 12–27, 1994. This was the territory's first, and until the 2022 Winter Olympics, only Winter Olympics they have competed in. The delegation consisted of two athletes, Faauuga Muagututia and Brad Kiltz, who competed in the two-man bobsleigh event where they finished 39th.

== Background ==
The American Samoa National Olympic Committee was recognized by the International Olympic Committee on January 1, 1987, and the territory made its Olympic debut the next year at the 1988 Seoul Olympics in South Korea. They have competed in every Summer Olympics since, but have only participated in the Winter Olympic Games this once, in 1994 in Lillehammer, as well as in 2022 in Beijing. For the 1994 Winter Olympics, the territory's delegation consisted of one two-man bobsleigh team. Faauuga Muagututia was chosen as the flag bearer for the opening ceremony.

== Competitors ==
The following is the list of number of competitors in the Games.

Sport	Men	Women	Total
Bobsleigh	2	–	2
Total	2	0	2

== Bobsleigh ==
Brad Kiltz, who was 36 years old at the time of the Games, is a native of Evansville, Indiana, able to compete for American Samoa because the American territory has the same nationality as the United States. Faauuga Muagututia, who was 35 years old at the time of the Games, is a native of American Samoa. Muagututia, as the driver, was the only one required to be from American Samoa. At the time of the Games, Muagututia was serving in the United States Navy as a SEAL, while Kiltz was working as a carpenter.

The two-man bobsleigh event was held in four runs over two days, on February 19–20, 1994. Final standings were based on the sum of all four runs for each team. On the 19th, in runs 1 and 2, they posted a time of 55.57 seconds and 55.25 seconds, respectively. At the end of the first day, they were ranked 42nd out of 43 sleds. On the second day, they posted run times of 55.06 and 55.16 seconds. Their faster times on the second day allowed them to finish with a time of 3 minutes and 41.04 seconds, which placed them 39th out of 42 sleds which completed all four runs.

Sled	Athletes	Event	Run 1		Run 2		Run 3		Run 4		Total	
Sled	Athletes	Event	Time	Rank	Time	Rank	Time	Rank	Time	Rank	Time	Rank
ASA-1	Faauuga Muagututia; Brad Kiltz	Two-man	55.57	42	55.25	41	55.06	36	55.16	38	3:41.04	39

== See also ==
- American Samoa at the Olympics
