= Jeff Kromenhoek =

United States Virgin Islands bobsledder

Personal information
- Nationality: American Virgin Islander
- Born: March 14, 1976 (age 49)

Sport
- Sport: Bobsleigh

Jeff Kromenhoek (born March 14, 1976) is a bobsledder who represented the United States Virgin Islands. He competed in the two man and the four man events at the 1998 Winter Olympics.
