= Kyle Heikkila =

American luger (born 1971)

Personal information
- Born: 12 December 1971 (age 54) United States Virgin Islands

Sport
- Country: United States Virgin Islands
- Sport: Luge

Kyle Heikkila (born 12 December 1971) is a United States Virgin Islands retired luger who competed at the 1992 and 1994 Winter Olympics, finishing in 29th and 23rd, respectively. He carried his country's flag during the opening ceremony of the 1994 Games in Lillehammer. Before the competition, Heikkila said of the Lillehammer Olympic Bobsleigh and Luge Track: "It's a really nice track. It's easy to get down, but it's difficult to get down quickly. I prefer luge tracks; this is not really a luge track." Following his men's singles competition, the University of Antilles student said: "I'm really glad luge is one of the first competitions. You get it over with and relax," adding that he was looking forward to shopping, sightseeing and partying.

== See also ==
- List of flag bearers for the Virgin Islands at the Olympics
