= John Campbell (skier) =

Virgin Islander alpine skier (born 1962)

Personal information
- Born: November 2, 1962 (age 63) Saint John, Virgin Islands

John Campbell (born November 2, 1962) is an alpine skier from Saint John who competed in the 1992 Winter Olympics who participated in the slalom, the giant slalom, and the super giant slalom. He has a daughter, Jasmine Campbell who competed in the 2014 Olympics in the slalom and giant slalom, with her father as coach. She was the flag bearer for the U.S. Virgin Islands

== Results ==
1992 Winter Olympics
Event	Race 1	Race 2	Total	
Event	Time	Time	Time	Rank
Super-G			1:26.83	74
Giant Slalom	1:20.68	1:19.35	2:40.03	62
Slalom	DNF	–	DNF	–
