= 13 Wimmelskafts Slave House =

National historic landmark

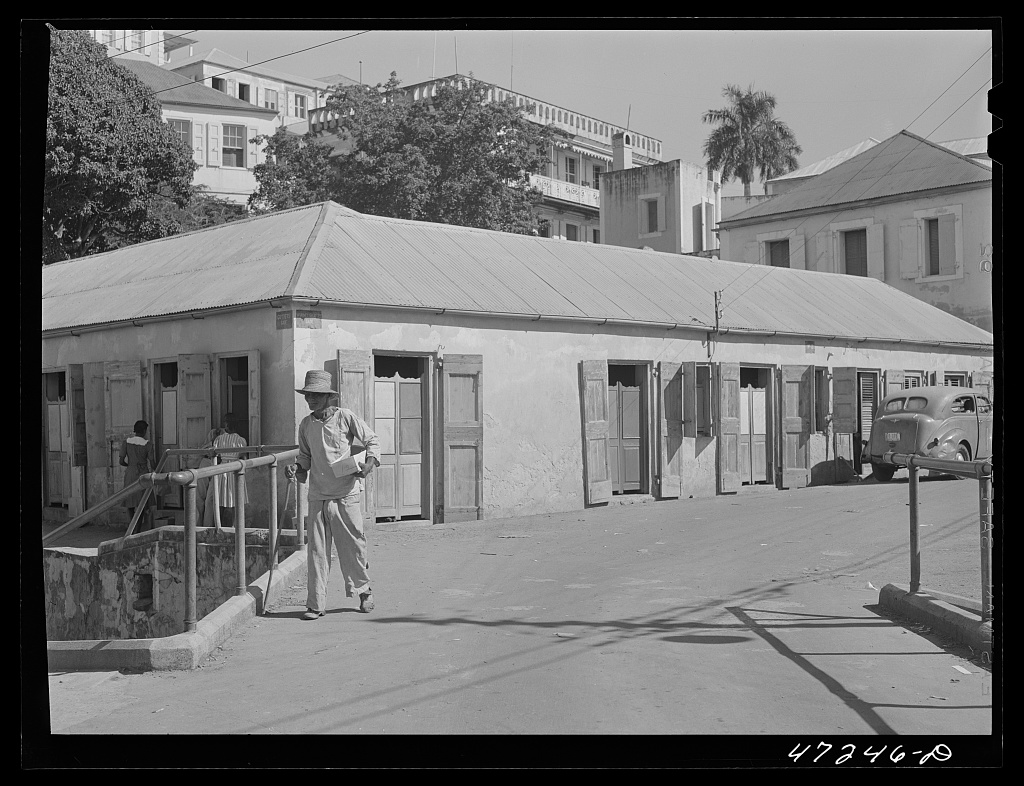
Former Home of Enslaved People at 13 Wimmelskafts in Charlotte Amalie

13 Wimmelskafts Slave House is a former slave quarters located in Charlotte Amalie, the capital of The United States Virgin Islands. The town was established by The Danish West Indian Company in 1671 with the approval of King Christian V of Denmark. Today the town of Charlotte Amalie is a national historic landmark.

Charlotte Amalie was a port from the late 1600s and well into the 1800s. One local merchant, Lucas Von Bretton, lived in the largest estate located in Charlotte Amalie, known presently as the Enid Baa Library and Archive. Part of his estate included slave quarters located in the back of the main house. Today those slave quarters are known as 13 Wimmelskafts and are no longer part of the larger estate.

During its use as a slave house, the single-story building accommodated between 10-15 residents. The building's U-shaped footprint allowed each of the occupants to have their own room with their own door to the street and inner courtyard. The courtyard includes a double-oven which was used to prepare food for the large number of residents. At the back of the building is a saltwater well that the inhabitants used for bathing and washing.

After being largely abandoned for decades, 13 Wimmelskafts was restored in 2023 with assistance from a grant from the Virgin Islands State Historic Preservation Office. The restoration included repointing the rubble masonry walls and brick ovens.

Today the building houses 3 Queens Distillery and a museum. The museum includes many artifacts from St. Thomas, Denmark and Caribbean history. The collection includes writings from former resident and Impressionist painter Camille Pissaro, Danish Kings and Taino artifacts.
