= Dinah Browne =

American luger

Personal information
- Nationality: American
- Born: November 27, 1969 (age 56) Christiansted, United States Virgin Islands

Sport
- Sport: Luge

Dinah Browne (born November 27, 1969) is a luger from the United States Virgin Islands. She competed in the women's singles event at the 2002 Winter Olympics.
