= Transfer Day =

Public holiday in the U.S. Virgin Islands

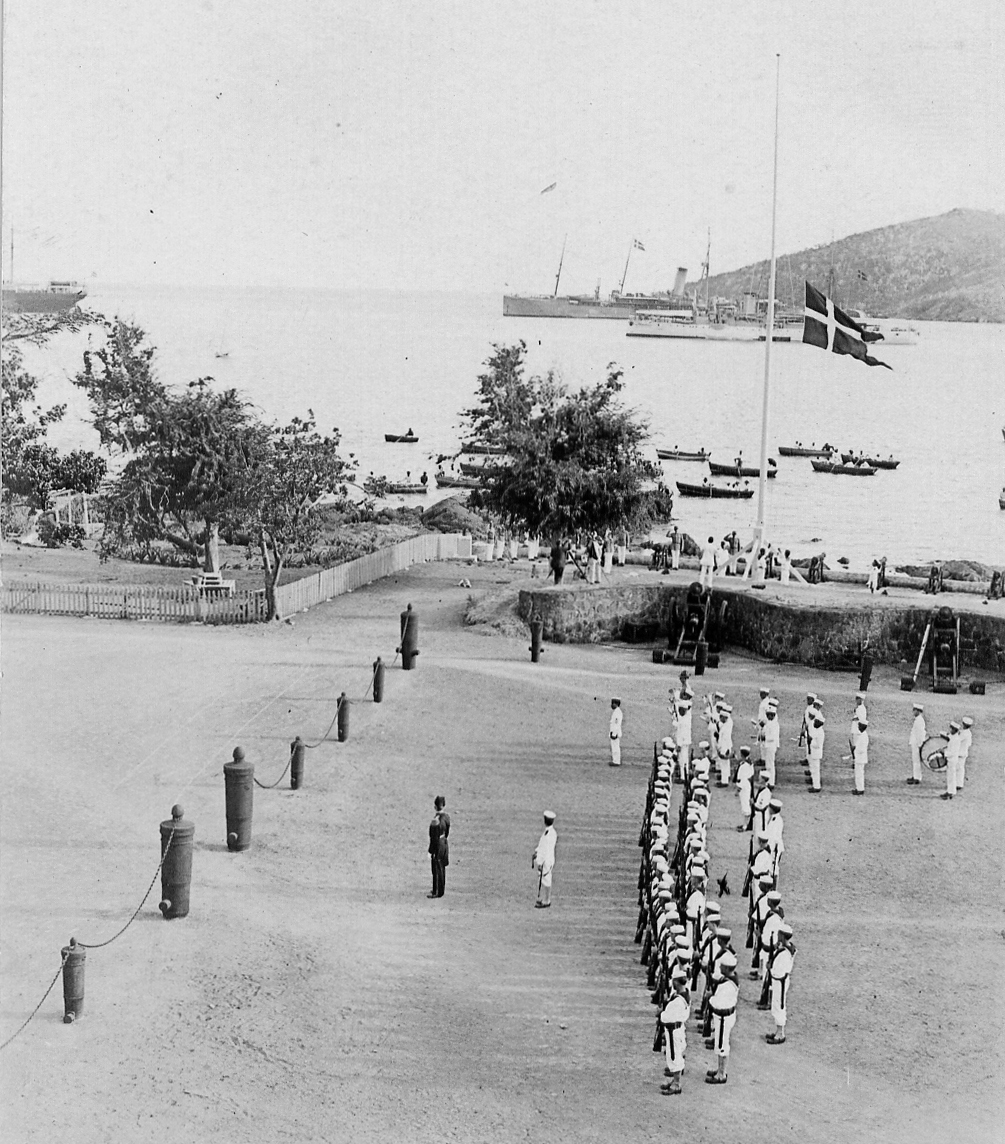
Dannebrog being lowered at the Governor's Mansion for the last time (31 March 1917)

Transfer Day is a holiday celebrated in the U.S. Virgin Islands on March 31. It marks the transfer of the islands from Denmark to the United States that took place in 1917. The islands were initially held by various European countries, and were under the sole control of Denmark by 1754. Transfer Day could have taken place years earlier, but due to the construction and funding of the Panama Canal, the United States Senate rejected negotiations. Following war-induced money shortages and the potential German invasion of Denmark, both sides found the exchange mutually beneficial and ratified the Treaty of the Danish West Indies. Transfer Day is now celebrated on the islands in various ways, including parades, parties, and reenactments of the original Transfer Day.

== Danish control ==
The first Westerner to land in the Virgin Islands was Christopher Columbus in 1493. Several European countries subsequently held the Virgin Islands, including France, Britain, Spain and lastly Denmark.

After gaining full control of the islands via a 1754 purchase from the Danish West Indian Company, the Danish established the local sugar industry, which relied upon slave labour. When the sugar industry became less profitable, the Danish West Indies continued throughout the 19th century to enjoy a commercial boom as a free port and as a coaling station for sailing vessels and paddle steamers.

At the time of the US purchase of the Danish West Indies in 1917, the colony did not include Water Island, which had been sold by Denmark to the East Asiatic Company, a private shipping company, in 1905. The company sold the island to the United States in 1944, during the German occupation of Denmark. The federal government then used the island for military purposes until 1950, before finally transferring it to the territorial government in 1996.

== Transfer Day ==
The Virgin Islands were of long interest of the United States, "…but as far back as the Civil War the U.S. was aware of their value as a possible U.S. Naval depot, commanding as they do the most important sea approaches from the Atlantic to the Caribbean". Following the decline of the sugar industry, the Danish began to have interest in selling the islands, but the United States senate was disinterested in the deal because of the building of the Panama Canal which significantly affect global trade and specifically United States Trade. Years later, there was mutual interest due to the fact that Denmark was struggling financially from war with Prussia and Austria, the United States had interest because Denmark was under threat of German invasion which caused fear that the Germans would then inhabit the Virgin Islands. In January 1917, the United States would agree to purchase the Virgin Islands for "$25 million ($295 per acre), then regarded as an exorbitant sum for land that amounted to hardly more than a tenth of the size of Rhode Island, the smallest state" as well as a recognition of Danish sovereignty over the whole island of Greenland. The first Transfer Day celebration/ceremony occurred on March 31, 1917.

The news was immediately telegraphed to New York, then cabled to San Juan, Puerto Rico, flashed by wireless to the cruiser Hancock in the harbor at Charlotte Amalie, and carried ashore to St. Thomas via rowboat. There, Danish and American honor guards in white uniforms stood in formation on opposite sides of the parade ground before red-walled Fort Christian. Once the message had been delivered, at 4:48 p.m, the Danish honor guard presented arms, the Danish national anthem was played, and a cannon boomed 21 times as the red and white Danish flag was slowly lowered for the final time after 251 years of Danish rule. At 4:53 p.m. the American honor guard presented arms, a band played the "Star-Spangled Banner," and to the roar of the cannon the American flag was raised. As a last gesture, Admiral Henri Konow of Denmark and Admiral Edwin T. Pollock of the United States Navy drew their ceremonial swords.

The Virgin Islands now have annual celebrations in honor of transfer day. According to a St. Croix website, "Transfer Day is commemorated annually with a military parade and various ceremonies and cultural events across all of the islands". The celebration varies by year, for example in 1987, "A reenactment of the transfer will begin at 4 p.m. Tuesday on the lawns of the 1874 lime-green, white-shuttered Legislature building. That's the precise time the event originally occurred on March 31, 1917". In addition to reenacting the transfer, the Danish also replicated their departure, "The 196-foot-long, three-masted, full-rigged Danish government training ship Danmark has sailed here from Copenhagen especially for the celebration. The Danmark's 80 cadets and 18 officers will represent the officers and crew of the Danish cruiser Valkyrien which in 1917 carried back to Denmark the last Danish governor and his official party".

== Key actors ==
Constantin Brun, a Danish royal administrator and merchant, was in Washington, D.C., on Transfer Day as representative of Denmark accepting payment for the Virgin Islands on behalf of President Woodrow Wilson. Following payment, various telegraphs were sent to the islands in order to inform them of the sale. As mentioned previously, a final act of respect would be displayed by Admiral Henri Konow of Denmark and Admiral Edwin T. Pollock of the United States Navy.

== Gallery ==
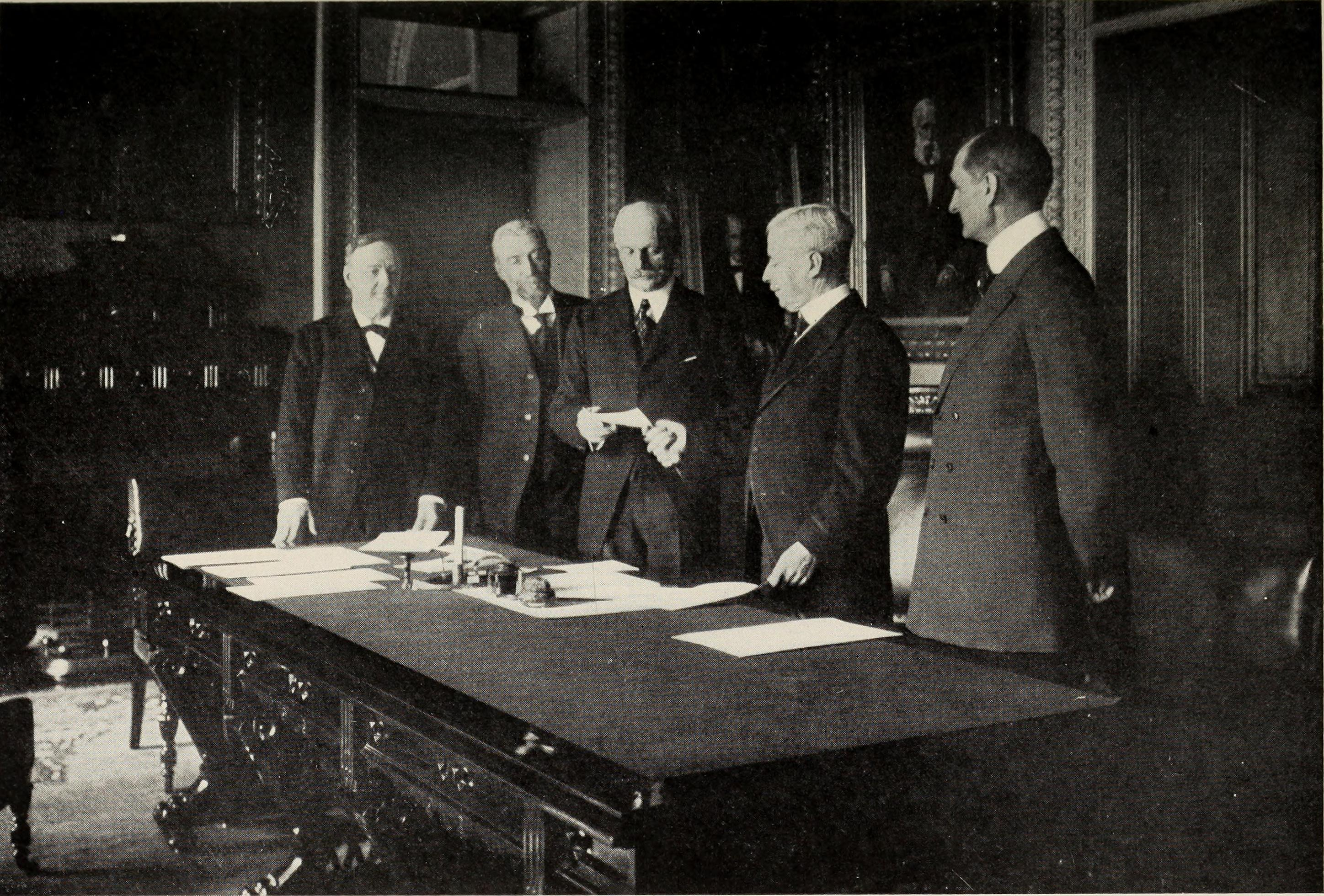
1917 money transfer after the Treaty of the Danish West Indies

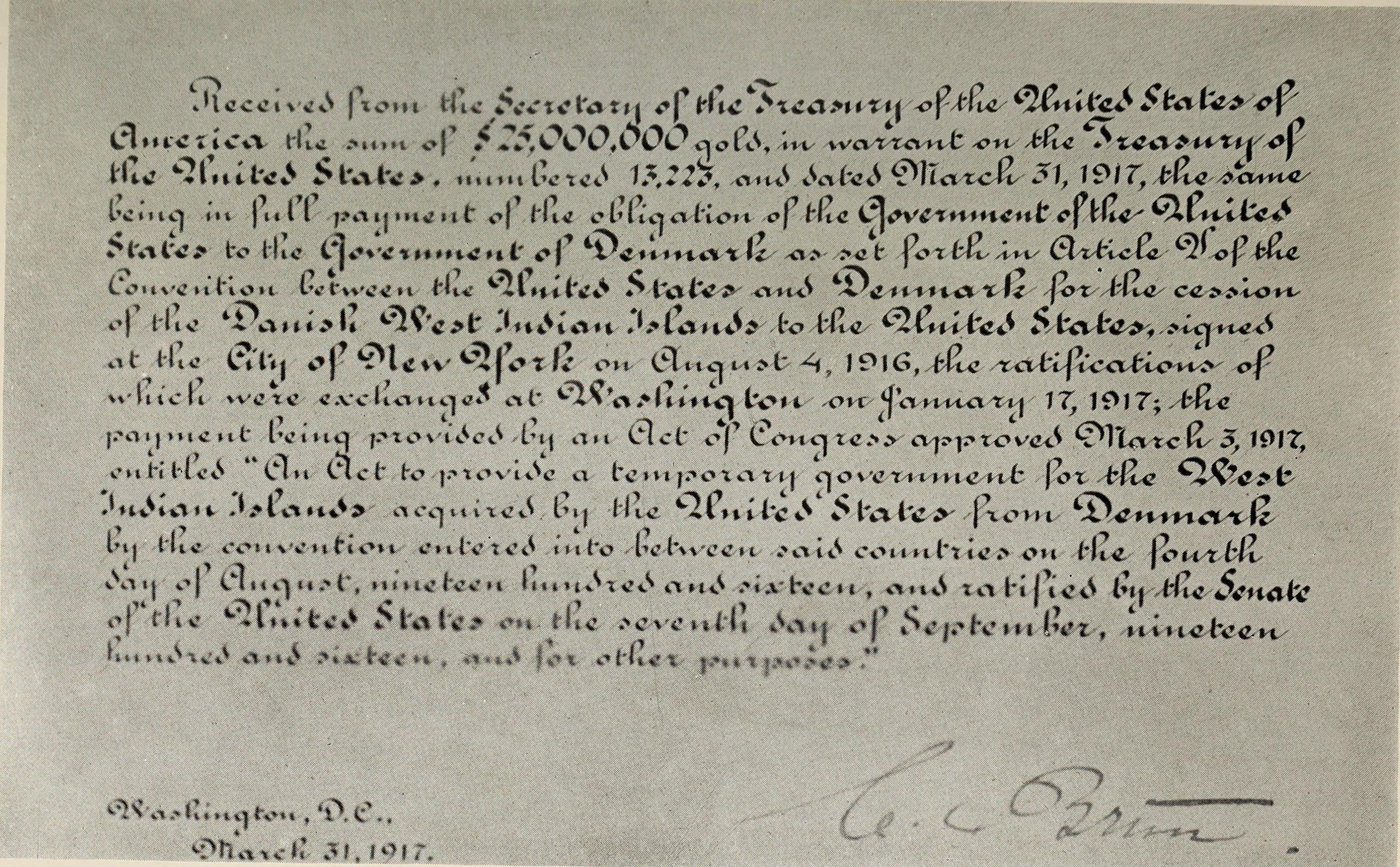
$25,000,000 receipt for the Treaty of the Danish West Indies
