= Christian Brown =

American bobsledder (born 1967)

Personal information
- Nationality: American Virgin Islander
- Born: July 27, 1967 (age 57)

Sport
- Sport: Bobsleigh

Christian Brown (born July 27, 1967) is a bobsledder who represented the United States Virgin Islands. He competed at the 1998 Winter Olympics, finishing at 29th and the 2002 Winter Olympics.
