= Todd Schultz =

United States Virgin Islands bobsledder

Personal information
- Nationality: American Virgin Islander
- Born: July 3, 1971 (age 53)

Sport
- Sport: Bobsleigh

Todd Schultz (born July 3, 1971) is a bobsledder who represented the United States Virgin Islands. He competed at the 1994 Winter Olympics and the 1998 Winter Olympics.
