= Natalia Kuipers =

Virgin Islander swimmer (born 2002)

Personal information
- Full name: Natalia Jean Kuipers
- National team: United States Virgin Islands
- Born: June 13, 2002 (age 24) Saint Croix, U.S. Virgin Islands

Sport
- Sport: Swimming
- College team: Bryant University

Natalia Jean Kuipers (born June 13, 2002) is a swimmer for the U.S. Virgin Islands. She competed in the women's 400 meter freestyle at 2020 Summer Olympics. She also competed at the 2018 Summer Youth Olympics in the girls' 200 meter and 400 meter freestyle events.
