= Keith Sudziarski =

United States Virgin Islands bobsledder

Personal information
- Full name: Keith Euegene Sudziarski
- Nationality: American Virgin Islander
- Born: July 20, 1973 (age 51)

Sport
- Sport: Bobsleigh

Keith Sudziarski (born July 20, 1973) is a bobsledder who represented the United States Virgin Islands. He competed at the 1994, 1998 and the 2002 Winter Olympics.
