= Zachary Zoller =

United States Virgin Islands bobsledder

Personal information
- Born: February 5, 1973 (age 52); San Francisco, California, United States

Sport
- Sport: Bobsleigh

Zachary Zoller (born February 5, 1973) is a bobsledder who represented the United States Virgin Islands. He competed at the 1994, 1998 and the 2002 Winter Olympics.
