= Paul Zar =

United States Virgin Islands bobsledder

Personal information
- Nationality: American Virgin Islander
- Born: July 2, 1967 (age 57); New York City, United States

Sport
- Sport: Bobsleigh

Paul Zar (born July 2, 1967) is a bobsledder who represented the United States Virgin Islands. He competed at the 1992, 1994, 1998 and the 2002 Winter Olympics.
