= Adriel Sanes =

US Virgin Islands swimmer (born 1998)

Personal information
- Nationality: United States Virgin Islands
- Born: October 27, 1998 (age 27) Saint Croix, United States Virgin Islands

Sport
- Sport: Swimming
- College team: Auburn Tigers; University of Denver

Adriel Sanes (born October 27, 1998) is a swimmer from the United States Virgin Islands. He competed in the 2020 Summer Olympics.
