= Anne Abernathy =

American sportswoman

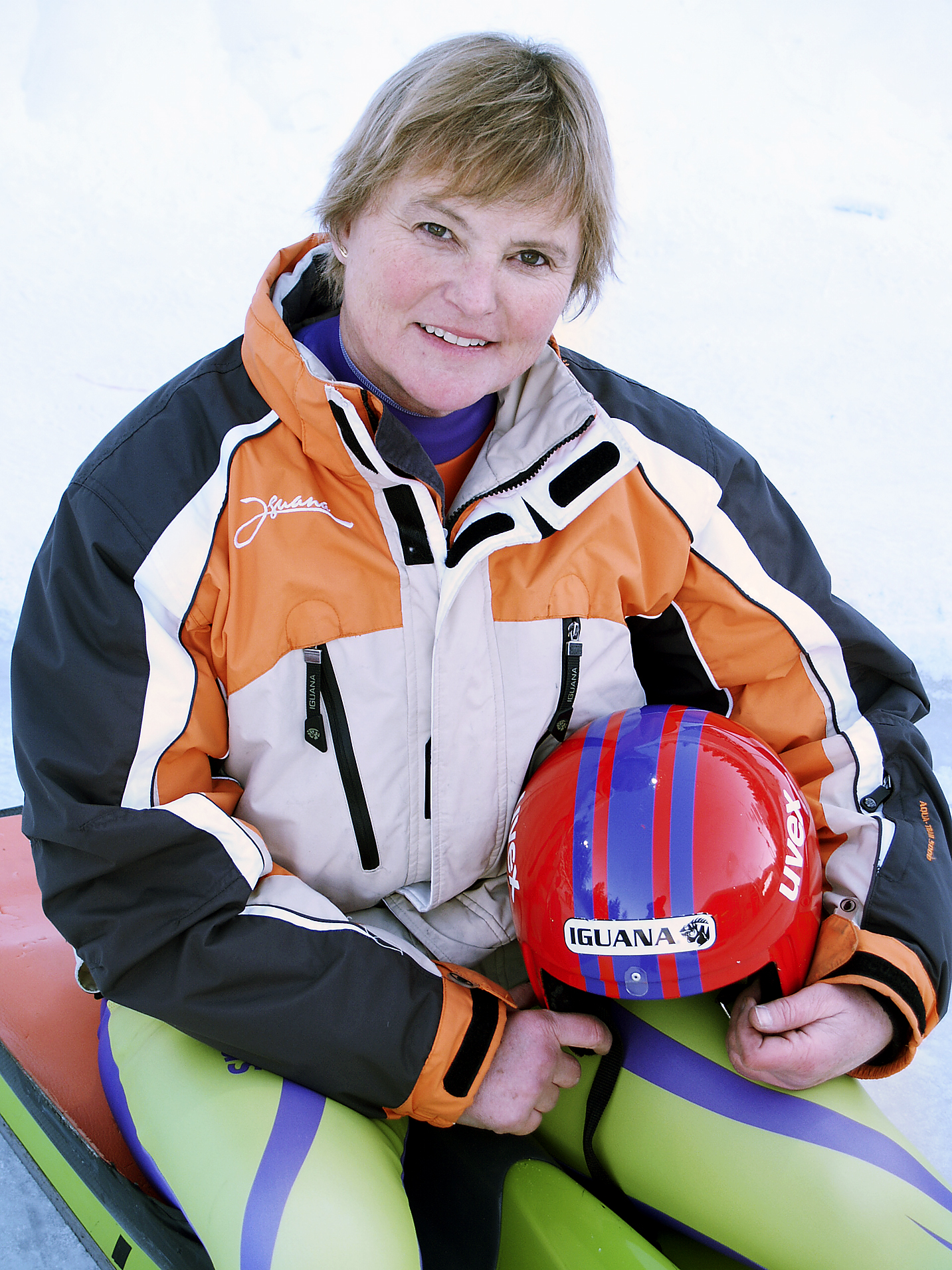
- Abernathy in 2006

Personal information
- Full name: Julianne Abernathy
- Nicknames: Grandma Luge, Grandma Archer
- Born: April 12, 1953 (age 73) Eglin Air Force Base, Florida, U.S.
- Height: 5 ft 5 in (1.65 m)
- Weight: 165 lb (75 kg)
- Website: anneabernathy.com

Sport
- Country: United States Virgin Islands
- Sport: Luge, Archery
- Updated on 1 July 2012

Julianne "Anne" Abernathy (born April 12, 1953) is a luge and archery athlete from the United States Virgin Islands and is the oldest female athlete to compete in the Winter Olympics. The 2006 Winter Olympics were her sixth. Despite her age, she is a strong competitor with numerous international podium finishes, and is consistently ranked in the top 20 world rankings. She is known within luge circles as "Grandma Luge."

== Career ==
Abernathy's top finishes include third place at the Nations Cup in Igls, Austria in January 2004, and third place at the Nations Cup in Königssee, in February 2004. She finished in the top 10 in seven of the eight events in the 2004–2005 Nations Cup series. Abernathy finished 25th in the 37th World Championships in 2004 in Nagano, Japan, but did not compete in the 2005 championships in Park City, Utah, due to injuries suffered during homologation at the Cesana Pariol track in Cesana, Italy, three weeks earlier.

Abernathy suffered a serious accident during a World Cup race in Altenberg, Germany in January 2001 that resulted in a brain injury. To recover, she used an alternative medicine treatment involving controlling rockets in a video game through electrical impulses from brain waves, a therapy designed to help her retrain her brain to compensate for the damaged areas. The therapy was successful and Abernathy was able to return to competition in time to qualify for the 2002 Winter Olympics. The story of Abernathy's crash and recovery was featured on the Discovery Health Channel series Impact: Stories of Survival (Season 1, episode 1).

During practice for the competition at the 2006 Winter Olympics, Abernathy crashed and broke her wrist and her scapula, and was forced to withdraw from competition.

At the 2002 Winter Olympics in Salt Lake City, Abernathy became the oldest woman to compete in a Winter Olympic Games. She was also the first to qualify for six Winter Olympic Games and one of only two female athletes to compete in five Winter Olympics. In 2006, she became the first woman over 50 to qualify for the Winter Olympics.

In the 1994 Winter Olympics in Lillehammer, Norway, Abernathy became the first athlete to create an online diary which was an exclusive on AOL.

Before her first Olympic appearance in 1988, Abernathy was diagnosed and treated for Non-Hodgkin lymphoma. Although the cancer returned several times during her sports career, the fact was kept hidden from the public through three Olympic appearances.
