= Virgin Islands at the 2011 World Aquatics Championships =

Sporting event delegation

Flag of United States Virgin Islands

The United States Virgin Islands competed at the 2011 World Aquatics Championships in Shanghai, China between July 16 and 31, 2011.

== Swimming ==
U.S. Virgin Islands qualified 1 swimmer.

Men

Athlete	Event	Heats		Semifinals		Final	
Athlete	Event	Time	Rank	Time	Rank	Time	Rank
Branden Whitehurst	Men's 100m Freestyle	50.95	46	did not advance			
Branden Whitehurst	Men's 200m IM	2:09.58	40	did not advance			
