= Flag of the United States Virgin Islands =

U.S. territory flag

United States Virgin Islands
- Use: Civil and state flag
- Proportion: 2:3
- Adopted: May 17, 1921; 105 years ago
- Design: A simplified version of the coat of arms of the United States between the letters V and I (for Virgin Islands). The yellow-colored eagle holds a sprig of laurel in one talon, and three arrows in the other. The blue color in the shield on the eagle's breast is the same color as that of the flag and shield of the United States.
- Designed by: Percival Wilson Sparks

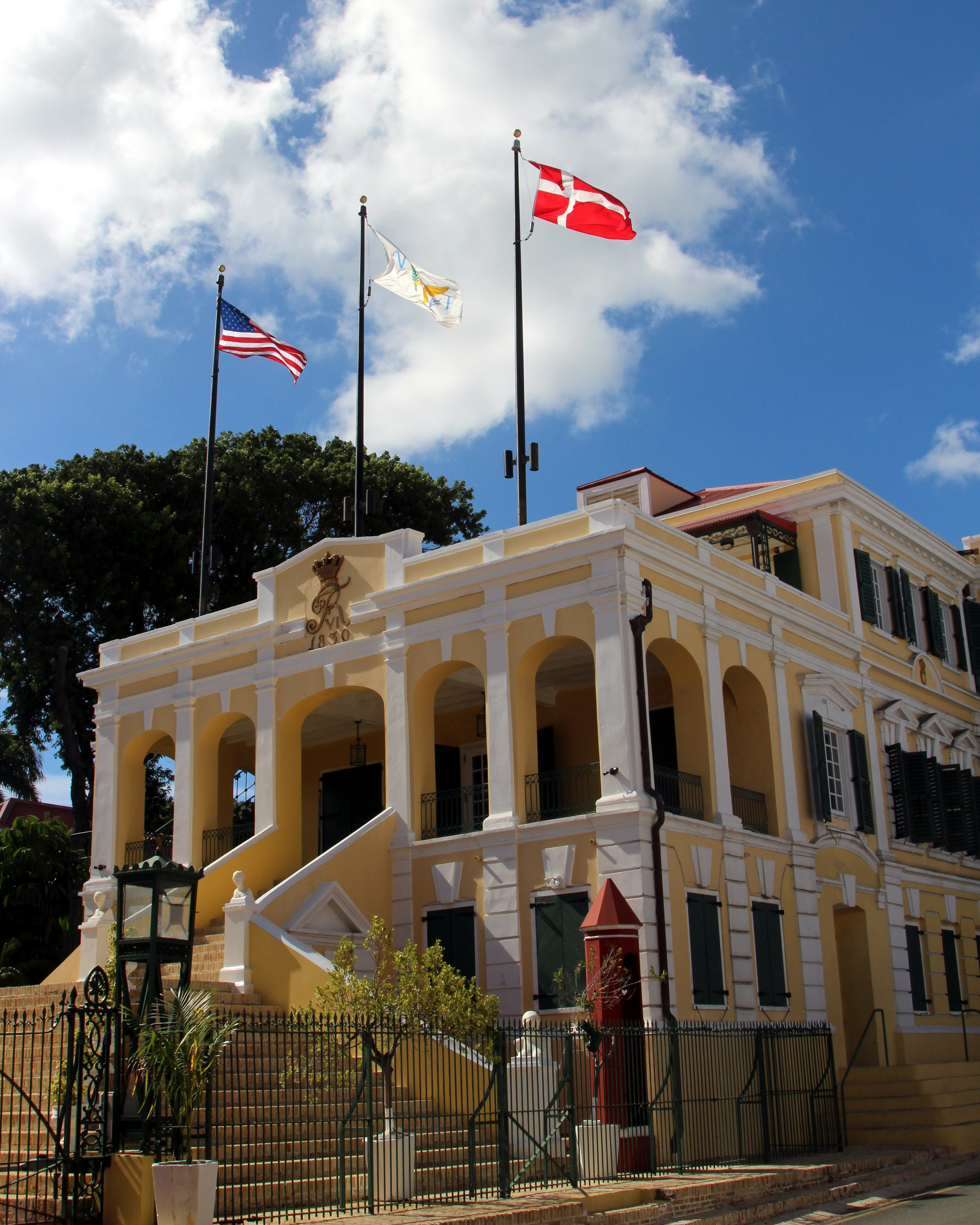
The U.S. Virgin Islands Governor's Mansion flies the American, USVI and Danish flags.

The flag of the United States Virgin Islands was adopted on May 17, 1921. It consists of a simplified version of the coat of arms of the United States between the letters V and I (for 'Virgin Islands'). The yellow-colored eagle holds a sprig of laurel in one talon, which symbolizes victory, and three blue arrows in the other (unlike the thirteen arrows in the US coat of arms), which represent the three major islands that make up the U.S. Virgin Islands: Saint Croix, Saint Thomas, and Saint John. When the U.S. Virgin Islands were owned by Denmark, the flag was a blue ensign with the Danish flag, or Dannebrog ('cloth of the Danes'), in the canton.

== History ==
Colonial flag used in the Danish West Indies up until 1917.

Prior to Transfer Day 1917, the Danish colonial administration used a simple flag modeled on the Blue Ensign with the flag of Denmark in its canton. The Danish flag is popularly said to have fallen from the sky during a 1219 battle of the Danish king Valdemar II during the Livonian Crusade against the Estonians. The Nordic Cross on the flag represents Christianity.

The idea of a U.S. Virgin Islands flag began with the administration of Rear Admiral Sumner Ely Wetmore Kittelle, who was sworn in as governor of the islands on April 26, 1921. He approached Mr. White, captain of the Grebe, and Percival Wilson Sparks, a cartoonist, and asked them for suggestions for a flag design. Sparks immediately drew a design on paper. Afterwards, Sparks transferred it on heavy cotton material, then asked his wife Grace and her sister Blanche Joseph to embroider the design. The later result was what became the United States Virgin Islands flag.

== Transfer Day ==
Transfer Day commemorates the transfer of sovereignty over the islands from Denmark to the United States, which was first marked at an official ceremony in 1917 by the lowering of the Danish flag and the raising of the American flag in Charlotte Amalie. The United States had bought the U.S. Virgin Islands from Denmark for $25 million, which eventually meant changing the flag to represent the United States.

== See also ==
- Seal of the United States Virgin Islands
- Flags of the U.S. states and territories
- Flag of the British Virgin Islands
