= List of flag bearers for Armenia at the Olympics =

Armenia at the Olympics
- IOC code: ARM
- NOC: National Olympic Committee of Armenia
- Website: www.armnoc.am (in Armenian)
- Medals: Gold 2 Silver 11 Bronze 9 Total 22

Summer appearances
- 1996; 2000; 2004; 2008; 2012; 2016; 2020; 2024

Winter appearances
- 1994; 1998; 2002; 2006; 2010; 2014; 2018; 2022; 2026

Other related appearances
- Russian Empire (1900–1912); Soviet Union (1952–1988); Unified Team (1992)

This is a list of flag bearers who have represented Armenia at the Olympics.

Flag bearers carry the national flag of their country at the opening ceremony of the Olympic Games.

#	Event year	Season	Flag bearer	Sport
1	1994	Winter	Arsen Harutyunyan	Alpine skiing
2	1996	Summer	Aghvan Grigoryan	Weightlifting
3	1998	Winter	Alla Mikayelyan	Cross-country skiing
4	2000	Summer	Haykaz Galstyan	Greco-Roman wrestling
5	2002	Winter	Arsen Harutyunyan	Alpine skiing
6	2004	Summer	Albert Azaryan	Artistic gymnastics
7	2006	Winter	Vazgen Azrojan	Figure skating
8	2008	Summer	Albert Azaryan	Artistic gymnastics
9	2010	Winter	Arsen Nersisyan	Alpine skiing
10	2012	Summer	Arman Yeremyan	Taekwondo
11	2014	Winter	Sergey Mikayelyan	Cross-country skiing
12	2016	Summer	Vahan Mkhitaryan	Swimming
13	2018	Winter	Mikayel Mikayelyan	Cross-country skiing
14	2020	Summer	Hovhannes Bachkov	Boxing
14	2020	Summer	Varsenik Manucharyan	Swimming
15	2022	Winter	Tina Garabedian	Figure skating
15	2022	Winter	Mikayel Mikayelyan	Cross-country skiing
16	2024	Summer	Davit Chaloyan	Boxing
16	2024	Summer	Varsenik Manucharyan	Swimming
17	2026	Winter	Karina Akopova	Figure skating
17	2026	Winter	Nikita Rakhmanin	Figure skating

== See also ==
- Armenia at the Olympics
