= Armenia at the 1998 Winter Olympics =

- IOC code: ARM
- NOC: National Olympic Committee of Armenia
- Website: www.armnoc.am (in Armenian)

in Nagano
- Competitors: 7 (4 men, 3 women) in 4 sports
- Flag bearer: Alla Mikayelyan (cross-country skiing)
- Medals: Gold 0 Silver 0 Bronze 0 Total 0

Winter Olympics appearances (overview)
- 1994; 1998; 2002; 2006; 2010; 2014; 2018; 2022; 2026; 2030

Other related appearances
- Soviet Union (1956–1988); Unified Team (1992)

Armenia sent a delegation to compete at the 1998 Winter Olympics in Nagano, Japan, from 7–22 February 1998. This marked the nation's second appearance at a Winter Olympics as an independent country. The Armenian delegation consisted of seven athletes: four in figure skating, one in freestyle skiing, one in cross-country skiing, and one in alpine skiing.

== Competitors ==
The following is the list of number of competitors in the Games.

Sport	Men	Women	Total
Alpine skiing	1	0	1
Cross-country skiing	0	1	1
Figure skating	2	2	4
Freestyle skiing	1	0	1
Total	4	3	7

== Alpine skiing ==
Men

Athlete	Event	Race 1	Race 2	Total	
Athlete	Event	Time	Time	Time	Rank
Arsen Harutyunyan	Slalom	1:07.51	1:07.60	2:15.11	27

== Cross-country skiing ==
Women

Event	Athlete	Race	
Event	Athlete	Time	Rank
30 km F	Alla Mikayelyan	1'44:03.6	58

C = Classical style, F = Freestyle

== Figure skating ==
Pairs

Athletes	SP	FS	TFP	Rank
Mariya Krasiltseva; Aleksander Chestnikh	18	19	28.0	19

Ice Dancing

Athletes	CD1	CD2	OD	FD	TFP	Rank
Xenia Smetanenko; Samuel Gezalian	24	24	24	24	48.0	24

== Freestyle skiing ==
Men

Athlete	Event	Qualification			Final		
Athlete	Event	Time	Points	Rank	Time	Points	Rank
Armen Rafayelyan	Moguls	25.81	23.49	19	did not advance		
