= Ken Topalian =

American bobsledder

Personal information
- Born: 5 July 1963 (age 63) Pawtucket, Rhode Island, United States

Sport
- Country: Armenia
- Sport: Bobsleigh

Ken Topalian (born 5 July 1963) is an American bobsledder. He competed in the two man event at the 1994 Winter Olympics, representing Armenia. Along with Joe Almasian, they were the first athletes to represent Armenia at the Olympics.

== Biography ==
Topalian was born in Pawtucket, Rhode Island in 1963. He worked in an auto repair shop in his hometown and attended the University of Rhode Island.

Three years after Armenia had gained independence in 1991, Topalian and Joe Almasian formed a team with the aim to compete in the bobsled event at the 1994 Winter Olympics representing Armenia. This included getting a second-hand bobsled from American Samoa. They both attended the training centre in Lake Placid to learn how to bobsled, being trained by Jim Hickey who had previously represented the United States at the Olympics in the event. They could train for three hours each day at the weekend, using a sled from the 1960s. To qualify for the Olympics, both of them gained Armenian citizenship and competed in five international races.

With less than three weeks before the start of the 1994 Winter Olympics, Topalian and Almasian were given permission by the Armenian government to compete at the games. They were the only athletes to represent Armenia at the 1994 Winter Olympics. They finished in 36th place in the two-man event, ahead of seven other teams. Neither of them competed in the event since the Olympics, and they had never been to Armenia.
