= Armenia at the Olympics =

- IOC code: ARM
- NOC: National Olympic Committee of Armenia
- Website: www.armnoc.am (in Armenian)
- Medals Ranked 90th: Gold 2 Silver 11 Bronze 9 Total 22

Summer appearances
- 1996; 2000; 2004; 2008; 2012; 2016; 2020; 2024; 2028

Winter appearances
- 1994; 1998; 2002; 2006; 2010; 2014; 2018; 2022; 2026

Other related appearances
- Russian Empire (1900–1912); Soviet Union (1952–1988); Unified Team (1992)

Armenia first participated at the Olympic Games as an independent nation in 1994, and has sent athletes to compete in every Summer Olympic Games and Winter Olympic Games since then.

Previously, Armenian athletes competed as part of the Soviet Union from 1952 to 1988, and after the dissolution of the Soviet Union, Armenia was part of the Unified Team in 1992.

Armenian athletes have won a total of 22 medals, in wrestling, weightlifting, artistic gymnastics, and boxing.

The National Olympic Committee of Armenia was created in 1990 and was recognized by the International Olympic Committee in 1993.

== Medal tables ==
=== Medals by Summer Games ===
Games	Athletes	Gold	Silver	Bronze	Total	Rank
1900–1912	as part of the Russian Empire					
1920–1948	did not participate					
1952–1988	as part of the Soviet Union					
1992 Barcelona	as part of the Unified Team					
1996 Atlanta	32	1	1	0	2	45
2000 Sydney	25	0	0	1	1	71
2004 Athens	18	0	0	0	0	–
2008 Beijing	25	0	1	4	5	62
2012 London	25	0	1	1	2	65
2016 Rio de Janeiro	32	1	3	0	4	42
2020 Tokyo	17	0	2	2	4	69
2024 Paris	15	0	3	1	4	66
2028 Los Angeles	future event					
2032 Brisbane	future event					
Total		2	11	9	22	90

=== Medals by Winter Games ===
Games	Athletes	Gold	Silver	Bronze	Total	Rank
1956–1988	as part of the Soviet Union					
1992 Albertville	as part of the Unified Team					
1994 Lillehammer	2	0	0	0	0	–
1998 Nagano	7	0	0	0	0	–
2002 Salt Lake City	9	0	0	0	0	–
2006 Turin	5	0	0	0	0	–
2010 Vancouver	4	0	0	0	0	–
2014 Sochi	4	0	0	0	0	–
2018 Pyeongchang	3	0	0	0	0	–
2022 Beijing	6	0	0	0	0	–
2026 Milano Cortina	5	0	0	0	0	–
2030 French Alps	future event					
2034 Utah	future event					
Total		0	0	0	0	–

=== Medals by summer sport ===
Sport	Gold	Silver	Bronze	Total
Wrestling	2	5	4	11
Weightlifting	0	5	2	7
Gymnastics	0	1	1	2
Boxing	0	0	2	2
Totals (4 entries)	2	11	9	22

== List of medalists ==
Medal	Name	Games	Sport	Event
Gold	Armen Nazaryan	1996 Atlanta	Wrestling	Men's Greco-Roman 52 kg
Silver	Armen Mkrtchyan	1996 Atlanta	Wrestling	Men's freestyle 48 kg
Bronze	Arsen Melikyan	2000 Sydney	Weightlifting	Men's 77 kg
Silver	Tigran Vardan Martirosyan	2008 Beijing	Weightlifting	Men's 85 kg
Bronze	Hrachik Javakhyan	2008 Beijing	Boxing	Men's Lightweight
Bronze	Gevorg Davtyan	2008 Beijing	Weightlifting	Men's 77 kg
Bronze	Roman Amoyan	2008 Beijing	Wrestling	Men's Greco-Roman 55 kg
Bronze	Yuri Patrikeyev	2008 Beijing	Wrestling	Men's Greco-Roman 120 kg
Silver	Arsen Julfalakyan	2012 London	Wrestling	Men's Greco-Roman 74 kg
Bronze	Artur Aleksanyan	2012 London	Wrestling	Men's Greco-Roman 96 kg
Gold	Artur Aleksanyan	2016 Rio de Janeiro	Wrestling	Men's Greco-Roman 98 kg
Silver	Simon Martirosyan	2016 Rio de Janeiro	Weightlifting	Men's 105 kg
Silver	Mihran Harutyunyan	2016 Rio de Janeiro	Wrestling	Men's Greco-Roman 66 kg
Silver	Gor Minasyan	2016 Rio de Janeiro	Weightlifting	Men's +105 kg
Silver	Artur Aleksanyan	2020 Tokyo	Wrestling	Men's Greco-Roman 97 kg
Silver	Simon Martirosyan	2020 Tokyo	Weightlifting	Men's 109 kg
Bronze	Hovhannes Bachkov	2020 Tokyo	Boxing	Men's Lightweight
Bronze	Artur Davtyan	2020 Tokyo	Gymnastics	Men's Vault
Silver	Artur Davtyan	2024 Paris	Gymnastics	Men's Vault
Silver	Artur Aleksanyan	2024 Paris	Wrestling	Men's Greco-Roman 97 kg
Silver	Varazdat Lalayan	2024 Paris	Weightlifting	Men's +102 kg
Bronze	Malkhas Amoyan	2024 Paris	Wrestling	Men's Greco-Roman 77 kg

== Flagbearers ==
Summer Olympics
Games	Athlete	Sport
1996 Atlanta	Aghvan Grigoryan	Weightlifting
2000 Sydney	Haykaz Galstyan	Wrestling
2004 Athens	Albert Azaryan	Artistic gymnastics
2008 Beijing	Albert Azaryan	Artistic gymnastics
2012 London	Arman Yeremyan	Taekwondo
2016 Rio de Janeiro	Vahan Mkhitaryan	Swimming
2020 Tokyo	Hovhannes Bachkov & Varsenik Manucharyan	Boxing (Bachkov) & Swimming (Manucharyan)

Winter Olympics
Games	Athlete	Sport
1994 Lillehammer	Arsen Harutyunyan	Alpine skiing
1998 Nagano	Alla Mikayelyan	Cross-country skiing
2002 Salt Lake City	Arsen Harutyunyan	Alpine skiing
2006 Turin	Vazgen Azrojan	Figure skating
2010 Vancouver	Arsen Nersisyan	Alpine skiing
2014 Sochi	Sergey Mikayelyan	Cross-country skiing
2018 Pyeongchang	Mikayel Mikayelyan	Cross-country skiing

== See also ==
- Armenian Olympic Committee
- Armenia at the Paralympics
- List of Armenian Olympic medalists
- Olympic competitors for Armenia
- Pan-Armenian Games
- Sport in Armenia
