= Joe Almasian =

American bobsledder

Personal information
- Born: 8 March 1967 (age 59) Framingham, Massachusetts, United States

Sport
- Sport: Bobsleigh

Joseph Michael Almasian (born 8 March 1967) is an American bobsledder. He competed in the two man event at the 1994 Winter Olympics, representing Armenia. Along with Ken Topalian, they were the first athletes to represent Armenia at the Olympics.

== Biography ==
Almasian was born in Framingham, Massachusetts in 1967. He worked as a mechanical engineer in Sherborn, Massachusetts. While he was at the University of New Hampshire he was a track athlete and played soccer.

Three years after Armenia had gained independence in 1991, Almasian and Ken Topalian formed a team with the aim to compete in the bobsled event at the 1994 Winter Olympics representing Armenia. This included getting a second-hand bobsled from American Samoa. They both attended the training centre in Lake Placid to learn how to bobsled, being trained by Jim Hickey who had previously represented the United States at the Olympics in the event. They could train for three hours each day at the weekend, using a sled from the 1960s. To qualify for the Olympics, both of them gained Armenian citizenship and competed in five international races.

With less than three weeks before the start of the 1994 Winter Olympics, Almasian and Topalian were given permission by the Armenian government to compete at the games. They were the only athletes to represent Armenia at the 1994 Winter Olympics. They finished in 36th place in the two-man event, ahead of seven other teams. Neither of them competed in the event since the Olympics, and they had never been to Armenia.

Almasian's participation at the Olympics was in honour of his grandparents, who escaped the Armenian genocide in 1915.
