= Armenia at the 2002 Winter Olympics =

- IOC code: ARM
- NOC: National Olympic Committee of Armenia
- Website: www.armnoc.am (in Armenian)

in Salt Lake City
- Competitors: 9 (5 men, 4 women) in 4 sports
- Flag bearer: Arsen Harutyunyan (alpine skiing)
- Medals: Gold 0 Silver 0 Bronze 0 Total 0

Winter Olympics appearances (overview)
- 1994; 1998; 2002; 2006; 2010; 2014; 2018; 2022; 2026

Other related appearances
- Soviet Union (1956–1988); Unified Team (1992)

Armenia competed at the 2002 Winter Olympics in Salt Lake City, United States.

== Alpine skiing ==
Men

Athlete	Event	Race 1	Race 2	Total	
Athlete	Event	Time	Time	Time	Rank
Arsen Harutyunyan	Slalom	DNF			

Women

Athlete	Event	Race 1	Race 2	Total	
Athlete	Event	Time	Time	Time	Rank
Vanesa Rakedzhyan	Giant slalom	1:42.66	1:21.05	3:03.71	47
Vanesa Rakedzhyan	Slalom	58.59	1:00.53	1:59.12	29

== Bobsleigh ==
Athletes	Event	Run 1		Run 2		Run 3		Run 4		Total	
Athletes	Event	Time	Rank	Time	Rank	Time	Rank	Time	Rank	Time	Rank
Yorgo Alexandrou; Dan Janjigian	Two-man	49.53	33	49.50	34	49.75	33	49.33	31	3:18.11	33

== Cross-country skiing ==
Distance

Athlete	Event	Race	
Athlete	Event	Time	Rank
Aram Hadzhiyan	Men's 15 km classical	46:42.9	66
Aram Hadzhiyan	Men's 30 km freestyle	1:24:07.5	62
Aram Hadzhiyan	Men's 50 km classical	2:48:48.1	56
Margarita Nikolyan	Women's 10 km classical	38:16.4	56
Margarita Nikolyan	Women's 15 km freestyle	DSQ	

Pursuit

Athlete	Event	10 km Classical		10 km Freestyle pursuit	
Athlete	Event	Time	Rank	Time	Final rank
Aram Hadzhiyan	Men's 20 km pursuit	31:52.7	71	LAP	
Margarita Nikolyan	Women's 10 km pursuit	17:23.6	69	Did not advance	

Sprint

Athlete	Event	Qualifying round		Quarter finals		Semi finals		Finals	
Athlete	Event	Time	Rank	Time	Rank	Time	Rank	Time	Final rank
Aram Hadzhiyan	Men's sprint	3:24.89	63	Did not advance					
Margarita Nikolyan	Women's sprint	4:13.55	58	Did not advance					

== Figure skating ==
Women

Athlete	Points	SP	FS	Rank
Julia Lebedeva	DNF			

Pairs

Athletes	Points	SP	FS	Rank
Maria Krasiltseva; Artem Znachkov	30.0	20	20	20
