= Armenia at the 2014 Winter Olympics =

- IOC code: ARM
- NOC: National Olympic Committee of Armenia
- Website: www.armnoc.am (in Armenian)

in Sochi
- Competitors: 4 in 2 sports
- Flag bearer: Sergey Mikayelyan (opening) Arman Serebrakian (closing)
- Medals: Gold 0 Silver 0 Bronze 0 Total 0

Winter Olympics appearances (overview)
- 1994; 1998; 2002; 2006; 2010; 2014; 2018; 2022; 2026

Other related appearances
- Soviet Union (1956–1988); Unified Team (1992)

Armenia competed at the 2014 Winter Olympics in Sochi, Russia from 7 to 23 February 2014. The team consists of four athletes competing in two sports. Both male cross-country skiers qualified for their events, while the other two athletes received wildcards.

== Alpine skiing ==
According to the quota allocation released on 20 January 2014, Armenia has one athlete in qualification position. The final team was announced on 21 January 2014.

Athlete	Event	Run 1		Run 2		Total	
Athlete	Event	Time	Rank	Time	Rank	Time	Rank
Arman Serebrakian	Men's giant slalom	1:29.59	54	1:28.81	42	2:58.40	46
Arman Serebrakian	Men's slalom	55.90	60	1:04.67	32	2:00.57	35

== Cross-country skiing ==
According to the quota allocation released on 20 January 2014, Armenia has three athletes in qualification position. The final team was announced on 21 January 2014.

Athlete	Event	Classical		Freestyle		Final		
Athlete	Event	Time	Rank	Time	Rank	Time	Deficit	Rank
Sergey Mikayelyan	Men's 15 km classical	—				42:39.1	+4:09.4	46
Sergey Mikayelyan	Men's 30 km skiathlon	38:43.1	51	33:59.8	39	1:13:16.6	+5:01.2	46
Artur Yeghoyan	Men's 15 km classical	—				DNS		
Artur Yeghoyan	Men's 30 km skiathlon	40:11.7	63	36:51.0	63	1:17:44.5	+9:29.1	63
Katya Galstyan	Women's 10 km classical	—				35:26.4	+7:08.6	61

== See also ==
- Armenia at the 2014 Summer Youth Olympics
