= Yeghoyan =

Yeghoyan (Armenian: Եղոյեան), also spelled as Egoyan, is an Armenian surname. Notable people with the surname include:

- Artur Yeghoyan (born 1990), Armenian cross-country skier
- Atom Egoyan (born 1960), Armenian–Canadian filmmaker
- Eve Egoyan (born 1964), Armenian–Canadian pianist and artist
