= Armenia at the 2010 Winter Olympics =

- IOC code: ARM
- NOC: National Olympic Committee of Armenia
- Website: www.armnoc.am (in Armenian)

in Vancouver
- Competitors: 4 in 2 sports
- Flag bearer: Arsen Nersisyan
- Medals: Gold 0 Silver 0 Bronze 0 Total 0

Winter Olympics appearances (overview)
- 1994; 1998; 2002; 2006; 2010; 2014; 2018; 2022; 2026

Other related appearances
- Soviet Union (1956–1988); Unified Team (1992)

Armenia sent a delegation to compete at the 2010 Winter Olympics in Vancouver, British Columbia, Canada from 12 to 28 February 2010. This marked the nation's fifth appearance at a Winter Olympics as an independent country. The Armenian delegation consisted of four athletes, two in alpine skiing and two in cross-country skiing. The team's best finish in any event was a 70th place mark by Sergey Mikayelyan in the men's 15 kilometre freestyle cross-country event.

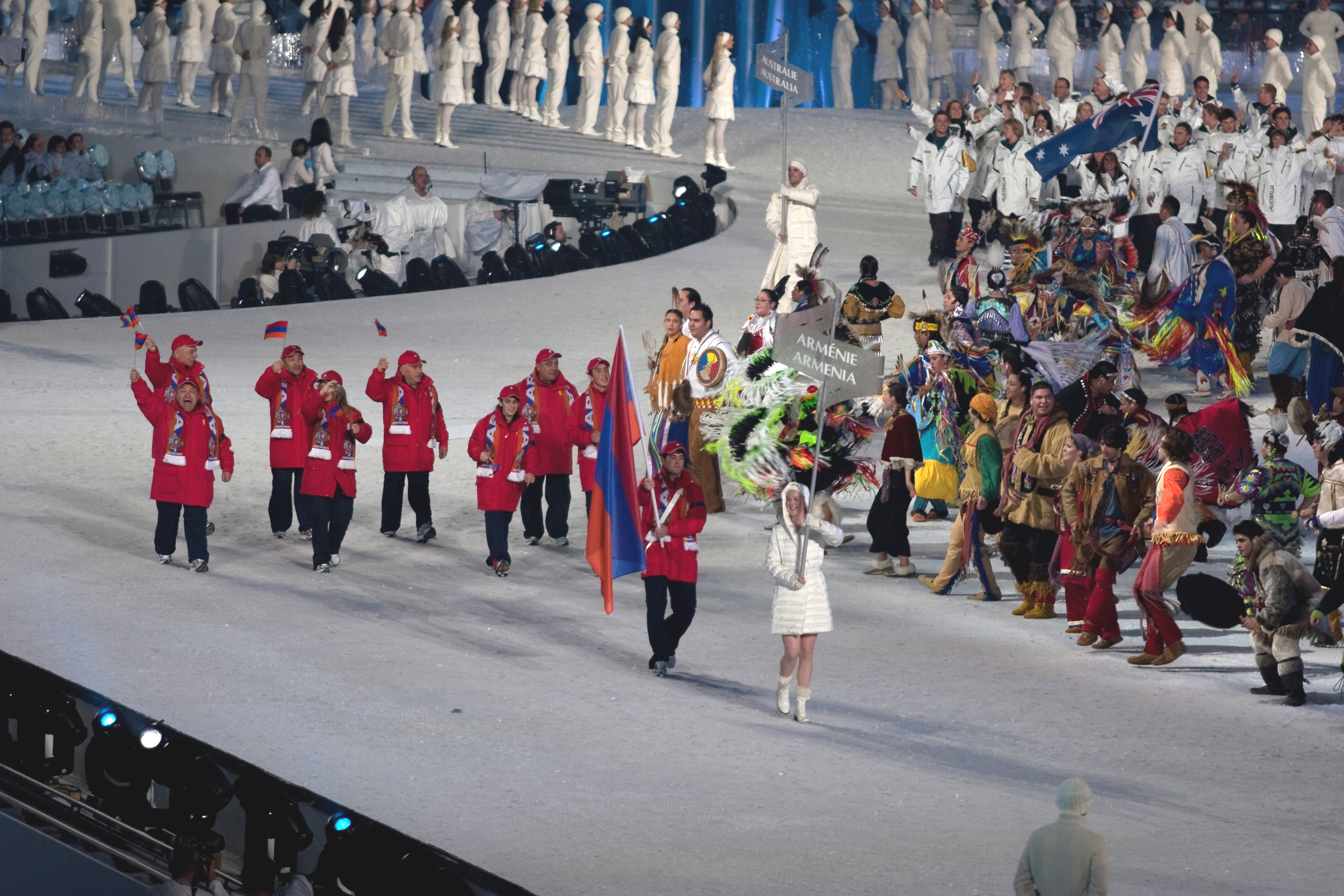
The athletes entering the stadium during the opening ceremonies.

== Background ==
Armenia became an independent nation again following the dissolution of the Soviet Union in 1991. The National Olympic Committee of Armenia was recognized by the International Olympic Committee on 31 December 1992. Armenia participated in their first Olympics in Lillehammer at the 1994 Winter Olympics, and has sent a delegation to every Summer and Winter Olympics since. While Armenia has won multiple medals at the Summer Olympics, they had never won a Winter Olympics medal as of the close of these Vancouver Olympics. The Armenian delegation to Vancouver consisted of four athletes, two in alpine skiing and two in cross-country skiing. Alpine skier Arsen Nersisyan was chosen as the flag bearer for the opening ceremony, while cross-country skier Sergey Mikayelyan was chosen as flag bearer for the closing ceremony.

== Alpine skiing ==
Arsen Nersisyan was 22 at the time of the Vancouver Olympics and was making his Olympic debut. On 23 February, he failed to finish the first run of the giant slalom. On 27 February, he participated in the slalom, but after skiing a first run time of 1 minute and 5 seconds, he was disqualified from the competition for "improper gate movement". He said he was disqualified "because coming out of the starting gate, my skies parted." Ani-Matilda Serebrakian was 21 years old at the time of these Games, and was also making her first Olympics appearance. On 24 February, in challenging weather conditions, she did not finish the first leg of the giant slalom. Two days later, she was disqualified from the Women's slalom, reportedly for using skis that fell outside of the allowed size tolerances.

Athlete	Event	Run 1	Run 2	Total	Rank
Arsen Nersisyan	Men's slalom	DSQ			
Arsen Nersisyan	Men's giant slalom	DNF			
Ani-Matilda Serebrakian	Women's slalom	DSQ			
Ani-Matilda Serebrakian	Women's giant slalom	DNF			

== Cross-country skiing ==
Kristine Khachatryan was 20 years old at the time of the Games, while Sergey Mikayelyan was 17; both were making their first Olympic appearances. Mikayelyan would later go on to represent Armenia at the 2014 Winter Olympics in Sochi, Russia. O n 15 February, Khachatryan competed in the women's 10 kilometre freestyle event, finishing in a time of 23 minutes and 17 seconds, which put her in 75th place out of 77 classified finishers. That same day, Mikayelyan skied the men's 15 kilometre freestyle, finishing in a time of 37 minutes and 59 seconds, which was Armenia's best finish of the games; 70th place out of 95 finishers.

Athlete	Event	Final	
Athlete	Event	Time	Rank
Kristine Khachatryan	Women's 10 kilometre freestyle	34:17.5	75
Sergey Mikayelyan	Men's 15 kilometre freestyle	37:58.9	70

== See also ==
- Armenia at the 2010 Summer Youth Olympics
- Armenia at the 2010 Winter Paralympics
