= Armenia at the 2026 Winter Olympics =

- Flag of Armenia
- IOC code: ARM
- NOC: Armenian Olympic Committee
- Website: www.armnoc.am/eng

in Milan and Cortina d'Ampezzo, Italy 6 February 2026 – 22 February 2026
- Competitors: 5 (3 men and 2 women) in 3 sports
- Flag bearers (opening): Nikita Rakhmanin & Karina Akopova
- Flag bearer (closing): Volunteer
- Medals: Gold 0 Silver 0 Bronze 0 Total 0

Winter Olympics appearances (overview)
- 1994; 1998; 2002; 2006; 2010; 2014; 2018; 2022; 2026

Other related appearances
- Soviet Union (1956–1988); Unified Team (1992)

Armenia competed at the 2026 Winter Olympics in Milan and Cortina d'Ampezzo, Italy, from 6 to 22 February 2026.

Figure skaters Nikita Rakhmanin and Karina Akopova were the country's flagbearer during the opening ceremony. Meanwhile, a volunteer was the country's flagbearer during the closing ceremony.

== Competitors ==
The following is the list of number of competitors participating at the Games per sport/discipline.

Sport	Men	Women	Total
Alpine skiing	1	0	1
Cross-country skiing	1	1	2
Figure skating	1	1	2
Total	3	2	5

== Alpine skiing ==
Armenia qualified one male alpine skier through the basic quota.

Athlete	Event	Run 1		Run 2		Total	
Athlete	Event	Time	Rank	Time	Rank	Time	Rank
Harutyun Harutyunyan	Men's giant slalom	1:27.93	63	1:21.67	59	2:50.58	59
Harutyun Harutyunyan	Men's slalom	1:10.12	37	DSQ			

== Cross-country skiing ==
Armenia qualified one female and one male cross-country skier. Following the completion of the 2024–25 FIS Cross-Country World Cup, Armenia also qualified an additional one female athlete, however they do not (as of 26 March 2025) have any eligible athletes to fill these additional quotas.

Distance

Athlete	Event	Classical		Freestyle		Final		
Athlete	Event	Time	Rank	Time	Rank	Time	Deficit	Rank
Mikayel Mikayelyan	Men's skiathlon	26:07.2	51	26:37.2	51	51:06.8	+4:55.8	48
Mikayel Mikayelyan	Men's freestyle	—N/a		23:06.4	53	—N/a		
Katya Galstyan	Women's skiathlon	35:41.9	69	38.7	69	LAP		
Katya Galstyan	Women's freestyle	—N/a		28:33.7	82	—N/a		

Sprint

Athlete	Event	1.8km			3.7km			4.9km			7.4km			8.6km			9.0km			Finish		
Athlete	Event	Time	Deficit	Rank	Time	Deficit	Rank	Time	Deficit	Rank	Time	Deficit	Rank	Time	Deficit	Rank	Time	Deficit	Rank	Time	Deficit	Rank
Mikayel Mikayelyan	Men's freestyle	3:47.9	21.3	51	7:51.5	45.6	59	11:51.9	1:24.5	57	16:44.9	1:54.4	54	20:05.3	2:14.3	55	20:48.8	2:15.8	55	23:06.6	2:30.2	54
Katya Galstyan	Women's freestyle	5:00.5	1.00.5	93	10:08.5	2:12.8	98	14:56.1	3:15.3	88	20:51.9	4:23.2	86	24:48.9	5:02.7	83	25:49.3	5:19.6	83	28:33.7	5:44.5	82

== Figure skating ==
Armenia earned one quota in pairs at the ISU Skate to Milano Figure Skating Qualifier 2025 in Beijing, China.

Athlete	Event	SP		FP		Total	
Athlete	Event	Points	Rank	Points	Rank	Points	Rank
Karina Akopova; Nikita Rakhmanin	Pairs	66.27	12 Q	114.39	14	180.66	14

== See also ==
- Armenia at the 2026 Winter Paralympics
