= Ghukasavan =

Ghukasavan Ղուկասավան
- Location within Armenia Location within Ararat
- Coordinates: 40°07′34″N 44°25′04″E
- Country: Armenia
- Province: Ararat
- Municipality: Masis

Population (2011)
  - Total: 2,019
- Time zone: UTC+4
  - Summer (DST): UTC+5

Ghukasavan (Armenian: Ղուկասավան) is a village in the Masis Municipality of the Ararat Province of Armenia. It was renamed in 1949 in honor of Ghukas Ghukasian, founder of the Armenian Communist Youth Movement.

== History ==
The village was founded in the 1600s. The village was settled by Armenians from Western Armenia, survivors of the Armenian genocide from 1915–1917, and later from 1946–1948 by Persian-Armenians. In the 1930s, during the Soviet regime, Yezidi families also settled in the village. It used to have the names Kalal, Kalali, Kolara, Kyalara. Ghukasavan was renamed in 1949. The name is conditioned by the name of revolutionary figure Ghukas Ghukasyan, who was born in this village.

In the center of the village is earthquake destroyed St. Astvatsatsin Church.

The village is located in the Ararat valley, in the valley of the Hrazdan river. It is 845 meters above sea level.

== Gallery ==
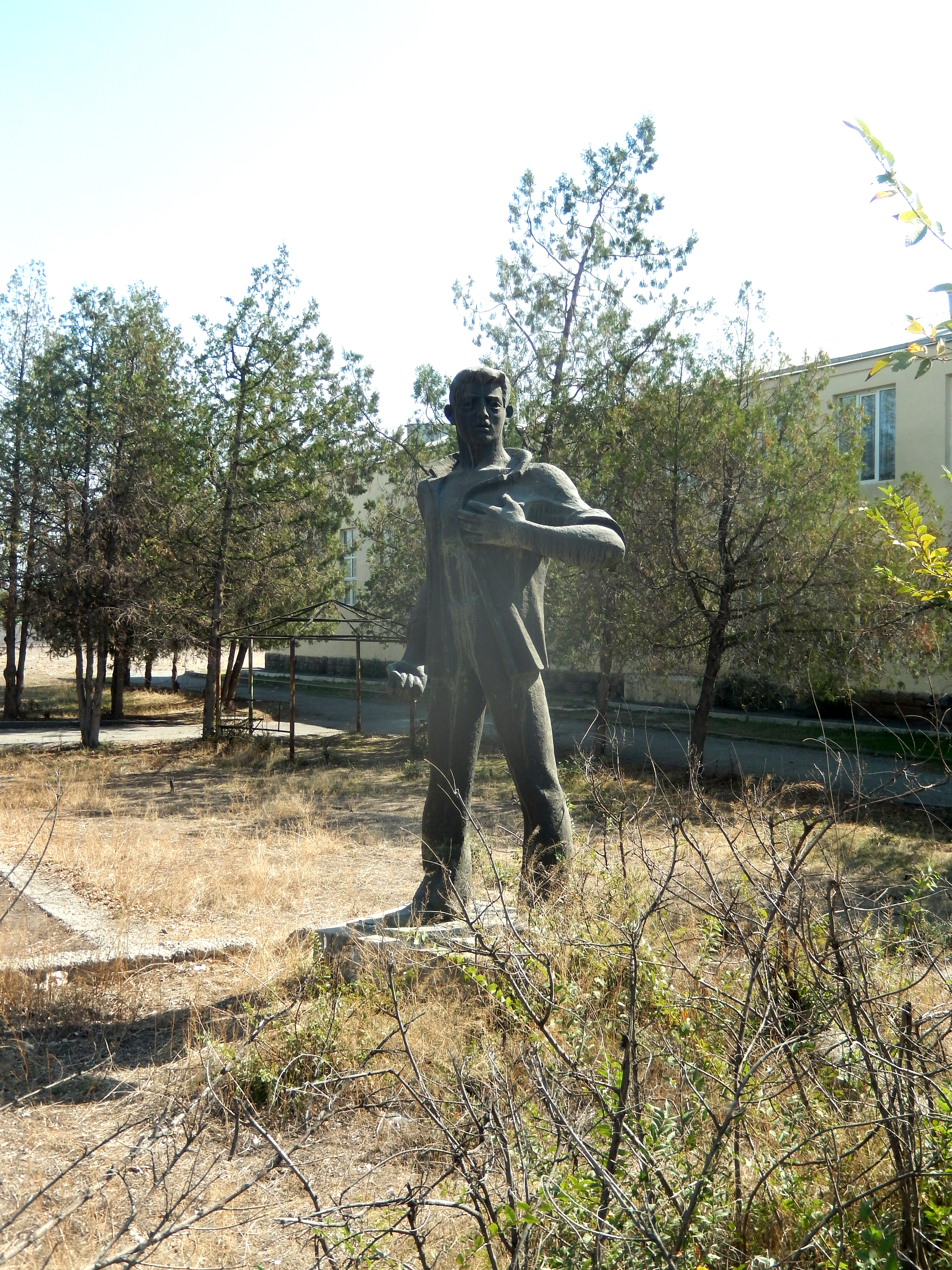
Ghukas Ghukasyan's monument, Ghukasavan

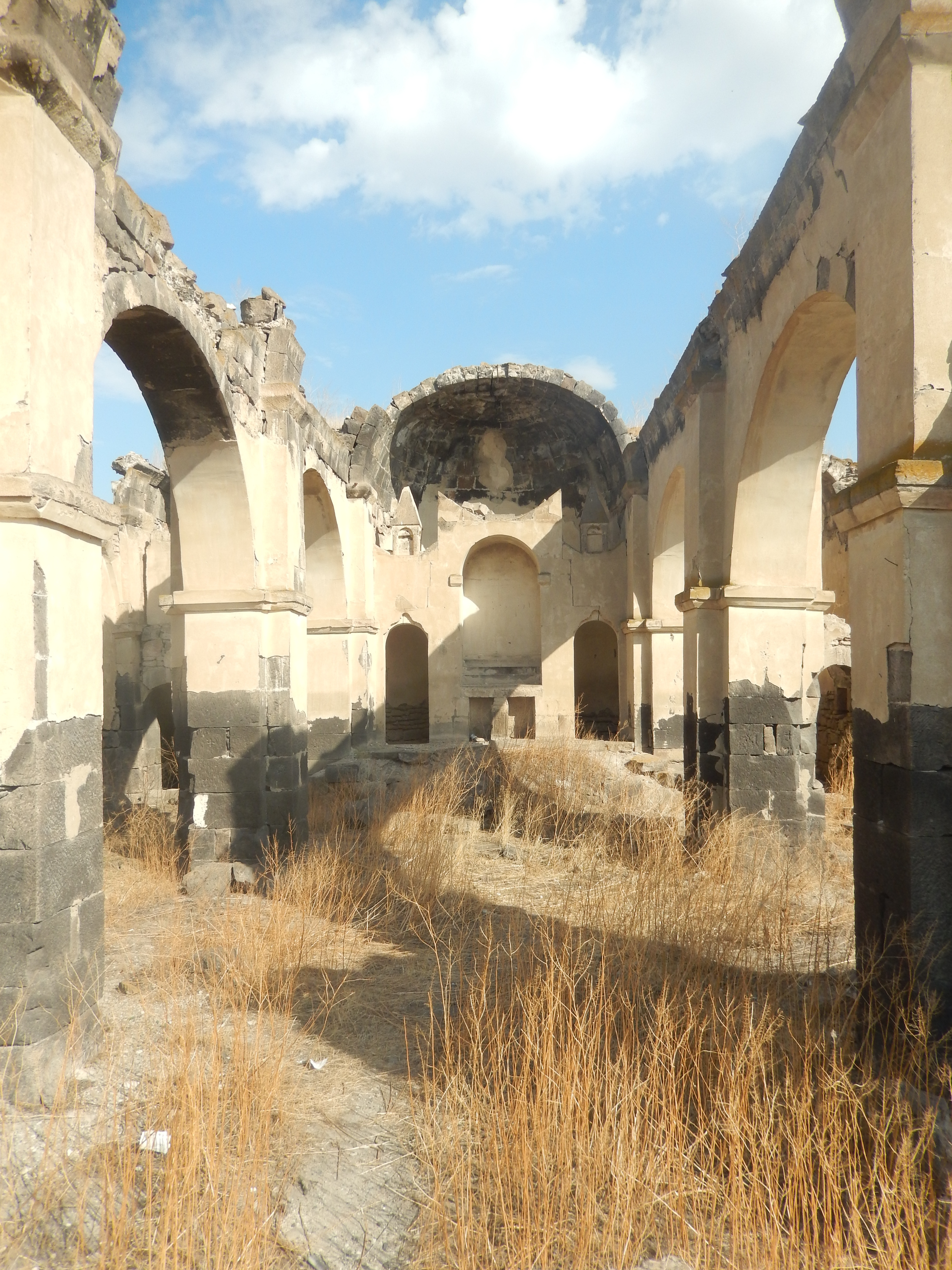
St. Astvatsatsin Church

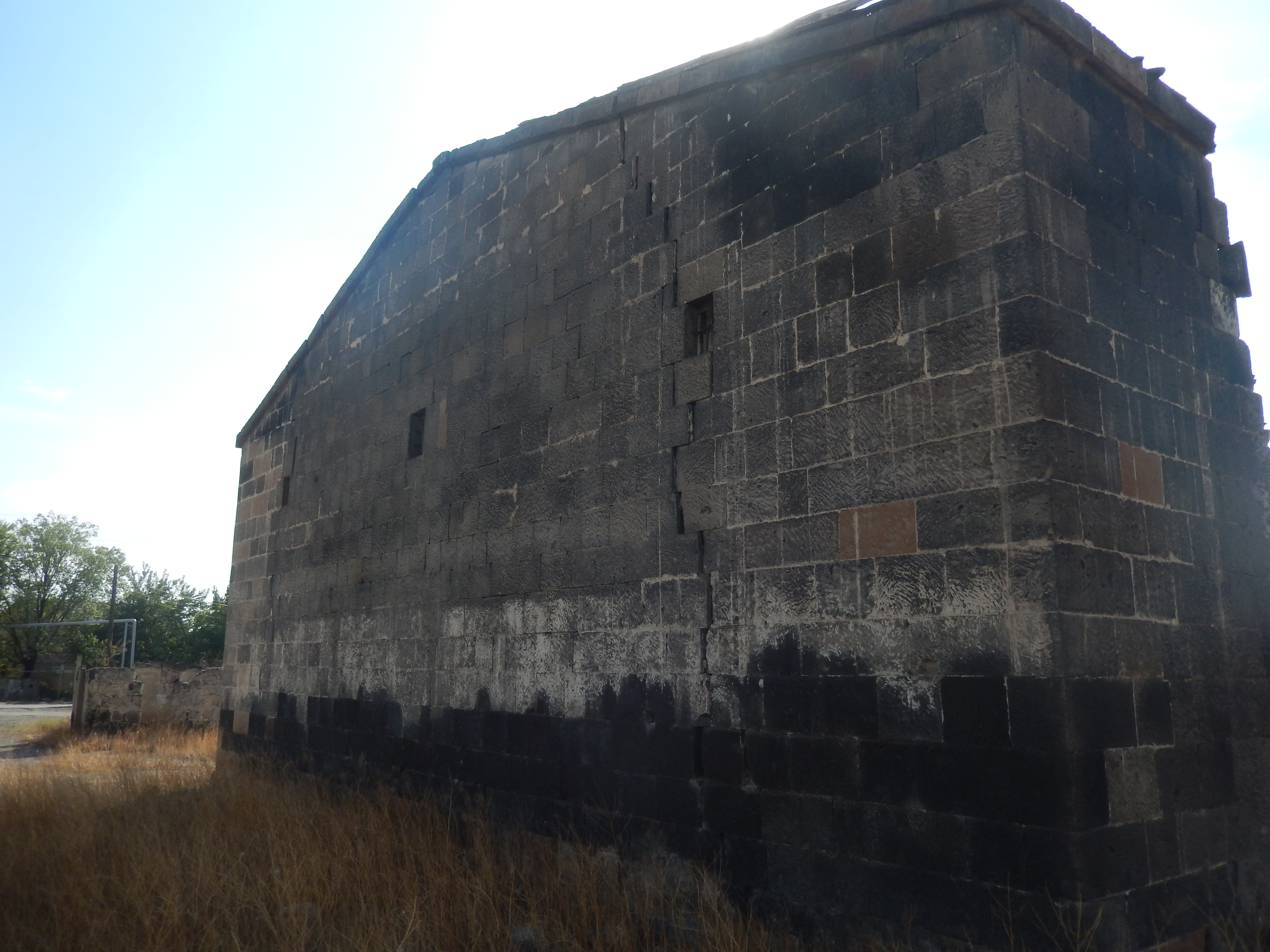
St. Astvatsatsin Church

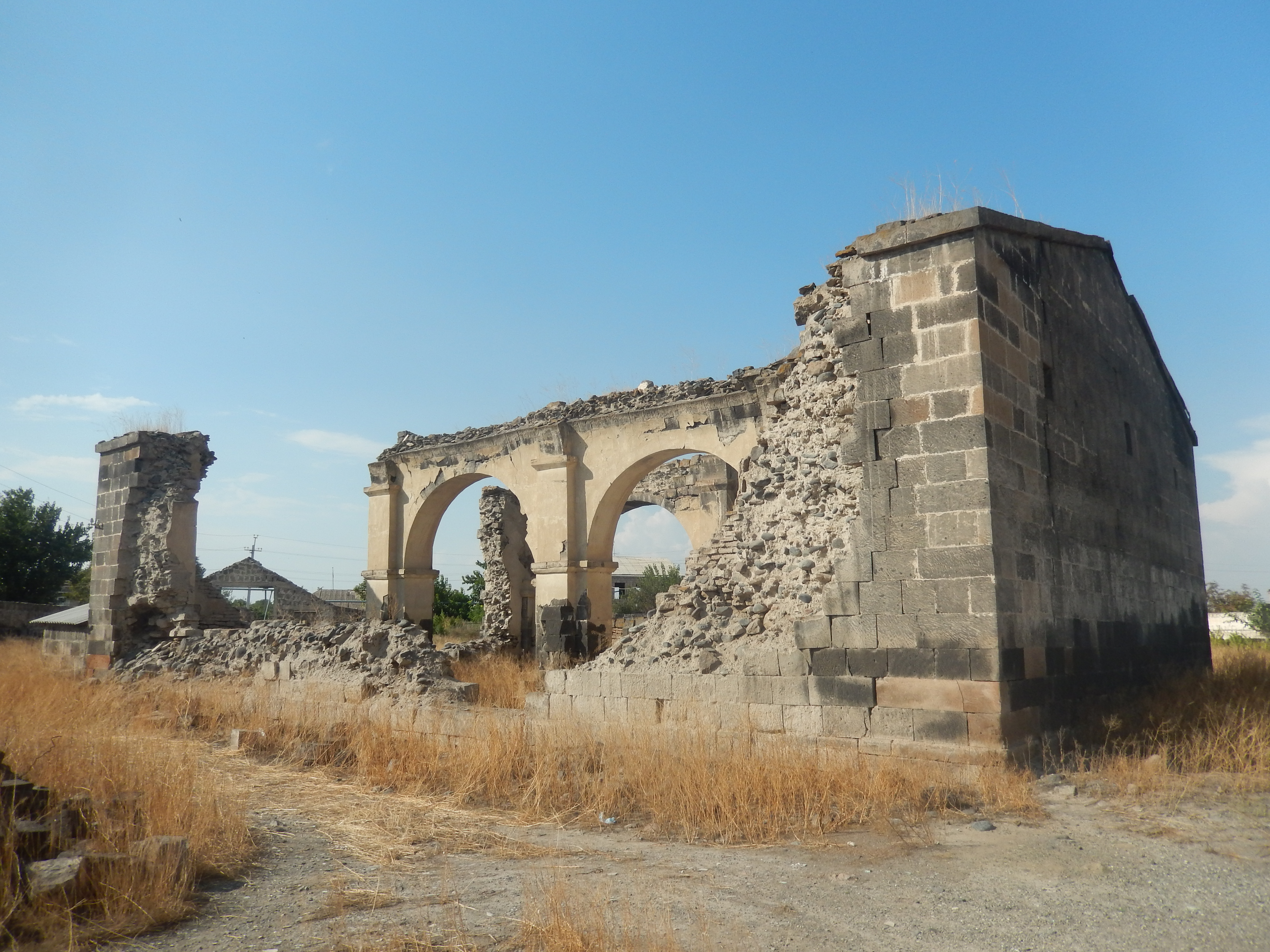
St. Astvatsatsin Church

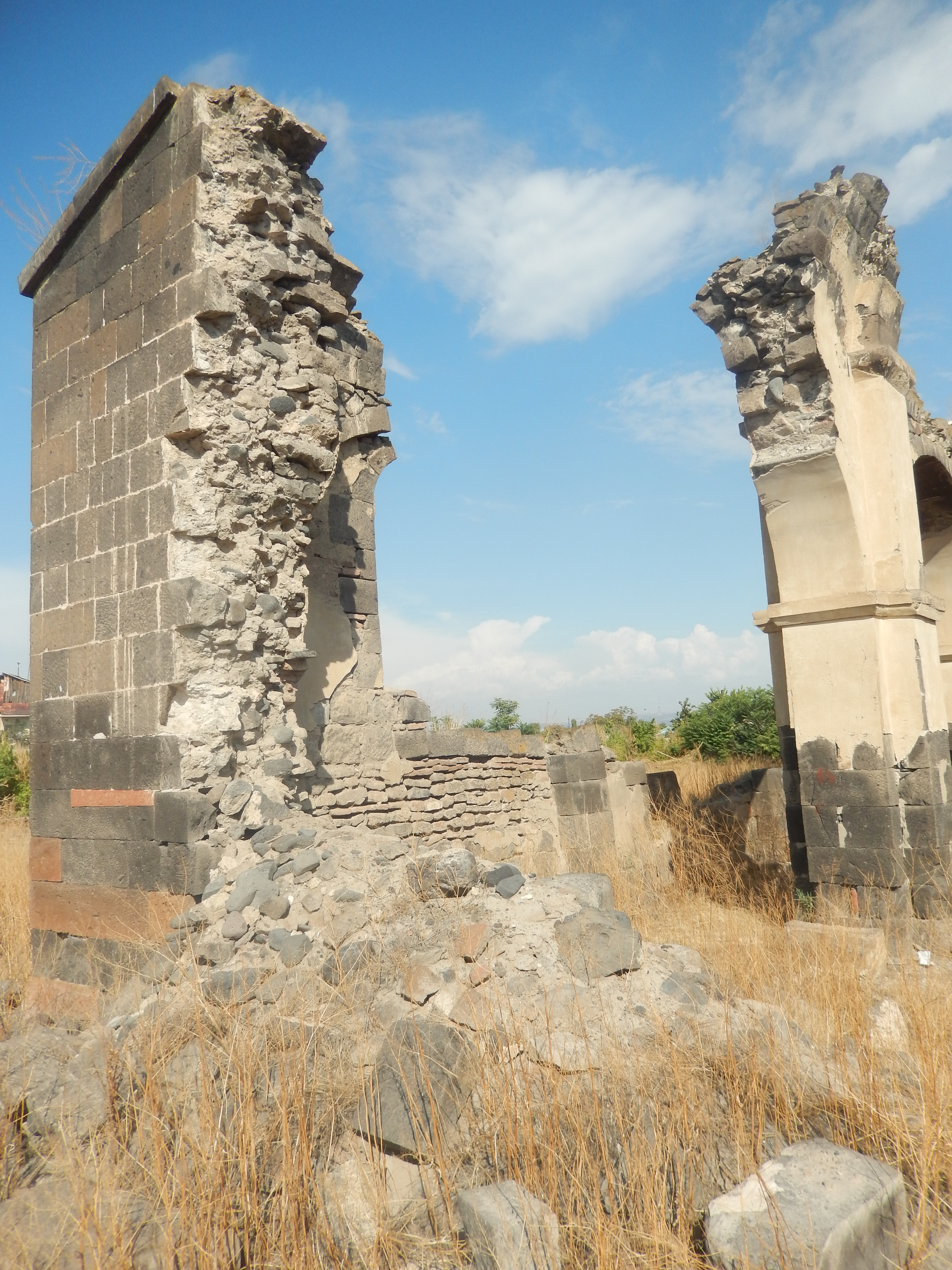
St. Astvatsatsin Church

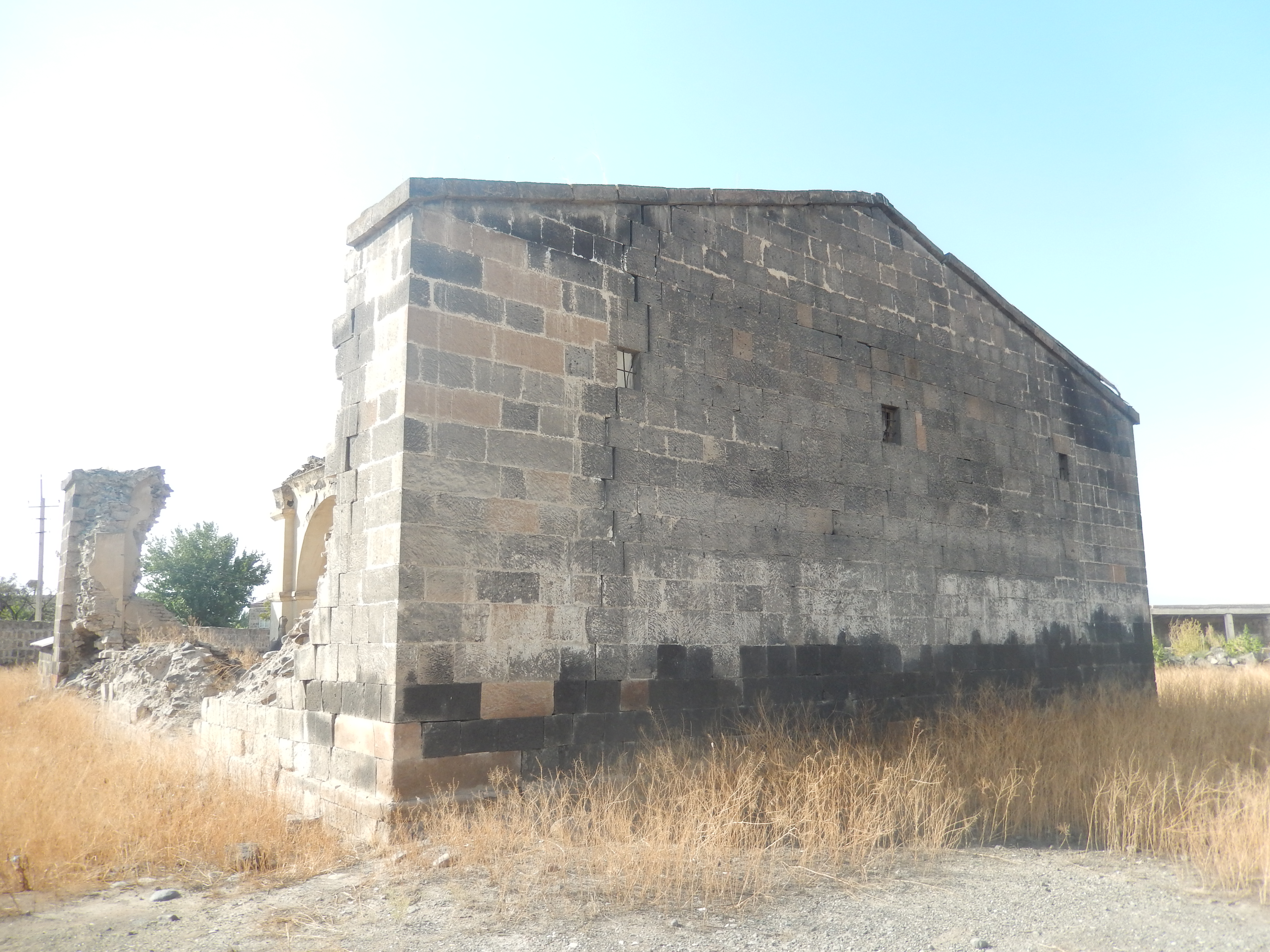
St. Astvatsatsin Church

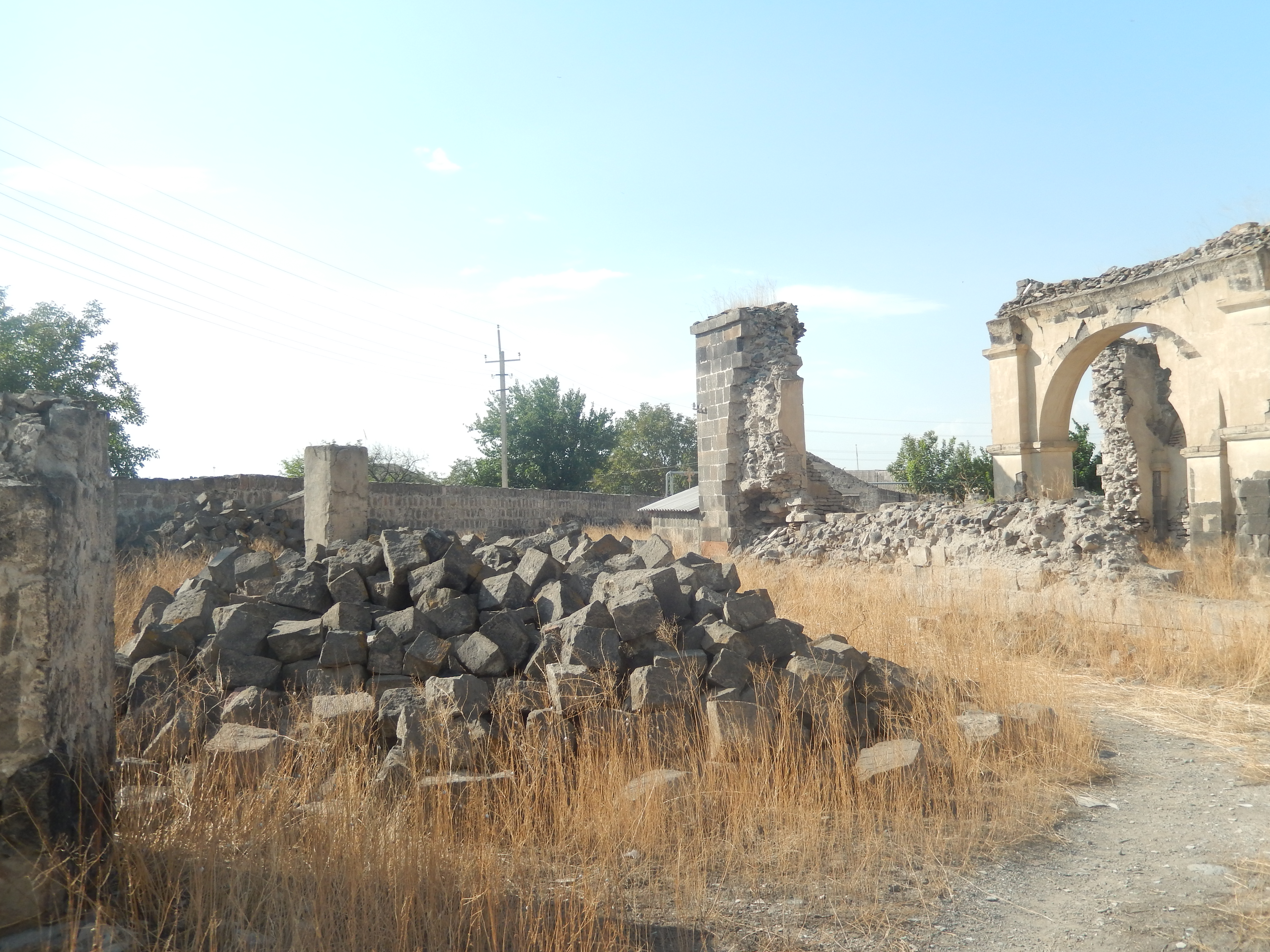
St. Astvatsatsin Church

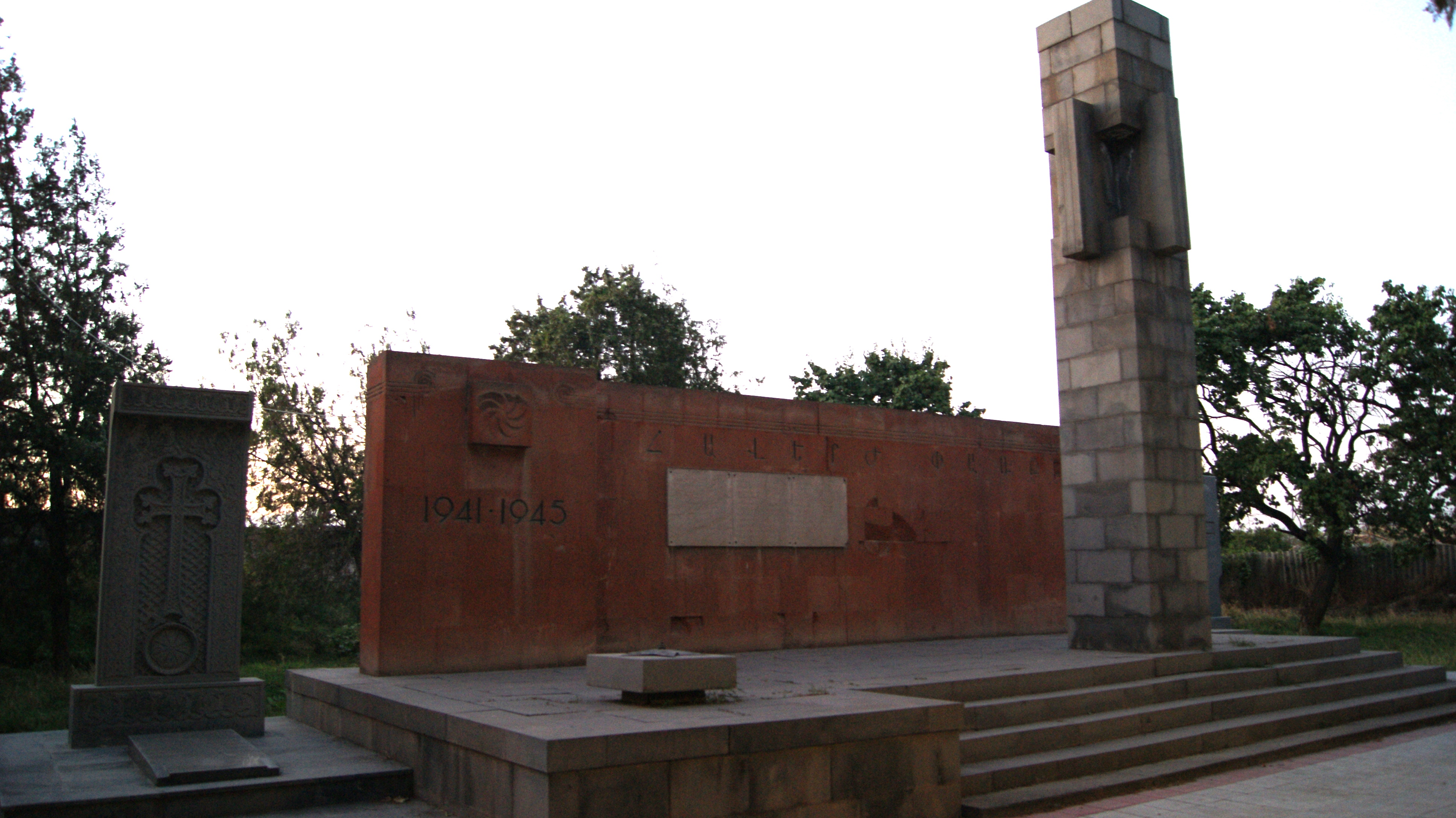
Monument for WW2

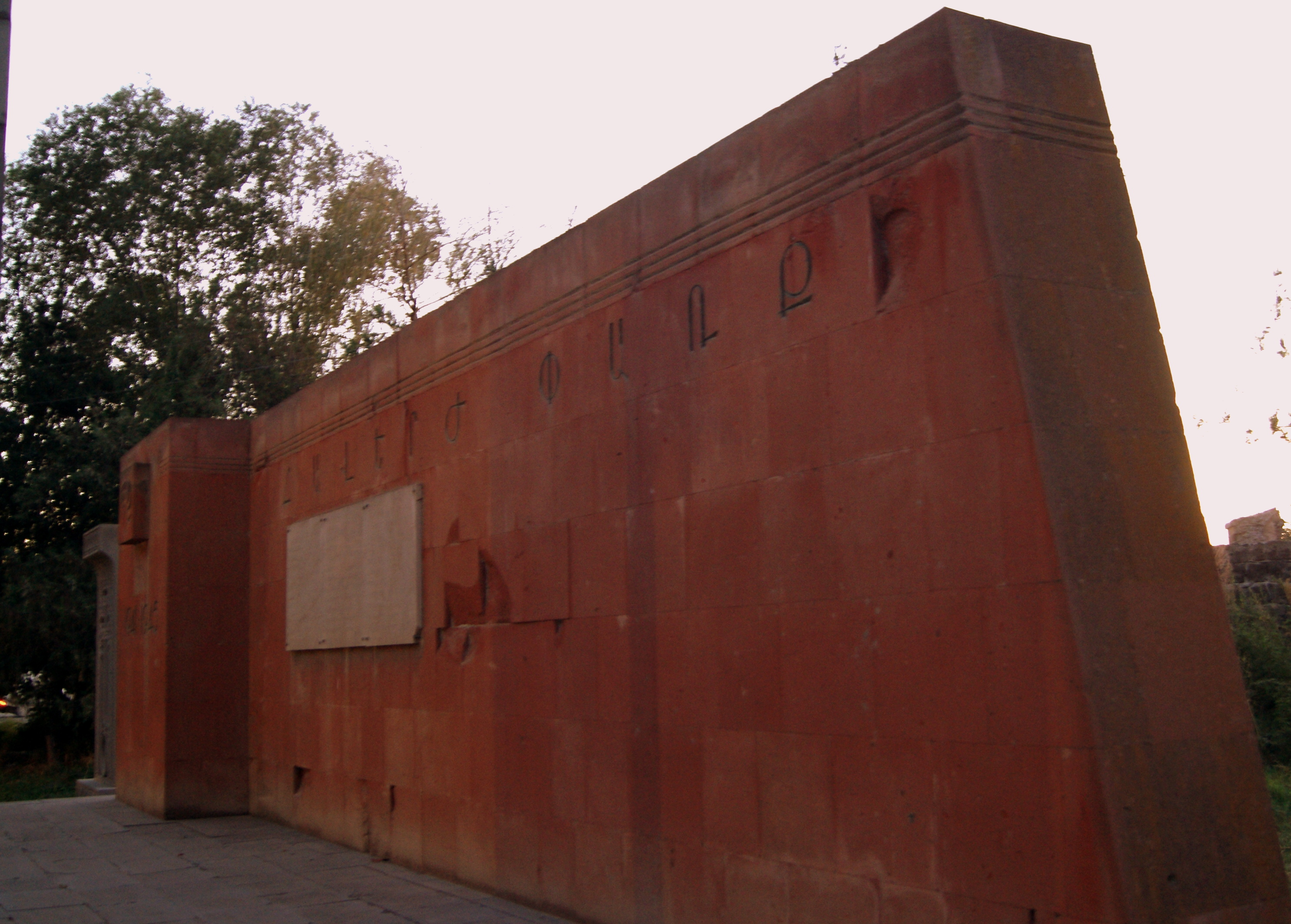
Monument for WW2

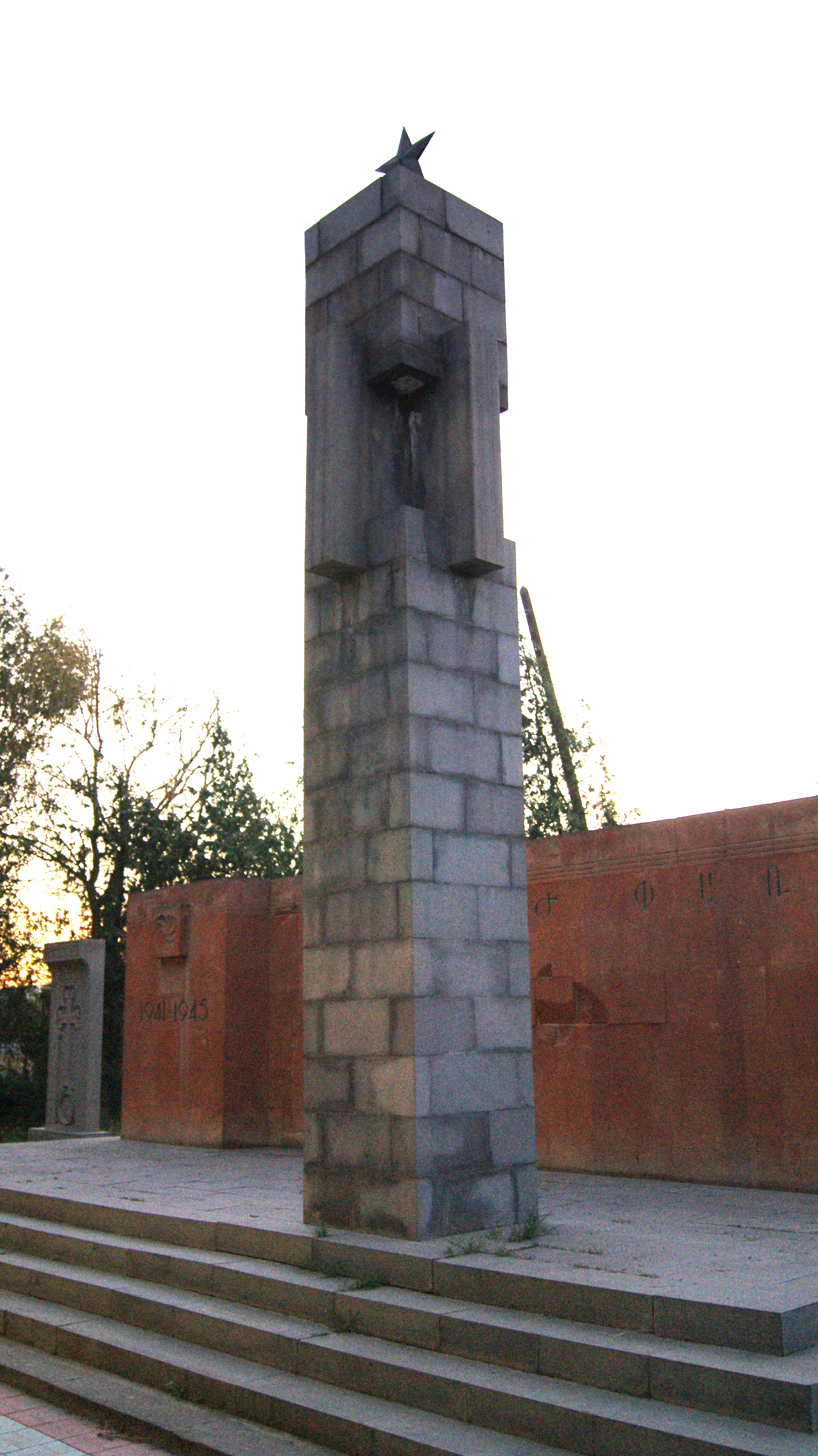
Monument for WW2

== Notable people ==
- Alla Mikayelyan, Olympic cross-country skier
