= Sergei Gonchar =

Russian ice hockey player (born 1974)

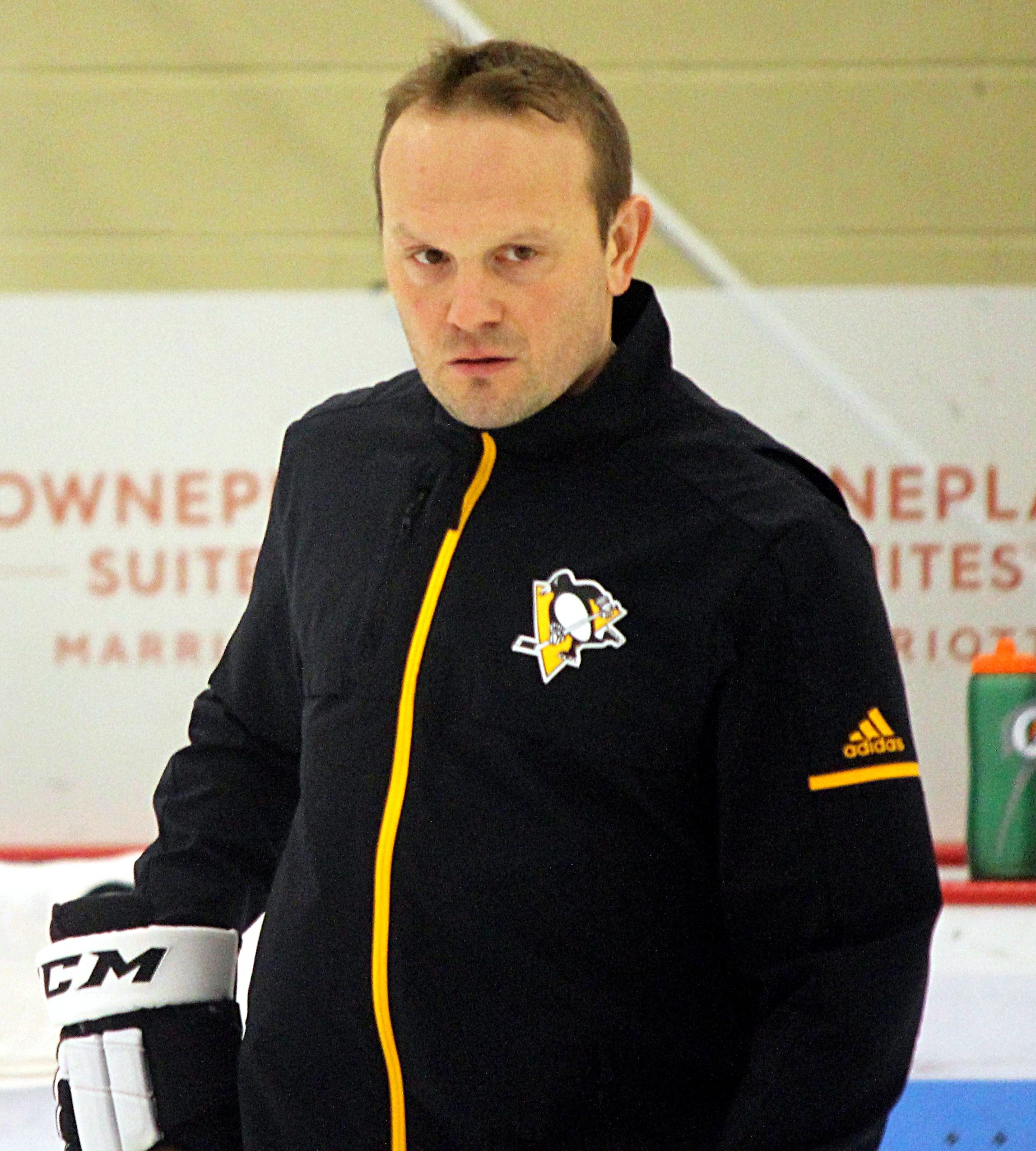
- Gonchar in March 2018
- Born: 13 April 1974 (age 52) Chelyabinsk, Russian SFSR, Soviet Union
- Height: 6 ft 2 in (188 cm)
- Weight: 210 lb (95 kg; 15 st 0 lb)
- Position: Defence
- Shot: Left
- Played for: Traktor Chelyabinsk; Dynamo Moscow; Washington Capitals; Lada Togliatti; Boston Bruins; Metallurg Magnitogorsk; Pittsburgh Penguins; Ottawa Senators; Dallas Stars; Montreal Canadiens
- National team: Russia
- NHL draft: 14th overall, 1992; Washington Capitals
- Playing career: 1991–2015

Sergei Viktorovich Gonchar (Russian: Серге́й Ви́кторович Гонча́р, IPA: [sʲɪrˈɡʲej ˈvʲiktərəvʲɪdʑ ɡɐnʲˈtɕar]; born 13 April 1974) is a Russian former professional ice hockey player who was most recently a Defensive Development Coach with the Vancouver Canucks. He formerly served as an assistant coach for the Pittsburgh Penguins, and has previously played for the Washington Capitals, Boston Bruins, Pittsburgh Penguins (with whom he won the Stanley Cup in 2009), Ottawa Senators, Dallas Stars and the Montreal Canadiens between 1995 and 2015.

== Playing career ==
Gonchar began his professional career in 1991 with Traktor Chelyabinsk in the Soviet Championship League. He also played two seasons for Dynamo Moscow.

Gonchar was the first-round pick, 14th overall, of the Washington Capitals in the 1992 NHL entry draft. He began his North American career in 1994, suiting up in two playoff games for the Capitals' American Hockey League (AHL) affiliate, the Portland Pirates. He continued with Portland in 1994–95 before making his NHL debut with the Capitals on 7 February 1995, against the Buffalo Sabres. He appeared in 31 games total during the lockout-shortened 1994–95 season. The following year, in his first full-length campaign in the NHL, Gonchar tallied 41 points, showing his potential as an effective offensive defenceman.

In the 1998–99 season, Gonchar became the first Russian defenceman to score over 20 goals in the regular season. The following season, Gonchar broke the 50-point mark for the first time in his career. He also finished in fifth place in Norris Trophy voting as the NHL's best defenceman.

After 57- and 67-point (tied for a career high) seasons in 2000–01 and 2002–03 respectively, Gonchar was named to the second All-Star team both seasons.

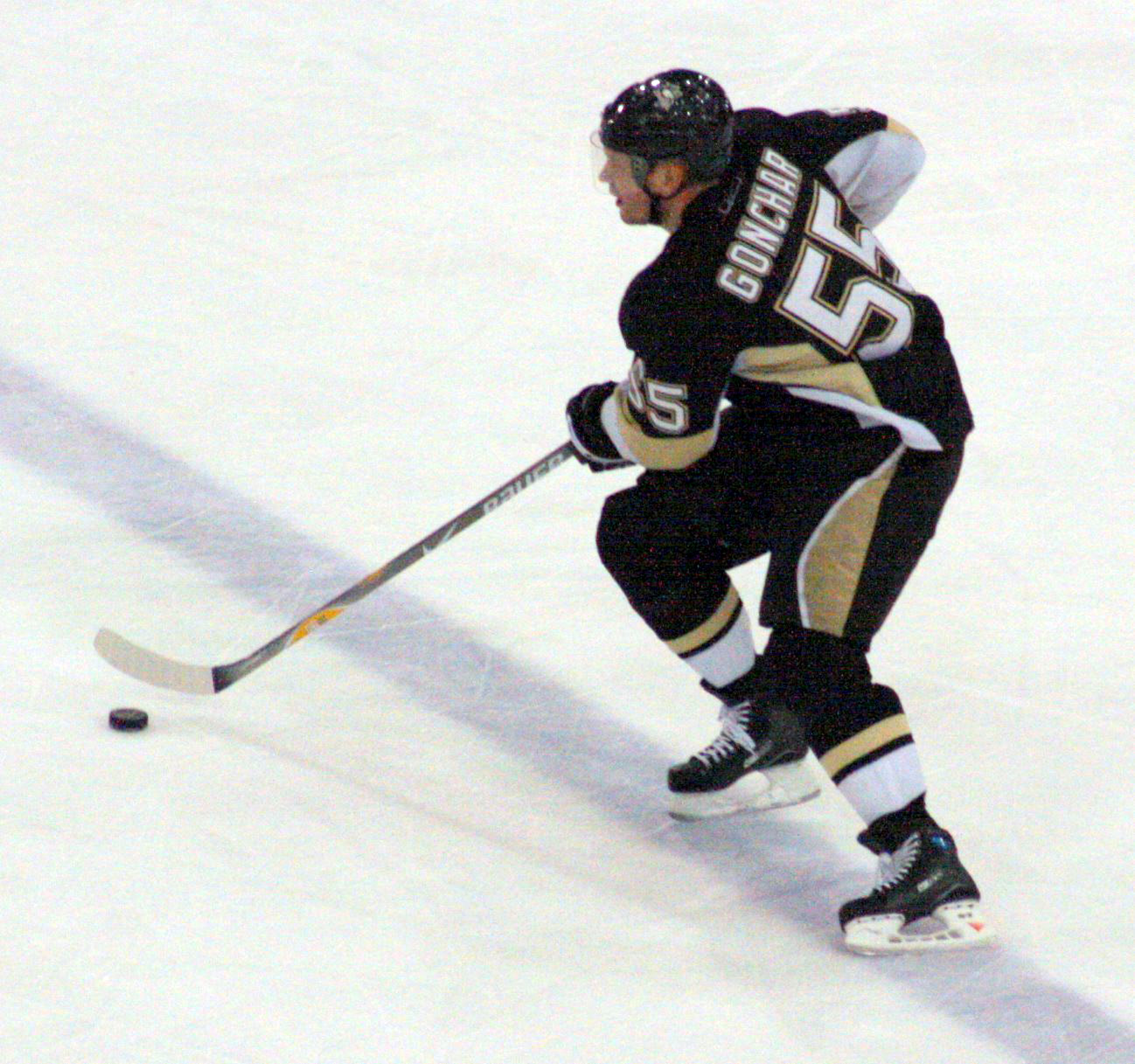
Gonchar in action with Pittsburgh

On 3 March 2004, in his tenth season with the Capitals, Gonchar was traded to the Boston Bruins in exchange for Shaone Morrisonn and two draft picks. Finishing the season with Boston, he amassed 58 points, leading all NHL defencemen. Between 2000 and 2004, Gonchar recorded more points than any other defenceman, with 74 goals and 241 points.

During the 2004–05 NHL lockout, Gonchar returned to Russia to play for Metallurg Magnitogorsk, where he played with future Pittsburgh Penguins teammates Petr Sýkora and Evgeni Malkin. After the lockout, Gonchar signed a five-year, $25 million deal with the Penguins on 4 August 2005. In 2006–07, his second season with Pittsburgh, Gonchar tied a career-high with 67 points. In addition to his on-ice duties for the Penguins, Gonchar housed rookie Evgeni Malkin when he first arrived from Russia in October 2006.

The following season, Gonchar helped lead the Penguins, with offensive superstars Sidney Crosby and Evgeni Malkin, to the 2008 Stanley Cup Final, the franchise's first finals appearance since 1992. After a 65-point regular season (the eighth 50-plus point season of his career), Gonchar added 14 points in 20 playoff games as the Penguins eventually lost in the finals to the Detroit Red Wings. Gonchar placed fourth in Norris Trophy voting, tying his best-ever placing for the league's best defenceman.

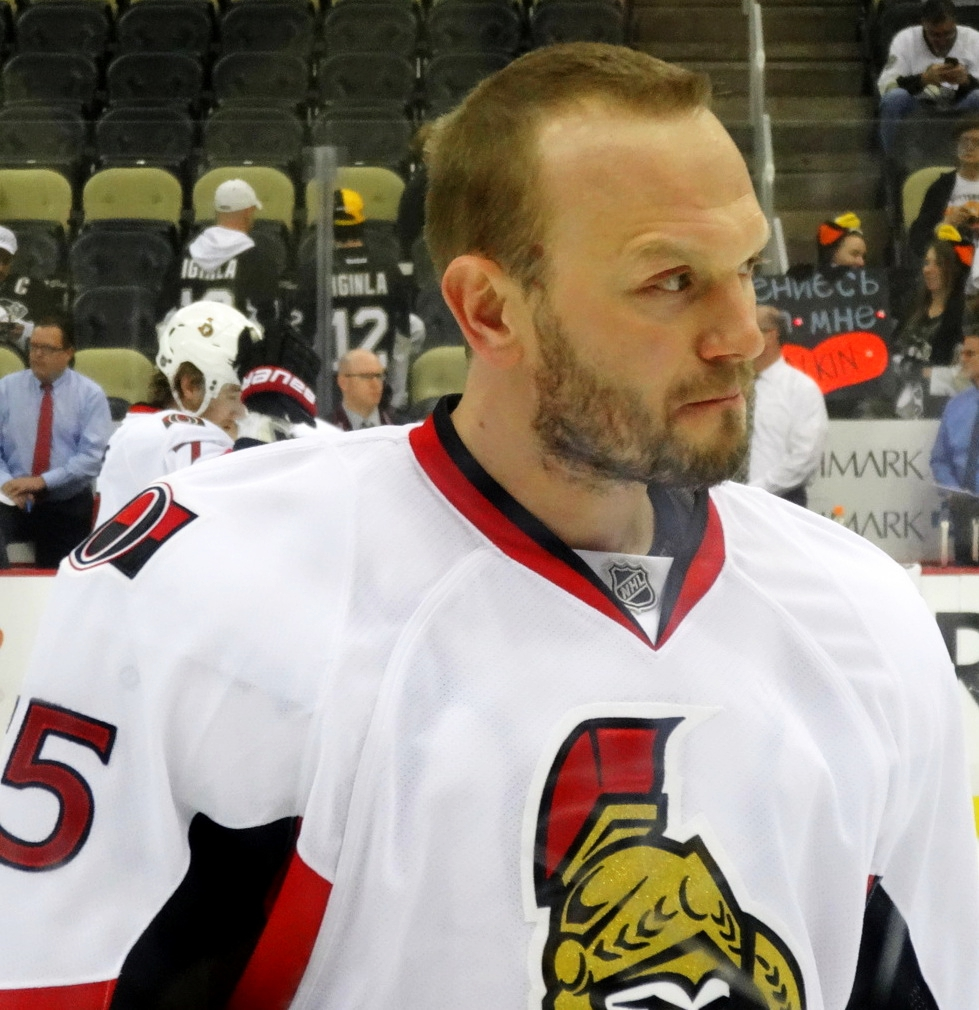
Gonchar with the Ottawa Senators in May 2013

During the first game of the 2008–09 pre-season, Gonchar was hit into the boards by David Kočí in a game against the Tampa Bay Lightning, dislocating his shoulder. It was reported that he would miss four to six months after opting for arthroscopic surgery. While both Gonchar and defense partner Brooks Orpik claimed the hit was late, well after Gonchar had completed a pass, it was judged by Penguins' head coach Michel Therrien to be a clean hit and that Kočí had simply "finished his check". With the Penguins struggling to make the playoffs, Gonchar returned to play his first game of the season on 14 February 2009, against the Toronto Maple Leafs after being sidelined for 21 weeks. He played in the final 25 games of the regular season and tallied 19 points, helping the Penguins into the 2009 playoffs as the Eastern Conference's fourth seed. However, playing in game four of the conference semi-finals against the Washington Capitals, Gonchar suffered a serious knee injury with a knee on knee hit by Alexander Ovechkin . Despite being initially expected to be out for several weeks and possibly the remainder of the playoffs, Gonchar returned for game seven of the series. Gonchar and the Penguins went on to win the Stanley Cup in seven games, facing the Detroit Red Wings for the second consecutive year. After winning, he revealed he had been playing with a partially torn medial collateral ligament (MCL).

Gonchar was sidelined with injuries again for a total of 20 games in the 2009–10 season. Despite missing time, he went on to record his ninth 50-point season in the past 10 seasons, besting Nicklas Lidström's eight. He also had his 11th season with ten goals or more, tying Sergei Zubov for the most 10+ goal seasons among Russian defencemen. Gonchar finished the season third in points-per-game average among defencemen (behind Norris Trophy nominees Mike Green and Duncan Keith). He set an NHL record on 2 March 2010, by scoring his 200th NHL goal, making him the first Russian defenceman to ever do so.

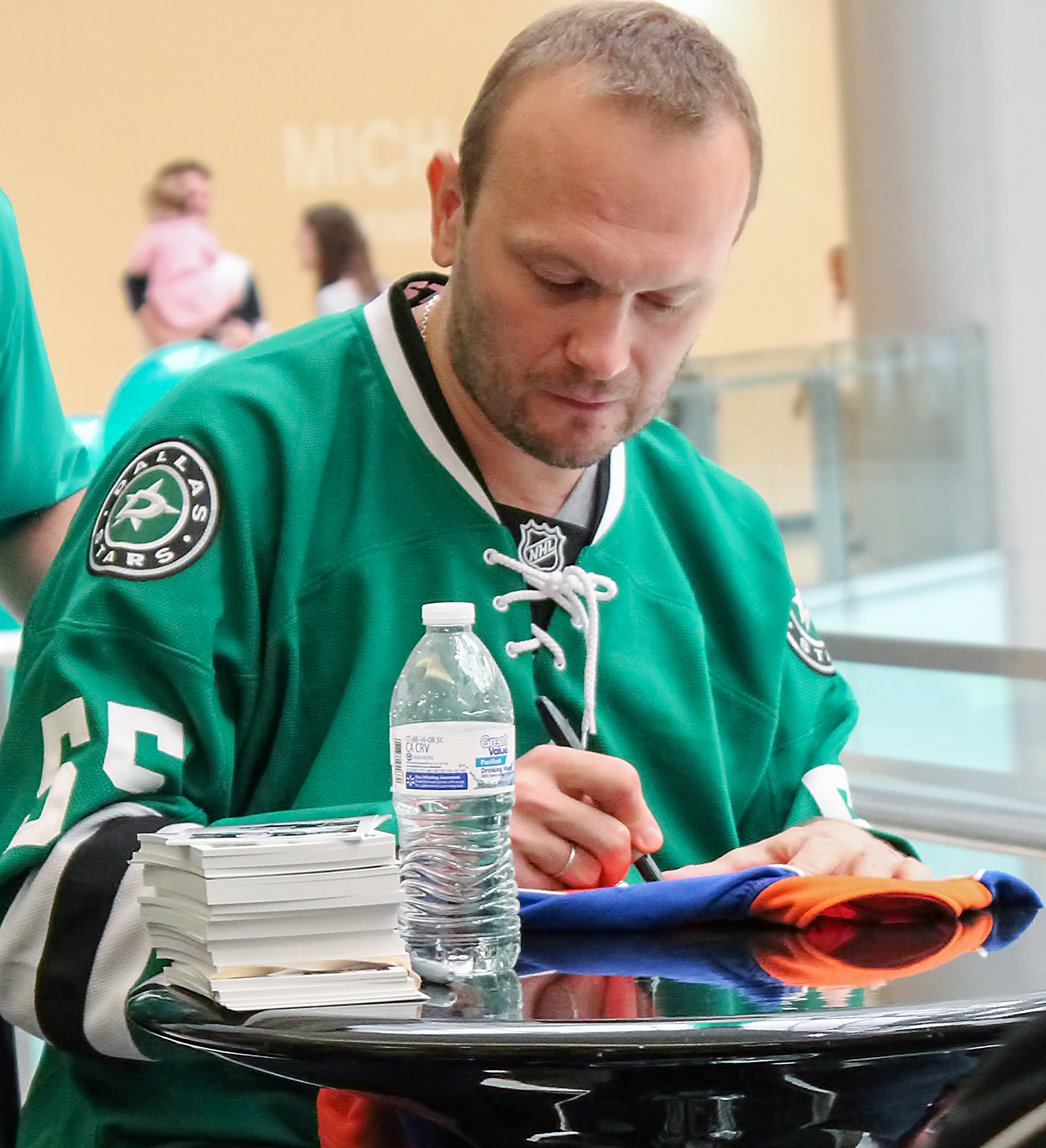
Gonchar signs autographs at Galleria Dallas in 2014, during his tenure with the Dallas Stars

From the 2000–01 season to the 2009–10 season, Gonchar tallied exactly 500 points, which was second among NHL defencemen only to Nicklas Lidström's 550. Gonchar was also second among NHL defencemen in assists during that span with 372 assists, behind Lidström's 434. He led the League in goals by a defenceman during that span, with 128. Rob Blake was second with 119 goals, while Lidström had 116. Gonchar led the NHL in points-per-game average among NHL defencemen during that span, scoring at 0.80 points per game to Lidström's 0.76 points per game. He also led the league in goals created per game among NHL defencemen with 0.27 to Al MacInnis's 0.26 and Lidström's 0.25. In fact, since his first NHL season in 1995, only Lidström scored more points among defencemen — Lidström tallied 889 points in that time, while Gonchar had 684.

On 1 July 2010, Gonchar signed a three-year, $16 million contract with the Ottawa Senators. The deal included a no-trade clause. During the 2012–13 NHL lockout, Gonchar returned to his native Russia to play with the Kontinental Hockey League (KHL)'s Metallurg Magnitogorsk. He was traded on 7 June 2013, to the Dallas Stars in exchange for a conditional sixth-round pick in 2013. On 8 June 2013, Gonchar signed a two-year, $10 million contract with the Stars. The following year, on 11 November 2014, Gonchar was again traded, this time to the Montreal Canadiens for left winger Travis Moen.

On 15 May 2015, it was announced by Canadiens' GM Marc Bergevin, that Gonchar would not return to the Montreal Canadiens the next season. Gonchar remained un-signed over the summer, and accepted an invitation to return to the Pittsburgh Penguins' training camp on a try-out basis on 14 August 2015. At the conclusion of training camp and during the pre-season, Gonchar was released by the Penguins on 3 October 2015. Despite his accomplishments as a player, he has not made the Hockey Hall of Fame, with one journalist speculating in 2024 that Russian-born players such as Gonchar were having a harder time being inducted due to the ongoing invasion of Ukraine.

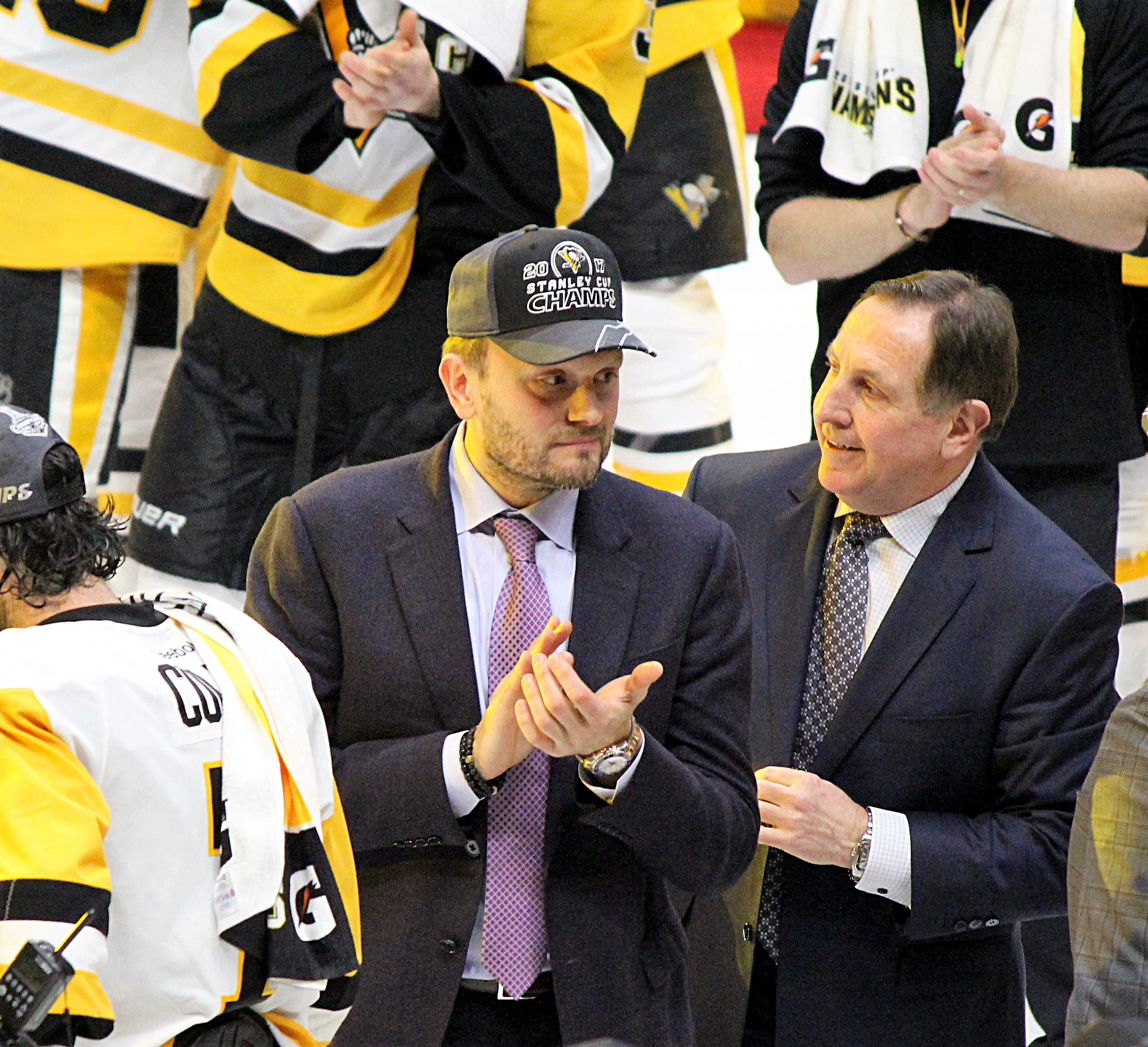
Gonchar and fellow Penguins assistant coach Jacques Martin celebrate winning the Stanley Cup in 2017

== Coaching career ==
Gonchar signalled the end of his professional playing career in accepting a development coaching position within the Pittsburgh Penguins organization on 27 October 2015. Gonchar aided the Penguins defensive unit in back to back Stanley Cup championships in 2016 and 2017, resulting in promotion to a full time assistant on July 12, 2017.

On August 12, 2020, it was announced that Gonchar's contract, along with those of fellow assistant coaches Mark Recchi and Jacques Martin, would not be renewed for the next season. The decision came following the team's loss to the Montreal Canadiens in a best-of-five qualifying round for the 2019-2020 Stanley Cup Playoffs.

On January 22, 2023, the Vancouver Canucks announced the hiring of Sergei Gonchar as a Defensive Development Coach. The decision came alongside the hiring of Rick Tocchet as Head Coach and Adam Foote as Assistant Coach. The Canucks released the following statement about Foote and Gonchar's hiring, "We are also excited about the additions of Adam Foote and Sergei Gonchar to our coaching staff. Both individuals enjoyed long, successful playing careers as NHL defenceman and together provide a wide range of expertise on both sides of the puck. Tocchet, Foote, and Gonchar all bring a championship pedigree to the organization and we look forward to welcoming them to Vancouver."

== Awards and achievements ==
- 1997-1998 NHL Playoffs Most Goals by Defenseman (7)
- 2001-2002 NHL Most Goals by Defenseman (26), NHL Most Points by Defenseman (59)
- 2002-2003 NHL Most Goals by Defenseman (18)
- 2003-2004 NHL Most Assists by Defenseman (47), NHL Most Points by Defenseman (58)
- 2006-2007 NHL Most Assists by Defenseman (54)
- Played in the NHL All-Star Game in 2001, 2002, 2003, 2004 and 2008
- Named to the NHL second All-Star team in 2002 and 2003
- Won the Stanley Cup with the Pittsburgh Penguins in 2009 as a player, and in both 2016 and 2017 as a development coach.

== International play ==
Medal record

Representing Russia

Men's ice hockey

Olympic Games
Silver medal – second place	1998 Nagano	
Bronze medal – third place	2002 Salt Lake City	

World Championships
Silver medal – second place	2010 Germany	
Bronze medal – third place	2007 Russia	

Gonchar is a two-time Olympic medal-winner with Russia. He earned a silver medal at the 1998 Games and a bronze medal at the 2002 Games.

Gonchar met his future wife, Xenia Smetanenko, then a figure skater for Armenia, at the 1998 Nagano Olympic Games.

In addition, Gonchar also competed in the 1993 World Junior Championship, two World Cups and three World Championships.

== Career statistics ==
=== Regular season and playoffs ===
			Regular season					Playoffs
Season	Team	League	GP	G	A	Pts	PIM	GP	G	A	Pts	PIM
1990–91	Mechel Chelyabinsk	USSR-2	2	0	0	0	0	—	—	—	—	—
1991–92	Traktor Chelyabinsk	CIS	31	1	0	1	6	—	—	—	—	—
1991–92	Mechel Chelyabinsk	CIS-2	2	0	0	0	2	—	—	—	—	—
1992–93	Dynamo Moscow	IHL	31	1	3	4	70	10	0	0	0	12
1992–93	Dynamo–2 Moscow	RUS-2	3	2	0	2	4	—	—	—	—	—
1993–94	Dynamo Moscow	IHL	44	4	5	9	36	10	0	3	3	14
1993–94	Portland Pirates	AHL	—	—	—	—	—	2	0	0	0	0
1994–95	Portland Pirates	AHL	61	10	32	42	67	—	—	—	—	—
1994–95	Washington Capitals	NHL	31	2	5	7	22	7	2	2	4	2
1995–96	Washington Capitals	NHL	78	15	26	41	60	6	2	4	6	4
1996–97	Washington Capitals	NHL	57	13	17	30	36	—	—	—	—	—
1997–98	Lada Togliatti	RSL	7	3	2	5	4	—	—	—	—	—
1997–98	Washington Capitals	NHL	72	5	16	21	66	21	7	4	11	30
1998–99	Washington Capitals	NHL	53	21	10	31	57	—	—	—	—	—
1999–00	Washington Capitals	NHL	73	18	36	54	52	5	1	0	1	6
2000–01	Washington Capitals	NHL	76	19	38	57	70	6	1	3	4	2
2001–02	Washington Capitals	NHL	76	26	33	59	58	—	—	—	—	—
2002–03	Washington Capitals	NHL	82	18	49	67	52	6	0	5	5	4
2003–04	Washington Capitals	NHL	56	7	42	49	44	—	—	—	—	—
2003–04	Boston Bruins	NHL	15	4	5	9	12	7	1	4	5	4
2004–05	Metallurg Magnitogorsk	RSL	40	2	17	19	57	4	1	1	2	6
2005–06	Pittsburgh Penguins	NHL	75	12	46	58	100	—	—	—	—	—
2006–07	Pittsburgh Penguins	NHL	82	13	54	67	72	5	1	3	4	2
2007–08	Pittsburgh Penguins	NHL	78	12	53	65	66	20	1	13	14	8
2008–09	Pittsburgh Penguins	NHL	25	6	13	19	26	22	3	11	14	12
2009–10	Pittsburgh Penguins	NHL	62	11	39	50	49	13	2	10	12	4
2010–11	Ottawa Senators	NHL	67	7	20	27	20	—	—	—	—	—
2011–12	Ottawa Senators	NHL	74	5	32	37	55	7	1	3	4	6
2012–13	Metallurg Magnitogorsk	KHL	37	3	26	29	40	—	—	—	—	—
2012–13	Ottawa Senators	NHL	45	3	24	27	26	10	0	6	6	14
2013–14	Dallas Stars	NHL	76	2	20	22	20	6	0	0	0	4
2014–15	Dallas Stars	NHL	3	0	1	1	2	—	—	—	—	—
2014–15	Montreal Canadiens	NHL	45	1	12	13	16	—	—	—	—	—
NHL totals			1,301	220	591	811	981	141	22	68	90	102

=== International ===
Year	Team	Event	GP	G	A	Pts	PIM
1992	Russia	EJC	6	1	4	5	8
1993	Russia	WJC	7	0	2	2	10
1996	Russia	WCH	4	2	2	4	2
1998	Russia	OLY	6	0	2	2	0
2000	Russia	WC	6	1	0	1	2
2002	Russia	OLY	6	0	0	0	2
2004	Russia	WCH	4	1	2	3	6
2006	Russia	OLY	8	0	2	2	8
2007	Russia	WC	9	1	4	5	4
2010	Russia	OLY	4	1	0	1	2
2010	Russia	WC	5	0	4	4	0
Senior totals			52	6	16	22	26

== See also ==
- List of NHL players with 1,000 games played

Awards and achievements
Preceded by Trevor Halverson	Washington Capitals first-round draft pick 1992	Succeeded by Brendan Witt
