= Armenia at the 1994 Winter Olympics =

- IOC code: ARM
- NOC: National Olympic Committee of Armenia
- Website: www.armnoc.am (in Armenian)

in Lillehammer
- Competitors: 2 in 1 sport
- Flag bearer: Arsen Harutyunyan (alpine skiing)
- Medals: Gold 0 Silver 0 Bronze 0 Total 0

Winter Olympics appearances (overview)
- 1994; 1998; 2002; 2006; 2010; 2014; 2018; 2022; 2026; 2030

Other related appearances
- Soviet Union (1956–1988); Unified Team (1992)

Armenia sent a delegation to compete at the 1994 Winter Olympics in Lillehammer, Norway from 12–27 February 1994. This was Armenia's first time competing at the Winter Olympic Games as an independent nation. The Armenian delegation consisted of two bobsledders, the Armenian-Americans Ken Topalian and Joe Almasian. They competed as a team in the two-man competition, where they finished in 36th place.

== Background ==
Armenia became an independent nation again following the dissolution of the Soviet Union in 1991. The National Olympic Committee of Armenia was recognized by the International Olympic Committee on 31 December 1992. The Lillehammer games were Armenia's first as an independent nation, they have gone on to participate in every Summer and Winter Olympics since. The 1994 Winter Olympics were held from 12–27 February 1994, a total of 1,737 athletes took part, representing 67 National Olympic Committees. The Armenian delegation to Lillehammer consisted of two bobsledders, Ken Topalian and Joe Almasian.

== Competitors ==
The following is the list of number of competitors in the Games.

Sport	Men	Women	Total
Bobsleigh	2	–	2
Total	2	0	2

== Bobsleigh ==
Ken Topalian was 30 years old at the time of the Lillehammer Games, and is from Pawtucket, Rhode Island. Joe Almasian was 26 years old at the time, and was born in Framingham, Massachusetts. They were friends through the Armenian Youth League, neither had ever been to Armenia. The two-man bobsleigh competition was held over two days, 19–20 February, with two runs being held on each day; the sum of all four run times was used to determine final placement. On the first day, the Armenian sled posted times of 54.85 seconds and 55.03 seconds. Overnight, they were in 37th place out of 43 competing teams. The next day, their run times were 54.92 seconds and 55.01 seconds This made their total time for the competition 3 minutes and 39.81 seconds, which put them in 36th position. The gold and silver medals were won by Swiss sleds, and the bronze was taken by an Italian team.

Athlete	Event	Final					
Athlete	Event	Run 1	Run 2	Run 3	Run 4	Total	Rank
Joe Almasian; Ken Topalian	Two-man	54.85	55.03	54.92	55.01	3:39.81	36
