= Armenia at the 2018 Winter Olympics =

- Flag of Armenia
- IOC code: ARM
- NOC: Armenian Olympic Committee
- Website: www.armnoc.am/eng

in Pyeongchang, South Korea 9–25 February 2018
- Competitors: 3 (2 men and 1 woman) in 2 sports
- Flag bearer (opening): Mikayel Mikayelyan
- Flag bearer (closing): Mikayel Mikayelyan
- Medals: Gold 0 Silver 0 Bronze 0 Total 0

Winter Olympics appearances (overview)
- 1994; 1998; 2002; 2006; 2010; 2014; 2018; 2022; 2026

Other related appearances
- Soviet Union (1956–1988); Unified Team (1992)

Armenia sent a delegation to compete at the 2018 Winter Olympics in Pyeongchang, South Korea, from 9–25 February 2018. This marked the nation's seventh appearance at a Winter Olympics as an independent country. The Armenian delegation consisted of three athletes, two in cross-country skiing and one in alpine skiing. The team's highest finish in any event was a 42nd place mark by Ashot Karapetyan in the alpine skiing men's slalom event.

== Background ==
The First Republic of Armenia was a short-lived country and did not participate in any Olympic Games. Following the dissolution of the Soviet Union, Armenia became an independent nation again in 1991. The National Olympic Committee of Armenia was recognized by the International Olympic Committee on 31 December 1992. Armenia participated in their first Olympics in Lillehammer at the 1994 Winter Olympics, and has sent a delegation to every Summer and Winter Olympics since. While Armenia has won multiple medals at the Summer Olympics, they had never won a Winter Olympics medal as of the close of these Pyeongchang Olympics. The Armenian delegation consisted of three athletes, two in cross-country skiing and one in alpine skiing. Cross-country skier Sergey Mikayelyan was chosen as flag bearer for both the opening and closing ceremonies.

== Alpine skiing ==
Ashot Karapetyan was 18 years old at the time of the Pyeongchan Olympics and was making his Olympic debut. Prior to competing, he broke his only skis and was contemplating dropping out of competition. The National Olympic Committee of Armenia sent him a new pair of skis to Pyeongchan in time for his first event. On 22 February 2018, Karapetyan finished the Men's slalom ranked 42nd after placing 50th in the first race and 41st in the second race.

Athlete	Event	Run 1		Run 2		Total	
Athlete	Event	Time	Rank	Time	Rank	Time	Rank
Ashot Karapetyan	Men's slalom	1:02.47	50	1:05.61	41	2:08.08	42

== Cross-country skiing ==
Mikayel Mikayelyan was 18 years old at the time of the Pyeongchan Olympics and was making his Olympic debut. On 13 February 2018, he finished the qualification round in the men's sprint 72nd and did not advance to the next round. On 16 February 2018, he competed in men's 15 kilometre freestyle and finished 83rd out of 116 classified finishers.

Katya Galstyan was 25 years old at the time of the Pyeongchan Olympics and was competing in her second Olympics after she represented Armenia in the Sochi Olympics. Galstyan competed in the women's 10 kilometre freestyle event on 15 February 2018, finishing in a time of 30 minutes and 25 seconds, which put her in 72nd place out of 90 classified finishers.

Distance

Athlete	Event	Final		
Athlete	Event	Time	Deficit	Rank
Mikayel Mikayelyan	Men's 15 km freestyle	39.01.4	+5:17.5	83
Katya Galstyan	Women's 10 km freestyle	30.25.1	+5:24.6	72

Sprint

Athlete	Event	Qualification		Quarterfinal		Semifinal		Final	
Athlete	Event	Time	Rank	Time	Rank	Time	Rank	Time	Rank
Mikayel Mikayelyan	Men's sprint	3:37.40	72	Did not advance					

== See also ==
- Armenia at the 2018 Summer Youth Olympics
- Armenia at the 2018 Winter Paralympics
