= Ani-Matilda Serebrakian =

Armenian alpine skier (born 1989)

Ani Serebrakian (born 7 February 1989) is an alpine skier from Armenia. She competed for Armenia at the 2010 Winter Olympics. She competed in the giant slalom and slalom events.
