= Yorgo Alexandrou =

American bobsledder

Personal information
- Born: June 20, 1972 (age 54) San Jose, California
- Height: 1.90 m (6 ft 3 in)
- Weight: 110 kg (243 lb)

Sport
- Country: Armenia
- Sport: Bobsleigh
- Event: Two-man bobsleigh

Yorgo Alexandrou (also written as Jyorgos Alexandrou; born June 20, 1972, San Jose, California) is an American bobsledder. He represented Armenia at the 2002 Winter Olympics, earning 33rd place in the two-man bobsleigh event with Dan Janjigian.

He, along with Janjigian, competed in the two-man bobsleigh event at the 2002 Winter Olympics in Salt Lake City, Utah for Armenia. Originally, Janjigian's brakeman was going to be Ara Bezdjian, but he had to be replaced due to a back injury. He then recruited a weightlifting champion from Armenia, but his visa application was cancelled in the aftermath of the September 11 attacks. Despite both being American citizens and Alexandrou being of Greek descent rather than of Armenian descent, they were granted Armenian residency in order to be eligible to participate. They notably practiced on the streets of San Jose, California on a bobsled fitted with wheels, reminiscent of the famous Jamaican bobsledding team at the 1988 Winter Olympics. This was due to the lack of a proper venue that was available for them to train in as well as financial constraints. They finished in 5th place in the qualifying rounds, only qualifying in their last run. Despite garnering media attention nationally, Alexandrou and Janjigian finished 33rd in the actual event.
