= Katya Galstyan =

Armenian cross-country skier (born 1993)

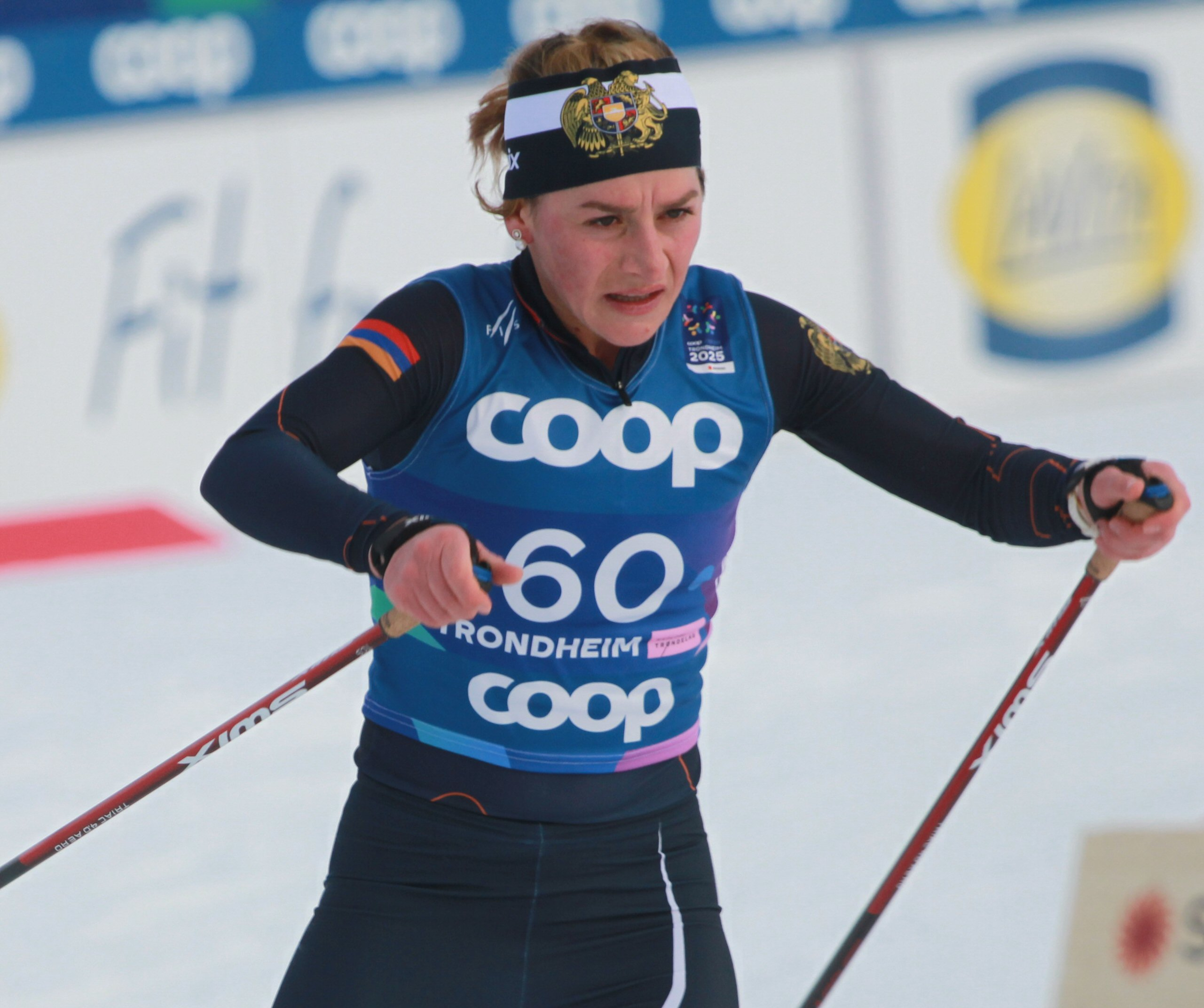

Personal information
- Born: 1 January 1993 (age 33) Gyumri, Shirak, Armenia
- Height: 163 cm (5 ft 4 in)
- Weight: 57 kg (126 lb)

Sport
- Country: Armenia
- Sport: Cross-country skiing

Katya Galstyan (Armenian: Կատյա Գալստյան, born 1 January 1993) is a cross-country skier competing for Armenia.

== Career ==
She competed for Armenia at the 2014 Winter Olympics in the 10 kilometre classical race, finishing in 64th place out of 76 competitors. She was the only woman to represent her country at the 2014 Winter Olympics and 2018 Winter Olympics.

In January 2022, Galstyan was named to Armenia's 2022 Olympic team.

== See also ==
- Armenia at the 2014 Winter Olympics
- Armenia at the 2018 Winter Olympics
