= Vanesa Rakedzhyan =

Armenian alpine skier (born 1976)

Personal information
- Nationality: Armenian
- Born: 31 July 1976 (age 48); Marseille, France

Sport
- Sport: Alpine skiing

Vanesa Rakedzhyan (born 31 July 1976) is an Armenian alpine skier. She competed in two events at the 2002 Winter Olympics.
