= Ashotsk =

Village in Shirak, Armenia

Ashotsk Աշոցք
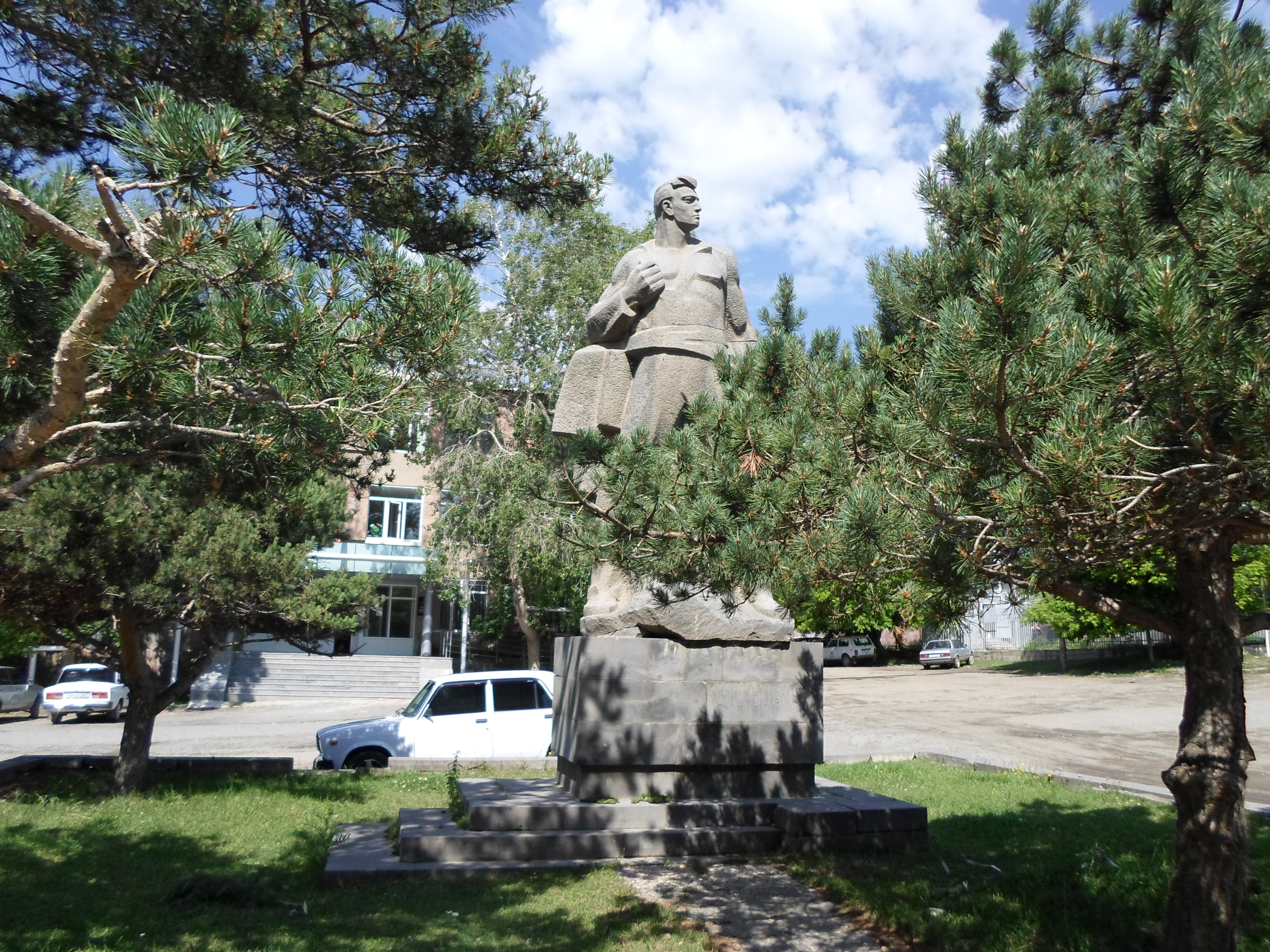
- Statue of Gukasyan (Ghukasyan)

- Location within Armenia Location within Shirak
- Coordinates: 41°02′15″N 43°51′29″E
- Country: Armenia
- Province: Shirak
- Municipality: Ashotsk
- Elevation: 1,990 m (6,530 ft)

Population (2011)
  - Total: 2,132

Ashotsk (Armenian: Աշոցք) is a village in the Ashotsk Municipality of the Shirak Province of Armenia. The Statistical Committee of Armenia reported its population was 2,482 in 2010, up from 2,378 at the 2001 census.

== Demographics ==
Historical population
Year	Pop.	±% p.a.
1873	438	—
1886	602	+2.48%
1931	916	+0.94%
1959	1,459	+1.68%
1970	1,693	+1.36%
1979	2,069	+2.25%
2001	2,378	+0.63%
2011	2,132	−1.09%

== Notable people ==
- Artur Yeghoyan, Olympic cross-country skier
