= Kristine Khachatryan =

Armenian cross-country skier (born 1989)

Kristine Khachatryan (born November 18, 1989) is an Armenian cross-country skier who has competed since 2007. She finished 76th in the 10 km event at the 2010 Winter Olympics in Vancouver, British Columbia, Canada.

At the FIS Nordic World Ski Championships 2009 in Liberec, Khachatryan finished 94th in the individual sprint event.

She had two career victories in lesser events, both in individual sprints in Armenia, in January 2010.
