= Armenia at the 2006 Winter Olympics =

- IOC code: ARM
- NOC: National Olympic Committee of Armenia
- Website: www.armnoc.am (in Armenian)

in Turin
- Competitors: 5 (4 men, 1 woman) in 3 sports
- Flag bearers: Vazgen Azrojan (opening and closing)
- Medals: Gold 0 Silver 0 Bronze 0 Total 0

Winter Olympics appearances (overview)
- 1994; 1998; 2002; 2006; 2010; 2014; 2018; 2022; 2026

Other related appearances
- Soviet Union (1956–1988); Unified Team (1992)

Armenia sent a delegation to compete at the 2006 Winter Olympics in Turin, Italy, from 10–26 February 2006. This marked the nation's fourth appearance at a Winter Olympics as an independent country. The Armenian delegation consisted of five athletes: two in cross-country skiing, two in figure skating and one in alpine skiing.

== Alpine skiing ==
Athlete	Event	Final			
Athlete	Event	Run 1	Run 2	Total	Rank
Abraham Sarkakhyan	Men's slalom	1:10.69	1:05.52	2:16.21	45

== Cross-country skiing ==
Distance

Athlete	Event	Final	
Athlete	Event	Total	Rank
Edmond Khachatryan	Men's 15 km classical	47:37.8	82
Edmond Khachatryan	Men's 50 km freestyle	DNS	
Hovhannes Sargsyan	Men's 15 km classical	50:45.7	88
Hovhannes Sargsyan	Men's 50 km freestyle	DNS	

Sprint

Athlete	Event	Qualifying		Quarterfinal		Semifinal		Final	
Athlete	Event	Total	Rank	Total	Rank	Total	Rank	Total	Rank
Edmond Khachatryan	Men's sprint	2:49.98	80	Did not advance					
Hovhannes Sargsyan	Men's sprint	2:47.68	79	Did not advance					
Edmond Khachatryan; Hovhannes Sargsyan	Men's team sprint	n/a				DNF			

== Figure skating ==
Athlete	Event	CD		SP/OD		FS/FD		Total	
Athlete	Event	Points	Rank	Points	Rank	Points	Rank	Points	Rank
Anastasia Grebenkina; Vazgen Azrojan	Ice dance	24.28	22	43.83	20	69.88	21	137.99	20

Key: CD = Compulsory Dance, FD = Free Dance, FS = Free Skate, OD = Original Dance, SP = Short Program

== See also ==
- Armenia at the 2006 Winter Paralympics
