= Samvel Gezalian =

Armenian former competitive ice dancer (born 1970)

Personal information
- Other names: Samvel Gyozalyan
- Born: 12 September 1970 (age 56) Yerevan, Armenian SSR, Soviet Union
- Height: 1.86 m (6 ft 1 in)

Figure skating career
- Country: Armenia; Germany; Belarus; Soviet Union
- Retired: 1998

Samvel (or Samuel) Gezalian (Armenian: Սամվել Գյոզալյան, Russian: Самвел Гезалян; born 12 September 1970) is an Armenian former competitive ice dancer who represented the Soviet Union, Belarus, and Armenia in international competition. With Tatiana Navka, he is the 1991 Skate America and Nations Cup champion and placed 11th at the 1994 Winter Olympics for Belarus. With Ksenia Smetanenko, he is the 1997 Golden Spin of Zagreb champion and competed at the 1998 Winter Olympics for Armenia.

== Career ==
=== Early years in skating ===
Gezalian began learning ice dancing at age ten in Odessa, where he was coached by Svetlana Rubleva and Boris Rublev. He later moved to Moscow. By 1985, he was skating with Maria Anikanova, coached by Tatiana Tarasova. In 1988, the duo joined Natalia Dubova's group following Tarasova's decision to stop coaching.

=== Partnership with Navka ===
After Anikanova ended her competitive career, Gezalian teamed up with Tatiana Navka. Representing the Soviet Union, Navka/Gezalian won gold at the 1991 Skate America and 1991 Nations Cup. Following the Soviet Union's dissolution, Navka/Gezalian chose to skate for Belarus. They placed ninth in their debut at the European and World Championships, in 1993.

In the 1993–94 season, Navka/Gezalian won silver at the 1993 Skate Canada International and placed fourth at the 1993 NHK Trophy. They competed at the 1994 Winter Olympics in Lillehammer, placing 11th, before achieving their career-best Worlds result, fifth at the 1994 World Championships in Chiba, Japan.

In 1994–95, Navka/Gezalian won silver at the 1994 NHK Trophy and went on to achieve their best European result, fourth, at the 1995 European Championships in Dortmund. Their partnership came to an end following the 1995 World Championships where they placed seventh.

=== Partnerships with Goolsbee and Smetanenko ===
Gezalian then teamed up with American-born Jennifer Goolsbee to represent Germany. They won the 1997 German Figure Skating Championships. Their partnership soon ended due to Goolsbee's citizenship problems.

Later in 1997, Gezalian teamed up with Ksenia Smetanenko to compete for his native Armenia. Placing sixth at the 1997 Karl Schäfer Memorial, they qualified a spot for Armenia at the Olympics. Smetanenko/Gezalian then won gold at the 1997 Golden Spin of Zagreb and placed 20th at the 1998 European Championships before competing at the 1998 Winter Olympics in Nagano, where they placed 24th. They retired from competition at the end of the season.

=== Post-competitive career ===
Gezalian works as a skating coach in New York City.

== Results ==
=== With Smetanenko for Armenia ===
Event	1997–1998
Winter Olympics	24th
World Championships	27th
European Championships	20th
Golden Spin of Zagreb	1st
Karl Schäfer Memorial	6th

=== With Goolsbee for Germany ===
Event	1997
German Championships	1st

=== With Navka for Belarus and the Soviet Union ===
Event	1991–92	1992–93	1993–94	1994–95
Winter Olympics			11th	
World Championships		9th	5th	7th
European Champ.		9th	10th	4th
Nations Cup	1st			
NHK Trophy		7th	4th	2nd
Skate America	1st			
Skate Canada			2nd	
Belarusian Champ.			1st	
