= Aghvan Grigoryan =

Armenian weightlifter (born 1969)

Aghvan Grigoryan (Armenian: Աղվան Գրիգորյան, born February 11, 1969) is an Armenian retired weightlifter. He competed at the 1996 Summer Olympics in the men's 99 kg division. Grigoryan was also the flag bearer for Armenia at the 1996 Olympics and is the first Olympian to bear the flag of Armenia at the Summer Olympics. He now works for the Australian Weightlifting Federation as a coach for club Phoenix in Victoria, Australia.
