= Armenia at the 2022 Winter Olympics =

- Flag of Armenia
- IOC code: ARM
- NOC: Armenian Olympic Committee
- Website: www.armnoc.am/eng

in Beijing, China 4–20 February 2022
- Competitors: 6 (3 men and 3 women) in 3 sports
- Flag bearers (opening): Tina Garabedian; Mikayel Mikayelyan
- Flag bearer (closing): Volunteer
- Medals: Gold 0 Silver 0 Bronze 0 Total 0

Winter Olympics appearances (overview)
- 1994; 1998; 2002; 2006; 2010; 2014; 2018; 2022; 2026

Other related appearances
- Soviet Union (1956–1988); Unified Team (1992)

Armenia competed at the 2022 Winter Olympics in Beijing, China, from 4 to 20 February 2022.

Armenia's team consisted of six athletes (three per gender) competing in three sports. This doubled the size of the team from 2018. Tina Garabedian and Mikayel Mikayelyan were the country's flagbearer during the opening ceremony. A volunteer served as the flagbearer during the closing ceremony.

== Competitors ==
The following is the list of number of competitors who participated at the Games per sport/discipline.

Sport	Men	Women	Total
Alpine skiing	1	0	1
Cross-country skiing	1	2	3
Figure skating	1	1	2
Total	3	3	6

== Alpine skiing ==
By meeting the basic qualification standards, Armenia qualified one male alpine skier.

Athlete	Event	Run 1		Run 2		Total	
Athlete	Event	Time	Rank	Time	Rank	Time	Rank
Harutyun Harutyunyan	Men's giant slalom	DNS		Did not advance			

== Cross-country skiing ==
Armenia qualified one male and two female cross-country skiers.

Distance

Athlete	Event	Classical		Freestyle		Final		
Athlete	Event	Time	Rank	Time	Rank	Time	Deficit	Rank
Mikayel Mikayelyan	Men's 15 km classical	—N/a				43:09.1	+5:14.3	61
Mikayel Mikayelyan	Men's 30 km skiathlon	42:09.7	37	43:08.5	47	1:25:53.7	+9:43.9	47
Katya Galstyan	Women's 10 km classical	—N/a				34:37.5	+6:31.2	74
Angelina Muradyan	Women's 10 km classical	—N/a				39:43.4	+11:37.1	94

Sprint

Athlete	Event	Qualification		Quarterfinal		Semifinal		Final	
Athlete	Event	Time	Rank	Time	Rank	Time	Rank	Time	Rank
Katya Galstyan	Women's individual	4:00.48	80	Did not advance					

== Figure skating ==
In September 2021, at the 2021 CS Nebelhorn Trophy in Oberstdorf, Germany, Armenia qualified a berth in the ice dancing event.

Athletes	Event	SD		FD		Total	
Athletes	Event	Points	Rank	Points	Rank	Points	Rank
Tina Garabedian / Simon Proulx-Sénécal	Ice dance	65.87	19 Q	101.16	16	167.03	18
