= Ksenia Smetanenko =

Personal information
- Other names: Ksenia Gonchar; Xenia Smetanenko
- Born: 26 March 1979 (age 47) Moscow, Russian SFSR, Soviet Union

Figure skating career
- Country: Armenia; Russia
- Retired: 1998

Ksenia Smetanenko, married name: Gonchar (Russian: Ксения Гончар (Сметаненко), born 26 March 1979) is a former ice dancer who competed internationally for Russia and Armenia. With Samuel Gezalian, she is the 1997 Golden Spin of Zagreb champion and competed at the 1998 Winter Olympics for Armenia. Earlier in her career, she competed for Russia with Igor Lukanin.

== Career ==
Smetanenko originally competed for Russia. With Igor Lukanin, she placed third at the 1992 Russian National Junior Championships and tenth at the 1993 World Junior Championships for Russia. They also appeared twice at the German Championships.

In 1997, Smetanenko teamed up with Samuel Gezalian and began representing Armenia. Placing sixth at the 1997 Karl Schäfer Memorial, they qualified a spot for Armenia at the Olympics. Smetanenko/Gezalian then won gold at the 1997 Golden Spin of Zagreb and placed 20th at the 1998 European Championships before competing at the 1998 Winter Olympics in Nagano, where they placed 24th. They retired from competition at the end of the season.

== Personal life ==
Smetanenko was born in Moscow. She married former professional hockey player Sergei Gonchar now assistant coach with the Vancouver Canucks, whom she met at the 1998 Winter Olympics. They have two daughters, Natalie and Victoria.

== Competitive highlights ==
=== With Gezalian for Armenia ===
International
Event	1997–98
Winter Olympics	24th
World Championships	27th
European Championships	20th
Golden Spin of Zagreb	1st
Karl Schäfer Memorial	6th

=== With Lukanin for Russia and Germany ===
International
Event	1991–92	1992–93	1995–96	1996–97
World Junior Champ.		10th		
National
Russian Junior Champ.	3rd			
German Champ.			5th	4th
