= Jim Hickey Jr. =

American bobsledder

Personal information
- Born: November 13, 1940 (age 85) Keene Valley, New York, United States

Sport
- Sport: Bobsleigh

Jim Hickey Jr. (born November 13, 1940) is an American bobsledder. He competed in the four man event at the 1972 Winter Olympics.
