= Alla Mikayelyan =

Armenian cross-country skier (born 1969)

Personal information
- Nationality: Armenian
- Born: 19 December 1969 (age 55); Ghukasavan, Soviet Union

Sport
- Sport: Cross-country skiing

Alla Mikayelyan (born 19 December 1969) is an Armenian cross-country skier. She competed in the women's 30 kilometre freestyle at the 1998 Winter Olympics. She was also the flag bearer for Armenia at the Winter Olympics.
