= Artur Yeghoyan =

Armenian cross-country skier (born 1990)

Personal information
- Nationality: Armenian
- Born: 14 September 1990 (age 35) Ashotsk, Armenia

Sport
- Sport: Cross country skiing

Artur Yeghoyan (born 14 September 1990) is an Armenian cross-country skier. He represented Armenia at the FIS Nordic World Ski Championships 2013 in Val di Fiemme, and the 2015 World Championships in Falun. He competed at the 2014 Winter Olympics in Sochi, in the 30 kilometre skiathlon.
