= Mikayel Mikayelyan =

Armenian cross-country skier (born 1999)

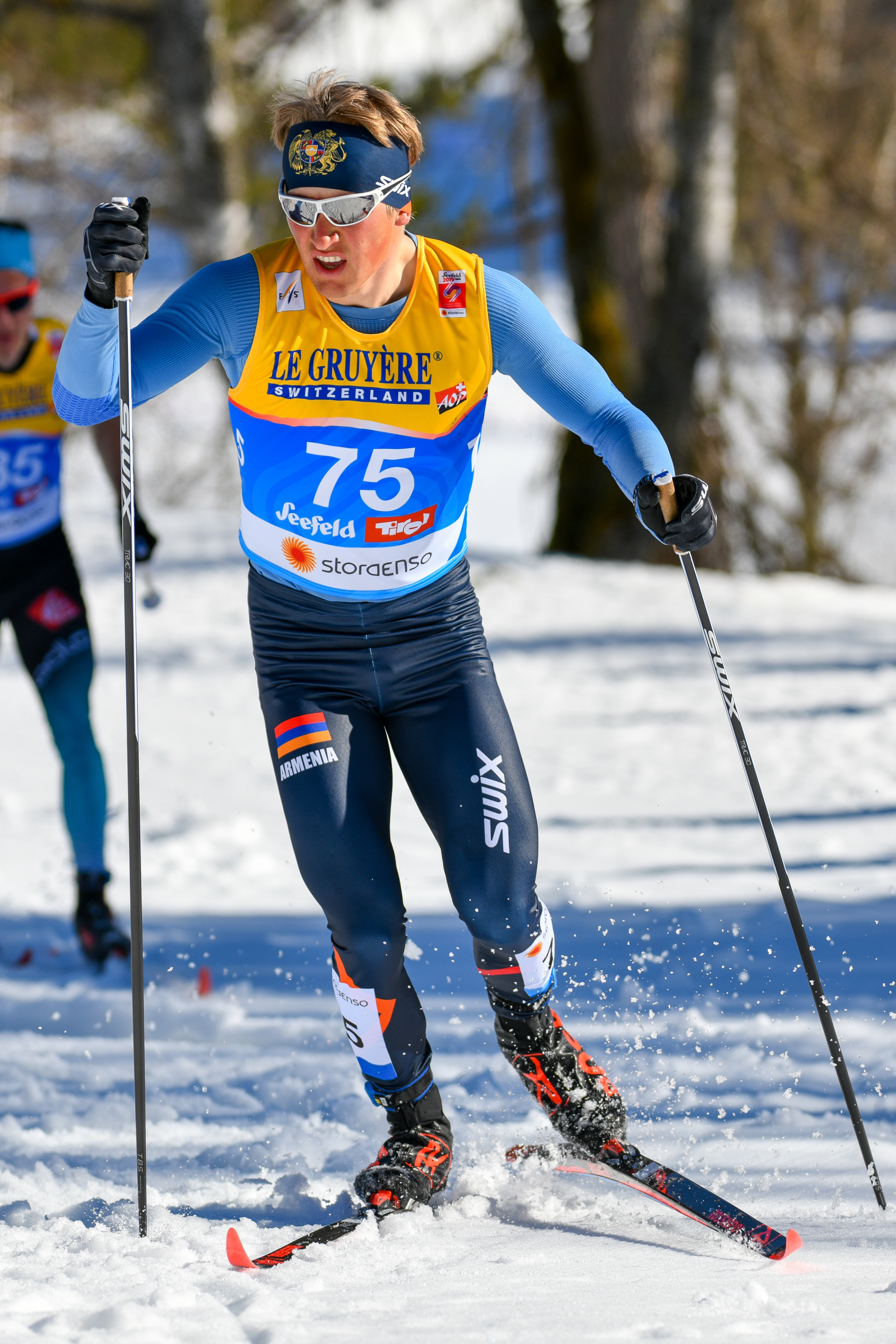
- Mikayelyan in 2019

Personal information
- Full name: Mikayel Arturi Mikayelyan
- Born: 10 July 1999 (age 26) Ashotsk, Armenia
- Height: 171 cm (5 ft 7 in)

Sport
- Sport: Skiing

Mikayel Arturi Mikayelyan (Armenian: Միքայել Արթուրի Միքայելյան; born 10 July 1999 in Ashotsk) is a cross-country skier who was the flag bearer for Armenia at the 2018 Winter Olympics Parade of Nations.

In January 2022, Mikayelyan was named to Armenia's 2022 Olympic team.
