= Sergey Mikayelyan =

Armenian cross-country skier (born 1992)

Sergey Mikayelyan Սերգեյ Միքայելյան
Personal information
- Born: April 27, 1992 (age 34)
- Height: 6 ft 0 in (183 cm)
- Weight: 161 lb (73 kg)

Sport
- Country: Armenia
- Sport: Cross-country skiing
Medal record
Men's cross-country skiing
Representing Armenia
Winter Universiade
Bronze medal – third place	2017 Almaty	10 km pursuit free

Sergey Mikayelyan (Armenian: Սերգեյ Միքայելյան; born April 27, 1992) is an Armenian cross-country skier who has competed since 2008. He finished 70th in the 15 km event at the 2010 Winter Olympics in Vancouver.

At the FIS Nordic World Ski Championships 2009 in Liberec, Mikayelyan finished 105th in the individual sprint while getting lapped in the 30 km mixed pursuit event.

He has four victories in lesser events since 2009.
