= Arsen Harutyunyan (alpine skier) =

Armenian alpine skier (born 1968)

Personal information
- Full name: Arsen Harutyunyan
- Nationality: Armenian
- Born: 16 March 1968 (age 57); Tsaghkadzor, Soviet Union

Sport
- Sport: Alpine skiing

Arsen Harutyunyan (born 16 March 1968) is an Armenian alpine skier. He competed at the 1998 Winter Olympics and the 2002 Winter Olympics. he now lives in Utah.
