= Bermuda at the 2027 Pan American Games =

- IOC code: BER
- NOC: Bermuda Olympic Association

in Lima, Peru 2027 – 2027
- Competitors: 2 in 1 sport
- Medals: Gold 0 Silver 0 Bronze 0 Total 0

Pan American Games appearances (overview)
- 1967; 1971; 1975; 1979; 1983; 1987; 1991; 1995; 1999; 2003; 2007; 2011; 2015; 2019; 2023

Bermuda is scheduled to compete at the 2027 Pan American Games in Lima, Peru from July 23 to August 8, 2027. This will be Bermuda's 16th appearance at the Pan American Games, having competed at every edition of the Games since 1967.

== Competitors ==
The following is the list of number of competitors (per gender) participating at the games per sport/discipline.

Sport	Men	Women	Total
Sailing	1	1	2
Total	1	1	1

== Sailing ==
Bermuda qualified 2 boats for a total of 2 sailors.

Athlete	Event	Opening series																		Finals				
Athlete	Event	1	2	3	4	5	6	7	8	9	10	11	12	13	14	15	16	Points	Rank	QF	SF	M / F	Points	Rank
	ILCA 7											—N/a								—N/a				
	ILCA 6											—N/a								—N/a				
