= Bermuda at the 1991 Pan American Games =

- IOC code: BER
- NOC: Bermuda Olympic Association
- Website: www.olympics.bm

in Havana 2-18 August
- Competitors: 31 in 5 sports
- Medals Ranked 27th: Gold 0 Silver 2 Bronze 0 Total 2

Pan American Games appearances (overview)
- 1967; 1971; 1975; 1979; 1983; 1987; 1991; 1995; 1999; 2003; 2007; 2011; 2015; 2019; 2023

The 11th Pan American Games were held in Havana, Cuba, from August 2 to August 18, 1991. Bermuda participated in six sports and won two silver medals.

== Results by events ==
=== Athletics ===
- Brian Wellman
- Troy Douglas
- Donna Bean
- Terry-Lynn Paynter
- Anna Eatherley
- Frederick Lottimore
- Clarence Saunders
- Michael Watson

=== Cycling ===
- Elliot Hubbard
- Clark Tear
- Karl Outerbridge
- Michael Lee
- Vance Stevens
- Kevin Tucker

=== Sailing ===
- Malcolm Smith
- Blythe Walker
- Stephen Dickinson
- Brett Wright
- Wesley Tucker
- Raymond DeSilva
- Paula Lewin

=== Swimming ===
- Jennifer Smatt
- Stanley Harris
- Christopher Flook
- Michael Cash
- Jason Krupp
- Geri Mewett
- Ian Raynor

=== Tennis ===
- Stephen Alger
- Michael Way
- William Way, Jr.

== See also ==
- Bermuda at the 1992 Summer Olympics
