= List of Bermudian records in swimming =

This is a list of national swimming records for Bermuda. These are the fastest times ever swum by a swimmer representing the country. These records are kept by Bermuda's national swimming federation: the Bermuda Amateur Swimming Association (BASA).

BASA keeps records for both for males and females, for long course (50m) and short course (25m) events. Records are kept in the following events (by stroke):

- freestyle: 50, 100, 200, 400, 800 and 1500;
- backstroke: 50, 100 and 200;
- breaststroke: 50, 100 and 200;
- butterfly: 50, 100 and 200;
- individual medley: 100 (25m only), 200 and 400;
- relays: 4x50 free, 4x100 free, 4x200 free (50m only), 4x50 medley, and 4 × 100 medley.

== Long course (50m) ==
=== Men ===
Event	Time		Name	Club	Date	Meet	Location	Ref
50 m freestyle	22.47	h	Roy-Allan Burch	Bermuda	2 August 2012	Olympic Games	London, Great Britain	
100 m freestyle	50.26		Roy-Allan Burch	Bermuda	26 July 2014	Commonwealth Games	Glasgow, United Kingdom	
100 m freestyle	49.29	not ratified	Roy-Allan Burch	Bermuda	31 July 2013	Nico Sapio Trophy	Genoa, Italy	
200 m freestyle	1:54.21		Brandon Adkins	Baylor Swim Club	6 June 2024	Synergy Dryland Summer Sizzler	Nashville, United States	
400 m freestyle	4:07.78		Thomas Cechini	Bermuda	22 April 2025	CARIFTA Championships	Couva, Trinidad and Tobago	
800 m freestyle	8:41.37	†	Tyler Mazurek	Bermuda	29 June 2016	CISC	Nassau, Bahamas	
1500 m freestyle	16:23.44		Tyler Mazurek	Bermuda	29 June 2016	CISC	Nassau, Bahamas	
50 m backstroke	25.20	sf, =	Jack Harvey	Bermuda	24 July 2026	Commonwealth Games	Glasgow, United Kingdom	
50 m backstroke	25.20	h, =, #	Jack Harvey	Bermuda	13 August 2026	Pan Pacific Championships	Irvine, United States	
100 m backstroke	54.56	=	Jack Harvey	Bermuda	3 May 2025	TYR Pro Swim Series	Fort Lauderdale, United States	
100 m backstroke	54.56	=	Jack Harvey	Bermuda	31 July 2026	CAC Games	Santo Domingo, Dominican Republic	
100 m backstroke	54.51	h, #	Jack Harvey	Bermuda	12 August 2026	Pan Pacific Championships	Irvine, United States	
200 m backstroke	2:01.05	h	Jack Harvey	Bermuda	2 May 2025	TYR Pro Swim Series	Fort Lauderdale, United States	
50 m breaststroke	29.10	†, h	Julian Fletcher	Bermuda	6 August 2016	Olympic Games	Rio de Janeiro, Brazil	
100 m breaststroke	1:02.47		Julian Fletcher	Sharks SC	21 May 2016	Bermudian Championships	Devonshire Parish, Bermuda	
200 m breaststroke	2:18.77		Julian Fletcher	Trojan Swim Club	17 April 2015	Arena Pro Series	Mesa, United States	
50m butterfly	24.77	h	Roy-Allan Burch	Bermuda	17 November 2014	CAC Games	Veracruz, Mexico	
100m butterfly	54.39	b	Elijah Daley	Bermuda	30 July 2026	CAC Games	Santo Domingo, Dominican Republic	
200m butterfly	2:01.00		Elijah Daley	Bermuda	29 July 2026	CAC Games	Santo Domingo, Dominican Republic	
200m individual medley	2:05.70	b	Elijah Daley	Bermuda	28 July 2026	CAC Games	Santo Domingo, Dominican Republic	
400m individual medley	4:35.09	h	Sam Williamson	Bath University	4 April 2024	British Championships	London, United Kingdom	
4×50m freestyle relay	1:39.26		Sam Williamson (25.45); Flynn Watson-Brown; Elijah Daley; Finn Moseley	Bermuda	19 April 2022	CARIFTA Championships	Bridgetown, Barbados	
4×100m freestyle relay	3:31.17	h	Ian Raynor (53.07); Michael Cash (52.35); Craig Morbey (53.51); Geri Mewett (52.24)	Bermuda	July 1992	Olympic Games	Barcelona, Spain	
4×200m freestyle relay	8:07.69		Finn Moseley (2:04.00); Brandon Adkins; Elijah Daley; Sam Williamson	Bermuda	18 April 2022	CARIFTA Championships	Bridgetown, Barbados	
4×50m medley relay	1:54.39		Nicholas Thomson; Julian Fletcher; Nicholas Patterson; Roy-Allan Burch	Bermuda	25 June 2009	Florida Gold Coast; A Invitational	Coral Springs, United States	
4×100m medley relay	4:03.38		Stanley Harris; Chris Flook; Stephen Fahy; Geri Mewett	Bermuda	August 1994	Commonwealth Games	Victoria, Canada	

Legend: # – Record awaiting ratification by Bermuda Amateur Swimming Association; WR – World record; AM – Americas record; e – equalled existing record;
Records not set in finals: h – heat; sf – semifinal; r – relay 1st leg; rh – relay heat 1st leg; b – B final; † – en route to final mark; so – swim-off; tt – time trial

=== Women ===
Event	Time		Name	Club	Date	Meet	Location	Ref
50m freestyle	25.69	h	Emma Harvey	Bermuda	4 December 2025	U.S. Open	Austin, United States	
100m freestyle	55.89	=	Emma Harvey	USPU	16 May 2024	Atlanta Classic	Atlanta, United States	
100m freestyle	55.89	= '#'	Emma Harvey	Bermuda	22 June 2024	Bahamian Championships	Nassau, Bahamas	
200m freestyle	2:02.30	d	Elan Daley	Etobicoke	6 December 2019 (Note: by official result source; 6 December 2019 by BASA source, a typo)	U.S. Open	Atlanta, United States	
400m freestyle	4:34.90		Kiera Aitken	Bermuda	25 June 2009	Florida Gold Coast Invitational	Coral Springs, United States	
800m freestyle	9:22.19		Elan Daley	-	20 December 2019	Trillium Cup	Toronto, Canada	
1500m freestyle	18:17.46		Stephanie Myles	Edmonton Keyano S.C.	22 July 2012	Canadian Nationals	Canada	
50m backstroke	28.34	h	Emma Harvey	Bermuda	14 February 2024	World Championships	Doha, Qatar	
100m backstroke	1:01.21	h	Emma Harvey	Bermuda	30 May 2024	Mare Nostrum	Barcelona, Spain	
200m backstroke	2:16.95		Kiera Aitken	C.N. Barcelona	18 April 2009	Spanish Spring Cup 1st Division	Castellón, Spain	
50m breaststroke	33.46		Lisa Blackburn	Bermuda	25 June 2012	CISC	Savaneta, Aruba	
100m breaststroke	1:11.27	h	Lisa Blackburn	–	16 June 2012	Bermudian Championships	Bridgetown, Bermuda	
200m breaststroke	2:35.83	h	Lisa Blackburn	T2 Aquatics	29 March 2012	USA Grand Prix Meet	Indianapolis, United States	
50m butterfly	26.54		Emma Harvey	Bermuda	31 May 2026	Mare Nostrum	Barcelona, Spain	
100m butterfly	59.85		Emma Harvey	Bermuda	30 May 2025	Bermuda Championships	Pembroke Parish, Bermuda	
200m butterfly	2:26.66		Emma Harvey	Millfield	22 April 2016	-		
200m individual medley	2:24.75		Emma Harvey	Harbour Amateur	9 June 2023	Harbour Championships		
400m individual medley	5:11.83		Lisa Blackburn	Bermuda	25 June 2012	CISC	Savaneta, Aruba	
4×50m freestyle relay	1:51.44		Marleigh Howes (27.99); Taylor White; Myeisha Sharrieff; Bella Howes	Bermuda	19 April 2022	CARIFTA Championships	Bridgetown, Barbados	
4×100m freestyle relay	4:02.69		Myeisha Sharrieff (1:02.52); Bella Howes; Taylor White; Marleigh Howes	Bermuda	16 April 2022	CARIFTA Championships	Bridgetown, Barbados	
4×200m freestyle relay	9:05.42		Taylor White (2:15.40); Myeisha Sharrieff; Marleigh Howes; Bella Howes	Bermuda	18 April 2022	CARIFTA Championships	Bridgetown, Barbados	
4×50m medley relay	2:04.32		Kiera Aitken; Lisa Blackburn; Lara Loescher; Eleanor Gardner	Bermuda	25 June 2009	Florida Gold Coast Invitational	Coral Springs, United States	
4×100m medley relay	4:32.18		Rebecca Sharpe; Lisa Blackburn; Rebecca Heyliger; Ashley Yearwood	Bermuda	4 July 2013	CCCAN	San José, Costa Rica	

Legend: # – Record awaiting ratification by Bermuda Amateur Swimming Association; WR – World record; AM – Americas record; e – equalled existing record;
Records not set in finals: h – heat; sf – semifinal; r – relay 1st leg; rh – relay heat 1st leg; b – B final; † – en route to final mark; so – swim-off; tt – time trial

=== Mixed relay ===
Event	Time		Name	Club	Date	Meet	Location	Ref
4×50m freestyle relay	1:39.35		Roy-Allen Burch (22.95); Julian Fletcher; Lisa Blackburn; Rebecca Heyliger (25.78)	Bermuda	29 June 2016	CISC	Nassau, Bahamas	
4×100m freestyle relay	3:38.86	h	Benedict Parfit (52.54); Jack Harvey (51.94); Madelyn Moore (57.75); Emma Harvey (56.63)	Bermuda	29 July 2023	World Championships	Fukuoka, Japan	
4×50m medley relay								
4×100m medley relay	4:03.43		Jack Harvey (56.67); Benedict Parfit (1:08.39); Emma Harvey (1:01.13); Madelyn Moore (57.24)	Bermuda	24 June 2023	CAC Games	San Salvador, El Salvador	

Legend: # – Record awaiting ratification by Bermuda Amateur Swimming Association; WR – World record; AM – Americas record; e – equalled existing record;
Records not set in finals: h – heat; so – swim-off

== Short course (25m) ==
=== Men ===
Event	Time		Name	Club	Date	Meet	Location	Ref
50m freestyle	21.81	h	Roy-Allan Burch	Bermuda	4 December 2014	World Championships	Doha, Qatar	
100m freestyle	48.56	h	Roy-Allan Burch	Bermuda	6 December 2014	World Championships	Doha, Qatar	
200m freestyle	1:50.30		Brandon Adkins	Harbour Amateur	15 March 2024	Bermudian Championships	Devonshire Parish, Bermuda	
400m freestyle	3:59.61		Jason Mastalir	Sherbrooke	13 February 2009	Canada Eastern; Championships	Halifax, Canada	
800m freestyle	8:18.23		Jason Mastalir	Sherbrooke	12 March 2009	Canada Spring; Nationals	Toronto, Canada	
1500m freestyle	16:11.50		Jason Mastalir	Sherbrooke	24 April 2009	Provincial section meet	Quebec City, Canada	
50m backstroke	24.57		Jack Harvey	Harbour Amateur	28 November 2025	BASA Winter Age Group Championships	Hamilton, Bermuda	
100m backstroke	53.15		Jack Harvey	Harbour Amateur	30 November 2024	BASA Winter Age Group Championships	Devonshire Parish, Bermuda	
200m backstroke	1:55.97		Jack Harvey	Harbour Amateur	1 December 2024	BASA Winter Age Group Championships	Devonshire Parish, Bermuda	
50m breaststroke	28.33	h, †	Julian Fletcher	Bermuda	6 December 2016	World Championships	Windsor, Canada	
100m breaststroke	1:01.26		Elija Daley	University Of Toronto	19 February 2026	OUA Championships	Toronto, Canada	
200m breaststroke	2:16.25	h	Julian Fletcher	Bermuda	5 December 2014	World Championships	Doha, Qatar	
50m butterfly	24.15		Elija Daley	Etobicoke	16 December 2023	Ontario Junior International	Toronto, Canada	
100m butterfly	52.56		Elija Daley	University Of Toronto	12 March 2026	U SPORTS Championships	Markham, Canada	
200m butterfly	1:57.32		Elija Daley	University Of Toronto	14 March 2026	U SPORTS Championships	Markham, Canada	
100m individual medley	55.24		Elija Daley	University Of Toronto	17 October 2026	Toronto vs McMaster	Toronto, Canada	
200m individual medley	1:58.91		Elija Daley	University Of Toronto	13 March 2026	U SPORTS Championships	Markham, Canada	
400m individual medley	4:20.50		Sam Williamson	Bath University	15 December 2023	Swim England National Winter Championships	Sheffield, United Kingdom	
4×50m freestyle relay	1:36.88		Ronald Cowen; Graham Smith; Michael O'Connor; Roy-Allan Burch	Bermuda	1 July 2003	Island Games	Guernsey	
4×100m freestyle relay	3:26.99		Ian Raynor; Michael Cash; Craig Morbrey; Geri Mewett	?	21 June 1992	Bermuda Nationals	Hamilton, Bermuda	
4×50m medley relay	1:48.17		Roy-Allan Burch; Ronald Cowen; Michael O'Connor; Graham Smith	Bermuda	30 June 2003	Island Games	Guernsey	
4×100m medley relay	3:57.97		Roy-Allan Burch; Ronald Cowen; Michael O'Connor; Graham Smith	Bermuda	2 July 2003	Island Games	Guernsey	

Legend: # – Record awaiting ratification by Bermuda Amateur Swimming Association; e – equalled existing record;
Records not set in finals: h – heat; sf – semifinal; r – relay 1st leg; rh – relay heat 1st leg; b – B final; † – en route to final mark; so – swim-off; tt – time trial

=== Women ===
Event	Time		Name	Club	Date	Meet	Location	Ref
50m freestyle	25.15	h	Maddy Moore	Bermuda	20 December 2021	World Championships	Abu Dhabi, United Arab Emirates	
100m freestyle	54.87		Elan Daley	Etobicoke	13 December 2019	Ontario Junior International	Toronto, Canada	
200m freestyle	1:58.79		Elan Daley	Etobicoke	13 December 2019	Ontario Junior International	Toronto, Canada	
400m freestyle	4:20.51		Elan Daley	Etobicoke	25 October 2019	Gus Ryder Memorial Cup	Etobicoke, Canada	
800m freestyle	9:10.12		Vanessa Esposito	Club aquatique Montréal	25 April 2015	–	Quebec, Canada	
1500m freestyle	17:24.22		Stephanie Myles	Edmonton Keyano SC	16 February 2012	Western Canadian Championships	Winnipeg, Canada	
50m backstroke	27.02	h	Emma Harvey	Unattached	29 October 2026	World Championship Trials	Westmont, United States	
100m backstroke	58.01	h	Emma Harvey	Unattached	30 October 2026	World Championship Trials	Westmont, United States	
200m backstroke	2:09.09	h	Kiera Aitken	C.N. Barcelona	29 November 2009	Spanish Championships	Castellón, Spain	
50m breaststroke	32.88		Lisa Blackburn	–	23 March 2014	Bermuda		
100m breaststroke	1:11.69		Lisa Blackburn	Sharks S.C.	17 July 2013	Bermuda Nationals		
200m breaststroke	2:35.27		Jennifer Smatt	-	1 June 1992	-		
50m butterfly	26.25	h	Emma Harvey	Unattached	30 October 2026	World Championship Trials	Westmont, United States	
100m butterfly	58.62	h	Emma Harvey	Unattached	30 October 2026	World Championship Trials	Westmont, United States	
200m butterfly	2:22.70	h	Emma Harvey	Millfield	5 November 2016	South West Region Championships	Millfield, United Kingdom	
100m individual medley	1:02.32	tt	Emma Harvey	Unattached	31 October 2026	World Championship Trials	Westmont, United States	
200m individual medley	2:18.45		Elan Daley	Etobicoke	11 January 2019	Etobicoke Invitational Open A-B Swim Meet	Etobicoke, Canada	
400m individual medley	5:02.40		Lisa Blackburn	–	15 July 2013	Bermuda Nationals	Bermuda	
4×50m freestyle relay	1:46.04		Madelyn Moore; Rebecca Heyliger; Lisa Blackburn; Ashley Yearwood	–	15 July 2013	Bermuda Nationals	Bermuda	
4×100m freestyle relay	3:53.46		Madelyn Moore; Lisa Blackburn; Rebecca Heyliger; Ashley Yearwood	–	15 July 2013	Bermuda Nationals	Bermuda	
4×50m medley relay	1:58.16		Madelyn Moore; Lisa Blackburn; Rebecca Heyliger; Ashley Yearwood	–	16 July 2013	Bermuda Nationals	Bermuda	
4×100m medley relay	4:19.22		Rebecca Sharpe; Lisa Blackburn; Rebecca Heyliger; Ashley Yearwood	–	18 July 2013	Bermuda Nationals	Bermuda	

Legend: # – Record awaiting ratification by Bermuda Amateur Swimming Association; e – equalled existing record;
Records not set in finals: h – heat; sf – semifinal; r – relay 1st leg; rh – relay heat 1st leg; b – B final; † – en route to final mark; so – swim-off; tt – time trial
