= Bermuda at the 2013 World Aquatics Championships =

- Flag of Bermuda
- World Aquatics code: BER
- National federation: Bermuda Amateur Swimming Association
- Website: www.basa.bm

in Barcelona, Spain
- Competitors: 2 in 1 sports
- Medals Ranked -th: Gold 0 Silver 0 Bronze 0 Total 0

World Aquatics Championships appearances
- 1973; 1975; 1978; 1982; 1986; 1991; 1994; 1998; 2001; 2003; 2005; 2007; 2009; 2011; 2013; 2015; 2017; 2019; 2022; 2023; 2024; 2025

Bermuda competed at the 2013 World Aquatics Championships in Barcelona, Spain from 19 July to 4 August 2013.

== Swimming ==
Bermudan swimmers achieved qualifying standards in the following events (up to a maximum of 2 swimmers in each event at the A-standard entry time, and 1 at the B-standard):

Men

| Athlete | Event | Heat | | Semifinal | | Final | |
| Athlete | Event | Time | Rank | Time | Rank | Time | Rank |
|---|---|---|---|---|---|---|---|
| Roy-Allan Burch | 50 m freestyle | 22.93 | 37 | did not advance | | | |
| Roy-Allan Burch | 100 m freestyle | 50.66 | 39 | did not advance | | | |

Women

| Athlete | Event | Heat | | Semifinal | | Final | |
| Athlete | Event | Time | Rank | Time | Rank | Time | Rank |
|---|---|---|---|---|---|---|---|
| Rebecca Heyliger | 50 m freestyle | 26.86 | 45 | did not advance | | | |
| Rebecca Heyliger | 100 m freestyle | 59.50 | 57 | did not advance | | | |
