= Bermuda at the 2019 World Aquatics Championships =

- Flag of Bermuda
- World Aquatics code: BER
- National federation: Bermuda Amateur Swimming Association

in Gwangju, South Korea
- Competitors: 3 in 1 sport
- Medals: Gold 0 Silver 0 Bronze 0 Total 0

World Aquatics Championships appearances
- 1973; 1975; 1978; 1982; 1986; 1991; 1994; 1998; 2001; 2003; 2005; 2007; 2009; 2011; 2013; 2015; 2017; 2019; 2022; 2023; 2024; 2025

Bermuda competed at the 2019 World Aquatics Championships in Gwangju, South Korea from 12 to 28 July.

== Swimming ==
Bermuda entered three swimmers.

Men

| Athlete | Event | Heat | | Semifinal | | Final | |
| Athlete | Event | Time | Rank | Time | Rank | Time | Rank |
|---|---|---|---|---|---|---|---|
| Jesse Washington | 100 m freestyle | 51.67 | 69 | did not advance | | | |
| Jesse Washington | 100 m butterfly | 57.29 | 61 | did not advance | | | |

Women

| Athlete | Event | Heat | | Semifinal | | Final | |
| Athlete | Event | Time | Rank | Time | Rank | Time | Rank |
|---|---|---|---|---|---|---|---|
| Elan Daley | 100 m freestyle | 57.00 | 42 | did not advance | | | |
| Elan Daley | 200 m freestyle | 2:05.47 | 38 | did not advance | | | |
| Maddy Moore | 50 m freestyle | 26.48 | 43 | did not advance | | | |
| Maddy Moore | 50 m butterfly | 28.02 | 38 | did not advance | | | |
