= Bermuda at the 2025 World Aquatics Championships =

- Flag of Bermuda
- World Aquatics code: BER
- National federation: Bermuda Amateur Swimming Association
- Website: basa.bm

in Singapore
- Competitors: 1 in 1 sport
- Medals: Gold 0 Silver 0 Bronze 0 Total 0

World Aquatics Championships appearances
- 1973; 1975; 1978; 1982; 1986; 1991; 1994; 1998; 2001; 2003; 2005; 2007; 2009; 2011; 2013; 2015; 2017; 2019; 2022; 2023; 2024; 2025

Bermuda is competing at the 2025 World Aquatics Championships in Singapore from 11 July to 3 August 2025.

== Competitors ==
The following is the list of competitors in the Championships.

Sport	Men	Women	Total
Swimming	1	0	1
Total	1	0	1

== Swimming ==
Men

Athlete	Event	Heat		Semifinal		Final	
Athlete	Event	Time	Rank	Time	Rank	Time	Rank
Jack Harvey	50 m backstroke	25.55	40	Did not advance			
Jack Harvey	100 m backstroke	55.40	37	Did not advance			
Jack Harvey	200 m backstroke	2:01.50	32	Did not advance			
