= Bermuda at the 2003 Pan American Games =

- IOC code: BER
- NOC: Bermuda Olympic Association
- Website: www.olympics.bm

in Santo Domingo 1–17 August 2003
- Competitors: 16 in 6 sports
- Flag bearer: Antonine Jones
- Medals Ranked 24th: Gold 0 Silver 1 Bronze 0 Total 1

Pan American Games appearances (overview)
- 1967; 1971; 1975; 1979; 1983; 1987; 1991; 1995; 1999; 2003; 2007; 2011; 2015; 2019; 2023; 2027

The 14th Pan American Games were held in Santo Domingo, Dominican Republic from August 1 to August 17, 2003.

== Medals ==
=== Silver ===
===== Sailing =====
- Men's Sunfish Class: Malcolm Smith

== Results by events ==
=== Athletics ===
Track

Athlete	Event	Heat		Final	
Athlete	Event	Time	Rank	Time	Rank
Ashley Couper	Women's 1,500 m	—	—	4:20.98	7

- Brian Wellman
- Xavier James
- Tamika Williams

=== Bowling ===
- Antoine Jones
- Steven Riley
- June Dill
- Dianne Ingham

=== Cycling ===
==== Road ====
- Kris Hedges
  - Men's Road Time Trial — + 2.26 (→ 7th place)
- Geri Mewett
  - Men's Road Time Trial — + 8.49 (→ 18th place)
- Julia Hawley
  - Women's Road Time Trial — + 4.54 (→ 15th place)

=== Diving ===
- Katura Horton-Perinchief

=== Sailing ===
- Malcolm Smith
- Alexander Kirkland

=== Swimming ===
==== Men's Competition ====
Athlete	Event	Heat		Final	
Athlete	Event	Time	Rank	Time	Rank
Ronald Cowen	100 m freestyle	53.07	27	did not advance	
Ronald Cowen	200 m freestyle	1:55.48	12	DNS	—

- Kiera Aitken

== See also ==
- Bermuda at the 2004 Summer Olympics
