= Bermuda at the 2023 World Aquatics Championships =

- Flag of Bermuda
- World Aquatics code: BER
- National federation: Bermuda Amateur Swimming Association
- Website: basa.bm

in Fukuoka, Japan
- Competitors: 4 in 1 sport
- Medals: Gold 0 Silver 0 Bronze 0 Total 0

World Aquatics Championships appearances
- 1973; 1975; 1978; 1982; 1986; 1991; 1994; 1998; 2001; 2003; 2005; 2007; 2009; 2011; 2013; 2015; 2017; 2019; 2022; 2023; 2024; 2025

Bermuda is set to compete at the 2023 World Aquatics Championships in Fukuoka, Japan from 14 to 30 July.

== Swimming ==
Bermuda entered 4 swimmers.

Men

Athlete	Event	Heat		Semifinal		Final	
Athlete	Event	Time	Rank	Time	Rank	Time	Rank
Jack Harvey	100 metre backstroke	57.04	42	Did not advance			
Jack Harvey	200 metre backstroke	2:04.52	32	Did not advance			
Benedict Parfit	50 metre freestyle	23.47	62	Did not advance			
Benedict Parfit	100 metre freestyle	52.63	78	Did not advance			

Women

Athlete	Event	Heat		Semifinal		Final	
Athlete	Event	Time	Rank	Time	Rank	Time	Rank
Emma Harvey	50 metre backstroke	28.79	31	Did not advance			
Emma Harvey	100 metre backstroke	1:03.14	39	Did not advance			
Maddy Moore	50 metre freestyle	26.06	43	Did not advance			
Maddy Moore	100 metre freestyle	58.01	35	Did not advance			

Mixed

Athlete	Event	Heat		Final	
Athlete	Event	Time	Rank	Time	Rank
Benedict Parfit; Jack Harvey; Maddy Moore; Emma Harvey	4 × 100 m freestyle relay	3:38.86	24	Did not advance	
