= 2007 Pan American Games torch relay =

39-day torch run, from June 5 to July 13, 2007

- Host city: Rio de Janeiro, Brazil
- Distance: 11,000 km
- Torch bearers: 2,500
- Start date: June 5, 2007
- End date: July 13, 2007
- No. of torches: 500

The 2007 Pan American Games torch relay was a 39-day torch run, from June 5 to July 13, 2007, held prior to the 2007 Pan American Games. On June 4, the torch was lit at the torch lighting ceremony in Teotihuacán, Mexico. The flame was then taken by a Brazilian Air Force craft to Santa Cruz Cabrália, Bahia, Brazil, where the torch relay began.

The relay toured through 42 Brazilian cities - each one representing a different country in the Pan American Games. Over 2,500 torchbearers carried the flame over 11,000 kilometers. The relay originating torchbearer was Wilson Carneiro, the first Brazilian medalist at the Pan American Games, white the final torchbearer was Naiane Freire da Purificação.

== Route ==
Route Torch lighting ceremony
Day	Date	State	Cities	Representing country
1	June 5	Bahia	Santa Cruz Cabrália^{1}	Bahamas
1	June 5	Bahia	Porto Seguro	Bahamas
2	June 6	Goiás	Goiânia	Dominican Republic
3	June 7	Minas Gerais	Ouro Preto	Saint Vincent and the Grenadines
3	June 7	Minas Gerais	Belo Horizonte	Canada
4	June 8	Espírito Santo	Vitória	Costa Rica
5	June 9	Bahia	Salvador	Cuba
6	June 10	Sergipe	Canindé de São Francisco^{1}	Antigua and Barbuda
6	June 10	Sergipe	Aracaju	Antigua and Barbuda
7	June 11	Distrito Federal	Brasília	Mexico
8	June 12	Pernambuco	Recife	Venezuela
9	June 13	Alagoas	Maceió	Barbados
10	June 14	Paraíba	João Pessoa	Guatemala
11	June 15	Pernambuco	Fernando de Noronha	Cayman Islands
11	June 15	Rio Grande do Norte	Natal	Ecuador
12	June 16	Ceará	Fortaleza	Argentina
13	June 17	Piauí	Teresina	Netherlands Antilles
14	June 18	Tocantins	Palmas	Bermuda
15	June 19	Maranhão	São Luis	Jamaica
16	June 20	Pará	Belém	Colombia
17	June 21	Amapá	Macapá	Suriname
18	June 22	Roraima	Boa Vista	Guyana
19	June 23	Amazonas	Manaus	Aruba
20	June 24	Acre	Rio Branco	Bolivia
21	June 25	Rondônia	Porto Velho	Belize
22	June 26	Mato Grosso	Cuiabá	Nicaragua
23	June 27	Mato Grosso	Campo Novo do Parecis^{1}	-
24	June 28	Mato Grosso do Sul	Campo Grande	Dominica
25	June 29	Rio Grande do Sul	Porto Alegre	Uruguay
26	June 30	Paraná	Foz do Iguaçu	Paraguay
27	July 1	Santa Catarina	Florianópolis	Puerto Rico
28	July 2	Santa Catarina	Blumenau	Trinidad and Tobago
28	July 2	Santa Catarina	Balneário Camboriú	El Salvador
29	July 3	Paraná	Curitiba	Chile
30	July 4	No travelling		
31	July 5	São Paulo	Guarulhos	Grenada
32	July 6	São Paulo	Santos	Honduras
33	July 7	São Paulo	Americana^{1}	Haiti
33	July 7	São Paulo	Campinas	Haiti
34	July 8	São Paulo	São Paulo	United States of America
35	July 9	Rio de Janeiro	Quilombo Campinho da Independência^{1}	British Virgin Islands
35	July 9	Rio de Janeiro	Parati	British Virgin Islands
35	July 9	Rio de Janeiro	Angra dos Reis	Virgin Islands
36	July 10	Rio de Janeiro	Nova Iguaçu^{1}	Panama
36	July 10	Rio de Janeiro	Duque de Caxias	Panama
36	July 10	Rio de Janeiro	Petrópolis	Saint Kitts and Nevis
37	July 11	Rio de Janeiro	Macaé^{1}	Saint Lucia
37	July 11	Rio de Janeiro	Rio das Ostras^{1}	Saint Lucia
37	July 11	Rio de Janeiro	Búzios	Saint Lucia
38	July 12	Rio de Janeiro	Niterói	Peru
39	July 13	Rio de Janeiro	Rio de Janeiro	Brazil

^{1} denotes municipality
