= Bermuda at the 1995 Pan American Games =

Bermuda at the 2011 Pan American Games
- IOC code: BER
- NOC: Bermuda Olympic Association
- Website: www.olympics.bm

in Guadalajara 14–30 October 2011
- Competitors: 38 in 6 sports
- Medals Ranked 29th: Gold 0 Silver 0 Bronze 1 Total 1

Pan American Games appearances (overview)
- 1967; 1971; 1975; 1979; 1983; 1987; 1991; 1995; 1999; 2003; 2007; 2011; 2015; 2019; 2023; 2027

The 12th Pan American Games were held in Mar del Plata, Argentina from March 11 to March 26, 1995.

== Results by events ==
=== Athletics ===
- Brian Wellman
- Terrance Armstrong
- Troy Douglas
- Jennifer Fisher

=== Cycling ===
- Elliot Hubbard

=== Football ===
- Timothy Figureido
- Shawn Smith
- Kimandi Binns
- Sean Simmons
- Andrew Rahman
- Dean Bailey
- Karl Roberts
- Dano Outerbridge
- Quincy Aberdeen
- Shawn Simons
- Janeiro Turcker
- Jermaine Belboda
- Jahmah Samuels
- Nakia Smith
- Ottis Steede
- Steve Mendes
- Dwayne Adams

=== Karate ===
- Alton Wharton
- Dwayne Williams
- Eugene Ford
- Bobby Smith
- Roger Trimm
- Nigel Williams

=== Sailing ===
- Malcolm Smith
- Peter Bromby
- Lee White
- Stephen Dickinson
- Heath Foggo
- Elizabeth Walker
- Paula Lewin
- Blythe Walker

=== Water Ski ===
- Kent Richardson

== See also ==
- Bermuda at the 1996 Summer Olympics
