= Bermuda at the 1999 Pan American Games =

- IOC code: BER
- NOC: Bermuda Olympic Association
- Website: www.olympics.bm

in Winnipeg 23 July – 8 August 1999
- Competitors: 30 in 7 sports
- Medals Ranked 16th: Gold 1 Silver 2 Bronze 0 Total 3

Pan American Games appearances (overview)
- 1967; 1971; 1975; 1979; 1983; 1987; 1991; 1995; 1999; 2003; 2007; 2011; 2015; 2019; 2023; 2027

The 13th Pan American Games were held in Winnipeg, Manitoba, Canada from July 23 to August 8, 1999.

== Medals ==
=== Gold ===
===== Equestrian =====
- Three-day Event: Mary Jane Tumbridge

== Results by events ==
=== Athletics ===
- Brian Wellman
- Terrance Armstrong
- DeVon Bean

=== Bowling ===
- Antoine Jones
- Steven Riley
- June Dill
- Dianne Ingham
- Patricia Price
- Darnell Raynor
- Dean Lightbourn
- Conrad Lister

=== Cycling ===
- Elliot Hubbard

=== Gymnastics ===
- Walid Mustafa
- Josee Roy
- Laura Murphy
- Sasha Christensen
- Christina White
- Alexandra Froncioni
- Leila Wadson

=== Equestrian ===
- Mary Jane Tumbridge
- Kevin Edwards
- Catherine Fox
- Christopher Taylor

=== Sailing ===
- Malcolm Smith
- Sara Wright
- Brett Wright
- Christian Luthi

=== Swimming ===
- Stephen Troake
- Ronald Cowen
- Matthew Hammond

== See also ==
- Bermuda at the 2000 Summer Olympics
