= Bermuda at the 2023 Pan American Games =

- Flag of Bermuda
- IOC code: BER
- NOC: Bermuda Olympic Association

in Santiago, Chile 20 October 2023 – 5 November 2023
- Competitors: 11 in 5 sports
- Flag bearers (opening): Conor White & Emma Harvey
- Flag bearers (closing): Tyler Smith & Erica Hawley
- Medals Ranked =31st: Gold 0 Silver 0 Bronze 1 Total 1

Pan American Games appearances (overview)
- 1967; 1971; 1975; 1979; 1983; 1987; 1991; 1995; 1999; 2003; 2007; 2011; 2015; 2019; 2023; 2027

Bermuda competed at the 2023 Pan American Games in Santiago, Chile from 20 October to 5 November 2023. This was Bermuda's 15th appearance at the Pan American Games, having competed at every Games since making its debut in 1967.

On 2 October 2023, the Bermuda Olympic Association officially named the team of 11 athletes competing in five sports.

Cyclist Conor White and swimmer Emma Harvey were the country's flagbearers during the opening ceremony. Meanwhile, triathletes Tyler Smith and Erica Hawley were the country's flagbearers during the closing ceremony.

== Medalists ==
The following Bermudian competitors won medals at the games. In the by discipline sections below, medalists' names are bolded.

Medal	Name	Sport	Event	Date
Bronze	Conor White	Cycling	Men's road time trial	October 22

== Competitors ==
The following is the list of number of competitors (per gender) who participated at the games per sport/discipline.

Sport	Men	Women	Total
Athletics	1	—N/a	1
Cycling	2	—N/a	2
Sailing	1	1	2
Swimming	2	2	4
Triathlon	1	1	2
Total	7	4	11

== Athletics ==
Bermuda qualified one male athlete.

Key

- Note–Ranks given for track events are within the athlete's heat only
- **Q** = Qualified for the next round
- **q** = Qualified for the next round as a fastest loser
- Bye = Athlete not required to compete in round

Men

Track & road events

Athlete	Event	Semifinal		Final	
Athlete	Event	Time	Rank	Time	Rank
Dage Minors	1500 m	—N/a		3:57.76	12

== Cycling ==
Bermuda qualified a total of 2 cyclists (2 men).

=== Road ===
Bermuda qualified two male road cyclists through the 2023 Pan American Championships in Panama City, Panama.

Men

Athlete	Event	Time	Rank
Conor White	Road race	3:46.16	14
Kaden Hopkins	Road race	3:48.29	24
**Conor White**	Time trial	48:13.96	3rd place, bronze medalist(s)
Kaden Hopkins	Time trial	48:45.41	5

== Sailing ==
Bermuda qualified two boats for a total of two sailors.

Athlete	Event	Opening series												Finals		
Athlete	Event	1	2	3	4	5	6	7	8	9	10	Points	Rank	M	Points	Rank
Campbell Patton	Laser	6	7	9	12	12	10	4	13	~~15~~	11	84	12	Did not advance		
Adriana Penruddocke	Laser radial	9	7	~~11~~	11	5	11	9	11	10	6	79	10	Did not advance		

== Swimming ==
Bermuda qualified four swimmers (two men and two women).

Key

- Note – Ranks given are for the entire round
- **NR** – National record
- **Q** – Qualified to the medal final
- **q** – Qualified to the non-medal final

Men

Athlete	Event	Heat		Final	
Athlete	Event	Time	Rank	Time	Rank
Jack Harvey	100 m backstroke	57.04	18	Did not advance	
Jack Harvey	200 m backstroke	2:05.13	11 **q**	2:04.57	12
Sam Williamson	200 m freestyle	1:57.37	21	Did not advance	
Sam Williamson	100 m breaststroke	1:08.13	25	Did not advance	
Sam Williamson	200 m breaststroke	2:28.54	23	Did not advance	
Sam Williamson	200 m individual medley	2:10.51	22	Did not advance	
Sam Williamson	400 m individual medley	4:43.76	17	Did not advance	

Women

Athlete	Event	Heat		Final	
Athlete	Event	Time	Rank	Time	Rank
Emma Harvey	50 m freestyle	25.96	12 **q**	25.81	11
Emma Harvey	100 m backstroke	1:02.42	8 **Q**	1:02.35	8
Emma Harvey	100 m butterfly	1:01.40	11 **q**	1:00.72	9
Madelyn Moore	50 m freestyle	26.26	17 **q**	26.28	15
Madelyn Moore	100 m freestyle	58.37	24	Did not advance	

== Triathlon ==
Bermuda qualified a team of two triathletes (one man and one woman).

Individual

Athlete	Event	Swim (1.5 km)	Trans 1	Bike (40 km)	Trans 2	Run (10 km)	Total	Rank
Tyler Smith	Men's	18:15	0:48	55:44	0:25	31:48	1:47:02	7
Erica Hawley	Women's	19:20	0:52	1:02:09	0:28	35:27	1:58:18	4

== See also ==
- Bermuda at the 2023 Parapan American Games
- Bermuda at the 2024 Summer Olympics
