= Swimming at the 2023 Pan American Games – Women's 50 metre freestyle =

Women's 50 metre freestyle at the 2023 Pan American Games
- Venue: Aquatic Centre
- Date: 24 October 2023
- Competitors: 36 from 28 nations

Medalists
Gold medal	Maggie MacNeil	Canada
Gold medal	Gabriela Albiero	United States
Bronze medal	Catie De Loof	United States

The women's 50 metre freestyle competition of the swimming events at the 2023 Pan American Games were held on 24 October 2023, at the Aquatic Center in Santiago, Chile.

== Records ==
Prior to this competition, the existing world and Pan American Games records were as follows:

World record	Haiyang Qin (CHN)	23.61	Fukuoka, Japan	29 July 2023
Pan American Games record	Arianna Vanderpoo-Wallace (BAH)	24.31	Toronto, Canada	17 July 2015

== Results ==
KEY:	QA	Qualified for A final	QB	Qualified for B final	GR	Games record	NR	National record	PB	Personal best	SB	Seasonal best

=== Heats ===
The first round was held on 24 October.

Rank	Heat	Lane	Name	Nationality	Time	Notes
1	5	4	Catie De Loof	United States	24.79	QA
2	4	4	Gabi Albiero	United States	25.03	QA
3	3	4	Maggie MacNeil	Canada	25.28	QA
4	5	5	Lorrane Ferreira	Brazil	25.30	QA
5	4	5	Stephanie Balduccini	Brazil	25.50	QA
6	5	3	Sofia Revilak	Mexico	25.57	QA
7	4	3	Sirena Rowe	Colombia	25.63	QA
8	3	3	Andrea Berrino	Argentina	25.64	QA
9	5	6	Anicka Delgado	Ecuador	25.65	QB
10	4	2	Lismar Lyon	Venezuela	25.91	QB
11	5	7	Isabella Arcila	Colombia	25.92	QB
12	3	7	Emma Harvey	Bermuda	25.96	QB
13	3	6	Marina Spadoni	El Salvador	26.10	QB
14	4	7	Andrea Sansores	Mexico	26.12	QB
15	3	1	Emily Macdonald	Jamaica	26.23	QB
16	3	2	Rafaela Fernandini	Peru	26.25	QB
17	5	2	Madelyn Moore	Bermuda	26.26	
18	3	5	Ashley Thompson	Trinidad and Tobago	26.32	
19	5	1	Elisabeth Timmer	Aruba	26.38	
20	2	7	Inés Marín	Chile	26.57	
21	4	1	Luna María Chabat	Uruguay	26.68	
22	1	5	Beatriz Padron	Costa Rica	26.73	
23	5	8	María José Ribera	Bolivia	26.89	
24	4	8	María Schutzmeier	Nicaragua	27.15	
25	2	8	Sarah Szklaruk	Chile	27.25	
26	2	2	Tilly Collymore	Grenada	27.43	
26	2	6	María Castillo	Panama	27.34	
28	2	5	Abril Aunchayna	Uruguay	27.37	
29	2	3	Victoria Russell	Bahamas	27.54	
30	3	8	María Santis	Independent Athletes Team	27.56	
31	1	3	Kennice Greene	Saint Vincent and the Grenadines	27.71	
32	2	4	María José Arrua	Paraguay	27.81	
32	2	1	Aleka Persaud	Guyana	27.81	
34	1	6	Kaeylin Djoparto	Suriname	30.21	
—N/a	1	4	Kyra Rabess	Cayman Islands	DNS	
—N/a	4	6	Katerine Savard	Canada	DNS	

=== Final B ===
The B final was held on 24 October.

Rank	Lane	Name	Nationality	Time	Notes
9	4	Anicka Delgado	Ecuador	25.45	
10	5	Lismar Lyon	Venezuela	25.55	
11	3	Emma Harvey	Bermuda	25.81	
12	2	Andrea Sansores	Mexico	25.92	
13	6	Marina Spadoni	El Salvador	26.00	
14	1	Rafaela Fernandini	Peru	26.12	
15	8	Madelyn Moore	Bermuda	26.28	
16	7	Emily Macdonald	Jamaica	26.37	

=== Final A ===
The B final was held on 24 October.

Rank	Lane	Name	Nationality	Time	Notes
1st place, gold medalist(s)	3	Maggie MacNeil	Canada	24.84	
1st place, gold medalist(s)	5	Gabi Albiero	United States	24.84	
3rd place, bronze medalist(s)	4	Catie De Loof	United States	24.88	
4	6	Lorrane Ferreira	Brazil	25.17	
5	2	Stephanie Balduccini	Brazil	25.25	
6	7	Sofia Revilak	Mexico	25.67	
7	1	Sirena Rowe	Colombia	25.84	
8	8	Andrea Berrino	Argentina	25.98	
