= Bermuda at the 2024 World Aquatics Championships =

- Flag of Bermuda
- FINA code: BER
- National federation: Bermuda Amateur Swimming Association
- Website: basa.bm

in Doha, Qatar
- Competitors: 1 in 1 sport
- Medals: Gold 0 Silver 0 Bronze 0 Total 0

World Aquatics Championships appearances
- 1973; 1975; 1978; 1982; 1986; 1991; 1994; 1998; 2001; 2003; 2005; 2007; 2009; 2011; 2013; 2015; 2017; 2019; 2022; 2023; 2024

Bermuda competed at the 2024 World Aquatics Championships in Doha, Qatar from 2 to 18 February.

== Competitors ==
The following is the list of competitors in the Championships.

Sport	Men	Women	Total
Swimming	0	1	1
Total	0	1	1

== Swimming ==
Bermuda entered 1 swimmers.

Women

Athlete	Event	Heat		Semifinal		Final	
Athlete	Event	Time	Rank	Time	Rank	Time	Rank
Emma Harvey	50 metre freestyle	25.93	36	Did not advance			
Emma Harvey	50 metre backstroke	28.34 NR	10 Q	28.47	14	Did not advance	
Emma Harvey	100 metre backstroke	1:01.88 NR	19	Did not advance			
Emma Harvey	50 metre butterfly	26.88 NR	25	Did not advance			
