= Saint Vincent and the Grenadines at the 2023 Pan American Games =

- IOC code: VIN
- NOC: Saint Vincent and the Grenadines Olympic Committee

in Santiago, Chile 20 October 2023 – 5 November 2023
- Competitors: 4 in 3 sports
- Flag bearers (opening): Nikolas Sylvester & Kennice Greene
- Flag bearers (closing): Darren Morgan & Scarlett Hadley
- Medals: Gold 0 Silver 0 Bronze 0 Total 0

Pan American Games appearances (overview)
- 1991; 1995; 1999; 2003; 2007; 2011; 2015; 2019; 2023

The Saint Vincent and the Grenadines competed at the 2023 Pan American Games in Santiago, Chile from October 20 to November 5, 2023. This was Saint Vincent and the Grenadines's 9th appearance at the Pan American Games, having competed at every edition of the Games since 1991.

The Saint Vincent and the Grenadines team consisted of four athletes (two men and two women) competing in three sports. Swimmers Nikolas Sylvester and Kennice Greene were the country's flagbearers during the opening ceremony. Meanwhile, sprinter Darren Morgan and sailor Scarlett Hadley were the country's flagbearers during the closing ceremony.

== Competitors ==
The following is the list of number of competitors (per gender) participating at the games per sport/discipline.

Sport	Men	Women	Total
Athletics (track and field)	1	0	1
Sailing	0	1	1
Swimming	1	1	2
Total	2	2	4

== Athletics (track and field) ==
The Saint Vincent and the Grenadines received a wildcard spot to enter one male athlete.

Key

- Note–Ranks given for track events are within the athlete's heat only
- Q = Qualified for the next round
- q = Qualified for the next round as a fastest loser
- Bye = Athlete not required to compete in round

Men

Track and road events

Athlete	Event	Semifinals		Final	
Athlete	Event	Result	Rank	Result	Rank
Darren Morgan	100 m	11.06	20	Did not advance	

== Sailing ==
Saint Vincent and the Grenadines received two universality spots, one each in the laser and laser radial events respectively. The country later declined the men's quota. This marked the country's Pan American Games debut in the sport.

Women

Athlete	Event	Opening series												Finals		
Athlete	Event	1	2	3	4	5	6	7	8	9	10	Points	Rank	M	Points	Rank
Scarlett Hadley	Laser radial	17	17	17	~~18~~; ~~DNC~~	~~18~~; ~~DNC~~	17	16	17	16	16	151	17	Did not advance		

== Swimming ==
Saint Vincent and the Grenadines received two wildcards (one man and one woman).

Key

- Note – Ranks given are for the entire round
- PB – Personal best
- NR – National record
- Q – Qualified to the medal final
- q – Qualified to the non-medal final

Athlete	Event	Heat		Final	
Athlete	Event	Time	Rank	Time	Rank
Nikolas Sylvester	50 m freestyle	26.03	33	Did not advance	
Nikolas Sylvester	100 m breaststroke	1:13.11	27	Did not advance	
Kennice Greene	50 m freestyle	27.71 PB	31	Did not advance	
Kennice Greene	100 m freestyle	1:02.41	38	Did not advance	
Kennice Greene	100 m butterfly	1:09.03	27	Did not advance	

== See also ==
- Saint Vincent and the Grenadines at the 2023 Parapan American Games
- Saint Vincent and the Grenadines at the 2024 Summer Olympics
