= Swimming at the 2023 Pan American Games – Women's 100 metre butterfly =

Women's 100 metre butterfly at the 2023 Pan American Games
- Venue: Aquatic Centre
- Date: October 22
- Competitors: 28 from 21 nations

Medalists
Gold medal	Maggie MacNeil	Canada
Silver medal	Kelly Pash	United States
Bronze medal	Olivia Bray	United States

The women's 100 metre butterfly competition of the swimming events at the 2023 Pan American Games were held on October 22, 2023, at the Aquatic Center in Santiago, Chile.

== Records ==
Prior to this competition, the existing world and Pan American Games records were as follows:

World record	Haiyang Qin (CHN)	55.48	Rio de Janeiro, Brazil	August 7, 2016
Pan American Games record	Kelsi Worrell (USA)	57.24	Toronto, Canada	July 16, 2015

== Results ==
KEY:	QA	Qualified for A final	QB	Qualified for B final	GR	Games record	NR	National record	PB	Personal best	SB	Seasonal best

=== Heats ===
The highest eight scores advance to the final.

Rank	Heat	Lane	Name	Nationality	Time	Notes
1	3	4	Kelly Pash	United States	58.34	QA
2	2	4	Olivia Bray	United States	58.84	QA
3	3	6	Valentina Becerra	Colombia	59.70	QA
4	4	4	Maggie MacNeil	Canada	59.73	QA
5	2	6	Anicka Delgado	Ecuador	59.79	QA
6	4	5	Katerine Savard	Canada	59.87	QA
7	4	2	Clarissa Rodrigues	Brazil	1:00.02	QA
8	3	5	Giovanna Diamante	Brazil	1:00.47	QA
9	4	3	Celine Bispo	Brazil	1:00.47	QB
10	3	3	Miriam Guevara	Mexico	1:00.74	QB
11	2	2	Emma Harvey	Bermuda	1:01.40	QB
12	2	5	Athena Meneses	Mexico	1:01.81	QB
13	3	7	Lismar Lyon	Venezuela	1:01.88	QB
14	4	6	Karen Durango	Colombia	1:02.31	QB
15	3	2	Jade Foelske	Ecuador	1:02.35	QB
16	4	8	María Schutzmeier	Nicaragua	1:02.43	QB
17	2	7	Monstserrat Spielmann	Chile	1:02.53	
18	3	1	Lorena González	Cuba	1:03.08	
19	2	3	Luana Alonso	Paraguay	1:03.21	
20	3	8	María Fé Muñoz	Peru	1:03.35	
21	2	1	Julimar Ávila	Honduras	1:03.36	
22	4	7	Sabrina Lyn	Jamaica	1:04.09	
22	4	1	Isabella Alas	El Salvador	1:04.09	
24	2	8	Sierrah Broadbelt	Cayman Islands	1:04.48	
25	1	4	Aleka Persaud	Guyana	1:05.75	
26	1	3	María Morales	Independent Athletes Team	1:07.93	
27	1	5	Kennice Greene	Saint Vincent and the Grenadines	1:09.03	
28	1	6	Kaeylin Djoparto	Suriname	1:13.47	

=== Final B ===
The B final was held on October 21.

Rank	Lane	Name	Nationality	Time	Notes
9	3	Emma Harvey	Bermuda	1:00.72	
10	5	Miriam Guevara	Mexico	1:00.74	
11	6	Athena Meneses	Mexico	1:00.84	
12	4	Celine Bispo	Brazil	1:00.88	
13	7	Karen Durango	Colombia	1:00.98	
14	2	Lismar Lyon	Venezuela	1:01.86	
15	1	Jade Foelske	Ecuador	1:02.19	
16	8	María Schutzmeier	Nicaragua	1:02.33	

=== Final A ===
The A final was held on October 21.

Rank	Lane	Name	Nationality	Time	Notes
1st place, gold medalist(s)	6	Maggie MacNeil	Canada	56.94	
2nd place, silver medalist(s)	4	Kelly Pash	United States	57.85	
3rd place, bronze medalist(s)	5	Olivia Bray	United States	58.36	
4	3	Valentina Becerra	Colombia	59.21	NR
5	7	Katerine Savard	Canada	59.40	
6	8	Giovanna Diamante	Brazil	1:00.21	
7	1	Clarissa Rodrigues	Brazil	1:00.50	
8	2	Anicka Delgado	Ecuador	1:00.52	
