= Cycling at the 2003 Pan American Games – Road time trial =

The Road Individual Time Trial at the 2003 Pan American Games in Santo Domingo, Dominican Republic was held on the second day of the cycling competition, on 11 August 2003.

== Results ==
=== Men's Individual Time Trial (50 km) ===
Rank	Name	Time
1	José Serpa (COL)	1:04.45
2	Chris Baldwin (USA)	+ 0.39
3	Franklin Chacón (VEN)	+ 0.55
4	José Medina (CHI)	+ 1.25
5	Domingo González (MEX)	+ 1.45
6	Márcio May (BRA)	+ 2.14
7	Kris Hedges (BER)	+ 2.26
8	Hernán Bonilla (COL)	+ 2.39
9	Alexandre Cloutier (CAN)	+ 2.55
10	Murilo Fischer (BRA)	+ 3.17
11	Luis Romero (CUB)	+ 3.28
12	Wendy Palacios (DOM)	+ 5.23
13	Colby Pearce (USA)	+ 5.25
14	Juan Pablo Araya (CRC)	+ 5.33
15	Jean-François Laroche (CAN)	+ 6.17
16	Abel Jochola (GUA)	+ 7.47
17	Ignacio Sarabia (MEX)	+ 7.52
18	Geri Mewett (BER)	+ 8.49
19	Charles Fabian (ANT)	+ 12.00
–	Cid Michael Martínez (BOL)	DNS

=== Women's Individual Time Trial (30 km) ===
Rank	Name	Time
1	Kimberly Bruckner (USA)	41.11.00
2	Clara Hughes (CAN)	+ 0.38
3	Kristin Armstrong (USA)	+ 1.32
4	Paola Madriñan (COL)	+ 2.01
5	Yoanka González (CUB)	+ 2.30
6	Rosane Kirch (BRA)	+ 2.49
7	Yudemis Dominguez (CUB)	+ 3.05
8	Janildes Fernandes (BRA)	+ 3.08
9	Evelyn García (ESA)	+ 3.20
10	Sandra Gómez (COL)	+ 3.21
11	Marie Rosado (PUR)	+ 4.31
12	Ines Eppers (BOL)	+ 4.33
13	Anrossy Paruta (VEN)	+ 4.35
14	Amelia Blanco (DOM)	+ 4.42
15	Julia Hawley (BER)	+ 4.54
16	María Dolores Molina (GUA)	+ 5.05
17	Patricia Palencia (MEX)	+ 7.29
17	María Castañeda (GUA)	+ 7.29
–	Ana Padilla (ECU)	DNS

== See also ==
- Cycling at the 2004 Summer Olympics – Men's road time trial
- Cycling at the 2004 Summer Olympics – Women's road time trial
