= Equestrian at the 2011 Pan American Games – Qualification =

There will be a maximum of 130 competitors, and each NOC is allowed to enter a maximum of four athletes each in dressage and jumping and five athletes each in eventing. National federations are required to send to FEI a Certificate of Capability for the 2011 Pan American Games with a record of results for all riders and horses intending to compete no later than midnight (Switzerland time) on Monday, July 11, 2011.

== Qualification summary ==
Nation	Individual			Team			Total
Nation	Dressage	Eventing	Jumping	Dressage	Eventing	Jumping	Total
Argentina	1	5	4		X	X	10
Bermuda			2				2
Brazil	4	3	3	X	X	X	12
Canada	4	5	4	X	X	X	13
Cayman Islands	1						1
Chile	4	5	4	X	X	X	13
Colombia	4	5	4	X	X	X	13
Costa Rica	4			X			4
Dominican Republic	3			X			3
Ecuador	4	3	4	X	X	X	11
El Salvador		1	2				3
Guatemala	4	5	4	X	X	X	12
Honduras	1						1
Mexico	4	5	4	X	X	X	13
Panama			1				1
Peru			4			X	4
Puerto Rico	3	1	3	X		X	7
Uruguay		2	4			X	5
United States	4	5	4	X	X	X	13
Venezuela	4	4	4	X	X	X	12
Total: 20 NOCs	49	49	55	12	10	13	152

== Dressage ==
Riders and horses must obtain qualification for the 2011 Pan American Games at events that take place from January 1, 2010 until July 10, 2011. All rider and horse combinations must have achieved a minimum qualification criteria by the date mentioned above which is to have achieved 60% in an FEI Prix St Georges Test 2000 on two occasions, in a CDI or a National Dressage event.

The following countries have qualified:

Team

Event	Athletes per country	Qualified
Team event	5	Argentina; Brazil; Canada; Chile; Colombia; Guatemala; Mexico; United States
Team event	4	Venezuela
Team event	3	Ecuador
TOTAL TEAMS	12	

Individual

Event	Athletes per country	Qualified
Team event members	4	Brazil; Canada; Chile; Colombia; Costa Rica; Ecuador; Guatemala; Mexico; United States; Venezuela
Team event members	3	Dominican Republic; Puerto Rico
Individual athletes	1	Maria Manfredi (ARG); Jessica McTaggart (CAY); Karen Atala (HON)
TOTAL	49	

== Eventing ==
Riders and horses must obtain qualification for the 2011 Pan American Games at events that take place from January 1, 2010 until July 10, 2011. All rider and horse combinations must have achieved the 2 (two) minimum eligibility results as follows:

- 1 CCI2
- 1 CIC2

The following countries have qualified:

Team

Event	Athletes per country	Qualified
Team event	5	Argentina; Brazil; Canada; Chile; Colombia; Guatemala; Mexico; United States
Team event	4	Venezuela
Team event	3	Ecuador
TOTAL TEAMS	10	

Individual

Event	Athletes per country	Qualified
Team event members	5	Argentina; Canada; Chile; Colombia; Guatemala; Mexico; United States
Team event members	4	Venezuela
Team event members	3	Ecuador; Brazil
Individual athletes	1	Gamboa Gonzalo (ESA); Lauren Billys (PUR); Federico Bidegarin (URU); Gimena Arrigoni (URU)
TOTAL	51	

== Jumping ==
All riders must have competed in at least one CSI event of any category prior to or in the year of the Pan American Games until July 10, 2011.

The following countries have qualified:

Team

Event	Athletes per country	Qualified
Team event	4	Argentina; Canada; Chile; Colombia; Ecuador; Guatemala; Mexico; United States; Venezuela
Team event	3	Puerto Rico; Brazil
TOTAL TEAMS	13	

Individual

Event	Athletes per country	Qualified
Team event members	4	Argentina; Brazil; Canada; Chile; Colombia; Ecuador; Guatemala; Mexico; United States; Venezuela
Team event members	3	Puerto Rico
Individual athletes	1	Patrick Nisbett (BER); Jillian Terciera (BER); Jose Alfredo Hernandez (ESA); Herbert Tobar-Ulloa (ESA); Gabriela Misrachi (PAN)
TOTAL	55	
