= Bermuda at the 2019 Pan American Games =

- IOC code: BER
- NOC: Bermuda Olympic Association

in Lima, Peru 26 July–11 August 2019
- Competitors: 17 in 7 sports
- Flag bearer: Cecilia Wollmann (opening)
- Medals: Gold 0 Silver 0 Bronze 0 Total 0

Pan American Games appearances (overview)
- 1967; 1971; 1975; 1979; 1983; 1987; 1991; 1995; 1999; 2003; 2007; 2011; 2015; 2019; 2023

Bermuda competed at the 2019 Pan American Games in Lima, Peru from 26 July to 11 August 2019.

In March 2019, the Bermuda Olympic Association announced Branwen Smith-King as the team's chef de mission. In July 2019, the Bermuda Olympic Association named a team of 17 athletes (ten men and seven women) competing in seven sports.

During the opening ceremony of the games, sailor Cecilia Wollmann carried the flag of the country as part of the parade of nations.

== Competitors ==
The following is the list of number of competitors (per gender) participating at the games per sport/discipline.

Sport	Men	Women	Total
Athletics (track and field)	2	0	2
Bowling	2	2	4
Cycling	0	2	2
Sailing	2	1	3
Squash	3	0	3
Swimming	1	1	2
Triathlon	0	1	1
Total	10	7	17

== Athletics (track and field) ==
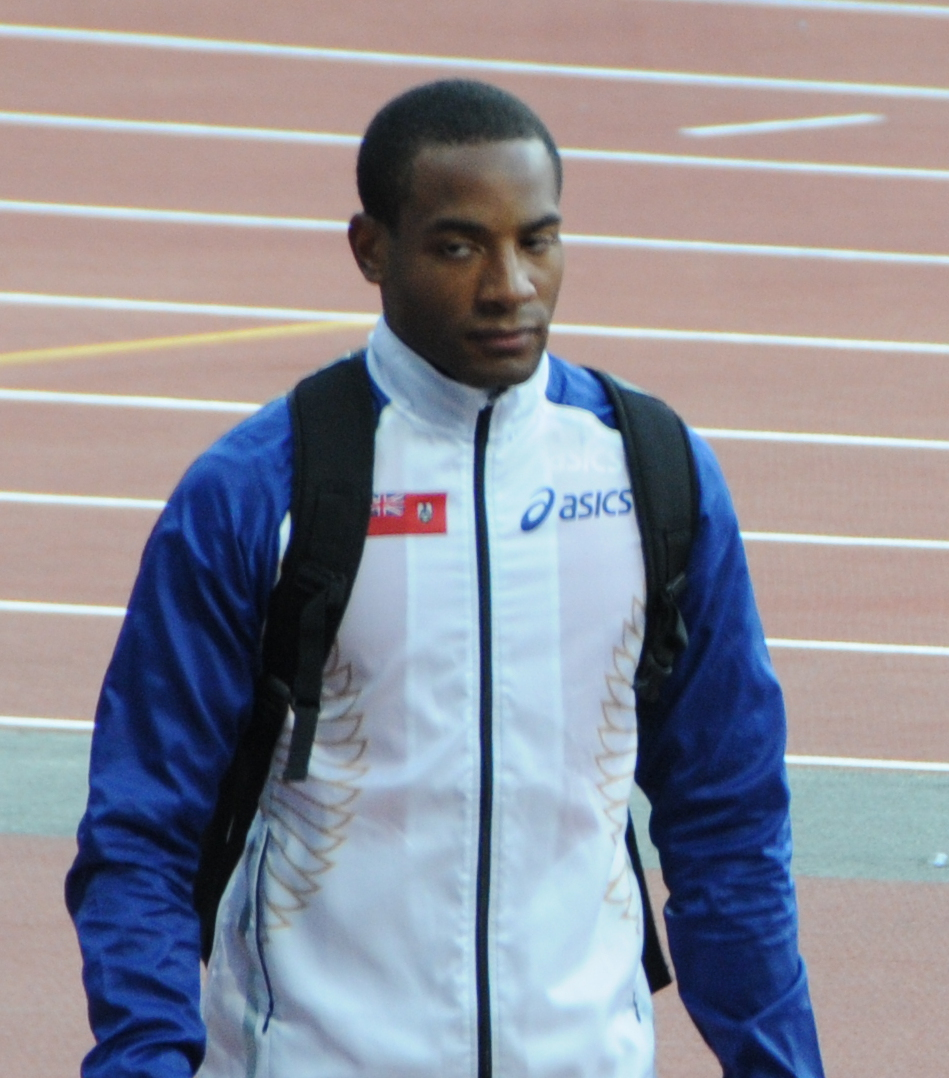
Tyrone Smith, finished in fifth in the men's long jump

Bermuda qualified two male athletes.

Key

- Note–Ranks given for track events are for the entire round

Men
Track events

Athlete	Event	Semifinals		Final	
Athlete	Event	Result	Rank	Result	Rank
Dage Minors	800 m	1:50.68	12	Did not advance	
Dage Minors	1500 m	—N/a		3:48.85	11

Field event

Athlete	Event	Final	
Athlete	Event	Distance	Position
Tyrone Smith	Long jump	7.74	5

== Bowling ==
Bermuda qualified two women by finishing among the top five at the PABCON Champion of Champions. Bermuda later qualified two men by finishing in the top qualification position at the 2019 PABCON Male Championships in Lima, Peru.

Athlete	Event	Qualification / Final														Round robin											Semifinal	Final	
Athlete	Event	Block 1						Block 2						Total	Rank	Round robin											Semifinal	Final	
Athlete	Event	1	2	3	4	5	6	7	8	9	10	11	12	Total	Rank	1	2	3	4	5	6	7	8	Total	Grand total	Rank	Opposition Result	Opposition Result	Rank
Damien Matthews	Men's singles	182	220	222	217	222	171	216	239	210	246	246	181	2572	17	Did not advance													
David Maycock	Men's singles	231	189	170	267	239	219	182	191	201	188	151	190	2418	27	Did not advance													
Damien Matthews; David Maycock	Men's doubles	390	421	372	448	418	369	484	480	469	470	397	482	5200	8	—N/a													
Patrice Tucker	Women's singles	142	195	227	174	188	156	174	176	216	188	175	178	2189	27	Did not advance													
June Dill	Women's singles	188	144	163	157	162	191	192	180	138	211	170	197	2093	32	Did not advance													
Patrice Tucker; June Dill	Women's doubles	290	325	315	385	336	301	335	262	363	331	342	356	3941	16	—N/a													

== Cycling ==
Bermuda qualified two female cyclists.

=== Road ===
Women

Athlete	Event	Final	
Athlete	Event	Time	Rank
Caitlin Conyers	Road race	2:19:52	10
Caitlin Conyers	Time trial	26:39.45	7
Nicole Mitchell	Road race	2:21:16	29
Nicole Mitchell	Time trial	29:43.02	19

== Sailing ==
Bermuda qualified a boat in the mixed Nacra 17 event and received a universality spot in the men's laser event.

Athlete	Event	Race													Net points	Final rank
Athlete	Event	1	2	3	4	5	6	7	8	9	10	11	12	M	Net points	Final rank
Malcolm Benn Smith	Men's laser	15	19	14	15	17	11	16	19	14	18	—N/a		Did not qualify	139	17
Michael Wollmann; Cecilia Wollmann	Mixed nacra 17	7	9	8	7	6	5	6	7	7	6	8	5	Did not qualify	72	8

== Squash ==
Bermuda qualified a men's team of three athletes. This will mark the sport debut at the Pan American Games for Bermuda.

Men
Singles and Doubles

Athlete	Event	Round of 32	Round of 16	Quarterfinals	Semifinals	Final	
Athlete	Event	Opposition Result	Opposition Result	Opposition Result	Opposition Result	Opposition Result	Rank
Noah Browne	Singles	Camiruaga (CHI); L 1–3 (11–8, 10–12, 3–11, 5–11)	Did not advance				
Micah Franklin	Singles	Aguilar (ESA); W 3–1 (6–11, 11–8, 11–8, 11–4)	Salazar (MEX); L 0–3 (7–11, 7–11, 5–11)	Did not advance			
Noah Browne; Micah Franklin	Doubles	—N/a	Camiruaga (CHI); Pinto (CHI); W 2–1 (9–11, 11–7, 11–2)	Hanson (USA); Harrity (USA); L 0–2 (6–11, 7–11)	Did not advance		

Team

Athlete	Event	Group stage			Round of 16	9 to 12 round	11th place match	
Athlete	Event	Opposition Result	Opposition Result	Rank	Opposition Result	Opposition Result	Opposition Result	Rank
Noah Browne; Micah Franklin; Nicholas Kyme	Team	Brazil; L 0–3	Colombia; L 0–3	3 Q	Argentina; L 0–2	Chile; L 1–2	El Salvador; L 1–2	12

== Swimming ==
Bermuda qualified two swimmers (one man and one woman).

Key

- Note – Ranks given are for the entire round
- QB – Qualified for the B final

Athlete	Event	Heat		Final	
Athlete	Event	Time	Rank	Time	Rank
Jesse Washington	Men's 50 m freestyle	23.92	25	Did not advance	
Jesse Washington	Men's 100 m freestyle	52.22	23	Did not advance	
Jesse Washington	Men's 200 m freestyle	1:56.52	19	Did not advance	
Jesse Washington	Men's 100 m butterfly	58.54	23	Did not advance	
Madelyn Moore	Women's 50 m freestyle	26.79	15 QB	26.52	14
Madelyn Moore	Women's 100 m freestyle	59.02	17 QB	58.68	16
Madelyn Moore	Women's 100 m butterfly	1:06.15	21	Did not advance	

== Triathlon ==
Bermuda qualified one female triathlete. Originally Flora Duffy and Tyler Smith qualified, but both withdrew from the team.

Women

Athlete	Event	Swim (1.5 km)	Trans 1	Bike (40 km)	Trans 2	Run (8.88 km)	Total	Rank
Erica Hawley	Individual	21:37	1:03	1:21:30	:28	40:38	2:15:44	21

== Non-competing sports ==
=== Rowing ===
Bermuda qualified one woman at the qualification tournament held in December 2018 in Rio de Janeiro, Brazil. Shelly Pearson finished fourth at the qualification tournament to qualify. Pearson later withdrew due to losing the passion she had for the sport and work commitments.

== See also ==
- Bermuda at the 2020 Summer Olympics
