= Bermuda at the 2007 Pan American Games =

- IOC code: BER
- NOC: Bermuda Olympic Association
- Website: www.olympics.bm

in Rio de Janeiro 13–29 July 2007
- Competitors: 19 in 7 sports
- Flag bearer: Kiera Aitken
- Medals Ranked 33rd: Gold 0 Silver 0 Bronze 0 Total 0

Pan American Games appearances (overview)
- 1967; 1971; 1975; 1979; 1983; 1987; 1991; 1995; 1999; 2003; 2007; 2011; 2015; 2019; 2023; 2027

The 15th Pan American Games were held in Rio de Janeiro, Brazil from 13 July to 29 July 2007.

== Results by events ==
=== Athletics ===
- Arantxa King
- Tyrone Smith
- Deon Brangman

=== Bowling ===
- Bobbie Ingham
- Patrice Tucker
- David Maycock
- Kevin Swan

=== Diving ===
- Katura Horton-Perinchief

=== Equestrian ===
- Annabelle Collins on Medici (Dressage)
- Jill Terceira on Navantus (Showjumping)
- Patrick Nisbett on Antille 8 (Showjumping)

=== Swimming ===
- Kiera Aitken
- Roy-Allan Burch

=== Sailing ===
- Malcolm Smith
- Brett Wright
- Katrina Williams
- Stephen Dickinson
- Leatrice Roman

=== Triathlon ===
==== Women's Competition ====
- Flora Duffy
  - 2:03:13.92 — 12th place

== See also ==
- Bermuda at the 2008 Summer Olympics
