= Cycling at the 2023 Pan American Games – Men's road time trial =

Men's road time trial at the 2023 Pan American Games
- Venue: Streets of Isla de Maipo
- Date: 22 October 2023
- Competitors: 15 from 10 nations
- Winning time: 47:02.72

Medalists
Gold medal	Walter Vargas	Colombia
Silver medal	Richard Carapaz	Ecuador
Bronze medal	Conor White	Bermuda

The men's road time trial competition of the cycling events at the 2023 Pan American Games was held on 22 October 2023 on the streets of Isla de Maipo, Chile.

== Schedule ==
Date	Time	Round
22 October 2023	13:00	Final

== Results ==
Rank	Rider	Nation	Time
1st place, gold medalist(s)	Walter Vargas	Colombia	47:02.72
2nd place, silver medalist(s)	Richard Carapaz	Ecuador	47:36.02
3rd place, bronze medalist(s)	Conor White	Bermuda	48:13.96
4	Eric Fagúndez	Uruguay	48:39.05
5	Kaden Hopkins	Bermuda	48:45.41
6	José Luis Rodríguez	Chile	49:10.18
7	Orluis Aular	Venezuela	49:12.63
8	Laureano Rosas	Argentina	49:23.94
9	Héctor Quintana	Chile	49:30.27
10	Chris Ernst	Canada	49:47.37
11	Clever Martínez	Venezuela	49:59.56
12	Victor Ocampo	Colombia	50:01.23
13	Campbell Parrish	Canada	50:08.45
14	Brayan Sánchez	Colombia	50:30.02
15	Bolivar Espinosa	Panama	50:44.68
