= Graham Smith (Bermudian swimmer) =

Bermudian swimmer (born 1982)

Personal information
- Full name: Graham Alexander Campbell Smith
- Nationality: Bermuda
- Born: 31 December 1982 (age 43) Bermuda
- Height: 6 ft 0 in (1.83 m)

Sport
- Sport: Swimming

Graham Smith (born 31 December 1982 in Bermuda) is an international-level swimmer from Bermuda. As of June 2009, he holds the Bermuda Record in the long-course 400 IM.

He swam at the:

- 2002 Commonwealth Games (50 free; 50, 100 & 200 breaststrokes)
- 2003 Island Games
- 2005 World Championships (50 free; 50, 100 & 200 breaststroke; 100 fly; 200 IM)
- 2006 Commonwealth Games (100 free; 100 & 200 breaststroke; 200 IM)
