= Saint Vincent and the Grenadines at the 1991 Pan American Games =

- IOC code: VIN
- NOC: The St. Vincent and the Grenadines National Olympic Committee
- Website: www.svgnoc.org

in Havana 8–18 August 1991
- Competitors: 10 in 2 sports
- Officials: 2
- Medals: Gold 0 Silver 0 Bronze 0 Total 0

Pan American Games appearances (overview)
- 1991; 1995; 1999; 2003; 2007; 2011; 2015; 2019; 2023

Saint Vincent and the Grenadines made its debut at the 11th Pan American Games in Havana, Cuba from August 2 to August 18, 1991.

== Athletics ==
Saint Vincent and the Grenadines sent six track and field athletes.

- Eswort Coombs
- Dexter Browne
- Eversley Linley
- Kent Dennie
- Bigna Samuel
- Yvette Haynes

== Table tennis ==
Saint Vincent and the Grenadines sent four table tennis athletes.

- Sharon Bailey
- Sean Stanley
- Joseph Carrington
- Truman Quashie

== See also ==
- Saint Vincent and the Grenadines at the 1992 Summer Olympics
