= Coat of arms of Bermuda =

Coat of arms

- Armiger: Bermuda
- Adopted: 1910; 116 years ago
- Shield: An antique shield azure thereon a representation of the wreck of the ship Sea Venture proper.
- Supporters: Argent, a lion sejant affronté Gules.
- Compartment: A mount vert
- Motto: Quo Fata Ferunt "Whither the Fates carry (us)"
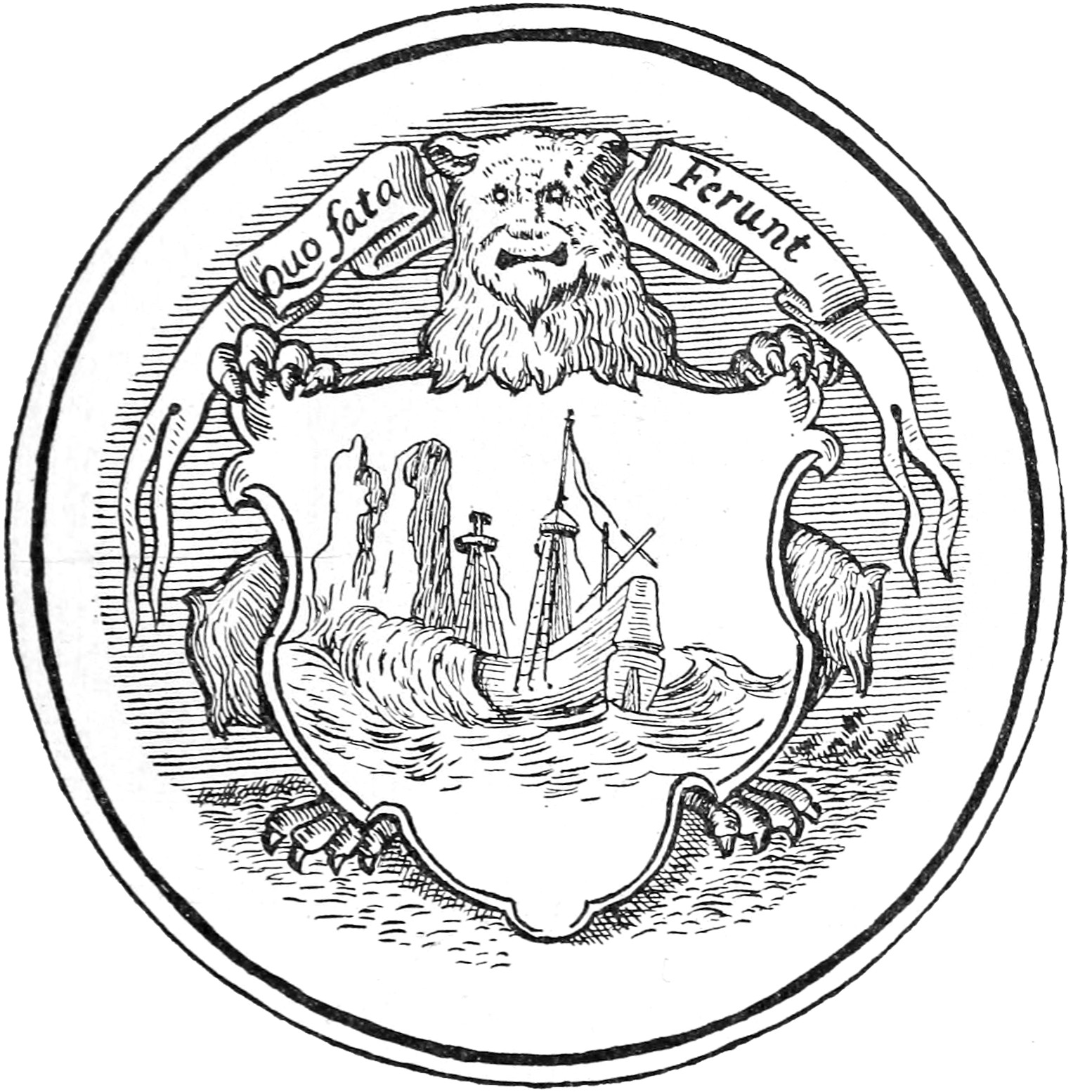
- Earlier version(s): (c. 1622) (1817 seal)

The coat of arms of Bermuda depicts a red lion with a shield that has a depiction of a wrecked ship upon it. The red lion is a symbol of Great Britain and alludes to Bermuda's relationship with that country. The Latin motto under the coat of arms, Quo Fata Ferunt, means "Whither the Fates Carry [Us]". The modern design of the wrecked ship is known to be the Sea Venture. The arms were formally granted by Royal Warrant on 4 October 1910, but had been in use since at least 1624. The coat of arms first appears on the cover of the 1624 edition of The Generall Historie of Virginia, New-England, and the Summer Isles. The "Somers Isles" is another name for Bermuda, named after Sir George Somers, the colony's founder.

== Blazon ==
The heraldic blazon is: Argent, on a mount vert a lion sejant affronté gules supporting between the fore-paws an antique shield azure thereon a representation of the wreck of the ship Sea Venture proper.

== Sea Venture shipwreck ==
On 2 June 1609, Sea Venture set sail from Plymouth, England as the flagship of a seven-ship fleet (towing two additional pinnaces) destined for Jamestown, Virginia. On 24 July, the fleet ran into a tropical storm, likely a hurricane, and the ships were separated. Sea Venture fought the storm for three days. Admiral Sir George Somers, piloting the leaking ship, wedged the Sea Venture onto the reefs of eastern Bermuda. This allowed 150 people, and one dog, to be landed safely ashore.

The survivors, including several company officials (Lieutenant-General Sir Thomas Gates, Captain Christopher Newport, George Yeardley, Silvester Jourdain, Stephen Hopkins, and William Strachey, among others), were stranded on Bermuda for approximately nine months. The castaways would build two ships and arrive in Jamestown, Virginia, in May, 1610. Newport and Gates sailed back to England, and arrived in September to report the events to the Virginia Company of London and the public.

Previous shipwreck design

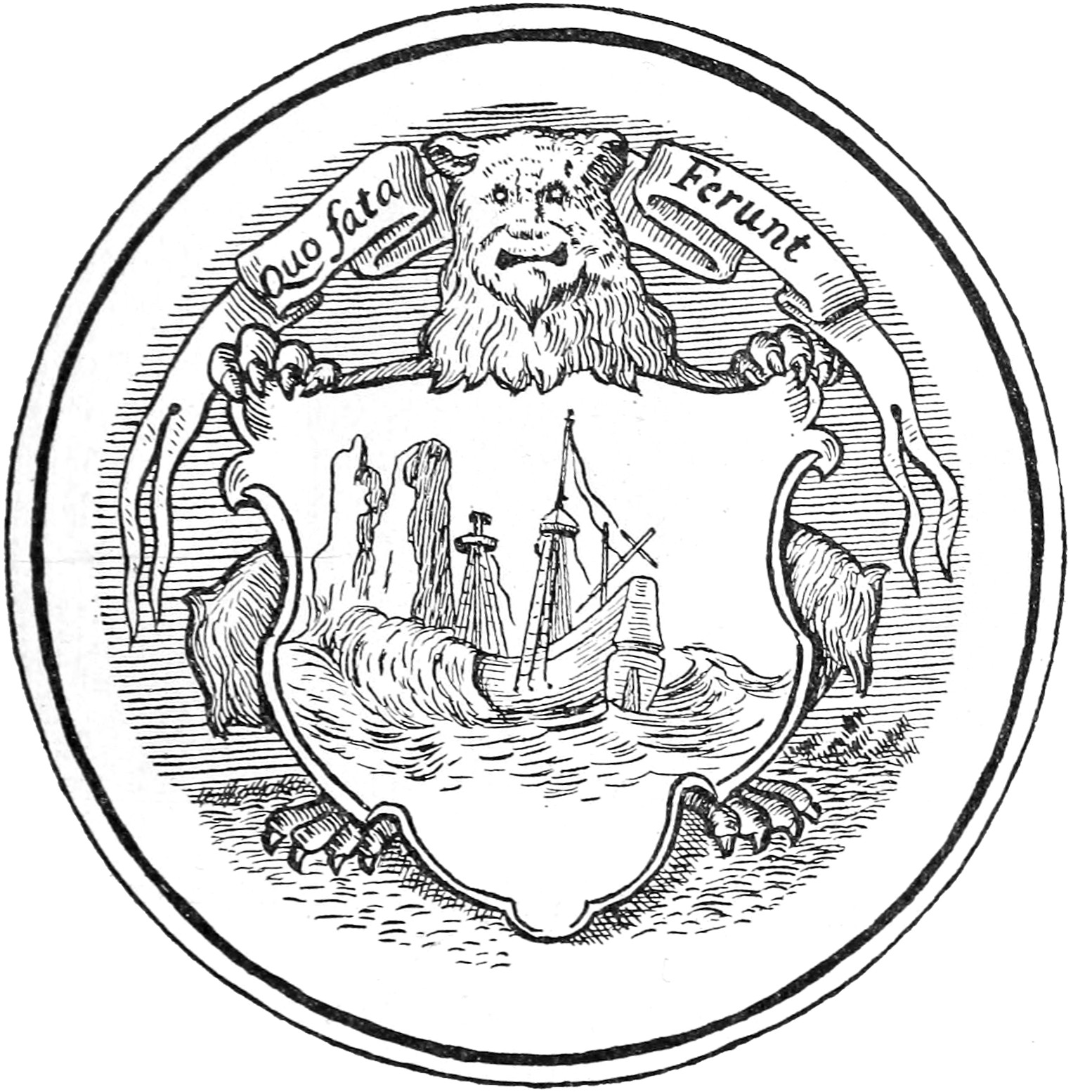
Facsimile of an engraving from Richard Norwood's 1622 map. Notice the tall rocks and broken ship masts.

In 2009, a paper and documentary were published with evidence that the shipwreck on the original crest (as seen on the 1622 Richard Norwood map) was actually a Dutch vessel. In 1593, an unnamed Dutch ship, with a French crew, wrecked on North Rock, some distance north of the main archipelago. That shipwreck marooned the first Englishman on Bermuda: Henry May. The obvious image of North Rock as it was in the 1600s has been erroneously modified to look like the high "cliffs" visible on the crest today. Henry May and the survivors would leave Bermuda in May, 1594, making the archipelago infamous to English culture, more than 15 years before the tale of the Sea Venture was known in Europe.

== Flag of Bermuda ==
On 4 October 1910, the coat of arms (without the banner holding the motto) was added to the Red Ensign to create the current flag of Bermuda. The coat of arms replaced a badge which had been in use on the Bermuda red ensign before October 1910. The badge was based on a sketch, made in 1869, of the 1817 seal, which depicted a wet dock of the time showing with some boats in the background. It is assumed that the scene alludes to the fact that the islands were a stopover base for the sailing ships when the badge was approved by the Admiralty.

== See also ==
- Flag of Bermuda
- List of coats of arms of the United Kingdom and dependencies
