= Sailing at the 2023 Pan American Games – ILCA 6 =

ILCA 6 at the 2023 Pan American Games
- Venue: Cofradia Nautica del Pacifico
- Dates: October 28 - November 4
- Competitors: 17 from 16 nations

Medalists
Gold medal	Erika Reineke	United States
Silver medal	Sarah Douglas	Canada
Bronze medal	Luciana Cardozo	Argentina

The ILCA 6 competition of the sailing events at the 2023 Pan American Games in Santiago was held from October 28 to November 4 at the Cofradia Nautica del Pacifico.

Points were assigned based on the finishing position in each race (1 for first, 2 for second, etc.). The points were totaled from the top 9 results of the first 10 races, with lower totals being better. If a sailor was disqualified or did not complete the race, 18 points were assigned for that race (as there were 17 sailors in this competition). The top 5 sailors at that point competed in the final race, with placings counting double for final score. The sailor with the lowest total score won.

Erika Reineke from the United States dominated the regatta to finish ahead of his opponents for the title. Sarah Douglas from Canada was the runner-up and Luciana Cardozo from Argentina received the bronze medal.

== Schedule ==
All times are (UTC-3).

Date	Time	Round
October 28, 2023	14:13	Races 1 and 2
October 30, 2023	13:11	Races 3, 4 and 5
October 31, 2023	15:01	Race 6
November 1, 2023	14:13	Races 7 and 8
November 2, 2023	16:07	Races 9 and 10
November 4, 2023	12:43	Medal race

== Results ==
The results were as below.
Race M is the medal race.

Rank	Athlete	Nation	Race											Total Points	Net Points
Rank	Athlete	Nation	1	2	3	4	5	6	7	8	9	10	M	Total Points	Net Points
1st place, gold medalist(s)	Erika Reineke	United States	2	1	1	1	1	2	1	1	1	4	2	17	13
2nd place, silver medalist(s)	Sarah Douglas	Canada	1	2	4	2	2	1	4	4	2	3	4	29	25
3rd place, bronze medalist(s)	Luciana Cardozo	Argentina	3	3	3	4	3	5	5	2	(6)	1	6	41	35
4	Dolores Fraschini	Uruguay	4	4	2	5	4	(8)	6	5	4	2	10	54	46
5	Florencia Chiarella	Peru	5	5	6	3	(18); OCS	3	2	8	5	7	8	70	52
6	Elena Oetling	Mexico	(11)	8	5	6	6	7	3	9	3	8	—N/a	66	55
7	Gabriella Kidd	Brazil	6	6	7	7	7	4	8	3	7	(10)	—N/a	65	55
8	Agustina von Appen	Chile	7	(10)	10	8	8	10	7	7	8	5	—N/a	80	70
9	Cristina Estrada	Independent Athletes Team	10	9	9	9	9	6	(11)	6	11	9	—N/a	89	78
10	Adriana Penrudocke	Bermuda	9	7	(11)	11	5	11	9	11	10	6	—N/a	90	79
11	Daniela Hernández	Venezuela	8	(11)	8	10	10	9	10	10	9	11	—N/a	96	85
12	Charlotte Webster	Cayman Islands	12	12	(13)	12	11	12	13	12	12	12	—N/a	121	108
13	Marina Negrón	Puerto Rico	(14)	13	12	13	12	13	14	13	13	14	—N/a	131	117
14	Agnese Morel	Uruguay	13	14	14	14	13	14	12	14	(15)	13	—N/a	136	121
15	Darling Flores	El Salvador	16	15	16	16	15; STP	15	(17)	15	14	15	—N/a	154	137
16	Lisbetzy Salazar	Cuba	16; STP	16	15	15	(18); DNC	16	15	16	17	18; DNS	—N/a	162	144
17	Scarlett Hadley	Saint Vincent and the Grenadines	17	17	17	(18); DNC	18; DNC	17	16	17	16	16	—N/a	169	151
