= Saint Vincent and the Grenadines at the 2011 Pan American Games =

- IOC code: VIN
- NOC: The St. Vincent and the Grenadines National Olympic Committee
- Website: www.svgnoc.org

in Guadalajara 14–30 October 2011
- Competitors: 4 in 3 sports
- Flag bearer: Kineke Alexander
- Medals: Gold 0 Silver 0 Bronze 0 Total 0

Pan American Games appearances (overview)
- 1991; 1995; 1999; 2003; 2007; 2011; 2015; 2019; 2023

The Saint Vincent and the Grenadines competed at the 2011 Pan American Games in Guadalajara, Mexico from October 14 to 30, 2011. The Saint Vincent and the Grenadines team consisted of four athletes in three sports.

== Athletics ==
The Saint Vincent and the Grenadines sent two athletes.

=== Men ===
Track and road events

| Event | Athletes | Heats | | Semifinal | | Final | |
| Event | Athletes | Result | Rank | Result | Rank | Result | Rank |
|---|---|---|---|---|---|---|---|
| 100 m | Courtney Williams | 11.15 | 30th | Did not advance | | | |
| 200 m | Courtney Williams | 22.42 | 29th | did not advance | | | |

=== Women ===
Track and road events

| Event | Athlete | Semifinals | | Final | |
| Event | Athlete | Result | Rank | Result | Rank |
|---|---|---|---|---|---|
| 400 m | Kineke Alexander | 53.42 SB | 12th | did not advance | |

== Cycling ==
The Saint Vincent and the Grenadines sent one cyclist who competed in road cycling.

=== Road ===
Men

| Athlete | Event | Time | Rank |
|---|---|---|---|
| Dominic Ollivierre | Men's road race | DNF | |

== Swimming ==
The Saint Vincent and the Grenadines sent one swimmer.

Men

| Athlete | Event | Heats | | Final | |
| Athlete | Event | Time | Rank | Time | Rank |
|---|---|---|---|---|---|
| Tolga Akcayli | 50 m freestyle | 25.65 | 19th | did not advance | |
