= Ronald Cowen =

Bermudian swimmer (born 1980)

Ronald Cowen.
Personal information
- Full name: Ronald Cowen
- Nickname: Ronny
- Nationality: Bermuda
- Born: 13 December 1980 (age 45) USA
- Height: 6 ft 3 in (1.91 m)

Sport
- Sport: Swimming
- Strokes: Freestyling

Ronald Cowen (born 13 December 1980 in the USA) is an international-level backstroke swimmer from Bermuda.

At the 2003 Pan American Games, he swam to a Bermuda Record in the 200 free (1:55.48).

== International tournaments ==
- 1999 Pan Am Games
- 2001 World Aquatics Championships
- 2002 Commonwealth Games (50, 100 & 200 freestyles; 100 backstroke)
- 2003 Island Games
- 2003 World Aquatics Championships
- 2003 Pan Am Games
- 2005 World Aquatics Championships (50, 100 & 200 frees)
- 2006 Commonwealth Games (50, 100, 200 & 400 frees, 50 fly)
