= Saint Vincent and the Grenadines at the 2019 Pan American Games =

- IOC code: VIN
- NOC: Saint Vincent and the Grenadines Olympic Committee

in Lima, Peru 26 July – 11 August 2019
- Competitors: 4 in 3 sports
- Flag bearer: Zefal Bailey (Opening)
- Medals: Gold 0 Silver 0 Bronze 0 Total 0

Pan American Games appearances (overview)
- 1991; 1995; 1999; 2003; 2007; 2011; 2015; 2019; 2023

The Saint Vincent and the Grenadines competed at the 2019 Pan American Games in Lima, Peru, from July 26 to August 11, 2019.

The full team of four athletes (three men and one woman) competing in three sports (athletics, cycling and swimming) was named on July 2, 2019. During the opening ceremony of the games, cyclist Zefal Bailey carried the flag of the country as part of the parade of nations.

== Competitors ==
The following is the list of number of competitors (per gender) participating at the games per sport/discipline.

Sport	Men	Women	Total
Athletics (track and field)	1	0	1
Cycling	1	0	1
Swimming	1	1	2
Total	3	1	4

== Athletics (track and field) ==
The Saint Vincent and the Grenadines qualified one male athlete.

Key

- Note–Ranks given for track events are for the entire round

Men
Track events

Athlete	Event	Semifinals		Final	
Athlete	Event	Result	Rank	Result	Rank
Brandon Valentine-Parris	200 m	21.47	13	did not advance	
Brandon Valentine-Parris	400 m	48.14	16	did not advance	

== Cycling ==
The Saint Vincent and the Grenadines received a reallocated quota for a male road cyclist.

=== Road ===
Men

Athlete	Event	Final	
Athlete	Event	Time	Rank
Zefal Bailey	Road race	did not finish	

== Swimming ==
The Saint Vincent and the Grenadines received two universality spots in swimming to enter one man and one woman.

Key

- Note – Ranks given are for the entire round

Athlete	Event	Heat		Final	
Athlete	Event	Time	Rank	Time	Rank
Cruz Halbich	Men's 50 m freestyle	25.72	32	did not advance	
Cruz Halbich	Men's 100 m freestyle	57.61	29	did not advance	
Cruz Halbich	Men's 200 m freestyle	2:10.04	22	did not advance	
Mya De Freitas	Women's 50 m freestyle	29.57	29	did not advance	
Mya De Freitas	Women's 100 m freestyle	1:03.49	26	did not advance	
Mya De Freitas	Women's 200 m freestyle	2:19.99	25	did not advance	
