= Swimming at the 2011 Pan American Games – Women's 100 metre backstroke =

Women's 100 metre backstroke at the 2011 Pan American Games
- Venue: Scotiabank Aquatics Center
- Dates: October 16 (preliminaries and finals)

Medalists
Gold medal	Rachel Bootsma	United States
Silver medal	Elizabeth Pelton	United States
Bronze medal	Maria Fernanda Gonzalez	Mexico

The women's 100 metre backstroke competition of the swimming events at the 2011 Pan American Games took place on October 16 at the Scotiabank Aquatics Center in the municipality of Zapopan, near Guadalajara, Mexico. The defending Pan American Games champion is Julia Smit of the United States.

This race consisted of two lengths of the pool, both lengths being in the backstroke.

== Records ==
Prior to this competition, the existing world and Pan American Games records were as follows:

World record	Gemma Spofforth (GBR)	58.12	Rome, Italy	July 28, 2009
Pan American Games record	Barbara Bedford (USA)	1:01.71	Mar del Plata, Argentina	March 14, 1995

== Qualification ==
Each National Olympic Committee (NOC) was able to enter up to two entrants providing they had met the A standard (1:03.7) in the qualifying period (January 1, 2010 to September 4, 2011). NOCs were also permitted to enter one athlete providing they had met the B standard (1:05.6) in the same qualifying period.

== Results ==
All times are in minutes and seconds.

KEY:	q	Fastest non-qualifiers	Q	Qualified	GR	Games record	NR	National record	PB	Personal best	SB	Seasonal best

=== Heats ===
The first round was held on October 16.

Rank	Heat	Lane	Name	Nationality	Time	Notes
1	2	4	Elizabeth Pelton	United States	1:01.57	GR, QA
2	3	4	Rachel Bootsma	United States	1:01.75	QA
3	3	5	Maria Fernanda Gonzalez	Mexico	1:01.84	QA
4	1	4	Fabiola Molina	Brazil	1:02.81	QA
5	3	3	Gisela Maria Morales	Guatemala	1:02.95	QA
6	2	5	Gabrielle Soucisse	Canada	1:03.04	QA
7	3	6	Carolina Colorado Henao	Colombia	1:03.22	QA
8	2	6	Isabella Arcila	Colombia	1:04.30	QA
9	1	6	Cecilia Bertoncello	Argentina	1:04.53	QB
10	1	5	Etiene Medeiros	Brazil	1:04.59	QB
11	3	2	Florencia Perotti	Argentina	1:04.94	QB
12	3	7	Samantha Corea	Canada	1:05.01	QB
13	1	2	Jeserik Pinto	Venezuela	1:05.27	QB
14	2	3	Alana Dillette	Bahamas	1:05.34	QB
15	2	7	Estela Davis	Mexico	1:05.50	QB
16	1	3	Kiera Aitken	Bermuda	1:05.63	QB
17	2	2	Alana Berrocal	Puerto Rico	1:06.09	
18	2	1	Karen Vilorio	Honduras	1:07.06	
19	1	7	Kendese Nangle	Jamaica	1:07.47	
20	3	1	Ines Remersaro	Uruguay	1:07.61	
21	1	1	Laura Rodríguez	Dominican Republic	1:09.51	

=== B Final ===
The B final was also held on October 16.

Rank	Lane	Name	Nationality	Time	Notes
9	4	Cecilia Bertoncello	Argentina	1:03.26	
10	6	Samantha Corea	Canada	1:04.03	
11	3	Florencia Perotti	Argentina	1:04.78	
12	7	Alana Dillette	Bahamas	1:04.85	
12	5	Etiene Medeiros	Brazil	1:04.85	
14	1	Estela Davis	Mexico	1:05.28	
15	2	Jeserik Pinto	Venezuela	1:05.38	
16	8	Kiera Aitken	Bermuda	1:06.12	

=== A Final ===
The A final was also held on October 16.

Rank	Lane	Name	Nationality	Time	Notes
1st place, gold medalist(s)	5	Rachel Bootsma	United States	1:00.37	GR
2nd place, silver medalist(s)	4	Elizabeth Pelton	United States	1:01.12	
3rd place, bronze medalist(s)	3	Maria Fernanda Gonzalez	Mexico	1:02.00	
4	6	Fabiola Molina	Brazil	1:02.04	
5	1	Carolina Colorado Henao	Colombia	1:02.83	
6	7	Gabrielle Soucisse	Canada	1:02.88	
7	2	Gisela Maria Morales	Guatemala	1:03.37	
8	8	Isabella Arcila	Colombia	1:03.80	
