= Bermuda at the Pan American Games =

- Flag of Bermuda
- IOC code: BER
- NOC: Bermuda Olympic Association
- Website: www.olympics.bm
- Medals Ranked 29th: Gold 1 Silver 6 Bronze 5 Total 12

Pan American Games appearances (overview)
- 1967; 1971; 1975; 1979; 1983; 1987; 1991; 1995; 1999; 2003; 2007; 2011; 2015; 2019; 2023

Bermuda at the Pan American Games.

As of the 2023 Pan American Games, Bermuda has won 12 medals (one gold, six silver and five bronze).

== Pan American Games ==
=== Medals by games ===
| Year | Ref. | Edition | Host city | # of athletes | Rank | Gold | Silver | Bronze | Total |
|---|---|---|---|---|---|---|---|---|---|
| 1951 | | I | (Argentina) Buenos Aires | Did not participate | | | | | |
| 1955 | | II | Mexico City | Did not participate | | | | | |
| 1959 | | III | (United States) Chicago | | — | 0 | 0 | 0 | 0 |
| 1963 | | IV | (Brazil) São Paulo | Did not participate | | | | | |
| 1967 | | V | (Canada) Winnipeg | | 14th | 0 | 1 | 1 | 2 |
| 1971 | | VI | (Colombia) Cali | | — | 0 | 0 | 0 | 0 |
| 1975 | | VII | Mexico City | | — | 0 | 0 | 0 | 0 |
| 1979 | | VIII | (Puerto Rico) San Juan | | — | 0 | 0 | 0 | 0 |
| 1983 | | IX | (Venezuela) Caracas | | — | 0 | 0 | 0 | 0 |
| 1987 | | X | (United States) Indianapolis | 72 | 23rd | 0 | 0 | 1 | 1 |
| 1991 | | XI | (Cuba) Havana | 31 | 16th | 0 | 2 | 0 | 2 |
| 1995 | | XII | (Argentina) Mar del Plata | 38 | 29th | 0 | 0 | 1 | 1 |
| 1999 | | XIII | (Canada) Winnipeg | 30 | 16th | 1 | 2 | 0 | 3 |
| 2003 | | XIV | (Dominican Republic) Santo Domingo | 16 | 23rd | 0 | 1 | 0 | 1 |
| 2007 | | XV | (Brazil) Rio de Janeiro | 19 | — | 0 | 0 | 0 | 0 |
| 2011 | | XVI | (Mexico) Guadalajara | 14 | — | 0 | 0 | 0 | 0 |
| 2015 | | XVII | (Canada) Toronto | 16 | 28th | 0 | 0 | 1 | 1 |
| 2019 | | XVIII | (Peru) Lima | 17 | — | 0 | 0 | 0 | 0 |
| 2023 | | XIX | (Chile) Santiago | 11 | 31st | 0 | 0 | 1 | 1 |
| Total | | | | | 29th | 1 | 6 | 5 | 12 |

== Winter Pan American Games ==
=== Medals by games ===
| Year | Ref. | Edition | Host city | Rank | Gold | Silver | Bronze | Total |
|---|---|---|---|---|---|---|---|---|
| 1990 | | I | (Argentina) Las Leñas | Did not participate | | | | |
| Total | | | | — | 0 | 0 | 0 | 0 |

== Junior Pan American Games ==
=== Medals by games ===
| Games | Gold | Silver | Bronze | Total | Rank |
| (Colombia) 2021 Cali-Valle | 0 | 1 | 0 | 1 | 22nd |
| (Paraguay) 2025 Asunción | Future event | | | | |
| Total | 0 | 1 | 0 | 1 | 22nd |

=== Medals by sport ===
| Sport | Gold | Silver | Bronze | Total |
|---|---|---|---|---|
| Cycling | 0 | 1 | 0 | 1 |
| Totals (1 entries) | 0 | 1 | 0 | 1 |

=== Medalists ===
| Medal | Name | Games | Sport | Event |
|---|---|---|---|---|
| Silver | Kaden Hopkins | 2021 Cali-Valle | Cycling | Men's time trial |

== See also ==
- Bermuda at the Olympics
- Bermuda at the Commonwealth Games
