= Michael O'Connor (swimmer) =

Bermudian swimmer (born 1984)

Personal information
- Full name: Michael O'Connor
- Nationality: Bermuda
- Born: 27 April 1984 (age 42) Bermuda
- Height: 5 ft 6 in (1.68 m)

Sport
- Sport: Swimming
- Strokes: Butterfly/Backstroke

Michael O'Connor (born 27 April 1984) is an international-level swimmer from Bermuda. In July 2004, he beat Stephen Fahy with a time of 25.92 seconds to become the Bermuda record holder in the long-course 50 metres butterfly. He was also a member of teams that, as of 2020, held a number of Bermuda Amateur Swimming Association short-course relay records. O'Connor represented Bermuda at the:

- 2003 Island Games (100m backstroke; 50m & 100m butterfly; 4x100m freestyle relay; 4x50m medley relay)
- 2005 World Championships (50m backstroke; 50m & 100m butterfly)
- 2006 Commonwealth Games (50m backstroke; 50m & 100m butterfly)
