= Ottis Steede =

Bermudian footballer

Personal information
- Date of birth: 6 September 1974 (age 52)
- Place of birth: Bermuda
- Position: Midfielder

Team information
- Current team: Dandy Town Hornets

Senior career*
Years	Team	Apps	(Gls)
2001–2003	PHC Zebras		
2003–2005	Southampton Rangers		
2005–	Dandy Town Hornets		

International career^{‡}
2000–2004	Bermuda	12	(q)
- * Club domestic league appearances and goals as of 22 December 2010 ‡ National team caps and goals as of 22 December 2010

Ottis Steede (born 6 September 1974) is a Bermudian international footballer who plays club football for Dandy Town Hornets, as a midfielder. Steede represented Bermuda at the 1995 Pan American Games.
