= Bermuda at the 2015 Pan American Games =

- IOC code: BER
- NOC: Bermuda Olympic Association
- Website: www.olympics.bm

in Toronto, Canada 10–26 July 2015
- Competitors: 16 in 7 sports
- Flag bearer (opening): Julian Fletcher
- Flag bearer (closing): Patrick Nisbett
- Medals Ranked = 28th: Gold 0 Silver 0 Bronze 1 Total 1

Pan American Games appearances (overview)
- 1967; 1971; 1975; 1979; 1983; 1987; 1991; 1995; 1999; 2003; 2007; 2011; 2015; 2019; 2023

Bermuda competed at the 2015 Pan American Games in Toronto, Ontario, Canada from July 10 to 26, 2015. In April 2015, Carlos Lee was named as the chef de mission for the team.

Originally, a squad of seventeen athletes (nine men and eight women) over seven sports was announced on June 16, 2015, by the Bermuda Olympic Association. However, after being originally named to the team, athlete Shianne Smith was dropped. This was done because new qualification standards were set up to reduce the quota from 1,100 to 680 (the original amount allocated to the sport). This mean only nine men and seven women competed for Bermuda, a total of 16 athletes. Swimmer Julian Fletcher was the flagbearer for the team during the opening ceremony.

== Competitors ==
The following table lists Bermuda's delegation per sport and gender.

Sport	Men	Women	Total
Athletics	5	0	5
Cycling	1	1	2
Equestrian	1	2	3
Gymnastics	0	1	1
Sailing	1	1	2
Swimming	1	1	2
Triathlon	0	1	1
Total	9	7	16

== Medalists ==
The following competitors from Bermuda won medals at the games. In the by discipline sections below, medalists' names are bolded.

Medal	Name	Sport	Event	Date
Bronze	Flora Duffy	Triathlon	Women's Triathlon	July 11

**Medals by sport**
**Sport**	1st place, gold medalist(s)	2nd place, silver medalist(s)	3rd place, bronze medalist(s)	**Total**
Triathlon	0	0	1	1
**Total**	**0**	**0**	**1**	**1**

**Medals by day**
**Day**	1st place, gold medalist(s)	2nd place, silver medalist(s)	3rd place, bronze medalist(s)	**Total**
July 11	0	0	0	1
**Total**	**0**	**0**	**1**	**1**

== Athletics ==
Bermuda qualified a total of five athletes (five men).

Key

- Note– Ranks given for track events are for the entire round
- **q** = Qualified for the next round as a fastest loser or, in field events, by position without achieving the qualifying target

Men
Track events

Athlete	Event	Heat		Semi Final		Final	
Athlete	Event	Time	Rank	Time	Rank	Time	Rank
Harold Houston	200 m	21.00	21	did not advance			
Shaquille Dill	800 m	—N/a		1:52.25	14	did not advance	
Aaron Evans	800 m	—N/a		1:40.30	6 **q**	1:49.07	6
Lamont Marshall	1500 m	—N/a				4:00.28	15

Field events

Athlete	Event	Final	
Athlete	Event	Distance	Position
Tyrone Smith	Long Jump	8.07	4

== Cycling ==
Bermuda qualified one female cyclist. The country was later reallocated an additional male cyclist.

Key

- DNF = Did not finish
- DNS = Did not start

=== Road ===
Athlete	Event	Final	
Athlete	Event	Time	Rank
Dominique Mayho	Men's road race	DNF	
Dominique Mayho	Men's time trial	DNF	
Zoenique Williams	Women's road race	DNF	
Zoenique Williams	Women's time trial	DNS	

== Equestrian ==
Bermuda qualified one athlete in dressage and two athletes in jumping, for a total of three competitors.

=== Dressage ===
Athlete	Horse	Event	Round 1		Round 2		Final			
Athlete	Horse	Event	Score	Rank	Score	Rank	Score	Rank	Total Score	Rank
Virginia McKey	Wolkenglanz	Individual	61.421	37	62.816	31	did not advance		124.327	34

=== Jumping ===
Athlete	Horse	Event	Round 1		Round 2			Round 3			Final					
Athlete	Horse	Event	Round 1		Round 2			Round 3			Round A		Round B		Total	
Athlete	Horse	Event	Penalties	Rank	Penalties	Total	Rank	Penalties	Total	Rank	Penalties	Rank	Penalties	Rank	Penalties	Rank
Patrick Nisbett	Quick Z	Individual	0	= 1 **Q**	17	17	45 **Q**	17	34	42 **Q**	8	= 12 **Q**	5	= 8	did not advance	
Jillian Terceira	Tamerino	Individual	0	= 1 **Q**	14	14	43 **Q**	6	20	30 **Q**	20	= 30	did not advance			

== Gymnastics ==
Bermuda qualified one gymnast.

=== Artistic ===
Women

Athlete	Event	Qualification						Final					
Athlete	Event	Apparatus				Total	Rank	Apparatus				Total	Rank
Athlete	Event	F	V	UB	BB	Total	Rank	F	V	UB	BB	Total	Rank
Sydney Mason	All-Around	12.800	9.150	10.100	11.200	43.250	27	12.500	9.600	10.200	11.750	44.050	22

Qualification Legend: Q = Qualified to apparatus final

== Sailing ==
Bermuda qualified one sailor in the laser standard event. The country later received a wildcard in the laser event.

Athlete	Event	Race													Net Points	Final Rank
Athlete	Event	1	2	3	4	5	6	7	8	9	10	11	12	M*	Net Points	Final Rank
Cameron Pimentel	Laser	(15)	10	13	11	12	11	14	15	13	13	12	7	—N/a	131	14
Cecilia Wollmann	Laser Radial	11	12	(14)	2	10	10	6	13	2	12	9	11	—N/a	98	12

== Swimming ==
Bermuda qualified two swimmers (one male and one female).

Key

- Note – Ranks given for swimming events are for all heats
- **FB** = Qualified for the B Finals
- DNS = Did not start

Athlete	Event	Heat		Final	
Athlete	Event	Time	Rank	Time	Rank
Julian Fletcher	Men's 100 m breaststroke	1:03.87	14 **FB**	1:03.60	13
Julian Fletcher	Men's 200 m breaststroke	2:20.97	17	did not advance	
Lisa Blackburn	Women's 100 m breastroke	1:16.14	16 **FB**	1:14.45	13
Lisa Blackburn	Women's 200 m breastroke	2:42.82	14 **FB**	2:46.32	15
Lisa Blackburn	Women's 200 m individual medley	2:29.04	15	DNS	

== Triathlon ==
Bermuda qualified one female triathlete.

Women

Athlete	Event	Swim (1.5 km)	Trans 1	Bike (40 km)	Trans 2	Run (10 km)	Total	Rank
**Flora Duffy**	Individual	18:35	0:39	1:00:51	0:23	35:42	1:57:56	3rd place, bronze medalist(s)

== See also ==
- Bermuda at the 2015 Parapan American Games
- Bermuda at the 2016 Summer Olympics
