= Saint Vincent and the Grenadines at the 2003 Pan American Games =

- IOC code: VIN
- NOC: The St. Vincent and the Grenadines National Olympic Committee
- Website: www.svgnoc.org

in Santo Domingo 1–17 August 2003
- Medals Ranked 32nd: Gold 0 Silver 0 Bronze 0 Total 0

Pan American Games appearances (overview)
- 1991; 1995; 1999; 2003; 2007; 2011; 2015; 2019; 2023

Saint Vincent and the Grenadines participated at the 2003 Pan American Games, held in Santo Domingo, Dominican Republic, from 1 to 17 August 2003.

== Results by event ==
=== Athletics ===
Track

Athlete	Event	Heat		Final	
Athlete	Event	Time	Rank	Time	Rank
Fitz Allan Crick	Men's 400 m hurdles	51.83	13	—	13

Road

Athlete	Event	Time	Rank
Pamenos Ballantyne	Men's marathon	2:29:37	7
Adelaide Carrington	Women's marathon	3:35:02	13

=== Swimming ===
==== Men's competitions ====
Athlete	Event	Heat		Final	
Athlete	Event	Time	Rank	Time	Rank
Stephenson Wallace	50 m freestyle	26.73	30	Did not advance	
Fidel Davis	100 m freestyle	1:02.25	35	Did not advance	

== See also ==
- Saint Vincent and the Grenadines at the 2002 Central American and Caribbean Games
- Saint Vincent and the Grenadines at the 2004 Summer Olympics
