= Saint Vincent and the Grenadines at the 2015 Pan American Games =

- IOC code: VIN
- NOC: The St. Vincent and the Grenadines National Olympic Committee
- Website: www.svgnoc.org

in Toronto, Canada 10–26 July 2015
- Competitors: 5 in 3 sports
- Flag bearer: Kineke Alexander (opening)
- Medals Ranked 28th: Gold 0 Silver 0 Bronze 1 Total 1

Pan American Games appearances (overview)
- 1991; 1995; 1999; 2003; 2007; 2011; 2015; 2019; 2023

Saint Vincent and the Grenadines competed at the 2015 Pan American Games in Toronto, Canada from July 10 to 26, 2015.

A team of five athletes (three men and two women) across three sports (athletics, swimming and for the first time taekwondo) represented the country at the games. This marked an increase of one athlete from the previous edition of the games in 2011.

Before competition began, The Saint Vincent and Grenadines delegation had a pre-games training camp at Georgian College in Barrie, just north of Toronto.

Track and field athlete Kineke Alexander was the flagbearer for the team during the opening ceremony. Alexander also won the country's only medal at the games, a bronze, in the women's 400 metres event. This ranked the country an equal 28th on the medal table.

== Competitors ==
The following table lists the Saint Vincent and the Grenadines delegation per sport and gender.

Sport	Men	Women	Total
Athletics	1	1	2
Swimming	1	1	2
Taekwondo	1	0	1
Total	3	2	5

== Medalists ==
The following competitors from Saint Vincent and the Grenadines won medals at the games. In the by discipline sections below, medalists' names are bolded.

Medal	Name	Sport	Event	Date
Bronze	Kineke Alexander	Athletics	Women's 400m	July 23

**Medals by sport**
**Sport**	1st place, gold medalist(s)	2nd place, silver medalist(s)	3rd place, bronze medalist(s)	**Total**
Athletics	0	0	1	1
**Total**	**0**	**0**	**1**	**1**

**Medals by day**
**Day**	1st place, gold medalist(s)	2nd place, silver medalist(s)	3rd place, bronze medalist(s)	**Total**
July 23	0	0	1	1
**Total**	**0**	**0**	**1**	**1**

== Athletics ==
The Saint Vincent and the Grenadines qualified two athletes.

Key

- Note – Ranks given for track events are for the entire round
- **Q** = Qualified for the next round

Track

Athlete	Event	Heat		Semi Final		Final	
Athlete	Event	Time	Rank	Time	Rank	Time	Rank
Courtney Carl Williams	Men's 200 m	21.35	27	did not advance			
**Kineke Alexander**	Women's 400 m	—N/a		52.24	2 **Q**	51.50	3rd place, bronze medalist(s)

== Swimming ==
The Saint Vincent and the Grenadines received two universality spots (one male and one female).

Key

- Note – Ranks given are for the entire round
- DNS = Did not start

Athlete	Event	Heat		Final	
Athlete	Event	Time	Rank	Time	Rank
Nikolas Sylvester	Men's 50 m freestyle	26.14	19	did not advance	
Nikolas Sylvester	Men's 100 m freestyle	58.29	24	did not advance	
Nikolas Sylvester	Men's 100 m breastroke	1:11.94	20	did not advance	
Izzy Shne Joachim	Women's 50 m freestyle	DNS		did not advance	
Izzy Shne Joachim	Women's 100 m breastroke	1:20.25	17	did not advance	
Izzy Shne Joachim	Women's 200 m breastroke	2:58.72	16	did not advance	

== Taekwondo ==
The Saint Vincent and the Grenadines received a wildcard to enter one male athlete.

Athlete	Event	Round of 16	Quarterfinals	Semifinals	Repechage	Bronze Medal	Final	
Athlete	Event	Opposition Result	Opposition Result	Opposition Result	Opposition Result	Opposition Result	Opposition Result	Rank
Mikhail Charles	Men's 80kg	Medina (VEN); **L** 0–17	did not advance					

== See also ==
- Saint Vincent and the Grenadines at the 2016 Summer Olympics
