= Saint Vincent and the Grenadines at the Pan American Games =

- IOC code: VIN
- NOC: The St. Vincent and the Grenadines National Olympic Committee
- Website: www.svgnoc.org
- Medals Ranked 40th: Gold 0 Silver 0 Bronze 2 Total 2

Pan American Games appearances (overview)
- 1991; 1995; 1999; 2003; 2007; 2011; 2015; 2019; 2023

Saint Vincent and the Grenadines has competed at every edition of the Pan American Games since the eleventh edition of the multi-sport event in 1991. To date, all of Saint Vincent and the Grenadines's medals have been won in the sport of track and field. In 1995, Eswort Coombs won Saint Vincent and the Grenadines first medal, a bronze in the 400 metres track and field event. Kineke Alexander won the country's second medal, a bronze medal in the women's 400 metres in 2015. Saint Vincent and the Grenadines did not compete at the first and only Pan American Winter Games in 1990.

== Medal count ==
Year	Host city	Gold	Silver	Bronze	Total
1991	(Cuba) Havana	0	0	0	0
1995	(Argentina) Mar del Plata	0	0	1	1
1999	(Canada) Winnipeg	0	0	0	0
2003	(Dominican Republic) Santo Domingo	0	0	0	0
2007	(Brazil) Rio de Janeiro	0	0	0	0
2011	(Mexico) Guadalajara	0	0	0	0
2015	(Canada) Toronto	0	0	1	1
2019	(Peru) Lima	0	0	0	0
2023	(Chile) Santiago	0	0	0	0
Total		0	0	2	2

=== Medals by sport ===
Sport	Gold	Silver	Bronze	Total
Athletics	0	0	2	2
Totals (1 entries)	0	0	2	2
