= Bermuda at the 2011 Pan American Games =

- IOC code: BER
- NOC: Bermuda Olympic Association
- Website: www.olympics.bm

in Guadalajara 14–30 October 2011
- Competitors: 14 in 6 sports
- Flag bearer: Malcolm Smith
- Medals: Gold 0 Silver 0 Bronze 0 Total 0

Pan American Games appearances (overview)
- 1967; 1971; 1975; 1979; 1983; 1987; 1991; 1995; 1999; 2003; 2007; 2011; 2015; 2019; 2023

Bermuda competed at the 2011 Pan American Games in Guadalajara, Mexico from October 14 to 30, 2011. Bermuda competed with 14 athletes in six sports.

== Athletics ==
Bermuda has qualified two athletes. However, Bermuda had originally qualified six athletes but four withdrew to rest and prepare for the 2012 Summer Olympics.

Men

Athlete	Event	Heats		Semifinals		Final	
Athlete	Event	Result	Rank	Result	Rank	Result	Rank
Tre Houston	100 m	10.40	11th Q	DSQ		did not advance	
Tre Houston	200 m	21.04	18th Q	20.91	18th PB	did not advance	

Women

Heptathlon	Event	Shianne Smith		
Heptathlon	Event	Results	Points	Rank
	100 m hurdles	14.50 PB	909	10th
	High jump	1.50 m.	621	13th
	Shot put	10.47 m.	560	11th
	200 m	25.04	883	7th
	Long jump	5.63 m. PB	738	6th
	Javelin throw	31.95 m.	514	10th
	800 m	2:15.37 PB	888	1st
Final			5113	10th

== Bowling ==
Bermuda has qualified a full team of 2 male and 2 female bowlers.

Men

Individual

Athlete	Event	Qualification															Eighth Finals	Quarterfinals	Semifinals	Finals	
Athlete	Event	Block 1 (Games 1–6)						Block 2 (Games 7–12)						Total	Average	Rank	Eighth Finals	Quarterfinals	Semifinals	Finals	
Athlete	Event	1	2	3	4	5	6	7	8	9	10	11	12	Total	Average	Rank	Opposition Scores	Opposition Scores	Opposition Scores	Opposition Scores	Rank
Damien Matthews	Men's individual	158	201	180	160	189	146	210	169	171	139	180	236	2139	178.3	31st	did not advance				
LeVinc Samuels	Men's individual	222	192	203	163	211	228	201	201	246	159	220	168	2414	201.2	17th	did not advance				

Pairs

Athlete	Event	Block 1 (Games 1–6)								Block 2 (Games 7–12)								Grand Total	Final Rank
Athlete	Event	1	2	3	4	5	6	Total	Average	7	8	9	10	11	12	Total	Average	Grand Total	Final Rank
LeVinc Samuels; Damien Matthews	Men's pairs	190	219	192	187	192	197	1177	196.2	185	174	193	257	157	236	2379	198.3	4538	12th
LeVinc Samuels; Damien Matthews	Men's pairs	194	188	195	198	168	142	1085	180.8	182	179	170	194	160	189	2159	179.9	4538	12th

Women

Individual

Athlete	Event	Qualification															Eighth Finals	Quarterfinals	Semifinals	Finals	
Athlete	Event	Block 1 (Games 1–6)						Block 2 (Games 7–12)						Total	Average	Rank	Eighth Finals	Quarterfinals	Semifinals	Finals	
Athlete	Event	1	2	3	4	5	6	7	8	9	10	11	12	Total	Average	Rank	Opposition Scores	Opposition Scores	Opposition Scores	Opposition Scores	Rank
June Dill	Women's individual	163	155	137	160	175	170	142	194	186	157	212	197	2048	170.7	26th	did not advance				
Dianne Jones	Women's individual	150	148	178	180	158	174	147	134	177	163	190	168	1967	163.9	28th	did not advance				

Pairs

Athlete	Event	Block 1 (Games 1–6)								Block 2 (Games 7–12)								Grand Total	Final Rank
Athlete	Event	1	2	3	4	5	6	Total	Average	7	8	9	10	11	12	Total	Average	Grand Total	Final Rank
June Dill; Dianne Jones	Women's pairs	162	188	153	158	179	176	1016	169.3	198	147	200	176	157	180	2074	172.4	4003	15th
June Dill; Dianne Jones	Women's pairs	190	177	144	177	162	146	996	166.0	144	159	191	146	118	175	1929	160.8	4003	15th

== Equestrian ==
Bermuda has qualified a team of 1 male and 1 female athlete.

Individual jumping

Athlete	Horse	Event	Ind. 1st Qualifier		Ind. 2nd Qualifier			Ind. 3rd Qualifier			Ind. Final					
Athlete	Horse	Event	Ind. 1st Qualifier		Ind. 2nd Qualifier			Ind. 3rd Qualifier			Round A		Round B		Total	
Athlete	Horse	Event	Penalties	Rank	Penalties	Total	Rank	Penalties	Total	Rank	Penalties	Rank	Penalties	Rank	Penalties	Rank
Patrick Nisbett	Cantaro 32	Individual	6.31	32nd	5.00	11.31	21st	15.00	26.31	36th	did not advance					
Jill Terceira	Bernadien van Westur	Individual	7.24	34th	1.00	8.24	17th	1.00	9.24	11th	5.00	13th	2.00	4th	16.24	8th

== Sailing ==
Bermuda has qualified an athlete, in the sunfish category.

Open

Athlete	Event	Race											Net Points	Final Rank
Athlete	Event	1	2	3	4	5	6	7	8	9	10	M	Net Points	Final Rank
Malcolm Smith	Sunfish class	9	6	4	11	5	11	6	(12)	12	10	/	74.0	10th

== Swimming ==
Bermuda has qualified three swimmers.

Men

Athlete	Event	Heats		Final	
Athlete	Event	Time	Position	Time	Position
Roy-Allan Burch	50 m freestyle	22.96	8th	22.82	7th
Roy-Allan Burch	100 m freestyle	52.87	20th	did not advance	

Women

Athlete	Event	Heats		Final	
Athlete	Event	Time	Position	Time	Position
Kiera Aitken	50 m freestyle	27.27	17th	did not advance	
Kiera Aitken	100 m backstroke	1:05.63	16th	did not advance	
Lisa Blackburn	100 m breaststroke	1:14.33	16th	did not advance	
Lisa Blackburn	200 m breaststroke	2:45.36	13th	did not advance	
Lisa Blackburn	200 m medley	2:31.87	18th	did not advance	

== Triathlon ==
Bermuda has qualified one male and one female triathlete.

Men

Athlete	Event	Swim (1.5 km)	Trans 1	Bike (40 km)	Trans 2	Run(10 km)	Total	Rank
Tyler Butterfield	Individual	19:29; 29th	0:25; 18th	56:44; 4th	0:21; 32nd	33:03; 5th	1:50:03	6th

Women

Athlete	Event	Swim (1.5 km)	Trans 1	Bike (40 km)	Trans 2	Run (10 km)	Total	Rank
Flora Duffy	Individual	20:08; 7th	0:27; 13th	1:03:42; 14th	0:17; 10th	39:02; 7th	2:03:38	8th
