= Quilombo Campinho da Independência =

Quilombo Campinho da Independência is located between the villages of Pedra Azul and Patrimônio, 20 km from the Brazilian municipality of Paraty, in the southern region of the state of Rio de Janeiro. It is bathed by the Carapitanga River and contains waterfalls and forests belonging to the Atlantic Forest.

== Origin ==
The origin of Quilombo Campinho da Independência is very particular. All residents are descendants of three slaves: Antonica, Marcelina and Luiza. According to stories told by the elders, the three were not common slaves, as they had culture, possessions and lived in the big house . It is also said that there were many farms in the area, including the largest one: Fazenda Independência. After the abolition of slavery, farmers abandoned their properties and were then divided among those who worked there.

== Activities ==
=== Crops ===
The quilombolas of Campinho grow a large crop of rice, beans and corn. But they also plant cassava and sugar cane, used to produce various products. Fruits such as mango, soursop and orange are the most abundant.

=== Crafts ===
Most of the residents are artisans, and their baskets, baskets and sieves among other homemade artifacts are appreciated by tourists who visit the Paraty region.

== Historical collection ==
In addition to the history of this quilombo being kept in the memory of older men, passed on to new generations, the tradition of the quilombo can be known at Casa do Quilombo, which has utensils and working materials used by its residents, in addition to a wide collection photographic.

== See also ==
- Quilombo
- Quilombola
