= Blythe Walker =

Bermudian sailor

Personal information
- Nationality: Bermudian
- Born: 12 September 1968 (age 56)

Sport
- Sport: Sailing

Blythe Walker (born 12 September 1968) is a Bermudian sailor. He competed in the men's 470 event at the 1992 Summer Olympics.
