= Jennifer Smatt =

Bermudian swimmer (born 1974)

Personal information
- Born: 13 August 1974 (age 51)

Sport
- Sport: Swimming

Jennifer Smatt (born 13 August 1974) is a Bermudian swimmer. She competed in three events at the 1992 Summer Olympics.

Her family ran a bicycle rental business, Smatt's Cycle Livery. She has one brother.

Smatt is a licensed advisor for Investors in People. As of 2021, she is the president of Ontru, a human resources company.
