= Katura Horton-Perinchief =

Bermudian diver

Personal information
- Nationality: Bermudian
- Born: 26 February 1983 (age 43) Paget, Bermuda

Sport
- Sport: Diving

Katura Horton-Perinchief (born 26 February 1983) is a Bermudian diver. She competed in the women's 3 metre springboard event at the 2004 Summer Olympics. She also competed at the 2002 and 2006 Commonwealth Games. Horton-Perinchief was the first black woman to compete in diving at the Olympics. She was also the first female to compete for Bermuda in diving at the Olympics, and the first Bermudian diver at the Olympics since the 1952 Summer Olympics.

== Biography ==
Horton-Perinchief was born in Paget, Bermuda in 1983. Her mother, Ellen-Kate Horton, represented Bermuda in softball, while her father, Philip Perinchief, was the Attorney General of Bermuda. She began diving in competitions when she was seven years old, at events in Canada, and went to school in Toronto. At the age of fifteen, she was the Canadian National Champion, winning three gold medals across three different events. She went on to represent Bermuda at the 2002 Commonwealth Games and the 2003 Pan American Games.

At the 2004 Summer Olympics in Athens, Horton-Perinchief competed in the women's 3 metre springboard event, finishing in 30th place. She was also the flag bearer for Bermuda at the closing ceremony.

She graduated from the University of Texas at Austin with a BA in French, and became the Diving Team Captain in 2004. She later went to study at George Washington University, where she was recruited as the university's diving coach. She achieved Masters degrees in public health (MPH) and business administration (MBA). She also sits on the board of the Bermuda Olympic Association.

After the Olympics, Horton-Perinchief was forced to retire in 2008 from diving through injuries, arthritis, and a cerebral cyst.
