= Cecilia Wollmann =

Bermudian sailor

Personal information
- Nationality: Bermudian
- Born: 23 January 1998 (age 28)

Sport
- Sport: Sailing

Cecilia Wollmann (born 23 January 1998) is a Bermudian competitive sailor. She competed at the 2016 Summer Olympics in Rio de Janeiro, in the women's Laser Radial.

During the 2019 Pan American Games opening ceremony Wollmann carried the flag of the country as part of the parade of nations.
