= Michael Cash (swimmer) =

Bermudian swimmer (born 1967)

Personal information
- Born: 10 December 1967 (age 58)

Sport
- Sport: Swimming

Michael Cash (born 10 December 1967) is a Bermudian swimmer. He competed in the men's 4 × 100 metre freestyle relay event at the 1992 Summer Olympics.
