= Roy-Allan Burch =

Bermudian swimmer (born 1985)

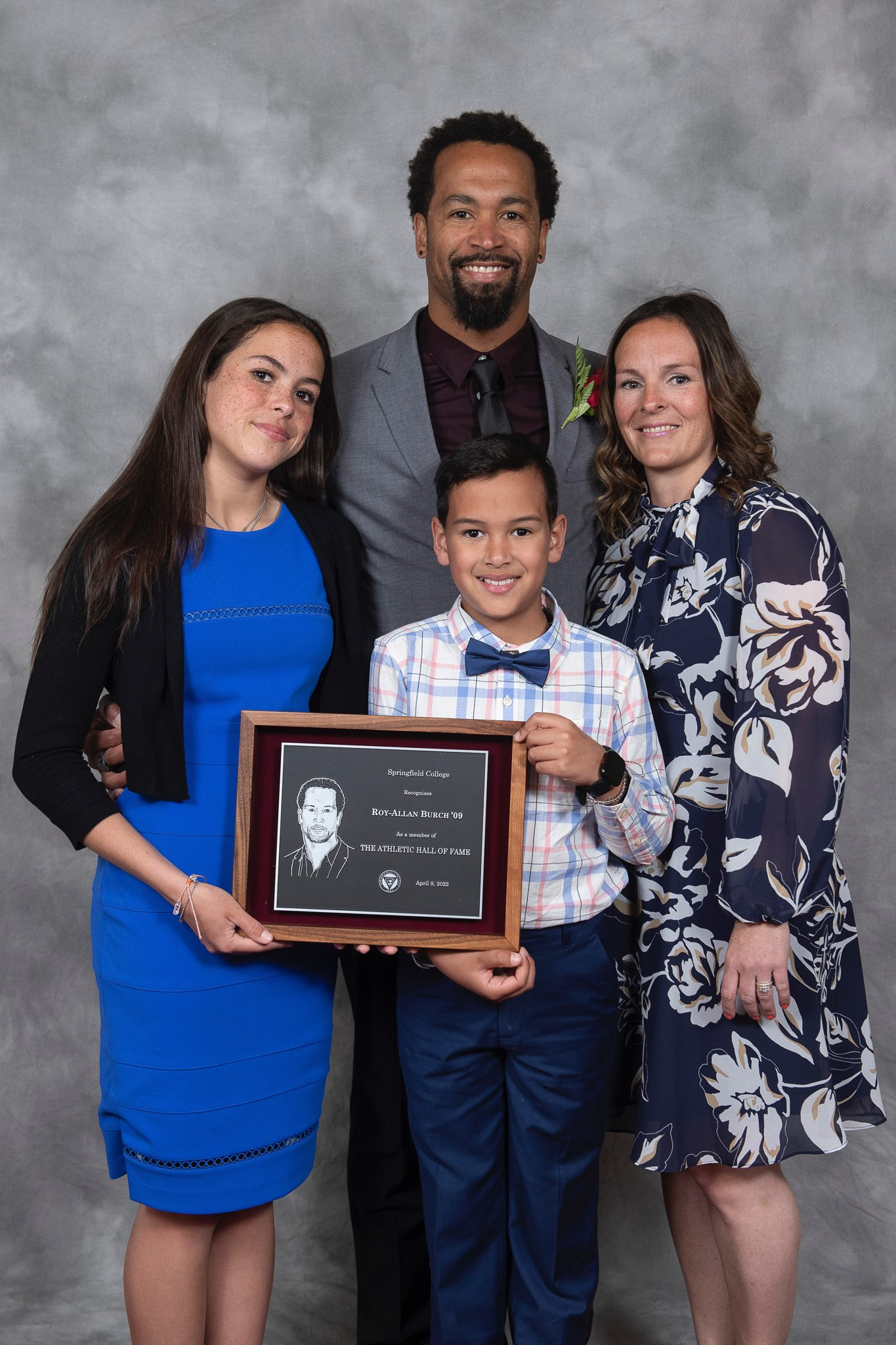

Personal information
- Born: Roy-Allan Saul Burch; 29 November 1985 (age 40) Bermuda
- Height: 1.85 m (6 ft 1 in)
- Weight: 84 kg (185 lb)

Sport
- Country: Bermuda
- Sport: Swimming
- Event: 50m freestyle
- Updated on 21 July 2012

Roy-Allan Saul Burch (born 29 November 1985) is an Olympic and national-record holding swimmer from Bermuda. He swam for Bermuda at the 2008 Olympics and 2012 Olympics.

At the 2011 World Championships, he swam to new Bermuda Records in the 50 and 100 frees (22.69 and 51.01).

In March 2011, in preparation for the 2012 Olympics, Burch moved to Charlotte, North Carolina in the USA to train under coach David Marsh.

An accident ended his competitive career. His attention is now on family and community.

He has swum for Bermuda at:

- Olympics: 2008, 2012
- World Championships: 2007, 2009, 2011, 2013
- Commonwealth Games: 2002, 2010, 2014
- Pan American Games: 2007, 2011
