= Elliot Hubbard =

Bermudian cyclist

Personal information
- Born: 19 September 1973 (age 53)

Cycling career
- Sport: Cycling

Elliot Hubbard (born 19 September 1973) is a Bermudian former cyclist. He competed in the men's individual road race at the 1996 Summer Olympics.
