= Kennice Greene =

Vincentian and Grenadian swimmer (born 2007)

Kennice Aphenie Greene (born 6 July 2007) is a Vincentian Grenadian swimmer. She represented Saint Vincent and the Grenadines at the 2024 Summer Olympics, competing in the women's 50m freestyle where she qualified via universality place, a system where Olympic-level athletes from underrepresented countries receive automatic bids. She swims collegiately at the University of North Carolina at Pembroke.
