= Rebecca Heyliger =

Bermudian swimmer (born 1992)

Personal information
- Nationality: Bermudian
- Born: 24 November 1992 (age 33)

Sport
- Sport: Swimming

Rebecca Heyliger (born 24 November 1992) is a Bermudian swimmer. She competed in the women's 50 metre freestyle event at the 2016 Summer Olympics where she ranked 52nd with a time of 26.54 seconds. She did not advance to the semifinals.
