= Geri Mewett =

Bermudian swimmer (born 1974)

Personal information
- Born: 23 November 1974 (age 51)

Sport
- Sport: Swimming

Geri Mewett (born 23 August 1974) is a Bermudian swimmer and cyclist. He competed in three events at the 1992 Summer Olympics.
