= Maddy Moore =

Bermudian swimmer (born 2000)

Personal information
- Full name: Madelyn Moore
- Nationality: Bermudian
- Born: 17 May 2000 (age 26)

Sport
- Sport: Swimming
Medal record
Representing Bermuda
Central American and Caribbean Games
Silver medal – second place	2023 San Salvador	50m freestyle

Maddy Moore (born 17 May 2000) is a Bermudian swimmer. She competed in the women's 50 metre freestyle and women's 50 metre butterfly events at the 2019 World Aquatics Championships held in Gwangju, South Korea. In both events she did not advance to compete in the semi-finals. She also represented Bermuda at the 2022 World Aquatics Championships held in Budapest, Hungary.

In 2018, she competed in the girls' 50 metre backstroke event at the Summer Youth Olympics held in Buenos Aires, Argentina. She did not qualify to compete in the semi-finals. She also competed in the girls' 50 metre butterfly, girls' 50 metre freestyle and girls' 100 metre freestyle events.

She represented Bermuda at the 2022 Commonwealth Games held in Birmingham, England.
