= Bermuda at the 2011 World Aquatics Championships =

Sporting event delegation

Flag of Bermuda

Bermuda competed at the 2011 World Aquatics Championships in Shanghai, China between July 16 and 31, 2011.

== Swimming ==
Bermuda qualified 3 swimmers.

Men

Athlete	Event	Heats		Semifinals		Final	
Athlete	Event	Time	Rank	Time	Rank	Time	Rank
Roy-Allan Burch	Men's 50m Freestyle	22.69	28	did not advance			
Roy-Allan Burch	Men's 100m Freestyle	51.01	47	did not advance			
Julian Fletcher	Men's 50m Breaststroke	29.11	36	did not advance			
Julian Fletcher	Men's 100m Breaststroke	1:05.00	64	did not advance			

Women

Athlete	Event	Heats		Semifinals		Final	
Athlete	Event	Time	Rank	Time	Rank	Time	Rank
Kiera Aitken	Women's 50m Freestyle	27.38	43	did not advance			
Kiera Aitken	Women's 100m Freestyle	59.39	48	did not advance			
Kiera Aitken	Women's 50m Backstroke	29.78	39	did not advance			
Kiera Aitken	Women's 100m Backstroke	1:03.59	38	did not advance			
