= Malcolm Smith (sailor) =

Bermudian sailor

Personal information
- Nationality: Bermudian
- Born: 23 January 1959 (age 67)

Sailing career
- Sport: Sailing
- Class(es): Sunfish, ILCA 7, Byte
Medal record
Sailing
Representing Bermuda
Pan American Games
| Silver medal – second place | 2003 Santo Domingo | Sunfish class |

Malcolm Smith (born 23 January 1959) is a Bermudian sailor. He competed in the Laser event at the 1996 Summer Olympics.
