= Flag of Bermuda =

British territorial flag

Bermuda
- Flag of Bermuda
- Use: Civil and state flag, civil ensign
- Proportion: 1:2
- Adopted: 4 October 1910 (modified coat of arms on 25 January 1999)
- Design: Red Ensign with the coat of arms of Bermuda in the fly.
- Government Ensign of Bermuda
- Use: State ensign
- Proportion: 1:2
- Design: Blue Ensign with the coat of arms of Bermuda in the fly.
- Flag of the governor of Bermuda
- Use: Other
- Proportion: 1:2
- Design: A Union Flag defaced with the coat of arms of Bermuda.

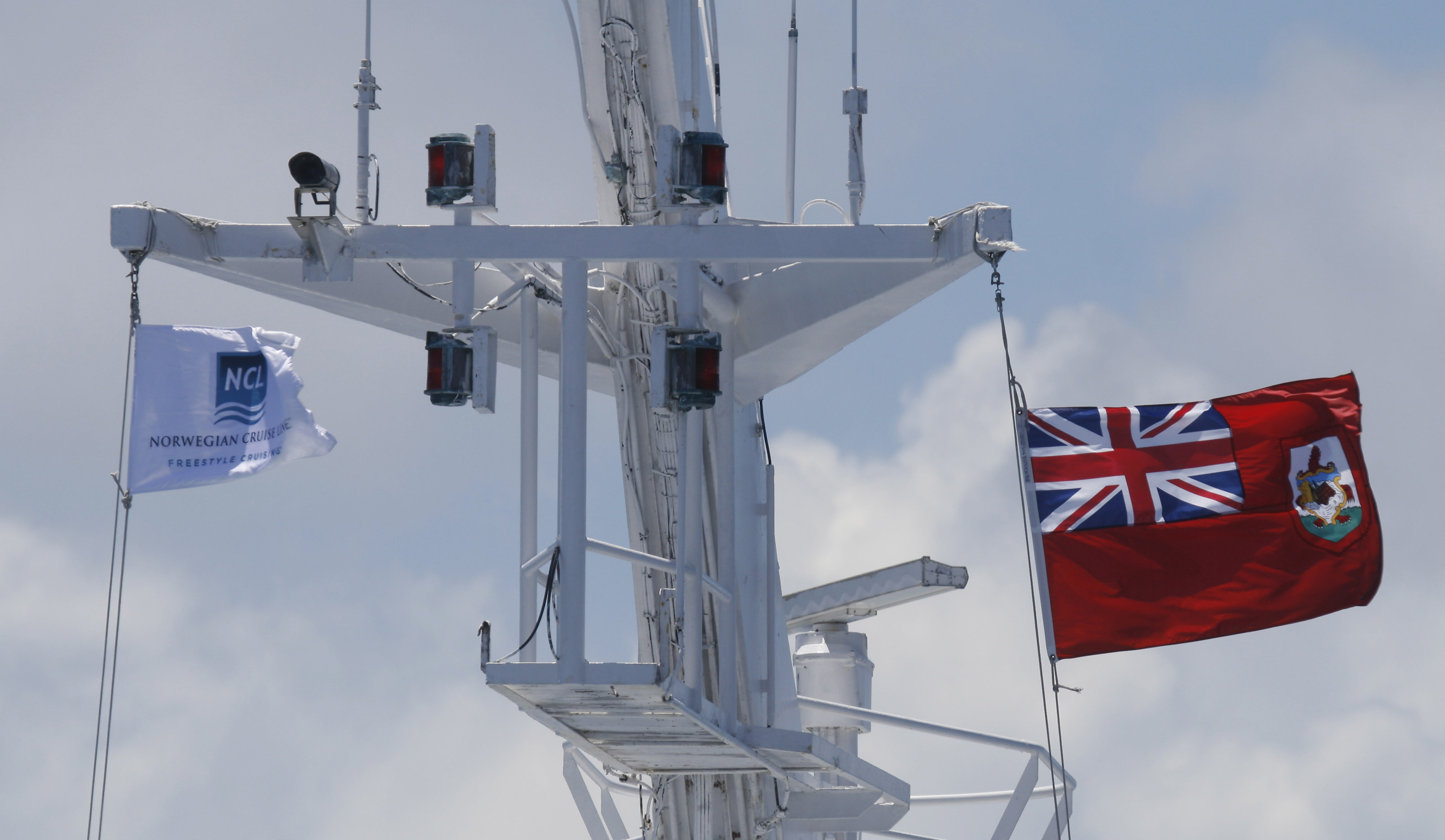
Flag of Bermuda flown on a ship.

The flag of the British Overseas Territory of Bermuda as a red ensign was first adopted on 4 October 1910. It is a British Red Ensign with the Union Jack (which is the national flag) in the upper left corner, and the coat of arms of Bermuda in the lower right. Prior to this like most of the British colonies at the time it adopted a blue ensign with a seal that depicted a dry dock with three sailing ships. In 1999, the flag was changed to its current form, with an enlarged coat of arms.

== Description ==
The flag is unusual for a British overseas territory in that it is used on land in a red ensign form; most other British overseas territories use a version of the Blue Ensign for general use ashore. Bermuda's use of a red ensign on land is in keeping with Canada (pre-1965) and the Union of South Africa (pre-1928), both of which used red ensigns ashore as local flags in the early part of the 20th century. Bermuda's flag is an appropriate civil ensign for vessels registered on the Bermuda portion of the British Register, by virtue of the Bermuda Merchant Shipping Act of 2002. The Governor of Bermuda uses a Union Flag defaced with the coat of arms, a design that shows the shipwreck of the Sea Venture in 1609.

Flag of the governor of Bermuda

Flag of 1875 – 1910

Flag of 1910 – 1999

Government Ensign of Bermuda

Government Ensign of Bermuda (1910-1999)

== Coat of arms ==
The Latin inscription on the coat of arms reads Quo Fata Ferunt ("Whither the Fates Carry"). The coat of arms shows a lion holding a shield which bears a picture of a shipwreck on a rock.

== See also ==
- List of British flags
- Canadian Red Ensign
  - Flag of Ontario
  - Flag of Manitoba
- Flags of British India
- Flag of the Dominion of Newfoundland
- Flag of Mandatory Palestine
- South African Red Ensign
- Flag of Tanganyika Territory
