= List of flag bearers for Bermuda at the Olympics =

Bermuda at the Olympics
- IOC code: BER
- NOC: Bermuda Olympic Association
- Website: www.olympics.bm
- Medals: Gold 1 Silver 0 Bronze 1 Total 2

Summer appearances
- 1936; 1948; 1952; 1956; 1960; 1964; 1968; 1972; 1976; 1980; 1984; 1988; 1992; 1996; 2000; 2004; 2008; 2012; 2016; 2020; 2024

Winter appearances
- 1992; 1994; 1998; 2002; 2006; 2010; 2014; 2018; 2022–2026

This is a list of flag bearers who have represented Bermuda at the Olympics.

Flag bearers carry the national flag of their country at the opening ceremony of the Olympic Games.

#	Event year	Season	Flag bearer	Sport
1	1936	Summer	Perez Sord (Note: Sources differ and Hayward may have been the flagbearer according to Olympedia.)	Rowing (did not compete)
2	1948	Summer	Whitfield "Chummy" Hayward	Official
3	1952	Summer	Whitfield "Chummy" Hayward	Official
4	1956	Summer		
5	1960	Summer	Whitfield "Chummy" Hayward	Official
6	1964	Summer	Whitfield "Chummy" Hayward	Official
7	1968	Summer	Whitfield "Chummy" Hayward	Official
8	1972	Summer	Kirk Cooper	Sailing
9	1976	Summer		
10	1984	Summer	Nick Saunders	Athletics
11	1988	Summer	Nick Saunders	Athletics
12	1992	Winter	John Hoskins	Official
13	1992	Summer	Brian Wellman	Athletics
14	1994	Winter	John Hoskins	Official
15	1996	Summer	Brian Wellman	Athletics
16	1998	Winter	John Hoskins	Official
17	2000	Summer	Mary Jane Tumbridge	Equestrian
18	2002	Winter	Patrick Singleton	Luge
19	2004	Summer	Peter Bromby	Sailing
20	2006	Winter	Patrick Singleton	Skeleton
21	2008	Summer	Jill Terciera	Equestrian
22	2010	Winter	Tucker Murphy	Cross-country skiing
23	2012	Summer	Zander Kirkland	Sailing
24	2014	Winter	Tucker Murphy	Cross-country skiing
25	2016	Summer	Tyrone Smith	Athletics
26	2018	Winter	Tucker Murphy	Cross-country skiing
27	2020	Summer	Dara Alizadeh	Rowing
28	2024	Summer	Adriana Penruddocke	Sailing
28	2024	Summer	Jah-Nhai Perinchief	Athletics

== See also ==
- Bermuda at the Olympics
