= Bermuda at the 1992 Summer Olympics =

- IOC code: BER
- NOC: Bermuda Olympic Association

in Barcelona
- Competitors: 20 in 4 sports
- Flag bearer: Brian Wellman
- Medals: Gold 0 Silver 0 Bronze 0 Total 0

Summer Olympics appearances (overview)
- 1936; 1948; 1952; 1956; 1960; 1964; 1968; 1972; 1976; 1980; 1984; 1988; 1992; 1996; 2000; 2004; 2008; 2012; 2016; 2020; 2024

Bermuda competed at the 1992 Summer Olympics in Barcelona, Spain.

== Competitors ==
The following is the list of number of competitors in the Games.

Sport	Men	Women	Total
Athletics	3	1	4
Equestrian	0	3	3
Sailing	6	1	7
Swimming	5	1	6
Total	14	6	20

== Athletics ==
Men
Track & road events

Athlete	Event	Heat		Quarterfinal		Semifinal		Final	
Athlete	Event	Result	Rank	Result	Rank	Result	Rank	Result	Rank
Troy Douglas	400 m	46.02	1 Q	45.67	3 Q	45.59	6	did not advance	

Field events

Athlete	Event	Qualification		Final	
Athlete	Event	Distance	Position	Distance	Position
Clarence Nick Saunders	High jump	NM		did not advance	
Brian Wellman	Triple jump	17.16	6 q	17.24	5

Women
Track & road events

Athlete	Event	Heat		Quarterfinal		Semifinal		Final	
Athlete	Event	Result	Rank	Result	Rank	Result	Rank	Result	Rank
Dawnette Douglas	100 m	12.05	41	did not advance					
Dawnette Douglas	200 m	25.03	31	did not advance					

== Equestrian ==
=== Dressage ===
Athlete	Horse	Event	Grand Prix				Total	
Athlete	Horse	Event	Qualification		Final		Total	
Athlete	Horse	Event	Total	Rank	Total	Rank	Total	Rank
Suzanne Dunkley	Elliot	Individual	1486	29	did not advance			

=== Eventing ===
Athlete	Horse	Event	Eventing								Total	
Athlete	Horse	Event	Dressage		Cross-country			Jumping			Total	
Athlete	Horse	Event	Penalties	Rank	Penalties	Total	Rank	Penalties	Total	Rank	Total	Rank
Nicki DeSousa	Prairie King	Individual	68.20	54	107.60	175.80	54	10	185.80	45	185.80	45
Mary Jane Tumbridge	Bermuda's Option	Individual	58.40	21	55.20	113.60	22	WD			DNF	

== Sailing ==
Men

Athlete	Event	Race							Net points	Final rank
Athlete	Event	1	2	3	4	5	6	7	Net points	Final rank
Blythe Walker; Ray DeSilva	470	~~PMS~~	19	18	21	32	26	20	172.0	30

Women

Athlete	Event	Race							Net points	Final rank
Athlete	Event	1	2	3	4	5	6	7	Net points	Final rank
Paula Lewin	Europe	16	19	15	~~20~~	16	17	20	139.0	21

Open

Athlete	Event	Race							Net points	Final rank
Athlete	Event	1	2	3	4	5	6	7	Net points	Final rank
Jay Kempe; Reid Kempe	Tornado	19	14	19	20	20	~~DNC~~	17	145.0	20
Paul Fisher; Peter Bromby	Star	10	~~20~~	16	13	15	18	11	119.0	19

== Swimming ==
Men

Athlete	Event	Heat		Semifinal		Final	
Athlete	Event	Time	Rank	Time	Rank	Time	Rank
Chris Flook	100 m breaststroke	1:04.93	33	did not advance			
Chris Flook	200 m breaststroke	2:24.85	39	did not advance			
Geri Mewett	50 m freestyle	24.20	44	did not advance			
Geri Mewett	100 m freestyle	53.14	50	did not advance			
Ian Raynor	50 m freestyle	24.23	45	did not advance			
Ian Raynor	100 m freestyle	53.16	51	did not advance			
Ian Raynor	100 m butterfly	59.03	56	did not advance			
Ian Raynor; Mike Cash; Craig Morbey; Geri Mewett	4 × 100 m freestyle relay	3:31.17	15	did not advance			

Women

Athlete	Event	Heat		Semifinal		Final	
Athlete	Event	Time	Rank	Time	Rank	Time	Rank
Jenny Smatt	100 m breaststroke	1:13.94	28	did not advance			
Jenny Smatt	200 m breaststroke	2:42.25	32	did not advance			
Jenny Smatt	200 m individual medley	2:29.29	38	did not advance			

== See also ==
- Bermuda at the 1991 Pan American Games
