= Bermuda at the 1976 Summer Olympics =

- IOC code: BER
- NOC: Bermuda Olympic Association

in Montreal Canada
- Competitors: 16 (15 men and 1 woman) in 3 sports
- Medals Ranked 37th: Gold 0 Silver 0 Bronze 1 Total 1

Summer Olympics appearances (overview)
- 1936; 1948; 1952; 1956; 1960; 1964; 1968; 1972; 1976; 1980; 1984; 1988; 1992; 1996; 2000; 2004; 2008; 2012; 2016; 2020; 2024

Bermuda competed at the 1976 Summer Olympics in Montreal, Quebec, Canada.

== Medalists ==
Medal	Name	Sport	Event	Date
Bronze	Clarence Hill	Boxing	Heavyweight	29 July

== Athletics ==
Men
Track & road events

Athlete	Event	Heat		Quarterfinal		Semifinal		Final	
Athlete	Event	Result	Rank	Result	Rank	Result	Rank	Result	Rank
Calvin Dill	200 m	22.38	4 Q	21.40	6	did not advance			
Michael Sharpe	100 m	10.70	4	did not advance					
Gregory Simons	100 m	10.76	5	did not advance					
Raymond Swan	Marathon	—						2:39:18	58
Renelda Swan	400 m	49.13	6	did not advance					
Dennis Trott	100 m	10.67	5 q	10.64	5	did not advance			
Michael Sharpe; Dennis Trott; Calvin Dill; Gregory Simons	4 × 100 m relay	39.90	4 Q	—		39.78	5	did not advance	

Field events

Athlete	Event	Qualification		Final	
Athlete	Event	Distance	Position	Distance	Position
Clark Godwin (Note: also competed at the 1972 and 1973 CARIFTA Games, the 1974 Commonwealth Games, the 1975 Pan American Games and the 1975 and 1977 Central American and Caribbean Championships in Athletics)	High jump	2.05	32	did not advance	

Women
Track & road events

Athlete	Event	Heat		Quarterfinal		Semifinal		Final	
Athlete	Event	Result	Rank	Result	Rank	Result	Rank	Result	Rank
Debbie Jones	100 m	11.84	5 Q	DNS		did not advance			

== Boxing ==
Men

Athlete	Event	1 Round	2 Round	Quarterfinals	Semifinals	Final	
Athlete	Event	Opposition Result	Opposition Result	Opposition Result	Opposition Result	Opposition Result	Rank
Robert Burgess	Light Heavyweight	BYE	Seifu Mekonnen (ETH)*; W WO	Kostică Dafinoiu (ROU); L 0-5	did not advance		5
Clarence Hill	Heavyweight	BYE	Parviz Badpa (IRN); W KO-3	Raudy Gauwe (BEL); W 5-0	Mircea Şimon (ROU); L 0-5	did not advance	3rd place, bronze medalist(s)

== Sailing ==
Open

Athlete	Event	Race							Net points	Final rank
Athlete	Event	1	2	3	4	5	6	7	Net points	Final rank
Howard Lee	Finn	26	RET	17	~~DSQ~~	20	24	24	175.0	26
Eugene Simmons; Larry Lindo	470	15	9	~~23~~	22	14	11	9	116.0	17
Richard Belvin; Gordon Flood; Raymond Pitman	Soling	12	18	~~RET~~	22	10	22	21	141.0	21
