= Bermuda at the 1988 Summer Olympics =

- IOC code: BER
- NOC: Bermuda Olympic Association

in Seoul
- Competitors: 12 (11 men, 1 woman) in 6 sports
- Flag bearer: Clarence Saunders
- Medals: Gold 0 Silver 0 Bronze 0 Total 0

Summer Olympics appearances (overview)
- 1936; 1948; 1952; 1956; 1960; 1964; 1968; 1972; 1976; 1980; 1984; 1988; 1992; 1996; 2000; 2004; 2008; 2012; 2016; 2020; 2024

Bermuda was represented at the 1988 Summer Olympics in Seoul, South Korea by the Bermuda Olympic Association.

In total, 12 athletes including 11 men and one woman represented Bermuda in six different sports including athletics, boxing, equestrian, sailing, swimming and tennis.

== Competitors ==
In total, 12 athletes represented Bermuda at the 1988 Summer Olympics in Seoul, South Korea across six different sports.

Sport	Men	Women	Total
Athletics	5	0	5
Boxing	1	–	1
Equestrian	1	1	2
Sailing	2	0	2
Swimming	1	0	1
Tennis	1	0	1
Total	11	1	12

== Athletics ==
In total, five Bermudan athletes participated in the athletics events – Troy Douglas in the men's 200 m and the men's 400 m, Bill Trott in the men's 100 m, Clarence Nick Saunders in the men's high jump, Mike Watson in the men's 800 m and the men's 1,500 m and Brian Wellman in the men's triple jump.

The heats for the men's 100 m took place on 23 September 1988. Trott finished seventh in his heat in a time of 10.69 seconds and he did not advance to the quarter-finals.

The heats for the men's 800 m took place on 23 September 1988. Watson finished fifth in his heat in a time of one minute 50.16 seconds and he did not advance to the quarter-finals.

The heats for the men's 400 m took place on 24 September 1988. Douglas finished second in his heat in a time of 45.69 seconds as he advanced to the quarter-finals. The quarter-finals took place on 25 September 1988. Douglas finished eighth in his quarter-final in a time of 46.28 and he did not advance to the semi-finals.

The heats for the men's 200 m took place on 26 September 1988. Douglas finished second in his heat in a time of 20.91 seconds as he advanced to the quarter-finals. The quarter-finals took place later the same day. Douglas finished third in his quarter-final in a time of 20.7 as he advanced to the semi-finals. The semi-finals took place on 28 September 1988. Douglas finished eighth in his semi-final in a time of 20.84 and he did not advance to the final.

The heats for the men's 1,500 m took place on 29 September 1988. Watson finished 10th in his heat in a time of three minutes 46.49 seconds and he did not advance to the semi-finals.

Athlete	Event	Heat		Quarterfinal		Semifinal		Final	
Athlete	Event	Result	Rank	Result	Rank	Result	Rank	Result	Rank
Troy Douglas	200 m	20.91	2 Q	20.70	3 Q	20.84	8	did not advance	
Troy Douglas	400 m	45.69	2 Q	46.28	8	did not advance			
Bill Trott	100 m	10.69	87	did not advance					
Mike Watson	800 m	1:50.16	45	did not advance					
Mike Watson	1,500 m	3:46.49	39	did not advance					

The qualifying round for the men's triple jump took place on 23 September 1988. Wellman contested qualifying group B. His best jump of 15.47 m came on his third and final attempt but it was ultimately not far enough to advance to the final and he finished 34th overall.

The qualifying round for the men's high jump took place on 24 September 1988. Saunders contested qualifying group A. He passed 2.28 m on his first attempt and advanced to the final in fourth place. The final took place the following day. Saunders passed 2.34 m on his first attempt but his attempts at 2.36 m and 2.38 m failed and he finished fifth overall – 2 cm behind the bronze medal winners.

Athlete	Event	Qualification		Final	
Athlete	Event	Distance	Position	Distance	Position
Clarence Nick Saunders	High jump	2.28	4 Q	2.34	5
Brian Wellman	Triple jump	15.47	33	did not advance	

== Boxing ==
In total, one Bermudan athlete participated in the boxing events – Quinn Paynter in the light middleweight category.

The first round of the light middleweight category took place on 20 September 1988. Paynter received a bye to the second round. The second round took place on 24 September 1988. Paynter defeated Johnny de Lima of Denmark to advance. The third round took place on 26 September 1988. Paynter lost to Vincenzo Nardiello of Italy.

Athlete	Event	1 Round	2 Round	3 Round	Quarterfinals	Semifinals	Final
Athlete	Event	Opposition Result	Opposition Result	Opposition Result	Opposition Result	Opposition Result	Rank
Quinn Paynter	Light middleweight	BYE	Johnny de Lima (DEN); W RSC-3	Vincenzo Nardiello (ITA); L KO-2	did not advance		

== Equestrian ==
In total, two Bermudan athletes participated in the equestrian events – Carol Ann Blackman and Peter S. Gray in the eventing individual.

The eventing individual took place from 19 to 22 September 1988. Gray was ranked 37th in the dressage, 32nd in the cross-country and 30th in the show jumping as he finished in 31st place. Blackman did not finish.

Athlete	Horse	Event	Eventing								Total	
Athlete	Horse	Event	Dressage		Cross-country			Jumping			Total	
Athlete	Horse	Event	Penalties	Rank	Penalties	Total	Rank	Penalties	Total	Rank	Total	Rank
Carol Ann Blackman	Sneak Preview	Individual	92.60	47	DNF			did not advance			DNF	
Peter S. Gray	Somers	Individual	75.60	37	149.60	225.20	33	15.50	240.70	31	240.70	31

== Sailing ==
In total, two Bermudan athletes participated in the sailing events – Eddie Bardgett and Glenn Astwood in the tornado.

The seven races in the tornado took place from 20 to 27 September 1988. Bardgett and Astwood recorded their best finish in race five when they placed 12th. In total, the pair accumulated a net 135 points and finished 18th overall.

Athlete	Event	Race							Net points	Final rank
Athlete	Event	1	2	3	4	5	6	7	Net points	Final rank
Eddie Bardgett; Glenn Astwood	Tornado	17	15	18	20	12	17	~~RET~~	135.0	18

== Swimming ==
In total, one Bermudan athlete participated in the swimming events – Victor Ruberry in the men's 100 m breaststroke.

The heats for the men's 100 m breaststroke took place on 18 September 1988. Ruberry finished eighth in his heat in a time of one minute 9.49 seconds which was ultimately not fast enough to advance to the finals.

Athlete	Event	Heat		Semifinal		Final	
Athlete	Event	Time	Rank	Time	Rank	Time	Rank
Victor Ruberry	100 m breaststroke	1:09.49	53	did not advance			

== Tennis ==
In total, one Bermudan athlete participated in the tennis events – Stephen Alger in the men's singles.

The first round of the men's singles took place on 20 and 21 September 1988. Alger lost in straight sets, 6–3 6–4 6–2, to Jakob Hlasek of Switzerland.

Athlete	Event	Round of 64	Round of 32	Round of 16	Quarterfinals	Semifinals	Final / BM	
Athlete	Event	Opposition Score	Opposition Score	Opposition Score	Opposition Score	Opposition Score	Opposition Score	Rank
Stephen Alger	Singles	Jakob Hlasek (SUI); L 3–6, 4–6, 2-6	did not advance					
