= Bermuda at the 1960 Summer Olympics =

- IOC code: BER
- NOC: Bermuda Olympic Association

in Rome
- Competitors: 9 in 1 sport
- Flag bearer: Whitfield Fredrick Hayward
- Medals: Gold 0 Silver 0 Bronze 0 Total 0

Summer Olympics appearances (overview)
- 1936; 1948; 1952; 1956; 1960; 1964; 1968; 1972; 1976; 1980; 1984; 1988; 1992; 1996; 2000; 2004; 2008; 2012; 2016; 2020; 2024

Bermuda competed at the 1960 Summer Olympics in Rome, Italy.

== Sailing ==
Open

Athlete	Event	Race							Net points	Final rank
Athlete	Event	1	2	3	4	5	6	7	Net points	Final rank
Brownlow Gray	Finn	29	~~DNF~~	29	21	32	27	18	1433	32
John Trimingham de Forest; Richard H. Divall	Flying Dutchman	23	7	~~24~~	18	16	19	4	3007	16
Howard B. Eve; James W. Kempe; Richard H. Masters	Dragon	~~25~~	5	7	14	16	16	14	2948	15
Albert F. Darrell; Walter J. Jones; Norman C. Jones	5.5 Metre	17	7	~~DNF~~	18	7	4	16	2297	12
