= Bermuda at the 2012 Summer Olympics =

- IOC code: BER
- NOC: Bermuda Olympic Association
- Website: www.olympics.bm

in London
- Competitors: 8 in 5 sports
- Flag bearers: Zander Kirkland (opening); Flora Duffy (closing)
- Medals: Gold 0 Silver 0 Bronze 0 Total 0

Summer Olympics appearances (overview)
- 1936; 1948; 1952; 1956; 1960; 1964; 1968; 1972; 1976; 1980; 1984; 1988; 1992; 1996; 2000; 2004; 2008; 2012; 2016; 2020; 2024

Bermuda competed at the 2012 Summer Olympics in London, United Kingdom from 27 July to 12 August 2012. This was the territory's seventeenth appearance at the Olympics, having missed the 1980 Summer Olympics in Moscow.

The Bermuda Olympic Association sent a total of 8 athletes to the Games, 5 men and 3 women, to compete in athletics, equestrian, sailing, swimming, and triathlon. Five of them had competed in Beijing, but failed to advance past the first round of their events. Triathlete Tyler Butterfield made an Olympic return from the 2004 Summer Olympics in Athens, after an unsuccessful attempt to qualify for the Beijing games. Open skiff sailor Zander Kirkland, competing at his first Olympics, was the nation's flag bearer at the opening ceremony.

Bermuda, however, failed to win its first Olympic medal since the 1976 Summer Olympics in Montreal, where Clarence Hill won the bronze for boxing. Long jumper Tyrone Smith qualified for the final rounds, but finished down the standings.

== Athletics ==
Athletes must achieve certain standards in order to qualify to the Olympics (up to a maximum of 3 athletes in each event at the 'A' Standard, and 1 at the 'B' Standard)): Bermuda's Tyrone Smith was able to reach the B standard while Arantxa King was given a wild card entry. Tyrone Smith qualified to the finals in long jump by finishing tenth with a jump of 7.97m. However, Smith missed out of the medal standings after he failed to jump twice of his three attempts, finishing only in twelfth place. Arantxa King, on the other hand, initially finished a twelfth-place tie in the long jump. However, she narrowly missed out of the final rounds by just a centimeter short from Belarus' Veronika Shutkova, who performed her second best jump.

Men

Athlete	Event	Qualification		Final	
Athlete	Event	Distance	Position	Distance	Position
Tyrone Smith	Long jump	7.97	10 q	7.70	12

Women

Athlete	Event	Qualification		Final	
Athlete	Event	Distance	Position	Distance	Position
Arantxa King	Long jump	6.40	13	Did not advance	

Key

- Note–Ranks given for track events are within the athlete's heat only
- Q = Qualified for the next round
- q = Qualified for the next round as a fastest loser or, in field events, by position without achieving the qualifying target
- NR = National record
- N/A = Round not applicable for the event
- Bye = Athlete not required to compete in round

== Equestrian ==
Bermuda has qualified one rider in the show jumping event, based on its performance at the 2011 Pan American Games. Jillian Terceira, and her horse Bernadien van Westuur reached the second round where they knocked down two fences with an 8-point penalty; thus, the combined two round penalties caused her to fall short in order to reach the third round, and Terceira was eliminated from the competition.

=== Jumping ===
Athlete	Horse	Event	Qualification								Final					
Athlete	Horse	Event	Round 1		Round 2			Round 3			Round A		Round B		Total	
Athlete	Horse	Event	Penalties	Rank	Penalties	Total	Rank	Penalties	Total	Rank	Penalties	Rank	Penalties	Rank	Penalties	Rank
Jillian Terceira	Bernadien van Westuur	Individual	1	=33 Q	8	9	=47	Did not advance							9	=47

== Sailing ==
Bermuda has qualified a boat at the 49er event. Sailors Jesse Kirkland and Zander Kirkland qualified by their performance at the 2012 49er World Championship. After a bad start to their Olympic campaign, including four races in which they did not finish, the Kirkland brothers improved their performance and ended with three top 10 performances. However, their improved performance was not enough to advance into the medal round and finished in last place. After the Olympics, the Kirkland brothers announced their break-up and placed their boat up for sale.

Open

Athlete	Event	Race																Net points	Final rank
Athlete	Event	1	2	3	4	5	6	7	8	9	10	11	12	13	14	15	M*	Net points	Final rank
Jesse Kirkland; Zander Kirkland	49er	~~21~~; ~~DNF~~	19	18	21; DNF	21; DNF	12	6	21; DNF	6	10	12	19	2	19	18	EL	204	19

M = Medal race; EL = Eliminated – did not advance into the medal race

== Swimming ==
Despite having an Olympic Selection Time (OST) performance, Bermuda's Roy-Allan Burch was selected based on Universality. Burch was able to win his heat by setting a new national record; however his fastest time was not enough for him to advance into the semifinals due to overall ranking.

Men

Athlete	Event	Heat		Semifinal		Final	
Athlete	Event	Time	Rank	Time	Rank	Time	Rank
Roy-Allan Burch	50 m freestyle	22.47	24	Did not advance			

== Triathlon ==
Bermuda selected a man and a woman in triathlon, based on the Olympic qualification list. Tyler Butterfield finished in thirty-fourth place, although he set the quickest time in the cycling portion. Flora Duffy, however, suffered a crash early into the cycling leg, finishing dismally in forty-fifth place.

Athlete	Event	Swim (1.5 km)	Trans 1	Bike (40 km)	Trans 2	Run (10 km)	Total Time	Rank
Tyler Butterfield	Men's	18:58	0:38	58:32	0:32	31:52	1:50:32	34
Flora Duffy	Women's	19:28	0:40	1:11:07	0:31	37:08	2:08:54	45

== See also ==
- Bermuda at the 2011 Pan American Games
