= Bermuda at the 1964 Summer Olympics =

- IOC code: BER
- NOC: Bermuda Olympic Association

in Tokyo
- Competitors: 4 in 1 sport
- Flag bearer: Whitfield Fredrick Hayward
- Medals: Gold 0 Silver 0 Bronze 0 Total 0

Summer Olympics appearances (overview)
- 1936; 1948; 1952; 1956; 1960; 1964; 1968; 1972; 1976; 1980; 1984; 1988; 1992; 1996; 2000; 2004; 2008; 2012; 2016; 2020; 2024

Bermuda competed at the 1964 Summer Olympics in Tokyo, Japan.

== Sailing ==
Open

| Athlete | Event | Race | | | | | | | Net points | Final rank |
| Athlete | Event | 1 | 2 | 3 | 4 | 5 | 6 | 7 | Net points | Final rank |
|---|---|---|---|---|---|---|---|---|---|---|
| Jay Hooper | Finn | ~~DNF~~ | 6 | 19 | 20 | 21 | 22 | 16 | 2489 | 20 |
| Edmund Kirkland "Kirk" Cooper; Eugene Simmons; Conrad Soares | Dragon | ~~19~~ | 8 | 5 | 6 | 1 | 2 | 11 | 5055 | 5 |
