= Bermuda at the 1984 Summer Olympics =

- IOC code: BER
- NOC: Bermuda Olympic Association

in Los Angeles
- Competitors: 12 (11 men, 1 woman) in 5 sports
- Flag bearer: Clarence Saunders
- Medals: Gold 0 Silver 0 Bronze 0 Total 0

Summer Olympics appearances (overview)
- 1936; 1948; 1952; 1956; 1960; 1964; 1968; 1972; 1976; 1980; 1984; 1988; 1992; 1996; 2000; 2004; 2008; 2012; 2016; 2020; 2024

Bermuda competed at the 1984 Summer Olympics in Los Angeles, United States. The nation returned to the Summer Games after participating in the American-led boycott of the 1980 Summer Olympics. Twelve competitors, eleven men and one woman, took part in ten events in five sports.

== Athletics ==
Men
Track & road events

Athlete	Event	Heat		Quarterfinal		Semifinal		Final	
Athlete	Event	Result	Rank	Result	Rank	Result	Rank	Result	Rank
Gregory Simons	200 m	21.88	6	did not advance					
Bill Trott	100 m	10.76	6	did not advance					

Field events

Athlete	Event	Qualification		Final	
Athlete	Event	Distance	Position	Distance	Position
Clarence Saunders	High jump	2.18	21	did not advance	

Women
Field events

Athlete	Event	Qualification		Final	
Athlete	Event	Distance	Position	Distance	Position
Sonia Smith	Javelin throw	52.74	20	did not advance	

== Cycling ==
Three cyclists represented Bermuda in 1984.

=== Road ===
Athlete	Event	Time	Rank
John Ford	Men's road race	DNF	
Earl Godfrey	Men's road race	DNF	
Clyde Wilson	Men's road race	DNF	

== Equestrian ==
=== Eventing ===
Athlete	Horse	Event	Eventing								Total	
Athlete	Horse	Event	Dressage		Cross-country			Jumping			Total	
Athlete	Horse	Event	Penalties	Rank	Penalties	Total	Rank	Penalties	Total	Rank	Total	Rank
Peter S. Gray	Somers	Individual	59.20	13	23.60	82.80	18	WD			DNF	

== Sailing ==
Alan Burland and Christopher Nash in Tornado Class, finished in 5th place, narrowly missing out on a medal

Men

Athlete	Event	Race							Net points	Final rank
Athlete	Event	1	2	3	4	5	6	7	Net points	Final rank
Hubert Watlington	Windglider	25	~~PMS~~	27	22	26	22	22	180.0	27

Open

Athlete	Event	Race							Net points	Final rank
Athlete	Event	1	2	3	4	5	6	7	Net points	Final rank
Alan Burland; Christopher Nash	Tornado	~~8~~	6	4	6	7	YMP	3	53.5	5

== Swimming ==
Men

Athlete	Event	Heat		Semifinal		Final	
Athlete	Event	Time	Rank	Time	Rank	Time	Rank
Victor Ruberry	100 m breaststroke	1:05.96	24	did not advance			
Victor Ruberry	200 m breaststroke	2:31.48	36	did not advance			
