= Bermuda at the 1968 Summer Olympics =

- IOC code: BER
- NOC: Bermuda Olympic Association

in Mexico City
- Competitors: 6 in 2 sports
- Flag bearer: Whitfield Fredrick Hayward
- Medals: Gold 0 Silver 0 Bronze 0 Total 0

Summer Olympics appearances (overview)
- 1936; 1948; 1952; 1956; 1960; 1964; 1968; 1972; 1976; 1980; 1984; 1988; 1992; 1996; 2000; 2004; 2008; 2012; 2016; 2020; 2024

Bermuda competed at the 1968 Summer Olympics in Mexico City, Mexico.

== Athletics ==
Men
Track & road events

| Athlete | Event | Heat | | Quarterfinal | | Semifinal | | Final | |
| Athlete | Event | Result | Rank | Result | Rank | Result | Rank | Result | Rank |
|---|---|---|---|---|---|---|---|---|---|
| Anthony Harper | 400 m | 49.18 | 7 | did not advance | | | | | |
| Jeff Payne | 1500 m | 4:18.9 | 11 | did not advance | | | | | |

== Sailing ==
Open

| Athlete | Event | Race | | | | | | | Net points | Final rank |
| Athlete | Event | 1 | 2 | 3 | 4 | 5 | 6 | 7 | Net points | Final rank |
|---|---|---|---|---|---|---|---|---|---|---|
| Jay Hooper | Finn | 20 | 13 | 22 | 23 | 17 | ~~DNF~~ | DNS | 167.0 | 24 |
| Edmund Kirkland "Kirk" Cooper; Eugene Simmons; Richard Belvin | Dragon | 9 | 14 | 10 | 7 | 10 | 14 | ~~18~~ | 100.0 | 13 |
