= Bermuda at the 2000 Summer Olympics =

- IOC code: BER
- NOC: Bermuda Olympic Association
- Website: www.olympics.bm

in Sydney
- Competitors: 6 (4 men and 2 women) in 4 sports
- Flag bearer: Mary Jane Tumbridge
- Medals: Gold 0 Silver 0 Bronze 0 Total 0

Summer Olympics appearances (overview)
- 1936; 1948; 1952; 1956; 1960; 1964; 1968; 1972; 1976; 1980; 1984; 1988; 1992; 1996; 2000; 2004; 2008; 2012; 2016; 2020; 2024

Bermuda competed at the 2000 Summer Olympics in Sydney, Australia.

== Competitors ==
The following is the list of number of competitors in the Games.

Sport	Men	Women	Total
Athletics	1	0	1
Equestrian	0	1	1
Sailing	2	1	3
Swimming	1	0	1
Total	4	2	6

== Athletics ==
Men
Field events

Athlete	Event	Qualification		Final	
Athlete	Event	Distance	Position	Distance	Position
Brian Wellman	Triple jump	16.47	20	did not advance	

== Equestrian ==
=== Eventing ===
Athlete	Horse	Event	Dressage		Cross-country			Jumping						Total	
Athlete	Horse	Event	Dressage		Cross-country			Qualifier			Final			Total	
Athlete	Horse	Event	Penalties	Rank	Penalties	Total	Rank	Penalties	Total	Rank	Penalties	Total	Rank	Penalties	Rank
Mary Jane Tumbridge	Bermuda's Gold	Individual	52.6	21	DNF			did not advance						DNF	

== Sailing ==
Women

Athlete	Event	Race											Net points	Final rank
Athlete	Event	1	2	3	4	5	6	7	8	9	10	11	Net points	Final rank
Sara Wright	Europe	~~26~~	25	22	21	21	24	23	23	25	~~27~~	20	204	25

Open

Athlete	Event	Race											Net points	Final rank
Athlete	Event	1	2	3	4	5	6	7	8	9	10	11	Net points	Final rank
Peter Bromby; Lee White	Star	4	~~10~~	3	8	4	1	~~12~~	7	6.3	8	4	45.3	4

== Swimming ==
Men

Athlete	Event	Heat		Semifinal		Final	
Athlete	Event	Time	Rank	Time	Rank	Time	Rank
Stephen Fahy	100 m butterfly	56.46	54	did not advance			
Stephen Fahy	200 m individual medley	2:07.92	41	did not advance			

== See also ==
- Bermuda at the 1999 Pan American Games
