= Bermuda at the 1996 Summer Olympics =

- IOC code: BER
- NOC: Bermuda Olympic Association
- Website: www.olympics.bm

in Atlanta
- Competitors: 9 (7 men and 2 women) in 4 sports
- Flag bearer: Brian Wellman
- Medals: Gold 0 Silver 0 Bronze 0 Total 0

Summer Olympics appearances (overview)
- 1936; 1948; 1952; 1956; 1960; 1964; 1968; 1972; 1976; 1980; 1984; 1988; 1992; 1996; 2000; 2004; 2008; 2012; 2016; 2020; 2024

Bermuda competed at the 1996 Summer Olympics in Atlanta, United States.

== Competitors ==
The following is the list of number of competitors in the Games.

Sport	Men	Women	Total
Athletics	3	0	3
Cycling	1	0	1
Equestrian	0	1	1
Sailing	3	1	4
Total	7	2	9

== Athletics ==
Men
Track & road events

Athlete	Event	Heat		Quarterfinal		Semifinal		Final	
Athlete	Event	Result	Rank	Result	Rank	Result	Rank	Result	Rank
DeVon Bean	200 m	10.89	7	did not advance					
Troy Douglas	200 m	20.41	3 Q	20.63	6	did not advance			
Troy Douglas	400 m	45.61	3 Q	45.26	4 Q	46.33	7	did not advance	

Field events

Athlete	Event	Qualification		Final	
Athlete	Event	Distance	Position	Distance	Position
Brian Wellman	Triple jump	17.10	5 Q	16.95	6

== Cycling ==
=== Road ===
Athlete	Event	Time	Rank
Elliot Hubbard	Men's road race	DNF	

== Equestrian ==
=== Dressage ===
Athlete	Horse	Event	Grand Prix						Total	
Athlete	Horse	Event	Test		Special		Freestyle		Total	
Athlete	Horse	Event	Total	Rank	Total	Rank	Total	Rank	Total	Rank
Suzanne Dunkley	Elliot	Individual	60.08	40	did not advance				60.08	40

== Sailing ==
Women

Athlete	Event	Race											Net points	Final rank
Athlete	Event	1	2	3	4	5	6	7	8	9	10	11	Net points	Final rank
Paula Lewin	Europe	~~20~~	9	6	15	15	14	14	8	5	~~17~~	8	94.0	14

Open

Athlete	Event	Race											Net points	Final rank
Athlete	Event	1	2	3	4	5	6	7	8	9	10	11	Net points	Final rank
Malcolm Smith	Laser	40	31	41	32	42	~~45~~	~~46~~	40	43	34	35	338.0	42
Peter Bromby; Lee White	Star	9	~~20~~	9	10	11	~~19~~	14	11	11	6	—N/a	81.0	13

== See also ==
- Bermuda at the 1995 Pan American Games
