= Bermuda at the 1972 Summer Olympics =

- IOC code: BER
- NOC: Bermuda Olympic Association

in Munich
- Competitors: 9 (men) in 3 sports
- Flag bearer: Edmund Kirkland "Kirk" Cooper (Sailing)
- Medals: Gold 0 Silver 0 Bronze 0 Total 0

Summer Olympics appearances (overview)
- 1936; 1948; 1952; 1956; 1960; 1964; 1968; 1972; 1976; 1980; 1984; 1988; 1992; 1996; 2000; 2004; 2008; 2012; 2016; 2020; 2024

Bermuda competed at the 1972 Summer Olympics in Munich, West Germany.

== Boxing ==
Men

Athlete	Event	1 Round	2 Round	Quarterfinals	Semifinals	Final	
Athlete	Event	Opposition Result	Opposition Result	Opposition Result	Opposition Result	Opposition Result	Rank
Roy Johnson	Light Welterweight	Anatoliy Kamnev (URS); L KO-2	did not advance				

== Rowing ==
Men

Athlete	Event	Heats		Repechage		Semifinal		Final	
Athlete	Event	Time	Rank	Time	Rank	Time	Rank	Time	Rank
James Butterfield	Single sculls	8:29.20	5 R	8:26.16	16	did not advance			

== Sailing ==
Open

Athlete	Event	Race							Net points	Final rank
Athlete	Event	1	2	3	4	5	6	7	Net points	Final rank
Paul Hiles	Finn	13	7	10	20	19	~~DNF~~	14	119.0	15
Edmund Kirkland "Kirk" Cooper; Alex Cooper; Jordy Walker	Soling	16	13	12	~~23~~	7	10	—	88.0	15
Eugene Simmons; James Amos; Richard Belvin	Dragon	14	15	16	4	~~18~~	6	—	82.7	13
