= Bermuda at the 1956 Summer Olympics =

- IOC code: BER
- NOC: Bermuda Olympic Association

in Melbourne/Stockholm
- Competitors: 3 in 1 sport
- Medals: Gold 0 Silver 0 Bronze 0 Total 0

Summer Olympics appearances (overview)
- 1936; 1948; 1952; 1956; 1960; 1964; 1968; 1972; 1976; 1980; 1984; 1988; 1992; 1996; 2000; 2004; 2008; 2012; 2016; 2020; 2024

Bermuda competed at the 1956 Summer Olympics in Melbourne, Australia.

== Sailing ==
Open

Athlete	Event	Race							Net points	Final rank
Athlete	Event	1	2	3	4	5	6	7	Net points	Final rank
Howard B. Eve; James W. Kempe; Bernard Ward	Dragon	11	15	~~16~~	10	14	13	16	1149	15
