= Bermuda at the 1952 Summer Olympics =

- IOC code: BER
- NOC: Bermuda Olympic Association

in Helsinki
- Competitors: 6 in 3 sports
- Flag bearer: Whitfield Fredrick Hayward
- Medals: Gold 0 Silver 0 Bronze 0 Total 0

Summer Olympics appearances (overview)
- 1936; 1948; 1952; 1956; 1960; 1964; 1968; 1972; 1976; 1980; 1984; 1988; 1992; 1996; 2000; 2004; 2008; 2012; 2016; 2020; 2024

Bermuda competed at the 1952 Summer Olympics in Helsinki, Finland.

== Athletics ==
Thelma Jones and Phyllis Jones both competed in the women's 100 metres and long jump.

Athlete	Event	Heat		Quarterfinal		Semifinal		Final		Ref
Athlete	Event	Result	Rank	Result	Rank	Result	Rank	Result	Rank	Ref
Thelma Jones	100 m	12.5	4	did not advance						
Phyllis Jones	100 m	13.3	5	did not advance						

Athlete	Event	Qualification		Final		Ref
Athlete	Event	Distance	Position	Distance	Position	Ref
Thelma Jones	Long jump	5.55	11	5.33	22	
Phyllis Jones	Long jump	4.92	33	did not advance		

== Diving ==
Frank Gosling and Mickey Johnson both competed in the men's 3 metre springboard.

Athlete	Event	Preliminaries		Final		Ref
Athlete	Event	Points	Rank	Points	Rank	Ref
Frank Gosling	3 m springboard	59.57	25	did not advance		
Mickey Johnson	3 m springboard	58.70	28	did not advance		

== Swimming ==
Walter Bardgett and Robert Cook both competed in the men's 100 metre freestyle, 400 metre freestyle and 1500 metre freestyle.

Athlete	Event	Heat		Semifinal		Final		Ref
Athlete	Event	Time	Rank	Time	Rank	Time	Rank	Ref
Walter Bardgett	100 m freestyle	1:04.4	7	did not advance				
Walter Bardgett	400 m freestyle	5:18.0	5	did not advance				
Walter Bardgett	1500 m freestyle	21:42.4	5	did not advance				
Robert Cook	100 m freestyle	1:04.1	6	did not advance				
Robert Cook	400 m freestyle	5:15.4	7	did not advance				
Robert Cook	1500 m freestyle	20:59.6	6	did not advance				
