= Bermuda at the 2008 Summer Olympics =

- IOC code: BER
- NOC: Bermuda Olympic Association
- Website: www.olympics.bm

in Beijing
- Competitors: 6 in 4 sports
- Flag bearer: Jillian Terceira
- Medals: Gold 0 Silver 0 Bronze 0 Total 0

Summer Olympics appearances (overview)
- 1936; 1948; 1952; 1956; 1960; 1964; 1968; 1972; 1976; 1980; 1984; 1988; 1992; 1996; 2000; 2004; 2008; 2012; 2016; 2020; 2024; 2028

Bermuda sent a delegation to compete at the 2008 Summer Olympics in Beijing, China. The games marked Bermuda's twenty-first Olympic appearance since its debut in 1936. The 2008 delegation included six athletes: Tyrone Smith and Arantxa King in long jump, Jillian Terceira in individual jumping on horseback, Kiera Aitken and Roy-Allan Burch in swimming (Aitken in backstroke, and Burch in freestyle), and Flora Duffy in triathlon. Bermuda did not win any medals in the Beijing games.

== Background ==
Bermuda's debut in the Olympic Games began with the 1936 Summer Olympics in Berlin, Nazi Germany, when the Bermudian delegation included five athletes, all men. Bermuda had appeared in twenty-one Olympic Games between 1936 and the 2008 Beijing Olympics, excluding the 1980 Summer Olympics. Of those twenty-one games, sixteen of them were Summer Olympics. Bermuda had, prior to Beijing, earned one medal, when Clarence Hill won bronze in the 1976 Summer Olympics. The 2008 Bermudian delegation had fewer people than it usually sent abroad, prompting the president of the Bermudian Olympic Association Austin Woods to complain publicly that the year's Olympic team lacked access to quality coaches, administrators, and facilities, and with the exception of several athletes, lacked the skill to be competitive.

Bermuda dispatched six athletes in total to the Beijing Olympics. Of the delegation, two of the athletes (Roy-Allen Burch and Tyrone Smith) were men and four of the athletes (Flora Duffy, Kiera Aitken, Arantxa King, and Jill Terceira) were women. King was the youngest Bermudian participant during the 2008 Olympics, at 18 years of age, and Terceira was the oldest, at 37. No Bermudian athlete advanced to a final round during the 2008 Games.

== Athletics ==
Two people competed in track and field representing Bermuda: Tyrone Smith and Arantxa King. Smith participated in men's long jump, while Arantxa King participated in women's long jump. Neither advanced past the qualifying rounds in Beijing.

Former Missouri S&T student Tyrone "Sticks" Smith earned a spot on Bermuda's team when he finished in third place at the long jump event that took place during the 2008 Central American and Caribbean Championships in Cali, Colombia. Smith's appearance at the Beijing Olympics was his first at any of the Olympic games. During the course of the event at the Olympics, Smith was placed in Heat 2 of the August 16 qualifying rounds, set to compete against athletes that included Irving Jahir Saladino Aranda of Panama (who won the gold medal in finals) and Ngonidzashe Makusha of Zimbabwe (who was fourth-place runner-up in finals). Out of twenty competitors, Smith ranked seventh with a distance of 7.91 meters. He was 0.1 meters ahead of Fabrice Lapierre of Australia, who placed eighth in the qualifying round, and 0.13 meters behind heat leader Makusha. Tyrone Smith was three centimeters short of a distance that would have qualified him for finals, and did not progress.

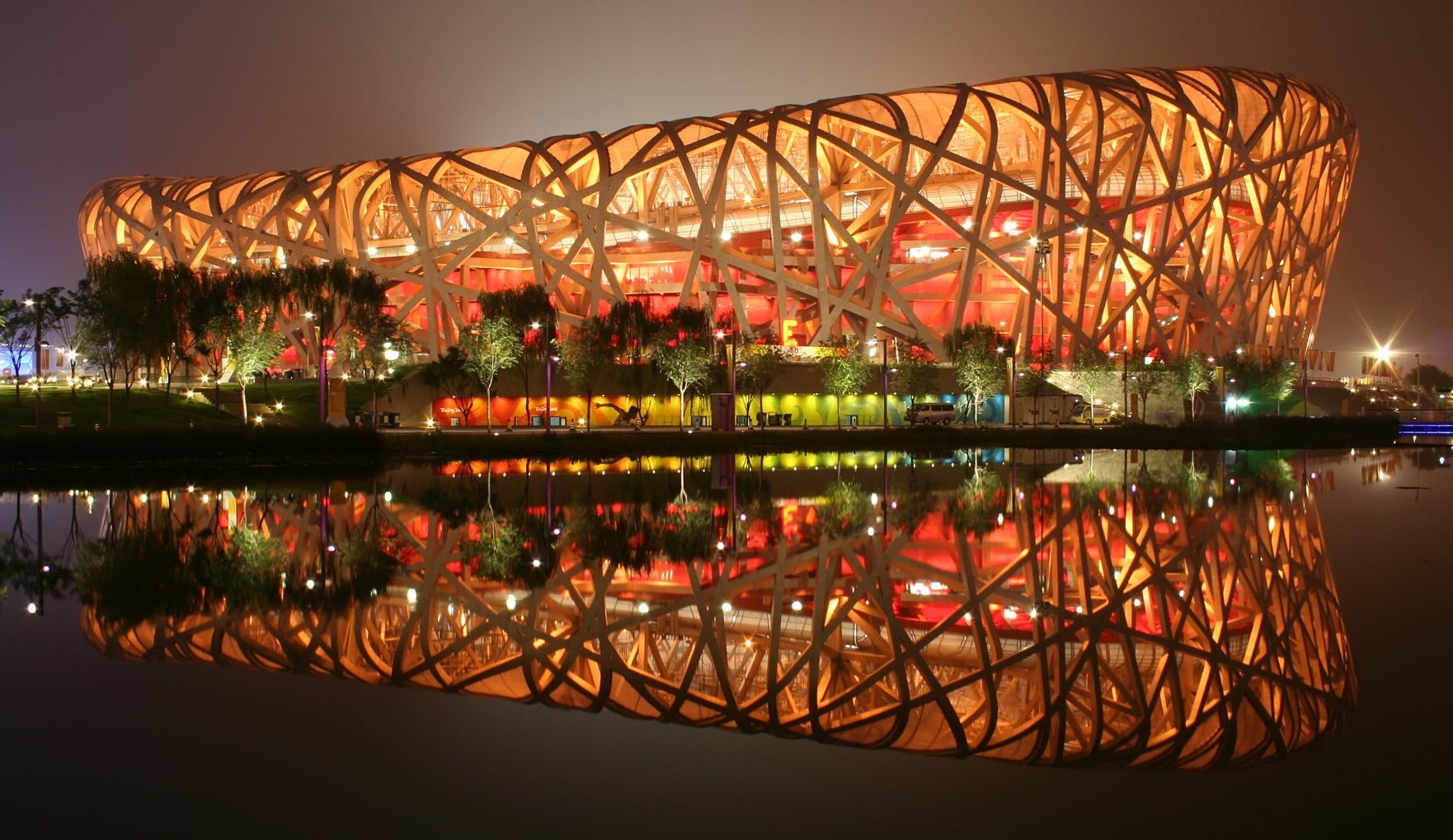
The Beijing National Stadium, where track and field (athletics) events took place.

Stanford first-year student Arantxa King was chosen by the Bermuda Olympic Association on Wednesday, July 23, 2008 through the use of its IAAF female at-large selection. Her participation in the 2008 Beijing Olympics marked her Olympic debut. During the August 18 Qualifying rounds, King was placed in Heat 2 versus competitors that included Russia's Tatyana Lebedeva and Nigeria's Blessing Okagbare, both of whom received medals in the event finals. King jumped a distance of 6.01 meters, 0.69 meters behind leading qualifier Lebedeva's score, placing nineteenth (out of twenty-one) in the event. She placed last in the heat, ahead of two disqualified athletes, and thirty-sixth (out of forty-two) athletes when considering all heats at once. Arantxa King did not progress to the next and final round on August 22.

Athlete	Event	Qualification		Final	
Athlete	Event	Distance	Rank	Distance	Rank
Tyrone Smith	Men's long jump	7.91	15	did not advance	
Arantxa King	Women's long jump	6.01	36	did not advance	

Key

- Note–Ranks given for track events are within the athlete's heat only
- Q = Qualified for the next round
- q = Qualified for the next round as a fastest loser or, in field events, by position without achieving the qualifying target
- NR = National record
- N/A = Round not applicable for the event
- Bye = Athlete not required to compete in round

== Equestrian ==
Jillian Terceira was not originally chosen to participate on Bermuda's Olympic team, and was passed up for Patrick Nisbett and his horse, Antille 8. This occurred when neither Terceira nor Nisbett qualified for an Olympic spot at the equestrian finals in Hong Kong, caused in part by the injury of Terceira's horse, Navantus. Because Bermuda was allowed only one horse rider, the Bermuda Equestrian Federation awarded their one reserved Olympic spot to Nisbett because Terceira's horse had been injured during the course of the event.

Terceira argued that she had a second horse, Chaka III, who should have been used in the injured Navantus' place, was regularly faster than Nisbett's Antille 8 and should have earned the qualification position. She also accused the Bermuda Equestrian Federation of making the decision based on political or racial motivations, which the organization denied. BEF president Mike Cherry explained that Chaka III did not qualify for the event until June 30, the final day, which is the reason why the horse was not considered for Bermuda's Olympic slot. The BEF organized a final day of competition between Nisbett's Antille and Terceira's Chaka to give Terceira one last opportunity to qualify for an Olympic position. Nisbett, however, withdrew from the Olympic position later that June. Terceira took his place.

Terceira competed in the August 15 preliminaries of individual equestrian jumping. As rankings are derived from the number of penalties that one accumulates, Terceira tied for 39th place with seven other horse riders, having accrued five penalties. Terceira also participated in the August 17th preliminary round, but was eliminated, and did not advance to the finals.

=== Show jumping ===
Athlete	Horse	Event	Qualification								Final					Total	
Athlete	Horse	Event	Round 1		Round 2			Round 3			Round A		Round B			Total	
Athlete	Horse	Event	Penalties	Rank	Penalties	Total	Rank	Penalties	Total	Rank	Penalties	Rank	Penalties	Total	Rank	Penalties	Rank
Jillian Terceira	Chaka III	Individual	5	39	Eliminated			did not advance									

== Swimming ==
Two swimmers represented Bermuda at the Beijing Olympics: Kiera Aitken and Roy-Allan Burch. Aitken participated in the women's 100 meter backstroke, and Burch swam the men's 100 meter backstroke. Neither advanced past the preliminary round.

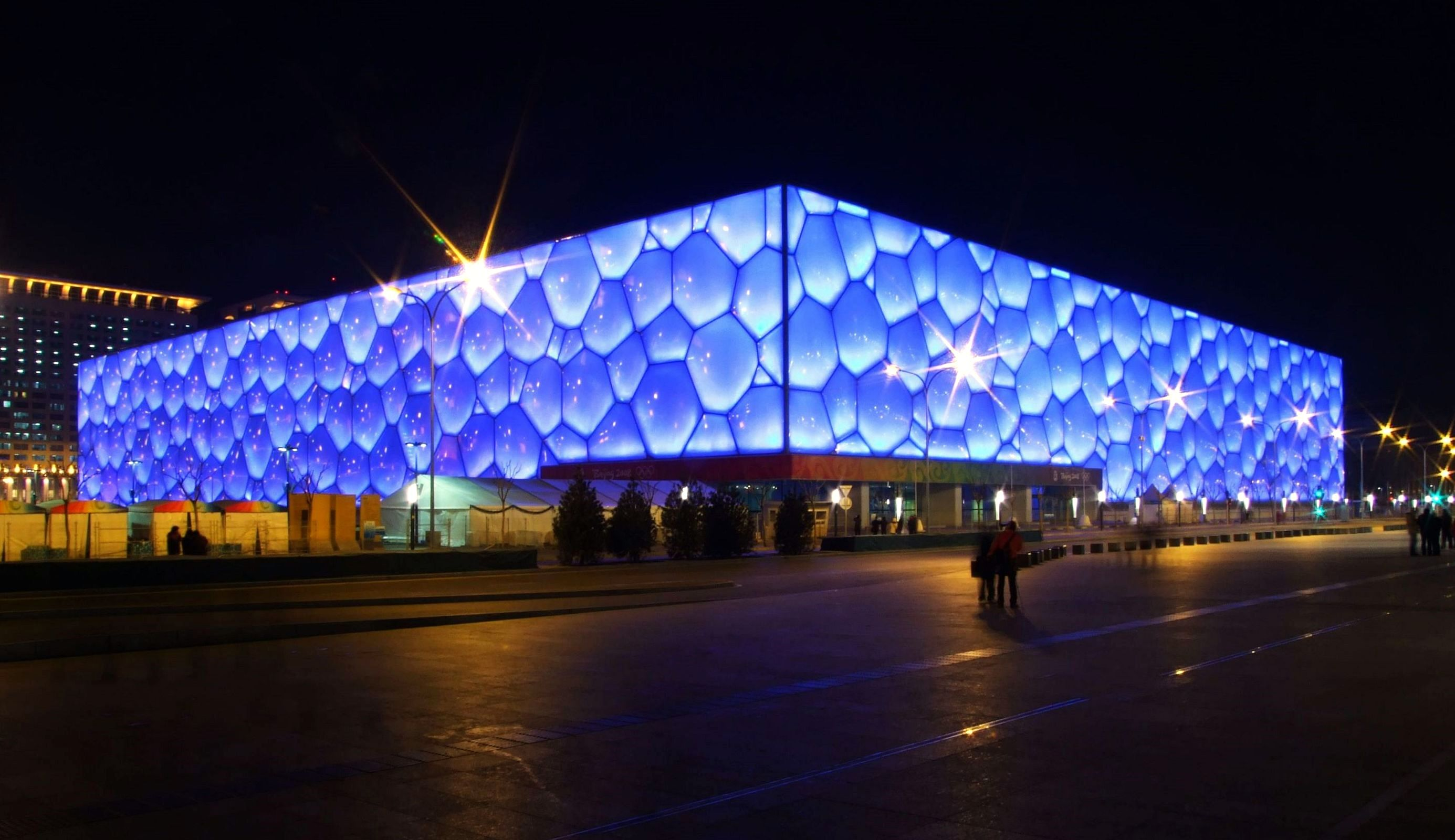
The Beijing National Aquatics Center, where the swimming events were held.

Former Dalhousie University student and national record holder Kiera Aitken participated on behalf of Bermuda for her second Olympic appearance after the 2004 Summer Olympics in Athens. Aitken participated in the August 10 preliminaries for the 100 meters women's backstroke, where she was placed in Heat 1 with Paraguay's Maria Virginia Baez and Panama's Christie Marie Bodden Baca. With a time of 1:02.62, Aitken ranked first in her heat, defeating Baez by almost three seconds. However, her overall ranking placed her thirty-third out of forty-nine swimmers between Alana Dillette of the Bahamas (32nd) and Hiu Wai Sherry Tsai of Hong Kong (34th). Aitken was 3.62 seconds slower than Kirsty Coventry of Zimbabwe, who set an Olympic record during the preliminary round with a time of 59.00 seconds. Aitken did not make the time necessary to progress to the next round.

Former Springfield College student and national record-setter Roy-Allan Burch, the only male swimmer who participated on behalf of Bermuda's Olympic team, swam in the 100 meter freestyle event after undergoing an irregular training schedule with coach John Taffe necessitated by the recent death of his mother by cancer. During August 12, Burch competed in the preliminaries for his event, and was placed in Heat 2. He swam the event in 52.65 seconds, placing fifth out of six athletes in the heat, immediately after Obaid Ahmed Aljesmi of the United Arab Emirates. The heat leader, Jan Roodzant of the Dutch colony Aruba, completed the event in 51.69 seconds. Overall, Roy-Allan Burch ranked sixty out of sixty-four athletes. Eamon Sullivan of Australia, the leader of the preliminary times, was approximately four seconds ahead of Burch. Roy-Allan Burch did not proceed to the semifinal rounds.

Athlete	Event	Heat		Semifinal		Final	
Athlete	Event	Time	Rank	Time	Rank	Time	Rank
Kiera Aitken	Women's 100 m backstroke	1:02.62	33	did not advance			
Roy-Allan Burch	Men's 100 m freestyle	52:65	60	did not advance			

== Triathlon ==
Flora Duffy was invited to participate in the Beijing Olympics based on her performance in the qualification competitions. Participating on the August 18 event, Duffy competed in the women's triathlon. Duffy swam the 1.5 kilometers portion of the distance in 20:26 minutes, ranking 41st out of 55 in that portion of the event, behind Luxembourg's Liz May (40th) by under a second and ahead of Hungary's Zita Szabó by two seconds. In this portion of the event, Duffy was 37 seconds behind the United States' Laura Bennett, who finished the swimming portion of the event first at 19:49. Duffy took 33 seconds to make the transition from swim to cycling, the second part of the event, tying with Mak So Ning of Hong Kong at 52nd place out of 55. Duffy, however, was lapped on the bike leg and was disqualified before reaching the running portion or completing the event.

Athlete	Event	Swim (1.5 km)	Trans 1	Bike (40 km)	Trans 2	Run (10 km)	Total Time	Rank
Flora Duffy	Women's	20:26	0:33	Lapped				

== See also ==
- Bermuda at the 2007 Pan American Games
- Bermuda at the 2010 Central American and Caribbean Games
