= Bermuda at the 2016 Summer Olympics =

- IOC code: BER
- NOC: Bermuda Olympic Association
- Website: www.olympics.bm

in Rio de Janeiro
- Competitors: 8 in 5 sports
- Flag bearer: Tyrone Smith
- Medals: Gold 0 Silver 0 Bronze 0 Total 0

Summer Olympics appearances (overview)
- 1936; 1948; 1952; 1956; 1960; 1964; 1968; 1972; 1976; 1980; 1984; 1988; 1992; 1996; 2000; 2004; 2008; 2012; 2016; 2020; 2024; 2028

Bermuda competed at the 2016 Summer Olympics in Rio de Janeiro, Brazil, from 5 to 21 August 2016. Since the nation's official debut in 1936, Bermudian athletes have appeared in every edition of the Summer Olympic Games, but did not attend the 1980 Summer Olympics in Moscow because of the nation's partial support for the US-led boycott.

The Bermuda Olympic Association sent a total of eight athletes, four per gender, to compete in five different sports at the Games, matching its roster size with London 2012. Two of them returned for their third Olympic appearance in Rio de Janeiro: triathlete Flora Duffy and long jumper Tyrone Smith, who finished twelfth in the final at the previous Games. The most successful and experienced member of the team, Smith was appointed by the committee to carry the Bermudian flag in the opening ceremony. Among the sports represented by the athletes, Bermuda marked its Olympic return in rowing for the first time since 1972. However, Bermuda failed to send an athlete in equestrian for the first time since 1976.

Bermuda, however, failed to collect its first Olympic medal, since the 1976 Summer Olympics in Montreal, where Clarence Hill won the bronze in men's heavyweight boxing. Unable to end her nation's 40-year drought on the podium, Duffy produced the best result for the Bermudans at the Games, finishing eighth in the women's triathlon.

== Athletics (track and field) ==
Bermudan athletes have so far achieved qualifying standards in the following athletics events (up to a maximum of 3 athletes in each event):

Key

- Note–Ranks given for track events are within the athlete's heat only
- Q = Qualified for the next round
- q = Qualified for the next round as a fastest loser or, in field events, by position without achieving the qualifying target
- NR = National record
- N/A = Round not applicable for the event
- Bye = Athlete not required to compete in round

Track & road events

Athlete	Event	Heat		Semifinal		Final	
Athlete	Event	Result	Rank	Result	Rank	Result	Rank
Harold Houston	Men's 200 m	20.85	6	Did not advance			

Field events

Athlete	Event	Qualification		Final	
Athlete	Event	Distance	Position	Distance	Position
Tyrone Smith	Men's long jump	7.81	16	Did not advance	

== Rowing ==
Bermuda has qualified one boat in the women's single sculls for the Games at the 2016 Latin American Continental Qualification Regatta in Valparaíso, Chile, signifying the nation's Olympic return to the sport for the first time since 1972.

Athlete	Event	Heats		Repechage		Quarterfinals		Semifinals		Final	
Athlete	Event	Time	Rank	Time	Rank	Time	Rank	Time	Rank	Time	Rank
Michelle Pearson	Women's single sculls	8:22.15	3 QF	Bye		7:34.00	4 SC/D	8:05.78	2 FC	7:34.41	16

Qualification Legend: FA=Final A (medal); FB=Final B (non-medal); FC=Final C (non-medal); FD=Final D (non-medal); FE=Final E (non-medal); FF=Final F (non-medal); SA/B=Semifinals A/B; SC/D=Semifinals C/D; SE/F=Semifinals E/F; QF=Quarterfinals; R=Repechage

== Sailing ==
Bermuda has qualified a boat in the Laser Radial class by virtue of a top finish for North America at the 2016 ISAF World Cup regatta in Miami, Florida, United States. Another boat was also awarded to the Bermudian sailor competing in the Laser boat through a Tripartite Commission invitation.

Athlete	Event	Race											Net points	Final rank
Athlete	Event	1	2	3	4	5	6	7	8	9	10	M*	Net points	Final rank
Cameron Pimentel	Men's Laser	31	~~45~~	41	27	44	42	39	34	42	39	EL	339	41
Cecilia Wollmann	Women's Laser Radial	32	28	33	~~35~~	35	33	34	33	32	32	EL	291	34

M = Medal race; EL = Eliminated – did not advance into the medal race

== Swimming ==
Bermuda has received a Universality invitation from FINA to send two swimmers (one male and one female) to the Olympics.

Athlete	Event	Heat		Semifinal		Final	
Athlete	Event	Time	Rank	Time	Rank	Time	Rank
Julian Fletcher	Men's 100 m breaststroke	1:02.73	40	Did not advance			
Rebecca Heyliger	Women's 50 m freestyle	26.54	52	Did not advance			

== Triathlon ==
Bermuda has entered one triathlete to compete at the Games. Remarkably going to her third Olympics, world no. 6 seed Flora Duffy was ranked among the top 40 eligible triathletes in the women's event based on the ITU Olympic Qualification List as of 15 May 2016.

Athlete	Event	Swim (1.5 km)	Trans 1	Bike (40 km)	Trans 2	Run (10 km)	Total Time	Rank
Flora Duffy	Women's	19:08	0:52	1:01:29	0:41	36:15	1:58:25	8

== See also ==
- Bermuda at the 2015 Pan American Games
