= Bermuda at the 1936 Summer Olympics =

- IOC code: BER
- NOC: Bermuda Olympic Association

in Berlin
- Competitors: 5 in 1 sport
- Flag bearer: Whitfield Fredrick Hayward
- Medals: Gold 0 Silver 0 Bronze 0 Total 0

Summer Olympics appearances (overview)
- 1936; 1948; 1952; 1956; 1960; 1964; 1968; 1972; 1976; 1980; 1984; 1988; 1992; 1996; 2000; 2004; 2008; 2012; 2016; 2020; 2024

Bermuda competed in the Summer Olympic Games for the first time at the 1936 Summer Olympics in Berlin, Germany. After gaining IOC recognition in February 1936, Bermuda were invited to take part in the 1936 Summer Olympics. With the financial backing of Sir Howard Trott, a team of swimmers would be sent. Whitfield Fredrick "Chummy" Hayward a successful businessman and an accomplished athlete, arranged for American coach William Brooks to come to Bermuda to train the swimmers and also persuaded Leonard Spence an ex-world breaststroke record holder to move from British Guiana to Bermuda in order to compete for them. He traveled to Berlin as the team manager, and carried the flag at the opening ceremony.

== Swimming ==
Men

Ranks given are within the heat.

Athlete	Event	Heat		Semifinal		Final	
Athlete	Event	Time	Rank	Time	Rank	Time	Rank
Leonard Spence	100 m freestyle	1:01.9	4	Did not advance			
John Young	100 m freestyle	1:07.8	6	Did not advance			
Edmund Cooper	400 m freestyle	5:53.8	5	Did not advance			
Percy Belvin	200 m breaststroke	3:09.8	5	Did not advance			
Leonard Spence	200 m breaststroke	2:52.0	1 Q	DSQ		Did not advance	
Edmund Cooper; Leonard Spence; Dudley Spurling; John Young	4 × 200 m freestyle relay	—		10:50.5	5	Did not advance	
