= Christopher Nash =

Christopher Nash may refer to:

- Chris Nash (born 1983), English cricketer
- Christopher Nash (sailor) (born 1952), Bermudian sailor
- Christopher Columbus Nash (1838–?), American merchant and a Democratic sheriff in Grant Parish, Louisiana
