= Patrick Singleton =

Bermudian luger (born 1974)

Patrick Singleton OLY (born October 15, 1974) is a Bermudian luger who competed in the late 1990s and early 2000s before going into skeleton in 2002. In 1998, Singleton finished 27th in the men's singles event while he finished 37th in the same event four years later.

He finished 19th in the men's skeleton event at the 2006 Winter Olympics in Turin. He suffered an injury shortly before the 2010 Winter Olympics in Vancouver and did not compete.

Singleton's best finish at the FIBT World Championships was 24th at Calgary in 2005.

Olympic Games
Preceded by Mary Jane Tumbridge	Flagbearer for Bermuda; Salt Lake 2002	Succeeded by Peter Bromby
Preceded by Peter Bromby	Flagbearer for Bermuda; Torino 2006	Succeeded by Jill Terciera
