= Jay Hooper =

Jay Hooper may refer to:

- Jay Hooper (sailor)
- Jay Hooper (politician)
