= Burland (surname) =

Burland is a surname. Notable people with the surname include:

- Alan Burland (born 1952), Bermudian sailor
- Brian Burland (1931–2010), Bermudian writer
- Cottie Arthur Burland (1905–1983), British author and researcher
- Dave Burland (born 1941), British folk singer and guitarist
- John Burland (judge) (1724–1776), British lawyer and judge
