= Bermuda at the 2004 Summer Olympics =

- IOC code: BER
- NOC: Bermuda Olympic Association
- Website: www.olympics.bm

in Athens
- Competitors: 10 in 6 sports
- Flag bearer: Peter Bromby
- Medals: Gold 0 Silver 0 Bronze 0 Total 0

Summer Olympics appearances (overview)
- 1936; 1948; 1952; 1956; 1960; 1964; 1968; 1972; 1976; 1980; 1984; 1988; 1992; 1996; 2000; 2004; 2008; 2012; 2016; 2020; 2024

Bermuda competed at the 2004 Summer Olympics in Athens, Greece from 13 to 29 August 2004. This was the nation's fifteenth appearance at the Olympics, except the 1980 Summer Olympics in Moscow.

The Bermuda Olympic Association sent a total of 10 athletes to the Games, an equal share of five men and women, to compete in athletics, diving, equestrian, sailing, swimming, and triathlon. After achieving a fourth-place finish from Sydney, four-time Olympic sailor Peter Bromby was appointed as the nation's flag bearer in the opening ceremony.

== Athletics ==
Bermudan athletes have so far achieved qualifying standards in the following athletics events (up to a maximum of 3 athletes in each event at the 'A' Standard, and 1 at the 'B' Standard).

Men

Athlete	Event	Heat		Quarterfinal		Semifinal		Final	
Athlete	Event	Result	Rank	Result	Rank	Result	Rank	Result	Rank
Xavier James	100 m	10.40	6	Did not advance					

Key

- Note–Ranks given for track events are within the athlete's heat only
- Q = Qualified for the next round
- q = Qualified for the next round as a fastest loser or, in field events, by position without achieving the qualifying target
- NR = National record
- N/A = Round not applicable for the event
- Bye = Athlete not required to compete in round

== Diving ==
Women

Athlete	Events	Preliminaries		Semifinals		Final	
Athlete	Events	Points	Rank	Points	Rank	Points	Rank
Katura Horton-Perinchief	3 m springboard	203.58	30	Did not advance			

== Equestrian ==
=== Eventing ===
Athlete	Horse	Event	Dressage		Cross-country			Jumping						Total	
Athlete	Horse	Event	Dressage		Cross-country			Qualifier			Final			Total	
Athlete	Horse	Event	Penalties	Rank	Penalties	Total	Rank	Penalties	Total	Rank	Penalties	Total	Rank	Penalties	Rank
Tim Collins	Delton Magna	Individual	59.40	43	9.20	68.60	38	13.00	81.60	36	Did not advance			81.60	36

== Sailing ==
Men

Athlete	Event	Race											Net points	Final rank
Athlete	Event	1	2	3	4	5	6	7	8	9	10	M*	Net points	Final rank
Peter Bromby; Lee White	Star	~~17~~	16	8	11	12	10	6	4	1	3	11	82	8

Women

Athlete	Event	Race											Net points	Final rank
Athlete	Event	1	2	3	4	5	6	7	8	9	10	M*	Net points	Final rank
Paula Lewin; Peta Lewin; Christine Patton	Yngling	4	15	6	13	~~16~~	14	9	16	16	11	4	108	15

M = Medal race; OCS = On course side of the starting line; DSQ = Disqualified; DNF = Did not finish; DNS= Did not start; RDG = Redress given

== Swimming ==
Women

Athlete	Event	Heat		Semifinal		Final	
Athlete	Event	Time	Rank	Time	Rank	Time	Rank
Kiera Aitken	100 m backstroke	1:04.37	31	Did not advance			

== Triathlon ==
Athlete	Event	Swim (1.5 km)	Trans 1	Bike (40 km)	Trans 2	Run (10 km)	Total Time	Rank
Tyler Butterfield	Men's	19:34	0:18	1:04.20	0:24	34:32	1:58:26.99	35

== See also ==
- Bermuda at the 2003 Pan American Games
