= Bermuda at the 2024 Summer Olympics =

- IOC code: BER
- NOC: Bermuda Olympic Association
- Website: olympics.bm

in Paris, France 26 July 2024 – 11 August 2024
- Competitors: 8 (4 men and 4 women) in 5 sports
- Flag bearers (opening): Jah-Nhai Perinchief & Adriana Penruddocke
- Flag bearer (closing): Dara Alizadeh
- Medals: Gold 0 Silver 0 Bronze 0 Total 0

Summer Olympics appearances (overview)
- 1936; 1948; 1952; 1956; 1960; 1964; 1968; 1972; 1976; 1980; 1984; 1988; 1992; 1996; 2000; 2004; 2008; 2012; 2016; 2020; 2024

Bermuda competed at the 2024 Summer Olympics in Paris from 26 July to 11 August 2024. Since the nation's official debut in 1936, Bermudian athletes have appeared in every edition of the Summer Olympic Games, but did not attend the 1980 Summer Olympics in Moscow because of the nation's support for the US-led boycott.

== Competitors ==
The following is the list of number of competitors in the Games.

Sport	Men	Women	Total
Athletics	1	0	1
Rowing	1	0	1
Sailing	0	1	1
Swimming	1	1	2
Triathlon	1	2	3
Total	4	4	8

== Athletics ==
For the first time since 2016, Bermudian track and field athletes achieved the entry standards for Paris 2024 by world ranking, in the following events (a maximum of 3 athletes each):

Key

- Note–Ranks given for track events are within the athlete's heat only
- Q = Qualified for the next round
- q = Qualified for the next round as the fastest loser or, in field events, by position without achieving the qualifying target
- NR = National record
- N/A = Round not applicable for the event
- Bye = Athlete not required to compete in round

Field events

Athlete	Event	Qualification		Final	
Athlete	Event	Result	Rank	Result	Rank
Jah-Nhai Perinchief	Men's triple jump	16.23	28	Did not advance	

== Rowing ==
For the first time since 2016 Olympics in Rio, Bermudan rowers qualified one boats in the men's single sculls for the Games, through the 2024 Americas Qualification Regatta in Rio de Janeiro, Brazil.

Athlete	Event	Heats		Repechage		Quarterfinals		Semifinals		Final	
Athlete	Event	Time	Rank	Time	Rank	Time	Rank	Time	Rank	Time	Rank
Dara Alizadeh	Men's single sculls	7:23.70	5 R	7:17.05	3 SE/F	Bye		7:33.38	1 FE	7:03.12	28

Qualification Legend: FA=Final A (medal); FB=Final B (non-medal); FC=Final C (non-medal); FD=Final D (non-medal); FE=Final E (non-medal); FF=Final F (non-medal); SA/B=Semifinals A/B; SC/D=Semifinals C/D; SE/F=Semifinals E/F; QF=Quarterfinals; R=Repechage

== Sailing ==
For the first time since 2016, Bermuda sailors secured a quota place in the women's laser radial event through winning the event at the 2023 Pan American Games in Santiago, Chile.

Medal race events

Athlete	Event	Race											Net points	Final rank
Athlete	Event	1	2	3	4	5	6	7	8	9	10	M*	Net points	Final rank
Adriana Penruddocke	Women's ILCA 6	14	35	26	35	15	23	~~44~~	36	42	C	EL	226	36

M = Medal race; EL = Eliminated – did not advance into the medal race; C = cancelled

== Swimming ==
For the first time since 2016, Bermuda sent two swimmers to compete at the 2024 Paris Olympics.

Athlete	Event	Heat		Semifinal		Final	
Athlete	Event	Time	Rank	Time	Rank	Time	Rank
Jack Harvey	Men's 100 m backstroke	55.78	39	Did not advance			
Emma Harvey	Women's 100 m backstroke	1:01.47	23	Did not advance			

== Triathlon ==
Bermuda entered three triathletes (one men and two women's) in the triathlon events for Paris. Two Bermudian female triathletes, qualified for the games following the release of final individual Olympics qualification ranking; meanwhile Tyler Smith qualified for the games by receiving the tripartite commission quota. Flora Duffy seeks to repeat as gold medal winner after her win in the 2020 Summer Olympics.

Individual

Athlete	Event	Time						Rank
Athlete	Event	Swim (1.5 km)	Trans 1	Bike (40 km)	Trans 2	Run (10 km)	Total	Rank
Tyler Smith	Men's	21:39	0:55	54:16	0:27	34:42	1:51:59	48
Flora Duffy	Women's	22:05	0:56	58:44	0:28	33:59	1:56.12	5
Erica Hawley	Women's	24:05	0:58	1:00:37	0:31	36:44	2:02:55	41

== See also ==
- Bermuda at the 2023 Pan American Games
