= Eric Cook =

Eric Cook may refer to:

- Eric Cook (politician) (1909–1986), Canadian politician
- Eric Cook (sailor) (born 1942), South African sailor
- Eric Cook (fl. 1990s–2000s), musician with Gravitar

== See also ==
- Eric Longley-Cook (1898–1983), Royal Navy officer
- Eric Edgar Cooke (1931–1964), Australian serial killer
