= Belvin =

Belvin is a surname. Notable people with the surname include:

- Harry J. W. Belvin (1900–1986), American educator and politician
- Jesse Belvin (1932–1960), American rock and roll singer, pianist, and songwriter
- Richard Belvin (born 1941), Bermudian competitive sailor
