= Carlos Santacreu =

Spanish sailor

Personal information
- Nationality: Spanish
- Born: 15 September 1966 (age 60)

Sport
- Sport: Sailing

Carlos Santacreu (born 15 September 1966) is a Spanish sailor. He competed in the Tornado event at the 1992 Summer Olympics.
