= Nick Holmes-Smith =

Canadian equestrian (born 1958)

Personal information
- Full name: Nicholas Stuart Holmes-Smith
- Nationality: Canadian
- Born: 14 October 1958 (age 67); Penticton, British Columbia, Canada
- Height: 175 cm (5 ft 9 in)
- Weight: 70 kg (154 lb)
Medal record
Equestrian
Representing Canada
Pan American Games
| Gold medal – first place | 1991 Chatsworth | Individual eventing |
| Gold medal – first place | 1991 Chatsworth | Team eventing |

Nicholas Stuart Holmes-Smith (born 14 October 1958) is a Canadian equestrian. He competed at the 1988 Summer Olympics and the 1992 Summer Olympics.
