= Peter S. Gray =

Bermudian equestrian

Peter Gray

Personal information
- Full name: Peter S. Gray
- Nationality: Bermudian / Canadian
- Born: 24 November 1957 (age 67); Paget, Bermuda
Medal record
Equestrian
Representing Bermuda
Pan American Games
Silver medal – second place	1991 Chatsworth	Team eventing
Bronze medal – third place	1987 Indianapolis	Individual eventing

Peter S. Gray (born 24 November 1957 in Paget, Bermuda) is an equestrian who has competed in two Olympic games, been chosen as a reserve in one games and acted as team coach in two more.

== Career ==
In 1980, Gray became the first Bermudian rider to compete internationally when he participated in the alternate 1980 Olympic Games. Gray competed in three-day eventing for Bermuda in the 1984 and 1988 Summer Games. He did not finish in the 1984 Games and came in 31st in the 1988 Games. In 1995 he became a Canadian citizen. At the 1996 and 2000 Summer Games he was the team coach for the Canadian equestrian squad, and in 2004 he was selected as an alternate for the three-day eventing team. He has also begun competing in dressage, although not at the Olympic level. Gray is the co-founder of Equiventures, LLC, a horse show management company.

== See also ==
- Bermuda at the 1984 Summer Olympics
- Bermuda at the 1988 Summer Olympics
- Bermuda at the 1991 Pan American Games
