= Equestrian events at the 1991 Pan American Games =

The 11th Pan American Games were held in Havana, Cuba, from August 2 to August 18, 1991.

== Events ==
Event	Gold	Silver	Bronze
Individual dressage	Lorraine Stubbs; Canada	Ashley Munro; Canada	Jennifer Miller; United States
Team dressage	Canada: Lorraine Stubbs; Ashley Munro; Gina Smith; Leslie Reid	United States: Kathy Adams; Gwen Blake; Jennifer Miller; Tom Valter	Mexico: Christer Egerstrom; Margarita Nava
Individual jumping	Danny Foster; Canada	Elizabeth Underhill; Canada	Vitor Alves Teixeira; Brazil
Team jumping	Brazil: André Johannpeter; Luiz Felipe de Azevedo; Marcelo Artiaga; Vitor Alves Teixeira	Canada: Danny Foster; Elizabeth Underhill; Ian Millar; Sandra Anderson	United States: D.D. Alexander; Andre Dignelli; Rich Fellers; Debbie Shaffner

=== Events in Chatsworth, United States ===
Event	Gold	Silver	Bronze
Individual eventing	Nick Holmes-Smith; Canada	Mary Jane Tumbridge; Bermuda	Abgail Lufkin; United States
Team eventing	Canada: Nick Holmes-Smith; Stuart Young-Black; James Smart; Edie Tarves	Bermuda: MJ Tumbridge; Carol Ann Blackman; Peter Gray; Garry Roque	Mexico: Jaime Velásquez; Rafael Garzón; Vicente Peralta; Rogelio Hernández

== See also ==
- Equestrian events at the 1992 Summer Olympics
