= Tucker Murphy =

Bermudian cross-country skier (born 1981)

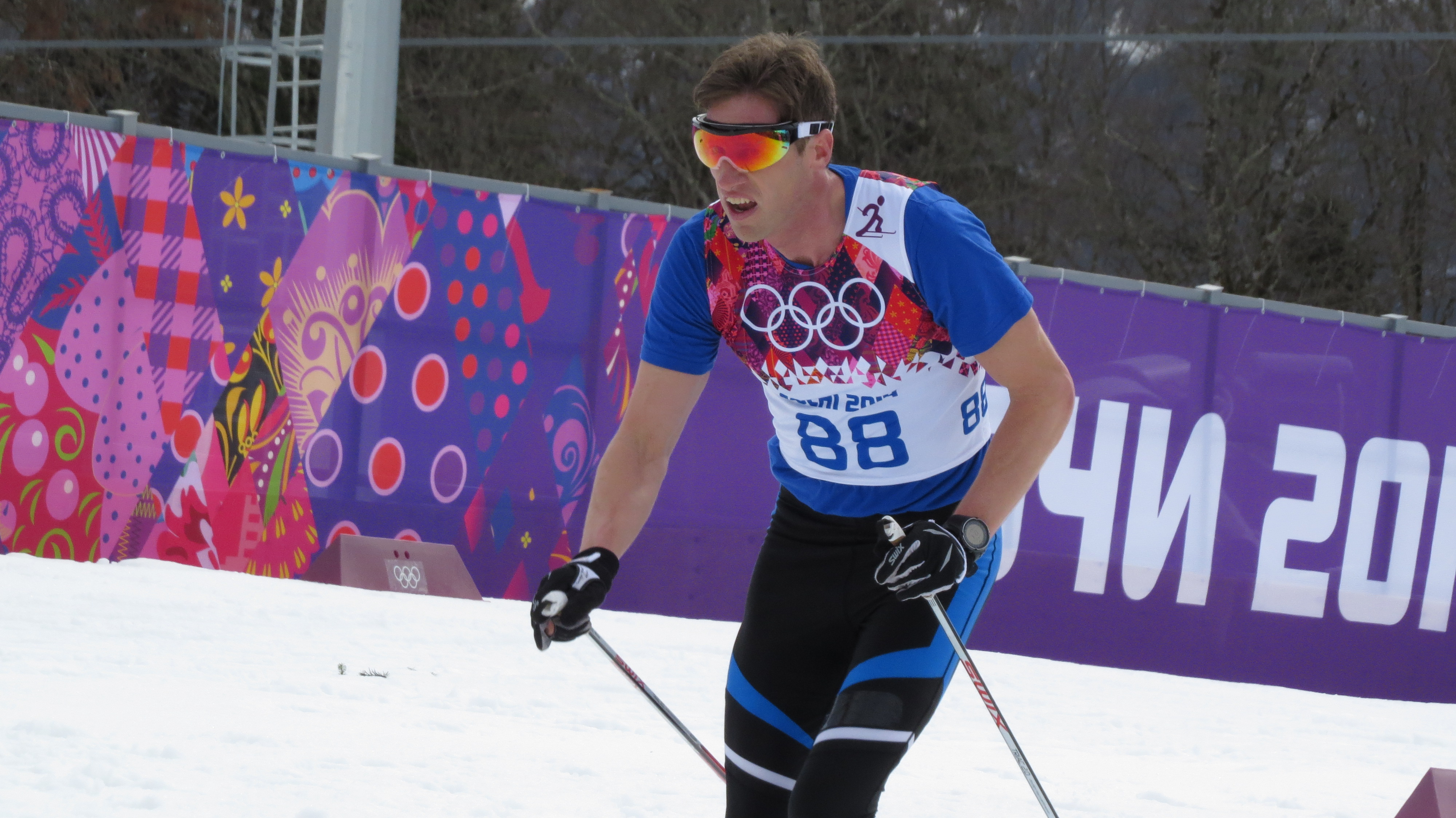

Personal information
- Born: October 21, 1981 (age 44) Dallas, Texas, United States
- Height: 6 ft 4 in (193 cm)
- Weight: 183 lb (83 kg)

Sport
- Country: Bermuda
- Sport: Cross-country skiing

Achievements and titles
- Olympic finals: 2010, 2014, 2018
Medal record
Representing Bermuda

Tucker Murphy (born October 21, 1981) is an American-born British cross-country skier who represents the British Overseas territory of Bermuda and has competed since 2006. He finished 88th in the 15 km event at the 2010 Winter Olympics in Vancouver, British Columbia. He studied at Dartmouth College and Merton College, Oxford.

Murphy's best career finish was 11th in a lesser-known event at Spain in 2009.

Olympic Games
Preceded by Jill Terciera	Flagbearer for Bermuda; Vancouver 2010	Succeeded by Zander Kirkland
Preceded by Zander Kirkland	Flagbearer for Bermuda; Sochi 2014	Succeeded by Tyrone Smith
Preceded by Tyrone Smith	Flagbearer for Bermuda; PyeongChang 2018	Succeeded by Dara Alizadeh
