= Sailing at the 1992 Summer Olympics – Tornado =

Sailing at the Olympics

Tornado at the Games of the XXV Olympiad
- Tornado
- Venue: Barcelona
- Dates: 27 July to 3 August
- Competitors: 44 from 22 nations
- Teams: 22

Medalists
1st place, gold medalist(s)		Yves Loday; Nicolas Hénard	France
2nd place, silver medalist(s)		Randy Smyth; Keith Notary	United States
3rd place, bronze medalist(s)		Mitch Booth; John Robert Forbes	Australia

The Tornado Competition at the 1992 Summer Olympics was held from 27 July to 4 August 1992, in Barcelona, Spain. Points were awarded for placement in each race. The best six out of seven race scores did count for the final placement.

== Results ==
Rank	Helmsman (Country)	Crew	Race I		Race II		Race III		Race IV		Race V		Race VI		Race VII		Total Points	Total -1
Rank	Helmsman (Country)	Crew	Rank	Points	Rank	Points	Rank	Points	Rank	Points	Rank	Points	Rank	Points	Rank	Points	Total Points	Total -1
1	Yves Loday (FRA)	Nicolas Hénard	7	13.0	1	0.0	3	5.7	3	5.7	~~10~~	~~16.0~~	7	13.0	2	3.0	56.4	40.4
2	Randy Smyth (USA)	Keith Notary	1	0.0	2	3.0	~~DSQ~~	~~29.0~~	8	14.0	1	0.0	4	8.0	11	17.0	71.0	42.0
3	Mitch Booth (AUS)	John Forbes	~~10~~	~~16.0~~	4	8.0	6	11.7	6	11.7	2	3.0	1	0.0	5	10.0	60.4	44.4
4	Rex Sellers (NZL)	Brian Jones	13	19.0	12	18.0	~~16~~	~~22.0~~	1	0.0	6	11.7	2	3.0	1	0.0	73.7	51.7
5	David Ross Sweeney (CAN)	Kevin Smith	4	8.0	9	15.0	2	3.0	9	15.0	3	5.7	10	16.0	~~DNC~~	~~29.0~~	91.7	62.7
6	Ron van Teylingen (NED)	Paul Manuel	5	10.0	10	16.0	5	10.0	2	3.0	15	21.0	~~12~~	~~18.0~~	4	8.0	86.0	65.0
7	Andreas Hagara (AUT)	Roman Hagara	6	11.7	6	11.7	1	0.0	~~18~~	~~24.0~~	4	8.0	13	19.0	9	15.0	89.4	65.4
8	Lars Grael (BRA)	Clinio Freitas	~~11~~	~~17.0~~	7	13.0	4	8.0	4	8.0	8	14.0	9	15.0	6	11.7	86.7	69.7
9	Iouri Konovalov (EUN)	Sergey Kravtsov	8	14.0	5	10.0	8	14.0	10	16.0	5	10.0	~~15~~	~~21.0~~	13	19.0	104.0	83.0
10	David Williams (GBR)	Ian Rhodes	12	18.0	~~PMS~~	~~29.0~~	7	13.0	12	18.0	7	13.0	8	14.0	8	14.0	119.0	90.0
11	Roland Gäbler (GER)	Frank Parlow	9	15.0	8	14.0	~~18~~	~~24.0~~	5	10.0	18	24.0	16	22.0	3	5.7	114.7	90.7
12	Carlos Santacreu (ESP)	J.L. Ballester Tuliesa	~~18~~	~~24.0~~	3	5.7	12	18.0	17	23.0	17	23.0	3	5.7	15	21.0	120.4	96.4
13	Charles Favre (SUI)	Markus Bryner	14	20.0	19	25.0	10	16.0	~~16~~	~~22.0~~	13	19.0	5	10.0	7	13.0	125.0	100.0
14	Enrique Figueroa (PUR)	Oscar Mercado Blasini	~~17~~	~~23.0~~	11	17.0	9	15.0	7	13.0	14	20.0	11	17.0	12	18.0	123.0	100.0
15	Per Arne Nilsen (NOR)	Odd Stray	15	21.0	~~18~~	~~24.0~~	11	17.0	15	21.0	12	18.0	6	11.7	10	16.0	128.7	104.7
16	Lars Hendriksen (DEN)	Anette Ree Andersen	2	3.0	15	21.0	~~17~~	~~23.0~~	14	20.0	11	17.0	17	23.0	18	24.0	131.0	107.0
17	Giorgio Zuccoli (ITA)	Angelo Glisoni	3	5.7	16	22.0	14	20.0	~~19~~	~~25.0~~	16	22.0	14	20.0	14	20.0	132.7	107.7
18	Göran Marström (SWE)	Stefan Rahm	~~20~~	~~20.0~~	13	19.0	15	21.0	11	17.0	9	15.0	18	24.0	19	25.0	147.0	121.0
19	Kalevi Kostiainen (FIN)	Markku Kuismin	16	22.0	17	23.0	13	19.0	13	19.0	~~19~~	~~25.0~~	19	25.0	16	22.0	155.0	130.0
20	Reid Kempe (BER)	Jay Kempe	19	25.0	14	20.0	19	25.0	20	26.0	20	26.0	~~DNC~~	~~29.0~~	17	23.0	174.0	145.0
21	Eric Cook (RSA)	Geoff Stevens	~~21~~	~~27.0~~	20	26.0	20	26.0	21	27.0	21	27.0	20	26.0	20	26.0	185.0	158.0
22	Jean Alphonse Braure (ISV)	Charlie Shipway	~~22~~	~~28.0~~	21	27.0	21	27.0	22	28.0	22	28.0	21	27.0	21	27.0	192.0	164.0

DNF = Did Not Finish, DSQ = Disqualified, PMS = Premature Start
Crossed out results did not count for the total result.
= Male, = Female

=== Daily standings ===
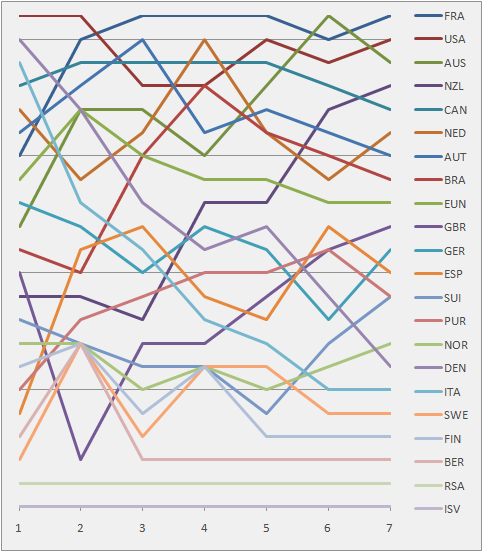
Graph showing the daily standings in the Tornado during the 1992 Summer Olympics
