= Anette Ree Andersen =

Danish sailor

Personal information
- Nationality: Danish
- Born: 16 October 1967 (age 57); Gentofte, Denmark

Sport
- Sport: Sailing

Anette Ree Andersen (born 16 October 1967) is a Danish sailor. She competed in the Tornado event at the 1992 Summer Olympics.
