= Geoff Stevens =

South African sailor (born 1942)

Personal information
- Nationality: South African
- Born: 17 August 1942 (age 82)

Sport
- Sport: Sailing

Geoff Stevens (born 17 August 1942) is a South African sailor. He competed in the Tornado event at the 1992 Summer Olympics.
