= Bermuda at the 2020 Summer Olympics =

- IOC code: BER
- NOC: Bermuda Olympic Association
- Website: www.olympics.bm

in Tokyo, Japan 23 July 2021 – 8 August 2021
- Competitors: 2 in 2 sports
- Flag bearer (opening): Dara Alizadeh
- Flag bearer (closing): N/A
- Medals Ranked 63rd: Gold 1 Silver 0 Bronze 0 Total 1

Summer Olympics appearances (overview)
- 1936; 1948; 1952; 1956; 1960; 1964; 1968; 1972; 1976; 1980; 1984; 1988; 1992; 1996; 2000; 2004; 2008; 2012; 2016; 2020; 2024; 2028

Bermuda competed at the 2020 Summer Olympics in Tokyo. Originally scheduled to take place from 24 July to 9 August 2020, the Games had been postponed to 23 July to 8 August 2021, because of the COVID-19 pandemic. Since the nation's official debut in 1936, Bermudian athletes have appeared in every edition of the Summer Olympic Games, but did not attend the 1980 Summer Olympics in Moscow because of the nation's support for the US-led boycott.

The first ever gold medal for Bermuda was won by triathlete Flora Duffy. During her victory ceremony, the national anthem of the United Kingdom, "God Save the Queen" was played instead of the territorial anthem of Bermuda ("Hail to Bermuda"), as Bermuda is a British overseas territory.

== Medalists ==
Medal	Name	Sport	Event	Date
Gold	Flora Duffy	Triathlon	Women's event	27 July

== Competitors ==
The following is the list of number of competitors in the Games.

Sport	Men	Women	Total
Rowing	1	0	1
Triathlon	0	1	1
Total	1	1	2

== Rowing ==
Bermuda qualified one boat in the men's single sculls for the Games by finishing third in the B-final and securing the second of five berths available at the 2021 FISA Americas Olympic Qualification Regatta in Rio de Janeiro, Brazil.

Athlete	Event	Heats		Repechage		Quarterfinals		Semifinals		Final	
Athlete	Event	Time	Rank	Time	Rank	Time	Rank	Time	Rank	Time	Rank
Dara Alizadeh	Men's single sculls	7:34.96	4 R	7:35.90	2 QF	7:35.73	5 SC/D	7:11.14	3 FC	7:09.91	18

Qualification Legend: FA=Final A (medal); FB=Final B (non-medal); FC=Final C (non-medal); FD=Final D (non-medal); FE=Final E (non-medal); FF=Final F (non-medal); SA/B=Semifinals A/B; SC/D=Semifinals C/D; SE/F=Semifinals E/F; QF=Quarterfinals; R=Repechage

== Triathlon ==
Bermuda entered one triathlete to compete at the Olympics. Remarkably going to her historic fourth Games, Flora Duffy was selected among the top 26 triathletes vying for qualification in the women's event based on the individual ITU World Rankings of 15 June 2021. She won the gold medal.

Athlete	Event	Swim (1.5 km)	Trans 1	Bike (40 km)	Trans 2	Run (10 km)	Total Time	Rank
Flora Duffy	Women's	18:32	0:41	1:02:49	0:34	33:00	1:55:36	1st place, gold medalist(s)

== Non-competing sports ==
=== Equestrian ===
Bermuda entered one dressage rider into the Olympic competition by finishing in the top four, outside the group selection, of the individual FEI Olympic Rankings for Groups D and E (North, Central, and South America), marking the country's recurrence to the sport after an eight-year absence. The quota was later withdrawn, following an injury of Annabelle Collins' main horse Joyero and a failure to obtain minimum eligibility requirements (MER) aboard a new horse Chuppy Checker.

== See also ==
- Bermuda at the 2019 Pan American Games
- Bermuda at the 2020 Summer Paralympics
