= Markus Bryner =

Swiss sailor

Personal information
- Nationality: Swiss
- Born: 29 August 1962 (age 62)

Sport
- Sport: Sailing

Markus Bryner (born 29 August 1962) is a Swiss sailor. He competed in the Tornado event at the 1992 Summer Olympics.
