= 1986 World Junior Championships in Athletics – Men's triple jump =

The men's triple jump event at the 1986 World Junior Championships in Athletics was held in Athens, Greece, at Olympic Stadium on 19 and 20 July.

== Medalists ==
Gold	Igor Parygin; Soviet Union
Silver	Zdravko Dimitrov; Bulgaria
Bronze	Du Benzhong; China

== Results ==
=== Final ===
20 July

Rank	Name	Nationality	Result	Notes
1st place, gold medalist(s)	Igor Parygin	Soviet Union	16.97	
2nd place, silver medalist(s)	Zdravko Dimitrov	Bulgaria	16.13	
3rd place, bronze medalist(s)	Du Benzhong	China	16.00	
4	Jaroslav Mrštík	Czechoslovakia	15.82	
5	Lahor Marinović	Yugoslavia	15.66	
6	Michele Stagnaro	Italy	15.60 w	
7	Lars Hedman	Sweden	15.39	
8	Brian Wellman	Bermuda	15.28	
9	Lawrence Lynch	United Kingdom	15.24	
10	Thomas Wolf	East Germany	15.20	
11	Bruny Surin	Canada	13.30	
	Juan López	Cuba	DQ	(IAAF rule 32.2)

=== Qualifications ===
19 Jul

==== Group A ====
Rank	Name	Nationality	Result	Notes
1	Igor Parygin	Soviet Union	16.10	Q
2	Lars Hedman	Sweden	15.89	Q
3	Thomas Wolf	East Germany	15.78	Q
4	Du Benzhong	China	15.70	Q
5	Bruny Surin	Canada	15.47	q
6	Roberto Giommoni	Italy	15.44	
7	Katsumi Sazanami	Japan	15.43	
8	Aryírios Tsoúlos	Greece	15.15	
9	James Williams	United States	15.11	
10	Patrice Kopoin	Côte d'Ivoire	14.43	
11	Yousef Awad	Egypt	13.93	
12	Lotfi Khaïda	Algeria	13.68	
13	Toyi Simklima	Togo	13.53	
	Timothy Barnes	Australia	NM	
	Nikola Avramov	Bulgaria	NM	
	Edward Manderson	Cayman Islands	NM	

==== Group B ====
Rank	Name	Nationality	Result	Notes
1	Zdravko Dimitrov	Bulgaria	15.82	Q
2	Brian Wellman	Bermuda	15.80	Q
	Lawrence Lynch	United Kingdom	15.80	Q
4	Michele Stagnaro	Italy	15.67	Q
5	Lahor Marinović	Yugoslavia	15.60	Q
6	Jaroslav Mrštík	Czechoslovakia	15.52	Q
7	Stanislav Bobkov	Soviet Union	15.45	
8	Jari Lämsä	Finland	15.21	
9	Glenroy Gilbert	Canada	15.19	
10	Ricardo Valiente	Peru	14.97	
11	René Zeman	Austria	14.93	
12	José Escalera	Puerto Rico	14.76	
13	Rogel Nachum	Israel	14.68	
14	Joe McDonald	United States	14.59	
15	Devon Hyde	Belize	13.55	
	William Akanoa	Cook Islands	NM	
	Juan López	Cuba	DQ	(IAAF rule 32.2) Q

== Participation ==
According to an unofficial count, 33 athletes from 28 countries participated in the event.

- Algeria (1)
- Australia (1)
- Austria (1)
- Belize (1)
- Bermuda (1)
- Bulgaria (2)
- Canada (2)
- Cayman Islands (1)
- China (1)
- Cook Islands (1)
- Côte d'Ivoire (1)
- Cuba (1)
- Czechoslovakia (1)
- East Germany (1)
- Egypt (1)
- Finland (1)
- Greece (1)
- Israel (1)
- Italy (2)
- Japan (1)
- Peru (1)
- Puerto Rico (1)
- Soviet Union (2)
- Sweden (1)
- Togo (1)
- United Kingdom (1)
- United States (2)
- Yugoslavia (1)
