= Carol Ann Blackman =

Bermudian equestrian (born 1947)

Carol Blackman

Personal information
- Full name: Carol Ann Blackman
- Nationality: Bermudian
- Born: 14 October 1947 (age 78); London, England
Medal record
Equestrian
Representing Bermuda
Pan American Games
Silver medal – second place	1991 Chatsworth	Team eventing

Carol Ann Blackman (born 14 October 1947), also known as Carol Blackman or Carol Blackman Shultis, is a Bermudian equestrian. She moved to the United States in 1981 but competed internationally for Bermuda, including at the 1991 Pan American Games (winning a team silver medal) and the 1987 Pan American Games. She competed in the individual eventing at the 1988 Summer Olympics.

== See also ==
- Bermuda at the 1988 Summer Olympics
- Bermuda at the 1991 Pan American Games
