= Raymond Pitman (sailor) =

Bermudan sailor

Personal information
- Nationality: Bermuda
- Born: 5 August 1951 (age 74) Bermuda
- Height: 1.86 m (6.1 ft)

Sport

Sailing career
- Class: Soling
- Updated on 27 February 2020

Raymond Pitman (born 5 August 1951) is a Bermudan sailor who represented his country at the 1976 Summer Olympics in Kingston, Ontario, Canada, as a crew member in the Soling. He, helmsman Richard Belvin and fellow sailor Gordon Flood took 21st place.
