= 1997 Star World Championships =

The 1997 Star World Championships were held in Marblehead, Massachusetts, United States between September 3 and 14, 1997.

== Results ==
Results of individual races
Pos	Crew	Country	I	II	III	IV	V	VI	Tot	Pts
Gold medal	Alexander Hagen; Marcelo Ferreira	Germany	3	36	9	5	1	2	56	20
Silver medal	Mark Reynolds; Magnus Liljedahl	United States	4	10	3	11	7	3	38	27
Bronze medal	Peter Bromby; Michael Marcel	Bermuda	2	3	6	6	16	DNF 72	105	33
4	John A. MacCausland; Phil Trinter	United States	1	2	13	4	15	20	55	35
5	Colin Beashel; David Giles	Australia	10	11	14	3	5	DSQ 72	115	43
6	Howard Shiebler; Rick Peters	United States	DNF 72	5	8	2	6	26	119	47
7	Cuyler Morris; Mike Dorgan	United States	5	6	16	21	DSQ 72	1	121	49
8	Vincent Brun; Rodrigo Meirleles	United States	12	21	31	8	9	4	85	54
9	Larry Whipple; Barry van Leeuwen	United States	9	17	10	53	13	11	113	60
10	Ross Adams; Chuck Nevel	United States	20	19	44	13	11	6	113	69
11	Eric Doyle; Brian Terhaar	United States	15	1	1	1	2	DND 72	149	77
12	Ben Mitchell; Bill Stump	United States	19	24	4	44	4	32	127	83
13	Albert Schweizer; Florian Fendt	Germany	13	DNF 72	12	12	40	12	161	89
14	John King; Wellington de Barros	Brazil	35	44	18	7	25	7	136	92
15	Eduardo Farre; Sergio Bonelli	Argentina	11	20	7	34	30	28	130	96
16	Bill Buchan Jr. Bill Bennett	United States	6	32	46	9	17	34	144	98
17	Peter Vessella; John Rokosz	United States	17	14	5	36	26	39	137	98
18	Dave Watt; Ed Snyders	United States	16	30	36	10	12	DSQ 72	176	104
19	Rob Maine III; Andrew Higgs	United States	18	13	DNF 72	31	22	22	178	106
20	Mike Ilgenstein; Lutz Boguhn	Germany	21	26	15	38	8	41	149	108
21	Andrew Ivey; Scott Zimmer	United States	34	25	11	20	19	DSQ 72	181	109
22	Douglas Wefer; William Burtis	United States	38	37	25	26	24	5	155	117
23	Alberto La Tegola; Giovanni Di Cagno	Italy	28	50	57	14	10	17	176	119
24	Riccardo Simoneschi; Corrado Cristaldini	Italy	22	9	21	27	41	DSQ 72	192	120
25	Joachim Helmich; Martin Nixdorf	Germany	29	7	20	33	32	42	163	121
25	Alberto Zanetti; Juan Pablo Englehard	Argentina	DND 72	15	33	16	14	9	159	126
27	Bill Allen; Eric Beckwith	United States	36	29	2	40	43	19	169	126
28	John Safford; Joe Chambers	United States	43	16	41	17	18	35	170	127
29	Ingvar Krook; Lars Edwall	Sweden	26	51	28	19	21	37	182	131
30	Fran Charles; Ron Sandstrom	United States	59	41	30	30	20	13	193	134
31	Werner Fritz; George Iverson	Germany	7	12	32	42	48	DNC 72	213	141
32	Marc A. Pickel; Carston Witt	Germany	DSQ 72	8	48	37	35	14	214	142
33	Josef Pieper; Lennert Kemp	Germany	32	39	43	35	29	10	188	145
34	Antonio Tamburini; Renzo Ricci	Italy	25	28	45	25	45	24	192	147
35	Jack Rickard; Sam Eadie	United States	55	47	19	15	42	25	203	148
36	Dieter Gast; Patrick Bodden	United States	45	49	26	DND 72	3	15	210	161
37	Jack Slattery; Doug Brophy	United States	23	4	35	DND 72	DNF 72	36	242	170
38	Joe Londrigan; Chris Nielsen	United States	8	OCS 72	24	28	39	DND 72	243	171
39	Sune Carlsson; Benny Nilsson	Sweden	56	27	49	32	23	43	230	174
40	Joe Zambella; Kurt Larson	United States	41	23	47	46	65	18	240	175
41	Rolf Beck; Jurgen Eiermann	Netherlands	33	22	42	29	50	DNF 72	248	176
42	J. Joseph Bainton; Chris Rogers	United States	27	18	54	59	55	23	236	177
43	Pat Londrigan; John Shanahan	United States	31	35	50	24	54	45	239	185
44	Jeannot Walder; Hans Korevaar	Switzerland	44	40	27	55	28	DSQ 72	266	194
45	Tony Hermann; Todd Raynor	United States	50	31	37	23	53	DNC 72	266	194
46	Heinz Maurer; Hans-Jürg Saner	Switzerland	24	33	RET 72	43	27	DSQ 72	271	199
47	Jock Kohlhas; Dave Winkler	United States	39	52	51	22	38	DNF 72	274	202
48	Barton Beek; Joel Kew	United States	RET 72	42	22	39	64	38	277	205
49	Markus Reger; Thorsten Helmert	Germany	30	OCS 72	17	56	31	DSQ 72	278	206
50	Rick Dhein; Dave Marshall	United States	57	43	39	DNF 72	44	27	282	210
51	James A. Freeman; Keith Gardner	United States	DNF 72	48	40	18	33	DSQ 72	283	211
52	Peter U. Wyss; Urs Joss	Switzerland	37	34	38	49	34	DND 72	264	215
53	Tom Londrigan Jr. John Wisnosky	United States	DSQ 72	38	23	58	36	DSQ 72	299	227
54	Dieter Schön; Michael Schön	Germany	14	46	DNF 72	48	47	DSQ 72	299	227
55	Gerhard Meyer; Ronald Seifert	Brazil	40	DSQ 72	53	41	60	33	299	227
56	Dierk Thomsen; Jakob Just	Germany	52	DNF 72	34	50	62	30	300	228
57	David Chittick; Michael Whitford	United States	49	DNC 72	63	57	56	8	305	233
58	Stefan Lehnert; Peter Menning	Germany	48	OCS 72	29	51	37	DSQ 72	309	237
59	Bill Parks; Ken Kazezski	United States	53	45	55	63	61	29	306	243
60	Steve Braverman; Ron Rezac	United States	51	54	64	47	46	47	309	245
61	Ian Bruce; Daniel Kurbiel	Canada	42	58	52	64	66	31	313	247
62	Robert Teitge; Adam Korejsza	United States	54	56	RET 72	62	59	21	324	252
63	Thomas Ramoser; Michael Dietzel	Germany	62	DSQ 72	58	60	57	16	325	253
64	Renato Irrera; Adriano Figone	Italy	47	DNF 72	60	DSQ 72	51	46	348	276
65	John Chiarella; Terry Fletcher	United States	58	57	61	54	67	48	345	278
66	Bruno Prada; Guilherme De Almeida	Brazil	60	DND 72	59	45	52	DSQ 72	360	288
67	David Ivey; Brad Nichol	United States	61	53	RET 72	61	49	DSQ 72	368	296
68	Mario Caprile; Frederico Medilago	Spain	RET 72	55	62	DSQ 72	68	40	369	297
69	G. Calegari; Frederico Calegari	Argentina	DNC 72	DNC 72	DSQ 72	52	58	44	370	298
70	William Watson; Roger Sharp	United States	46	DNF 72	56	65	63	DSQ 72	374	302
71	Kenneth R. Smith; Chris Arleo	United States	DSQ 72	DNC 72	DSQ 72	DNC 72	DNC 72	DNC 72	432	360

Legend: DNC – Did not come to the starting area; DND – Disqualification non discardable; DNF – Did not finish; DSQ – Disqualified; OCS – On the course side of the starting line; RET – Retired;
