= Kalevi Kostiainen =

Finnish sailor

Personal information
- Nationality: Finnish
- Born: 7 March 1967 (age 58); Tuusula, Finland

Sport
- Sport: Sailing

Kalevi Kostiainen (born 7 March 1967) is a Finnish sailor. He competed in the Tornado event at the 1992 Summer Olympics.
