= Charlie Shipway =

United States Virgin Islands sailor

Personal information
- Full name: Charles Morgan Shipway
- Nationality: American Virgin Islander
- Born: January 6, 1968 (age 57)

Sport
- Sport: Sailing

Charles Morgan Shipway (born January 6, 1968) is a sailor who represented the United States Virgin Islands. He competed in the Tornado event at the 1992 Summer Olympics.
