= Bermuda at the Olympics =

- IOC code: BER
- NOC: Bermuda Olympic Association
- Website: www.olympics.bm
- Medals Ranked 113th: Gold 1 Silver 0 Bronze 1 Total 2

Summer appearances
- 1936; 1948; 1952; 1956; 1960; 1964; 1968; 1972; 1976; 1980; 1984; 1988; 1992; 1996; 2000; 2004; 2008; 2012; 2016; 2020; 2024

Winter appearances
- 1992; 1994; 1998; 2002; 2006; 2010; 2014; 2018; 2022–2026

Bermuda first participated at the Olympic Games in 1936, and has sent athletes to compete in every Summer Olympic Games since then, except when they participated in the 1980 Summer Olympics boycott. Bermuda has also participated in every Winter Olympic Games between 1992 and 2018.

With Flora Duffy's gold medal in the women's triathlon in 2021, Bermuda is the smallest country in the world by population to have won a gold medal at the Summer Olympics. From 1976 to 2021, they were the smallest country by population to win a medal overall, but that streak ended when Alessandra Perilli won bronze for San Marino in trap shooting in 2021.

The National Olympic Committee for Bermuda was created in 1935 and recognised by the International Olympic Committee in 1936.

== Medal tables ==
=== Medals by Summer Games ===
Games	Athletes	Gold	Silver	Bronze	Total	Rank
1936 Berlin	5	0	0	0	0	–
1948 London	12	0	0	0	0	–
1952 Helsinki	6	0	0	0	0	–
1956 Melbourne	3	0	0	0	0	–
1960 Rome	9	0	0	0	0	–
1964 Tokyo	4	0	0	0	0	–
1968 Mexico City	6	0	0	0	0	–
1972 Munich	9	0	0	0	0	–
1976 Montreal	16	0	0	1	1	37
1980 Moscow	boycotted					
1984 Los Angeles	12	0	0	0	0	–
1988 Seoul	12	0	0	0	0	–
1992 Barcelona	20	0	0	0	0	–
1996 Atlanta	9	0	0	0	0	–
2000 Sydney	6	0	0	0	0	–
2004 Athens	10	0	0	0	0	–
2008 Beijing	6	0	0	0	0	–
2012 London	8	0	0	0	0	–
2016 Rio de Janeiro	8	0	0	0	0	–
2020 Tokyo	2	1	0	0	1	63
2024 Paris	8	0	0	0	0	–
2028 Los Angeles	future event					
2032 Brisbane	future event					
Total		1	0	1	2	113

=== Medals by Winter Games ===
Games	Athletes	Gold	Silver	Bronze	Total	Rank
1992 Albertville	1	0	0	0	0	–
1994 Lillehammer	1	0	0	0	0	–
1998 Nagano	1	0	0	0	0	–
2002 Salt Lake City	1	0	0	0	0	–
2006 Turin	1	0	0	0	0	–
2010 Vancouver	1	0	0	0	0	–
2014 Sochi	1	0	0	0	0	–
2018 Pyeongchang	1	0	0	0	0	–
2022 Beijing	did not participate					
2026 Milano Cortina	did not participate					
2030 French Alps	future event					
2034 Utah	future event					
Total		0	0	0	0	–

=== Medals by summer sport ===
Sport	Gold	Silver	Bronze	Total
Triathlon	1	0	0	1
Boxing	0	0	1	1
Totals (2 entries)	1	0	1	2

== List of medalists ==
Medal	Name	Games	Sport	Event
Bronze	Clarence Hill	1976 Montreal	Boxing	Men's heavyweight
Gold	Flora Duffy	2020 Tokyo	Triathlon	Women's Triathlon

== See also ==
- List of flag bearers for Bermuda at the Olympics
- Category:Olympic competitors for Bermuda
