= Markku Kuismin =

Finnish sailor (born 1960)

Personal information
- Born: 26 April 1960 (age 64); Helsinki, Finland

Sport
- Sport: Sailing

Markku Kuismin (born 26 April 1960) is a Finnish sailor. He competed in the Tornado event at the 1992 Summer Olympics.
