= Odd Stray =

Norwegian sailor

Personal information
- Nationality: Norwegian
- Born: 18 February 1969 (age 56); Mandal, Norway

Sport
- Sport: Sailing

Odd Stray (born 18 February 1969) is a Norwegian sailor. He competed in the Tornado event at the 1992 Summer Olympics.
