= Lorraine Stubbs =

Canadian equestrian

Personal information
- Full name: Constance Lorraine Stubbs
- Born: 9 June 1950 (age 76); Toronto, Ontario, Canada
Medal record
Equestrian
Representing Canada
Pan American Games
Gold medal – first place	1971 Cali	Team dressage
Gold medal – first place	1991 Havana	Individual dressage
Gold medal – first place	1991 Havana	Team dressage
Silver medal – second place	1975 Mexico City	Team dressage

Constance Lorraine Stubbs (born 9 June 1950) is a Canadian equestrian. She competed at the 1972 Summer Olympics and the 1976 Summer Olympics.
