= Gordon Flood =

Bermudian sailor

Personal information
- Nationality: Bermuda
- Born: 25 October 1940 (age 86) Bermuda
- Height: 1.76 m (5.8 ft)

Sailing career
- Sport: Sailing
- Class: Soling
- Updated on 27 February 2020

Gordon Flood (born 24 October 1940) is a Bermudan sailor who represented his country at the 1976 Summer Olympics in Kingston, Ontario, Canada, as a crew member in the Soling. He, helmsman Richard Belvin and fellow sailor Raymond Pitman took 21st place.
