= Conrad Soares =

Bermudian sailor

Conrad Paul Soares (22 April 1939 – 1 March 2012) was a Bermudian sailor who competed in the 1964 Summer Olympics.
