= Reid Kempe =

Bermudian sailor

Personal information
- Nationality: Bermudian
- Born: 22 October 1950
- Died: August 2015 (aged 64)

Sport
- Sport: Sailing

Reid Kempe (22 October 1950 – August 2015) was a Bermudian sailor. He competed in the Tornado event at the 1992 Summer Olympics.
