= Walter Jones (sailor) =

Bermudian sailor

Personal information
- Nationality: Bermudian
- Born: 16 January 1926; Calgary, Alberta, Canada
- Died: 21 September 2007 (aged 81)

Sport
- Sport: Sailing

Walter James Jones (January 16, 1926 – September 21, 2007) was a Bermudian sailor. He was born in Calgary, Alberta, Canada, and competed at the 1960 Summer Olympics.
