= Glenn Astwood =

Bermudian sailor (born 1954)

Personal information
- Nationality: Bermudian
- Born: 16 November 1954 (age 70)

Sport
- Sport: Sailing

Glenn Astwood (born 16 November 1954) is a Bermudian sailor. He competed in the Tornado event at the 1988 Summer Olympics.
