= Norman Jones (sailor) =

Bermudian sailor

Personal information
- Nationality: Bermudian
- Born: 9 December 1923; Calgary, Alberta, Canada
- Died: 19 October 1995 (aged 71)

Sport
- Sport: Sailing

Norman Charles Jones (9 December 1923 – 19 October 1995) was a Canadian-Bermudian sports figure of the 1950s and 1960s, known for participating in sailing events. A native of Calgary, Alberta, Jones represented Bermuda at the 1960 Summer Olympics.
