= Eddie Bardgett =

Bermudian sailor (born 1955)

Personal information
- Nationality: Bermudian
- Born: 20 May 1955 (age 69)

Sport
- Sport: Sailing

Edward Bardgett (born 20 May 1955) is a Bermudian sailor. He competed in the Tornado event at the 1988 Summer Olympics.
