= Edmund Cooper (swimmer) =

Bermudian swimmer (1912–2003)

Personal information
- Full name: Edmund Merryman Cooper
- Born: 9 September 1912 Pembroke Parish, Bermuda
- Died: January 2003 (aged 90) Pembroke Parish, Bermuda

Sport
- Sport: Swimming

Edmund Merryman Cooper (9 September 1912 – January 2003) was a Bermudian swimmer. He competed in two events at the 1936 Summer Olympics: the men's 400 metres freestyle (with a time of 5:53.8) and the 4×200 metres freestyle relay. His brother, Forster Cooper, and son, Edmund Kirkland Cooper, were also both Olympians—in swimming and sailing, respectively.
