= Eric Cook (sailor) =

South African sailor

Personal information
- Nationality: South African
- Born: 29 May 1942 (age 84)

Sport
- Sport: Sailing

Eric Cook (born 29 May 1942) is a South African sailor. He competed in the Tornado event at the 1992 Summer Olympics.
