= Zander Kirkland =

Bermudian sailor

Alexander "Zander" Kirkland
Personal information
- Nickname: Zender
- Nationality: Bermudan
- Born: Alexander Kirkland; 11 February 1983 (age 43)

Sailing career
- Country: Bermuda
- Sport: Sailing
- Event: 49er
- College team: Tufts University
- Updated on 6 July 2012

Alexander "Zander" Kirkland (born 11 February 1983) is a Bermudian competitive sailor. Kirkland was involved with sailing from a young age, and sailed in college at Tufts University in Massachusetts. Following college, he and his brother Jesse Kirkland began training in an attempt to qualify for the 2012 Olympic Games in London in the 49er event. During the 2012 49er World Championship in Croatia, the brothers finished in the Gold fleet and thereby qualified to represent Bermuda in the 2012 Olympics.

== Career ==
Kirkland is a native of Bermuda, and grew up sailing there. He attended college in the United States at Tufts University in Massachusetts, and sailed while a student. He later moved to Newport Beach, California, where he worked as youth sailing director for the Newport Harbor Yacht Club and as sailing coach at Newport Harbor High School. Two years prior to the 2012 Summer Olympics in London, Kirkland and his brother Jesse Kirkland began training full-time in an attempt to qualify as Bermuda's representatives in the Olympics 49er competition. The 49er, a small two-person racing dinghy, is a relatively new sailing competition for the Olympics, having debuted for the first time at the 2000 Summer Olympics in Sydney, Australia.

At the 2012 World Championships in Croatia at the Sailing Club Uskok, the Kirkland brothers arrived early to gain experience sailing in local conditions. They advanced to the gold fleet after the preliminary qualifying races and later became the first team to secure one of the five remaining Olympic qualifying places that remained at the time after finishing in eighth place out of seventy-four in the final standings. After their success in Croatia, they likewise left early for Weymouth, England, in order to get used to local sailing conditions prior to the start of the Olympic Games. They were one of twenty boats that competed in the 49er competition in the 2012 Olympics, finishing in 19th place.

Olympic Games
Preceded by Tucker Murphy	Flagbearer for Bermuda; London 2012	Succeeded by Tucker Murphy
