= Mickey Johnson (diver) =

Bermudian diver

Personal information
- Full name: Charles Ambrose Johnson
- Nationality: Bermudian
- Born: 5 May 1934 (age 92)
- Died: May 11, 2026 Bermuda

Sport
- Sport: Diving

Charles Ambrose Johnson (born 5 May 1934), also known as Mickey Johnson, is a Bermudian diver. He competed in the men's 3 metre springboard event at the 1952 Summer Olympics.
