= Brownlow Gray =

Bermudian sailor

William Brownlow Gray (October 25, 1931 – November 2010) was a Bermudian sailor. He was born in Montreal, Quebec. He competed for Bermuda at the 1960 Summer Olympics.
