= John Young (swimmer) =

Bermudian swimmer (1917–2006)

Personal information
- Full name: John H. Young Jr.
- Born: 12 January 1917 Somerset, Bermuda
- Died: June 2006 (aged 89) Pembroke Parish, Bermuda

Sport
- Sport: Swimming

John H. Young Jr. (12 January 1917 – June 2006) was a Bermudian swimmer. He competed in two events at the 1936 Summer Olympics.
