= Jillian Terceira =

Bermudian equestrian

Personal information
- Nationality: Bermudian
- Born: 23 July 1971 (age 53)
- Height: 1.63 m (5 ft 4 in)
- Weight: 58 kg (128 lb)

Sport
- Country: Bermuda
- Sport: Equestrian
- Event: Individual Jumping
- Updated on 21 July 2012

Jillian Terceira is a competitive equestrian show jumper based out of Geel, Belgium and is of Bermudan origin. Some of the horses she has successfully competed on include Navanta and Bernadien van Westuur. Terceira competed in the 2008 Summer Olympics and 2012 Summer Olympics on Bermuda's behalf in the individual jumping event.

Olympic Games
Preceded by Patrick Singleton	Flagbearer for Bermuda; Beijing 2008	Succeeded by Tucker Murphy
