= Thelma Jones =

Bermudian sprinter

Personal information
- Nationality: Bermudian
- Born: 15 June 1932 (age 93)

Sport
- Sport: Sprinting
- Event: 100 metres

Thelma Jones (born 15 June 1932) is a Bermudian sprinter. She competed in the women's 100 metres at the 1952 Summer Olympics.
