= Jay Kempe =

Bermudian sailor

Personal information
- Nationality: Bermudian
- Born: 21 August 1952 (age 72)

Sport
- Sport: Sailing

Jay Kempe (born 21 August 1952) is a Bermudian sailor. He competed in the Tornado event at the 1992 Summer Olympics.
