= Brownlow Eve =

Bermudian sailor

Personal information
- Nationality: Bermudian
- Born: 17 March 1905
- Died: 18 May 1992 (aged 87)

Sport
- Sport: Sailing

Brownlow Eve (17 March 1905 – 18 May 1992) was a Bermudian sailor. He competed at the 1956 Summer Olympics and the 1960 Summer Olympics.
