= Alan Burland =

Bermudian sailor (born 1952)

Personal information
- Full name: Alan E. Burland
- Nationality: Bermudian
- Born: 6 September 1952 (age 72); Somerset, Bermuda
- Height: 182 cm (6 ft 0 in)
- Weight: 68 kg (150 lb)

Sailing career
- Class: Tornado

Alan E. Burland (born 6 September 1952) is a Bermudian sailor. He participated at the 1984 Summer Olympics in Los Angeles, where he placed fifth in the multihull class Tornado event, together with Christopher Nash.
