= Adriana Penruddocke =

American sailor

Personal information
- Born: June 14, 2000 (age 25) Morristown, New Jersey, United States

Sport
- Sport: Sailing

Adriana Penruddocke (born June 14, 2000) is an American sailor. She competed at the Women's ILCA 8 and represented as the flag-bearer for Bermuda in the 2024 Summer Olympics.
