= Christopher Nash (sailor) =

Bermudian sailor

Personal information
- Nationality: Bermudian
- Born: 17 November 1952 (age 72)

Sport
- Country: Bermuda
- Sport: Sailing

Christopher Nash (born 17 November 1952) is a Bermudian sailor. He participated at the 1984 Summer Olympics in Los Angeles, where he placed fifth in the multihull class, together with Alan Burland.
