= Jimmy Kempe =

Bermudian sailor

Personal information
- Full name: James Wasson Kempe
- Nationality: Bermudian
- Born: 28 August 1923
- Died: April 2018 (aged 94) Somerset, Bermuda

Sport
- Sport: Sailing

James Wasson Kempe (28 August 1923 – April 2018) was a Bermudian sailor. He competed at the 1956 Summer Olympics and the 1960 Summer Olympics. His sons Reid and Jay Kempe competed together in the 1992 Olympic Games in Barcelona in the Tornado class. His grandsons, Justin and Jonathan Kempe, live in Bermuda and own a yacht charter company.

== Biography ==
In the mid-1950s, Kempe became a founding member and the first president of the Junior Chamber of Commerce, and helped to found the clean-up group that became Keep Bermuda Beautiful. In the early 1970s, he was a founding member of Sandys Rotary Club and president 1976–1977, he was also an honorary life member of the Royal Bermuda Yacht Club.

As a teenager, he raced locally in Bermuda and overseas in the Luders 16 Class and was a member of the Bermuda Offshore Cruising Association. He represented Bermuda at three world championships — Larchmont 1983, Edinburgh 1985, and Clyde 1987.

His father, James Wasson Kempe, was a Collector of Customs, while his mother, Mabel Gertrude Kempe, a music teacher, was active in the island's suffragette movement. Kempe was the youngest of five: his sister, Eleanor McGavern, was a nurse; brother Wilbur Kempe, known as Winky, founded Bermuda Forwarders, while Bill Kempe was a World War II veteran and founding partner of the firm Appleby, Spurling and Kempe, and his sister Lois Aitchison, a Juilliard graduate, became a musician. Through his brother, Bill, Jimmy was also the uncle of actor Will Kempe.

Kempe studied engineering and fine arts at Mount Allison Academy in Canada, but spent a year in hospital for polio.

He married Elizabeth "Betty" Reid in Canada in 1947, whom with he had three children: Reid, Jay, and Jennifer. They returned home to set up a craft shop, specializing in leather handbags for Cecile's. He set up the shop Kempecraft a year later and branched out into jewelry, painting and ceramics. He trained as an engraver of silver in 1948, becoming the island's specialist.

According to his family, his work appeared on "all major local trophies", as well as silver gifts, including items for visiting world leaders including the Queen, the Pope, President Nixon, British Prime Minister Edward Heath, and Haile Selassie, the Emperor of Ethiopia.
