= Suzanne Dunkley =

Bermudian equestrian

Personal information
- Full name: Suzanne E. Dunkley Zandvoort
- Nationality: Bermudian
- Born: 28 March 1956 (age 69)

Sport
- Sport: Equestrian

Suzanne E. Dunkley Zandvoort (born 28 March 1956) is a Bermudian equestrian who competed at the 1992 Summer Olympics and the 1996 Summer Olympics.
