= Victor Ruberry =

Bermudian swimmer (born 1959)

Personal information
- Born: 23 August 1959 (age 66)

Sport
- Sport: Swimming

Victor Ruberry (born 23 August 1959) is a Bermudian swimmer. He competed at the 1984 Summer Olympics and the 1988 Summer Olympics.
