= Bill Trott =

Bermudian sprinter

Personal information
- Full name: William O. Trott
- Nationality: Bermudian
- Born: 20 March 1965 (age 61)

Sport
- Sport: Sprinting
- Event: 100 metres

William O. Trott (born 20 March 1965) is a Bermudian sprinter. He competed in the 100 metres at the 1984 Summer Olympics and the 1988 Summer Olympics.
