= Tyrone Smith (athlete) =

Bermudian long jumper

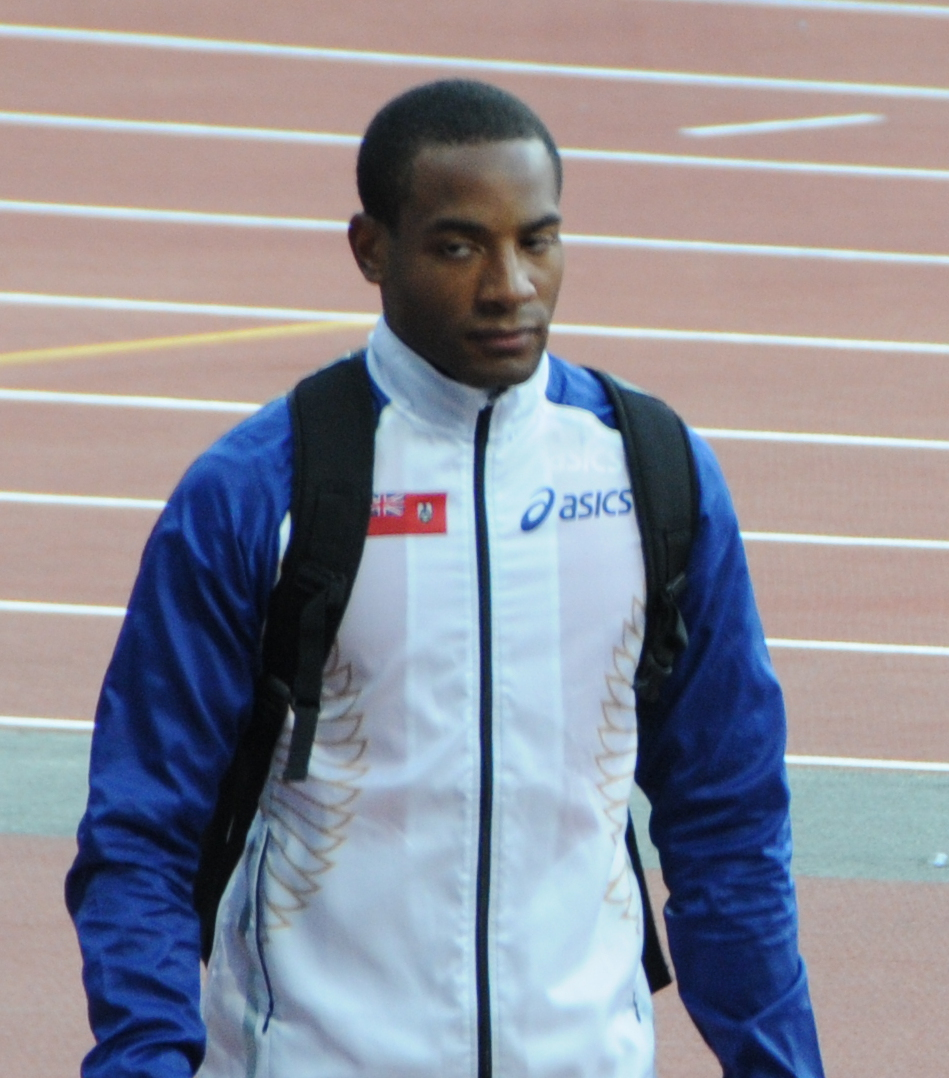
- Smith at the 2012 Summer Olympics

Personal information
- Full name: Tyrone Mark Eugene Smith
- Born: 7 August 1984 (age 41) Paget, Bermuda
- Height: 1.83 m (6 ft 0 in)
- Weight: 74 kg (163 lb)

Sport
- Country: Bermuda
- Sport: Athletics
- Event: Long Jump
- Updated on 26 December 2014

Tyrone Smith (born 7 August 1984) is a Bermudian long jumper.

Smith grew up in the Chicago suburb of North Chicago where he attended NCCHS and Novak-King Middle School. At NCCHS he was a member of the track and field team as well as the football team. Following high school he pursued a collegiate career in both sports at the University of Missouri-Rolla (UMR), now the Missouri University of Science and Technology, eventually deciding after his freshman year to concentrate in track and field. Smith Is a 3 time NCAA Division II All-American in the long jump. He holds the school records at both the indoor and outdoor long jump. He won Bermuda's Athlete of the Year three times, 2011, 2012 and 2013.

Smith is now represented by Kallas Management.

He has competed at the 2008 World Indoor Championships and the 2008 Olympic Games without reaching the final. He competed in the 2010 Commonwealth Games for Bermuda. Smith reached the finals of the 2012 Olympic Games.

Smith competed for Bermuda at the 2016 Summer Olympics in long jump, but did not qualify for the finals. He was the flag bearer for Bermuda during the Parade of Nations.

== Personal bests ==
His personal best jump is 8.34 metres, achieved 5 May 2017 on a gold medal winning performance in Houston, United States. This is the Bermuda National Record.

Event	Result	Venue	Date
Outdoor
100 m	10.83 s (wind: +2.0 m/s)	Rensselaer, United States	6 May 2006
200 m	22.18 s (wind: 0.0 m/s)	Arlington, United States	29 March 2008
Long jump	8.34 m (wind: +2.0 m/s)	Houston, United States	5 May 2017
Indoor
Long jump	7.82 m	Tartu, Estonia	9 February 2012

== Achievements ==
Year	Competition	Venue	Position	Notes
Representing Bermuda
2006	NACAC U23 Championships	Santo Domingo, Dominican Republic	3rd	7.90 m (+0.7 m/s)
2007	NACAC Championships	San Salvador, El Salvador	7th	7.38 m
2007	Pan American Games	Rio de Janeiro, Brazil	14th (q)	7.32 m
2008	World Indoor Championships	Valencia, Spain	18th (q)	7.38 m
2008	Central American and Caribbean Championships	Cali, Colombia	3rd	7.80 m
2008	Olympic Games	Beijing, China	15th (q)	7.91 m
2009	World Championships	Berlin, Germany	31st (q)	7.72 m
2010	World Indoor Championships	Doha, Qatar	25th (q)	7.45 m
2010	Central American and Caribbean Games	Mayagüez, Puerto Rico	1st	8.22 m NR
2010	Commonwealth Games	Delhi, India	5th	7.76 m
2011	Central American and Caribbean Championships	Mayagüez, Puerto Rico	1st	8.06 m
2011	World Championships	Daegu, South Korea	19th (q)	7.91 m
2012	World Indoor Championships	Istanbul, Turkey	10th (q)	7.80 m
2012	Olympic Games	London, United Kingdom	12th	7.70 m
2013	World Championships	Moscow, Russia	13th (q)	7.89 m
2014	Commonwealth Games	Glasgow, United Kingdom	8th	7.79 m
2014	Central American and Caribbean Games	Xalapa, Mexico	11th	7.17 m A (-1.5 m/s)
2015	Pan American Games	Toronto, Canada	4th	8.07 m (w)
2015	World Championships	Beijing, China	10th	7.79 m
2016	Olympic Games	Rio de Janeiro, Brazil	16th (q)	7.81 m
2017	World Championships	London, United Kingdom	13th (q)	7.88 m
2018	World Indoor Championships	Birmingham, United Kingdom	11th	7.75 m
2018	Commonwealth Games	Gold Coast, Australia	10th	7.79 m
2018	Central American and Caribbean Games	Barranquilla, Colombia	2nd	8.03 m
2018	NACAC Championships	Toronto, Canada	4th	7.98 m
2019	Pan American Games	Lima, Peru	5th	7.74 m
2019	World Championships	Doha, Qatar	25th (q)	7.49 m

Olympic Games
Preceded by Tucker Murphy	Flagbearer for Bermuda; Rio de Janeiro 2016	Succeeded by Tucker Murphy
