= Jay Hooper (sailor) =

Bermudian sailor

Personal information
- Full name: Jay Cameron Hooper
- Nationality: Bermudian
- Born: 30 December 1943 (age 81)

Sport
- Sport: Sailing

Jay Cameron Hooper (born 30 December 1943) is a Bermudian sailor. He competed at the 1964 Summer Olympics and the 1968 Summer Olympics.
