= Kirk Cooper =

Bermudian sailor (1932–2018)

Edmund Kirkland Cooper OBE (28 July 1932 – 30 November 2018) was a Bermudian sailor who competed in the 1964 Summer Olympics in Japan, racing in the Dragon class, (coming close to a bronze medal, arriving in 4th place overall in their class) in the 1968 Summer Olympics in Mexico, in the Dragon class and in the 1972 Summer Olympics in Kiel, Germany, racing in the international Soling class. He was the Olympic flag bearer for Bermuda at the Opening Ceremony in Munich. He was also selected as one of the international jurors for the America's Cup, in 1983, when Australia II won the Cup.

The 1983 America's Cup was the occasion of the first winning challenge to the New York Yacht Club, which had successfully defended the cup over a period of 132 years. An Australian syndicate representing the Royal Perth Yacht Club fielded the Australia II, skippered by John Bertrand against defender Liberty, skippered by Dennis Conner, won the match races to win the America's Cup, ending the longest winning streak in sporting history and ending American domination of the racing series.

Alan Bond arrived at Newport with Australia II, billed as one of the biggest threats to American dominance of the 12 Metre class. The boat was designed by Ben Lexcen and skippered by John Bertrand. The revolutionary "winged" keel of the Australian yacht was a subject of controversy from the outset of the challenger series, with the New York Yacht club alleging that the winged keel boat was not a legal 12 Meter, and that the keel design itself was the result of Dutch engineers, and not by Lexcen. This second point would make Australia II illegal under the requirement that the boat be "designed and constructed in country" as the Deed of Gift that governed the competition stipulated.[2] The boat was ruled a legal 12 Meter, and she was allowed to participate in the regatta. The speed of the new contender, along with the controversy and protests intensified international media attention to the series.

His father, Edmund Merriman Cooper and his uncle, Forster Cooper, were Bermudian Olympic athletes as well, and competed as swimmers in the 1936 Summer Olympics in Berlin, Germany.
