= Mary Jane Tumbridge =

Bermudian equestrian

M.J. Tumbridge

Personal information
- Full name: Mary Jane Tumbridge
- Nationality: Bermudian
- Born: 12 July 1964 (age 62)
Medal record
Equestrian
Representing Bermuda
Pan American Games
Gold medal – first place	1999 Winnipeg	Individual eventing
Silver medal – second place	1991 Chatsworth	Team eventing
Bronze medal – third place	1991 Chatsworth	Individual eventing

Mary Jane "M.J." Tumbridge (born 12 July 1964) is a Bermudian equestrian. She competed at the 1992 Summer Olympics and the 2000 Summer Olympics. She was the first sportsperson from Bermuda to win a gold medal at the Pan Am Games, and is considered to be the best equestrian from the country.

== Biography ==
Tumbridge was born in 1964 in Bermuda and began horse riding at the age of seven. At the age of eighteen, Tumbridge moved to the United States to compete in competitions, before moving to England in 1992. At the 1991 Pan American Games, Tumbridge won a silver medal, and six years later, at the 1999 Pan American Games, she won gold. Also in 1999, she was named as Bermuda's Female Athlete of the Year.

At the Olympic Games, Tumbridge competed in the individual eventing at the 1992 Summer Olympics, and the same discipline at the 2000 Summer Olympics. She was also the flag bearers for Bermuda at the 2000 Olympics.

At the 2000 Summer Olympics, Tumbridge rode the horse "Bermuda's Gold", the same horse she had won her gold medal at the Pan American Games a year earlier. However, during the Olympics, the horse broke her left hind leg, and was euthanised. This was the first time since the 1968 Summer Olympics that a horse was put down at the Olympics.

Following the Olympics, Tumbridge became a horse riding coach in England.
