= Brian Wellman =

Bermudian triple jumper

Personal information
- Born: September 8, 1967 (age 59)

Sport
- Sport: Track and field
- Club: Arkansas Razorbacks
Medal record
Representing Bermuda
World Championships
| Silver medal – second place | 1995 Gothenburg | Triple jump |
World Indoor Championships
| Gold medal – first place | 1995 Barcelona | Triple jump |
| Bronze medal – third place | 1993 Toronto | Triple jump |
Commonwealth Games
| Bronze medal – third place | 1994 Victoria | Triple jump |
Summer Universiade
| Gold medal – first place | 1991 Sheffield | Triple jump |

Brian Wellman (born September 8, 1967) is a former triple jumper from Bermuda, who became indoor world champion in 1995, setting a new championship record (CR) of 17.72. His personal best outdoors was 17.62 metres. Both these marks are Bermudian records. In addition, he has a wind-assisted (+7.1 m/s) mark of 17.75 metres.

Wellman competed collegiately for the University of Arkansas where he won two NCAA Outdoor triple jump titles.

== Achievements ==
| Year | Competition | Venue | Position | Notes |
Representing Bermuda
| 1986 | CARIFTA Games | Les Abymes, Guadeloupe | 1st | 15.87 m w |
| 1986 | World Junior Championships | Athens, Greece | 8th | 15.28 m (wind: -1.4 m/s) |
| 1991 | World Championships | Tokyo, Japan | 6th | 16.98 m |
| 1991 | Universiade | Sheffield, England | 1st | 17.07 m |
| 1992 | Olympic Games | Barcelona, Spain | 5th | 17.24 m |
| 1993 | World Indoor Championships | Toronto, Canada | 3rd | 17.27 m |
| 1993 | World Championships | Stuttgart, Germany | 8th | 17.12 m |
| 1994 | Commonwealth Games | Victoria, Canada | 3rd | 17.00 m |
| 1995 | World Indoor Championships | Barcelona, Spain | 1st | 17.72 m |
| 1995 | World Championships | Gothenburg, Sweden | 2nd | 17.62 m w (wind: +2.7 m/s) |
| 1996 | Olympic Games | Atlanta, United States | 6th | 16.95 m |
| 1997 | World Championships | Athens, Greece | 5th | 17.22 m |
| 1999 | Central American and Caribbean Championships | Bridgetown, Barbados | 1st | 17.01 m |
| 2001 | Central American and Caribbean Championships | Guatemala City, Guatemala | 1st | 17.24 m A |
| 2001 | World Championships | Edmonton, Canada | 6th | 16.81 m |
| 2002 | Commonwealth Games | Manchester, England | 8th | 15.84 m |
| 2003 | Pan American Games | Santo Domingo, Dominican Republic | 9th | 15.31 m |

== World rankings ==
Wellman was ranked among the top ten triple jumpers in the world by Track and Field News on seven occasions:

| Year | Event | World rank |
|---|---|---|
| 1992 | Triple Jump | 5th |
| 1993 | Triple Jump | 8th |
| 1994 | Triple Jump | 3rd |
| 1995 | Triple Jump | 3rd |
| 1996 | Triple Jump | 5th |
| 1997 | Triple Jump | 9th |
| 2001 | Triple Jump | 10th |

Olympic Games
| Preceded by Clarence Saunders | Flagbearer for Bermuda; Barcelona 1992; Atlanta 1996 | Succeeded by Mary Jane Tumbridge |
