= Penny Simmons =

Bermudian sailor (1938–2024)

Eugene Scott "Penny" Simmons (15 November 1938 – 26 September 2024) was a Bermudian sailor who competed in the 1964 Summer Olympics, 1968 Summer Olympics, 1972 Summer Olympics, and 1976 Summer Olympics. He finished third in the 1967 Pan American Games Snipe (with Richard Belvin), and won the International One Design World Championships six times, and the Snipe Western Hemisphere & Orient Championship in 1956. Simmons died on 26 September 2024, at the age of 85.
