= Peter Bromby =

Bermudian sailor

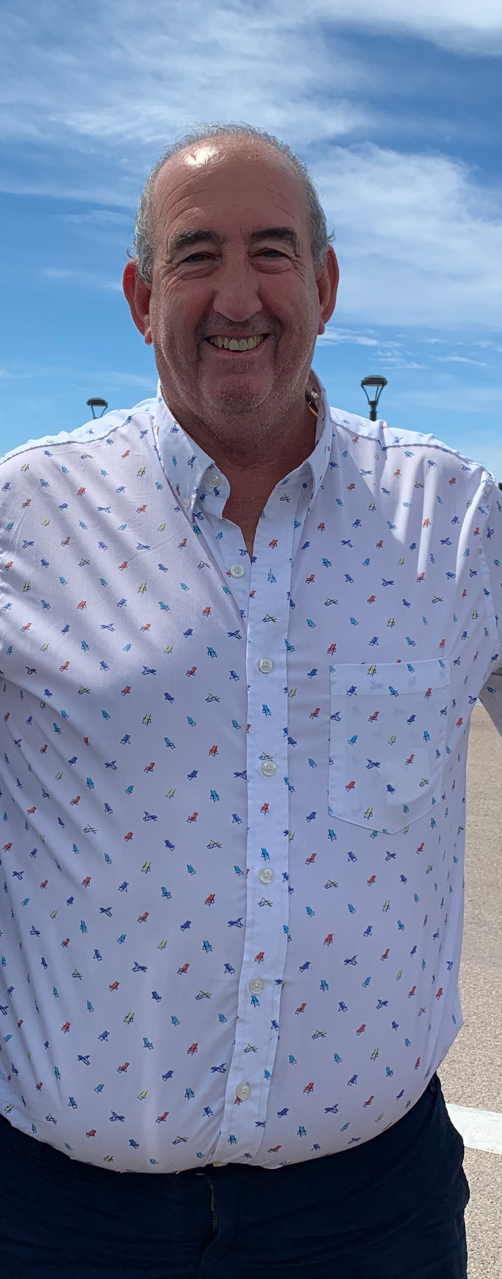

Personal information
- Full name: Peter Frederick Bromby
- Nationality: Bermuda
- Born: 26 August 1964 (age 62) Sandys Parish, Bermuda
- Height: 1.93 m (6 ft 4 in)
- Weight: 114 kg (251 lb)

Sailing career
- Sport: Sailing
- Club: Sandys Boat Club
- Class: Star
Medal record
Men's sailing
Representing Bermuda
World Championships
Bronze medal – third place	1997 Marblehead	Star

Peter Frederick Bromby (born August 26, 1964 in Sandys Parish) is a Bermudian keelboat sailor, who specialized in Star class. He represented Bermuda in four editions of the Olympic Games (1992, 1996, 2000, and 2004), and has earned the third highest placement in the nation's Olympic history with an astonishing fourth-place finish. Bromby also captured a bronze medal, along with Michael Marcel, at the 1997 Star World Championships in Marblehead, Massachusetts, United States with a net total of 33 points.

== Career ==
=== 1992 Olympics ===
Bromby made his official debut at the 1992 Summer Olympics in Barcelona, where he placed nineteenth in the Star class, along with his partner and crew member Paul Fisher, with a net score of 119 points.

=== 1996 Olympics ===
At the 1996 Summer Olympics in Atlanta, Bromby posted a remarkable grade of 81 to pull off a thirteenth-place effort on the entire series while teaming up with his new partner Lee White in the same program.

=== 2000 Olympics ===
Following his mediocre performances in two straight Games, Bromby and his crew member White narrowly missed the podium in the Star class at the 2000 Summer Olympics in Sydney. The Bermudian duo accumulated a net score of 45.3 points at the end of the opening series, finishing six points off bronze medalists and Brazilians Torben Grael and Marcelo Ferreira.

=== 2004 Olympics ===
Twelve years after competing in his first Olympics, Bromby qualified for his fourth Bermudian team, as a 39-year-old, in the Star class at the 2004 Summer Olympics in Athens. After achieving a fourth-place finish from Sydney, Bromby was appointed as the Bermudian flag bearer by the National Olympic Committee in the opening ceremony. Teaming again with White in the opening series, the Bermudian duo delivered an effortless eighth-place effort, including a powerful lead on the ninth leg, in a fleet of seventeen boats with a net total of 82 points.

Olympic Games
Preceded by Patrick Singleton	Flagbearer for Bermuda; Athens 2004	Succeeded by Patrick Singleton
