= Clarence Hill (boxer) =

Bermudian boxer (born 1951)

Personal information
- Nationality: British (Bermuda)
- Born: 26 June 1951 (age 75)
- Weight: Heavyweight

Boxing career

Boxing record
- Wins: 19
- Losses: 3
- Draws: 1

Olympic medal record

Men's Boxing

Representing Bermuda
Bronze medal – third place	1976 Montreal	Heavyweight

Clarence Hill (born 26 June 1951) is a Bermudian retired boxer. At the 1976 Summer Olympics he won a bronze medal in the Heavyweight division, making Hill the first athlete from Bermuda to win an Olympic medal and the only one until 2021.

== Early life ==
Clarence Hill was born in 1951 to parents Ruth and Rupert Hill. He attended the Central School and Heron Bay junior schools in Bermuda. He was introduced to boxing after moving to New Jersey in the United States and attending Clinton Place Junior High. After watching Muhammad Ali, Hill was encouraged to become a professional boxer. He returned to Bermuda at 17 and began boxing with the Bermuda Police Service and the Bermuda Boxing Association. He participated in at least 27 fights, winning all of them, which made him eligible for the 1976 Summer Olympics.

== Professional career ==
Hill competed at the 1976 Summer Olympics in Montreal, winning bronze in the heavyweight division and becoming the first Bermudan to win an Olympic medal. After the Olympics, Hill was offered to be trained by George Francis in England, but was unable to due to having been convicted of marijuana possession when he was 19 years old. Hill made his professional debut in 1980 against British boxer David Fry, winning the match with a first-round knockout. After winning his first twelve fights, Hill took on future WBA champ Tony Tubbs at the University of New Mexico in August 1982. He finished his career with a final pro record of 18 wins (13 by knockout), three losses and a draw.

In 2004, the Bermuda Sports Hall of Fame was created, and Hill was not included, causing controversy. The exclusion of Hill was suspected to be due to his time incarcerated, despite him being at the time the only Bermudan to win an Olympic medal. He was inducted into the Hall of Fame in 2005. In 2019, he was awarded $10,000 "in honour of his international achievements in boxing". Additionally, the Clarence Hill Multi-Purpose Gymnasium was named in his honor.

== Personal life ==
After retiring from boxing, Hill struggled mentally, and served time in prison for various offenses. He subsequently improved his life and began training young boxers. He strongly believes that people struggling can turn their lives around. During his second time in prison, he got over his drug addiction and was reschooled as a carpenter.
