= Richard Belvin =

Bermudian sailor (born 1941)

Personal information
- Born: 26 August 1941 (age 84) Paget, Bermuda

Sport
- Country: Bermuda
- Sport: Sailing

Richard Belvin (born 26 August 1941) is a Bermudian sailor. He competed at the 1968 Summer Olympics in Acapulco, in the dragon class and in the 1972 Summer Olympics in Kiel, in the dragon and the 1976 Summer Olympics in Kingston, Ontario, in the Soling. He finished third in the 1967 Pan American Games snipe (with Penny Simmons). He was born in Paget, Bermuda.
