= Bermuda Olympic Association =

National Olympic Committee for Bermuda

- Country/Region: Bermuda
- Code: BER
- Created: 1935
- Recognized: 1936
- Continental Association: PASO
- President: Peter Dunne
- Secretary General: Branwen Smith-King
- Website: olympics.bm

The Bermuda Olympic Association (IOC code: BER) is the National Olympic Committee representing Bermuda. The committee is also the Commonwealth Games Association representing the island nation.

== History ==
Bermuda Olympic Association was founded in 1968 and recognised by the International Olympic Committee in the same year.

== See also ==
- Bermuda at the Olympics
- Bermuda at the Commonwealth Games
