= Deaths in February 1990 =

The following is a list of notable deaths in February 1990.

Entries for each day are listed alphabetically by surname. A typical entry lists information in the following sequence:

- Name, age, country of citizenship at birth, subsequent country of citizenship (if applicable), reason for notability, cause of death (if known), and reference.

== February 1990 ==
=== 1 ===
- Ray Bateman Jr., 34, American Olympic luger (1980, 1984).
- Roy "Goose" Burris, 88, American basketball player.
- Gianfranco Contini, 78, Italian academic and philologist.
- Lauritz Falk, 80, Swedish-Norwegian actor.
- Peter Racine Fricker, 69, English composer, throat cancer.
- Hassan Ibrahim, 73, Egyptian Air Force officer.
- Yeghishe Derderian of Jerusalem, 78, Israeli Armenian patriarch (since 1960), heart attack.
- Jadwiga Wajs, 78, Polish Olympic discus thrower (1932, 1936).

=== 2 ===
- Kathleen Hamilton, Duchess of Abercorn, 84, British Mistress of the Robes (since 1964).
- Paul Ariste, 84, Soviet linguist.
- Paul Arzens, 86, French industrial automotive designer.
- Benedict Daswa, 43, South African educator, beaten to death.
- Enrico De Pedis, 35, Italian gangster, homicide.
- Joel Fluellen, 82, American actor, suicide by gunshot.
- Mel Lewis, 60, American drummer, skin cancer.
- Sigbjørn Bernhoft Osa, 79, Norwegian fiddler.
- Hans Schumm, 93, German-American actor, heart failure.
- Don Welsh, 78, English football player.

=== 3 ===
- Erv Kantlehner, 97, American baseball player (Pittsburgh Pirates, Philadelphia Phillies).
- Willibald Kirbes, 87, Austrian football player.
- Pete Mount, 64, American basketball player.
- Jane Novak, 94, American actress, stroke.
- Pa Tepaeru Terito Ariki, 66, Cook Islander lyricist ("Te Atua Mou E").
- Marcel Thévenet, 74, French weightlifter and Olympian (1948, 1952).

=== 4 ===
- Zé Beto, 29, Portuguese footballer, traffic collision.
- Jean Galloway Bissell, 53, American judge, cancer.
- Leonard J. Fick, 74, American academic, heart disease.
- Maria Gambarelli, 89, Italian-American actress and dancer.
- Berta Karlik, 86, Austrian physicist.
- Archibald Ross Lewis, 75, American historian.
- Kate Simon, 77, Polish-American writer.
- Whipper Billy Watson, 72, Canadian wrestler and trainer.

=== 5 ===
- W. W. Bartley III, 55, American philosopher, bladder cancer.
- Edgar Herschler, 71, American politician, governor of Wyoming (1975–1987), cancer.
- Père Marie-Benoît, 94, French humanitarian.
- Joseph Mauclair, 83, French road bicycle racer from 1927 to 1938.
- Joseph J. Nazzaro, 76, American Air Force general, cancer.
- King Perry, 75, American musician.

=== 6 ===
- Bin Akao, 91, Japanese politician, heart failure.
- Jeannine Auboyer, 77, French museum curator.
- Bernard Bernstein, 81, American economist, cardiac arrest.
- Zari Elmassian, 83, American singer and actress.
- John Merivale, 72, Canadian-British actor, kidney failure.
- Olavi Ouvinen, 63, Finnish Olympic boxer (1948).
- Kiro Ristov, 36, Yugoslavian Olympic wrestler (1976, 1980).
- Jimmy Van Heusen, 77, American composer, complications from a stroke.

=== 7 ===
- Thomas Clark, 83, American Olympic rower (1932).
- Tony Fomison, 50, New Zealand artist.
- Max Koecher, 66, German mathematician.
- Alan Perlis, 67, American computer scientist, heart attack.
- Alfredo M. Santos, 84, Filipino general.

=== 8 ===
- Rhys Adrian, 61, British playwright and screenwriter.
- Bernice Carey, 78–79, American mystery writer.
- Cassius Marcellus Clay Sr., 77, American painter and musician, father of Muhammad Ali, heart attack.
- George de Mestral, 82, Swiss electrical engineer and inventor of velcro.
- Xu Deheng, 99, Chinese politician.
- Han Engelsman, 70, Dutch footballer.
- Katalin Karády, 79, Hungarian actress and singer.
- Pete Kmetovic, 70, American football player (Philadelphia Eagles, Detroit Lions).
- Charles Maclean, Baron Maclean, 73, British hereditary peer.
- Del Shannon, 55, American musician, suicide by gunshot.
- Ernest William Titterton, 73, British nuclear physicist, pulmonary embolism.

=== 9 ===
- James Fleming Gordon, 71, American judge.
- Ilse Hollweg, 67, German opera singer.
- Joachim Hunger, 32, German Olympic sailor (1984, 1988).
- Saroj Mukherjee, 79, Indian freedom fighter and politician.
- John Poelker, 76, American politician.
- Jan Wojnowski, 43, Polish weightlifter and Olympian (1968, 1972).

=== 10 ===
- Clara González, 88, Panamanian feminist, judge, and activist.
- Knut Hansson, 78, Swedish footballer.
- Luigi Musina, 75, Italian boxer.
- John Arthur Pilcher, 77, British diplomat.
- Bill Sherwood, 37, American musician and filmmaker, AIDS.
- Tony Solaita, 43, American baseball player, shot.

=== 11 ===
- Léopold Anoul, 67, Belgian football player.
- Tom Brennan, 59, American basketball player (Philadelphia Warriors).
- Marie-Dominique Chenu, 95, French theologian.
- Bonnie Izzard, 81, Australian rules footballer.
- Enrique Kistenmacher, 66, Argentine Olympic athlete (1948).
- Colin Henderson Roberts, 80, British classical scholar.

=== 12 ===
- Joseph Peter Michael Denning, 83, American Roman Catholic prelate.
- Erling Enger, 90, Norwegian painter.
- Harold McCusker, 50, Northern Irish politician, cancer.
- Victor Pokrovsky, 92, Russian choir director, translator, and music arranger.
- Nenad Radulović, 30, Yugoslav singer, testicular cancer.

=== 13 ===
- Binyomin Beinush Finkel, 78–79, Soviet-Israeli rabbi.
- Angela Gregory, 86, American sculptor.
- Heinz Haber, 76, German physicist.
- Manuel Rodriguez Lopez, 55, Galician poet and writer.
- Ken Lynch, 79, American actor, viral illness.
- Alberto Ortiz, 66, Uruguayan pentathlete.
- Leon Stein, 77–78, American writer.

=== 14 ===
- Armistead L. Boothe, 82, American politician.
- Michel Drach, 59, French filmmaker.
- Graeme Hole, 59, Australian cricketer, cancer.
- Tony Holiday, 38, German singer, AIDS.
- Slick Johnson, 41, American racing driver, racing collision.
- Dick Martin, 62, American artist.
- José Luis Panizo, 68, Spanish footballer.
- John M. Robsion Jr., 85, American politician, member of the U.S. House of Representatives (1953–1959).
- Fritz Schulz-Reichel, 77, German pianist.
- Jean Wallace, 66, American actress, gastrointestinal bleeding.
- Luděk Čajka, 26, Czechoslovak ice hockey player, spinal cord injury.

=== 15 ===
- Keyes Beech, 76, American journalist and Pulitzer Prize winner.
- Henry Brandon, 77, German-American actor, heart attack.
- George Daney, 43, American football player (Kansas City Chiefs), carbon monoxide poisoning.
- Dolores Faith, 48, American actress, suicide.
- Ulf Johanson, 68, Swedish actor.
- Frans Kellendonk, 39, Dutch novelist, AIDS.
- Dorival Knippel, 72, Brazilian footballer.
- Jack C. Massey, 85, American businessman, pneumonia.
- Norman Parkinson, 76, English photographer.
- Rudolf Schaad, 88, Russian-German film editor.

=== 16 ===
- John Eastaugh, 69, British Anglican prelate.
- Keith Haring, 31, American artist, AIDS.
- John Davis Larkins Jr., 80, American district judge.
- Nurul Momen, 81, Bangladeshi playwright.
- Luis Ortiz Monasterio, 83, Mexican sculptor.
- József Moravetz, 79, Romanian football player.
- Tadanari Okamoto, 58, Japanese animator.
- Volodymyr Scherbytsky, 71, Soviet and Ukrainian politician, pneumonia.
- Joshua Shelley, 70, American actor.
- J. C. Trewin, 81, British journalist.

=== 17 ===
- Robert Bernard, 76, German Olympic footballer (1936).
- Jean-Marc Boivin, 38, French mountaineer, extreme sports person, film maker, and author, BASE jumping accident.
- Brendan Corish, 71, Irish politician.
- Larry Cox, 42, American baseball player, heart attack.
- Hap Day, 88, Canadian ice hockey player (Toronto Maple Leafs).
- Dino Falconi, 87, Italian screenwriter and film director.
- Erik Rhodes, 84, American actor, pneumonia.
- Allen Rivkin, 86, American screenwriter.
- Hans Speier, 85, German-American sociologist.

=== 18 ===
- Günther Bornkamm, 84, German theologian.
- Herman Carlson, 83, Swedish Olympic ice hockey player (1936).
- Margaret Craske, 97, British ballet dancer and choreographer.
- Richard de Zoysa, 31, Sri Lankan journalist, human rights activist and actor, shot.
- Joe Erskine, 56, Welsh boxer.
- Tor Isedal, 65, Swedish actor.
- Frank Ross, 85, American filmmaker, complications from brain surgery.

=== 19 ===
- Edris Rice-Wray Carson, 86, American medical researcher.
- Ernest Cole, 49, South African photographer, cancer.
- Eddie Cudworth, 79, Canadian Olympic long-distance runner (1932).
- Gabriel Katzka, 59, American theater, film and television producer, heart attack.
- Francis Keppel, 73, American educator.
- Laura Spencer-Churchill, Duchess of Marlborough, 74, British socialite.
- Otto E. Neugebauer, 90, Austrian-American mathematician and science historian.
- Janusz Paluszkiewicz, 77, Polish actor.
- Michael Powell, 84, English filmmaker, cancer.
- Abdul Matin Chowdhury, Shaikh-e-Fulbari, 74–75, Bangladeshi religious scholar.
- Massey H. Shepherd, 76, American priest and scholar.
- William White, 69, Scottish cricketer. field hockey player and Olympic silver medalist (1948).

=== 20 ===
- Sergio Camargo, 59, Brazilian sculptor and relief maker.
- Cecil Garriott, 73, American baseball player (Chicago Cubs).
- Harry Klinefelter, 77, American physician.
- Verdina Shlonsky, 85, Russian-Israeli musician.
- Nicolae Talpoş, 28, Romanian Olympic boxer (1984).
- Gerry Tuite, 80, Australian rules footballer.

=== 21 ===
- Zohrabai Ambalewali, 71–72, Indian singer.
- Johnny Borland, 64, New Zealand athletics official.
- Juanita Larrauri, 79, Argentine singer and politician.
- Isaac Jacob Schoenberg, 86, Romanian-American mathematician.
- Vincent Teresa, 59–60, American mobster (Patriarca crime family), kidney failure.

=== 22 ===
- Stephen W. Burns, 35, American actor, AIDS.
- T. O. Honiball, 85, South African cartoonist.
- Andrew Jarvis, 99, Greek-American politician and businessman.
- Victor Lasky, 72, American writer.
- Evald Seepere, 78, Estonian Olympic boxer (1936).

=== 23 ===
- Amritlal, 73, Indian writer.
- Arne Bang-Hansen, 78, Norwegian actor.
- José Napoleón Duarte, 64, Salvadoran politician, president (1984–1989), stomach cancer.
- James M. Gavin, 82, American general.
- Stan Hough, 71, American film producer.
- Haq Nawaz Jhangvi, 37–38, Pakistani cleric, murdered.
- David Samoylov, 69, Russian poet.
- Annelien Kappeyne van de Coppello, 53, Dutch politician, cancer.

=== 24 ===
- Arthur Ayrault, 55, American Olympic rower (1956, 1960).
- Tony Conigliaro, 45, American baseball player (Boston Red Sox, California Angels), kidney failure.
- Malcolm Forbes, 70, American politician and publisher (Forbes), heart attack.
- Lloyd Jordan, 89, American sports player and coach.
- Jure Kaštelan, 70, Yugoslav poet.
- Arch Nicholson, 48, Australian film director, amyotrophic lateral sclerosis.
- Sandro Pertini, 93, Italian politician, president (1978–1985).
- Johnnie Ray, 63, American singer ("Cry"), liver failure.
- Gabriel Sempé, 88, French Olympic hurdler (1924, 1928).
- Darryl Usher, 25, American football player (New England Patriots, San Diego Chargers, Phoenix Cardinals), shot.

=== 25 ===
- André de Korver, 74, Dutch racing cyclist.
- Henry Fairlie, 66, British political journalist.
- Estelle Peck Ishigo, 90, American artist and author.
- Ingrid Larsen, 80, Danish chess player.
- Carmine Tucci, 56, Italian Olympic ice hockey player (1956).

=== 26 ===
- Gilbert Casalecchi, 81, Swiss Olympic sailor (1960).
- Lew Erber, 55, American gridiron football coach (Oakland Raiders, New England Patriots).
- Julian Gascoigne, 86, British general.
- Cornell Gunter, 53, American singer, shot.
- Márvio dos Santos, 55, Brazilian Olympic water polo player (1952, 1960, 1964).
- Iphigene Ochs Sulzberger, 97, American heiress and publisher (The New York Times).
- Margot Walle, 68, Norwegian Olympic skater (1948).
- Wu Zhong, 68, Chinese general, car accident.

=== 27 ===
- Les Ames, 84, English cricket player.
- Johannes Draaijer, 26, Dutch racing driver, heart block, heart attack.
- Vern Freiburger, 66, American baseball player (Cleveland Indians).
- Alberto Mario Giustolisi, 61, Italian chess player.
- Nahum Norbert Glatzer, 86, Austrian-American historian and philosopher.
- Josephine Johnson, 79, American novelist, pneumonia.
- Nguyễn Phúc Bửu Lộc, 75, Vietnamese politician, prime minister (1954).
- Charlie McKinley, 86, Australian rules footballer.
- Alexandru Rosetti, 94, Romanian linguist, accident.
- Eric Sörensen, 76, Swedish Olympic equestrian (1948).
- Jesse Williams, 76, American baseball player.

=== 28 ===
- Erik Anderberg, 98, Swedish naval admiral.
- Bob Armstrong, 81, American NFL player (Portsmouth Spartans).
- Jack Conroy, 90, American leftist writer.
- Mario Craveri, 87, Italian filmmaker.
- Sylvia del Villard, 62, Puerto Rican actress and dancer.
- Fabia Drake, 86, British actress.
- Kornel Filipowicz, 76, Polish writer, lung cancer.
- Russell Jacquet, 72, American trumpeter, heart attack.
- Colin Milburn, 48, English cricketer, heart attack.
- Wallace Reid Jr., 72, American actor, plane crash.
- John O'Sullivan, 88, Irish politician.
- Tuppy Owen-Smith, 81, South African cricket player.
- Greville Wynne, 70, British engineer and intelligence officer, esophageal cancer.
