= Sailing at the 1960 Summer Olympics – Dragon =

Dragon at the Games of the XVII Olympiad
- Medalists
- Venue: Naples
- Competitors: 81 from 27 nations
- Teams: 27

Medalists
1st place, gold medalist(s)		Crown Prince Constantine; Odysseus Eskitzoglou; Georgios Zaimis	Greece
2nd place, silver medalist(s)		Jorge Salas Chávez; Héctor Calegaris; Jorge del Río Sálas	Argentina
3rd place, bronze medalist(s)		Antonio Cosentino; Antonio Ciciliano; Giulio De Stefano	Italy

The Dragon was a sailing event on the 1960 Summer Olympics sailing program in Naples. Seven races were scheduled. Eighty-one sailors, on 27 boats, from 27 nations competed.

== Results ==
Results of individual races
Pos	Sail no.	Boat name	Crew	Country	I		II		III		IV		V		VI		VII		Tot	Pts
Pos	Sail no.	Boat name	Crew	Country	Pos	Pts	Pos	Pts	Pos	Pts	Pos	Pts	Pos	Pts	Pos	Pts	Pos	Pts	Tot	Pts
Gold medal	GE–3	Nirefs	Crown Prince Constantine; Odysseus Eskitzoglou; Georgios Zaimis	Greece	10	532^{†}	3	1055	3	1055	1	1532	4	930	2	1231	4	930	7265	6733
Silver medal	A–34	Tango	Jorge Salas Chávez; Héctor Calegaris; Jorge del Río Salas	Argentina	15	356	1	1532	2	1231	5	833	2	1231	DSQ	0^{†}	10	532	5715	5715
Bronze medal	I–19	Venilia	Antonio Cosentino; Antonio Ciciliano; Giulio De Stefano	Italy	5	833	2	1231	1	1532	2	1231	11	491	14	386	DSQ	0^{†}	5704	5704
4	N–228	Lett	Øivind Christensen; Arild E. Amundsen; Otto Svae Carl	Norway	19	254^{†}	7	687	11	491	16	328	5	833	1	1532	1	1532	5657	5403
5	KC–52	Argo II	Sandy MacDonald; Lynn Watters; Gordon Norton	Canada	1	1532	4	930	9	578	4	930	6	754	12	453	18	277^{†}	5454	5177
6	D–144	Chok	Aage Birch; Paul L. Jørgensen; Niels P. Markussen	Denmark	2	1231	DSQ	0^{†}	13	418	11	491	3	1055	5	833	7	687	4715	4715
7	K–305	Salamander	Graham Mann; Jonathan Janson; Ian Hannay	Great Britain	4	930	14	386^{†}	15	356	7	687	1	1532	9	578	11	491	4960	4604
8	G–184	Dinah V	Hans Ravenborg; Günther Benecke; Peter Rebien	United Team of Germany	13	418	8	629	21	210^{†}	13	418	9	578	3	1055	2	1231	4539	4329
9	P–18	Grifo III	Carlos Ferreira; Gonçalo Mello; Joaquim Basto	Portugal	17	302^{†}	11	491	10	532	3	1055	14	386	10	532	3	1055	4353	4051
10	US–143	Spirit VI	Eugene H. Walet; Allen McClure; Claude Kohler	United States	7	687	6	754	14	386	10	532	17	302^{†}	4	930	12	453	4044	3742
11	KA–48	Gabbiano	Harold Brooke; John Coon; Alan Cain	Australia	8	629	10	532	8	629	6	754	15	356	19	254^{†}	5	833	3987	3733
12	IR–1	Aletta	Arthur J. Mooney; Robin Benson; David Ryder	Ireland	11	491	18	277^{†}	5	833	9	578	13	418	7	687	8	629	3913	3636
13	H–161	Trintel II	Wim van Duyl; Biem Dudok van Heel; Jacq van den Berg	Netherlands	9	578	9	578	4	930	12	453	10	532	11	491	DNF	101^{†}	3663	3562
14	F–137	Astrid III	Jean Peytel; François Thierry-Mieg; Philippe Reinhart	France	3	1055	13	418	16	328	19	254^{†}	19	254	8	629	6	754	3692	3438
15	KB–2	Oleander II	Howard B. Eve; James W. Kempe; Richard Masters	Bermuda	25	134^{†}	5	833	7	687	14	386	16	328	16	328	14	386	3082	2948
16	SR–316	Persey	Eduard Stayson; Vyacheslav Mozhayev; Nikolay Yepifanov	Soviet Union	6	754	15	356	20	231	8	629	22	190^{†}	15	356	9	578	3094	2904
17	L–33	Rififi	René Nyman; Lasse Dahlman; Heinrich Schaarschmidt	Finland	22	190^{†}	19	254	18	277	18	277	7	687	6	754	13	418	2857	2667
18	BA–1	Bim	Godfrey Kelly; Maurice Kelly; Percy Knowles	Bahamas	18	277	21	210^{†}	17	302	17	302	8	629	13	418	20	231	2369	2159
19	U–l	Bajazzo	Horacio García; Víctor Trinchín; Gonzalo García	Uruguay	16	328	17	302	6	754	22	190	21	210	24	152^{†}	16	328	2264	2112
20	S–194	Galejan	Bengt Palmquist; Göran Crafoord; Sten Elliot	Sweden	12	453	12	453	19	254	15	356	20	231^{†}	20	231	15	356	2334	2103
21	Z–30	Baccara	Robert Thorens; Gilbert Casalecchi; Pierre Camoletti	Switzerland	23	171^{†}	20	231	12	453	21	210	23	171	17	302	17	302	1840	1669
22	J–11	Boreas	Masayuki Ishii; Yutaka Okamoto; Setsuo Kawada	Japan	21	210	16	328	22	190	24	152^{†}	12	453	21	210	19	254	1797	1645
23	MD–7	Damoiselle IV	Jules Soccal; Gérard Battaglia; Jean-Pierre Crovetto	Monaco	14	386	22	190	24	152^{†}	23	171	24	152	22	190	22	190	1431	1279
24	PH–10	Patricia	Fausto Preysler; Jesús Villareal; Francisco Gonzales	Philippines	20	231	25	134	23	171	20	231	18	277	23	171	DNS	0^{†}	1215	1215
25	KS–319	June climene	Edward G. Holiday; James Cooke; Thomas Durcan	Singapore	24	152	24	152	25	134	26	117^{†}	25	134	18	277	21	210	1176	1059
26	RI–3	Partenope	Ashari Danudirdjo; Eri Sudewo; Josef Muskita	Indonesia	27	101^{†}	23	171	26	117	27	101	27	101	25	134	23	171	896	795
27	E–16	Canopus	Santiago Pi; Juan Mirangels; José Pi	Spain	26	117	26	117	27	101	25	134	26	117	26	117	DNF	101^{†}	804	703

Legend: DNF – Did not finish; DNS – Did not start; DSQ – Disqualified; † – Discarded race not counted in the overall result;
Gender: – male; – female;

=== Daily standings ===
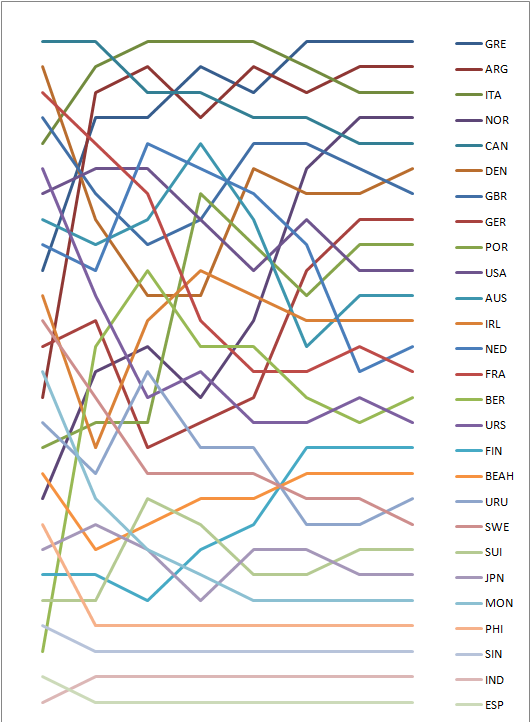
Graph showing the daily standings in the Dragon during the 1960 Summer Olympics

== Conditions at Naples ==
Of the total of three race areas were needed during the Olympics in Naples. Each of the classes was using the same scoring system. The southern course was used for the Dragon.

Date	Race	Sea	Wind direction	Wind speed (m/s)
29 August 1960	I	Calm	SSW	4-5
30 August 1960	II	Calm	SW	3
31 August 1960	III	Slightly rough	W	6-8
1 September 1960	IV	Calm	SSW	3
5 September 1960	V	Calm	SSW	4-5
6 September 1960	VI	Sea force two	WSW	7-8
7 September 1960	VII	Sea force 1	W	2-3
