= Deaths in April 1991 =

The following is a list of notable deaths in April 1991.

Entries for each day are listed alphabetically by surname. A typical entry lists information in the following sequence:

- Name, age, country of citizenship at birth, subsequent country of citizenship (if applicable), reason for notability, cause of death (if known), and reference.

== April 1991 ==
=== 1 ===
- Angus Cameron, 61, Scottish rugby player.
- Jon Eardley, 62, American trumpeter.
- Martha Graham, 96, American dancer and choreographer, pneumonia.
- Frankie Gustine, 71, American baseball player (Pittsburgh Pirates, Chicago Cubs, St. Louis Browns).
- Jaime Guzmán, 44, Chilean politician, shot.
- George Lee, 71, English footballer.
- Eddie Miller, 79, American jazz musician, pneumonia.
- Paulo Muwanga, 66, Ugandan politician, president (1980).
- Bjarne Nerem, 67, Norwegian jazz musician.
- Detlev Karsten Rohwedder, 58, German politician, shot.
- Rina Zelyonaya, 89, Soviet actress, singer and comedian, cancer.

=== 2 ===
- Bernard Fensterwald, 69, American lawyer who defended James Earl Ray and James W. McCord Jr.
- Noel George Butlin, 69, Australian economic historian.
- Gisa Geert, 90, Austrian actress and choreographer.
- Ken Gunning, 76, American basketball player.
- Erzsébet Ruda, 86, Hungarian Olympic discus thrower (1928).
- Cheng Shewo, 92, Chinese journalist, publisher, and educator.
- Robert Veyron-Lacroix, 68, French harpsichordist and pianist.

=== 3 ===
- P. K. Balakrishnan, 66, Indian novelist.
- Fred Capossela, 88, American horse racing announcer, stroke.
- Charles Goren, 90, American bridge player.
- Graham Greene, 86, English writer, leukemia.
- Whitey Miller, 75, American baseball player (New York Giants).
- John Mullen, 66, American Major League Baseball executive.
- Coral Lansbury, 61, Australian writer, bowel cancer.
- Alan Stewart Orr, 80, British barrister.
- Jo Teunissen-Waalboer, 71, Dutch Olympic javelin thrower (1948).

=== 4 ===
- Edmund Adamkiewicz, 70, German football player.
- Max Frisch, 79, Swiss playwright and novelist, colorectal cancer.
- John Heinz, 52, American politician, member of the U.S. House of Representatives (1971–1977) and Senate (since 1977), plane crash.
- Graham Ingels, 75, American comic artist.
- Louiguy, 75, Spanish-born French composer.
- Johnny Moore, 89, American baseball player (Chicago Cubs, Cincinnati Reds, Philadelphia Phillies).
- The Thinker, 12, British thoroughbred racehorse, euthanized.

=== 5 ===
- Nona Balakian, 72, American literary critic and an editor.
- Gerald Blake, 62, British television director.
- Sonny Carter, 43, American astronaut, plane crash.
- William Sidney, 1st Viscount De L'Isle, 81, English-Australian politician, Governor-General of Australia (1961–1965).
- Eve Garnett, 91, English writer.
- Maurice Hallé, 85, Canadian politician, member of the House of Commons of Canada (1940–1949).
- Alf Horn, 78, Canadian Olympic fencer (1948).
- Kōzō Masuda, 73, Japanese professional shogi player.
- Jaroslav Mikoška, 57, Czech Olympic gymnast (1956).
- Jiří Mucha, 76, Czechoslovak journalist, cancer.
- Albert Secrétant, 85, French Olympic cross-country skier (1932).
- John Tower, 65, American politician, member of the U.S. Senate (1961–1985), plane crash.
- Renato Turi, 70, Italian actor and voice actor.

=== 6 ===
- Ed Craney, 86, American radio executive.
- Dennis Cross, 66, American actor, cancer.
- Louis Joxe, 89, French politician.
- Joaquín Nogueras Márquez, 84, Spanish Olympic equestrian (1948, 1952, 1956).
- Earl Nolan, 80, American football player (Chicago Cardinals).
- Bill Ponsford, 90, Australian cricketer.

=== 7 ===
- Cora Du Bois, 87, American anthropologist, pneumonia.
- Henry Glover, 69, American songwriter, heart attack.
- Véra Nabokov, 89, Soviet-Swiss translator.
- Ruth Page, 92, American ballerina.

=== 8 ===
- Dink Carroll, 91, Canadian sports journalist.
- Pierre Grégoire, 83, Luxembourgish politician.
- Haim Hanani, 78, Polish-Israeli mathematician.
- Max Janowski, 78-79, German-American composer.
- Per "Dead" Ohlin, 22, Swedish black metal musician (Mayhem), suicide by gunshot.
- Kristian Osvald Viderø, 84, Faroese clergyman and translator.
- Tilo Freiherr von Berlepsch, 77, German actor.

=== 9 ===
- Maurice Binder, 72, American film title designer (James Bond), lung cancer.
- Norris Bowden, 64, Canadian Olympic figure skater (1952, 1956).
- Antoine Dignef, 80, Belgian cyclist.
- William Mims, 64, American actor, cardiac arrest.
- Forrest Towns, 77, American track and field athlete and Olympian (1936), heart attack.

=== 10 ===
- Otto Berg, 84, Norwegian Olympic long jumper (1936).
- Kevin Peter Hall, 35, American actor (Predator, Harry and the Hendersons, 227), AIDS.
- Sammy Holbrook, 80, American baseball player (Washington Senators).
- Marian Kaiser, 58, Polish speedway rider.
- Natalie Schafer, 90, American actress (Gilligan's Island), liver cancer.
- Paul Stader, 80, American actor and stuntman (The Towering Inferno, The Goonies, The Poseidon Adventure).
- Wu Yin, 81, Chinese actress.

=== 11 ===
- Chester Anderson, 58, American underground press poet and editor.
- Fredson Bowers, 85, American bibliographer.
- Walker Cooper, 76, American baseball player.
- Doris de Jong, 89, Dutch Olympic fencer (1928, 1932).
- Bruno Hoffmann, 77, German glass harpist.
- Mikine Kuwahara, 95, Japanese politician.
- Dick Manning, 78, Russian-American songwriter.
- Bernard Taylor, Baron Taylor of Mansfield, 95, British politician.

=== 12 ===
- Rod Leffanue, 78, Australian rules footballer.
- Gene Lillard, 77, American baseball player (Chicago Cubs, St. Louis Cardinals).
- Tom Rosqui, 62, American actor (The Godfather Part II), cancer.
- James Schuyler, 67, American poet, stroke.
- Harold Thomsett, 77, Australian cricketer.
- Orville Vogel, 83, American scientist and wheat biologist, cancer.
- Ivar Waller, 92, Swedish theoretical physicist.

=== 13 ===
- Bobby Boriello, 47, American mobster (Gambino crime family), shot.
- Serge David, 58, French racing cyclist.
- Wilhelm Lanzky-Otto, 82, Danish horn player.
- Kalevi Laurila, 53, Finnish Olympic skier (1964, 1968).
- Leo Rodak, 77, American featherweight boxer.

=== 14 ===
- Dhalia, 66, Indonesian actress, cancer.
- Randolfo Pacciardi, 92, Italian politician.
- Lionello Levi Sandri, 80, Italian politician.
- Yosef Tekoah, 66, Polish-Israeli diplomat, heart attack.

=== 15 ===
- Francisco Herrera Luque, 63, Venezuelan writer, psychiatrist and diplomat.
- Dante Milano, 91, Brazilian poet.
- Teddy Petersen, 98, Danish violinist.
- George Withers, 74, Australian rules footballer.
- Erich Zander, 86, German Olympic field hockey player (1928, 1936).

=== 16 ===
- Qin Benli, 72, Chinese journalist, stomach cancer.
- Patrick Bergin, 78, Irish politician and trade union official.
- Homer Bigart, 83, American journalist, cancer.
- John V. Breakwell, 74, American control theorist.
- Bob Dill, 70, American ice hockey player (New York Rangers).
- Roman Jasinski, 84, Polish ballet dancer.
- Sir David Lean, 83, English film director (Lawrence of Arabia, Doctor Zhivago, The Bridge on the River Kwai), Oscar winner (1958, 1963), esophageal cancer.
- Rafton Pounder, 57, Northern Irish unionist politician.
- Al Verdel, 69, American baseball player (Philadelphia Phillies).

=== 17 ===
- Henry Crouch, 77, English cricketer.
- Giovanni Malagodi, 86, Italian politician.
- Michael Long, 43, Australian actor, lung cancer.
- Les Mallon, 85, American baseball player (Philadelphia Phillies, Boston Braves).
- Michael Pertwee, 74, English screenwriter.
- Tadeusz Pietrzykowski, 74, Polish boxer and Holocaust survivor.
- Jack Yellen, 98, Polish-American lyricist ("Happy Days Are Here Again").

=== 18 ===
- Ron Bottcher, 50, American opera singer, AIDS.
- Margret Buscher, 53, German Olympic sprinter (1964).
- Gabriel Celaya, 80, Spanish poet.
- Thomas Arthur Connolly, 91, American Roman Catholic prelate.
- Martin Hannett, 42, English record producer, heart failure.
- John Morse Haydon, 71, American politician.
- Austin Bradford Hill, 93, English epidemiologist.
- Sheldon Jones, 69, American baseball player (New York Giants, Boston Braves, Chicago Cubs).
- Menios Koutsogiorgas, 68-69, Greek politician.
- Barry Rogers, 55, American trombonist.

=== 19 ===
- Dilara Aliyeva, 61, Soviet philologist and translator, traffic collision.
- Leon Foster, 77, Barbadian cricket player.
- Judy Gunn, 76, British actress.
- Stanley Hawes, 86, British-Australian filmmaker.
- Louise Dickinson Rich, 87, American writer.

=== 20 ===
- Hiroyuki Ebihara, 51, Japanese boxer.
- Seán Ó Faoláin, 91, Irish writer.
- Anton Kotzig, 71, Czechoslovak-Canadian mathematician.
- Steve Marriott, 44, English musician (Small Faces, Humble Pie), house fire.
- Emmanuel Kiwanuka Nsubuga, 76, Ugandan Roman Catholic cardinal.
- Don Siegel, 78, American film director (Dirty Harry, Invasion of the Body Snatchers, Escape from Alcatraz), cancer.
- Yumjaagiin Tsedenbal, 74, Mongolian politician, bile duct cancer.
- Bucky Walters, 82, American baseball player.

=== 21 ===
- Richard Walker Bolling, 74, American politician, member of the U.S. House of Representatives (1949–1983).
- Willi Boskovsky, 81, Austrian violinist.
- Li Choh-ming, 79, Chinese-American economist and educator.
- Bernard Laidebeur, 48, French Olympic runner (1964).
- Alexey Vodyagin, 66, Soviet footballer.
- Dick Weik, 63, American baseball player (Washington Senators, Cleveland Indians, Detroit Tigers).

=== 22 ===
- Jack Kid Berg, 81, English boxer.
- Andrew Boyle, 71, Scottish journalist and biographer.
- Anne Howard, 66, American actress, cerebral hemorrhage.
- Karl Klasen, 81, German banker.
- Mikheil Meskhi, 54, Georgian football player.
- Sylvio Pirillo, 74, Brazilian footballer.
- Bob Shaddock, 70, American basketball player (Syracuse Nationals).
- Jason Richard Swallen, 87, American botanist.
- Feriha Tevfik, 80-81, Turkish actress, cerebral hemorrhage.

=== 23 ===
- Peter Brenchley, 54, Australian rules footballer.
- Paul Brickhill, 74, Australian author (The Great Escape, The Dam Busters).
- Arthur Derounian, 82, Turkish-American journalist, heart attack.
- William Dozier, 83, American film and television producer (Batman, The Green Hornet, Rod Brown of the Rocket Rangers), stroke.
- Lokman Hossain Fakir, 56, Bangladeshi musician.
- Harold Lang, 85, Australian cricketer.
- Joseph Simon Lord III, 78, American district judge (United States District Court for the Eastern District of Pennsylvania).
- Johnny Thunders, 38, American musician, drug overdose.

=== 24 ===
- Mario Acchini, 75, Italian Olympic rower (1948).
- Werner Neumann, 86, German musicologist.
- Haakon Tranberg, 74, Norwegian sprinter.
- Cafer Çağatay, 91-92, Turkish Olympic footballer (1924).

=== 25 ===
- Lamberto V. Avellana, 76, Filipino film director.
- Laz Barrera, 66, Cuban-American racehorse trainer.
- Carl Brandt, 76, American composer.
- Bob DeWeese, 75, American basketball player.
- Michael Kühnen, 35, German neo-Nazi leader, AIDS.
- Theo Laseroms, 51, Dutch football player, heart attack.
- Antônio de Castro Mayer, 86, Brazilian Roman Catholic prelate, respiratory failure.

=== 26 ===
- Nate Andrews, 77, American baseball player.
- Leo Arnaud, 86, French-American composer.
- Gordon Chalk, 77, Australian politician.
- Carmine Coppola, 80, American film composer (The Godfather, Apocalypse Now, The Outsiders), Oscar winner (1975), stroke.
- Marie-Thérèse d'Alverny, 88, French historian.
- A. B. Guthrie Jr., 90, American author.
- Lars Hall, 63, Swedish Olympic pentathlete (1952, 1956).
- Richard Hatfield, 60, Canadian politician, brain cancer.
- Henry Lipson, 81, British physicist, heart attack.
- Ezio Marano, 63, Italian actor.
- Emily McLaughlin, 62, American actress (General Hospital), cancer.
- William Andrew Paton, 101, American accountancy scholar.
- Walter Reder, 76, Austrian war criminal (Marzabotto massacre).
- Thaddeus Anthony Shubsda, 66, American prelate of the Catholic Church.

=== 27 ===
- Georg Ehnes, 70, German politician.
- Alfred Eriksen, 72, Norwegian Olympic fencer (1948, 1952).
- Juan Mirangels, 74, Spanish Olympic sailor (1960).
- Pavlos Oikonomou-Gouras, 93, Greek diplomat.
- Joe Urso, 74, American basketball player.
- Robert Velter, 82, French cartoonist (Spirou & Fantasio).
- Elinor Remick Warren, 91, American composer.

=== 28 ===
- Steve Broidy, 85, American film executive, heart attack.
- Ricardo Cardoso, 27, Brazilian Olympic judoka (1988).
- Ken Curtis, 74, American actor (Gunsmoke, The Searchers, Robin Hood) and singer, heart attack.
- Jean Goujon, 77, French racing cyclist and Olympian (1936).
- Albrecht Joseph, 89, German playwright, screenwriter and film editor.
- Nicola Manzari, 82, Italian filmmaker.
- Floyd McKissick, 69, American lawyer and civil rights activist, lung cancer.
- Tommy Paul, 82, American boxer.
- Pushpavalli, 65, Indian actress, diabetes.
- Igal Roodenko, 74, American pacifist and civil rights activist.
- Harry Sorensen, 77, American basketball player.
- Ollie Spencer, 60, American football player (Detroit Lions, Green Bay Packers, Oakland Raiders), heart attack.
- Stan Turner, 64, English football player.
- Willy von Känel, 81, Swiss football player.

=== 29 ===
- Claude Gallimard, 77, French publisher.
- Gonzaguinha, 45, Brazilian singer, traffic collision.
- Joyce Ballou Gregorian, 44, American writer and horse breeder, cancer.
- Jackie Searl, 69, American actor.

=== 30 ===
- Simon Achikgyozyan, 52, Soviet Armenian soldier and war hero, killed in battle.
- André Badonnel, 92, French entomologist.
- Ghislaine Dommanget, 90, French-Monegasque royal and actress, princess consort (1946–1949).
- Tatul Krpeyan, 26, Soviet Armenian soldier and war hero, shot.
- Juozas Urbšys, 95, Lithuanian diplomat.
