= 1991 in film =

The year 1991 in film involved numerous significant events. Important films released this year included The Silence of the Lambs, Beauty and the Beast, Thelma & Louise, JFK and Terminator 2: Judgment Day.

== Highest-grossing films ==
The top 10 films released in 1991 by worldwide gross are as follows:

Highest-grossing films of 1991
Rank	Title	Distributor	Worldwide gross
1	Terminator 2: Judgment Day	TriStar	$520,881,154
2	Robin Hood: Prince of Thieves	Warner Bros.	$390,493,908
3	Beauty and the Beast	Buena Vista	$346,317,207
4	Hook	TriStar	$300,854,984
5	The Silence of the Lambs	Orion	$272,742,922
6	JFK	Warner Bros.	$205,405,498
7	The Naked Gun 2½: The Smell of Fear	Paramount	$192,230,411
8	The Addams Family	Paramount / Orion	$191,502,426
9	Cape Fear	Universal	$182,291,969
10	Hot Shots!	20th Century Fox	$181,096,164

== Events ==
- February 14 – The Silence of the Lambs is released and becomes only the third film after It Happened One Night (1934) and One Flew Over the Cuckoo's Nest (1975) to win the top five categories at the Academy Awards: Best Picture; Best Director (Jonathan Demme); Best Actor (Anthony Hopkins); Best Actress (Jodie Foster); and Best Adapted Screenplay (Ted Tally). It is also the first, and to date only, Best Picture winner widely considered to be a horror film.
- March 20 – Frank Mancuso Sr. leaves as the head of Paramount Pictures.
- July 1 – Brandon Tartikoff is appointed as chairman of Paramount Pictures.
- July 3 – Terminator 2: Judgment Day becomes one of the landmarks for science fiction action films with its groundbreaking visual effects from Industrial Light & Magic.
- August 7 – Sony Pictures Entertainment is formed, acquiring Columbia Pictures Industries. As a result of this new formation, Tri-Star Pictures drops the hyphen from its name and becomes TriStar Pictures, while RCA/Columbia Pictures Home Video becomes Columbia-TriStar Home Video.
- October – Mark Canton replaces Frank Price as chairman of Columbia Pictures.
- November 22 – Walt Disney Pictures releases Beauty and the Beast, based on the original fairy tale and Jean Cocteau's 1946 film. The film becomes one of the most prestigious and greatest animated and romantic films in cinema history. It goes on to become the first animated film ever nominated for the Academy Award for Best Picture.

== Awards ==
Academy Awards

Golden Globe Awards

Palme d'Or (Cannes Film Festival):

Barton Fink, directed by Joel and Ethan Coen, United States

Golden Lion (Venice Film Festival):

Close to Eden (Urga), directed by Nikita Mikhalkov, France / USSR

Golden Bear (Berlin Film Festival):

La Casa del sorriso (The House of Smiles), directed by Marco Ferreri, Italy

People's Choice Award (Toronto International Film Festival):

The Fisher King, directed by Terry Gilliam, United States

Category/Organization	49th Golden Globe Awards January 18, 1992		45th BAFTA Awards February 21, 1992	64th Academy Awards March 30, 1992
Category/Organization	Drama	Musical or Comedy	45th BAFTA Awards February 21, 1992	64th Academy Awards March 30, 1992
Best Film	Bugsy	Beauty and the Beast	The Commitments	The Silence of the Lambs
Best Director	Oliver Stone; JFK		Alan Parker; The Commitments	Jonathan Demme; The Silence of the Lambs
Best Actor	Nick Nolte; The Prince of Tides	Robin Williams; The Fisher King	Anthony Hopkins; The Silence of the Lambs	
Best Actress	Jodie Foster; The Silence of the Lambs	Bette Midler; For the Boys	Jodie Foster; The Silence of the Lambs	
Best Supporting Actor	Jack Palance; City Slickers		Alan Rickman; Robin Hood: Prince of Thieves	Jack Palance; City Slickers
Best Supporting Actress	Mercedes Ruehl; The Fisher King		Kate Nelligan; Frankie and Johnny	Mercedes Ruehl; The Fisher King
Best Screenplay, Adapted	Thelma & Louise; Callie Khouri		The Commitments; Dick Clement	The Silence of the Lambs; Ted Tally
Best Screenplay, Original	Thelma & Louise; Callie Khouri		Truly, Madly, Deeply; Anthony Minghella	Thelma & Louise; Callie Khouri
Best Original Score	Beauty and the Beast; Alan Menken		Cyrano de Bergerac; Jean-Claude Petit	Beauty and the Beast; Alan Menken
Best Original Song	"Beauty and the Beast"; Beauty and the Beast			"Beauty and the Beast"; Beauty and the Beast
Best Foreign Language Film	Europa Europa (Hitlerjunge Salomon)		The Nasty Girl (Das schreckliche Mädchen)	Mediterraneo

== 1991 films ==
=== By country/region ===
- List of American films of 1991
- List of Argentine films of 1991
- List of Australian films of 1991
- List of Bangladeshi films of 1991
- List of British films of 1991
- List of Canadian films of 1991
- List of French films of 1991
- List of Hong Kong films of 1991
- List of Indian films of 1991
  - List of Hindi films of 1991
  - List of Kannada films of 1991
  - List of Malayalam films of 1991
  - List of Marathi films of 1991
  - List of Tamil films of 1991
  - List of Telugu films of 1991
- List of Japanese films of 1991
- List of Mexican films of 1991
- List of Pakistani films of 1991
- List of South Korean films of 1991
- List of Soviet films of 1991
- List of Spanish films of 1991

=== By genre/medium ===
- List of action films of 1991
- List of animated feature films of 1991
- List of avant-garde films of 1991
- List of crime films of 1991
- List of comedy films of 1991
- List of drama films of 1991
- List of horror films of 1991
- List of science fiction films of 1991
- List of thriller films of 1991
- List of western films of 1991

== Births ==
- January 1 – Mark L. Young, American actor
- January 2 – Ben Hardy, English actor
- January 4 – Charles Melton, American actor and model
- January 7 – Michaela Jaé Rodriguez, American actress and singer
- January 9 – Laura-Leigh, American actress
- January 13
  - Genevieve Gaunt, English actress
  - Jennifer Paredes, American actress
- January 14 – Jeanine Mason, American actress
- January 15
  - Ayeza Khan, Pakistani actress and model
  - Lulu Popplewell, English comedian and actress
- January 17 – Willa Fitzgerald, American actress
- January 18 – Britt McKillip, Canadian actress, singer
- January 19 – Erin Sanders, American actress
- January 21
  - Craig Roberts, Welsh actor and director
  - Brittany Tiplady, Canadian actress
- January 24 – Pablo Pauly, French actor
- January 25
  - Ariana DeBose, American actress, dancer and singer
- January 27 – Cristo Fernández, Mexican actor
- January 28 – Calum Worthy, Canadian actor, musician
- February 10 – Emma Roberts, American actress
- February 12 – Tanaya Beatty, Canadian actress
- February 17
  - Ed Sheeran, English singer-songwriter
  - Bonnie Wright, English actress
  - Jeremy Allen White, American actor
- February 18
  - Esther Garrel, French actress
  - Malese Jow, American actress
- February 21
  - Joe Alwyn, English actor
  - Rose Reynolds, British actress and singer
- February 24 – O'Shea Jackson Jr., American actor and rapper
- February 25 – Tony Oller, American singer, songwriter and actor
- February 26 – Lex Scott Davis, American actress
- February 28
  - Sarah Bolger, Irish actress
  - Rudy Mancuso, American internet personality, musician and actor
- March 2 – Jake Picking, German-born American actor
- March 5 – Hanna Mangan-Lawrence, English-Australian actress
- March 6 – Tyler, The Creator, American rapper
- March 7 – Daisy Head, English actress
- March 8 – Devon Werkheiser, American actor
- March 9 – Domo Genesis, American rapper
- March 12 – Lauren Holt, American actress, comedian and singer
- March 17 – Kristjan Lüüs, Estonian actor
- March 19 – Garrett Clayton, American actor
- March 22 – Dominique Fishback, American actress
- March 23 – Madelyn Deutch, American actress, director, musician and writer
- March 24 – Jack Bannon, English actor
- March 25 – Seychelle Gabriel, American actress
- March 28 – Amy Bruckner, American actress
- March 29
  - Irene, South Korean singer, rapper and actress
  - Samantha Win, Canadian actress
- March 31 – Elliot Barnes-Worrell, English actor
- April 4 – Jamie Lynn Spears, American actress
- April 7 – Anne-Marie, English singer-songwriter and actress
- April 8 - Constance Lau, Singaporean actress
- April 9 – Amber Lee Connors, American voice actress
- April 10
  - AJ Michalka, American singer and actress
  - Sergiusz Żymełka, Polish actor
- April 13 – Dylan Penn, American actress and model
- April 19 – Mehazabien Chowdhury, Bangladeshi actress and model
- April 21 – Frank Dillane, English actor
- April 22 – Leonie Benesch, German actor
- April 27 – Darren Barnet, American actor
- May 6
  - Shamier Anderson, Canadian actor
  - Freddie Boath, English actor
- May 17 – Daniel Curtis Lee, American actor, comedian and rapper
- May 21 – Sarah Ramos, American actress
- June 1 – Zazie Beetz, American actress
- June 7 – Emily Ratajkowski, English-born American actress and model
- June 11 – Kärt Tammjärv, Estonian actress
- June 15 – Lindsay Seidel, American voice actress
- June 18 – Willa Holland, American actress
- June 20
  - Samson Kayo, British actor, comedian, producer and writer
  - Ruby Modine, American actress and singer
- June 24 – Dexter Darden, American actor
- June 26 – Will Attenborough, British actor
- June 28 – Daniel Zovatto, Costa Rican-American actor
- June 29
  - Tajja Isen, Canadian actress and singer-songwriter
  - Addison Timlin, American actress
- July 3 – Grant Rosenmeyer, American actor and screenwriter
- July 5 – Jason Dolley, American actor
- July 6 – Victoire Thivisol, French actress
- July 7
  - James Burrows, English actor
  - Eve Hewson, Irish actress
- July 8
  - Jamie Blackley, Manx-born British actor
  - Thuso Mbedu, South African actress
  - Luke Pensabene, American actor and film producer
- July 9 – Mitchel Musso, American actor
- July 11 – Kentaro Sakaguchi, actor and model
- July 12 – Erik Per Sullivan, American actor
- July 16 – Alexandra Shipp, American actress
- July 29 – Jahmil French, Canadian actor (died 2021)
- August 4 – Lucinda Dryzek, English actress
- August 12 – Lakeith Stanfield, American actor
- August 13 – Nikita Hopkins, American screenwriter, visual artist and former child voice actor
- August 16 – Evanna Lynch, Irish actress
- August 17 – Austin Butler, American actor
- August 22 – Naomi Ackie, English actress
- August 23 – Jake Manley, Canadian actor
- August 26 – Dylan O'Brien, American actor
- August 27 – Young Mazino, American actor
- August 28
  - Humberto Carrão, Brazilian actor
  - Kyle Massey, American actor
- September 2 - Damson Idris, Nigerian-British actor and producer
- September 4 – Carter Jenkins, American actor
- September 5 – Skandar Keynes, English actor
- September 9
  - Yang Yang, Chinese actor
  - Kelsey Chow, American actress
- September 17 – Mena Massoud, Egyptian-born Canadian actor and singer
- September 19 – Tyler Neitzel, American actor
- September 20
  - Spencer Locke, American actress
  - Jonah Meyerson, American actor and producer
- September 25 – Alix Bénézech, French actress
- September 26 - Charlotte Spencer, English actress and singer
- September 27 – Thomas Mann, American actress
- October 3 – Derek Klena, American actor and singer
- October 5 – Xiao Zhan, Chinese actor
- October 6 – Roshon Fegan, American actor, dancer, and rapper
- October 15
  - Josefin Asplund, Swedish actress
  - Charlotte Hope, English actress
- October 18
  - Tyler Posey, American actor and musician
  - Toby Regbo, English actor
- October 19 – Samantha Robinson, American actress
- October 23 – Sophie Oda, American actress
- October 25 – Lorina Kamburova, Bulgarian actress (d. 2021)
- October 27 – Bryan Craig, American actor
- October 28 – Mart Müürisepp, Estonian actor
- October 31
  - Jordan-Claire Green, American actress
  - Junglepussy, American rapper and actress
- November 1 – Anthony Ramos, American actor and singer-songwriter
- November 4
  - Tanya Reynolds, English actress
  - Bee Vang, American actor
- November 8 – Riker Lynch, American actor, singer, musician
- November 10 – Genevieve Buechner, Canadian actress
- November 11
  - Christa B. Allen, American actress
  - Travis Tope, American actor
- November 13
  - Matt Bennett, American actor
  - Devon Bostick, Canadian actor
- November 15 – Shailene Woodley, American actress
- November 30 – Aoife Hinds, British-Irish actress
- December 10 – KiKi Layne, American actress
- December 12 – Jaime Lorente, Spanish actor
- December 15
  - Eunice Cho, American actress
  - Alana Haim, American musician and actress
- December 19 – Keiynan Lonsdale, Australian actor, dancer and singer-songwriter
- December 20
  - Jillian Rose Reed, American actress
  - Colin Woodell, American actor
- December 24 – Sofia Black-D'Elia, American actress
- December 27 – Chloe Bridges, American actress

== Deaths ==
Month	Date	Name	Age	Country	Profession	Notable films
January	2	Pato Guzman	57	US	Production Designer	The In-Laws; Down and Out in Beverly Hills
January	4	Richard Maibaum	81	US	Screenwriter	James Bond; Ransom!
January	12	Keye Luke	86	China	Actor	Gremlins; The Green Hornet
January	14	David Arkin	49	US	Actor	All the President's Men; MASH
January	19	Don Beddoe	87	US	Actor	The Best Years of Our Lives; The Night of the Hunter
January	19	Jo Eisinger	81	US	Screenwriter	Gilda; Night and the City
January	19	John Russell	70	US	Actor	Pale Rider; Rio Bravo
January	25	Lilian Bond	83	UK	Actress	The Old Dark House; The Westerner
January	30	John McIntire	83	US	Actor	Psycho; The Asphalt Jungle
February	1	Carol Dempster	89	US	Actress	Sally of the Sawdust; Dream Street
February	1	James MacDonald	84	UK	Sound Engineer, Voice Actor	Alice in Wonderland; Cinderella
February	2	Natalie Kingston	85	US	Actress	Tarzan the Tiger; River of Romance
February	3	Nancy Kulp	69	US	Actress	Shane; Sabrina
February	5	Dean Jagger	87	US	Actor	White Christmas; Elmer Gantry
February	6	Danny Thomas	77	US	Actor	The Jazz Singer; I'll See You in My Dreams
February	12	Ruth Morley	65	Austria	Costume Designer	Annie Hall; Taxi Driver
February	19	Peggy Mondo	63	US	Actress	The Music Man; Fatso
February	24	George Gobel	71	US	Actor	I Married a Woman; The Birds and the Bees
February	24	Jean Rogers	74	US	Actress	Flash Gordon; Backlash
February	25	John Dunning	74	US	Film Editor	Ben-Hur; Julius Caesar
February	26	Bernard W. Burton	92	US	Film Editor	The Beast from 20,000 Fathoms; One Hundred Men and a Girl
February	26	Slim Gaillard	75	US	Singer, Actor	Sweetheart of Sigma Chi; Sky Bandits
March	3	Vance Colvig	72	US	Actor	UHF; Barfly
March	5	Ian McLellan Hunter	71	UK	Screenwriter	Roman Holiday; Second Chorus
March	6	Salvo Randone	84	Italy	Actor	Fellini Satyricon; Hands Over the City
March	7	Morton S. Fine	74	US	Screenwriter	The Pawnbroker; The Greek Tycoon
March	14	Howard Ashman	40	US	Lyricist	The Little Mermaid; Beauty and the Beast
March	15	George Sherman	78	US	Director	Big Jake; Larceny
March	18	Vilma Bánky	90	Hungary	Actress	The Winning of Barbara Worth; Two Lovers
March	18	Narda Onyx	59	Estonia	Actress	Jesse James Meets Frankenstein's Daughter; Hitler
March	22	Gloria Holden	82	UK	Actress	The Life of Emile Zola; Dracula's Daughter
March	22	R. L. Ryan	44	US	Actor	Mannequin; The Toxic Avenger
March	23	Mona Maris	87	Argentina	Actress	Romance of the Rio Grande; The Falcon in Mexico
March	27	Aldo Ray	64	US	Actor	We're No Angels; Battle Cry
March	28	Carlos Montalbán	87	Mexico	Actor	Bananas; The Out-of-Towners
April	3	Graham Greene	86	UK	Screenwriter	The Third Man; Our Man in Havana
April	9	Maurice Binder	72	UK	Title Designer	James Bond; The Last Emperor
April	10	Kevin Peter Hall	35	US	Actor	Predator; Harry and the Hendersons
April	10	Natalie Schafer	90	US	Actress	Anastasia; The Snake Pit
April	12	Tom Rosqui	62	US	Actor	The Godfather Part II; The Thomas Crown Affair
April	16	David Lean	83	UK	Director	Lawrence of Arabia; Doctor Zhivago
April	20	Don Siegel	78	US	Director	Dirty Harry; The Shootist
April	23	William Dozier	83	US	Producer	Batman; American Gigolo
April	26	Carmine Coppola	80	US	Composer	Apocalypse Now; The Godfather Part III
April	26	A. B. Guthrie Jr.	90	US	Screenwriter	Shane; The Kentuckian
April	28	Ken Curtis	74	US	Actor	The Searchers; The Alamo
May	1	Richard Thorpe	95	US	Director	Jailhouse Rock; Ivanhoe
May	2	Jerzy Kosiński	57	Poland	Screenwriter, Actor	Being There; Reds
May	5	Laura Kerr	88	US	Screenwriter	The Farmer's Daughter; Grounds for Marriage
May	6	Wilfrid Hyde-White	87	UK	Actor	My Fair Lady; The Third Man
May	8	Ronnie Brody	72	UK	Actor	Superman III; A Funny Thing Happened on the Way to the Forum
May	11	Dino Diluca	88	Italy	Actor	The Cardinal; La Cieca di Sorrento
May	15	Ronald Lacey	55	UK	Actor	Raiders of the Lost Ark; Flesh & Blood
May	18	Edwina Booth	86	US	Actress	The Midnight Patrol; The Vanishing Legion
May	18	Muriel Box	85	UK	Director, Screenwriter	The Truth About Women; The Seventh Veil
May	23	Fletcher Markle	70	Canada	Director	The Man with a Cloak; Jigsaw
May	26	Eugène Lourié	88	Ukraine	Art Director, Production Designer	Limelight; Bronco Billy
May	29	Coral Browne	77	Australia	Actress	Auntie Mame; The Killing of Sister George
May	31	Manolo Gómez Bur	74	Spain	Actor	Amor a la española; Una chica casi decente
June	3	Eva Le Gallienne	92	UK	Actress	Resurrection; The Devil's Disciple
June	8	Heidi Bruhl	49	Germany	Actress	Captain Sindbad; The Eiger Sanction
June	12	Peggy Ashcroft	83	UK	Actress	A Passage to India; When the Wind Blows
June	12	Bernard Miles	83	UK	Actor	The Man Who Knew Too Much; Great Expectations
June	15	Barry Kelley	82	US	Actor	The Asphalt Jungle; The Manchurian Candidate
June	16	Joan Caulfield	69	US	Actress	The Unsuspected; Blue Skies
June	18	Ronald Allen	60	UK	Actor	A Night to Remember; Circle of Deception
June	19	Jean Arthur	90	US	Actress	Mr. Smith Goes to Washington; Shane
June	23	Lea Padovani	70	Italy	Actress	Three Steps North; The Intruder
June	26	Jack Marta	88	US	Cinematographer	Cat Ballou; Walking Tall
June	27	Milton Subotsky	69	US	Producer, Screenwriter	Dr. Terror's House of Horrors; Tales from the Crypt
June	30	John B. Goodman	89	US	Art Director	Hang 'Em High; Shadow of a Doubt
July	1	Michael Landon	54	US	Actor	I Was a Teenage Werewolf; The Legend of Tom Dooley
July	2	Don Houghton	61	France	Screenwriter	Dracula A.D. 1972; The Satanic Rites of Dracula
July	2	Lee Remick	55	US	Actress	Days of Wine and Roses; Anatomy of a Murder
July	5	Mildred Dunnock	90	US	Actress	The Story on Page One; BUtterfield 8
July	8	James Franciscus	57	US	Actor	Beneath the Planet of the Apes; Marooned
July	11	Atang de la Rama	89	Philippines	Actress, Singer	Dalagang Bukid; Walang Sugat
July	15	Bert Convy	57	US	Actor	Semi-Tough; Weekend Warriors
July	21	Theodore Wilson	47	US	Actor	The River Niger; The Hunter
August	1	Helen Page Camp	60	US	Actress	Cold Turkey; Telefon
August	4	Don DaGradi	80	US	Screenwriter	Mary Poppins; The Love Bug
August	16	Bruno Nicolai	65	Italy	Composer	Caligula; The Mercenary
August	16	Luigi Zampa	86	Italy	Director	The Traffic Policeman; Difficult Years
August	17	Don Dubbins	65	US	Actor	Tribute to a Bad Man; From the Earth to the Moon
August	18	David Gale	54	UK	Actor	Re-Animator; The First Power
August	21	Richard Wilson	75	US	Director	Invitation to a Gunfighter; Al Capone
August	22	Colleen Dewhurst	67	Canada	Actress	The Nun's Story; The Last Run
August	25	Niven Busch	88	US	Screenwriter	The Postman Always Rings Twice; Distant Drums
August	26	Alan Barrett	52-53	UK	Costume Designer	The Seven-Per-Cent Solution; Far from the Madding Crowd
August	28	Alekos Sakellarios	77	Greece	Director, Screenwriter	Thanassakis o politevomenos; Woe to the Young
August	29	Dallas Adams	44	UK	Actor	The Abominable Dr. Phibes; King Ralph
August	29	Dixie Dunbar	72	US	Actress	Educating Father; Sing and Be Happy
August	30	Alan Wheatley	84	UK	Actor	Brighton Rock; The Rake's Progress
September	3	Jean Bourgoin	78	France	Cinematographer	The Longest Day; Mon Oncle
September	3	Frank Capra	94	US	Director	It Happened One Night; It's a Wonderful Life
September	4	Tom Tryon	65	US	Actor	The Cardinal; In Harm's Way
September	7	Ben Piazza	58	US	Actor	The Bad News Bears; The Hanging Tree
September	8	Brad Davis	41	US	Actor	Midnight Express; Chariots of Fire
September	8	Alex North	80	US	Composer	Viva Zapata!; Spartacus
September	13	Joe Pasternak	89	Romania	Producer	The Great Caruso; The Courtship of Eddie's Father
September	14	Julie Bovasso	61	US	Actress	Saturday Night Fever; Moonstruck
September	15	John Hoyt	85	US	Actor	Blackboard Jungle; When Worlds Collide
September	16	Carol White	48	UK	Actress	Daddy's Gone A-Hunting; Something Big
September	21	Angelo Rossitto	83	US	Actor	Freaks; Mad Max Beyond Thunderdome
September	23	Chuck Vincent	51	US	Director, Producer, Screenwriter	Preppies; Hollywood Hot Tubs
September	24	Mary Lawrence	73	US	Actress	County Fair; The Stratton Story
September	25	Ralph Jester	90	US	Costume Designer	The Ten Commandments; The Buccaneer
September	25	Viviane Romance	79	France	Actress	Liliom; La Bandera
September	27	Floyd Huddleston	79	US	Songwriter	The Aristocats; Robin Hood
October	6	Phil Feldman	69	US	Producer	The Wild Bunch; Blue Thunder
October	9	Thalmus Rasulala	51	US	Actor	Cool Breeze; Mr. Ricco
October	11	Redd Foxx	68	US	Actor, Comedian	Cotton Comes to Harlem; Harlem Nights
October	12	Sheila Florance	75	Australia	Actress	Mad Max; A Woman's Tale
October	12	Diana Gibson	76	US	Actress	Adventure's End; Behind the Headlines
October	12	Aline MacMahon	92	US	Actress	The Man from Laramie; Diamond Head
October	12	Regis Toomey	93	US	Actor	His Girl Friday; Meet John Doe
October	13	Donald Houston	67	UK	Actor	The Blue Lagoon; Where Eagles Dare
October	14	Gene Roddenberry	70	US	Producer	Star Trek: The Motion Picture; Pretty Maids All in a Row
October	15	Han Ying-chieh	64	China	Actor	The Big Boss; Come Drink with Me
October	16	Arthur Arling	85	US	Cinematographer	Pillow Talk; The Yearling
October	17	J. G. Devlin	84	Ireland	Actor	Darby O'Gill and the Little People; The Miracle
October	22	Judy Kelly	77	Australia	Actress	Dead of Night; Premiere
October	25	Khigh Dhiegh	81	USA	Actor	The Manchurian Candidate; Seconds
October	25	John Stratton	65	UK	Actor	The Cruel Sea; Frankenstein and the Monster from Hell
October	26	Joe Lapis	92	Hungary	Sound Engineer	The Wolf Man; Spartacus
October	28	Sylvia Fine	78	US	Lyricist, Composer, Producer	The Court Jester; The Five Pennies
October	29	John DeCuir	73	US	Art Director, Production Designer	Cleopatra; Ghostbusters
November	2	Irwin Allen	75	US	Producer, Director, Screenwriter	The Poseidon Adventure; The Towering Inferno
November	5	Fred MacMurray	83	US	Actor	Double Indemnity; The Caine Mutiny
November	6	Gene Tierney	70	US	Actress	Leave Her to Heaven; Laura
November	10	Tutte Lemkow	73	Norway	Actor, Choreographer	Fiddler on the Roof; Raiders of the Lost Ark
November	11	Morton Stevens	62	US	Composer	Wild and Wonderful; Hardly Working
November	12	Diane Brewster	60	US	Actress	Torpedo Run; The Young Philadelphians
November	12	Gabriele Tinti	59	Italy	Actor	Son of Django; Emanuelle in America
November	13	Yves Montand	70	France	Actor, Singer	The Wages of Fear; On a Clear Day You Can See Forever
November	14	Tony Richardson	63	UK	Director	Tom Jones; Hamlet
November	19	Reggie Nalder	84	Austria	Actor	The Man Who Knew Too Much; Mark of the Devil
November	20	Daniel Mann	89	US	Director	Come Back, Little Sheba; The Rose Tattoo
November	21	Robert Kaufman	60	US	Screenwriter	Divorce American Style; Love at First Bite
November	22	Tadashi Imai	79	Japan	Director	Jun'ai Monogatari; Bushido, Samurai Saga
November	23	Klaus Kinski	65	Germany	Actor	Aguirre, the Wrath of God; Nosferatu the Vampyre
November	24	Anton Furst	47	UK	Production Designer	Full Metal Jacket; Batman
November	24	Freddie Mercury	45	UK	Singer, Songwriter	Flash Gordon; Highlander
November	25	Eleanor Audley	86	US	Actress	Cinderella; Sleeping Beauty
November	27	Ralph Bellamy	87	US	Actor	His Girl Friday; Trading Places
November	27	George Edwards	67	US	Producer	Voyage to the Prehistoric Planet; Harper Valley PTA
November	28	Mel Dinelli	79	US	Screenwriter	The Spiral Staircase; Beware, My Lovely
December	7	Herb Jaffe	70	US	Producer	The Wind and the Lion; Fright Night
December	11	Robert Q. Lewis	70	US	Actor	Ski Party; An Affair to Remember
December	11	Pat Walshe	91	US	Actor	The Wizard of Oz
December	12	Eleanor Boardman	93	US	Actress	Vanity Fair; Souls for Sale
December	13	Judy Moorcroft	58	UK	Costume Designer	The Europeans; A Passage to India
December	19	Ernest K. Gann	81	US	Screenwriter	The High and the Mighty; Soldier of Fortune
December	19	Paul Maxwell	70	Canada	Actor	Indiana Jones and the Last Crusade; Aliens
December	23	Gene Milford	89	US	Film Editor	On the Waterfront; Lost Horizon
December	18	Jacques Aubuchon	67	US	Actor	Thunder Road; The Silver Chalice
December	25	Curt Bois	90	Germany	Actor	Casablanca; Wings of Desire
December	28	Cassandra Harris	43	Australia	Actress	For Your Eyes Only; Rough Cut

== Film debuts ==
- Bruce Altman – Regarding Henry
- Tom Arnold – Freddy's Dead: The Final Nightmare
- Shawn Ashmore – Married to It
- Monica Bellucci – La Riffa
- Halle Berry – Jungle Fever
- Jason Biggs – The Boy Who Cried Bitch
- W. Earl Brown – Backdraft
- Steve Carell – Curly Sue
- James Caviezel – My Own Private Idaho
- Morris Chestnut – Boyz n the Hood
- Sarita Choudhury – Mississippi Masala
- Rory Cochrane – A Kiss Before Dying
- Clifton Collins Jr. – Grand Canyon
- Ice Cube – Boyz n the Hood
- Leonardo DiCaprio – Critters 3
- Wayne Duvall – Final Approach
- Christopher Eccleston – Let Him Have It
- Ethan Embry – Defending Your Life
- Brendan Fraser – Dogfight
- Edward Furlong – Terminator 2: Judgment Day
- Janeane Garofalo – Late for Dinner
- Paul Giamatti – Past Midnight
- Richard Grieco – If Looks Could Kill
- Eddie Griffin – Dice Rules
- Jake Gyllenhaal – City Slickers
- Philip Seymour Hoffman – Triple Bogey on a Par Five Hole
- Joshua Jackson – Crooked Hearts
- Josh Keaton – All I Want for Christmas
- Keegan-Michael Key – Lunatics: A Love Story
- Daniel Dae Kim – American Shaolin
- Regina King – Boyz n the Hood
- Queen Latifah – Jungle Fever
- Denis Leary – Strictly Business
- Téa Leoni – Switch
- Matthew Lillard – Ghoulies III: Ghoulies Go to College
- Jason London – The Man in the Moon
- Louis Mandylor – Necessary Roughness
- Leslie Mann – Virgin High
- Michael Massee – My Father Is Coming
- Simon McBurney – Kafka
- Michael McDonald – Uncaged
- Breckin Meyer – Freddy's Dead: The Final Nightmare
- Jeffrey Dean Morgan – Uncaged
- Elisabeth Moss – Suburban Commando
- Kathy Najimy – The Hard Way
- Thandiwe Newton – Flirting
- Sophie Okonedo – Young Soul Rebels
- Gwyneth Paltrow – Shout
- Teri Polo – Born to Ride
- John Prosky – Late for Dinner
- Marie Richardson – Riktiga män bär alltid slips
- Richard Roxburgh – Dead to the World
- Til Schweiger – Manta, Manta
- David Schwimmer – Flight of the Intruder
- Rufus Sewell – Twenty-One
- Marley Shelton – Grand Canyon
- Jeremy Sisto – Grand Canyon
- Jon Tenney – Guilty by Suspicion
- Andrew Tiernan – Edward II
- Maura Tierney – Dead Women in Lingerie
- Vince Vaughn – For the Boys
- Daniel von Bargen – The Silence of the Lambs
- Steven Waddington – Edward II
- Kari Wahlgren – Mobile Suit Gundam F91
- Isaiah Washington – The Color of Love
- Reese Witherspoon – The Man in the Moon
