= Gordon Norton =

Canadian yacht racer (1924–2018)

- Born: Gordon F.R. Norton; November 2, 1924; Toronto, Ontario, Canada
- Died: June 18, 2018 (aged 93)
- Education: Engineering Degree from the University of Toronto
- Occupations: Olympic Athlete – Sailing; Commodore – Royal Canadian Yacht Club; Entrepreneur - Geighten Assc.
- Spouse: Charlotte Norton
- Children: Christopher Norton; Cathy Hann; Paul Norton

Gordon Norton (November 2, 1924 – June 18, 2018) was a Canadian yacht racer and Commodore of the Royal Canadian Yacht Club in 1975–1976. He competed in the 1960 Summer Olympics as part of the Argo II crew who finished fifth in the Dragon class under skipper Sandy MacDonald and with crew member Lynn Watters.
