= Maurice Kelly =

Maurice Kelly may refer to:

- Maurice Kelly (hurler) (1863–?), Irish hurler
- Maurice Kelly (gridiron football) (born 1972), American football defensive back
- Maurice Kelly (priest) (1884–1926), Anglican priest and co-founder of the Community of the Ascension
- Maurice Kelly (sailor), Bahamian sailor
