= Jan van den Berg =

Jan van den Berg may refer to:

- Jan van den Bergh (painter) (1587–1660), Dutch painter
- Jan van den Berg (footballer) (1879–1951), Dutch footballer
- Jan Van den Bergh (born 1994), Belgian footballer

== See also ==
- Jack van den Berg (born 1959), Dutch football manager and a former player
- Jacq van den Berg (1916–unknown), Dutch sailor
