= Alan Kane =

Alan or Allan Kane may refer to:

- Alan Kane (artist), British contemporary artist
- Alan Kane (author), author of Scrambles in the Canadian Rockies
- Alan Kane (Gaelic footballer), Irish sportsperson who represented Donegal
- Alan Kane (politician), former Democratic Unionist Party politician from Northern Ireland
- Allan Kane (pole vaulter) (born 1948), Canadian athlete

== See also ==
- Alan Cain, Australian sailor
