= David Ryder =

David Ryder may refer to:

- David J. Ryder (born 1955), Director of the United States Mint 1992–1993 and 2018–2021
- David Ryder (sailor) (1934–1985), Irish Olympic sailor
