= Camoletti =

Camoletti is a surname. Notable people with the name include:

- Marc Camoletti (playwright) (playwright) (1923–2003), French playwright
- Marc Camoletti (architect) (1857–1940), Swiss architect; namesake and grandfather of the playwright.
- Pierre Camoletti, a Swiss sailor.
