= Mieg =

Mieg is a Spanish surname. Notable people with the surname include:

- Achilles Mieg (1731–1799), Swiss physician and botanist.
- François Thierry-Mieg (1908–1995), a high-ranking member of Bureau Central de Renseignements et d'Action (BCRA)
- Juan Mieg (1780–1859), Swiss professor and naturalist who arrived in Spain
- Miguel Mieg (1896–1981), Spanish footballer
- Peter Mieg (1906–1990), Swiss composer, painter, and journalist
- Tomás Escriche y Mieg (1844–1935), Spanish teacher and volapükist
