= Philippe Reinhart =

French sailor

Personal information
- Nationality: French
- Born: 26 December 1924 Sainte-Adresse, France
- Died: 16 July 2016 (aged 91) Paris, France

Sport
- Sport: Sailing

Philippe Reinhart (26 December 1924 – 16 July 2016) was a French sailor. He competed in the Dragon event at the 1960 Summer Olympics.
