= Víctor Trinchín =

Uruguayan sailor

Personal information
- Born: 14 August 1911; Montevideo, Uruguay
- Died: 23 May 2001 (aged 89)

Sport
- Sport: Sailing

Víctor Trinchín (14 August 1911 – 23 May 2001) was a Uruguayan sailor. He competed in the Dragon event at the 1960 Summer Olympics.
