= Thomas Durcan =

Singaporean sailor

Personal information
- Nationality: Singaporean
- Born: 26 August 1920; London, England
- Died: 1998 (aged 77–78)

Sport
- Sport: Sailing

Thomas Kevin Durcan (26 August 1920 – 1998) was a Singaporean sailor. He competed in the Dragon event at the 1960 Summer Olympics.
