= Odeon Marble Arch =

Former cinema in London, England

Coordinates: 51°30′49″N 0°9′37″W

The Odeon Marble Arch (known as the Regal from 1928 to 1945) was a cinema in London located opposite Marble Arch, at the top of Park Lane, with its main entrance on Edgware Road. It operated in various forms from 1928 to 2016, and is most famous for once housing a vast screen capable of screening films in 70mm. The machines were Cinemeccanica Victoria 8 models.

== Regal/Odeon Marble Arch (1928–1964) ==
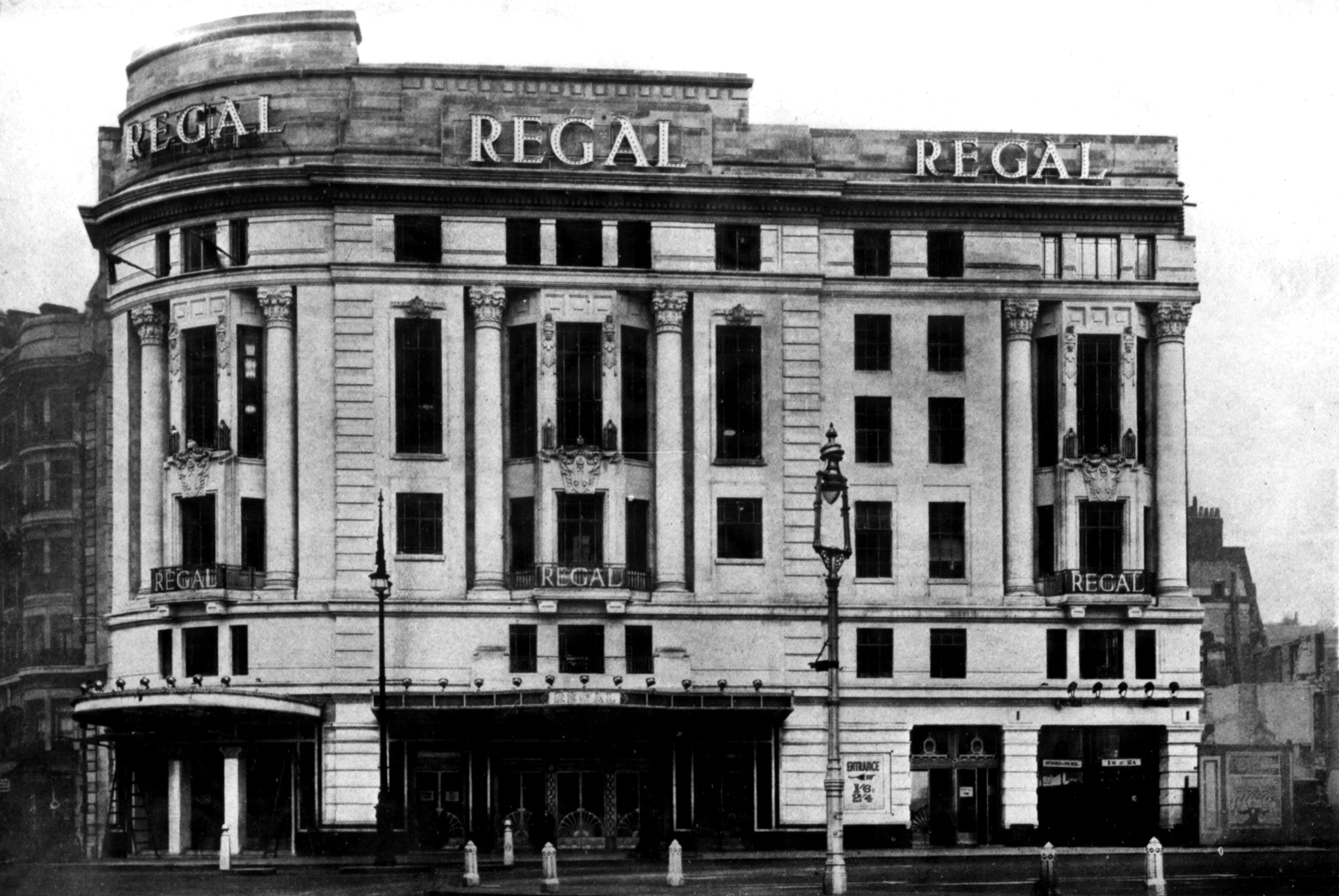
The 1928 Regal Cinema, designed by Clifford Augustus Aish

The cinema was first known as the Regal, opening on 29 November 1928 with Al Jolson in The Singing Fool. With a facade 100-foot (30 m) high constructed in Portland stone, the building was a notable addition to the West End. The auditorium, arranged in traditional circle and stalls, owed much to the atmospheric style of the U.S., having many Romanesque motifs and much faux decor. It was also fitted with a Christie organ, the largest theatre organ ever built outside the U.S., fitted with 2,514 pipes, a 32-note carillon (the only real organ-operated carillon in the United Kingdom) and a wide variety of special sound effects to accompany the films.

Within six months of opening, the cinema was taken over by ABC Cinemas, who operated it until early January 1945. It was then taken over by Odeon Cinemas. It was refurbished by the new owners, but shortly before re-opening it was damaged by one of the last V-1 flying bombs to hit London. Hence, it remained closed until September 1945, when it was re-opened as the Odeon Marble Arch and continued as a first-run house.

However, by the early 1960s its interior was decidedly faded and neglected. The cinema's film runs had by this point declined to minor circuit pictures or even dubbed foreign films: insufficient to fill its large house. Hence, on 22 March 1964 it closed with The Long Ships, was demolished and replaced (the architect being T. P. Bennett and Son) by an office block and a new modern cinema, capable of playing the new widescreen formats. The new cinema, built above Marble Arch tube station, required elaborate structural shock absorbers to prevent vibrations from the passing trains from disturbing the film projection.

== Odeon Marble Arch (1967–1996) ==
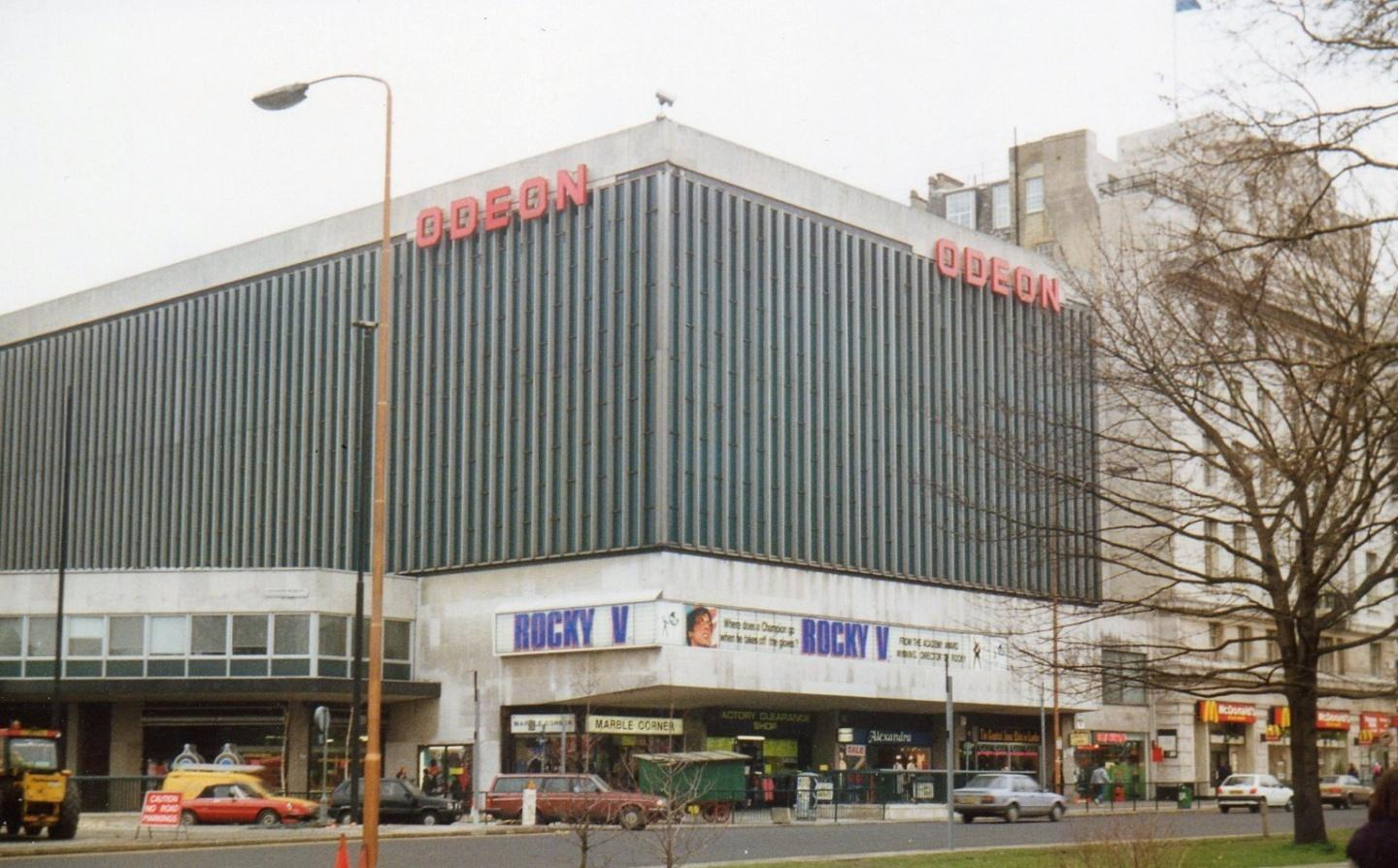
1991

Opening in 1967, the Odeon was the largest cinema constructed in the post-war years. The screen, measuring 75 feet (23 m) by 30 feet (9.1 m), with a depth of curvature of 17 feet (5.2 m), was the largest in the country. Projection was level, beaming from the rear of the stalls, allowing for an even image.

The cinema was constructed to showcase films in the various 70mm processes, in particular Dimension 150, as well as conventional 35mm films, allowing for considerable spectacle. However, it opened on 2 February 1967 with a Gala Premiere of A Funny Thing Happened on the Way to the Forum, a 35mm film in standard wide screen (1.75:1). This played for seven weeks and was followed by other 35mm presentations, including the World Premiere of Robbery on 21 September 1967. It was not until 16 October 1967 that the new Odeon played its first 70mm roadshow presentation with the Royal World Premiere of Far from the Madding Crowd in the presence of Princess Margaret. This was followed by the Royal World Premiere in the presence of HM Queen Elizabeth II on 12 December of Doctor Dolittle, also a 70mm roadshow presentation which ran until 9 October 1968. Subsequent 70mm roadshow presentations were Finian's Rainbow, Hellfighters, and revivals of West Side Story and Gone With the Wind. On 21 December 1969 the Royal Charity UK Premiere of Hello Dolly took place in the presence of The Duke of Edinburgh and ran until August 1970 when it was followed by Cromwell. By the early seventies the supply of 70mm roadshow films was drying up; the Odeon found itself playing ordinary 35mm releases including Disney's Bedknobs and Broomsticks and Herbie Rides Again, and 70mm presentations became few and far between.

The auditorium, seating 1360 in total, was split between a raked circle (front and rear) and stalls (stepped towards the rear), with excellent sight-lines throughout. Textured fibreglass panelling was fitted to the side walls, partially concealing gold glass cloth backing, and variable lighting was installed in the outer rim of the ceiling to play different coloured schemes over the walls during intermissions. A single set of tabs (curtains) revealed the screen. Foyer areas were reached via escalator from a ground-floor box office; the upper foyer featured a fishpond. A somewhat flatter screen was installed following the revival of Lawrence of Arabia, to allow for a less distorted view of the desert skylines. Digital sound was installed in the 1990s, including ceiling speakers.

A special screening in September 1996 of Richard Attenborough's Gandhi in 70mm and six-track magnetic sound marked the end of the Odeon as a single-screen cinema.

== Conversion (1997–2016) ==
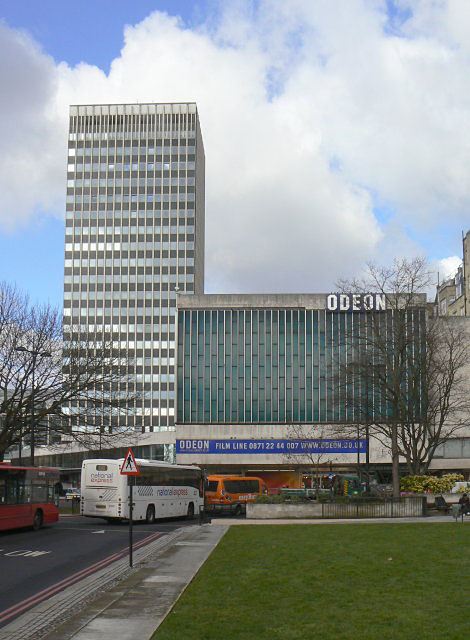
In 2009

In January 1997, the cinema reopened as a five-screen multiplex, converted within the existing space. The circle was split into two interlocked screens; rear stalls similarly, all fitted out with new finishes. A further auditorium was positioned in the former front stalls, with some of the 1960s sidewall panelling retained, and its screen was positioned in the same location, albeit somewhat reduced in size to allow for the adjusted sightlines from a much smaller auditorium.

The closure and conversion had been mooted for several years, and public outcry at losing such a spectacular venue – most notably in the pages of the London weekly listings magazine Time Out, in which Hellboy screenwriter Peter Briggs played a vocal role – delayed the process on at least one occasion.

In March 2011, the cinema had its 35mm projectors and CP65 sound processors removed and went fully digital in all five screens, using NEC digital projectors with Doremi servers. Only screen one retained its Victoria 8 35mm projector and Cinemecanica non-rewind system alongside the digital system for the occasional 35mm shows. The digital network within the cinema was overseen by Unique Digital using its Rosetta Bridge Theatre Management System and any problems could be dealt with remotely from their network operations centre in Norway.

On 8 May 2016, the Odeon Marble Arch closed, and it was demolished later that year.

A replacement multi-screen cinema was intended to be included within the new development, but in October 2021 developer Almacantar announced that plans to include a new cinema had been dropped.
