= Carl Otto Svae =

Norwegian sailor

Personal information
- Nationality: Norwegian
- Born: 4 April 1918; Kristiania, Norway
- Died: 30 June 1977 (aged 59)

Sport
- Sport: Sailing

Carl Otto Svae (4 April 1918 – 30 June 1977) was a Norwegian sailor born in Kristiania. He competed at the 1960 Summer Olympics in Rome, coming fourth in the Dragon class, together with Øivind Christensen and Arild Amundsen.
