= Eduard Stayson =

Soviet sailor

Personal information
- Nationality: Soviet
- Born: 13 April 1923 Saint Petersburg, Russia
- Died: 22 July 1992 (aged 69)

Sport
- Sport: Sailing

Eduard Stayson (13 April 1923 – 22 July 1992) was a Soviet sailor. He competed in the Dragon event at the 1960 Summer Olympics.
