= Eri Sudewo =

Indonesian sailor

Personal information
- Nationality: Indonesian
- Born: 12 May 1919; Pasuruan, Dutch East Indies

Sport
- Sport: Sailing

Eri Sudewo (born 12 May 1919, date of death unknown) was an Indonesian sailor. He competed in the Dragon event at the 1960 Summer Olympics.
