= Claude Kohler =

American sailor (1931–2019)

Personal information
- Born: September 26, 1931 New Orleans, Louisiana, United States
- Died: June 27, 2019 (aged 87)

Sport
- Sport: Sailing

Claude Kohler (September 26, 1931 – June 27, 2019) was an American sailor. He competed in the Dragon event at the 1960 Summer Olympics.
