= Robert Thorens =

Swiss sailor

Personal information
- Nationality: Swiss
- Born: 5 August 1908; Geneva, Switzerland

Sport
- Sport: Sailing

Robert Thorens (born 5 August 1908, date of death unknown) was a Swiss sailor. He competed in the Dragon event at the 1960 Summer Olympics.
