= Lasse Dahlman =

Finnish sailor

Personal information
- Nationality: Finnish
- Born: 9 April 1931; Helsinki, Finland
- Died: 19 January 1975 (aged 43); Espoo, Finland

Sport
- Sport: Sailing

Lasse Dahlman (9 April 1931 – 19 January 1975) was a Finnish sailor. He competed in the Dragon event at the 1960 Summer Olympics.
