= Arild Amundsen =

Norwegian sailor

Personal information
- Nationality: Norwegian
- Born: 22 May 1910; Kristiania, Norway
- Died: 14 April 1988 (aged 77)

Sport
- Sport: Sailing

Arild Amundsen (22 May 1910 – 14 April 1988) was a Norwegian sailor. He was born in Kristiania. He competed at the 1960 Summer Olympics in Rome, coming fourth in the Dragon class, together with Øivind Christensen and Carl Otto Svae.
