= Peter Rebien =

German sailor

Personal information
- Nationality: German
- Born: 25 September 1935 (age 89); Travemünde, Germany

Sport
- Sport: Sailing

Peter Rebien (born 25 September 1935) is a German sailor. He competed in the Dragon event at the 1960 Summer Olympics.
