= Josef Muskita =

Indonesian sailor

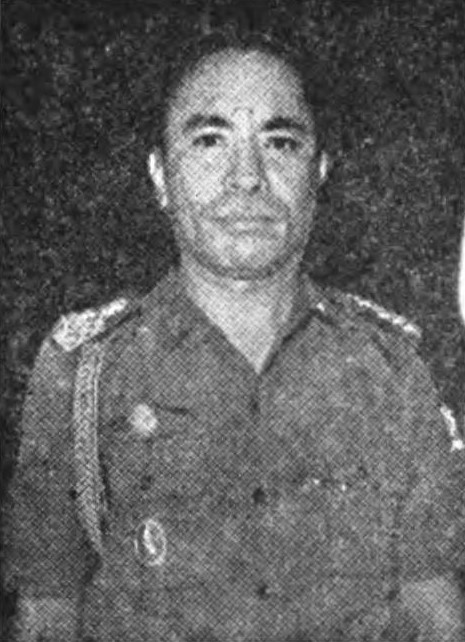

Personal information
- Nationality: Indonesian
- Born: 28 July 1924 Magelang, Dutch East Indies
- Died: 1 March 2006 (aged 81) Jakarta, Indonesia

Sport
- Sport: Sailing

Josef Muskita (28 July 1924 – 1 March 2006) was an Indonesian sailor. He competed in the Dragon event at the 1960 Summer Olympics.
