= Setsuo Kawada =

Japanese sailor

Personal information
- Nationality: Japanese
- Born: 3 March 1934 (age 91); Tokyo, Japan

Sport
- Sport: Sailing

Setsuo Kawada (born 3 March 1934) is a Japanese sailor. He competed in the Dragon event at the 1960 Summer Olympics.
