= Richard Masters (sailor) =

Bermudian sailor

Personal information
- Nationality: Bermudian
- Born: 10 July 1927 Bermuda
- Died: 1979 (aged 51-52) Bermuda

Sport
- Sport: Sailing

Richard Hosking Masters (10 July 1927 – 1979) was a Bermudian sailor. He competed in the Dragon event at the 1960 Summer Olympics.
