= Robin Benson (sailor) =

Irish sailor

Personal information
- Nationality: Irish
- Born: 2 May 1929; Dublin, Ireland
- Died: 15 June 2012 (aged 83)

Sport
- Sport: Sailing

Robin Benson (2 May 1929 – 15 June 2012) was an Irish sailor. He competed in the Dragon event at the 1960 Summer Olympics.
