= Giulio De Stefano =

Italian sailor (1929–2023)

Personal information
- Nationality: Italian
- Born: 6 May 1929 Castellammare di Stabia, Italy
- Died: 19 December 2023 (aged 94)
- Height: 1.78 m (5 ft 10 in)
- Weight: 74 kg (163 lb)

Sport
- Country: Italy
- Sport: Sailing
Medal record
Sailing
Representing Italy
Olympic Games
Bronze medal – third place	1960 Rome	Dragon

Giulio De Stefano (6 May 1929 – 19 December 2023) was an Italian sailor.

== Biography ==
De Stefano was born in Castellammare di Stabia on 6 May 1929. He won the bronze medal in dragon class at the 1960 Summer Olympics. De Stefano died on 19 December 2023, at the age of 94.
