= Antonio Cosentino (sailor) =

Italian sailor

Personal information
- Nationality: Italian
- Born: 10 March 1919 Naples, Italy
- Died: 1993 (aged 73–74)
- Height: 1.56 m (5 ft 1 1/2 in)
- Weight: 68 kg (150 lb)

Sailing career
- Sport: Sailing
Medal record
Sailing
Representing Italy
Olympic Games
Bronze medal – third place	1960 Rome	Dragon

Antonio Cosentino (10 March 1919 – 1993) was an Italian sailor. Cosentino was born in Naples. He won the bronze medal in dragon class at the 1960 Summer Olympics.
