= Vyacheslav Mozhayev =

Soviet sailor

Personal information
- Nationality: Soviet
- Born: 11 September 1938 (age 88) Saint Petersburg, Russia

Sport
- Sport: Sailing

Vyacheslav Mozhayev (born 11 September 1938) is a Soviet sailor. He competed in the Dragon event at the 1960 Summer Olympics.
