= Øivind Christensen =

Norwegian sailor

Personal information
- Nationality: Norwegian
- Born: 10 October 1899 Aker, Norway
- Died: 21 July 1988 (aged 88)

Sport
- Sport: Sailing

Øivind Christensen (10 October 1899 – 21 July 1988) was a Norwegian sailor. He was born in Aker. He competed at the 1960 Summer Olympics in Rome, coming fourth in the Dragon class, together with Arild Amundsen and Carl Otto Svae.
