= Henry Crouch =

English cricketer

Personal information
- Full name: Henry Russell Crouch
- Born: 10 February 1914; Calcutta, Bengal Presidency, British Raj
- Died: 17 April 1991 (aged 77); Walton-on-Thames, Surrey, England
- Batting: Right-handed
- Bowling: Right-arm medium

Domestic team information
- Years: Team
- 1946: Surrey
- 1935: Minor Counties

Career statistics
Competition	First-class
Matches	3
Runs scored	11
Batting average	3.66
100s/50s	–/–
Top score	7
Balls bowled	156
Wickets	2
Bowling average	50.50
5 wickets in innings	–
10 wickets in match	–
Best bowling	1/34
Catches/stumpings	1/–
- Source: ESPNcricinfo, 8 August 2012

Henry Russell Crouch (10 February 1914 – 17 April 1991) was an English cricketer. Crouch was a right-handed batsman who bowled right-arm medium pace. He was born at Calcutta in the British Raj.

Crouch made his debut for the Surrey Second XI against Cambridgeshire in the 1933 Minor Counties Championship. He made thirteen further appearances for the Surrey Second XI in the Minor Counties Championship, the last of which came against the Gloucestershire Second XI in 1939. Playing minor counties cricket for the Surrey Second XI allowed him to be selected for a combined Minor Counties cricket team in 1935, making two first-class appearances against Oxford University at the University Parks and the touring South Africans at Richmond Drive, Skegness. Against Oxford University, the Minor Counties lost the toss, with Oxford University electing to bat first. In a match heavily curtailed due to rain, Oxford University reached 169/4 in their first-innings, with Crouch bowling ten overs for 34 runs and taking the wicket of John Halliday. This was the only innings during the match, which subsequently ended as a draw. In his second appearance against the South Africans, the tourists won the toss and elected to bat first, compiling 394 all out, with Crouch taking the wicket of top-scorer Ken Viljoen for 168, to finish with figures of 1/67 from sixteen overs. The Minor Counties responded in their first-innings by making 190 all out, with Crouch being dismissed for a duck by Arthur Langton. Forced to follow-on in their second-innings, the Minor Counties were dismissed for 224, with Crouch being dismissed for 7 runs by Langton. The South Africans won the match by 10 wickets.

Following World War II, Crouch made a single first-class appearance for Surrey against the Combined Services at the Leyland Motors Ground, Kingston upon Thames. Surrey batted first, making 132 all out, with Crouch scoring 4 runs before he was dismissed by Barry Pryer. Thereafter, the match was curtailed by rain, with the Combined Services first-innings ending on 12/1.

He died on 17 April 1991, at Walton-on-Thames, Surrey.
