= Nikolay Yepifanov =

Soviet sailor

Personal information
- Nationality: Soviet
- Born: 10 October 1926 Saratov, Russia

Sport
- Sport: Sailing

Nikolay Yepifanov (born 10 October 1926) was a Soviet sailor. He competed in the Dragon event at the 1960 Summer Olympics.
