= Allen McClure =

American sailor

Personal information
- Born: March 17, 1935 New Orleans, Louisiana, United States
- Died: August 12, 2007 (aged 72) Drasco, Arkansas, United States

Sport
- Sport: Sailing

Allen McClure (March 17, 1935 – August 12, 2007) was an American sailor. He competed in the Dragon event at the 1960 Summer Olympics.
