= Heinrich Schaarschmidt =

Finnish sailor (1930–2019)

Personal information
- Nationality: Finnish
- Born: 27 February 1930; Helsinki, Finland
- Died: 16 January 2019 (aged 88); Helsinki, Finland

Sport
- Sport: Sailing

Heinrich Schaarschmidt (27 February 1930 – 16 January 2019) was a Finnish sailor. He competed in the Dragon event at the 1960 Summer Olympics.
