= Harold Brooke =

Australian sailor

Personal information
- Nationality: Australian
- Born: 1 August 1899; Melbourne, Australia
- Died: 6 October 1986 (aged 87)

Sport
- Sport: Sailing

Harold Brooke (1 August 1899 – 6 October 1986) was an Australian sailor. He competed in the Dragon event at the 1960 Summer Olympics.
