= Gonçalo Mello =

Portuguese sailor

Gonçalvo Mello
Personal information
- Full name: Gonçalo Dinis Pinheiro de Mello
- Nationality: Portuguese
- Born: 18 November 1931 (age 93); Cascais, Portugal

Sport
- Sport: Sailing

Gonçalo Dinis Pinheiro de Mello (born 18 November 1931) is a Portuguese former sailor. He competed in the Dragon event at the 1960 Summer Olympics.
