= Jean-Pierre Crovetto =

Monegasque sailor (born 1942)

Personal information
- Nationality: Monegasque
- Born: 20 June 1942 (age 84)

Sport
- Sport: Sailing
Medal record
Representing Monaco
Mediterranean Games
Bronze medal – third place	1963 Naples	Snipe class

Jean-Pierre Crovetto (born 20 June 1942) is a Monegasque sailor. He competed in the Dragon event at the 1960 Summer Olympics.
