= Santiago Pi =

Spanish sailor

Personal information
- Nationality: Spanish
- Born: 9 February 1930; Barcelona, Spain
- Died: 28 April 1993 (aged 63); Barcelona, Spain

Sport
- Sport: Sailing

Santiago Pi (9 February 1930 – 28 April 1993) was a Spanish sailor. He competed in the Dragon event at the 1960 Summer Olympics.
