= José Pi =

Spanish sailor (1932–1997)

Personal information
- Nationality: Spanish
- Born: 19 August 1932; Barcelona, Spain
- Died: 16 December 1997 (aged 65); Barcelona, Spain

Sport
- Sport: Sailing

José Pi (19 August 1932 – 16 December 1997) was a Spanish sailor. He competed in the Dragon event at the 1960 Summer Olympics.
