= Günther Benecke =

German sailor

Personal information
- Nationality: German
- Born: 10 May 1923; Hamburg, Germany
- Died: 8 January 1980 (aged 56); Hamburg, Germany

Sport
- Sport: Sailing

Günther Benecke (10 May 1923 – 8 January 1980) was a German sailor. He competed in the Dragon event at the 1960 Summer Olympics.
