= Yutaka Okamoto =

Japanese sailor

Personal information
- Nationality: Japanese
- Born: 2 March 1925 Kanagawa, Japan

Sport
- Sport: Sailing

Yutaka Okamoto (born 2 March 1925) was a Japanese sailor. He competed in the Dragon event at the 1960 Summer Olympics.
