= James Cooke (sailor) =

Singaporean sailor

Personal information
- Full name: James Bryden Cooke
- Nationality: Singaporean
- Born: 27 February 1935 (age 91) Christchurch, New Zealand

Sport
- Sport: Sailing

James Bryden Cooke (born 27 February 1935) is a Singaporean sailor. He competed in the Dragon event at the 1960 Summer Olympics.
