= Gonzalo García (sailor) =

Uruguayan sailor

Personal information
- Born: 1 October 1935 (age 89); Montevideo, Uruguay

Sport
- Sport: Sailing

Gonzalo García (born 1 October 1935) is a Uruguayan sailor. He competed in the Dragon event at the 1960 Summer Olympics.
