= Alan Barrett (costume designer) =

British costume designer (1938–1991)

- Born: 17 March 1938; Wolverhampton
- Died: 26 August 1991 (aged 52–53); London
- Occupation: Costume designer
- Years active: 1967-1980

Alan Barrett (* 1938 in Wolverhampton – † 26 August 1991 in London) was a British costume designer who was nominated at the 49th Academy Awards for Best Costumes for the film The Seven-Per-Cent Solution.

== Life and work ==
Alan Barrett began his career as a costume designer in 1967 for John Schlesinger's award-winning historical drama Far From the Madding Crowd starring Julie Christie, Peter Finch and Alan Bates. Barrett developed the costumes for the film for 64 main actors and about 1600 extras. Barrett's work created "a muted palette of brown and grey, with startling flashes of Sergeant Troy's red tunic – almost an alien presence, deliberately discordant" against Julie Christie's "earth tones" and "virginal white lace dress". Barrett had commissioned the costumiers Nathans to create the vivid red uniform for Terence Stamp. For his work on John Schlesinger's film, Barrett was nominated for a BAFTA award for Best Costume Design - Colour.

In 1969, Barrett designed the costumes for Peter Coe's comedy Lock Up Your Daughters!, set in the 1700s and starring Christopher Plummer, Susannah York and Glynis Johns. This was followed by work for Bud Yorkin's film production Start the Revolution Without Me (1970) with Gene Wilder and Donald Sutherland, and Richard Lester's adventure film Royal Flash (1975) with Malcolm McDowell.

Barrett's costumes for the Arthur Conan Doyle adaptation The Seven Per Cent Solution (director Herbert Ross), received an Oscar nomination in the Best Costume Design category at the 1977 awards ceremony.

In 1979 Barrett contributed additional costumes for Schlesinger's war drama Yanks with actor Richard Gere. Shirley Russell was the main costume designer of the film. At the end of his film career, he supervised the music biography Nijinsky with George De La Pena in the title role as a costume designer for Herbert Ross in 1980.

Barrett died on 26 August 1991 in London.

== Awards ==
- 1968: British Academy Film Award nomination in the category Best Costumes – Color Film for Far From the Madding Crowd
- 1977: Oscar nomination in the category of Best Costume Design for The Seven-Per-Cent Solution

== Filmography ==
Cinema

- 1967: Far from the Madding Crowd
- 1969: Lock Up Your Daughters!
- 1970: Start the Revolution Without Me
- 1975: Royal Flash
- 1976: The Seven-Per-Cent Solution
- 1979: Yanks (Additional costumes)
- 1980: Nijinsky
