= Gerry Tuite =

Australian rules footballer, born 1910

Personal information
- Full name: Gerald James Tuite
- Born: 14 February 1910; West Melbourne, Victoria
- Died: 20 February 1990 (aged 80)
- Height: 179 cm (5 ft 10 in)
- Weight: 87 kg (192 lb)

Playing career^{1}
Years	Club	Games (Goals)
1929	North Melbourne	4 (0)
- ^{1} Playing statistics correct to the end of 1929.

Gerald James Tuite (14 February 1910 – 20 February 1990) was an Australian rules footballer who played with North Melbourne in the Victorian Football League (VFL).
