= David Ryder (sailor) =

Irish sailor

Personal information
- Nationality: Irish
- Born: 1 May 1934; Dublin, Ireland
- Died: 28 February 1985 (aged 50); Stratford, New Zealand

Sport
- Sport: Sailing

David Ryder (1 May 1934 – 28 February 1985) was an Irish sailor. He competed in the Dragon event at the 1960 Summer Olympics.
