= Ian Hannay =

British sailor

Ian Morton Hannay (born 23 August 1935) is a British sailor who competed in the 1960 Summer Olympics and in the 1972 Summer Olympics.
