= Gilbert Casalecchi =

Swiss sailor

Personal information
- Nationality: Swiss
- Born: 20 March 1908; Bologna, Italy
- Died: 26 February 1990 (aged 81)

Sport
- Sport: Sailing

Gilbert Casalecchi (20 March 1908 – 26 February 1990) was a Swiss sailor. He competed in the Dragon event at the 1960 Summer Olympics.
