= François Thierry-Mieg =

Free French intelligence officer

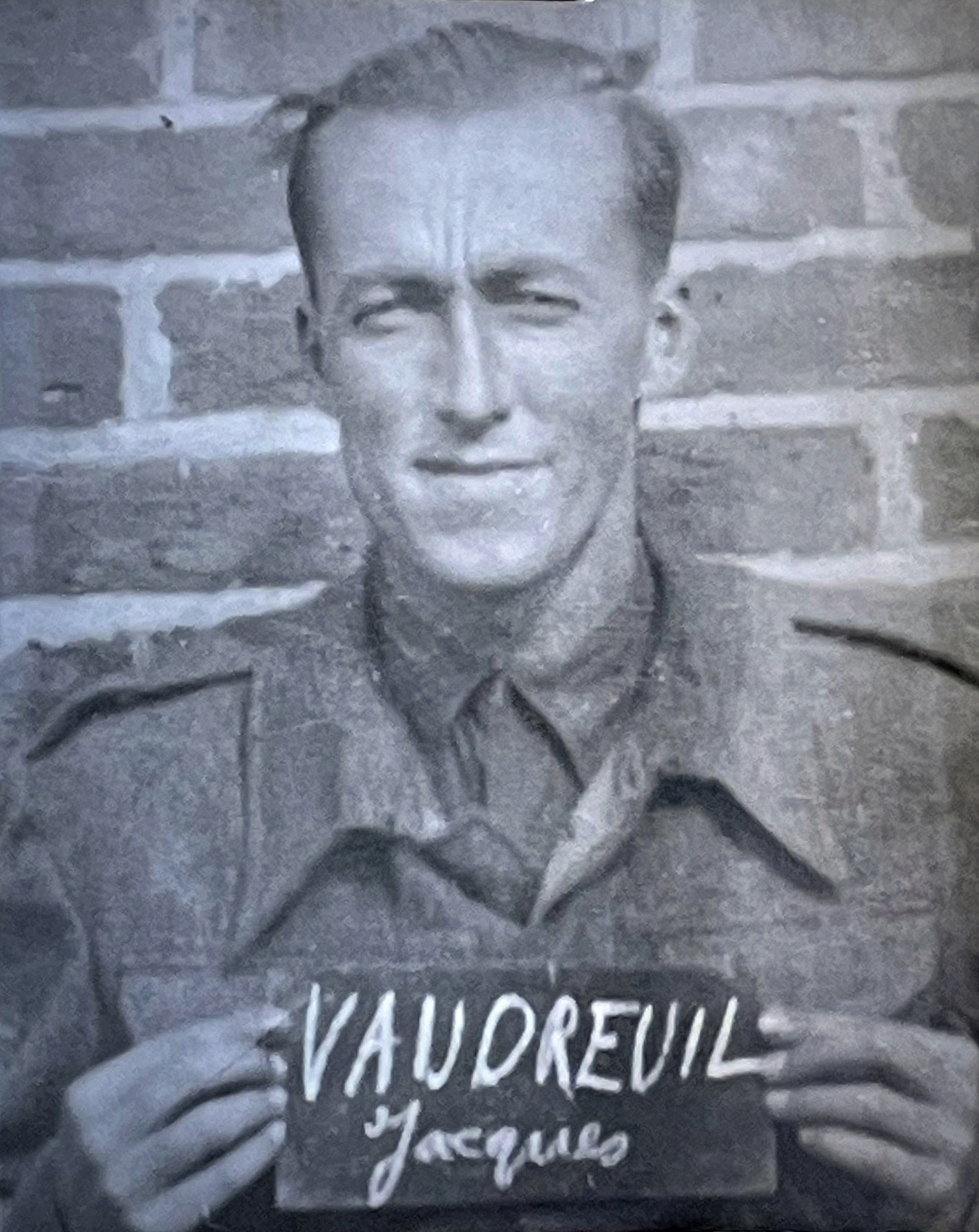
François Thierry-Mieg a.k.a. "Vaudreuil" on September 10, 1941

François Thierry-Mieg MBE (18 November 1908 – 30 September 1995) was a high-ranking member of Bureau Central de Renseignements et d'Action (BCRA), the Free French intelligence services during WWII.

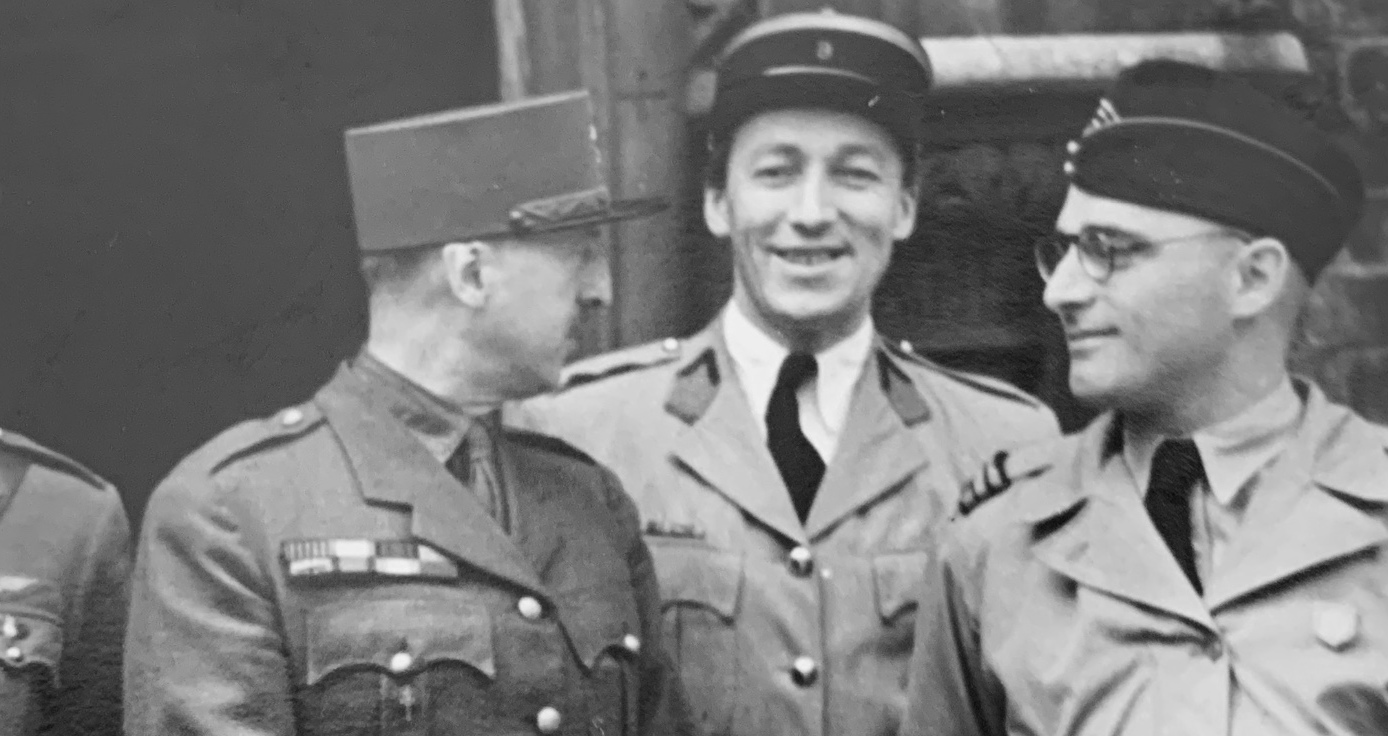
With General Koenig, chief of staff of the Free French Forces in early June 1944 (London)

After the outbreak of World War II, Thierry-Mieg fought in the Battle of France. He was captured by the Wehrmacht but managed to escape to the Soviet Union in January 1941. At the time, Joseph Stalin was still an ally of Hitler. François Thierry-Mieg was imprisoned for a few months in the NKVD prisons (Kaunas, Lubyanka).

After Nazi Germany invaded the Soviet Union in June 1941, he joined General de Gaulle and the Free French Forces in London. He was promoted to the rank of captain and took the code name of “Vaudreuil”. He was then appointed as head of the French Military Mission to Gibraltar, shortly before the Allied invasion of French North Africa ("Operation Torch”).

In 1943, François Thierry-Mieg was in charge of one of the intelligence units at Bureau Central de Renseignements et d'Action. He began to help organize the French Resistance movements and coordinate intelligence gathering and sabotage.

His mother Marcelle was a Resistance member herself and was arrested on 23 June 1943 by the Gestapo. She was transferred to Fresnes Prison, then to Ravensbrück concentration camp, where she died on 9 February 1945.

After the Battle of Normandy, Thierry-Mieg was attached to the 2nd Armored Division (France). Later in 1944, he served as one of Colonel Passy's deputy. He received the Medal of Freedom with bronze palm and the Resistance Medal After the war, Captain Thierry-Mieg became chief of staff to General Henri Riviere, the new head of Service de Documentation Extérieure et de Contre-Espionnage (1946-1951). He eventually retired from the army and became a businessman.

A distinguished sportsman, he competed in the Dragon event at the 1960 Summer Olympics.

His daughter Pascale married Sir Christopher Mallaby, British ambassador to Germany (1988-1992) and France (1993-1996).
