= Maurice Kelly (sailor) =

Bahamian sailor

Personal information
- Nationality: Bahamian
- Born: 2 October 1924 Nassau, Bahamas
- Died: 26 November 1989 (aged 65) Miami, Florida, United States

Sport
- Sport: Sailing

Achievements and titles
- Olympic finals: 1960 Summer Olympics

Maurice Kelly (2 October 1924 – 26 November 1989) was a Bahamian sailor. He competed in the Dragon event at the 1960 Summer Olympics.
