= Pierre Camoletti =

Swiss sailor

Personal information
- Nationality: Swiss
- Born: 11 May 1936; Geneva, Switzerland
- Died: 2010 (aged 73–74)

Sport
- Sport: Sailing

Pierre Camoletti (11 May 1936 – 2010) was a Swiss sailor. He competed in the Dragon event at the 1960 Summer Olympics.
