= John Halliday (cricketer) =

English cricketer

Personal information
- Full name: John Gordon Halliday
- Born: 4 July 1915; Cockermouth, Cumberland, England
- Died: 3 December 1945 (aged 30); Rochefort, Charente-Maritime, France
- Batting: Right-handed
- Bowling: Right-arm medium

Domestic team information
- Years: Team
- 1934–1937: Oxford University
- 1934: Minor Counties
- 1932–1939: Oxfordshire

Career statistics
Competition	First-class
Matches	26
Runs scored	848
Batting average	24.94
100s/50s	–/5
Top score	29
Balls bowled	1,509
Wickets	21
Bowling average	35.57
5 wickets in innings	–
10 wickets in match	–
Best bowling	3/11
Catches/stumpings	8/–
- Source: Cricinfo, 8 June 2014

John Gordon Halliday (4 July 1915 – 3 December 1945) was an English cricketer active in the 1930s. Born at Cockermouth, Cumberland, Halliday was a right-handed batsman and right-arm medium pace bowler who made over twenty appearances in first-class cricket.

== Life and career ==
Halliday was educated at the City of Oxford High School for Boys, where he excelled at cricket. He debuted for Oxfordshire in the 1932 Minor Counties Championship, and, while studying at Merton College, Oxford, made his debut in first-class cricket for the university cricket team in 1934 against Gloucestershire. Making five first-class appearances for the university in 1934, Halliday was also selected to play for the Minor Counties cricket team against Oxford University in that same year. He played first-class cricket for university until 1937, making a total of 25 appearances. Though unable to recapture his form as a schoolboy cricketer, Halliday nonetheless scored a total of 766 runs at an average of 23.21, making eight half centuries and top-scoring with 87. As a bowler, he took 18 wickets at an average of 37.66, with best figures of 3/11. Halliday's minor counties career with Oxfordshire continued until 1939, making sixty appearances. He was elected county captain in 1938.

Halliday served in the Royal Air Force during World War II, holding the rank of pilot officer in 1940, in the following year he became a flying officer. In June 1942 he was promoted to flight lieutenant, At some point after this Halliday became a wing commander. Following the end of the war, he remained with the Royal Air Force, serving with No. 59 Squadron. He was a passenger on board a B-24 Liberator on 3 December 1945, when it was struck by lightning and crashed near Rochefort in France, killing all 28 on board. He was buried at Rochefort-sur-Mer Naval Cemetery.
