= Far from the Madding Crowd (1967 film) =

1967 British epic period drama by John Schlesinger

- Theatrical release poster by Howard Terpning
- Directed by: John Schlesinger
- Screenplay by: Frederic Raphael
- Based on: Far from the Madding Crowd; 1874 novel by Thomas Hardy
- Produced by: Joseph Janni
- Starring: Julie Christie; Terence Stamp; Peter Finch; Alan Bates
- Cinematography: Nicolas Roeg
- Edited by: Malcolm Cooke
- Music by: Richard Rodney Bennett
- Production companies: Metro-Goldwyn-Mayer; Vic Films
- Distributed by: Warner-Pathé Distributors
- Release date: 16 October 1967 (United Kingdom)
- Running time: 170 minutes
- Country: United Kingdom
- Language: English
- Budget: $2.75 million
- Box office: $3.5 million (US/Canada)

Far from the Madding Crowd is a 1967 British epic period drama film directed by John Schlesinger and starring Julie Christie, Alan Bates, Terence Stamp and Peter Finch. The screenplay was by Frederic Raphael adapted from Thomas Hardy's 1874 novel of the same name. It was Schlesinger's fourth film (and his third collaboration with Christie). It marked a stylistic shift away from his earlier works exploring contemporary urban mores. Filmed in Panavision, it was the first 70 mm film to be shown on the 75-foot (23 m) screen in the all new Odeon Marble Arch, London. The cinematography was by Nicolas Roeg and the music was by Richard Rodney Bennett, who also used traditional folk songs in various scenes throughout the film.

== Plot ==
Set in the rural West Country in Victorian England in the mid-1860s, the story features Bathsheba Everdene, a headstrong, independently minded woman who inherits her uncle's farm and decides to manage it herself. This engenders some disapproval from the local farming community. She employs a former neighbour, Gabriel Oak, as a shepherd. Rejected by Bathsheba earlier as a suitor for lack of wealth, Gabriel lost his own flock after one of his dogs drove them off a cliff.

Bathsheba impulsively sends a valentine to William Boldwood, a nearby gentleman farmer. Boldwood, a middle-aged bachelor, falls passionately in love with her and proposes; Bathsheba promises to consider his offer. However, she soon meets and becomes enamoured of Frank Troy, a handsome sergeant, dashing in red uniform.

Troy was to marry young Fanny Robin, a maidservant pregnant with his child, but she went to the wrong church on their wedding day; a humiliated Troy petulantly refused to set another date for the ceremony and was then posted to a different town. Jealous at seeing Bathsheba become besotted with the handsome Troy, Boldwood offers him money to leave Bathsheba alone. Troy plays with Boldwood, rejecting increasing amounts before humiliating him by announcing that he and Bathsheba are already married. Troy proves a selfish and irresponsible husband while Bathsheba at first continues to adore him. At the Harvest Home Troy sends Bathsheba off to bed alone, while he gets drunk with all the farmhands except Gabriel; when a storm threatens their harvested haystacks, Gabriel, with Bathsheba's help, covers the ricks to avert disaster. Troy gambles away much of Bathsheba's money and creates disharmony among the farmhands. When Fanny comes to Troy, in an advanced state of pregnancy, to ask for his help, Troy says he will help her later. Upon learning that Fanny has died in childbirth, Bathsheba confronts Troy, who feels remorse over Fanny's death and swears cruelly that he loved only Fanny, not her. His clothes are later found by the sea, and he is presumed drowned.

Boldwood badgers Bathsheba to marry him. She will not commit to an engagement but promises she will not get engaged to anyone else until the end of the seven-year period before Troy can be declared legally dead. If Boldwood still wishes it, she will then marry him at that time. It is then revealed that Troy has become the star attraction in a troupe of actors, enacting the dramatic role of the highwayman Dick Turpin with a horse that performs tricks on cue. When the troupe comes to Weatherbury, Troy spots Boldwood and Bathsheba in the crowd and enhances his theatrical makeup to avoid recognition. Troy then reappears to reclaim his wife at a party which Boldwood is giving to impress Bathsheba. Boldwood shoots Troy dead. Still besotted by Troy, Bathsheba throws herself on his body and loudly repeats his name in despair while Boldwood looks on in horror.

Boldwood is last seen in a prison cell, awaiting execution. Gabriel tells Bathsheba that he is emigrating to the United States. Realising how much she needs his quiet strength and unselfish devotion, Bathsheba persuades Gabriel to remain in Weatherbury, which he agrees to do only on the condition that they marry. The last scene shows Gabriel, in gentleman's attire in the drawing room of their manorial home, with Bathsheba quietly reading the newspaper in his company. Above the fireplace is the elaborate automaton clock Troy had given Bathsheba as a wedding present: a castle with a soldier in red uniform on the tower playing his trumpet to announce the hour.

== Cast ==
- Julie Christie as Bathsheba Everdene
- Terence Stamp as Sergeant Frank Troy
- Peter Finch as William Boldwood
- Alan Bates as Gabriel Oak
- Fiona Walker as Liddy
- John Barrett as Joseph Poorgrass
- Denise Coffey as Soberness
- Freddie Jones as Cainy Ball
- Margaret Lacey as Maryann Money
- Alison Leggatt as Mrs. Hurst
- Pauline Melville as Mrs. Tall
- Andrew Robertson as Andrew Randle
- Brian Rawlinson as Matthew Moon
- Julian Somers as Jan Coggan
- Prunella Ransome as Fanny Robin
- Jonathan Newth as Gentleman at cockfight
- Peggy Ann Clifford as Fat lady at circus
- Bryan Mosley as Barker

== Production ==
Darling had been a huge critical and commercial success and MGM—which had turned down Darling—was interested in making a new film with the same team. The studio wanted a "roadshow" movie with a large budget. Schlesinger was originally going to make a version of Tess of the d'Urbervilles before deciding on Far from the Madding Crowd.

The budget was $3 million, 80% of which was provided by MGM, 20% by Anglo-Amalgamated. It was one of the most expensive films made by Anglo.

The film was shot largely on location in Dorset and Wiltshire.

According to Jim Clark, "John had problems with Terence Stamp" while making the movie. "He wasn't particularly keen on Terry's acting and their relationship wasn't good. He just could not drag the performance out of Stamp that he really wanted and it worried him terribly. He could be very cruel."

== Release ==
The film premiered on 16 October 1967 at the new Odeon Marble Arch, attended by Princess Margaret and Lord Snowdon. It was the first Panavision 70 mm film to be shown on the 75-foot (23 m) screen in the all new Odeon Marble Arch, London, which opened in February that year.

== Reception ==
=== Box office ===
The film performed well at the box office in the UK but was a commercial failure in the U.S.

Frederic Raphael later reflected, "It's a film I admire, and I think John did a very good job, since God knows he's hardly the stuff of sheep breeders, but it is a bit slow. I saw it in New York and didn't like it as much as when I saw it in London. One knew it was losing the audience. And then the Dorset accents were a problem. Americans simply did not relate to these kinds of country people."

=== Critical ===
The Monthly Film Bulletin wrote: "Despite the exquisite beauty and accuracy of Richard MacDonald's reconstructions of nineteenth century England, and despite the misty loveliness of Nicolas Roeg's colour photography, Far From The Madding Crowd fails (with the exception of Peter Finch's Boldwood, brilliantly suggesting all the barely suppressed violence that can lurk beneath a civilised exterior) to elevate its characters to the level of their surroundings. We are used, in the theatre if not in the cinema, to the sight of imposing characters acting out their passions against cardboard décors. But here the conventional theatrical effect is reversed, as cardboard characters appear dwarfed by the imposing reality of the natural scenery through which they move. Schlesinger's characters fail to grow, as Hardy's do, with experience: Alan Bates' Gabriel is endowed from the start with an uncanny self-confidence, while Bathsheba, as portrayed by Julie Christie, remains extroverted throughout."

Roger Ebert found the scenes of the rural area and rural life to be "splendid". His strongest criticism is that the film missed the point of the small society of rural life:

Thomas Hardy's novel told of a 19th-century rural England in which class distinctions and unyielding social codes surrounded his characters. They were far from the madding crowd whether they liked it or not, and got tangled in each other's problems because there was nowhere else to turn. It's not simply that Bathsheba (Julie Christie) was courted by the three men in her life, but that she was courted by ALL three men in her life.

The film received mixed to positive reviews from critics; the film holds a 64% rating on Rotten Tomatoes, based on 28 reviews.

== Awards ==
The film was nominated for one Oscar for Best Original Music Score and two BAFTAs, Best British Cinematography (Colour) and Best British Costume (Colour) (Alan Barrett).

Won:

- National Board of Review Award for Best Film
- National Board of Review Award for Best Actor (Peter Finch)

Nominated:

- Academy Award for Best Original Score
- Golden Globe Award for Best Motion Picture – Drama
- Golden Globe Award for Best Actor – Motion Picture Drama (Alan Bates)
- Golden Globe Award for Best Supporting Actress (Prunella Ransome)
- BAFTA Award for Best Cinematography
- BAFTA Award for Best Costume Design

== Legacy ==
=== Music ===
The Kinks song "Waterloo Sunset" (which is not used in the film) allegedly alluded to the film's star pairing, Terence Stamp and Julie Christie ("Terry and Julie"). However, this was denied by the song writer Ray Davies stating, "I think the characters have to do with the aspirations of my elder sisters, who grew up during the Second World War and missed out on the 60s. I was thinking of the world I wanted them to have."

== See also ==
- BFI Top 100 British films
