= Hans Ravenborg =

German sailor

Hans Ravenborg (5 April 1921 – 30 July 2008) was a German sailor who competed in the 1960 Summer Olympics.
