= Rod Leffanue =

Australian rules footballer, born 1913

Roderick Leffanue

Personal information
- Full name: Roderick Leffanue
- Nickname: Doc
- Born: 3 January 1913
- Died: 12 April 1991 (aged 78)
- Original team: Middle Park
- Height: 174 cm (5 ft 9 in)
- Weight: 67 kg (148 lb)

Playing career^{1}
Years	Club	Games (Goals)
1930–32	South Melbourne	12 (14)
1933	Carlton	9 (20)
Total		21 (34)
- ^{1} Playing statistics correct to the end of 1933.

Roderick Leffanue (3 January 1913 – 12 April 1991) was an Australian rules footballer who played with Carlton and South Melbourne in the Victorian Football League (VFL).
