= Marcel Thévenet =

French weightlifter

Personal information
- Nationality: French
- Born: 9 July 1915; Poitiers, France
- Died: 3 February 1990 (aged 74); Limoges, France

Sport
- Sport: Weightlifting

Marcel Fernand Thévenet (9 July 1915 – 3 February 1990) was a French weightlifter. He competed at the 1948 Summer Olympics and the 1952 Summer Olympics.
