= Joachim Hunger =

German sailor (1957–1990)

Personal information
- Nationality: German
- Born: 26 September 1957 Kiel, Germany
- Died: 9 February 1990 (aged 32) Berlin, Germany

Sport
- Sport: Sailing

Joachim Hunger (26 September 1957 – 9 February 1990) was a German sailor. He competed at the 1984 Summer Olympics and the 1988 Summer Olympics.
