= Alan Cain =

Australian sailor

Personal information
- Full name: Alan John Cain
- Nationality: Australian
- Born: 7 December 1922; Footscray, Victoria, Australia
- Died: 15 May 1998 (aged 75)

Sailing career
- Class: Dragon
- Club: Royal Melbourne Yacht Squadron

Alan John Cain (7 December 1922 – 15 May 1998) was an Australian sailor. He competed in the Dragon event at the 1960 Summer Olympics.
