= Antonio Ciciliano =

Italian sailor

Antonio Ciciliano (3 November 1932 – 4 September 2015) was an Italian competitive sailor and Olympic medalist. He won a bronze medal in the Dragon class at the 1960 Summer Olympics in Rome.
