= Jacq van den Berg =

Dutch sailor (born 1916)

Personal information
- Full name: Jacob Ralph van den Berg
- Nationality: Dutch
- Born: 19 December 1916 Birmingham, England
- Height: 1.80 m (5 ft 11 in)

Sport

Sailing career
- Class: Dragon

Jacob Ralph "Jacq" van den Berg (born 19 December 1916, date of death unknown) was a sailor from the Netherlands who represented his country at the 1960 Summer Olympics in Naples. He was born in Birmingham. Van den Berg, as crew on the Dutch Dragon, took the 13th place with helmsman Wim van Duyl and fellow crew member Biem Dudok van Heel. In the 1956 Olympics in Melbourne Van den Berg was the Dragon crew for the Dutch Olympic team. After the Soviet invasion in Hungary, however, the Dutch government decided that the Dutch Olympic team would not compete. Van den Berg is deceased.
