= Ned Holiday =

Singaporean sailor

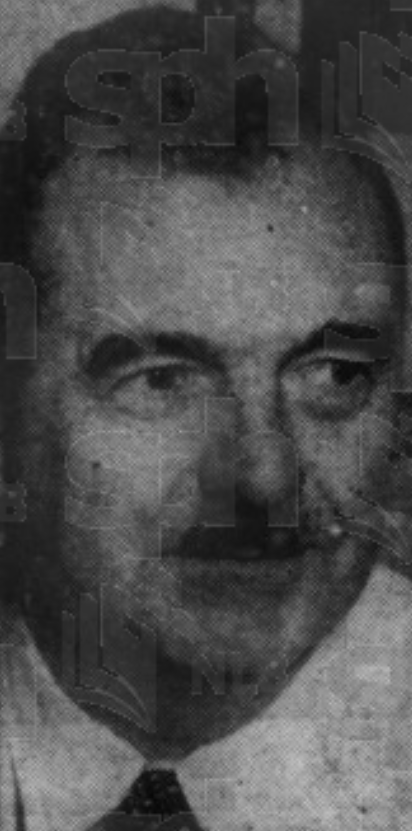
- Holiday in 1952

Personal information
- Nationality: Singaporean
- Born: 26 September 1900; Saint Peter Port, Guernsey
- Died: 24 December 1978 (aged 78); Guernsey

Sport
- Sport: Sailing

Edward Gilbert Holiday (26 September 1900 – 24 December 1978) was a Singaporean sailor and businessman. He competed at the 1956 Summer Olympics and the 1960 Summer Olympics.

Holiday came to Singapore in May 1919. He became an employee of the rubber broker firm Lewis & Peat (Singapore) Limited and later served as its chairman. In 1945, he was awarded the Efficiency Decoration. In 1950, he was appointed the chairman of the Singapore Chamber of Commerce Rubber Association. He was also a Justice of the Peace and the commodore of the Republic Of Singapore Yacht Club. In 1954, he left Lewis & Peat with fellow directors Vivian Bath and John Cutler, with whom he formed the firm Holiday, Cutler & Bath. Holiday retired and left Singapore in 1965. He died at his home in Guernsey on 24 December 1978.
