= Juan Mirangels =

Spanish sailor

Personal information
- Nationality: Spanish
- Born: 15 August 1916; Barcelona, Spain
- Died: 27 April 1991 (aged 74); Barcelona, Spain

Sport
- Sport: Sailing

Juan Mirangels (15 August 1916 – 27 April 1991) was a Spanish sailor. He competed in the Dragon event at the 1960 Summer Olympics.
