= Harold Thomsett =

Australian cricketer

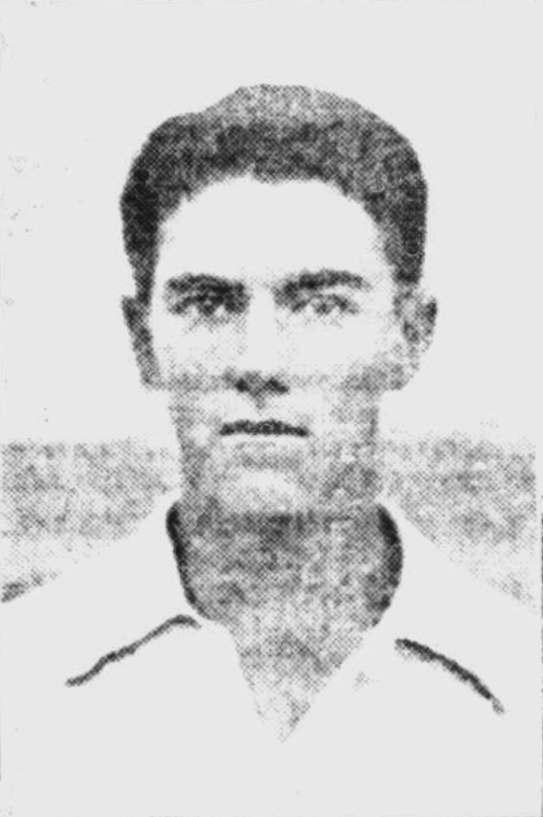

Personal information
- Born: 23 October 1913; Yarraman, Queensland, Australia
- Died: 12 April 1991 (aged 77); Brisbane, Queensland, Australia
- Source: Cricinfo, 8 October 2020

Harold Thomsett (23 October 1913 – 12 April 1991) was an Australian cricketer. He played in two first-class matches for Queensland in 1935/36.

== See also ==
- List of Queensland first-class cricketers
