= Göran Crafoord =

Swedish sailor (born 1939)

Göran Crafoord (born 27 March 1939) is a Swedish former sailor who competed in the 1960 Summer Olympics.
