= Charlie McKinley =

Australian rules footballer, born 1903

Personal information
- Full name: Charles McKinley
- Born: 26 October 1903
- Died: 27 February 1990 (aged 86)
- Height: 184 cm (6 ft 0 in)
- Weight: 83 kg (183 lb)

Playing career^{1}
Years	Club	Games (Goals)
1928	Fitzroy	1 (0)
- ^{1} Playing statistics correct to the end of 1928.

Charlie McKinley (26 October 1903 – 27 February 1990) was an Australian rules footballer who played with Fitzroy in the Victorian Football League (VFL).
