= Lynn Watters =

Canadian sailor

Lynn Alexander Watters (20 November 1916 in Montreal – 25 December 2012) was a Canadian sailor who competed in the 1960 Summer Olympics and in the 1964 Summer Olympics.
