= Sandy MacDonald (sailor) =

Canadian sailor

Samuel Alexander MacDonald (September 7, 1904 – October 21, 2003) was a Canadian sailor who competed in the 1960 Summer Olympics and in the 1964 Summer Olympics. He was born in Charlottetown, Prince Edward Island.

In 1974, Sandy MacDonald was inducted into the PEI Sports Hall of Fame.
