= List of flag bearers for Venezuela at the Olympics =

Venezuela at the Olympics
- IOC code: VEN
- NOC: Venezuelan Olympic Committee
- Website: cov.com.ve (in Spanish)
- Medals: Gold 3 Silver 7 Bronze 9 Total 19

Summer appearances
- 1948; 1952; 1956; 1960; 1964; 1968; 1972; 1976; 1980; 1984; 1988; 1992; 1996; 2000; 2004; 2008; 2012; 2016; 2020; 2024

Winter appearances
- 1998; 2002; 2006; 2010; 2014; 2018–2022; 2026

This is a list of flag bearers who have represented Venezuela at the Olympics.

Flag bearers carry the national flag of their country at the opening ceremony of the Olympic Games.

#	Event year	Season	Flag bearer	Sport
1	1948	Summer	Julio César León	Cycling
2	1952	Summer	Asnoldo Devonish	Athletics
3	1956	Summer	Rafael Romero	Athletics
4	1960	Summer	Rafael Romero	Athletics
5	1964	Summer	Téodoro Capriles	Swimming
6	1968	Summer	Silvio Fernández	Fencing
7	1972	Summer	Francisco Rodríguez	Boxing
8	1976	Summer	Manuel Luna	Judo
9	1980	Summer	Antonio Esparragoza	Boxing
10	1984	Summer	William Wuycke	Athletics
11	1988	Summer	Elizabeth Popper	Table tennis
12	1992	Summer	María Elena Giusti	Swimming
13	1996	Summer	Francisco Sánchez	Swimming
14	1998	Winter	Iginia Boccalandro	Luge
15	2000	Summer	Adriana Carmona	Taekwondo
16	2002	Winter	Iginia Boccalandro	Luge
17	2004	Summer	Julio Luna	Weightlifting
18	2006	Winter	Werner Hoeger	Luge
19	2008	Summer	María Soto	Softball
20	2012	Summer	Fabiola Ramos	Table tennis
21	2014	Winter	Antonio José Pardo Andretta	Alpine skiing
22	2016	Summer	Rubén Limardo	Fencing
23	2020	Summer	Antonio Díaz (Note: At both the opening and closing ceremonies.)	Karate
–	2020	Summer	Yulimar Rojas (Note: Yulimar Rojas was selected and set to be flag bearer with Díaz, but was not at the opening ceremony. Karen León walked alongside Díaz at the opening ceremony, but did not carry the flag, and Díaz was named as the nation's only opening flagbearer in a later interview. León remains listed as co-flagbearer with Díaz in the IOC list.)	Athletics
24	2024	Summer	Anriquelis Barrios	Judo
24	2024	Summer	Julio Mayora	Weightlifting
25	2026	Winter	Nicolas Claveau-Laviolette	Cross-country skiing

== See also ==
- Venezuela at the Olympics
