= Venezuela at the 2002 Winter Olympics =

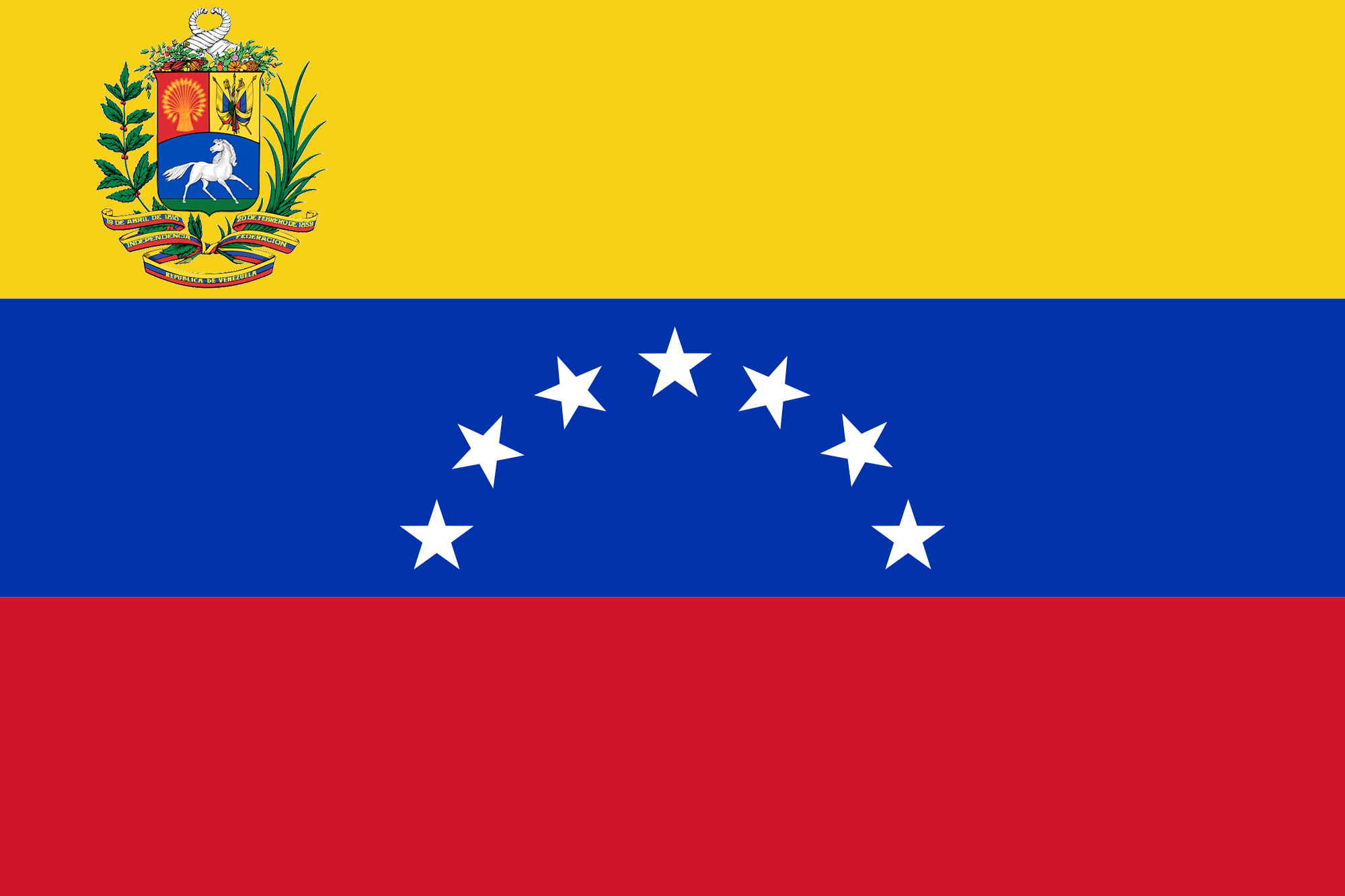
- IOC code: VEN
- NOC: Venezuelan Olympic Committee
- Website: cov.com.ve (in Spanish)

in Salt Lake City
- Competitors: 4 (3 men and 1 woman) in 1 sport
- Flag bearer: Iginia Boccalandro
- Medals: Gold 0 Silver 0 Bronze 0 Total 0

Winter Olympics appearances (overview)
- 1998; 2002; 2006; 2010; 2014; 2018–2022; 2026

Venezuela competed at the 2002 Winter Olympics in Salt Lake City, United States.

== Luge ==
Men

Athlete	Run 1		Run 2		Run 3		Run 4		Total	
Athlete	Time	Rank	Time	Rank	Time	Rank	Time	Rank	Time	Rank
Werner Hoeger	47.234	43	47.071	40	46.934	42	47.039	41	3:08.278	40
Julio César Camacho	47.193	41	46.676	37	47.627	43	46.579	39	3:08.075	39
Chris Hoeger	46.167	31	46.097	33	45.818	32	46.231	32	3:04.313	31

Women

Athlete	Run 1		Run 2		Run 3		Run 4		Total	
Athlete	Time	Rank	Time	Rank	Time	Rank	Time	Rank	Time	Rank
Iginia Boccalandro	DNF	–	–	–	–	–	–	–	DNF	–
