= Luge at the 2002 Winter Olympics – Men's singles =

Men's singles at the XIX Olympic Winter Games
- Pictogram for luge
- Venue: Utah Olympic Park
- Dates: 10–11 February 2002
- Competitors: 50 from 23 nations

Medalists
1st place, gold medalist(s)		Armin Zöggeler	Italy
2nd place, silver medalist(s)		Georg Hackl	Germany
3rd place, bronze medalist(s)		Markus Prock	Austria

The men's luge at the 2002 Winter Olympics began on 10 February, and was completed on 11 February at Utah Olympic Park.

== Results ==
The men's singles luge event was run over two days, with the first two runs on 10 February, and the second two runs on 11 February. The total time was the combined time of all four runs. Hackl's fifth medal in a row, but not fourth gold in a row. He becomes the first person to win 5 medals in one event in either the summer or winter games. Zöggeler's gold gave him a complete set of medals at the Winter Olympics.

Place	Athlete	Country	Run 1	Run 2	Run 3	Run 4	Total	Behind
Gold medal	Armin Zöggeler	Italy	44.546	44.521	44.296	44.578	2:57.941	—
Silver medal	Georg Hackl	Germany	44.614	44.494	44.487	44.675	2:58.270	+0.329
Bronze medal	Markus Prock	Austria	44.698	44.640	44.271	44.674	2:58.283	+0.342
4	Adam Heidt	United States	44.660	44.750	44.421	44.775	2:58.606	+0.665
5	Albert Demtschenko	Russia	44.756	44.732	44.534	44.974	2:58.996	+1.055
6	Karsten Albert	Germany	44.718	44.767	44.467	45.094	2:59.046	+1.105
7	Denis Geppert	Germany	44.846	44.874	44.417	45.017	2:59.154	+1.213
8	Markus Kleinheinz	Austria	44.875	44.857	44.558	44.921	2:59.211	+1.270
9	Wilfried Huber	Italy	44.851	44.814	44.611	45.043	2:59.319	+1.378
10	Reiner Margreiter	Austria	45.034	45.076	44.626	44.901	2:59.637	+1.696
11	Kyle Connelly	Canada	44.945	44.922	44.712	45.144	2:59.723	+1.782
12	Reinhold Rainer	Italy	44.927	44.801	44.814	45.212	2:59.754	+1.813
13	Stefan Höhener	Switzerland	45.101	45.254	44.534	44.911	2:59.800	+1.859
14	Chris Moffat	Canada	45.116	45.145	44.651	45.088	3:00.000	+2.059
15	Johan Rousseau	France	44.999	45.025	44.766	45.243	3:00.033	+2.092
16	Jaroslav Slavík	Slovakia	45.104	45.017	44.762	45.180	3:00.063	+2.122
17	Tony Benshoof	United States	44.776	45.653	44.787	44.886	3:00.102	+2.161
18	Yann Fricheteau	France	45.240	45.009	44.869	45.060	3:00.178	+2.237
19	Tyler Seitz	Canada	45.051	45.169	44.756	45.245	3:00.221	+2.280
20	Viktor Kneib	Russia	45.333	45.034	44.796	45.102	3:00.265	+2.324
21	Aleksey Gorlachov	Russia	45.156	45.131	45.010	45.271	3:00.568	+2.627
22	Nauris Skraustiņš	Latvia	45.335	45.389	44.904	45.061	3:00.689	+2.748
23	Bengt Walden	Sweden	45.455	45.189	45.081	45.561	3:01.286	+3.345
24	Reto Gilly	Switzerland	46.220	45.053	45.079	44.959	3:01.311	+3.370
25	Mark Hatton	Great Britain	45.391	45.509	45.107	45.559	3:01.566	+3.625
26	Nick Sullivan	United States	45.439	45.309	45.726	45.619	3:02.093	+4.152
27	Shigeaki Ushijima	Japan	45.905	45.260	45.283	45.651	3:02.099	+4.158
28	Anders Söderberg	Sweden	46.624	45.228	45.064	45.298	3:02.214	+4.273
29	Guntis Rēķis	Latvia	45.898	45.644	45.446	45.716	3:02.704	+4.763
30	Michal Kvicala	Czech Republic	46.659	45.932	46.001	45.681	3:04.273	+6.332
31	Christopher Hoeger	Venezuela	46.167	46.097	45.818	46.231	3:04.313	+6.372
32	Cristian Stanciu	Romania	46.176	46.203	46.080	46.155	3:04.614	+6.673
33	Shiva Keshavan	India	45.881	45.977	46.700	46.425	3:04.983	+7.042
34	Marian Tican	Romania	46.486	46.346	46.115	46.352	3:05.299	+7.358
35	Ľubomír Mick	Slovakia	47.207	46.333	45.803	46.475	3:05.818	+7.877
36	Lee Hak-jin	South Korea	46.942	47.245	46.558	46.454	3:07.199	+9.258
37	Patrick Singleton	Bermuda	47.015	48.690	45.769	46.298	3:07.772	+9.831
38	Constantin-Liviu Cepoi	Moldova	47.161	47.353	46.604	46.825	3:07.943	+10.002
39	Julio Cesar Camacho	Venezuela	47.193	46.676	47.627	46.579	3:08.075	+10.134
40	Werner Hoeger	Venezuela	47.234	47.071	46.934	47.039	3:08.278	+10.337
41	Rubén González	Argentina	48.180	47.819	48.533	48.276	3:12.808	+14.867
42	Kim Min-Kyu	South Korea	46.159	47.656	47.800	52.190	3:13.805	+15.864
43	Marcelo Gonzalez	Argentina	47.314	46.931	46.883	53.431	3:14.559	+16.618
44	Eugen Radu	Romania	56.608	46.096	46.299	46.324	3:15.327	+17.386
45	Ricardo Raschini	Brazil	46.309	46.977	46.464	56.897	3:16.647	+18.706
46	Renato Mizoguchi	Brazil	47.773	50.036	53.349	48.742	3:19.900	+21.959
47	Lin Chui-bin	Chinese Taipei	49.602	50.328	52.277	51.509	3:23.716	+25.775
48	Li Chia-hsun	Chinese Taipei	55.390	49.092	51.888	49.616	3:25.986	+28.045
	Lee Chang-yong	South Korea	DNF					
	Mārtiņš Rubenis	Latvia	45.022	49.671	DNS			
