= Marcelo González =

Marcelo González may refer to:

- Marcelo González Martín (1918-2004), Cardinal of the Roman Catholic Church
- Marcelo González (luger) (born 1965), Argentine luger
- Marcelo González Godoy (born 1963), Chilean association football commentator
