= Luge at the 1994 Winter Olympics – Men's singles =

Men's singles at the XVII Olympic Winter Games
- Venue: Lillehammer Olympic Bobsleigh and Luge Track
- Dates: 13–14 February 1994
- Competitors: 33 from 18 nations
- Winning time: 3:21.571

Medalists
| 1st place, gold medalist(s) | | Georg Hackl | Germany |
| 2nd place, silver medalist(s) | | Markus Prock | Austria |
| 3rd place, bronze medalist(s) | | Armin Zöggeler | Italy |

The men's singles luge competition at the 1994 Winter Olympics in Lillehammer was held on 13 and 14 February, at Lillehammer Olympic Bobsleigh and Luge Track.

== Results ==
| Rank | Bib | Athlete | Country | Run 1 | Run 2 | Run 3 | Run 4 | Total | Behind |
|---|---|---|---|---|---|---|---|---|---|
| 1st place, gold medalist(s) | 1 | Georg Hackl | Germany | 50.296 | 50.560 | 50.224 | 50.491 | 3:21.571 | – |
| 2nd place, silver medalist(s) | 5 | Markus Prock | Austria | 50.300 | 50.566 | 50.166 | 50.552 | 3:21.584 | +0.013 |
| 3rd place, bronze medalist(s) | 7 | Armin Zöggeler | Italy | 50.441 | 50.601 | 50.365 | 50.426 | 3:21.833 | +0.262 |
| 4 | 11 | Arnold Huber | Italy | 50.558 | 50.763 | 50.546 | 50.551 | 3:22.418 | +0.847 |
| 5 | 10 | Wendel Suckow | United States | 50.698 | 50.819 | 50.359 | 50.548 | 3:22.424 | +0.853 |
| 6 | 20 | Norbert Huber | Italy | 50.659 | 50.836 | 50.399 | 50.580 | 3:22.474 | +0.903 |
| 7 | 15 | Gerhard Gleirscher | Austria | 50.857 | 50.811 | 50.352 | 50.549 | 3:22.569 | +0.998 |
| 8 | 8 | Jens Müller | Germany | 50.563 | 50.858 | 50.297 | 50.862 | 3:22.580 | +1.009 |
| 9 | 6 | Albert Demchenko | Russia | 50.601 | 50.863 | 50.633 | 50.530 | 3:22.627 | +1.056 |
| 10 | 3 | Markus Schmidt | Austria | 50.664 | 50.870 | 50.750 | 50.830 | 3:23.114 | +1.543 |
| 11 | 4 | Sergey Danilin | Russia | 50.767 | 50.973 | 50.665 | 50.856 | 3:23.261 | +1.690 |
| 12 | 2 | Mikael Holm | Sweden | 50.917 | 51.087 | 50.946 | 51.099 | 3:24.049 | +2.478 |
| 13 | 13 | Anders Söderberg | Sweden | 51.111 | 51.197 | 50.809 | 50.982 | 3:24.099 | +2.528 |
| 14 | 17 | Eduard Burmistrov | Russia | 51.102 | 51.351 | 50.877 | 51.063 | 3:24.393 | +2.822 |
| 15 | 21 | Alexander Bau | Germany | 51.020 | 51.078 | 50.885 | 51.430 | 3:24.413 | +2.842 |
| 16 | 14 | Robert Pipkins | United States | 51.248 | 51.332 | 50.885 | 51.115 | 3:24.580 | +3.009 |
| 17 | 19 | Bengt Walden | Sweden | 51.331 | 51.325 | 51.091 | 51.105 | 3:24.852 | +3.281 |
| 18 | 9 | Agris Elerts | Latvia | 51.395 | 51.777 | 51.237 | 51.584 | 3:25.993 | +4.422 |
| 19 | 26 | Jozef Škvarek | Slovakia | 51.775 | 51.835 | 51.300 | 51.612 | 3:26.522 | +4.951 |
| 20 | 18 | Clay Ives | Canada | 51.518 | 51.822 | 51.699 | 51.647 | 3:26.686 | +5.115 |
| 21 | 16 | Juris Vovčoks | Latvia | 51.647 | 51.794 | 51.769 | 51.738 | 3:26.948 | +5.377 |
| 22 | 23 | Kazuhiko Takamatsu | Japan | 51.658 | 51.471 | 51.782 | 52.192 | 3:27.103 | +5.532 |
| 23 | 28 | Kyle Heikkila | Virgin Islands | 52.007 | 52.007 | 51.519 | 51.703 | 3:27.236 | +5.665 |
| 24 | 27 | Spyros Pinas | Greece | 51.996 | 52.170 | 51.782 | 51.864 | 3:27.812 | +6.241 |
| 25 | 24 | Yuji Sasaki | Japan | 51.970 | 52.279 | 52.286 | 51.943 | 3:28.478 | +6.907 |
| 26 | 29 | Paul Hix | Great Britain | 52.410 | 52.398 | 52.073 | 52.234 | 3:29.115 | +7.544 |
| 27 | 25 | Marco Felder | Liechtenstein | 52.279 | 52.445 | 52.122 | 52.563 | 3:29.409 | +7.838 |
| 28 | 31 | Atsushi Sasaki | Japan | 52.460 | 52.661 | 52.241 | 52.434 | 3:29.796 | +8.225 |
| 29 | 22 | Reto Gilly | Switzerland | 52.740 | 52.555 | 52.696 | 52.436 | 3:30.427 | +8.856 |
| 30 | 33 | Simon Payne | Bermuda | 52.606 | 52.855 | 52.543 | 52.633 | 3:30.637 | +9.066 |
| 31 | 32 | Nedžad Lomigora | Bosnia and Herzegovina | 53.254 | 53.126 | 54.725 | 53.023 | 3:34.128 | +12.557 |
| 32 | 30 | Roger White | Australia | 55.674 | 54.546 | 54.842 | 58.000 | 3:43.062 | +21.491 |
| | 12 | Duncan Kennedy | United States | 50.587 | 50.633 | DNF | – | – | – |
