= U.S. National Cross-Country Ski Championships =

Annual national cross-country skiing competition

- Status: Active
- Genre: Cross-Country Skiing national championships
- Date: Varying
- Frequency: Annual
- Country: United States
- Inaugurated: 1921
- Founder: Lake Placid Club
- Previous event: Lake Placid 2025
- Organiser: U.S. Ski & Snowboard

The U.S. National Cross-Country Ski Championships are an annual national cross-country skiing competition. The results are frequently used to determine members of the United States Ski Team for competitions such as the Winter Olympic Games and Scandinavian Cup.

== History ==
The National Ski Association of America, now U.S. Ski & Snowboard, was founded in Ishpeming, Michigan in 1905. The competition was first held in Lake Placid in conjunction with the Lake Placid Club, which would later go on to host the Olympic Games in 1932 and 1980.

In 1969, women raced for the first time.

In 1986, disabled competitors raced for the first time.

In 2021, the competition, originally slated to be held in Houghton, was cancelled due to the COVID-19 pandemic.

The Championships are scheduled to be held as Period 2 of the US SuperTour for 2026. If any remaining quotas for the 2026 Winter Olympics are open, it will function as a de facto Olympic trial, as with the previous Olympic Games.

== Divisions ==
- New England
- Alaska
- Intermountain
- Pacific Northwest
- Rocky Mountain
- Great Lakes
- Far West
- Midwest
- High Plains
- Mid-Atlantic

== Editions ==
Edition	Year	City	State	Date	Venue	Events	Athletes	Reference
1	1921	Lake Placid	New York		Mount Van Hoevenberg			
12	1932	Lake Placid	New York		Mount Van Hoevenberg			
28	1948	Lake Placid	New York		Mount Van Hoevenberg			
36	1956	Lake Placid	New York		Mount Van Hoevenberg			
87	2007	Houghton	Michigan	January 3	Michigan Technological University			
95	2015	Houghton	Michigan		Michigan Technological University			
96	2016	Houghton	Michigan	January 3–9	Michigan Technological University		300+	
97	2017	Midway	Utah	January 7–12	Soldier Hollow			
98	2018	Anchorage	Alaska	January 2–9	Kincaid Park			
99	2019	Craftsbury	Vermont	January 3–8	Craftsbury Outdoor Center	10		
100	2020	Houghton	Michigan	January 2–7	Michigan Technological University			
101	2021	cancelled due to COVID-19 pandemic						
102	2022	Midway	Utah	January 2–7	Soldier Hollow		470+	
103	2023	Houghton	Michigan	January 2–7	Michigan Technological University		475	
104	2024	Midway	Utah	January 1–7	Soldier Hollow	8		
105	2025	Lake Placid	New York	March 26–30	Mount Van Hoevenberg	10		
106	2026	Lake Placid	New York	January 4–9	Mount Van Hoevenberg	8		
