= Bermuda at the 1994 Winter Olympics =

- IOC code: BER
- NOC: Bermuda Olympic Association
- Website: www.olympics.bm

in Lillehammer
- Competitors: 1 in 1 sport
- Flag bearer: John Hoskins
- Medals: Gold 0 Silver 0 Bronze 0 Total 0

Winter Olympics appearances (overview)
- 1992; 1994; 1998; 2002; 2006; 2010; 2014; 2018; 2022–2026

Bermuda sent a delegation to compete at the 1994 Winter Olympics in Lillehammer, Norway, from 12–27 February 1994. This was the territory's second appearance in a Winter Olympic Games following their debut in the 1992 Albertville Olympics. The only Bermudian athlete was luge racer Simon Payne. In the men's singles, he came in 30th place.

== Background ==
Bermuda first participated in Olympic competition at the 1936 Berlin Summer Games. The territory made their Winter Olympic Games debut in 1992 at the Albertville Games, and have appeared in every Olympics since their respective debuts bar one, the boycotted 1980 Summer Olympics in Moscow. The only medal the territory has won so far is a bronze in the sport of boxing at the 1976 Summer Olympics in Montreal. The 1994 Winter Olympics were held from 12–27 February 1994; a total of 1,737 athletes representing 67 National Olympic Committees took part. Lillehammer was the territory's second appearance at a Winter Olympics. Simon Payne was the only athlete Bermuda sent to Lillehammer, just as he had been the only athlete sent to Albertville two years prior. John Hoskins, who would later be president of the Bermuda Olympic Association, served as the flagbearer for the opening ceremony.

== Competitors ==
The following is the list of number of competitors in the Games.

Sport	Men	Women	Total
Luge	1	0	1
Total	1	0	1

== Luge ==
Simon Payne was 29 years old at the time of the Lillehammer Olympics, and was making his second Olympic appearance. Payne was one of the founders of the Bermuda luge federation, and was the first Winter Olympian from the territory. He had raced the men's singles in Albertville, where he finished in 30th place. In Lillehammer, the men's singles competition was held on 13–14 February, with two runs being held on each day; the sum of an athlete's four run times determined the final rankings. On 13 February, Payne posted run times of 52.606 seconds and 52.855 seconds. Overnight he was in 31st place out of 33 competitors. The next day, he finished the third run in 52.543 seconds and the fourth in 52.633 seconds. This meant he had a total time of 3 minutes and 30.637 seconds, which put him in 30th position. The gold medal was won by Germany's Georg Hackl in a time of 3 minutes and 21.571 seconds; the silver medal was earned by Markus Prock of Austria, and the bronze was taken by Italian Armin Zöggeler.

Athlete	Event	Run 1		Run 2		Run 3		Run 4		Total	
Athlete	Event	Time	Rank	Time	Rank	Time	Rank	Time	Rank	Time	Rank
Simon Payne	Men's singles	52.606	30	52.855	31	52.543	29	52.633	30	3:30.637	30
