= Venezuela at the 2006 Winter Olympics =

- IOC code: VEN
- NOC: Venezuelan Olympic Committee
- Website: cov.com.ve (in Spanish)

in Turin
- Competitors: 1 (1 man) in 1 sport
- Flag bearers: Werner Hoeger (opening and closing)
- Medals: Gold 0 Silver 0 Bronze 0 Total 0

Winter Olympics appearances (overview)
- 1998; 2002; 2006; 2010; 2014; 2018–2022; 2026

Venezuela sent a delegation to compete at the 2006 Winter Olympics in Turin, Italy from 10 to 26 February 2006. This was the third time Venezuela had competed at a Winter Olympic Games. The Venezuelan delegation consisted of one luge athlete, Werner Hoeger. He finished 32nd in his only event, the men's singles.

== Background ==
Venezuela joined Olympic competition at the 1948 Summer Olympics and has participated in every Summer Olympic Games since then. They first participated in the Winter Olympic Games in 1998 in Nagano, and were making their third Winter Olympic appearance here in Turin. The Venezuelan delegation to Turin consisted of one luger, Werner Hoeger. Luge was the only sport that Venezuela had ever entered athletes into in their Winter Olympics history. Hoegar was the flag bearer for the opening ceremony and the closing ceremony.

== Luge ==
Werner Hoeger, was 52 years old at the time of the Turin Olympics, and was serving as a kinesiology professor at Boise State University in the United States. He had previously competed for Venezuela at the 2002 Winter Olympics. The men's singles event was held from 11 to 12 February, with two runs held on each day, and final standing based on the sum of an athlete's times from all four runs. On 11 February Hoeger posted times of 56.754 seconds and 55.411 seconds. His first day combined time of 1 minute and 52 seconds had him in 35th place. On the second day, he posted times of 56.256 seconds and 55.169 seconds. With a combined time of 3 minutes and 43 seconds, he finished the event in 32nd place out of 35 competitors who finished all four runs.

Athlete	Event	Final					
Athlete	Event	Run 1	Run 2	Run 3	Run 4	Total	Rank
Werner Hoeger	Men's singles	56.754	55.411	56.256	55.169	3:43.590	32
