= Bermuda at the 1992 Winter Olympics =

Participant in '92 Olympic Games

- IOC code: BER
- NOC: Bermuda Olympic Association
- Website: www.olympics.bm

in Albertville
- Competitors: 1 (man) in 1 sport
- Flag bearer: John Hoskins
- Medals: Gold 0 Silver 0 Bronze 0 Total 0

Winter Olympics appearances (overview)
- 1992; 1994; 1998; 2002; 2006; 2010; 2014; 2018; 2022–2026

Bermuda competed in the Winter Olympic Games for the first time at the 1992 Winter Olympics in Albertville, France, represented by a single athlete. Simon Payne became the first person to represent Bermuda at the Winter Olympics, and later founded the Bermuda Luge Federation.

== Competitors ==
The following is the list of number of competitors in the Games.

Sport	Men	Women	Total
Luge	1	0	1
Total	1	0	1

== Luge ==
Men

Athlete	Run 1		Run 2		Run 3		Run 4		Total	
Athlete	Time	Rank	Time	Rank	Time	Rank	Time	Rank	Time	Rank
Simon Payne	47.741	31	47.517	31	47.942	29	47.973	29	3:11.173	29
