= Venezuela at the 2028 Summer Olympics =

- IOC code: VEN
- NOC: Venezuelan Olympic Committee
- Website: cov.com.ve (in Spanish)

in Los Angeles, United States 11 July 2028 – 30 July 2028
- Competitors: 24 in 1 sport
- Medals: Gold 0 Silver 0 Bronze 0 Total 0

Summer Olympics appearances (overview)
- 1948; 1952; 1956; 1960; 1964; 1968; 1972; 1976; 1980; 1984; 1988; 1992; 1996; 2000; 2004; 2008; 2012; 2016; 2020; 2024; 2028

Venezuela is scheduled to compete at the 2028 Summer Olympics in Los Angeles, from 14 to 30 July 2028. It will be the nation's thirteenth consecutive appearance at the Summer Olympics since its debut at the 1948 Summer Olympics.

== Competitors ==
The following is the list of number of competitors in the Games.

Sport	Men	Women	Total
Baseball	24	0	24
Total	24	0	24

== Baseball ==
Venezuela national baseball team secured an Olympic berth after claiming the gold medal and finishing as the highest-ranked eligible nations from the Americas at the 2026 World Baseball Classic.

Summary

Team	Event	Group stage			Round 1	Repechage 1	Round 2	Repechage 2	Semifinals	Final / BM	
Team	Event	Opposition Result	Opposition Result	Rank	Opposition Result	Opposition Result	Opposition Result	Opposition Result	Opposition Result	Opposition Result	Rank
Venezuela men's	Men's tournament										
