= Paul Hicks =

Paul Hicks may refer to:

- Paul Hicks (rugby league) (born 1977), rugby league footballer
- Paul Hicks (musician) (fl. 1990s–2010s), musician, engineer and mixer

== See also ==
- Paul Hix (born 1974), British luger
