= Kvíčala =

Kvíčala (feminine: Kvíčalová) is a Czech surname. Notable people with the surname include:

- Jan Kvicala (1868–1939), Czech chess player
- Petr Kvíčala (born 1960), Czech painter
- Matěj Kvíčala (born 1989), Czech luger
- Michal Kvíčala (born 1981), Czech luger

== See also ==
- 29476 Kvíčala, a main-belt asteroid
