= Venezuela at the 1998 Winter Olympics =

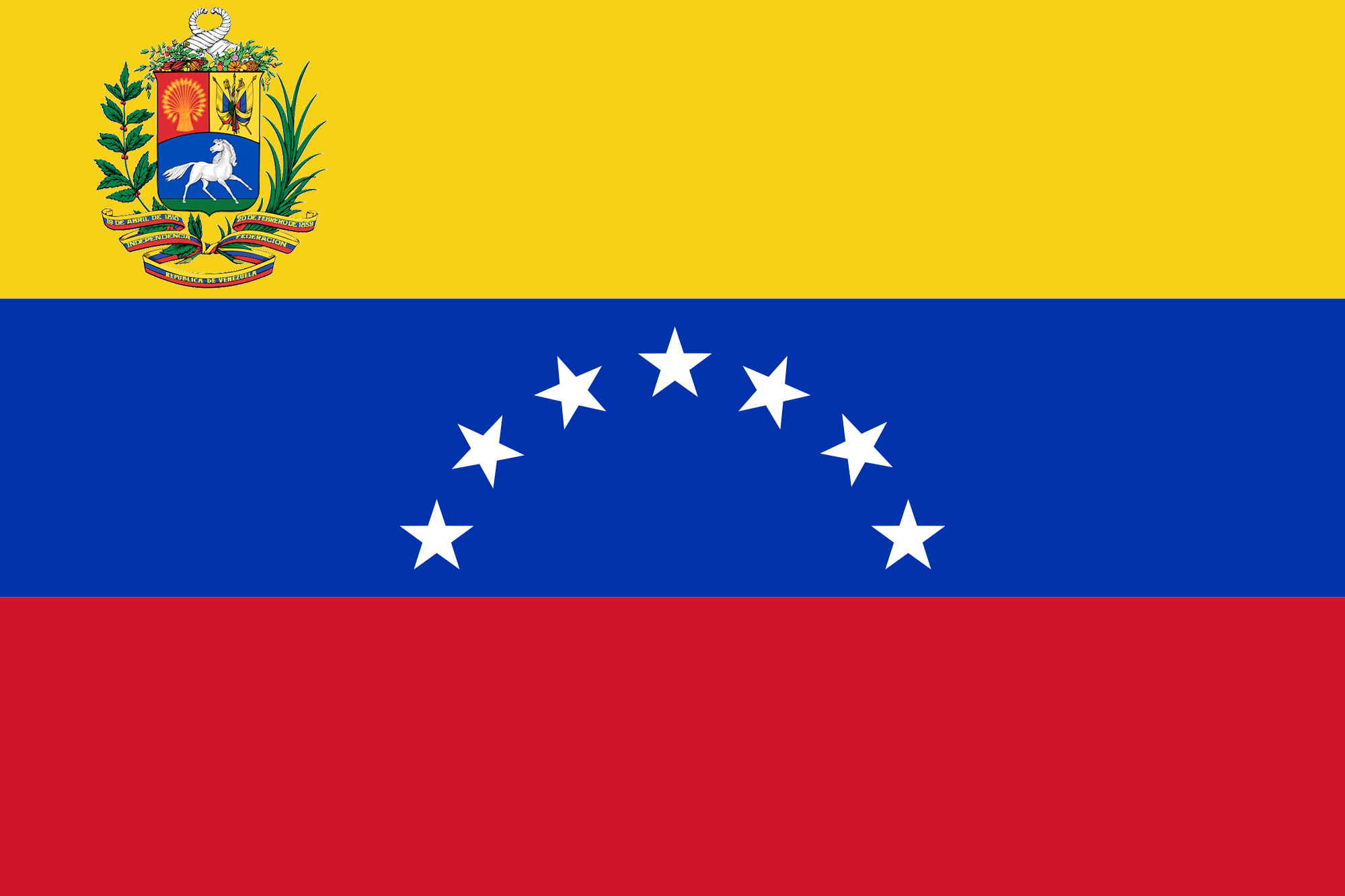
- The flag of Venezuela
- IOC code: VEN
- NOC: Venezuelan Olympic Committee
- Website: cov.com.ve (in Spanish)

in Nagano
- Competitors: 1 (woman) in 1 sport
- Flag bearer: Iginia Boccalandro
- Medals: Gold 0 Silver 0 Bronze 0 Total 0

Winter Olympics appearances (overview)
- 1998; 2002; 2006; 2010; 2014; 2018–2022; 2026

Venezuela sent a delegation to compete in the Winter Olympic Games for the first time at the 1998 Winter Olympics in Nagano, Japan from 7–22 February 1998. The delegation consisted of a single luge competitor, Iginia Boccalandro. In the women's singles she came in 28th place out of 29 competitors.

== Background ==
Venezuela joined Olympic competition at the 1948 Summer Olympics and has participated in every Summer Olympic Games since then. The 1998 Nagano Games were the country's first appearance at a Winter Olympic Games. Venezuela has, as of 2018, won 15 medals at Summer Olympics, but never won a medal at the Winter Olympics. These Winter Olympics were held from 7–22 February 1998; a total of 2,176 athletes represented 72 National Olympic Committees. The only athlete Venezuela sent to Nagano was a luger, Iginia Boccalandro. She was the flag bearer for the opening ceremony.

== Competitors ==
The following is the list of number of competitors in the Games.

Sport	Men	Women	Total
Luge	0	1	1
Total	0	1	1

== Luge ==
Iginia Boccalandro was 36 years old at the time of the Nagano Olympics, and was making her Olympic debut. Before the Games, the Salt Lake City, Utah resident claimed that "I'm too old and fat"; she said her real goal was the 2002 Winter Olympics, by which time she would have had enough training to be a contender. The women's singles event was held over two days, 10–11 February. Each athlete took four runs down the course, two on each day, with the sum of the times of all four runs determining the rankings. On the first day, Boccalandro posted run times of 54.232 seconds and 53.962 seconds. After the first day of competition, she was in 28th place out of 29 competitors, with a time of 1 minute and 48.194 seconds. On the second day her run times were 54.133 seconds in the third run, and 56.990 seconds for her fourth and final run.

Boccalandro's total time for her four runs was therefore 3 minutes and 39.317 seconds, putting her in 28th position. The gold medal was won by Silke Kraushaar-Pielach of Germany in a time of 3 minutes and 23.779 seconds, the silver was taken by her compatriot Barbara Niedernhuber, and the bronze was won by Angelika Neuner of Austria. Boccalandro would achieve her goal and return to Olympic competition in her hometown four years later at the 2002 Winter Olympics.

Athlete	Run 1		Run 2		Run 3		Run 4		Total	
Athlete	Time	Rank	Time	Rank	Time	Rank	Time	Rank	Time	Rank
Iginia Boccalandro	54.232	28	53.962	28	54.133	28	56.990	29	3:39.317	28
