= Nick Sullivan =

Nick Sullivan may refer to:

- Nick Sullivan (soccer) (born 1998), Australian soccer player
- Nick Sullivan (luger) (born 1979), American luger
- Nick Sullivan (Neighbours)
