= Venezuela at the 2026 Winter Olympics =

- Flag of Venezuela
- IOC code: VEN
- NOC: Venezuelan Olympic Committee
- Website: cov.com.ve (in Spanish)

in Milan and Cortina d'Ampezzo, Italy 6 February 2026 – 22 February 2026
- Competitors: 1 (1 man) in 1 sport
- Flag bearer (opening): Nicolas Claveau-Laviolette
- Flag bearer (closing): Volunteer
- Medals: Gold 0 Silver 0 Bronze 0 Total 0

Winter Olympics appearances (overview)
- 1998; 2002; 2006; 2010; 2014; 2018–2022; 2026

Venezuela competed at the 2026 Winter Olympics in Milan and Cortina d'Ampezzo, Italy, from 6 to 22 February 2026. It was Venezuela's first participation in the Winter Olympics since 2014. Its flagbearer and sole athlete, cross-country skier Nicolas Claveau-Laviolette, was born in Venezuela and raised in Canada. Qualifying two months before the Olympics, political unrest in Venezuela meant it was even later before he could renew his documents and register to compete.

== Competitors ==
The following is the list of number of competitors participating at the 2026 Olympic Games per sport/discipline.

Competitors for Venezuela at the 2026 Winter Olympics
| Sport | Men | Women | Total |
|---|---|---|---|
| Cross-country skiing | 1 | 0 | 1 |
| Total | 1 | 0 | 1 |

Venezuela returned to the Winter Olympic Games for the first time in twelve years, since the 2014 Winter Olympics, after failing to qualify an athlete in both 2018 and 2022. Their sole athlete, becoming only the nation's sixth Winter Olympian and its first in cross-country skiing, was Nicolas Claveau-Laviolette. Born in Venezuela to Québécois parents, Claveau-Laviolette was predominantly raised in Canada, where he took up and trains in the sport.

=== Qualifying and eligibility ===
Due to his low standing in international rankings, Claveau-Laviolette knew he would likely not qualify for the Canadian team nor meet the competition standards for nations with significant skiing history. Despite having previously represented Canada, he got in touch with the Venezuelan Olympic Committee (COV) through an email initially to the national skiing federation. After hearing back from them in an hour, he began planning to represent his nation of birth, for which he could qualify more easily due to its lack of skiing tradition. On 28 November 2025, Claveau-Laviolette met qualifying standards at the International Ski and Snowboard Federation (FIS) event at Ruka in Finland. Another athlete at Ruka was Guillermo Racero, an Austrian-raised skier also aiming to qualify for Venezuela, where he was born. Racero had already returned to Venezuela to renew his documents before the race, but failed to meet the standards. The Venezuelan hopefuls invited two Finnish athletes to join them in Ruka, getting them accreditation in return for strategy advice on the course there, with Claveau-Laviolette later opining "It's a great gesture from them [Finland]; obviously, they don't see me as a threat to their athletes, and everyone's happy."

The COV earned a quota spot in the cross-country skiing draw, awarding it to Claveau-Laviolette and inviting him to Caracas to meet with them and renew his documents; the trip was planned for early January 2026 during his break from university. This was postponed following the United States intervention in Venezuela on 3 January, which caused the closure of the Venezuelan embassy in Ottawa, flight cancellations and concerns of unrest. Unsure if Claveau-Laviolette would be able to enter Venezuela to get valid documentation and register for the Olympics on time, the possibility of having Racero take the spot instead was considered, which Claveau-Laviolette said would have been the "simplest solution". The COV remained in contact and he managed to travel to Caracas on 18 January and stay for a week with the support of the COV, including directly from its president María Soto. Claveau-Laviolette made television talk show appearances while in Caracas, becoming quickly recognizable. Racero was also in the delegation at the Games; the Venezuelan delegation was still small, though Claveau-Laviolette said he did not think a larger team would add much.

=== Ceremonies ===
As the only athlete, Claveau-Laviolette was also the nation's flagbearer at the opening ceremony's Parade of Nations. Venezuela was last alphabetically of all nations at the Games, entering before the upcoming and current host nations; the parade was split across three locations to keep athletes close to their competition venues, with Claveau-Laviolette parading in Predazzo. A volunteer was the country's flagbearer during the closing ceremony.

== Cross-country skiing ==
Following the completion of the 2025–26 FIS Cross-Country World Cup in the first World Cup period (28 November – 14 December 2025), Venezuela qualified one male athlete to become one of five countries whose only athlete at the 2026 Games was a cross-country skier. It was represented by Nicolas Claveau-Laviolette in two events.

Speaking to Canadian media before the Games, Claveau-Laviolette said he did not expect to get near the podium, but wanted to represent Venezuela and give the nation someone to support, as well as experience the Olympics. He also spoke of giving Venezuelans some respite during the national crisis, and providing visibility for the sizeable Venezuelan diaspora. After the competition, he reflected how encouraged he felt by people cheering him on and the support of other athletes, including the Finnish team, whose technicians waxed his skis, and Mexican athletes, who helped test his skis and included him in coaching. He considered inspiring young Venezuelans to ski – and receiving messages from those inspired during the Games – a greater achievement than Olympic participation.

Claveau-Laviolette finished 88th of 95 in qualifying for the men's sprint on 10 February 2026, and then came 98th of 113 in the 10 kilometre on 13 February 2026. Canadian media considered it an achievement for him, one of the youngest and least-experienced skiers, to have finished both races.

Distance

Men's 10 kilometre freestyle results
| Athlete | Event | Final | | |
| Athlete | Event | Time | Deficit | Rank |
|---|---|---|---|---|
| Nicolas Claveau-Laviolette | Men's 10 kilometre freestyle | 26:59.8 | 6:23.6 | 98 |

The race had an interval start, with Claveau-Laviolette skiing 101st and setting off at 12:35.30 CET (following the event start at 11:45). He was affected by the sunlight during the race, starting strong before dropping back for much of it, then improving towards the end. The IOC provided race progression section results for six intermediate distances (and final 1 km section) during the race:

Nicolas Claveau-Laviolette's race progression
| Sec. | Int. | Results (Nicolas Claveau-Laviolette) | | | | |
| Sec. | Int. | Per section | | Cumulative | | |
| Sec. | Int. | Time | Rank | Time | Deficit | Rank |
|---|---|---|---|---|---|---|
| 1 | 1.8 km | 4:12.9 | 88 | 4:12.9 | +0:46.3 | 88 |
| 2 | 3.7 km | 4:30.0 | 100 | 8:42.9 | +1:37.0 | 97 |
| 3 | 4.9 km | 4:52.5 | 100 | 13:35.4 | +3:08.0 | 99 |
| 4 | 7.4 km | 5:46.2 | 100 | 19:21.6 | +4:31.1 | 99 |
| 5 | 8.6 km | 3:59.9 | 94 | 23:21.5 | +5:30.7 | 99 |
| 6 | 9.0 km | 0:52.0 | 98 | 24:13.5 | +5:40.5 | 99 |
| 7 | (Finish) | 2:46.3 | 97 | 26:59.8 | +6:23.6 | 98 |

Sprint

Men's sprint results
| Athlete | Event | Qualification | | Quarterfinal | | Semifinal | | Final | |
| Athlete | Event | Time | Rank | Time | Rank | Time | Rank | Time | Rank |
|---|---|---|---|---|---|---|---|---|---|
| Nicolas Claveau-Laviolette | Men's sprint | 3:47.29 | 88 | Did not advance | | | | | |

The race had an interval start, with Claveau-Laviolette skiing 87th and setting off at 10:18.45 (following the event start at 09:57).
