= Kyle Connelly =

Canadian luger (born 1980)

Personal information
- Born: 22 April 1980 (age 45) Ottawa, Ontario, Canada

Sport
- Sport: Luge

Kyle Connelly (born 22 April 1980) is a Canadian luger. He competed in the men's singles event at the 2002 Winter Olympics.
