= Cross-country skiing at the 2026 Winter Olympics – Qualification =

The following is about the qualification rules and the quota allocation for the cross-country skiing events at the 2026 Winter Olympics.

== Qualification rules ==
=== Quotas ===
A maximum of 296 athletes are allowed to compete in cross-country skiing, 148 men and 148 women. A maximum of 16 athletes per nation will be allowed to compete with a maximum of 8 males or 8 females from a nation being permitted. A nation may not enter more than four athletes in any single event. Each nation may also enter a maximum of one team in each gender's team combined events.

'A' Standard

An athlete who has less than 150.00 FIS Distance points on the list published on 19 January 2026, can be entered in the distance and/or sprint events.

'B' Standard

An athlete who has not met the 'A' standard, but has less than 350.00 FIS Distance points may be entered in the 15 km men's or 10 km women's race, and team events (relay and team sprint). Similarly, athletes who have less than 350.00 FIS Sprint points may be entered in the sprint, or the team sprint.

Additional Relay eligibility

For relay events, each NOC may use an athlete who is entered in Nordic Combined or Biathlon, to a maximum of one athlete per gender, granted athletes meet the standard above.

=== Allocation of quotas ===
Basic Quota

Every NOC will be assigned one quota spot for meeting the basic standard at an individual competition held at the FIS Nordic World Ski Championships 2025 or the 2025 Nordic Junior World Ski Championships; males must be equal to or less than 300.00 FIS points, females 330.00.

NOC Quota

The FIS Cross Country Nation Ranking 2024–2025, takes into account results from each gender, will be used to allocate additional quotas per gender. Nations ranked one through five will receive four additional quotas, nations six through ten receive three, nations eleven through twenty receive two, and nations twenty-one through thirty receive one.

Remaining quotas

The remainder of the quota places, up to a maximum of 138 per gender, will be distributed in four rounds using the Nation Ranking proceeding from the highest ranked nation down. Nations from 1 to 5 receive an additional quota in round one. Nations from 1 to 10 receive an additional quota in round two. Nations from 1 to 20 receive an quota in round three. All remaining quotas are distributed in round four.

Once an NOC has achieved 8 quotas per gender, it will no longer be counted, and the next eligible NOC will be allocated a place.

The remaining 10 quota places by gender will be assigned to NOCs that were not able to achieve a quota, granted all athletes have scored less than 300.00 FIS points at one FIS World Cup competition in the first World Cup period (28 November – 14 December 2025).

Host nation

If the host nation (Italy) is not allocated 4 quota places per gender through the qualification pathways, additional quotas will be allocated until 4 athletes per gender is reached, granted all athletes meet the standard above.

== Qualification summary ==
NOCs with a 'basic' quota have met minimum participation standards and are assured of Olympic participation. 'Additional' quotas are also assured, unless the NOC does not have enough eligible athletes to fulfill their quota. Ten more quotas per gender were available to nations not already qualified, during world cup races up until 14 December 2025.

- Final allocation.

Nations	Women (basic)	Men (basic)	Additional women	Additional men	Final 10 women	Final 10 men	Athletes
Andorra	1	1	~~1~~ 0	~~1~~ 0			2
Argentina	1	1	1	1			4
Armenia	1	1	~~1~~ 0				2
Australia	1	1	3	2			7
Austria	1	1	4	2			8
Belgium		~~1~~ 0					0
Bolivia		1					1
Bosnia and Herzegovina		1			1		2
Brazil	1	1	1				3
Bulgaria	1	1		1			3
Canada	1	1	6	4			12
Chile		1					1
China	1	1	3	1			6
Colombia		1					1
Croatia	1	1	1				3
Czech Republic	1	1	6	4			12
Denmark		~~1~~ 0					0
Ecuador						1	1
Estonia	1	1	4	2			8
Finland	1	1	7	7			16
France	1	1	6	7			15
Germany	1	1	7	4			13
Great Britain	1	1		2			4
Greece	1	1	1				3
Haiti		1					1
Hungary	1	1	1	1			4
Iceland	1	1					2
India		1					1
Individual Neutral Athletes					2	1	3
Iran	1	1					2
Ireland		1		~~1~~ 0			1
Israel						1	1
Italy	1	1	6	5			13
Japan	1	1	~~3~~ 0	2			4
Kazakhstan	1	1	3	2			7
Kyrgyzstan		1					1
Latvia	1	1	3	2			7
Lebanon						1	1
Liechtenstein	~~1~~ 0	1					1
Lithuania	1	1	1	1			4
Malta	1						1
Mexico	1	1					2
Moldova					1	1	2
Mongolia	1	1					2
Montenegro		1					1
Morocco						1	1
Nigeria		1					1
North Macedonia		1			1		2
Norway	1	1	7	7			16
Poland	1	1	3	2			7
Portugal		1					1
Romania	1	1		1			3
Saudi Arabia		1					1
Serbia	1	1					2
Slovakia	1	1		1			3
Slovenia	1	1	3	2			7
South Africa		1					1
South Korea	1	1	1				3
Spain		1		2			3
Sweden	1	1	7	7			16
Switzerland	1	1	6	4			12
Chinese Taipei	1	1	~~1~~ 0				2
Thailand		1			1		2
Turkey	1	1					2
Ukraine	1	1	3	1			6
United States	1	1	7	7			16
Venezuela						1	1
Total: 65 (Note: The FIS has a total of 68; they have separated AIN into 'Russia' and 'Belarus' in their tables, and both Belgium and Denmark rejected their only quotas.)	41	57	101	84	6	7	296

=== FIS Cross Country Nation Ranking 2024-2025 ===
Remaining Quotas (D3) are allocated until the total quotas for the gender have reached 138. Following the distribution of achieved quotas in the first world cup period of 2025/26 stage D3 resumed until the total per gender reached 148. If quotas are returned this list will be used for reallocation beginning with NOCs that have not already received the maximum of eight; beginning with Switzerland in Women's, France in men's.

As of 15 December 2025.

Women's standings
Rank	Nations	NOC Quotas (D2)	Remaining Quotas (D3)
Top 5	Norway	4	3
Top 5	Sweden	4	3
Top 5	Germany	4	3
Top 5	Finland	4	3
Top 5	United States	4	3
6th through 10th	Switzerland	3	2
6th through 10th	Italy	3	2
6th through 10th	France	3	2
6th through 10th	Canada	3	2
6th through 10th	Czech Republic	3	2
11th through 20th	Austria	2	1
11th through 20th	Estonia	2	1
11th through 20th	Australia	2	1
11th through 20th	Kazakhstan	2	1
11th through 20th	Slovenia	2	1
11th through 20th	Poland	2	1
11th through 20th	Ukraine	2	1 (Note: One quota given following completion of first period of world cup 2025/26.)
11th through 20th	Japan	2	1
11th through 20th	Latvia	2	1
11th through 20th	China	2	1
21st through 30th	Andorra	1	—N/a
21st through 30th	South Korea	1	—N/a
21st through 30th	Croatia	1	—N/a
21st through 30th	Chinese Taipei	1	—N/a
21st through 30th	Hungary	1	—N/a
21st through 30th	Brazil	1	—N/a
21st through 30th	Lithuania	1	—N/a
21st through 30th	Argentina	1	—N/a
21st through 30th	Greece	1	—N/a
21st through 30th	Armenia	1	—N/a

Men's standings
Rank	Nations	NOC Quotas (D2)	Remaining Quotas (D3)
Top 5	Norway	4	3
Top 5	Sweden	4	3
Top 5	France	4	2
Top 5	Finland	4	2
Top 5	United States	4	2
6th through 10th	Italy	3	1
6th through 10th	Germany	3	1
6th through 10th	Switzerland	3	1
6th through 10th	Czech Republic	3	1
6th through 10th	Canada	3	1
11th through 20th	Austria	2	—N/a
11th through 20th	Great Britain	2	—N/a
11th through 20th	Slovenia	2	—N/a
11th through 20th	Estonia	2	—N/a
11th through 20th	Australia	2	—N/a
11th through 20th	Poland	2	—N/a
11th through 20th	Japan	2	—N/a
11th through 20th	Latvia	2	—N/a
11th through 20th	Spain	2	—N/a
11th through 20th	Kazakhstan	2	—N/a
21st through 30th	Ireland	1	—N/a
21st through 30th	Ukraine	1	—N/a
21st through 30th	Andorra	1	—N/a
21st through 30th	China	1	—N/a
21st through 30th	Hungary	1	—N/a
21st through 30th	Romania	1	—N/a
21st through 30th	Bulgaria	1	—N/a
21st through 30th	Argentina	1	—N/a
21st through 30th	Slovakia	1	—N/a
21st through 30th	Lithuania	1	—N/a

=== Final ten quotas per gender ===
NOCs who did not earn a quota through the FIS Nordic World Ski Championships 2025 or the 2025 Nordic Junior World Ski Championships are eligible to receive one of ten available quotas (per gender). Athletes must score less than 300.00 FIS points at one FIS World Cup competition in the first World Cup period (28 November – 14 December 2025). Athletes are ranked by their single best result in a world cup race.

Men's standings
Position	Athlete	Points
1	(Individual Neutral Athletes) (Note: Individual Neutral Athletes from Russia.) Savelii Korostelev	47.21
2	(Moldova) Mihail Carpov	183.79
3	(Venezuela) Nicolas Claveau-Laviolette	214.10
4	(Lebanon) Samer Tawk	257.06
5	(Morocco) Abderahim Kemmissa	283.16
6	(Israel) Attila Kertesz	293.87
7	(Ecuador) Klaus Jungbluth	297.25

Women's standings
Position	Country	Points
1	(Individual Neutral Athletes) Dariya Nepryaeva	35.21
2	(Individual Neutral Athletes) (Note: Individual Neutral Athletes from Belarus.) Hanna Machakhina	130.77
3	(Thailand) Karen Chanloung	211.72
4	(North Macedonia) Ana Cvetanovska	222.86
5	(Bosnia and Herzegovina) Teodora Delipara	239.16
6	(Moldova) Elizaveta Hlusovici	261.28

=== Reallocation of declined quotas ===
Reallocation continued from where 'D3' had stopped following the allocation of the 'final ten' quotas. The listed NOCs accepted one more quota in the order indicated.

Women's	Men's
Switzerland; Italy; France; Canada; Czech Republic; Austria; Estonia	France; Finland; United States; Italy
