= Jozef Škvarek =

Slovak luger

Personal information
- Nationality: Slovak
- Born: 19 August 1963 (age 61); Poprad, Czechoslovakia

Sport
- Sport: Luge

Jozef Škvarek (born 19 August 1963) is a Slovak luger. He competed in the men's singles event at the 1994 Winter Olympics.
