= Claudio Palma =

Chilean play-by-play commentator

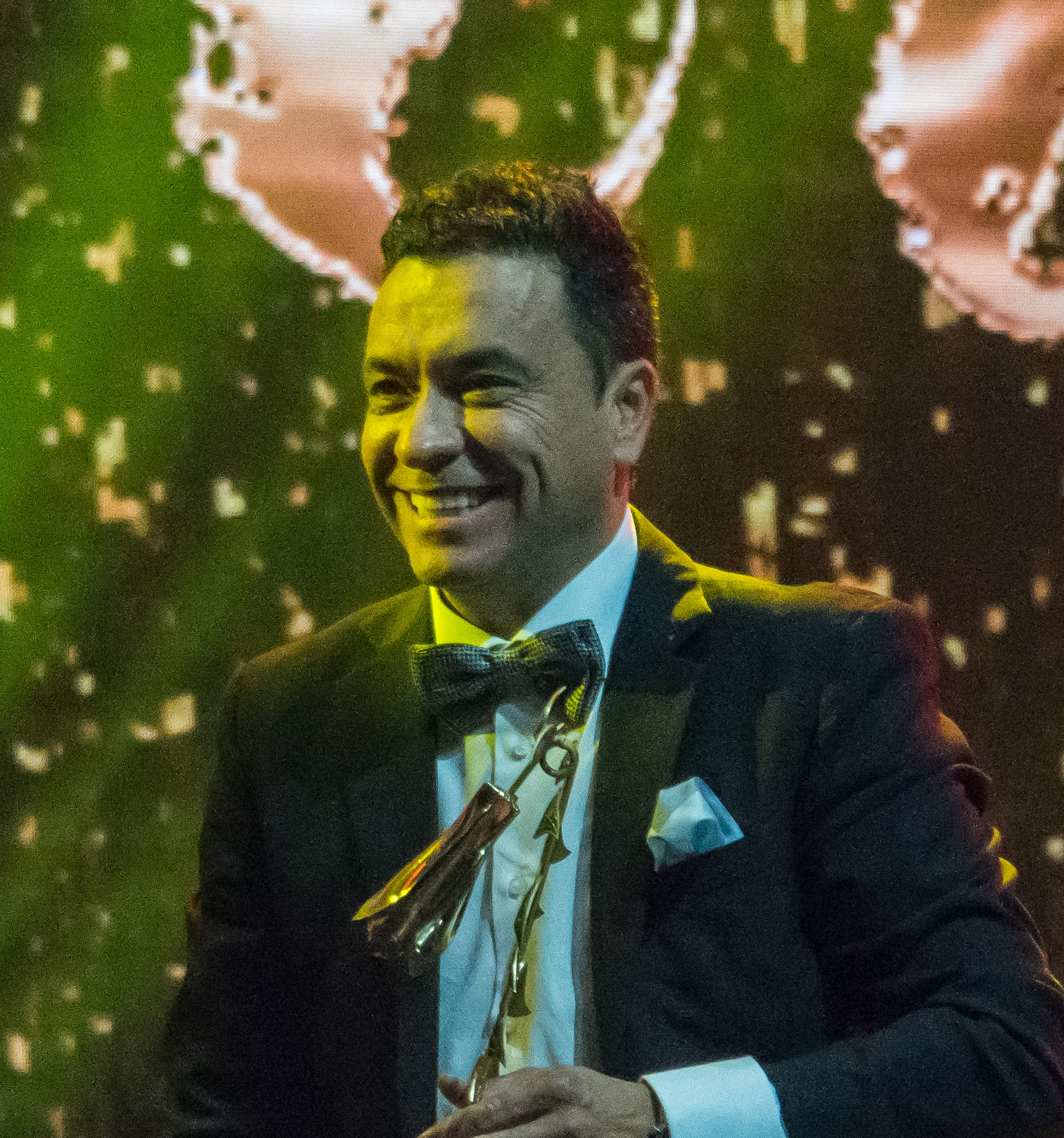
- Born: Claudio Rodrigo Palma Barrueto; 1 June 1969 (age 56); Santiago, Chile
- Occupation: Sports commentator

Claudio Rodrigo Palma Barrueto (born 1 June 1969) is a Chilean play-by-play commentator.

He has related the most important Chilean football matches for various television and radio networks, including Canal del Fútbol (CDF; 2003–2014/2018–present), Canal 13 (2011–2018), Fox Sports Chile (2014-2018), ADN Radio Chile (2008–2010/2020) and Chilevisión (2018–present). In 2010, he worked as play-by-play commentator for DirecTV Sports during the 2010 FIFA World Cup in South Africa alongside former footballer Sebastián Rozental, who accompanied him as color commentator.

Palma is considered one of the best play-by-play commentators in Chilean sports history and he has the particularity of being known thanks to Pro Evolution Soccer 6 patches: piracy's version which simulated Primera División de Chile footballers and matches instead of other European leagues.

== Biography ==
=== Beginnings: 1989–2003 ===
He began his career in late 1980s on Radio AM Yungay in a program directed by Santiago Chavarría that broadcast amateur football. Later, he moved to Radio Santiago and then to Radio Portales. In this last station, he met Eduardo Bonvallet, who, upon taking over as «Más Deporte» director on Radio Nacional de Chile, decided to take him to that station.

In 1996, he made his debut on television in La Red, private channel where he narrated matches of the Chile national football team team road to 1998 FIFA World Cup. In these broadcastings he was accompanied by Bonvallet.

After narrating on La Red, he joined Sky Sports (which in that time it had broadcasting rights of Chilean soccer) and was the second commentator of "La Clave del Deporte" in Radio La Clave behind Carlos Alberto Campusano.

=== Rising in CDF: 2003–2014 ===
In 2003, Palma arrived as commentator during Canal del Fútbol (CDF) foundation. In that channel, he gradually began to consecrate after narrating the most part of games of Chile's three popular teams: Colo-Colo, Universidad de Chile and Universidad Católica.

In 2006, he was hired by Megavisión to narrate 2006 FIFA World Cup matches.

=== Return to CDF: 2018–2021 ===
On August 13, 2018, he left Canal 13 and it was announced —through a letter of Chilevisión— his arrival to sports area of the aforementioned channel with the goal to narrate Chilean football team matches (official and exhibition games) in tournaments like 2019 Copa América or, hypothetically, the 2022 FIFA World Cup.

In 2019, he came back to CDF after five years of his first departure. That return it was possible due to the purchase of CDF by WarnerMedia, controller firm of Chilevisión. In 2020, he also returned to ADN Deportes to narrate Chilean clubs matches in 2020 Copa Libertadores.

=== TNT Sports: 2021–present ===
In January 2021, CDF announced its end through its change of name to TNT Sports.
