= Bermuda at the 2002 Winter Olympics =

- IOC code: BER
- NOC: Bermuda Olympic Association
- Website: www.olympics.bm

in Salt Lake City
- Competitors: 1 (man) in 1 sport
- Flag bearer: Patrick Singleton
- Medals: Gold 0 Silver 0 Bronze 0 Total 0

Winter Olympics appearances (overview)
- 1992; 1994; 1998; 2002; 2006; 2010; 2014; 2018; 2022; 2026

Bermuda sent a delegation to compete at the 2002 Winter Olympics in Salt Lake City, United States from 8–24 February 2002. This was Bermuda's fourth appearance at a Winter Olympic Games. The delegation consisted of a single competitor, luge racer Patrick Singleton. This was his second Olympics, and he finished his event in 37th place.

== Background ==
Bermuda first participated in Olympic competition at the 1936 Berlin Summer Games, made their Winter Olympic Games debut in 1992 at the Albertville Games, and have appeared in every Olympics since their respective debuts bar one, the boycotted 1980 Summer Olympics in Moscow. The only medal the territory has won so far is a bronze in the sport of boxing at the 1976 Summer Olympics. The Bermudian delegation to Salt Lake City consisted of a single athlete, luger Patrick Singleton. He was the flag bearer for both the opening ceremony and the closing ceremony.

== Luge ==
Patrick Singleton was 27 years old at the time of the Salt Lake City Olympics. He had previously raced for Bermuda in the 1998 Winter Olympics, and would go on race skeleton representing Bermuda at the 2006 Winter Olympics. On 10–11 February, the men's singles luge competition was held, two runs on each day. His first day saw run times of 47 seconds and 48.7 seconds, finishing the first day in 44th place. Singleton did better on the second day, with his third run coming in at 45.7 seconds, his fastest of the competition. He completed his final run in a time of 46.3 seconds, making his total time 3 minutes and 7.7 seconds. He finished in 37th place, gaining seven places on the second day, and he was 9.8 seconds behind gold medal time.

Athlete	Run 1		Run 2		Run 3		Run 4		Total	
Athlete	Time	Rank	Time	Rank	Time	Rank	Time	Rank	Time	Rank
Patrick Singleton	47.015	39	48.690	45	45.769	30	46.298	33	3:07.772	37
