= Bermuda at the 2018 Winter Olympics =

- Flag of Bermuda
- IOC code: BER
- NOC: Bermuda Olympic Association
- Website: www.olympics.bm

in Pyeongchang, South Korea 9–25 February 2018
- Competitors: 1 in 1 sport
- Flag bearer: Tucker Murphy
- Medals: Gold 0 Silver 0 Bronze 0 Total 0

Winter Olympics appearances (overview)
- 1992; 1994; 1998; 2002; 2006; 2010; 2014; 2018; 2022–2026

Bermuda sent a delegation to compete at the 2018 Winter Olympics in Pyeongchang, South Korea, from 9–25 February 2018. This was the territory's eighth appearance in the Winter Olympics. For the third consecutive Olympics, Bermuda was represented by one athlete, cross-country skier Tucker Murphy, who finished his only event in 104th place.

== Background ==
Bermuda first appeared in Olympic competition at the 1936 Berlin Summer Games, made their Winter Olympic Games debut in 1992 at the Albertville Games, and have appeared in every Olympics since their respective debuts bar one, the boycotted 1980 Summer Olympics in Moscow. The only medal the territory has won so far is a bronze in the sport of boxing at the 1976 Summer Olympics. For the third straight Winter Olympics, cross-country skier Tucker Murphy was Bermuda's only representative. The delegation also consisted of Murphy's coach, Pepa Miloucheva, his waxer Jeff Shaw, the chef de mission Lawrence Murphy, and Sean Field-Lament, who represented the Bermuda Olympic Association's executive board. Tucker Murphy was chosen as the flag bearer for both the parade of nations during the opening ceremony and for the closing ceremony.

== Cross-country skiing ==
Bermuda qualified one male athlete, Tucker Murphy. Murphy, who was 36 years old at the time, was making his third straight appearance at the Winter Olympics. He finished the men's 15 km freestyle in a time of 43 minutes and 5 seconds, which was good for 104th place; he was more than nine minutes behind the gold medallist, Dario Cologna of Switzerland.

Athlete	Event	Final		
Athlete	Event	Time	Deficit	Rank
Tucker Murphy	Men's 15 km freestyle	43:05.7	+9:21.8	104

== See also ==
- Bermuda at the 2018 Commonwealth Games
