= Bermuda at the 2010 Winter Olympics =

- IOC code: BER
- NOC: Bermuda Olympic Association
- Website: www.olympics.bm

in Vancouver, Canada
- Competitors: 1 in 1 sport
- Flag bearer: Tucker Murphy
- Medals: Gold 0 Silver 0 Bronze 0 Total 0

Winter Olympics appearances (overview)
- 1992; 1994; 1998; 2002; 2006; 2010; 2014; 2018; 2022–2026

Bermuda sent a delegation to compete in the 2010 Winter Olympics in Vancouver, British Columbia, Canada. from 12 to 28 February 2010. The territory sent one athlete, cross-country skier Tucker Murphy. This was the country's first appearance in a skiing discipline. Murphy finished 88th in the 15 kilometre freestyle event, the only one he was entered into.

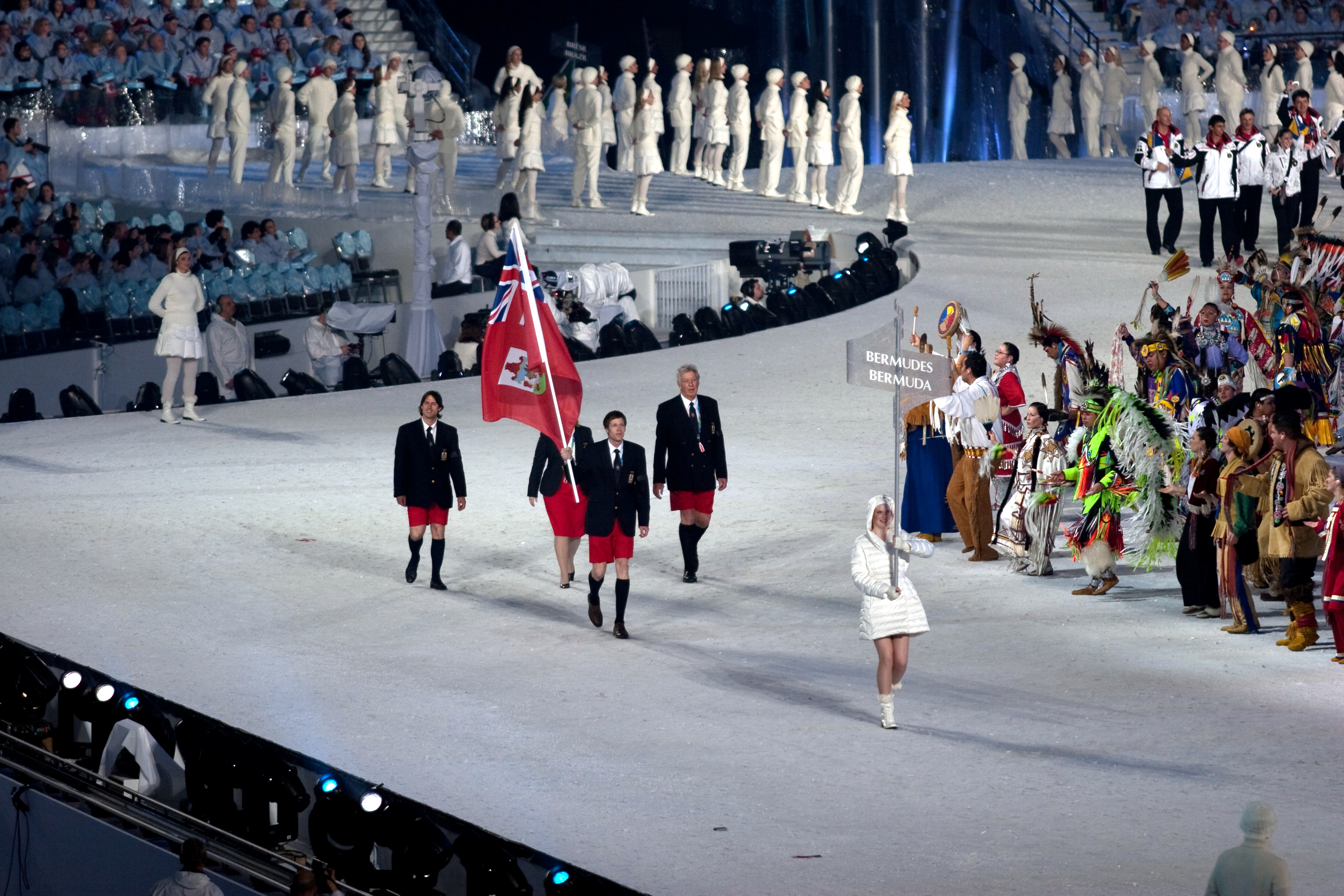
The delegation entering the stadium during the opening ceremonies.

== Background ==
Bermuda first appeared in Olympic competition at the 1936 Berlin Summer Games, made their Winter Olympic Games debut in 1992 at the Albertville Games; and have appeared in every Olympics since their respective debuts, excluding the boycotted 1980 Summer Olympics in Moscow. The only medal the territory has won so far is a bronze in the sport of boxing at the 1976 Summer Olympics. Cross-country skier Tucker Murphy was the only athlete representing Bermuda at the 2010 Winter Olympics, and the first time Bermuda had a representative in the skiing disciplines. Murphy was only the third Winter Olympian ever sent from Bermuda. Murphy was chosen as the flag bearer for both the opening ceremony and the closing ceremony.

== Cross-country skiing ==
Tucker Murphy was born on 21 October 1981, making him 28 years old at the time of the Vancouver Olympics. He was entered into only one event, the 15 kilometre freestyle race. The race was held on 15 February 2010. Murphy recorded a time of 42 minutes and 39 seconds, which was a little over 9 minutes off the gold-medal pace. He finished in 88th place out of the 95 athletes who finished the race.

Athlete	Event	Final		
Athlete	Event	Time	Deficit	Rank
Tucker Murphy	15 kilometre freestyle	42:39.1	9:02.8	88

== See also ==
- Bermuda at the Olympics
