= Venezuela at the Olympics =

- IOC code: VEN
- NOC: Venezuelan Olympic Committee
- Website: cov.com.ve (in Spanish)
- Medals Ranked 82nd: Gold 3 Silver 7 Bronze 9 Total 19

Summer appearances
- 1948; 1952; 1956; 1960; 1964; 1968; 1972; 1976; 1980; 1984; 1988; 1992; 1996; 2000; 2004; 2008; 2012; 2016; 2020; 2024; 2028

Winter appearances
- 1998; 2002; 2006; 2010; 2014; 2018–2022; 2026

Venezuela first participated at the Olympic Games in 1948, and has sent athletes to compete in every Summer Olympic Games since then. The nation has also participated in the Winter Olympic Games since 1998. The Venezuelan Olympic Committee (COV) was created in 1935.

The first Venezuelan athlete to participate in the Olympic Games was cyclist Julio César León in London 1948. In 1968 Francisco Rodríguez earned the first gold medal. The first Venezuelan to participate in the Winter Olympic Games was Iginia Boccalandro, in the 1998 Winter Olympics.

Venezuelan athletes have won a total of nineteen medals, all at Summer Games, with boxing (six medals; one gold, three silver, two bronze) being the most successful sport. The most successful Olympian is Yulimar Rojas, Venezuela's only multi-medalist in a regular Games, with one gold and one silver in women's triple jump.

== History ==
The first Venezuelan to participate in the Olympic Games was Trujillo cyclist Julio César León in London 1948.

In the 1952 Summer Olympics, Asnoldo Devonish earned a bronze medal which became the first Olympic medal in the country's history. In 1968 Francisco Rodríguez earned the first gold medal; obtaining silver and bronze medals in various games until 1984. The first Venezuelan to participate in the Winter Olympic Games was Iginia Boccalandro in Nagano 1998. Rafael Vidal was bronze medalist in the 200 m butterfly in swimming at the 1984 Los Angeles Olympic Games. Arlindo Gouveia won a gold medal in taekwondo in Barcelona 1992, but at that time the sport only participated as an exhibition. That medal, along with the bronze medal won by Adriana Carmona in the same sport, are counted as official by the Venezuelan Taekwondo Federation since 2018.

=== Athens 2004 ===
Venezuela participated in the 2004 Athens Games with 48 athletes, winning two bronze medals with Adriana Carmona and Israel Rubio in taekwondo and weightlifting.

=== Turin 2006 ===
Venezuela participated in the Turin 2006 Winter Olympics thanks to Werner Hoeger in the luge specialty.

=== Beijing 2008 ===
In the 2008 Beijing Games, Venezuela became the only country (only behind the host China) to double the number of athletes qualified with respect to the previous games, going from 48 athletes in Athens 2004 to 108 athletes in 2008, making it the delegation with the greatest progress with respect to the last games. For this occasion, Venezuela qualified for the first time 3 team sports, men's and women's volleyball and the women's softball team. Previously, only in 1980 in Moscow (soccer) and in Barcelona 1992 (basketball) had Venezuela been able to qualify team sports. In these games, Venezuelan Dalia Contreras won the bronze medal in Taekwondo in the 49 kilograms category, after defeating Kenyan Mildred Alango 1–0.

=== London 2012 ===
Fencer Rubén Limardo wins the third gold medal for the nation. Limardo also becomes the first Latin American to win a gold medal in fencing since 1904, over 100 years ago.

=== Sochi 2014 ===
Venezuela achieves its 4th participation in the 2004 Winter Olympic Games thanks to the athlete Antonio Pardo Andretta in the alpine skiing specialty.

=== Río 2016 ===
In these Olympic Games, Venezuela almost achieved a number of athletes almost equal to that of Beijing 2008, and even achieved a better record of medals than in those Olympic Games, with a total of three medals in the categories of boxing, cycling and athletics by the Venezuelan representatives: Yoel Finol, Yulimar Rojas and Stefany Hernández, thus completing their participation in these Olympic Games with one bronze medal and two silver medals.

=== Tokyo 2020 ===
In these Olympic Games, Venezuela competes with 44 athletes being its smallest delegation since 1988, obtaining 4 medals; 3 silver medals won by Julio Mayora and Keydomar Vallenilla in weightlifting and Daniel Dhers in BMX freestyle and a gold by Yulimar Rojas in triple jump, who broke the world and Olympic record in the history of this category of athletics in the Olympic Games, with a mark of 15. 67 meters, in addition to becoming the first woman to receive a gold medal in the history of the Olympic Games for Venezuela.

== Medal tables ==
=== Medals by Summer Games ===
Games	Athletes	Gold	Silver	Bronze	Total	Rank
(United Kingdom) 1948 London	1	0	0	0	0	–
(Finland) 1952 Helsinki	38	0	0	1	1	43
(Australia) 1956 Melbourne	19	0	0	0	0	–
(Italy) 1960 Rome	17	0	0	1	1	44
(Japan) 1964 Tokyo	16	0	0	0	0	–
1968 Mexico City	36	1	0	0	1	30
(West Germany) 1972 Munich	26	0	0	0	0	–
(Canada) 1976 Montreal	36	0	1	0	1	35
(Soviet Union) 1980 Moscow	48	0	1	0	1	33
(United States) 1984 Los Angeles	26	0	0	3	3	41
(South Korea) 1988 Seoul	18	0	0	0	0	–
(Spain) 1992 Barcelona	36	0	0	0	0^{[A]}	–
(United States) 1996 Atlanta	39	0	0	0	0	–
(Australia) 2000 Sydney	51	0	0	0	0	–
(Greece) 2004 Athens	48	0	0	2	2	68
(China) 2008 Beijing	110	0	0	1	1	86
(United Kingdom) 2012 London	69	1	0	0	1	50
(Brazil) 2016 Rio de Janeiro	87	0	2	1	3	65
(Japan) 2020 Tokyo	44	1	3	0	4	46
(France) 2024 Paris	33	0	0	0	0	–
(United States) 2028 Los Angeles	future event					
(Australia) 2032 Brisbane	future event					
Total		3	7	9	19	82

=== Medals by Summer Youth Olympics ===
Games	Athletes	Gold	Silver	Bronze	Total	Rank
2010 Singapore	63	0	2	3	5	63
(China) 2014 Nanjing	59	0	6	2	8	53
(Argentina) 2018 Buenos Aires	53	2	0	0	2	39
Total		2	8	5	15	54

=== Medals by Winter Games ===
Games	Athletes	Gold	Silver	Bronze	Total	Rank
(Japan) 1998 Nagano	1	0	0	0	0	–
(United States) 2002 Salt Lake City	4	0	0	0	0	–
(Italy) 2006 Turin	1	0	0	0	0	–
(Canada) 2010 Vancouver	did not participate					
(Russia) 2014 Sochi	1	0	0	0	0	–
(South Korea) 2018 Pyeongchang	did not participate					
(China) 2022 Beijing	did not participate					
(Italy) 2026 Milano Cortina	1	0	0	0	0	–
(France) 2030 French Alps	future event					
(United States) 2034 Utah	future event					
Total		0	0	0	0	–

=== Medals by summer sport ===
Sports	Gold	Silver	Bronze	Total	Rank
Boxing	1	3	2	6	33
Athletics	1	1	1	3	62
Fencing	1	0	0	1	27
Weightlifting	0	2	1	3	50
Cycling	0	1	1	2	37
Taekwondo	0	0	2	2	35
Shooting	0	0	1	1	68
Swimming	0	0	1	1	56
Total	3	7	9	19	75

=== Medals by Gender ===
Gender	Gold	Silver	Bronze	Total
Men	2	6	6	14
Women	1	1	3	5
Mixed	0	0	0	0
Total	3	7	9	19

== List of medalists ==
=== Summer Olympics ===
Medal	Name	Games	Sport	Event
Bronze	Asnoldo Devonish	(Finland) 1952 Helsinki	Athletics	Men's triple jump
Bronze	Enrico Forcella	(Italy) 1960 Rome	Shooting	Men's 50-metre rifle prone
Gold	Francisco Rodríguez	1968 Mexico City	Boxing	Men's light flyweight
Silver	Pedro Gamarro	(Canada) 1976 Montreal	Boxing	Men's welterweight
Silver	Bernardo Piñango	(Soviet Union) 1980 Moscow	Boxing	Men's bantamweight
Bronze	Marcelino Bolívar	(United States) 1984 Los Angeles	Boxing	Men's light flyweight
Bronze	Omar Catari	(United States) 1984 Los Angeles	Boxing	Men's featherweight
Bronze	Rafael Vidal	(United States) 1984 Los Angeles	Swimming	Men's 200-metre butterfly
Bronze	Adriana Carmona	(Greece) 2004 Athens	Taekwondo	Women's +67 kg
Bronze	Israel Jose Rubio	(Greece) 2004 Athens	Weightlifting	Men's 62 kg
Bronze	Dalia Contreras	(China) 2008 Beijing	Taekwondo	Women's 49 kg
Gold	Rubén Limardo	(United Kingdom) 2012 London	Fencing	Men's épée
Silver	Yulimar Rojas	(Brazil) 2016 Rio de Janeiro	Athletics	Women's triple jump
Silver	Yoel Finol	(Brazil) 2016 Rio de Janeiro	Boxing	Men's flyweight
Bronze	Stefany Hernández	(Brazil) 2016 Rio de Janeiro	Cycling	Women's BMX
Gold	Yulimar Rojas	(Japan) 2020 Tokyo	Athletics	Women's triple jump
Silver	Julio Mayora	(Japan) 2020 Tokyo	Weightlifting	Men's 73 kg
Silver	Keydomar Vallenilla	(Japan) 2020 Tokyo	Weightlifting	Men's 96 kg
Silver	Daniel Dhers	(Japan) 2020 Tokyo	Cycling	Men's BMX freestyle

=== Multiple medalists ===
Athlete	Sport	Games	Gold	Silver	Bronze	Total
Yulimar Rojas	Athletics	2016, 2020	1	1	0	2

=== Most successful Olympian progression ===
This table shows how the designation of most successful Venezuelan Olympian has progressed over time.

Athlete	Sport	Date	Gender	1st place, gold medalist(s)	2nd place, silver medalist(s)	3rd place, bronze medalist(s)	Total
Asnoldo Devonish	Athletics	23 July 1952	M	0	0	1	1
Enrico Forcella	Shooting	1960	M	0	0	1	1
Francisco Rodríguez	Boxing	October 1968	M	1	0	0	1
Rubén Limardo	Fencing	2012	M	1	0	0	1
Yulimar Rojas	Athletics	1 August 2021	F	1	1	0	2

== Notes ==
- ^{A} Venezuela won two demonstration medals in taekwondo (one gold and one bronze) at the 1992 Summer Olympics. As a demonstration sport, the medals are not recognized as Olympic medals by the International Olympic Committee; the Venezuelan Taekwondo Federation says that the 1992 medals are recognized and lists them among the nation's taekwondo medals, but all other countries and athletes who received medals in the sport in 1992 do not recognize their own medals, and do not count them toward the all-time total of medals of their respective countries. For accuracy and consistency, those of Venezuela are not counted.

== See also ==
- List of flag bearers for Venezuela at the Olympics
- Category:Olympic competitors for Venezuela
- Venezuela at the Paralympics
- Tropical nations at the Winter Olympics
