= TNT Sports (Chile) =

Chilean pay television channel

TNT Sports Chile
- Country: Chile
- Broadcast area: National (international via TV Chile)

Ownership
- Owner: TNT Sports International (Skydance Corporation)
- Key people: Jorge Carey Carvallo (Warnermedia Chile executive chairman); Joel Whitten Richardson (WarnerMedia Latin America Networks president)
- Sister channels: TNT; TNT Series; TNT Sports (Argentina); TNT Sports (Brazil); TNT Sports (United Kingdom)

History
- Launched: July 20, 2003 (as CDF); January 17, 2021 (as TNT Sports)
- Former names: CDF (2003–2021)

Links
- Website: www.tntsports.cl

Availability

Streaming media
- Estadio TNT Sports: Watch live

TNT Sports Chile is a privately owned sports pay TV channel of Chile. It launched in 2003 and it was controlled by the Asociación Nacional de Fútbol Profesional, the Chilean football league after of the authorization of sale by the FNE (Fiscalia Nacional Económica) in Chile. Now is operated by Skydance Corporation under their TNT Sports International unit. Originally called CDF (acronym of Canal del Fútbol), it was renamed on January 17, 2021.

== History ==
Created at the beginning of 2003 to broadcast the national championship after the ANFP finalized contracts with Fox Sports, the SKY satellite signal, and National Television of Chile, the latter did not reach a new agreement. This decision led in not pursuing a bidding process. The ANFP leadership headed by Reinaldo Sánchez decided to execute the proposal by businessman Jorge Claro where all 32 professional football clubs obtain all the benefits of a collective bargaining agreement from television broadcasting rights. This meant without an intermediary whom Claro was directly the negotiator in a desperate attempt to restore the Chilean game in financial constraints.

At first, it was projected that the channel would be available through cable operators and UHF signal decoders upon payment of a monthly fee. However, the decision was made to launch its own satellite television operator, Zap, in December 2003. In addition to operating on cable television. Four years later in 2007, Zap was acquired by Mexican telecommunications consortium Telmex, and so it happened to be called Telmex TV.

From 2006, the "CDF Básico" signal is renamed from its maiden channel to "CDF Premium". Four matches per round of the First Division championship were broadcast live and exclusively and selected matches of the Chilean National Team were added in the same programming.

The "Canal del Fútbol" or Channel of Soccer continued to grow and broadcast the entire fixtures of the Chilean First and Second Division championships, that is, all matches live and exclusive. In addition it was broadcasting television football programs with content on the European game and other sports. From 2007 onwards, CDF acquired the rights to broadcast the FIFA 2010 South Africa World Cup qualifiers of the CONMEBOL or South America zone. This contract proved successful with the broadcasting of all matches headed Marcelo Bielsa and "La Roja".

As the rights owner, CDF had the authority to operate the rights to broadcast all goal replays, something unprecedented in Chile until 2005. That year, mainstream network Canal 13 won a legal action against all other channels to protect the rights of information regarding goals footage. Nevertheless, the court verdict was favorable towards CDF. Canal 13 exclusively showed the replay of all the action and goals scored during the weekend fixtures until Sunday midnight. The rest of the channels was legally allowed to cover goals in an informative manner. For all other television programs, the option to pay a fee to CDF to broadcast the goals was ordered due to the court sentencing.

In 2007 after failed attempt of a collective purchase by Televisión Nacional de Chile (TVN), Chilevisión and Mega, the latter a private network adjudged the compact rights of match footage to be shown on Sundays. The decree also stated that all other television channels will be able to only exhibit the goals during 7 days as of Monday subsequent to the date of the match fixture played, under the same conditions from that of 2005. The agreement was until the end of 2008. This in spite of countless efforts and promises by the new ANFP president Harold Mayne-Nicholls to obtain the tv footage rights of the goals for all free-to-air public networks.

In January 2021, TNT Sports acquired CDF and was rebranded. TNT Sports is available via cable or satellite.

== Sports coverage ==
=== Football (On TNT Sports) ===
- FIFA Club World Cup (all eight matches live in 2019 and 2020 editions, also available for Argentina viewers)
- Chilean Primera División (Eight matches per matchday are broadcast live on TNT Sports HD & TNT Sports 2 (Premium signals) or TNT Sports 3 (Basic signal)) (Match Simulcast live on CDF Básico).
- Primera B (Five matches per matchday are broadcast live on TNT Sports HD & TNT Sports 2 (Premium signals) or TNT Sports 3 (Basic signal)) (Match simulcast live on TNT Sports 3).
- Finals of Third Division (Matches of 1st Leg and 2nd Leg are broadcast live on TNT Sports HD & TNT Sports 2 (Premium signals) or TNT Sports 3 (Basic signal)).
- FIFA World Cup qualification (CONMEBOL : All the games)
- Copa América

== Programs ==
- TNT Data Sports
- Todos Somos Técnicos
- Goals of First División (Campeonato Nacional de Primera A)
- Goals of Second División (Campeonato Nacional de Primera B)
- Pelota Parada
- TNT Data Sports Primera B
- TNT Sports REACTS
- Show de Goles
- No Es Para Tanto
- La Previa

== Notable members ==
- Claudio Palma

== Current members ==
- Alejandro Lorca

== Former members ==
- Marcelo González Godoy
- Juan Carlos Villalta
- Pablo Flamm
- Dante Poli
- Claudio Borghi

== See also ==
- Television in Chile
