= Marco Felder =

Liechtenstein luger (born 1974)

Personal information
- Nationality: Liechtenstein
- Born: 3 December 1974 (age 50)

Sport
- Sport: Luge

Marco Felder (born 3 December 1974) is a Liechtensteiner luger. He competed in the men's singles event at the 1994 Winter Olympics.
