= Bermuda at the 2006 Winter Olympics =

- IOC code: BER
- NOC: Bermuda Olympic Association
- Website: www.olympics.bm

in Turin
- Competitors: 1 in 1 sport
- Flag bearers: Patrick Singleton (opening and closing)
- Medals: Gold 0 Silver 0 Bronze 0 Total 0

Winter Olympics appearances (overview)
- 1992; 1994; 1998; 2002; 2006; 2010; 2014; 2018; 2022–2026

Bermuda sent a delegation to compete at the 2006 Winter Olympics in Turin, Italy from 10–26 February 2006. The Bermudian delegation consisted of a single athlete, skeleton racer Patrick Singleton. This was Bermuda's fifth Winter Olympic Games and Singleton's third consecutive Olympics as the only Bermudian athlete. In his event he came in 19th place.

== Background ==
Bermuda first participated in Olympic competition at the 1936 Berlin Summer Games, made their Winter Olympic Games debut in 1992 at the Albertville Games; and have appeared in every Olympics since their respective debuts bar one, the boycotted 1980 Summer Olympics in Moscow. The only medal the territory has won so far is a bronze in the sport of boxing at the 1976 Summer Olympics. The only competitor Bermuda sent to Turin was Patrick Singleton, a skeleton racer. He was the flag bearer for both the opening ceremony and the closing ceremony.

== Skeleton ==
Patrick Singleton, who was 31 years old at the time of the Turin Olympics, was the lone athlete representing Bermuda for a third consecutive games. He had previously raced luge for Bermuda at the 1998 and 2002 Winter Olympics. The skeleton race consisted of two runs, Singleton completed the first run in one minute and six one-hundredths of a second, after which he was in 22nd place. In his second run, he posted a time of 59.75 seconds, which saw him finish the event in 19th place.

Athlete	Event	Final			
Athlete	Event	Run 1	Run 2	Total	Rank
Patrick Singleton	Men's	1:00.06	59.75	1:59.81	19

== See also ==
- Bermuda at the 2006 Commonwealth Games
