= Yann Fricheteau =

French luger (born 1979)

Personal information
- Nationality: French
- Born: 14 June 1979 (age 45); Neuville-aux-Bois, France

Sport
- Sport: Luge

Yann Fricheteau (born 14 June 1979) is a French former luger. He competed in the men's singles event at the 2002 Winter Olympics.
