= Bermuda at the 1998 Winter Olympics =

- IOC code: BER
- NOC: Bermuda Olympic Association
- Website: www.olympics.bm

in Nagano
- Competitors: 1 (man) in 1 sport
- Flag bearer: John Hoskins
- Medals: Gold 0 Silver 0 Bronze 0 Total 0

Winter Olympics appearances (overview)
- 1992; 1994; 1998; 2002; 2006; 2010; 2014; 2018; 2022–2026

Bermuda sent a delegation to compete at the 1998 Winter Olympics in Nagano, Japan from 7–22 February 1998. This marked the territory's third appearance at a Winter Olympic Games with their first coming in the 1992 Albertville Games. Bermuda's delegation consisted of a single athlete, the luge competitor Patrick Singleton. In the men's singles, he came in 27th place.

== Background ==
Bermuda first participated in Olympic competition at the 1936 Berlin Summer Games, made their Winter Olympic Games debut in 1992 at the Albertville Games, and have appeared in every Olympics since their respective debuts bar one, the boycotted 1980 Summer Olympics in Moscow. The only medal the territory has won so far is a bronze in the sport of boxing at the 1976 Summer Olympics in Montreal The 1998 Winter Olympics were held from 7–22 February 1998; a total of 2,176 athletes represented 72 National Olympic Committees. This was the third time Bermuda had participated in a Winter Olympics. The Bermudian delegation to Nagano consisted of a single luge athlete, Patrick Singleton.

== Competitors ==
The following is the list of number of competitors in the Games.

Sport	Men	Women	Total
Luge	1	0	1
Total	1	0	1

== Luge ==
Singleton was 23 years old at the time of the Nagano Olympics, and was making his Olympic debut. The men's singles competition in luge was a four run race, held over two days, 8–9 February, with two runs on each day, and the sum of all four run times determining the final positions. On the first day, Singleton completed his first run in 51.434 seconds, and his second run in 51.579 seconds. Overnight, Singleton sat in 28th place out of 33 competitors. The next day, he completed his third run in 51.839 seconds, and his fourth in 52.243 seconds, meaning he had gotten slower in each successive run. Singleton's final time was 3 minutes and 27.095 seconds, which put him in 27th position. The gold medal was won by Georg Hackl of Germany in 3 minutes and 18.436 seconds, the silver medal was won by Italy's Armin Zöggeler, and the bronze by German Jens Müller.

Athlete	Run 1		Run 2		Run 3		Run 4		Total	
Athlete	Time	Rank	Time	Rank	Time	Rank	Time	Rank	Time	Rank
Patrick Singleton	51.434	26	51.579	28	51.839	26	52.243	28	3:27.095	27
