= Aleksey Gorlachov =

Russian luger (born 1981)

Personal information
- Nationality: Russian
- Born: 6 May 1981 (age 44); Bratsk, Russia

Sport
- Sport: Luge

Aleksey Gorlachov (born 6 May 1981) is a Russian luger. He competed in the men's singles event at the 2002 Winter Olympics.
