= Juan Carlos Villalta =

Chilean Journalist

- Born: Juan Carlos Villalta Atlagic; 29 December 1944 (age 81); Antofagasta, Chile
- Education: Universidad de Chile (BA in Journalism) (MA in Laws)
- Occupations: Journalist, politician
- Political party: Close to Radical Party (2020)

Juan Carlos Villalta Atlagic (born 29 December 1944) is a Chilean journalist and sports commentator who was awarded with the Sports Journalism National Prize in 2017.

== Biography ==
On 25 January 2019, he was released from Canal del Fútbol (CDF), where he worked since its beginnings in 2000s.

In 2015, he criticized to Chile Films in virtue of its workers' situation (despite his good relation with its CEO Cristian Varela).

In 2017, he was criticized by Chilean goalkeeper Nicolás Peric, who was supported by SIFUP (Chilean footballers union).

== Political career ==
In 2019, during 2019–20 protests, he expressed his «fear» of «a new confrontation between Chileans as during Popular Unity» against Chilean Armed Forces which had as result the 1973 coup d'État and Augusto Pinochet dictatorship.

In 2020, it was reported that he will run a pre-candidacy for Papudo mayor. Finally, after losing mayor primaries, it was confirmed that he will run as alderman.
