= Lee Chang-yong (luger) =

South Korean luger (born 1985)

Personal information
- Nationality: South Korean
- Born: 15 February 1985 (age 40); Seoul, South Korea

Sport
- Sport: Luge

Lee Chang-yong (born 15 February 1985) is a South Korean luger. He competed in the men's singles event at the 2002 Winter Olympics.
