= Michelle Despain =

Argentine-American luge athlete (born 1984)

Personal information
- Full name: Michelle Despain Hoeger
- Born: 5 November 1984 (age 41) Rosario, Argentina
- Spouse: Chris Hoeger

Sport
- Country: Argentina
- Sport: Luge

Michelle Despain Hoeger (born 5 November 1984) is an Argentine-American luge athlete who competed for Argentina in the 2006 Winter Olympics. Her husband is Chris Hoeger.

Despain, whose mother is from Argentina and father is from Utah, was born in Rosario, Argentina and grew up in Provo, Utah. Despain is a Latter-day Saint.

Despain worked for Isagenix, a consumer products firm in Chandler, Arizona, in the customer service department. Her father is vice president of marketing for the company. She graduated with an associate degree from Utah Valley State College in 2004 and a Bachelor of Science in Psychology from Brigham Young University in 2006.

Despain has been competing in the luge since 2003 at the age of 19. She finished 29th in the women's singles event at the 2005 FIL World Luge Championships in Park City, Utah. She finished 24th of 32 competitors in the women's singles event at the 2006 Winter Olympics in Turin, Italy.
