= Lee Hak-jin =

South Korean luger (born 1985)

Personal information
- Nationality: South Korean
- Born: 20 August 1985 (age 39); Gimcheon, South Korea

Sport
- Sport: Luge

Lee Hak-jin (born 20 August 1985) is a South Korean luger. He competed in the men's singles event at the 2002 Winter Olympics in which he placed 36th.
