= Nicolas Claveau-Laviolette =

Venezuelan cross-country skier (born 2005)

Nicolás Claveau-Laviolette
Personal information
- Full name: Nicolás Luis Claveau Laviolette
- Citizenship: Canada; Venezuela
- Born: 25 June 2005 (age 21) Lechería, Anzoátegui, Venezuela
- Home town: Lévis, Quebec, Canada

Sport
- Sport: Cross-country skiing

Nicolás Luis Claveau-Laviolette (born 25 June 2005) is a Venezuelan and Canadian cross-country skier from Quebec. He represented Venezuela at the 2026 Winter Olympics.

== Early life ==
Nicolás Luis Claveau Laviolette was born in Lechería, Anzoátegui, Venezuela, on 25 June 2005 to Québécois parents who were living in the eastern state of Venezuela due to his father's job. His family left the country when he was two years old, and he did not return until 2026. He grew up in Lévis, Quebec, Canada and has dual Canadian and Venezuelan citizenship. He also briefly lived in Peru as a child, and retained some knowledge of Spanish before representing Venezuela.

== Career ==
Claveau-Laviolette competes in cross-country skiing. He skis for Université Laval in Quebec, where he studies civil engineering. He was one of 12 student-athletes at the university to compete at the 2026 Winter Olympics.

At the youth level, Claveau-Laviolette began representing Canada in 2021. After failing to make Canadian national teams, Claveau-Laviolette looked into his birth nation and wrote to the Venezuelan Ski Federation in 2024.

He met Olympic qualifying standards in 2025 and then planned to return to Venezuela to acquire a passport, though his travel became uncertain with no-fly rules imposed when the United States intervened in Venezuela in January 2026. He managed to fly to Caracas for his passport; he spent a week there to formalize everything, being "permanently accompanied" by Venezuelan Olympic Committee president María Soto. He represented and was the flagbearer for Venezuela at the 2026 Winter Olympics, as the sole competitor from the country and its first Winter Olympian in twelve years. Speaking to Canadian media before the Games, he said he did not expect to get near the podium, but wanted to represent Venezuela and give them someone there (becoming only the sixth ever Venezuelan Winter Olympian) as well as experience the Olympics.

While in Caracas to renew his documents, Claveau-Laviolette made television talk show appearances, becoming quickly recognizable in the nation.
