= Venezuela at the 2014 Winter Olympics =

- IOC code: VEN
- NOC: Venezuelan Olympic Committee
- Website: cov.com.ve (in Spanish)

in Sochi
- Competitors: 1 in 1 sport
- Flag bearers: Antonio Jose Pardo Andretta (opening and closing)
- Medals: Gold 0 Silver 0 Bronze 0 Total 0

Winter Olympics appearances (overview)
- 1998; 2002; 2006; 2010; 2014; 2018–2022; 2026

Venezuela competed at the 2014 Winter Olympics in Sochi, Russia from 7 to 23 February 2014. The team consisted of one athlete in alpine skiing. This marks the country's return to the Winter Olympics after missing the previous games four years ago.

== Competitors ==
| Sport | Men | Women | Total |
|---|---|---|---|
| Alpine skiing | 1 | 0 | 1 |
| Total | 1 | 0 | 1 |

== Alpine skiing ==
According to the quota allocation released on January 20, 2014 Venezuela had qualified one athlete. Pardo is the fifth ever Venezuelan to ever qualify for the Winter Olympics and the first ever to qualify in a snow sport. Pardo entered the opening ceremony showing of his dance moves, which set off a social media buzz.

Pardo was the final starter in a field of 109 athletes in the giant slalom and quickly crashed after starting the race, thus receiving an official status of did not finish the race. Pardo summarized the race as, "it was not my fault,... one of the skis just fell off. If it was my fault, well...nothing I can do. But something that really doesn't belong to me is kind of upsetting".

| Athlete | Event | Run 1 | | Run 2 | | Total | |
| Athlete | Event | Time | Rank | Time | Rank | Time | Rank |
|---|---|---|---|---|---|---|---|
| Antonio Jose Pardo Andretta | Men's giant slalom | DNF | | | | | |

== See also ==
- Venezuela at the 2014 Summer Youth Olympics
