= Nedžad Lomigora =

Bosnian luger (born 1971)

Personal information
- Nationality: Bosnian
- Born: 27 August 1971 (age 53); Sarajevo, SR Bosnia and Herzegovina, SFR Yugoslavia

Sport
- Sport: Luge

Nedžad Lomigora (born 27 August 1971) is a Bosnian luger. He competed in the men's singles event at the 1994 Winter Olympics.
