= Marcelo González Godoy =

Chilean journalist and sports commentator

Marcelo González
- Born: Marcelo Alejandro González Godoy; 18 December 1963 (age 62); Coquimbo, Chile
- Education: Chilean School of Announcers (1983); University of Santiago de Chile (1998–2003)
- Occupations: Journalist, commentator
- Years active: 1981–present
- Known for: Work at: Canal 8 UCV TV (1981–1991); Radio Agricultura (1981–1991); Radio Gigante; Radio Nacional de Chile; Megavisión (–1996); Canal 13 (1997–2010); Radio Futuro; Radio Horizonte; Radio Beethoven; Radio Oasis; Radio Imagina; Canal del Fútbol (2003–2008); Canal del Deporte Olímpico (2011–present); Chilevisión (2018); Televisión Nacional de Chile (2020)

Marcelo Alejandro González Godoy (born 18 December 1963) is a Chilean journalist and sports commentator.

He is commonly known for his play-by-play narrations in Canal del Fútbol (CDF), Canal del Deporte Olímpico (CDO) and Chilevisión (CHV); in this last one he related Chile women's national football team campaign during 2018 Copa América Femenina, where these national team achieved a historical second place after being final phase's runner-up under Brazil. He is also known for presenting Teletrece's newscast.

== Biography ==
=== Childhood and adolescence: 1963–1981 ===
The son of cab driver and community director Mario González, and school principal Gladys Godoy, Marcelo has been linked to football since his childhood. He has been strongly influenced by his grandfather Juan Guillermo Godoy, amateur footballer who was one of the first members of the Coquimbo regional team. He began his studies at School Number 5 and later attended A8 Lyceum.

After high school, his initial goal was to study theater, but his and his family's economical complications prevented him from pursuing this option. Regarding it, he said: "When I finished my secondary education, in those years I performed the PAA —Prueba de Aptitud Académica— and I qualified to study theater in Santiago, but due to financial problems I couldn't study". Even so, he worked to pay for an English course to support his own projects in communications. He presented proposals to different media stations until being accepted by Canal 8 UCV TV in 1981, thereby starting his career at 18.

=== Rise in media: 1981–2003 ===
Once at UCV TV, he worked at the local station for La Serena (near his native Coquimbo). There, he presented a proposal to create a program on Fiestas Patrias (Homeland Holidays), which was well received by the board.

At the same time, González began a career in radio, where he worked at a regional level for almost five years, participating in programs such as Radio Agricultura and Radio Amistad. In 1991, González decided to take a new opportunity in Santiago, the capital of Chile, where his voice was already known. He broadcast the program "Los Gigantes del Deporte" (Sports Giants) alongside personalities like Wladimiro Mimica, Eduardo Bonvallet, Carlos Caszely and Héctor Vega Onesime. This platform allowed him to be discovered by football commentator, Milton Millas, with whom he became close friends during their work at Radio Nacional, about which González states:

After working with Wladimiro, it appeared Milton Millas, with whom I had already shared some interviews in Coquimbo Region and invited me to work with him in then program Más Deporte ("More Sports"), which had one of the greatest tunes in the country (...) and where I worked with Elías Figueroa, Sergio Livingstone and Alberto Fouillioux. In that time, Milton began to lead Megavisión sports area and called me to being part of it as a sports reporter to continue, at the same time, consolidating myself in radio to be the voice of main newscasts.

In 1998, he left Megavisión and joined Canal 13. The same year, and with a sufficient budget from his media work, he started studying journalism at the University of Santiago de Chile, where he graduated from in 2003.

=== Professional career: 2003–present ===
==== CDF Era: 2003–2008 ====
In 2008, he left CDF.

==== Post-CDF Era: 2018–present ====
In 2018, it was reported that WarnerMedia hired him to broadcast the 2018 Copa América Femenina as play-by-play commentator alongside color commentators Fernando Tapia, Javiera Naranjo and Magdalena Grant.

In 2020, González related the 2020 Women's Primera División de Chile Final between Santiago Morning and Universidad de Chile – won by Morning – that was broadcast by Televisión Nacional de Chile. There, he was accompanied by color commentators Gustavo Huerta and Yoselin Fernández.

== Points of view ==
=== Coquimbo–Serena rivalry ===
He thinks the rivalry between fans of Deportes La Serena and Coquimbo Unido is not positive for the region.
