= Roger White (luger) =

Australian luger (born 1965)

Personal information
- Nationality: Australian
- Born: 31 August 1965 (age 59); Wollongong, New South Wales, Australia

Sport
- Sport: Luge

Roger White (born 31 August 1965) is an Australian luger. He competed in the men's singles event at the 1994 Winter Olympics.
