= Bermuda at the 2014 Winter Olympics =

- IOC code: BER
- NOC: Bermuda Olympic Association
- Website: www.olympics.bm

in Sochi
- Competitors: 1 in 1 sport
- Flag bearer: Tucker Murphy
- Medals: Gold 0 Silver 0 Bronze 0 Total 0

Winter Olympics appearances (overview)
- 1992; 1994; 1998; 2002; 2006; 2010; 2014; 2018; 2022; 2026

Bermuda sent a delegation to compete at the 2014 Winter Olympics in Sochi, Russia, from 7–23 February 2014. This was Bermuda's seventh appearance at a Winter Olympic Games, and cross-country skier Tucker Murphy's second consecutive Games as the only athlete. In the 15 kilometre race, he finished in 84th place.

== Background ==
Bermuda first appeared in Olympic competition at the 1936 Berlin Summer Games, and debuted in the Winter Olympic Games at the 1992 Albertville Games. They have appeared in every Olympics since their respective debuts bar one; they were one of 54 nations who boycotted the 1980 Summer Olympics in Moscow. The only medal the territory has won so far is a bronze in the sport of boxing at the 1976 Summer Olympics. The Bermudian delegation consisted of one cross-country skier, Tucker Murphy. This was Murphy's second consecutive Olympics as Bermuda's only representative. Despite the terrorist threats on the Sochi Olympics, there were no plans to withdraw unless Murphy felt unsafe, and the delegation ultimately competed as scheduled. The delegation marched in the opening ceremony with their traditional Bermuda shorts. Murphy was selected as the flag bearer for the opening ceremony, while a ceremony volunteer carried the flag for the closing ceremony.

== Cross-country skiing ==
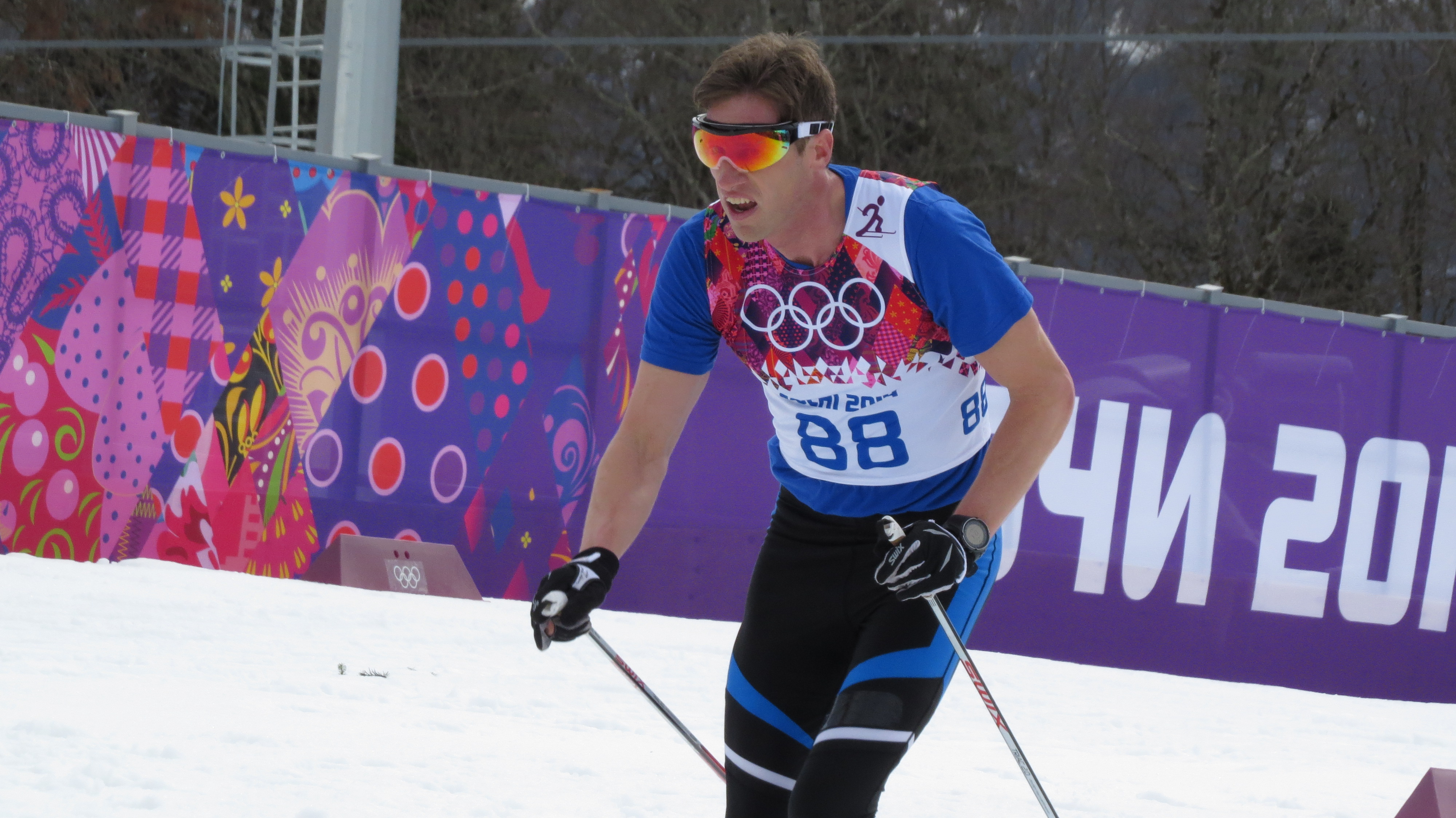
Tucker Murphy skis at the 2014 Winter Olympics

The final quota allocations were released on January 20, 2014, and Bermuda had one athlete eligible for qualification. Tucker Murphy qualified for the Olympics by meeting the "B" standard time at an event in Chamonix, France in January 2014. He was 32 years old at the time of the Sochi Olympics. Murphy finished his only race, the 15 kilometre freestyle, in 84th position with a time of 49 minutes and 19 seconds, improving on his 88th-place finish four years prior. Four years later, Murphy would again represent Bermuda at the 2018 Winter Olympics.

Distance

| Athlete | Event | Final | | |
| Athlete | Event | Time | Deficit | Rank |
|---|---|---|---|---|
| Tucker Murphy | Men's 15 km classical | 49:19.9 | +10:50.2 | 84 |

== See also ==
- Bermuda at the 2014 Commonwealth Games
- Bermuda at the 2014 Summer Youth Olympics
