= Alexander Bau =

German luger (born 1970)

Personal information
- Nationality: German
- Born: 17 April 1970 (age 55) Breitenbrunn, East Germany

Sport
- Sport: Luge

Alexander Bau (born 17 April 1970) is a German luger. He competed in the men's singles event at the 1994 Winter Olympics.
