= Nauris Skraustiņš =

Latvian luger (born 1978)

Personal information
- Nationality: Latvian
- Born: 12 September 1978 (age 46); Riga, Latvia

Sport
- Sport: Luge

Nauris Skraustiņš (born 12 September 1978) is a Latvian luger. He competed in the men's singles event at the 2002 Winter Olympics.
