= Chris Hoeger =

Venezuelan luger

Personal information
- Full name: Christopher David Hoeger
- Born: 15 January 1985 (age 41) Odessa, Texas, United States
- Spouse: Michelle Despain

Sport
- Country: Venezuela
- Sport: Luge

Christopher David Hoeger (born 15 January 1985) is an American-born luger who competed for Venezuela in the men's singles event at the 2002 Winter Olympics, placing 31st. His wife is Michelle Despain and his father is Werner Hoeger.

== Career ==
Hoeger got into luge following his father encouraging him to join him in a street luge circuit. He started to compete on the Luge World Cup circuit whilst still a student, often having to email his homework back to school from Europe. Hoeger considered quitting after three years but was encouraged by his mother to continue. Despite only having visited Venezuela once when he was five, he was eligible to represent the country at the Olympics due to his father having been born there.

At the 2002 Winter Olympics, Hoeger competed against his father, who was representing the United States, in the men's luge competition. In doing so, they became the first father and son to compete against each other in the same event at the Olympics. In the event, Hoeger beat his father by finishing 31st in the competition whilst Werner finished 40th. Hoeger opted not to attempt to qualify for the luge at the 2006 Winter Olympics.

== Personal life ==
Hoeger was born in Texas as the son Venezuelan professor Werner Hoeger. He used to play association football. As a child, he attended Centennial High School in Boise, Idaho. After the Olympics, he opted to become a mormon missionary in the Church of Jesus Christ of Latter Day Saints. By 2006, he was dating the Argentine fellow luger Michelle Despain.
