= Julio César Camacho =

Venezuelan luger (born 1978)

Personal information
- Born: 9 May 1978 (age 46); Maracas, Venezuela

Sport
- Sport: Luge

Julio César Camacho (born 9 May 1978) is a Venezuelan luger. He competed in the men's singles event at the 2002 Winter Olympics.
