= Paul Hix =

British luger

Personal information
- Nationality: British
- Born: 6 March 1974 (age 51)

Sport
- Sport: Luge

Paul Hix (born 6 March 1974) is a British luger. He competed in the men's singles event at the 1994 Winter Olympics.
