= Antonio José Pardo Andretta =

Venezuelan alpine skier (born 1970)

Antonio Jose Pardo Andretta
Personal information
- Born: September 8, 1970 (age 56) Caracas, Venezuela
Medal record
Alpine skiing
Representing Venezuela

Antonio Jose Pardo Andretta (born September 8, 1970 in Caracas) is an alpine skier from Venezuela. He competed for Venezuela at the 2014 Winter Olympics in the giant slalom event, placing last.

== Career ==
Pardo is the fifth ever Venezuelan to ever qualify for the Winter Olympics and the first ever to qualify in a snow sport. Pardo only started to compete competitively at the age of 43 because he became unemployed and thus had more time to compete.

Pardo Andretta was also selected to carry the Venezuelan flag during the opening ceremony. Pardo entered the opening ceremony showing of his dance moves, which set off a social media buzz. Pardo Andretta is also the president of the Venezuelan Ski federation.

Pardo was the final starter in a field of 109 athletes in the giant slalom and quickly crashed after starting the race, thus receiving an official status of did not finish the race. Pardo summarized the race as, "it was not my fault,... one of the skis just fell off. If it was my fault, well...nothing I can do. But something that really doesn't belong to me is kind of upsetting".

== See also ==
- Venezuela at the 2014 Winter Olympics
