= Julio Luna =

Julio Luna may refer to:

- Julio Luna (footballer) (born 1950), Peruvian footballer
- Julio Luna (weightlifter) (born 1973), Venezuelan weightlifter
