= Nick Sullivan (luger) =

American luger (born 1979)

Personal information
- Nationality: American
- Born: June 21, 1979 (age 47) Saint Paul, Minnesota, United States

Sport
- Sport: Luge

Nick Sullivan (born June 21, 1979) is an American luger. He competed in the men's singles event at the 2002 Winter Olympics.
