= Canal 8 UCV TV =

Former TV station in La Serena, Chile

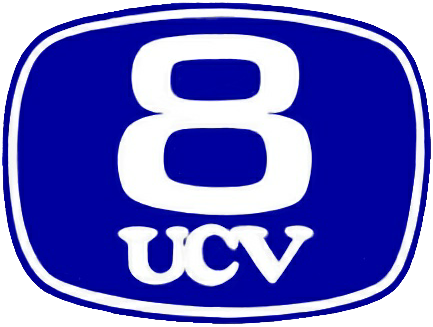
- Canal 8 UCV TV logo used from 1980 until the 1994 channel change
- La Serena; Chile
- Channels: Analog: 9 (VHF)

Ownership
- Owner: Universidad Católica de Valparaíso

History
- First air date: May 10, 1974
- Last air date: October 7, 2002
- Former channel numbers: 8 (VHF, 1971–1994)

Technical information
- Repeater: 12 (Andacollo)

Canal 8 UCV TV (later called Canal 9 UCV TV) was a Chilean free-to-air television station which operated in the Coquimbo Region between 1974 and 2002.

== History ==
=== Beginnings ===
The transmitter was activated in September 1971 as a relay for UCV TV. Canal 8 as a regional channel with local programming began on May 10, 1974, and achieved great success in La Serena and Coquimbo.

=== Consolidation ===
During the 1980s, Canal 8 had contracts with Canal 13, Teleonce and UCV TV and aired programs from all three networks as well as its own local productions, resulting in high ratings.

In the late 1980s and early 1990s, the arrival of transmitters of Canal 13 (in 1988) and Chilevisión (in 1994) left Canal 8 UCV TV without many of its highest-rated programs. As those networks pulled their programming, Canal 8 was forced to rely on programs from UCV TV in Valparaíso and on its local fare.

=== Canal 9 and the end of the signal ===
In 1994, Canal 8 UCV TV changed from channel 8 to channel 9, changing its name to Canal 9 UCV TV as a result. Reeling from the loss of viewers and trouble securing advertisers, the station quickly collapsed. Canal 9's local news program was canceled months before the station ceased broadcasting local productions on January 15, 1995, but the station never went off air, filling an eight-hour broadcast day with videos of La Serena and Coquimbo and timeshifted UCV TV programs. The station continued to air UCV TV shows, as well as some limited local programming, through 2002, under several different managers.

From 2002 to 2003, a cable channel called Thema Televisión rented the Canal 9 studio, and Canal 9 aired some of Thema's programming. The end came in 2002 when the station opted to close, in large part because UCV Televisión was about to install its own transmitter in the Coquimbo Region as part of its national expansion plan; it signed on in 2003.

== Local programs ==
- Teleocho Noticias (News, later called Ocho Visión and finally Nueve Visión)
- Vistazo Deportivo (Sports)
- Directo al Deporte (Sports)
- Nuestra Noche (Talk show)
- Desde el Café El Patio (Talk show)
- El Submarino (Entertaining)
- Hola, Hola Mujer (Miscellaneous)
- Diapasón (Music)
- Tu Música (Music)

== Logos ==
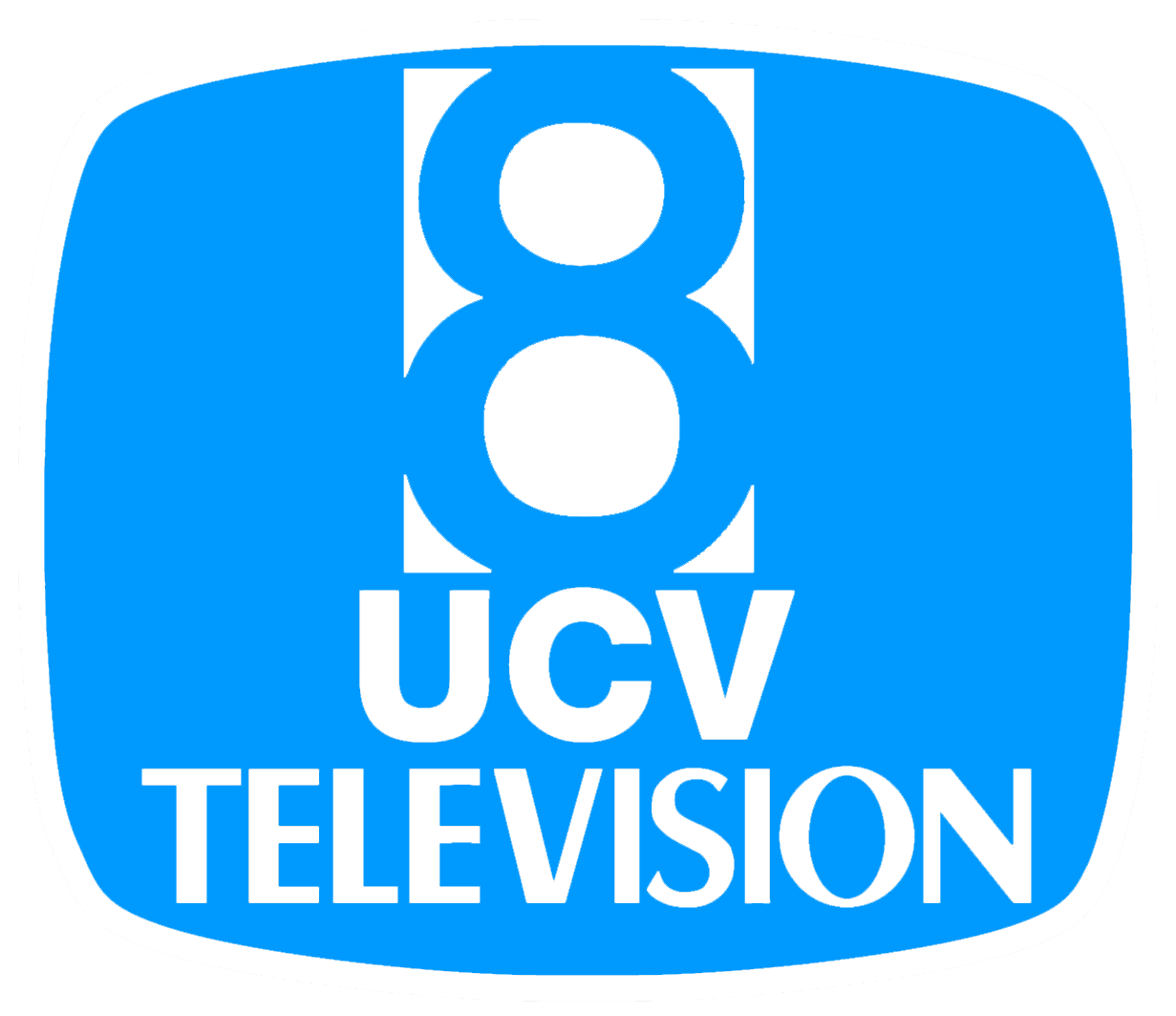
c.1974-1980

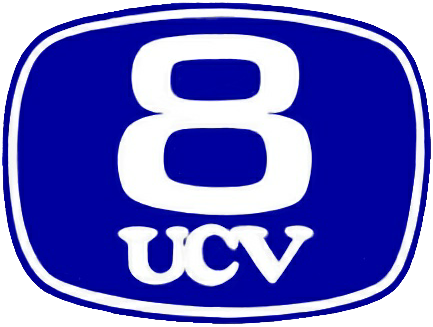
1980-1994.

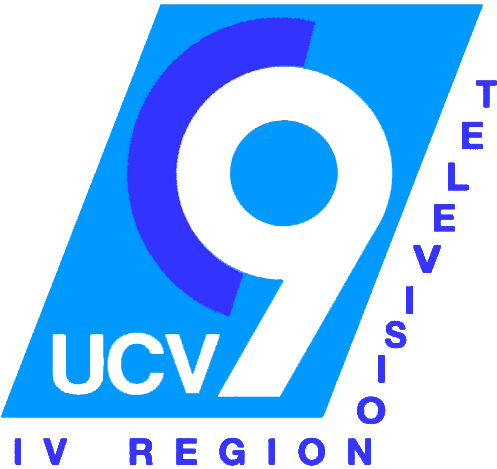
1994-1995.

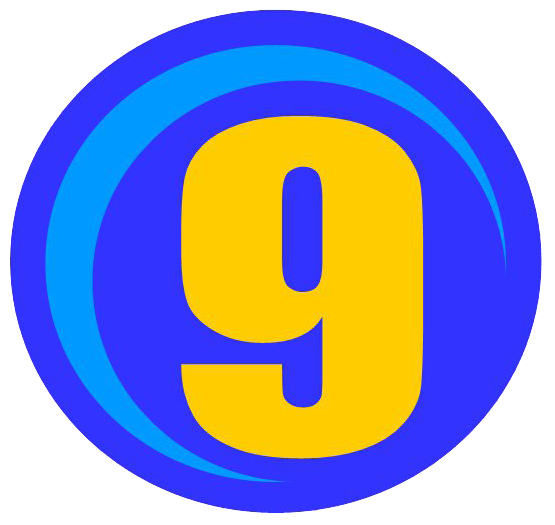
2001-2002.
