= Marcelo González (luger) =

Argentine luger (born 1965)

Personal information
- Born: 24 November 1965 (age 59); Campana, Argentina

Sport
- Sport: Luge

Marcelo González (born 24 November 1965) is an Argentine luger. He competed in the men's singles event at the 2002 Winter Olympics.
