= Michal Kvíčala =

Czech luger (born 1981)

Personal information
- Nationality: Czech
- Born: 24 January 1981 (age 44); Liberec, Czechoslovakia

Sport
- Sport: Luge

Michal Kvíčala (born 24 January 1981) is a Czech luger. He competed in the men's singles event at the 2002 Winter Olympics.
