= Reto Gilly =

Swiss luger (born 1972)

Personal information
- Nationality: Swiss
- Born: 18 January 1972 (age 53) Thusis, Switzerland

Sport
- Sport: Luge

Reto Gilly (born 18 January 1972) is a Swiss former luger. He competed at the 1994 Winter Olympics, the 1998 Winter Olympics and the 2002 Winter Olympics.
