= María Soto =

Venezuelan softball player (born 1978)

Personal information
- Full name: María José Soto Gil
- Born: 14 June 1978 (age 48) Valencia, Venezuela

Sport
- Sport: Softball
Medal record
Women's softball
Representing Venezuela
World Games
Silver medal – second place	2013 Cali	Team competition

María José Soto Gil (born June 14, 1978) is a Venezuelan softball player. Soto competed as a member and captain of the national softball team at the 2008 Summer Olympics where she was Venezuela's flag bearer in the opening ceremony.

From 2022 she is president of the Venezuelan Olympic Committee.
