= Simon Payne =

Bermudian luger (born 1964)

Personal information
- Nationality: Bermudian
- Born: 27 August 1964 (age 60); Hamilton, Bermuda

Sport
- Sport: Luge

Simon J. Payne (born 27 August 1964) is a Bermudian luger. He competed at the 1992 Winter Olympics and the 1994 Winter Olympics. He was the first person to represent Bermuda at the Winter Olympics, and later founded the Bermuda Luge Federation.
