= Werner Hoeger =

Venezuelan academic

Personal information
- Full name: Werner Walter Karl Hoeger
- Born: Mérida, Venezuela

Sport
- Country: Venezuela
- Sport: Luge

Werner Walter Karl Hoeger (born in Mérida, Venezuela) is a former luge athlete who competed for Venezuela at the 2002 Winter Olympics and the 2006 Winter Olympics. His son is Chris Hoeger. He is a professor emeritus of exercise science at Boise State University and author of nine different "fitness & wellness" textbooks. He wrote a total of 70 editions of these books. He has been one of the most widely read fitness and wellness college authors in the United States. He was the first author to write a college-level fitness book to incorporate the wellness concept with the publication of Lifetime Physical Fitness & Wellness: A Personalized Program in 1986 (16 editions, Morton/Wadsworth/Cengage Learning). His title Fitness & Wellness (Wadsworth/Cengage Learning, 2021, 15th edition) is a concise book for introductory courses and for the general public that provides the necessary guidelines to enhance health and quality of life through a comprehensive fitness and wellness program. He is a Fellow of the American College of Sports Medicine and also of the Research Consortium of AAHPERD (now SHAPE America). A gymnast in his youth, he later took up the sport of luge and participated in two Olympic Winter Games (2002 and 2006). Following his Olympic participation he turned his attention to racing in track and field, competing in three World Masters Track and Field Championships (2011, 2016, and 2018).

== Academic and professional career ==
Werner Hoeger received his Bachelor of Science degree in Physical Education and his master's degree in Exercise Science from Brigham Young University at the young age of 20. In 1978, at 24 years of age, Hoeger earned his Ed.D. in exercise physiology, also from Brigham Young University. He then taught at the University of Los Andes in Merida, Venezuela from 1978 to 1982; served as Technical Director of Fitness Monitoring in Rolling Meadows, Illinois, from 1982 to 1983; and taught at the University of Texas of the Permian Basin in Odessa from 1983 to 1986. He joined Boise State University in 1986 and retired from the university in 2009. He also taught for one semester in 2012, 2013, and 2016 at Brigham Young University Hawaii.

== Luge career ==
He took up the sport of luge five weeks before his 45th birthday. Competing in two Winter Olympics, Hoeger earned his best finish of 32nd in the men's singles event in Turin in 2006. At 52, he represented his home country of Venezuela in 2006. As their only athlete at the games, he carried their flag at the Parade of Nations. He was the oldest actual competitor at these games. At the 2002 Winter Olympics in Salt Lake City, competing alongside his son Christopher, they became the only father and son to ever compete in the same event in the Olympic Winter Games.

Hoeger's best finish at the FIL World Luge Championships was 38th in the men's singles event at Nagano in 2004.

According to the New York Times, after experiencing a concussion Hoeger warned officials of the dangers of the luge track at the Vancouver Winter Olympics before the death of Nodar Kumaritashvili.

== Personal life ==
Hoeger was born and raised in the city of Mérida, Venezuela. His Olympic aspirations started during the 1968 Summer Olympic Games in Mexico City. In 1970 at the age of 16, he made the Venezuelan National Gymnastics team and was undefeated as national all-around champion until he retired in 1976. He won 34 of 36 individual national titles during these six years. In the fall of 1970, he was recruited by Brigham Young University and competed there for four years. He aspired to compete in the 1972 Munich or the 1976 Montreal Summer Olympic Games. As the only athlete with a chance to qualify for his native Venezuela, he was never given the opportunity to try out for the games. He waited 34 years to compete in the Olympic Games. Subsequently, in 2011, he raced in the World Masters Athletics (Track and Field) Championships in Sacramento, California, US. He raced in the 800, 1,500, and 5,000 meter events. In 2015 he finished third in the mile at the USA Track and Field (USATF) Masters Indoors National Championships and placed third and fourth respectively in the 800 m and 1,500 m at the USA National Senior Games. In October/November 2016 he advanced to the finals in these two events at the World Masters Athletics Championships held in Perth, Australia and finished 7th (12 finalists) in the 800 m and 8th (16 finalists) in the 1500 m. He has received All-American recognition by USATF in 2012, 2014, 2015, 2016, 2017, 2018, 2019, 2020, and 2021.
