= Iginia Boccalandro =

Venezuelan luger

Personal information
- Full name: Iginia Boccalandro Valentina
- Born: February 14, 1961 (age 65) Caracas, Distrito Capital, Venezuela

Sport
- Country: Venezuela
- Sport: Luge

Iginia Boccalandro Valentina (born February 14, 1961, in Caracas, Distrito Capital) is a Venezuelan Olympic athlete.

== Life ==
She was born in Caracas, Venezuela, but trained in Salt Lake City in the United States. She was a volleyball player and downhill skier in Venezuela before switching careers due to chronic knee problems. In 1994, she joined a developmental luge program sponsored by the United States luge association. She took part in the 1998 and 2002 Winter Olympics, finishing 28th in luge at Nagano. Boccalandro was the first Venezuelan to participate in the Winter Olympics.

In 2002, during the Winter Games in Salt Lake City, she carried the Venezuelan flag in opening ceremonies. At the end of her first descent she lost control of her sled, having a serious accident. In one of the last curves she lost her balance and was separated from her sled. She hit both sides of the lane a number of times, but was unharmed (although she received a DNF). The accident raised questions about whether athletes from warmer climates should be allowed to participate in the Olympics under their diversity policy, highlighting the lack of training and experience that could prove a danger to safety.
