= Venezuelan Olympic Committee =

National Olympic Committee

- Country: Venezuela
- Code: VEN
- Created: 1935
- Recognized: 1935
- Continental Association: PASO
- Headquarters: Caracas, Venezuela
- President: María Soto
- Secretary General: Élida Párraga
- Website: www.cov.com.ve

The Venezuelan Olympic Committee (Spanish: Comité Olímpico Venezolano, COV) (IOC Code: VEN) is a private non-profit organization affiliated with the International Olympic Committee and other sporting associations and governs the conduct of Venezuela's athletes in events sanctioned by the International Olympic Committee (IOC), the Pan American Games and the Central American and Caribbean Games. It is based in Caracas, Venezuela.

== History ==
The Venezuelan Olympic Committee was created on 23 December 1935. and recognized by the International Olympic Committee in the same year.

== Executive committee ==
The committee of the COV is represented by:

- President: María Soto
- Vice Presidents: Marcos Oviedo, Joseba Barreda, Pedro León Torres, Pablo Machilanda
- Secretary General: Élida Párraga
- Treasurer: Arturo Castillo
- Directors: María A. Pérez, Ángel Delgado (Machile)
- President of the Honorary Council: Efraín Velásquez

== President ==
Tenure	Name
1935—1937	Roberto Pérez
1937—1938	Armando Álvarez de Lugo
1938—1942	Robert J. Todd
1942—1950	José Beracasa
1950—1954	Julio Bustamente
1954—1974	José Beracasa
1974—1978	Luis Felipe Rodríguez
1978—1980	José Beracasa
1980—19??	Luis Felipe Rodríguez
1984—2006	Fernando Romero
2006—2022	Eduardo Álvarez
2022—in carica	María Soto

== See also ==
- Venezuela at the Olympics
- Venezuela at the Paralympics
- Venezuela at the Pan American Games
- National Olympic Committee
