= List of flag bearers for Mexico at the Olympics =

Mexico at the Olympics
- IOC code: MEX
- NOC: Mexican Olympic Committee
- Website: www.com.org.mx (in Spanish)
- Medals: Gold 13 Silver 27 Bronze 37 Total 77

Summer appearances
- 1900; 1904–1920; 1924; 1928; 1932; 1936; 1948; 1952; 1956; 1960; 1964; 1968; 1972; 1976; 1980; 1984; 1988; 1992; 1996; 2000; 2004; 2008; 2012; 2016; 2020; 2024

Winter appearances
- 1928; 1932–1980; 1984; 1988; 1992; 1994; 1998; 2002; 2006; 2010; 2014; 2018; 2022; 2026

This is a list of flag bearers who have represented Mexico at the Olympics.

Mexico at the Summer Youth Olympics
- IOC code: MEX
- NOC: Comité Olímpico Mexicano
- Medals: Gold 1 Silver 8 Bronze 11 Total 20

Summer Youth Olympics appearances (overview)
- 2010; 2014; 2018

Mexico at the Winter Youth Olympics
- IOC code: MEX
- NOC: Mexican Olympic Committee
- Medals: Gold 1 Silver 0 Bronze 0 Total 1

Winter Youth Olympics appearances (overview)
- 2012; 2016; 2020; 2024

Flag bearers carry the national flag of their country at the opening ceremony of the Olympic Games.

| # | Event year | Season | Flag bearer | Sport | Ref. |
|---|---|---|---|---|---|
| 1 | 1924 | Summer | Alfredo B. Cuellar | Official | |
| 2 | 1928 | Summer | Jesús Aguirre | Athletics | |
| 3 | 1932 | Summer | Eugenia Escudero | Fencing | |
| 4 | 1936 | Summer | Tirso Hernández | Official | |
| 5 | 1948 | Summer | Francisco Bustamente | Shooting | |
| 6 | 1952 | Summer | Joaquín Capilla | Diving | |
| 7 | 1956 | Summer | Joaquín Capilla | Diving | |
| 8 | 1960 | Summer | Pilar Roldán | Fencing | |
| 9 | 1964 | Summer | Fidel Negrete | Athletics | |
| 10 | 1968 | Summer | David Bárcena | Athletics | |
| 11 | 1972 | Summer | Felipe Muñoz | Swimming | |
| 12 | 1976 | Summer | Teresa Díaz | Gymnastics | |
| 13 | 1980 | Summer | Carlos Girón | Diving | |
| 14 | 1984 | Winter | | | |
| 15 | 1984 | Summer | Ivar Sisniega | Modern Pentathlon | |
| 16 | 1988 | Winter | Riccardo Olavarrieta | Figure skating | |
| 17 | 1988 | Summer | Ernesto Canto | Athletics | |
| 18 | 1992 | Winter | Roberto Alvárez | Cross-country skiing | |
| 19 | 1992 | Summer | Jesús Mena | Diving | |
| 20 | 1994 | Winter | Hubertus von Fürstenberg-von Hohenlohe | Alpine skiing | |
| 21 | 1996 | Summer | Nancy Contreras | Cycling | |
| 22 | 2000 | Summer | Fernando Platas | Diving | |
| 23 | 2002 | Winter | Roberto Tamés | Bobsleigh | |
| 24 | 2004 | Summer | Fernando Platas | Diving | |
| 25 | 2008 | Summer | Paola Espinosa | Diving | |
| 26 | 2010 | Winter | Hubertus von Fürstenberg-von Hohenlohe | Alpine skiing | |
| 27 | 2010 | Summer Youth | Iván García | Diving | |
| 28 | 2012 | Winter Youth | Joshua Montiel | Skeleton | |
| 29 | 2012 | Summer | María Espinoza | Taekwondo | |
| 30 | 2014 | Winter | Hubertus von Fürstenberg-von Hohenlohe | Alpine skiing | |
| 31 | 2014 | Summer Youth | Alejandra Orozco | Diving | |
| 32 | 2016 | Winter Youth | Jocelyn McGillivray | Alpine skiing | |
| 33 | 2016 | Summer | Daniela Campuzano | Cycling | |
| 34 | 2018 | Winter | Germán Madrazo | Cross-country skiing | |
| 35 | 2018 | Summer Youth | Natalia Botello | Fencing | |
| 36 | 2020 | Winter Youth | Daniela Mayen | Alpine skiing | |
| 37 | 2020 | Summer | Gaby López | Golf | |
| 37 | 2020 | Summer | Rommel Pacheco | Diving | |
| 38 | 2022 | Winter | Donovan Carrillo | Figure skating | |
| 38 | 2022 | Winter | Sarah Schleper | Alpine skiing | |
| 39 | 2024 | Summer | Emiliano Hernández | Modern pentathlon | |
| 39 | 2024 | Summer | Alejandra Orozco | Diving | |
| 40 | 2026 | Winter | Donovan Carrillo | Figure skating | |
| 40 | 2026 | Winter | Sarah Schleper | Alpine skiing | |

== See also ==
- Mexico at the Olympics
