= Mexico at the 1988 Winter Olympics =

- IOC code: MEX
- NOC: Mexican Olympic Committee
- Website: www.soycom.org (in Spanish)

in Calgary
- Competitors: 11 (10 men, 1 woman) in 4 sports
- Flag bearer: Ricardo Olavarrieta (figure skating)
- Medals: Gold 0 Silver 0 Bronze 0 Total 0

Winter Olympics appearances (overview)
- 1928; 1932–1980; 1984; 1988; 1992; 1994; 1998; 2002; 2006; 2010; 2014; 2018; 2022; 2026

Mexico competed at the 1988 Winter Olympics in Calgary, Alberta, Canada.

== Competitors ==
The following is the list of number of competitors in the Games.

Sport	Men	Women	Total
Alpine skiing	4	0	4
Bobsleigh	4	–	4
Cross-country skiing	1	0	1
Figure skating	1	1	2
Total	10	1	11

== Alpine skiing ==
Men

Athlete	Event	Race 1	Race 2	Total	
Athlete	Event	Time	Time	Time	Rank
Hubertus von Fürstenberg-von Hohenlohe	Downhill			2:12.58	43
Patrice Martell	Super-G			2:10.69	53
Alex Christian Benoit	Super-G			2:05.80	49
Hubertus von Fürstenberg-von Hohenlohe	Super-G			1:56.03	42
Carlos Pruneda	Giant Slalom	DNF	–	DNF	–
Patrice Martell	Giant Slalom	n/a	DNF	DNF	–
Alex Christian Benoit	Giant Slalom	1:22.35	1:19.10	2:41.45	57
Hubertus von Fürstenberg-von Hohenlohe	Giant Slalom	1:18.86	1:15.71	2:34.57	52
Carlos Pruneda	Slalom	1:41.94	DNF	DNF	–
Alex Christian Benoit	Slalom	1:18.77	1:04.38	2:23.15	37
Hubertus von Fürstenberg-von Hohenlohe	Slalom	1:07.36	1:00.57	2:07.93	30

Men's combined

Athlete	Downhill	Slalom		Total	
Athlete	Time	Time 1	Time 2	Points	Rank
Hubertus von Fürstenberg-von Hohenlohe	1:57.42	DSQ	–	DSQ	–

== Bobsleigh ==
Sled	Athletes	Event	Run 1		Run 2		Run 3		Run 4		Total	
Sled	Athletes	Event	Time	Rank	Time	Rank	Time	Rank	Time	Rank	Time	Rank
MEX-1	Jorge Tamés; José Tamés	Two-man	1:01.58	40	1:02.39	38	1:03.44	37	1:02.67	36	4:10.08	36
MEX-2	Roberto Tamés; Luis Adrián Tamés	Two-man	1:01.56	39	1:01.84	37	1:03.76	38	1:02.93	38	4:10.09	37

== Cross-country skiing ==
Men

Event	Athlete	Race	
Event	Athlete	Time	Rank
15 km C	Roberto Alvárez	1'01:26.4	84
30 km C	Roberto Alvárez	2'09:34.8	85
50 km F	Roberto Alvárez	3'22:25.1	61

C = Classical style, F = Freestyle

== Figure skating ==
Men

Athlete	CF	SP	FS	TFP	Rank
Ricardo Olavarrieta	28	26	Did not advance		27

Women

Athlete	CF	SP	FS	TFP	Rank
Diana Encinas	28	31	Did not advance		30
