= Mexico at the 1928 Winter Olympics =

- IOC code: MEX
- NOC: Mexican Olympic Committee
- Website: www.soycom.org (in Spanish)

in St. Moritz
- Competitors: 5 in 1 sport
- Medals: Gold 0 Silver 0 Bronze 0 Total 0

Winter Olympics appearances (overview)
- 1928; 1932–1980; 1984; 1988; 1992; 1994; 1998; 2002; 2006; 2010; 2014; 2018; 2022; 2026

Mexico competed at the Winter Olympic Games for the first time in 1928 in St. Moritz, Switzerland. It would be another 56 years before another Mexican team would attend the Winter Games.

== Bobsleigh ==
Athlete	Event	Run 1		Run 2		Total	
Athlete	Event	Time	Rank	Time	Rank	Time	Rank
Lorenzo Elizaga; Mario Casasos; Genaro Díaz Raigosa; José de la Cruz Porfirio Genaro Díaz Raigosa; Juan de Landa	Five-man	1:44.9	16	1:42.8	8	3:27.7	11
