= José Díaz (bobsleigh) =

Mexican bobsledder (1907–1988)

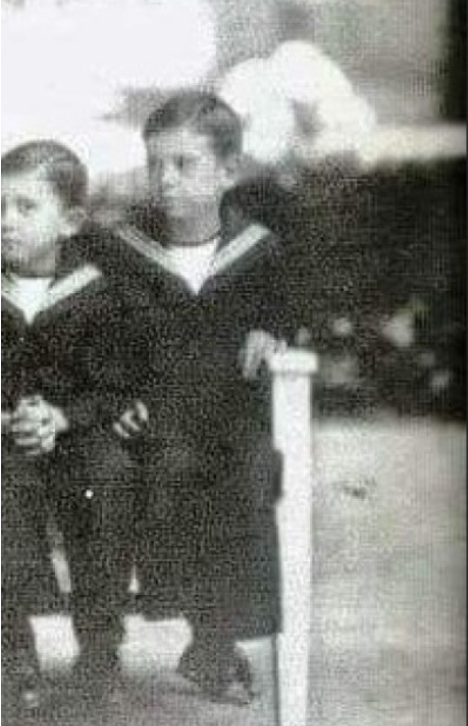
- Díaz (right) in the c. 1910s

Personal information
- Full name: José de la Cruz Porfirio Genaro Díaz Raigosa
- Born: April 29, 1907 Mexico City, Mexico
- Died: 1988 (aged 80–81)

Sport
- Sport: Bobsleigh

José de la Cruz Porfirio Genaro Díaz Raigosa (Note: In this Spanish name, the first or paternal surname is Díaz and the second or maternal family name is Raigosa.) (29 April 1907 – 1988) was a Mexican bobsledder. His brother was fellow bobsledder Genaro Díaz and was the grandson of president Porfirio Díaz. He was selected to be part of the first Mexican team at the Olympics, where the Mexican bobsleigh team competed in the five-man event at the 1928 Summer Olympics and placed eleventh overall.

== Biography ==
José de la Cruz Porfirio Genaro Díaz Raigosa was born on 29 April 1907 in Mexico City, Mexico. His brother is fellow bobsledder, Genaro Díaz. Both of them were grandsons of Porfirio Díaz, the former dictator and President of Mexico who governed the country from 1884 to 1911.

As an athlete, Díaz was selected to compete in the bobsleigh for Mexico at the 1928 Winter Olympics in St. Moritz, Switzerland, for their first appearance at a Winter Games. Together with his brother, Mario Casasús, Lorenzo Elizaga, and Juan de Landa, they composted the Mexican men's bobsleigh team. They competed in the men's five-man event at the Olympia Bobrun on 18 February 1928 across two runs against 22 other teams. In the first run of the event, they recorded a time of 1:44.9 and placed 16th overall. In the next run, they recorded a time of 1:42.8 and placed higher, placing eighth overall. With a combined total of 3:27.7, they placed eleventh overall out of the 22 participants that finished the races. Not much is known about his life after his participation at the 1928 Summer Games besides the fact that he died on 1988 at an age between 80 and 81.
