= Mexico at the 2026 Winter Olympics =

- Flag of Mexico
- IOC code: MEX
- NOC: Mexican Olympic Committee
- Website: www.soycom.org (in Spanish)

in Milan and Cortina d'Ampezzo, Italy 6 February 2026 – 22 February 2026
- Competitors: 5 (3 men and 2 women) in 3 sports
- Flag bearers (opening): Donovan Carrillo & Sarah Schleper
- Flag bearers (closing): Donovan Carrillo & Sarah Schleper
- Medals: Gold 0 Silver 0 Bronze 0 Total 0

Winter Olympics appearances (overview)
- 1928; 1932–1980; 1984; 1988; 1992; 1994; 1998; 2002; 2006; 2010; 2014; 2018; 2022; 2026

Mexico competed at the 2026 Winter Olympics in Milan and Cortina d'Ampezzo, Italy, from 6 to 22 February 2026.

The Mexican delegation consisted of five athletes competing in three sports. Figure skater Donovan Carrillo and alpine skier Sarah Schleper were the country's flagbearers for both the opening ceremony and the closing ceremony.

Sarah Schleper participated in her 7th Winter Olympics (3rd under the Mexican flag). She was joined by her son, Lasse Gaxiola, becoming the first mother-son duo in Winter Olympic history to participate in the same year.

== Competitors ==
The following is the number of competitors who participated at the Games per sport/discipline.

Sport	Men	Women	Total
Alpine skiing	1	1	2
Cross-country skiing	1	1	2
Figure skating	1	0	1
Total	3	2	5

== Alpine skiing ==
Mexico qualified one male and one female alpine skier through the basic quota.

Athlete	Event	Run 1		Run 2		Total	
Athlete	Event	Time	Rank	Time	Rank	Time	Rank
Lasse Gaxiola	Men's slalom	DNF					
Lasse Gaxiola	Men's giant slalom	1:23.56	56	1:20.85	52	2:48.08	53
Sarah Schleper	Women's giant slalom	DSQ					
Sarah Schleper	Women's super-G	—N/a				1:31.37	26

== Cross-country skiing ==
Mexico qualified one male and one female cross-country skier through the basic quota.

Distance

Athlete	Event	Final		
Athlete	Event	Time	Deficit	Rank
Allan Corona	Men's 10 kilometre freestyle	28:33.9	+7:57.7	105
Regina Martínez	Women's 10 kilometre freestyle	34:05.4	+11:16.2	108

== Figure skating ==
Donovan Carrillo secured the country's quota after finishing third at the ISU Skate to Milano qualifier held on 18–21 September 2025 at the National Indoor Stadium in Beijing, China. He represented the country at the Winter Olympics for the second time in his career, emulating what Ricardo Olavarrieta did at the 1988 Winter Olympics and the 1992 Winter Olympics.

Athlete	Event	SP		FP		Total	
Athlete	Event	Points	Rank	Points	Rank	Points	Rank
Donovan Carrillo	Men's singles	75.56	23 Q	143.50	19	219.06	22

== See also ==
- Mexico at the 2026 Winter Paralympics
