= Sarah Schleper =

American-born Mexican alpine skier (born 1979)

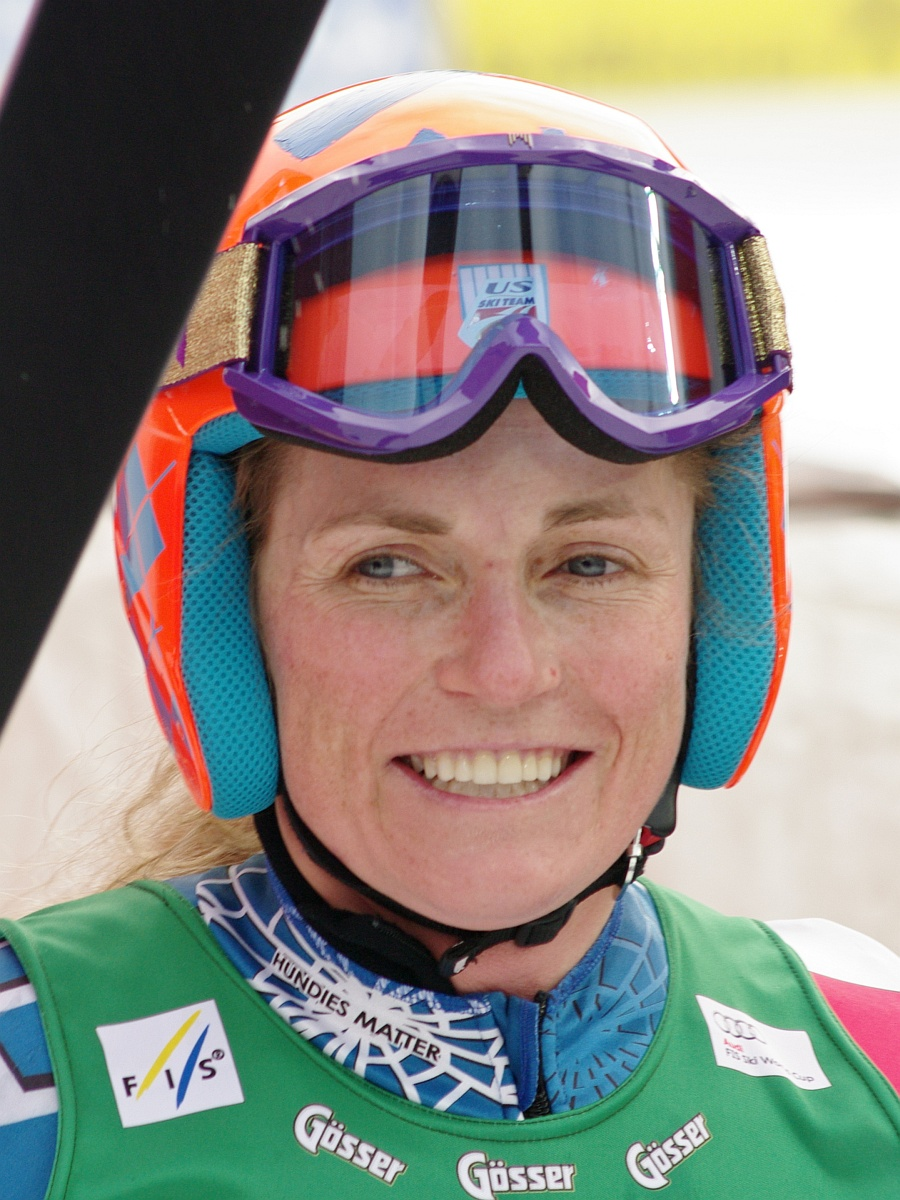
- American alpine skier Sarah Schleper after the first run of the giant slalom in Semmering (Austria) on 28 December 2010.

Personal information
- Full name: Sarah Schleper de Gaxiola
- Born: February 19, 1979 (age 47) Glenwood Springs, Colorado, U.S.
- Spouse: Federico Gaxiola

Skiing career
- Country: United States; Mexico
- Sport: Alpine skiing
- Club: Ski and Snowboard Club Vail
- Disciplines: Slalom, giant slalom, super-G
- World Cup debut: 18 November 1996 (age 17)

Olympics
- Teams: 7 – (1998–2010, 2018–2026)
- Medals: 0

World Championships
- Teams: 11 – (2001–2005, 2009–2011, 2015–2025)
- Medals: 0

World Cup
- Seasons: 19 – (1996–2006, 2009–2012, 2015–2016, 2018, 2022)
- Wins: 1 – (1 SL)
- Podiums: 4 – (3 SL, 1 GS)
- Overall titles: 0 – (17th in 2004 and 2005)
- Discipline titles: 0 – (5th in SL, 2005)

Sarah Schleper (born February 19, 1979), also known as Sarah Schleper de Gaxiola, is an alpine skier whose career started in 1995. She competed for the United States in four Winter Olympics from 1998 to 2010, and later competed for Mexico at the Winter Olympics in 2018, 2022 and 2026.

== Career ==
Her lone World Cup victory was at a slalom event in Switzerland in 2005. Her best finish at the FIS Alpine World Ski Championships was seventh in the slalom event at Santa Caterina (near Bormio) in 2005.

Schleper also competed in four Winter Olympics for USA, earning her best finish of tenth in the slalom event at Turin in 2006. Schleper was named to the US team for the 2010 Winter Olympics in late 2009. Schleper announced her retirement shortly before competing in her last world cup slalom on December 29, 2011, in Lienz, Austria. In her career spanning a total of 15 years, she took part in 186 World Cup races and achieved four podium finishes and one victory.

In keeping with the tradition that allows retiring skiers to wear whatever they choose, Schleper raced in a thin brown summer dress, bare-armed and bare-legged. Midway down the course, she stopped to scoop up her toddler son and carried him in her arms the rest of the way down, delighting the crowd and her fellow competitors. At the finish, Lindsey Vonn greeted her with a long hug, and race organizers presented her with a huge bouquet of roses. At the same race, Mikaela Shiffrin reached the podium for her first time, causing Schleper to believe she would soon be surpassed as the top American ski racer.

After acquiring Mexican citizenship in April 2014, she came out of retirement in June to represent Mexico. She raced for Mexico in the women's giant slalom at the FIS Alpine World Ski Championships 2015. When she joined the Mexican ski team, she doubled the size of the team, serving alongside Prince Hubertus of Hohenlohe-Langenburg, a long time sole representative for Mexico at the world circuit.

Schleper competed for Mexico at the 2018 and 2022 Winter Olympics. Her Olympic effort is self-funded. She represents one of two athletes for Alpine Mexico, the other being Rodolfo Dickson. She qualified for the 2018 Olympics, alongside Rodolfo Dickson, freestyler Roberto Franco, and cross-country skier Germán Madrazo.

Schleper qualified for the 2026 Winter Olympics, her third with Mexico and seventh overall, and was selected as one of the team's flag bearers during the opening ceremony. Her son, Lasse Gaxiola, also qualified in men's alpine skiing, making them the first mother-son duo in Winter Olympics history to compete in the same year.

== Personal life ==
Sarah's father is Buzz Schleper, who owns a ski shop in Vail, Colorado. She is married to Federico Gaxiola and acquired Mexican citizenship via her spouse in April 2014. As of 2014, she lived in both Vail and Mexico.

== World Cup results ==
=== Season standings ===
Season
Season	Age	Overall	Slalom	Giant slalom	Super-G	Downhill	Combined
1998	19	102	—	46	—	—	—
1999	20	90	51	43	—	—	—
2000	21	50	21	25	—	—	—
2001	22	23	11	21	—	—	—
2002	23	22	10	20	—	—	—
2003	24	22	12	21	—	—	—
2004	25	17	11	12	—	—	—
2005	26	17	5	20	—	—	—
2006	27	65	27	36	—	—	—
2007	28	did not compete: birth her child					
2008	29	did not compete: birth her child					
2009	30	97	55	41	—	—	—
2010	31	54	26	20	—	—	—
2011	32	53	30	22	—	—	—
2012	33	107	—	48	—	—	—

=== Race podiums ===
- 1 win – (1 SL)
- 4 podiums – (3 SL, 1 GS)

Season
Season	Date	Location	Discipline	Place
2001	December 10, 2000	Sestriere, Italy	Slalom	2nd
2001	December 30, 2000	Semmering, Austria	Giant slalom	3rd
2004	March 13, 2004	Sestriere, Italy	Slalom	2nd
2005	March 12, 2005	Lenzerheide, Switzerland	Slalom	1st

== World Championship results ==
Year
Year	Age	Slalom	Giant slalom	Super-G	Downhill	Combined
Representing the United States
2001	22	DNF1	DNF1	—	—	—
2003	24	DNF1	DNF1	—	—	—
2005	26	7	13	—	—	—
2009	30	28	31	—	—	—
2011	32	DNF2	50	—	—	—
Representing Mexico
2015	36	DNF1	50	—	—	—
2017	38	DNF1	41	37	38	27
2019	40	—	42	29	—	—
2021	42	—	41	—	—	—
2023	44	—	DSQ1	—	—	—
2025	46	—	37	—	—	—N/a

== Olympic results ==
Year
Year	Age	Slalom	Giant slalom	Super-G	Downhill	Combined
Representing United States
1998	19	22	DNF2	—	—	—
2002	23	DNF1	21	—	—	—
2006	27	10	DNF2	—	—	—
2010	31	16	14	—	—	—
Representing Mexico
2018	39	—	DNF2	41	—	—
2022	43	—	37	35	—	—
2026	47	—	DSQ1	26	—	—N/a

Olympic Games
Preceded by Gabriela López and Rommel Pacheco	Flagbearer for Mexico (with Donovan Carrillo); Beijing 2022	Succeeded by Emiliano Hernández and Alejandra Orozco

Olympic Games
Preceded by Emiliano Hernández and Alejandra Orozco	Flagbearer for Mexico (with Sarah Schleper); Milano Cortina 2026	Succeeded by
