= Mexico at the 1994 Winter Olympics =

- IOC code: MEX
- NOC: Mexican Olympic Committee
- Website: www.soycom.org (in Spanish)

in Lillehammer
- Competitors: 1 in 1 sport
- Flag bearer: Hubertus von Hohenlohe
- Medals: Gold 0 Silver 0 Bronze 0 Total 0

Winter Olympics appearances (overview)
- 1928; 1932–1980; 1984; 1988; 1992; 1994; 1998; 2002; 2006; 2010; 2014; 2018; 2022; 2026

Mexico sent a delegation to compete at the 1994 Winter Olympics in Lillehammer, Norway from 12–27 February 1994. This was the fifth time Mexico had competed in the Winter Olympic Games. The Mexican delegation consisted of one alpine skier, Hubertus von Hohenlohe. He was entered into one event, the men's downhill, in which he finished in 48th place.

== Background ==
The Mexican Olympic Committee was recognized by the International Olympic Committee on 1 January 1923. They had previously competed at the 1900 Summer Olympics in Paris, and made their Winter Olympics debut at the 1928 Winter Olympics. The Mexican team would not return to the Winter Olympics until the 1984 Winter Olympics in Sarajevo, and Lillehammer was Mexico's fifth appearance at a Winter Olympic Games. The 1994 Winter Olympics were held from 12–27 February 1994; a total of 1,737 athletes representing 67 National Olympic Committees took part. The Mexican delegation to Lillehammer consisted of a single alpine skier, Hubertus von Hohenlohe. He was chosen as the flag-bearer for the opening ceremony.

== Competitors ==
The following is the list of number of competitors in the Games.

Sport	Men	Women	Total
Alpine skiing	1	0	1
Total	1	0	1

== Alpine skiing ==
Hubertus von Hohenlohe was 35 years old at the time of the Lillehammer Olympics, and was making the fourth of his six Olympic appearances, having first participated in the Olympics at the 1984 Winter Olympics. He entered one event, the men's downhill, which took place on 13 February. He finished the single-run race in a time of 1 minute and 53.37 seconds, which put him in 48th place out of 50 classified finishers. The gold medal was won by Tommy Moe of the United States in a time of 1 minute and 45.75 seconds, the silver was won by Kjetil André Aamodt of Norway, and the bronze medal was taken by Ed Podivinsky of Canada.

Athlete	Event	Final	
Athlete	Event	Time	Rank
Hubertus von Hohenlohe	Men's downhill	1:53.37	48
