= Mexico at the 2018 Winter Olympics =

- Flag of Mexico
- IOC code: MEX
- NOC: Mexican Olympic Committee
- Website: www.soycom.org (in Spanish)

in Pyeongchang, South Korea February 9–25, 2018
- Competitors: 4 in 3 sports
- Flag bearer: German Madrazo (opening)
- Medals: Gold 0 Silver 0 Bronze 0 Total 0

Winter Olympics appearances (overview)
- 1928; 1932–1980; 1984; 1988; 1992; 1994; 1998; 2002; 2006; 2010; 2014; 2018; 2022; 2026

Mexico competed at the 2018 Winter Olympics in Pyeongchang, South Korea, from 9 to 25 February 2018, with four competitors in three sports.

German Madrazo was the country's flag bearer during the opening ceremony.

== Competitors ==
The following is the list of number of competitors participating in the Mexican delegation per sport.

| Sport | Men | Women | Total |
|---|---|---|---|
| Alpine skiing | 1 | 1 | 2 |
| Cross-country skiing | 1 | 0 | 1 |
| Freestyle skiing | 1 | 0 | 1 |
| Total | 3 | 1 | 4 |

== Alpine skiing ==
Mexico qualified one male and one female athlete for alpine skiing events.

| Athlete | Event | Run 1 | | Run 2 | | Total | |
| Athlete | Event | Time | Rank | Time | Rank | Time | Rank |
|---|---|---|---|---|---|---|---|
| Rodolfo Dickson | Men's giant slalom | 1:17.02 | 55 | 1:16.67 | 47 | 2:33.69 | 48 |
| Rodolfo Dickson | Men's slalom | DNF | | | | | |
| Sarah Schleper | Women's super-G | — | | | | 1:27.93 | 41 |
| Sarah Schleper | Women's giant slalom | 1:16.80 | 39 | DNF | | | |

== Cross-country skiing ==
Mexico qualified one male athlete, signifying the nation's return to the sport for the first time since 1992.

Distance

| Athlete | Event | Final | | |
| Athlete | Event | Time | Deficit | Rank |
|---|---|---|---|---|
| Germán Madrazo | Men's 15 km freestyle | 59:35.4 | +25:51.5 | 116 |

== Freestyle skiing ==
Slopestyle

| Athlete | Event | Qualification | | | | Final | | | | |
| Athlete | Event | Run 1 | Run 2 | Best | Rank | Run 1 | Run 2 | Run 3 | Best | Rank |
|---|---|---|---|---|---|---|---|---|---|---|
| Robert Franco | Men's slopestyle | 21.60 | 36.00 | 36.00 | 27 | did not advance | | | | |
