= Hubertus von Hohenlohe =

Mexican alpine skier

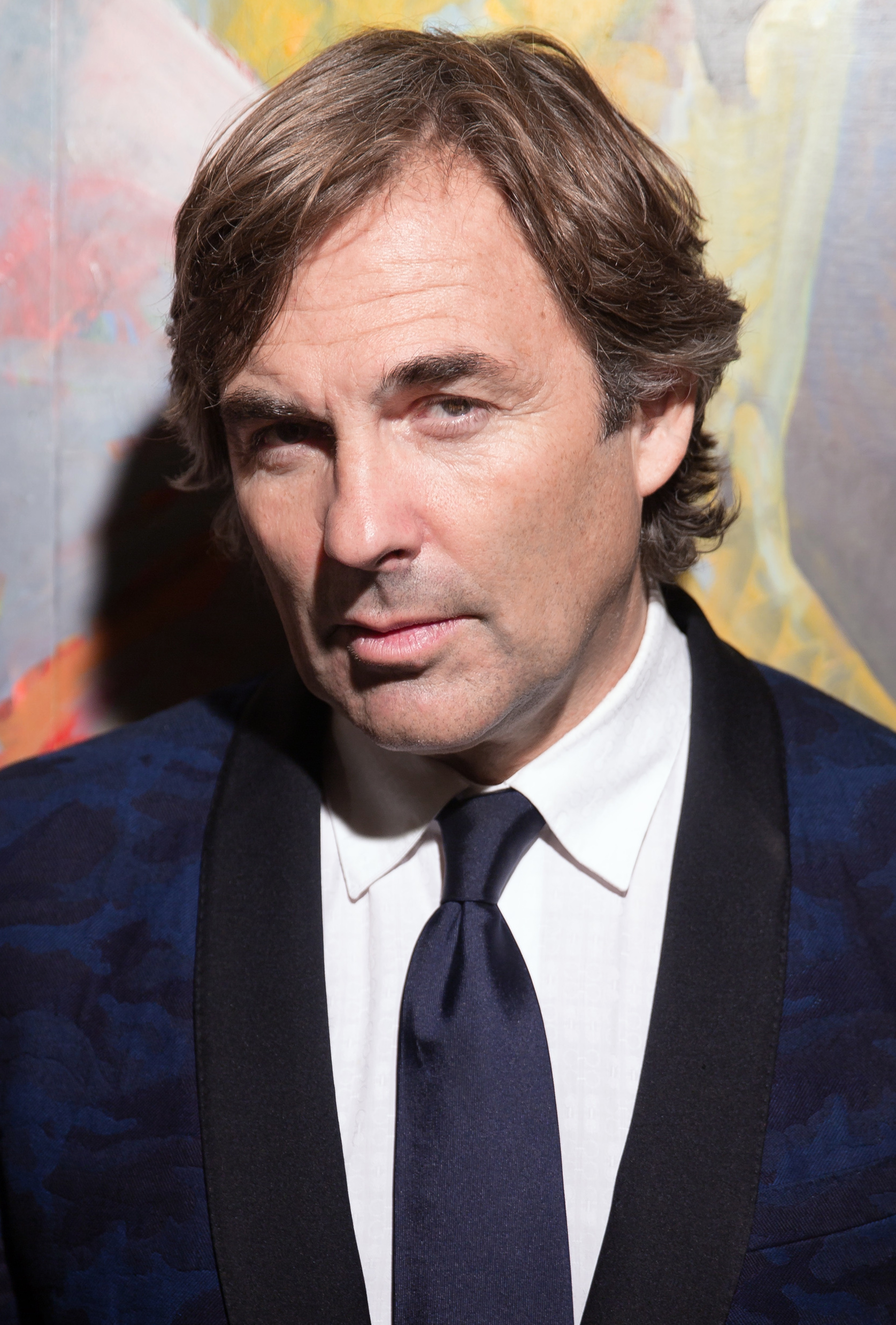
- Pictured in 2015

Personal information
- Born: 2 February 1959 (age 67) Mexico City, Mexico
- Parents: Prince Alfonso of Hohenlohe-Langenburg (father); Ira von Fürstenberg (mother)
- Website: www.hubertushohenlohe.com

Skiing career
- Sport: Alpine skiing
- Disciplines: DH, SG, GS, SL, combined
- World Cup debut: 12 December 1981

Olympics
- Teams: 6 (1984, 1988, 1992, 1994, 2010, 2014)
- Medals: 0

World Championships
- Teams: 21 (1982, 1985, 1987, 1989, 1991, 1993, 1996, 1997, 1999, 2001, 2003, 2005, 2009, 2011, 2013, 2015, 2017, 2019, 2021, 2023, 2025)
- Medals: 0

World Cup
- Seasons: 13
- Podiums: 0

Hubertus Rudolph Prinz zu Hohenlohe-Langenburg (Spanish: [uˈβeɾtus ruˈðolf xoxenˈloxe laŋxemˈbuɾɣ]; born 2 February 1959), commonly known as Hubertus von Hohenlohe, is a Mexican alpine skier, photographer, and businessman. He was previously a pop singer using the names Andy Himalaya and Royal Disaster. He is descended from the former ruling family of the historic principality of Hohenlohe-Langenburg in what is now northeastern Baden-Württemberg, Germany.

== Life and family ==
He is the second son of Prince Alfonso of Hohenlohe-Langenburg and Princess Ira von Fürstenberg. He was born in Mexico City, Mexico, where his father ran a Volkswagen factory. His maternal grandparents were Tassilo, Prince of Fürstenberg (1903–1987) and Clara Agnelli, and his maternal great-grandparents were Karl Emil, Prince of Fürstenberg (1867–1945) and the Hungarian Countess Maria Mathilde Georgina Festetics de Tolna (24 May 1881 – 2 March 1953). His grandmother is half Mexican.

He lived in Mexico for the first four years of his life and then moved to Spain. He later studied in Austria and his main residence was in Vienna, where he worked as a photographer and artist. Although he has Mexican nationality, which makes him eligible to compete for Mexico, he only spends a few weeks per year there. He is fluent in several languages and grew up in Europe, mainly Austria.

He had a brother named Christoph (1956–2006) and has two half-sisters, Arriana Theresa, Princess of Hohenlohe-Langenburg (b. 1975) and Désirée, Countess d'Ursel (b. 1980). Max von Hohenlohe, who competed at the 1956 Winter Olympics, was his uncle, and Prince Marco of Hohenlohe-Langenburg, 19th Duke of Medinaceli, was his first cousin.

He acted as co-producer for Yello and Shirley Bassey's 1987 collaborative single "The Rhythm Divine". He has work on display with the Art of the Olympians. He hosts the travel show Hubertusjagd on Redbull TV.

On 17 June 2019 in Vaduz, he married Simona Gandolfi, cousin of the Italian skier Alberto Tomba. He currently resides in Liechtenstein, of which he is also a citizen.

== Sports career ==
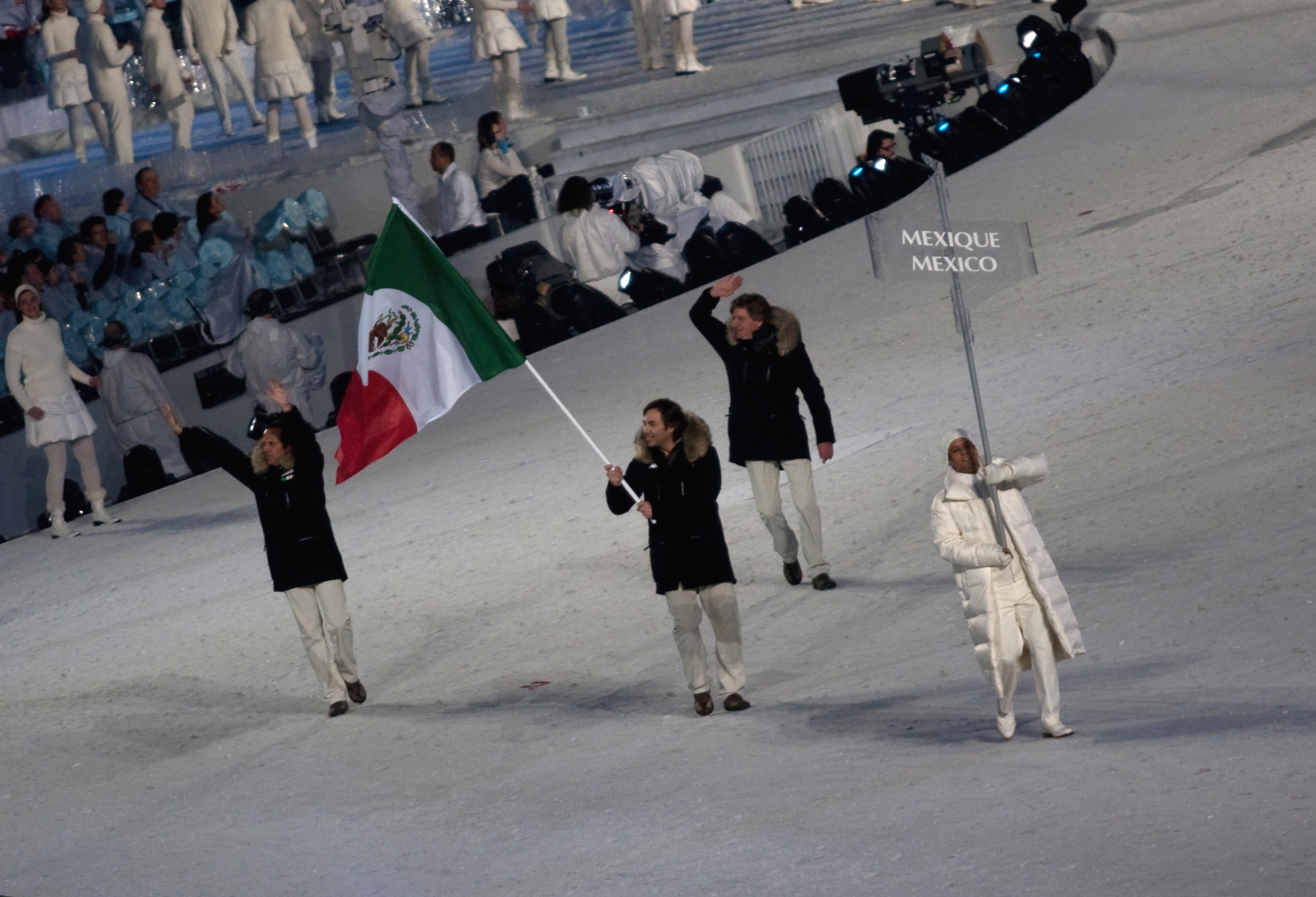
The athletes from Mexico entering the stadium at the opening ceremonies of the 2010 Winter Olympics.

Hohenlohe founded the Mexican Ski Federation in 1981. He first skied for Mexico at a Winter Olympics at the 1984 games in Sarajevo, and he managed to finish 26th in slalom. After the 1984 Winter Olympics, Hohenlohe managed to participate in 1988, 1992, and 1994 Games. He qualified for the 2006 Winter Olympics in Turin, Italy, but the Mexican Olympic Committee decided not to send a one-man team to the Winter Games that year.

Hohenlohe has stated that the only reason why he continues to participate is because it seems that the "exotic skiers" (those from countries without a tradition in winter sports) are disappearing, and that he wants to keep that tradition alive. Since 1982, he has participated in 15 World Championships and set a World Record. Hohenlohe was expected to retire following the 2007 Alpine Skiing World Championships, after breaking his leg during a World Cup slalom race on 28 January 2007, eliminating him from the competition in Åre.

He came back to competition in 2009 and competed in his 12th World Championship, the 2009 Alpine Skiing World Championships.

He was the sole athlete in the Mexican team at the 2010 Winter Olympics. He participated in two alpine skiing disciplines, the Men's Giant Slalom (78th) and the Men's Slalom (46th). At 51, he was the oldest athlete at the games. He also competed at the 2014 Winter Olympics, where he was Mexico's sole athlete again. He participated in slalom but did not finish after a fall during the first run.

In 2015, he was joined by Sarah Schleper on the Mexican ski team, doubling its size, at the FIS Alpine World Ski Championships of that year.

Hohenlohe, affectionately called El Príncipe, mooted retiring for 2017, but instead decided to qualify for the 2018 Winter Olympics. Another two hopes for Alpine Mexico, aside from Hubertus, and Schleper, are Rodolfo Dickson and Jocelyn McGillivray. Additionally, three more hope to represent Mexico, Robby Franco in freestyle skiing, Sandra Hillen in snowboard and Germán Madrazo in Cross-country skiing. He failed to qualify for the 2018 Olympics, but designed the race suits for the Mexican alpine skiers.

== World Championships results ==
Hohenlohe participated at 21 editions of FIS Alpine World Ski Championships, from Schladming 1982 to FIS Alpine World Ski Championships 2025, from the age of 23 up to 66.

Year
Year	Age	Slalom	Giant; Slalom	Super-G	Downhill	Combined
1982	23	26	37		41	47
1985	26	26			40	28
1987	28	34	56	50	46	
1989	30	26	51	63		35
1991	32	46		56	51	
1993	34	42	42		41	
1996	37		42	73	68	42
1997	38	41		62		
1999	40		DNF			
2001	42	55				
2003	44	60	76			
2005	46		60		38	
2009	50	62	DNS2 (QUAL)			
2011	52	69	DNS2 (QUAL)			
2013	54		DSQ1 (QUAL)			
2015	56	46	78 (QUAL)			
2017	58	DSQ	DNF (QUAL)			
2019	60	76 (QUAL)	100 (QUAL)			
2021	62	DNF (QUAL)	DNF1			
2023	64	67 (QUAL)	DNF1			
2025	66	TBD	83 (QUAL)			

== Ancestry ==
Ancestors of Hubertus von Hohenlohe

16. Prince Louis of Hohenlohe-Langenburg
8. Prince Gottfried of Hohenlohe-Langenburg
17. Countess Gabriele of Trauttmansdorff-Weinsberg
4. Prince Max Egon of Hohenlohe-Langenburg
18. Erwin, Count of Schönborn-Buchheim
9. Countess Anna von Schönborn-Buchheim
19. Countess Franziska of Trauttmansdorff-Weinsberg
2. Alfonso, Prince of Hohenlohe-Langenburg
20. Francisco-María de Yturbe y Anciola
10. Manuel de Yturbe y del Villar
21. Cipriana del Villar y Baquero
5. María de la Piedad de Yturbe y von Scholtz-Hersmendorff, Marquesa de Belvís de las Navas
22. Enrique von Scholtz-Hermensdorff y Caravaca, Marquès de Belvís de las Navas
11. María de la Trinidad von Scholtz-Hermensdorff y de Behr, Marquesa de Belvís de las Navas
23. Maria Carlota de Behr y Grund
1. Hubertus, Prince of Hohenlohe-Langenburg
24. Maximilian Egon I, Prince of Fürstenberg
12. Prince Carl Emil of Fürstenberg
25. Countess Leontine of Khevenhüller-Metsch
6. Prince Tassilo of Fürstenberg
26. Tassilo, Prince Festetics von Tolna
13. Countess Maria Festetics von Tolna
27. Lady Mary Victoria Hamilton
3. Ira, Princess von Fürstenberg
28. Giovanni Agnelli
14. Edoardo Agnelli
29. Clara Boselli
7. Clara Agnelli
30. Carlo Bourbon del Monte, Prince of San Faustino
15. Donna Virginia Bourbon del Monte
31. Jane Allen Campbell

== See also ==
- List of royal Olympians

Olympic Games
Preceded by Jesús Mena	Flagbearer for Mexico; Lillehammer 1994	Succeeded by Nancy Contreras
Preceded by Paola Espinosa	Flagbearer for Mexico; Vancouver 2010	Succeeded by María Espinoza
Preceded by María Espinoza	Flagbearer for Mexico; Sochi 2014	Succeeded by Daniela Campuzano
