= Mexico at the 2010 Winter Olympics =

- IOC code: MEX
- NOC: Mexican Olympic Committee
- Website: www.soycom.org (in Spanish)

in Vancouver
- Competitors: 1 in 1 sport
- Flag bearer: Hubertus von Hohenlohe
- Medals: Gold 0 Silver 0 Bronze 0 Total 0

Winter Olympics appearances (overview)
- 1928; 1932–1980; 1984; 1988; 1992; 1994; 1998; 2002; 2006; 2010; 2014; 2018; 2022; 2026

Mexico participated in the 2010 Winter Olympics in Vancouver, British Columbia, Canada, after not having any competitors in the 2006 competition. Mexico first competed in the Winter Olympics in 1928, but then not again until 1984. No Mexican athlete has yet won a medal in the Winter Olympics.

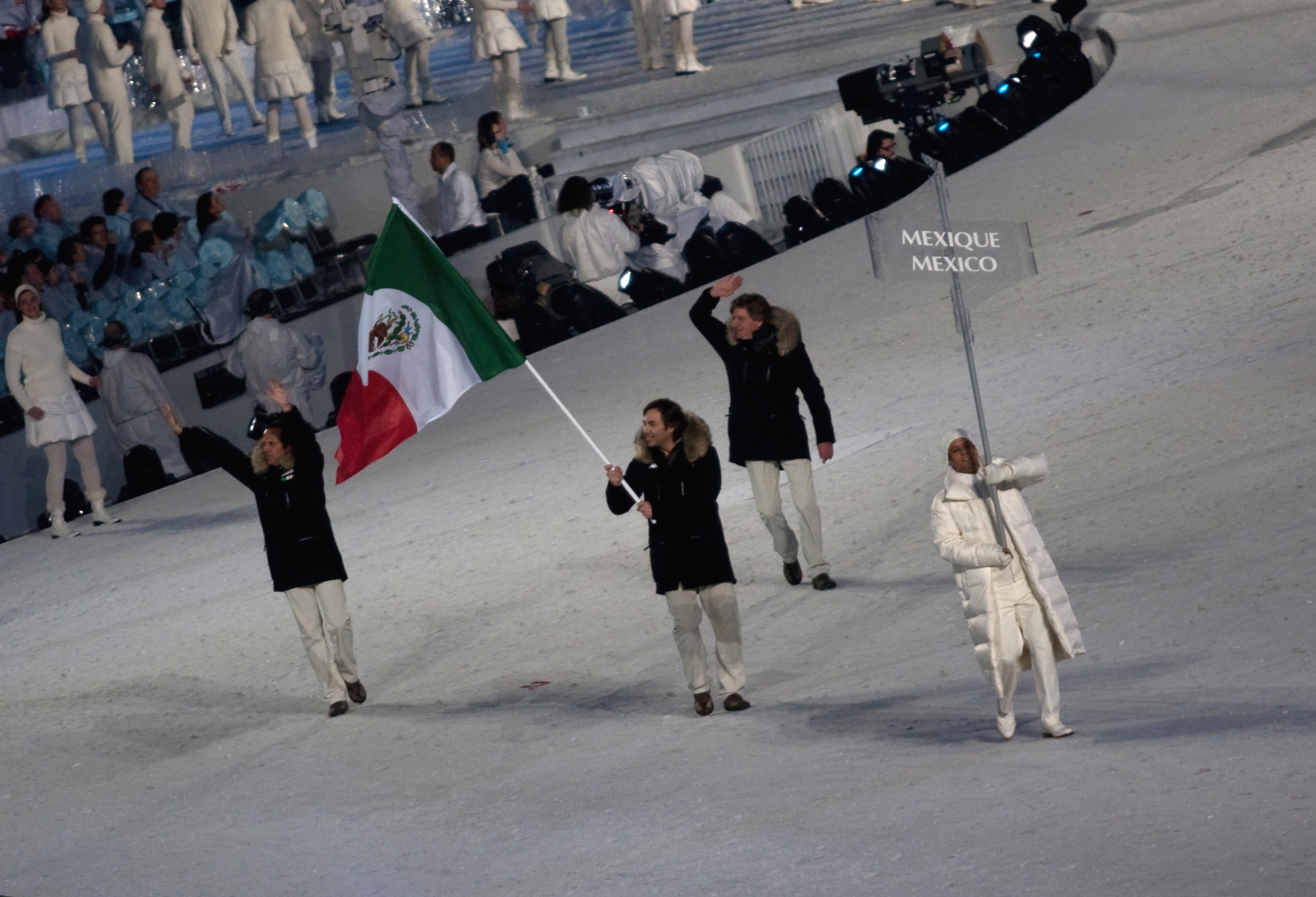
Hubertus von Hohenlohe and two officials entering the stadium during the opening ceremonies.

== Alpine skiing ==
Hubertus von Hohenlohe represented Mexico in the men's slalom. Hohenlohe previously competed in 1984, 1988, 1992 and 1994. A descendant of German and Austrian royalty, and also Mexican nobility on his father's maternal side, he founded Mexico's skiing federation in 1981. He qualified for the 2006 Olympics, but Mexico decided not to participate because no other Mexicans had qualified. He has competed in 12 alpine world championships. Hohenlohe broke his leg in 2007, forcing him to miss a record 13th world championship. At the time of the competition, Hohenlohe was 51 years old.

| Athlete | Event | Run 1 | Run 2 | Total | Rank |
|---|---|---|---|---|---|
| Hubertus von Hohenlohe | Men's slalom | 1:05.69 | 1:02.09 | 2:07.78 | 46 |
| Hubertus von Hohenlohe | Men's giant slalom | 1:34.50 | 1:36.97 | 3:11.47 | 78 |

== See also ==
- Mexico at the 2010 Winter Paralympics
