= Mexico at the 2014 Winter Olympics =

- IOC code: MEX
- NOC: Mexican Olympic Committee
- Website: www.soycom.org (in Spanish)

in Sochi
- Competitors: 1 in 1 sport
- Flag bearers: Hubertus Von Hohenlohe (opening and closing)
- Medals: Gold 0 Silver 0 Bronze 0 Total 0

Winter Olympics appearances (overview)
- 1928; 1932–1980; 1984; 1988; 1992; 1994; 1998; 2002; 2006; 2010; 2014; 2018; 2022; 2026

Mexico competed at the 2014 Winter Olympics in Sochi, Russia from 7 to 23 February 2014. The team once again consisted of Hubertus von Hohenlohe competing in Alpine skiing. Hubertus von Hohenlohe became the second-oldest Winter Olympian ever, and also break the longest span of competing at the winter Olympics (30 years).

== Competitors ==
Sport	Men	Women	Total
Alpine skiing	1	0	1
Total	1	0	1

== Alpine skiing ==
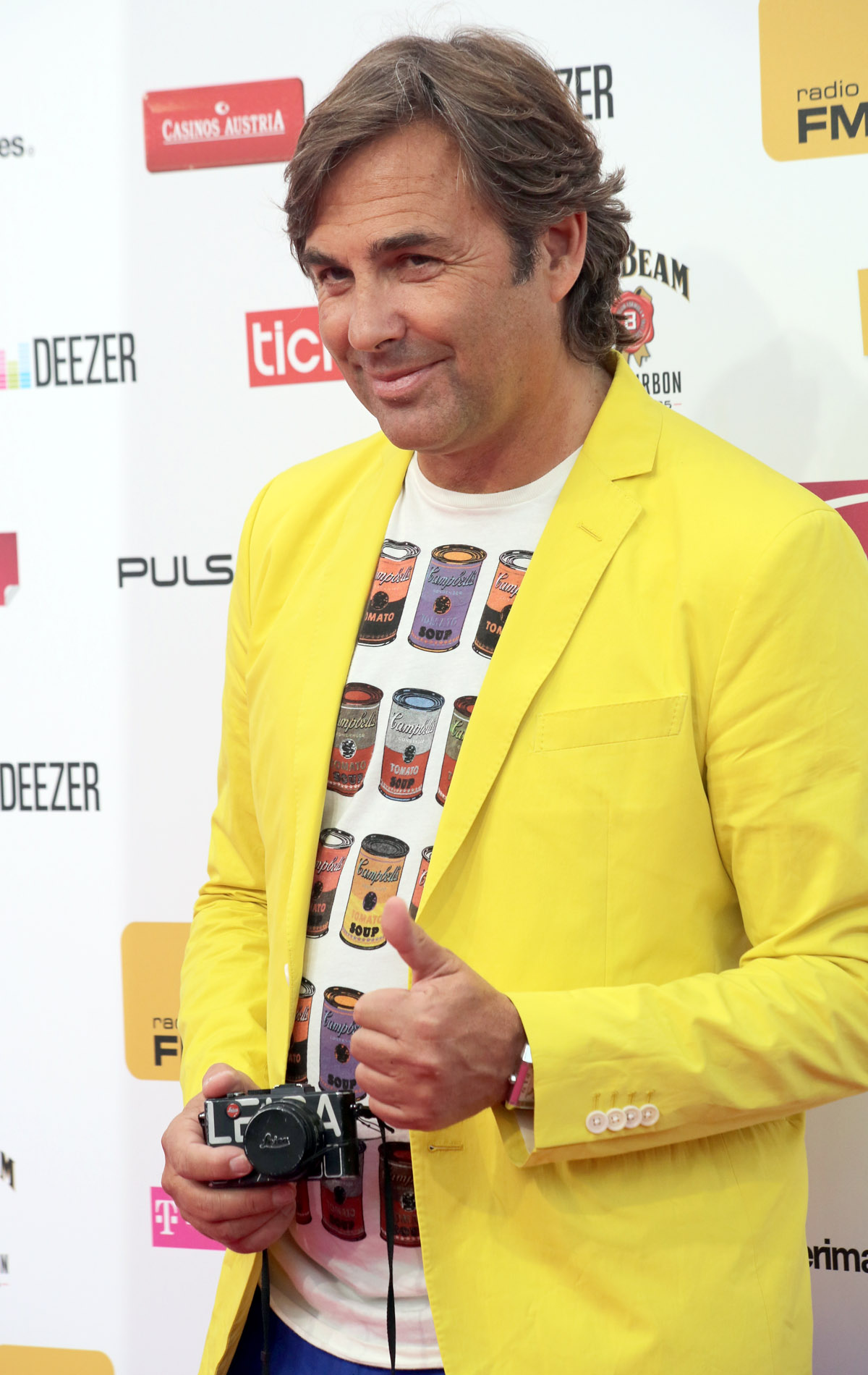
Skier, businessman and pop singer Prince Hubertus of Hohenlohe-Langenburg competed in alpine skiing as the only athlete from Mexico.

According to the final quota allocation released on January 20, 2014, Mexico had one athlete in qualification position. Hubertus von Hohenlohe wore a traditional Mariachi suit while competing. Hubertus von Hohenlohe crashed while competing in his only race (the slalom).

Athlete	Event	Run 1		Run 2		Total	
Athlete	Event	Time	Rank	Time	Rank	Time	Rank
Hubertus von Hohenlohe	Men's slalom	DNF					

== See also ==
- Mexico at the 2014 Summer Youth Olympics
- Mexico at the 2014 Winter Paralympics
