= Allan Corona =

Mexican cross-country skier (born 1990)

Personal information
- Nationality: Mexico
- Born: Allan Daniel Corona; February 16, 1990 (age 36) Mexico City, Mexico

Sport
- Sport: Cross-country skiing

Allan Daniel Corona is a Mexican cross-country skier.

== Biography ==
He grew up in Tijuana and San Diego, skiing recreationally in Southern California in his youth. He attended Otay Ranch High School in Chula Vista and later moved to Norway during the COVID-19 pandemic.

After finishing 37th in the Nordic World Championships in Trondheim, Norway, he qualified to represent Mexico in the 10km freestyle cross-country skiing event at the 2026 Winter Olympics.
