= Mexico at the 2022 Winter Olympics =

- Flag of Mexico
- IOC code: MEX
- NOC: Mexican Olympic Committee
- Website: www.soycom.org (in Spanish)

in Beijing, China February 4–20, 2022
- Competitors: 4 (3 men and 1 woman) in 3 sports
- Flag bearers (opening): Donovan Carrillo; Sarah Schleper
- Flag bearer (closing): Rodolfo Dickson
- Medals: Gold 0 Silver 0 Bronze 0 Total 0

Winter Olympics appearances (overview)
- 1928; 1932–1980; 1984; 1988; 1992; 1994; 1998; 2002; 2006; 2010; 2014; 2018; 2022; 2026

Mexico competed at the 2022 Winter Olympics in Beijing, China, from 4 to 20 February 2022.

Mexico's team consisted of four athletes (three men and one woman) competing in three sports.

Alpine skier Sarah Schleper and figure skater Donovan Carrillo were selected as the Mexican flagbearers during the opening ceremony. Meanwhile alpine skier Rodolfo Dickson was the flagbearer during the closing ceremony.

== Competitors ==
The following is the list of number of competitors participating at the Games per sport/discipline.

Sport	Men	Women	Total
Alpine skiing	1	1	2
Cross-country skiing	1	0	1
Figure skating	1	0	1
Total	3	1	4

== Alpine skiing ==
By meeting the basic qualification standards Mexico qualified one male and one female alpine skier.

Athlete	Event	Run 1		Run 2		Total	
Athlete	Event	Time	Rank	Time	Rank	Time	Rank
Rodolfo Dickson	Men's giant slalom	1:17.32	43	1:17.27	32	2:34.59	35
Sarah Schleper	Women's giant slalom	1:06.42	47	1:05.53	36	2:11.95	37
Sarah Schleper	Women's super-G	—N/a				1:18.17	35

== Cross-country skiing ==
By meeting the basic qualification standards, Mexico has qualified one male cross-country skier.

Distance

Athlete	Event	Final		
Athlete	Event	Time	Deficit	Rank
Jonathan Soto	Men's 15 km classical	53:30.0	+15:35.2	94

== Figure skating ==
In the 2021 World Figure Skating Championships in Stockholm, Sweden, Mexico secured one quota in the men's competition. Donovan Carrillo would go on to finish in 22nd place overall.

Singles

Athlete	Event	SP		FS		Total	
Athlete	Event	Points	Rank	Points	Rank	Points	Rank
Donovan Carrillo	Men's	79.69	19 Q	138.44	22	218.13	22
