= Figure skating at the 2026 Winter Olympics =

Figure skating at the XXV Olympic Winter Games
- Venue: Milano Ice Skating Arena; Milan, Italy
- Dates: 6–19 February 2026
- No. of events: 5
- Competitors: 142 (71 men, 71 women) from 35 nations

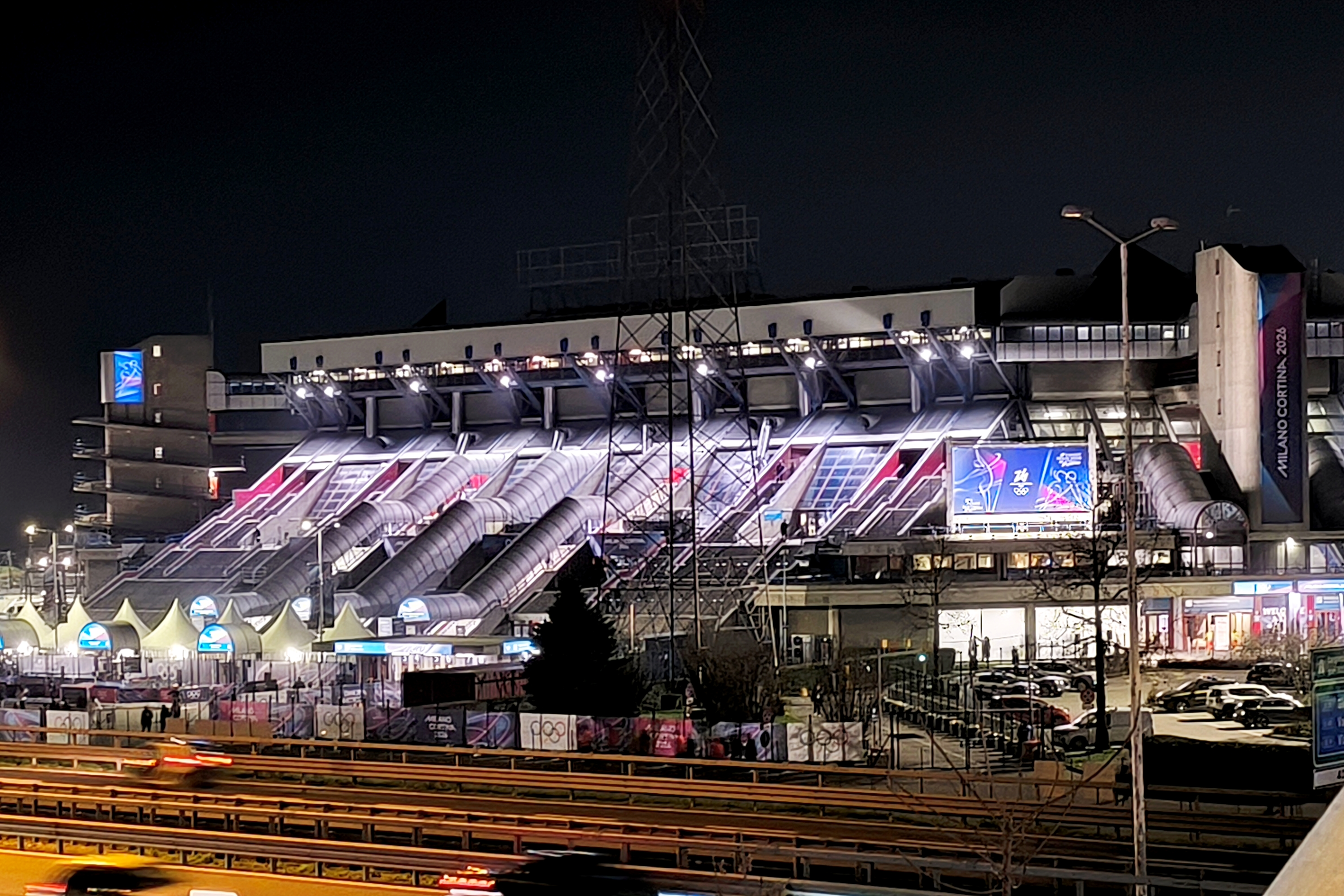
The figure skating events at the 2026 Winter Olympics were held at the Milano Ice Skating Arena in Milan, Italy.

The figure skating events at the 2026 Winter Olympics took place from 6 to 19 February at the Milano Ice Skating Arena in Milan, Italy, and featured 142 skaters from 35 nations. Medals were awarded in men's singles, women's singles, pair skating, ice dance, and the team event. Mikhail Shaidorov of Kazakhstan won the men's event, Alysa Liu of the United States won the women's event, Riku Miura and Ryuichi Kihara of Japan won the pairs event, Laurence Fournier Beaudry and Guillaume Cizeron of France won the ice dance event, and the team from the United States won the team event.

The results of the ice dance event sparked some backlash when Fournier Beaudry and Cizeron won despite obvious errors with the twizzle sequences in both their rhythm dance and free dance. Controversy arose when an examination of the judges' results revealed that the French judge had given Madison Chock and Evan Bates of the United States a total score that was significantly lower than the average score of the remaining eight judges, while, at the same time, awarding Fournier Beaudry and Cizeron a total score that was almost three points above the average score of the remaining judges. A spokesperson from the International Skating Union responded with a statement of confidence in the scoring process, highlighting the safeguards in place to account for rogue scoring.

== Background ==
In October 2023, the International Olympic Committee suspended the Olympic Committee of Russia. The skating federations of Russia and Belarus were each permitted to nominate one skater or team from each discipline to participate at the Skate to Milano as a means to qualify for the 2026 Winter Olympics as Individual Neutral Athletes. Each nominee was required to pass a special screening process to assess whether they had displayed any active support for the 2022 Russian invasion of Ukraine or had any contractual links to the Russian or Belarusian military. Petr Gumennik and Adeliia Petrosian, both of Russia, and Viktoriia Safonova of Belarus earned spots at the Olympics as Individual Neutral Athletes.

A total of five events were contested: men's singles, women's singles, pair skating, ice dance, and the team event. All events were held from 6 to 19 February at the Milano Ice Skating Arena in Milan, Italy.

== Qualification ==
A total of 142 quota spots were available to athletes to compete in figure skating at the 2026 Winter Olympics. Each National Olympic Committee (NOC) was allowed to enter a maximum of 18 skaters, with a maximum of nine men or nine women. The results of the 2025 World Figure Skating Championships determined 83 total spots: 24 entries each in men's and women's singles, 15 in pair skating, and 18 in ice dance. The remaining quota spots were allocated based on the results of the Skate to Milano. Additionally, one men's singles skater and two ice dance teams qualified to compete in the team event, but not the individual events, bringing the total number of competitors to 147.

Number of qualified skaters or teams per nation
Nations	Men's singles	Women's singles	Pairs	Ice dance	Team event	Add.	Skater(s)
Armenia			1				2
Australia			1	1			4
Austria		1					1
Azerbaijan	1						1
Belgium		2					2
Bulgaria		1					1
Canada	1	1	2	3	Yes		12
China	1	1	1	1	Yes		6
Czech Republic				2			4
Estonia	1	1					2
Finland		1		1			3
France	2	1	1	2	Yes		9
Georgia	1	1	1	1	Yes		6
Germany			2	1			6
Great Britain		1	1	2	Yes	1 (Note: Edward Appleby of Great Britain competed in the team event, but not the men's individual event.)	8
Hungary			1				2
Individual Neutral Athletes	1	2					3
Israel		1					1
Italy	2	1	2	1	Yes		9
Japan	3	3	2		Yes	2 (Note: Utana Yoshida and Masaya Morita of Japan competed in the team event, but not the ice dance event.)	10
Kazakhstan	1	1					2
Latvia	2						2
Lithuania		1		1			3
Mexico	1						1
Netherlands			1				2
Poland	1	1	1		Yes	2 (Note: Sofiia Dovhal and Wiktor Kulesza of Poland competed in the team event, but not the ice dance event.)	6
Romania		1					1
Slovakia	1						1
South Korea	2	2		1	Yes		6
Spain	1			2			5
Sweden	1			1			3
Switzerland	1	2					3
Chinese Taipei	1						1
Ukraine	1						1
United States	3	3	2	3	Yes		16
Total: 35 NOCs	29	29	19 teams	23 teams	10 teams	5	147

=== Team event ===
For the team event, scores from the 2025 World Championships and the 2025–26 Grand Prix Series were tabulated to establish the top ten nations.

Qualification for figure skating team event
Pl.	Nation	M	W	P	D	Total
1	United States	Yes	Yes	Yes	Yes	7069
2	Japan	Yes	Yes	Yes	(Note: Although Japan did not qualify an ice dance team for the team event, they were able to use two additional athlete quotas in order to complete their team.)	6027
3	Italy	Yes	Yes	Yes	Yes	4606
4	Canada	Yes	Yes	Yes	Yes	4231
5	Georgia	Yes	Yes	Yes	Yes	4106
6	France	Yes	Yes	Yes	Yes	3829
7	Great Britain	(Note: Although Great Britain did not qualify a men's singles skater for the team event, they were able to use an additional athlete quota in order to complete their team.)	Yes	Yes	Yes	2671
8	South Korea	Yes	Yes	No	Yes	2171
9	China	Yes	Yes	Yes	Yes	2132
10	Poland	Yes	Yes	Yes	(Note: Although Poland did not qualify an ice dance team for the team event, they were able to use two additional athlete quotas in order to complete their team.)	776

== Entries ==
Countries began announcing their selections following the 2025 World Championships. The International Skating Union published a complete list of entries on 26 January 2026. Skaters or teams denoted with ● were eligible for the team event only.

Finland had originally qualified for two quota spots in the ice dance event at the 2025 World Championships; however, when Yuka Orihara was unable to obtain Finnish citizenship, Finland relinquished their second quota spot. As a result, the spot was reallocated to Sweden, and Milla Ruud Reitan and Nikolaj Majorov became the first Swedish ice dance team to qualify for the Winter Olympics.

Additionally, Uzbekistan had originally qualified one quota spot in the pairs event after Ekaterina Geynish and Dmitrii Chigirev finished in tenth place at the 2025 World Championships. However, after Geynish and Chigirev ended their partnership, the spot was re-allocated to France, who chose to send Camille Kovalev and Pavel Kovalev.

Meda Variakojytė of Lithuania made history as the first Lithuanian woman to qualify for the Winter Olympics in single skating. Daria Danilova and Michel Tsiba of the Netherlands became the first Dutch pairs team to qualify for the Winter Olympics.

Entries
Nation	Men	Women	Pairs	Ice dance	Ref.
Armenia	—N/a		Karina Akopova; Nikita Rakhmanin	—N/a	
Australia	—N/a		Anastasiia Golubeva; Hektor Giotopoulos Moore	Holly Harris; Jason Chan	
Austria	—N/a	Olga Mikutina	—N/a		
Azerbaijan	Vladimir Litvintsev	—N/a			
Belgium	—N/a	Loena Hendrickx	—N/a		
Belgium	—N/a	Nina Pinzarrone	—N/a		
Bulgaria	—N/a	Alexandra Feigin	—N/a		
Canada	Stephen Gogolev	Madeline Schizas	Lia Pereira; Trennt Michaud	Piper Gilles; Paul Poirier	
Canada	—N/a		Deanna Stellato-Dudek; Maxime Deschamps	Marjorie Lajoie; Zachary Lagha	
Canada	—N/a			Marie-Jade Lauriault; Romain le Gac	
China	Jin Boyang	Zhang Ruiyang	Sui Wenjing; Han Cong	Wang Shiyue; Liu Xinyu	
Chinese Taipei	Li Yu-Hsiang	—N/a			
Czech Republic	—N/a			Natálie Taschlerová; Filip Taschler	
Czech Republic	—N/a			Kateřina Mrázková; Daniel Mrázek	
Estonia	Aleksandr Selevko	Niina Petrõkina	—N/a		
Finland	—N/a	Iida Karhunen	—N/a	Juulia Turkkila; Matthias Versluis	
France	Kévin Aymoz	Lorine Schild	Camille Kovalev; Pavel Kovalev	Laurence Fournier Beaudry; Guillaume Cizeron	
France	Adam Siao Him Fa	—N/a		Evgeniia Lopareva; Geoffrey Brissaud	
Georgia	Nika Egadze	Anastasiia Gubanova	Anastasiia Metelkina; Luka Berulava	Diana Davis; Gleb Smolkin	
Germany	—N/a		Minerva Fabienne Hase; Nikita Volodin	Jennifer Janse van Rensburg; Benjamin Steffan	
Germany	—N/a		Annika Hocke; Robert Kunkel	—N/a	
Great Britain	Edward Appleby ●	Kristen Spours	Anastasia Vaipan-Law; Luke Digby	Phebe Bekker; James Hernandez	
Great Britain	—N/a			Lilah Fear; Lewis Gibson	
Hungary	—N/a		Maria Pavlova; Alexei Sviatchenko	—N/a	
Individual Neutral Athletes	Petr Gumennik	Adeliia Petrosian	—N/a		
Individual Neutral Athletes	—N/a	Viktoriia Safonova	—N/a		
Israel	—N/a	Mariia Seniuk	—N/a		
Italy	Daniel Grassl	Lara Naki Gutmann	Sara Conti; Niccolò Macii	Charlène Guignard; Marco Fabbri	
Italy	Matteo Rizzo	—N/a	Rebecca Ghilardi; Filippo Ambrosini	—N/a	
Japan	Yuma Kagiyama	Mone Chiba	Riku Miura; Ryuichi Kihara	Utana Yoshida; Masaya Morita; ●	
Japan	Kao Miura	Ami Nakai	Yuna Nagaoka; Sumitada Moriguchi	—N/a	
Japan	Shun Sato	Kaori Sakamoto	—N/a	—N/a	
Kazakhstan	Mikhail Shaidorov	Sofia Samodelkina	—N/a		
Latvia	Fedirs Kuļišs	—N/a			
Latvia	Deniss Vasiļjevs	—N/a			
Lithuania	—N/a	Meda Variakojytė	—N/a	Allison Reed; Saulius Ambrulevičius	
Mexico	Donovan Carrillo	—N/a			
Netherlands	—N/a		Daria Danilova; Michel Tsiba	—N/a	
Poland	Vladimir Samoilov	Ekaterina Kurakova	Ioulia Chtchetinina; Michał Woźniak	Sofiia Dovhal; Wiktor Kulesza; ●	
Romania	—N/a	Julia Sauter	—N/a		
Slovakia	Adam Hagara	—N/a			
South Korea	Cha Jun-hwan	Lee Hae-in	—N/a	Hannah Lim; Ye Quan	
South Korea	Kim Hyun-gyeom	Shin Ji-a	—N/a	—N/a	
Spain	Tomàs-Llorenç Guarino Sabaté	—N/a		Olivia Smart; Tim Dieck	
Spain	—N/a	—N/a		Sofía Val; Asaf Kazimov	
Sweden	Andreas Nordebäck	—N/a		Milla Ruud Reitan; Nikolaj Majorov	
Switzerland	Lukas Britschgi	Livia Kaiser	—N/a		
Switzerland	—N/a	Kimmy Repond	—N/a		
Ukraine	Kyrylo Marsak	—N/a			
United States	Ilia Malinin	Amber Glenn	Emily Chan; Spencer Howe	Christina Carreira; Anthony Ponomarenko	
United States	Maxim Naumov	Isabeau Levito	Ellie Kam; Daniel O'Shea	Madison Chock; Evan Bates	
United States	Andrew Torgashev	Alysa Liu	—N/a	Emilea Zingas; Vadym Kolesnik	

== Competition schedule ==
Figure skating events schedule
Date	Time	Event
6 February	09:55	Team event (rhythm dance)
6 February	11:35	Team event (pairs' short program)
6 February	13:35	Team event (women's short program)
7 February	19:45	Team event (men's short program)
7 February	22:05	Team event (free dance)
8 February	19:30	Team event (pairs' free skating)
8 February	20:45	Team event (women's free skating)
8 February	21:55	Team event (men's free skating)
9 February	19:20	Rhythm dance
10 February	18:30	Men's short program
11 February	19:30	Free dance
13 February	19:00	Men's free skating
15 February	19:45	Pair short program
16 February	20:00	Pair free skating
17 February	18:45	Women's short program
19 February	19:00	Women's free skating
21 February	20:00	Exhibition gala

== Medal summary ==
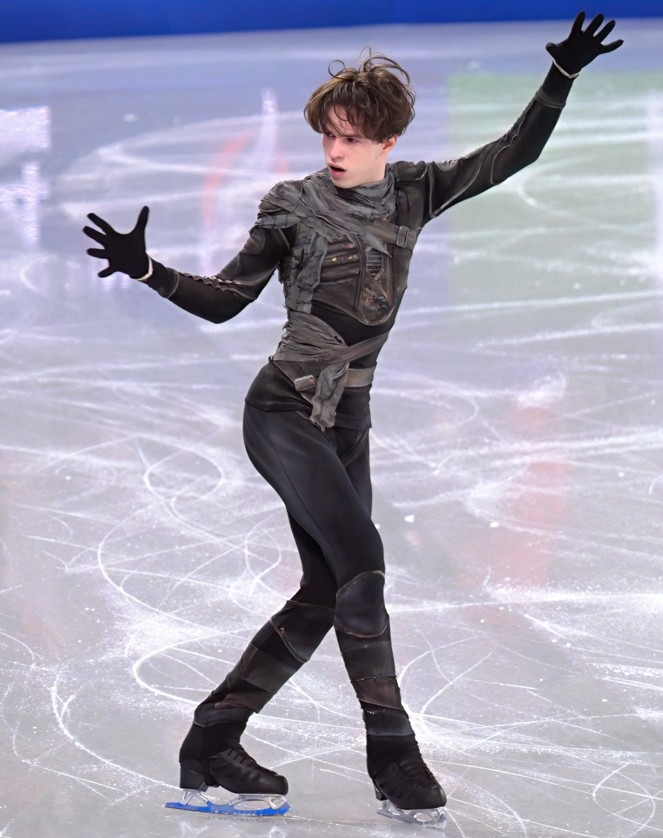
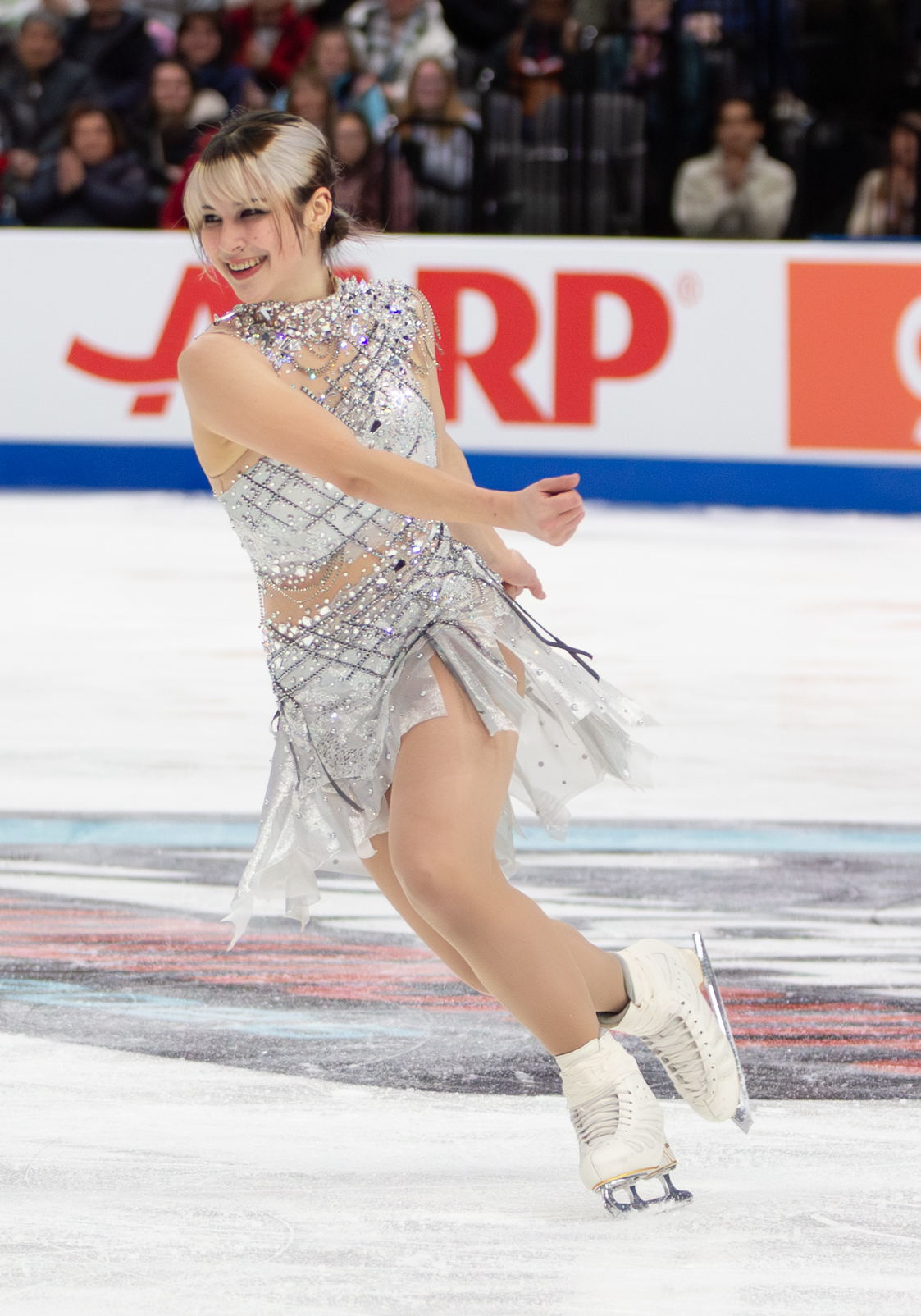
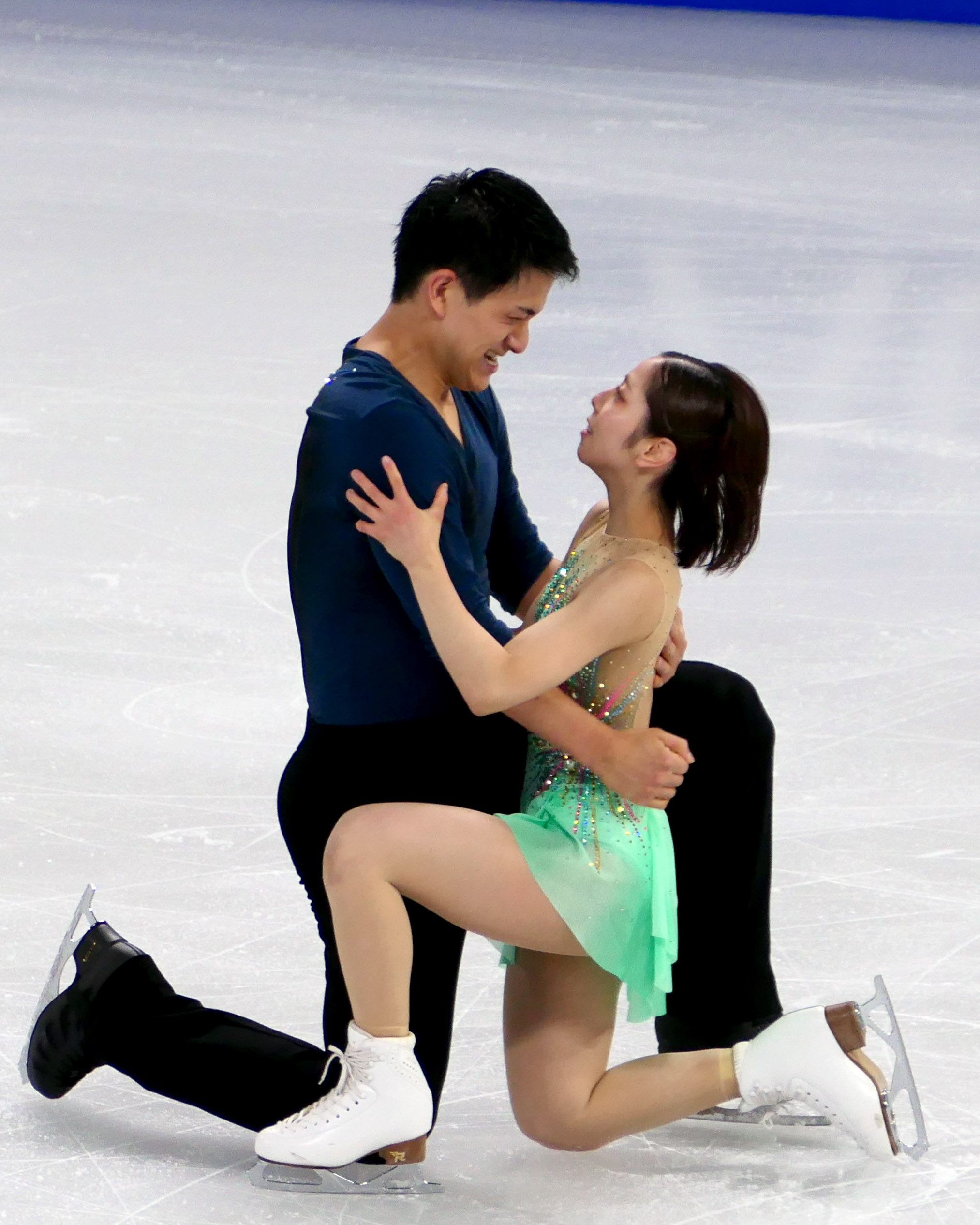
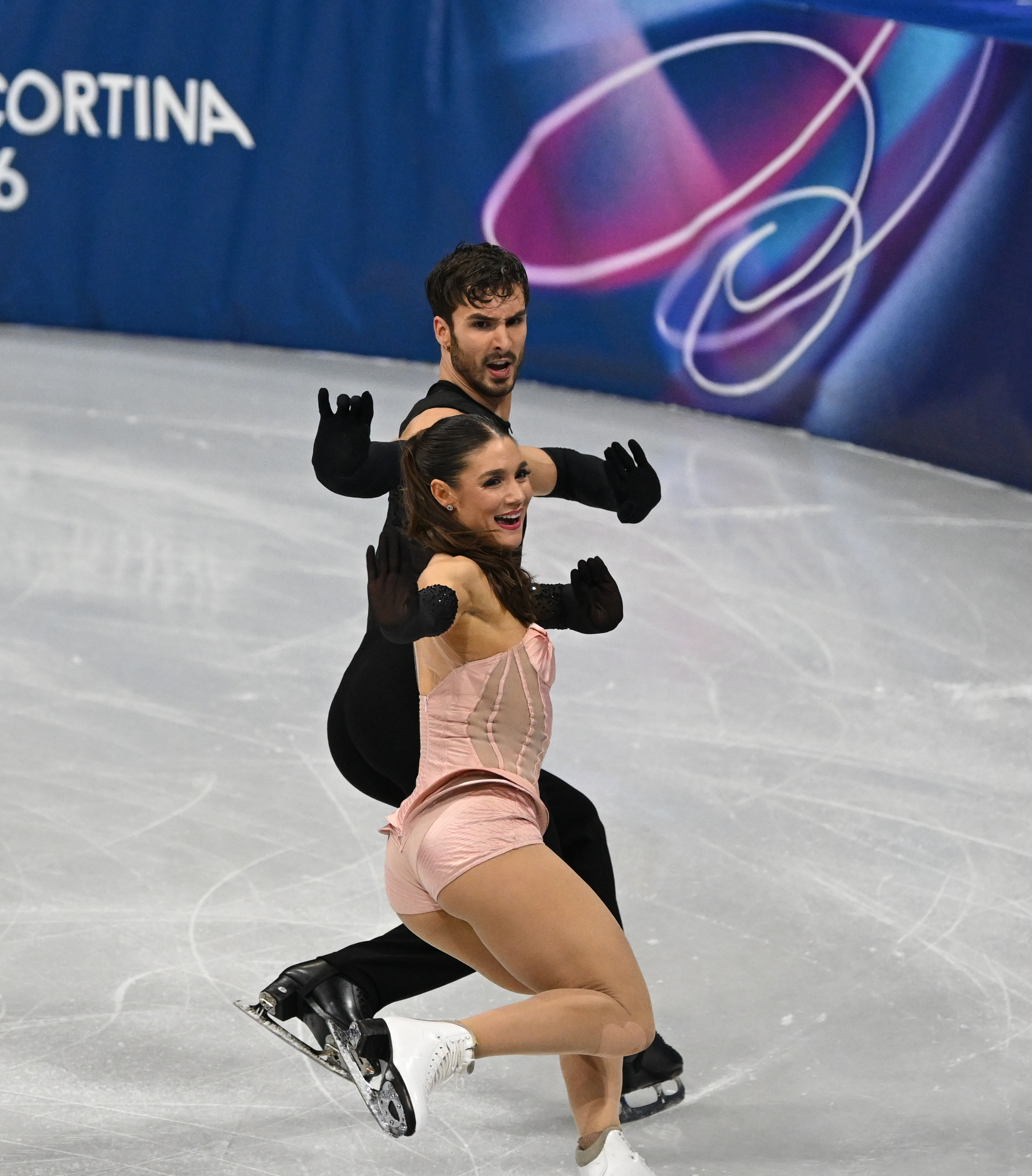
The 2026 Winter Olympic figure skating champions (from left to right):
Mikhail Shaidorov of Kazakhstan (men's singles), Alysa Liu of the United States (women's singles), Riku Miura and Ryuichi Kihara of Japan (pair skating), and Laurence Fournier Beaudry and Guillaume Cizeron of France (ice dance)

=== Medalists ===
Mikhail Shaidorov won the first ever Olympic gold medal in figure skating for Kazakhstan; Shaidorov is only the second Kazakh figure skater to win a medal at the Winter Olympics. Riku Miura and Ryuichi Kihara won the first ever Olympic medal in pair skating for Japan. Anastasiia Metelkina and Luka Berulava won the first Winter Olympic medals in Georgian history.

2026 Winter Olympic medalists
Discipline	Gold	Silver	Bronze	Ref.
Men's singles	Mikhail Shaidorov; Kazakhstan	Yuma Kagiyama; Japan	Shun Sato; Japan	
Women's singles	Alysa Liu; United States	Kaori Sakamoto; Japan	Ami Nakai; Japan	
Pairs	Riku Miura; Ryuichi Kihara; Japan	Anastasiia Metelkina; Luka Berulava; Georgia	Minerva Fabienne Hase; Nikita Volodin; Germany	
Ice dance	Laurence Fournier Beaudry; Guillaume Cizeron; France	Madison Chock; Evan Bates; United States	Piper Gilles; Paul Poirier; Canada	
Team event	United States; Ilia Malinin; Alysa Liu; Amber Glenn; Ellie Kam; Daniel O'Shea; Madison Chock; Evan Bates	Japan; Yuma Kagiyama; Shun Sato; Kaori Sakamoto; Riku Miura; Ryuichi Kihara; Utana Yoshida; Masaya Morita	Italy; Daniel Grassl; Matteo Rizzo; Lara Naki Gutmann; Sara Conti; Niccolò Macii; Charlène Guignard; Marco Fabbri	

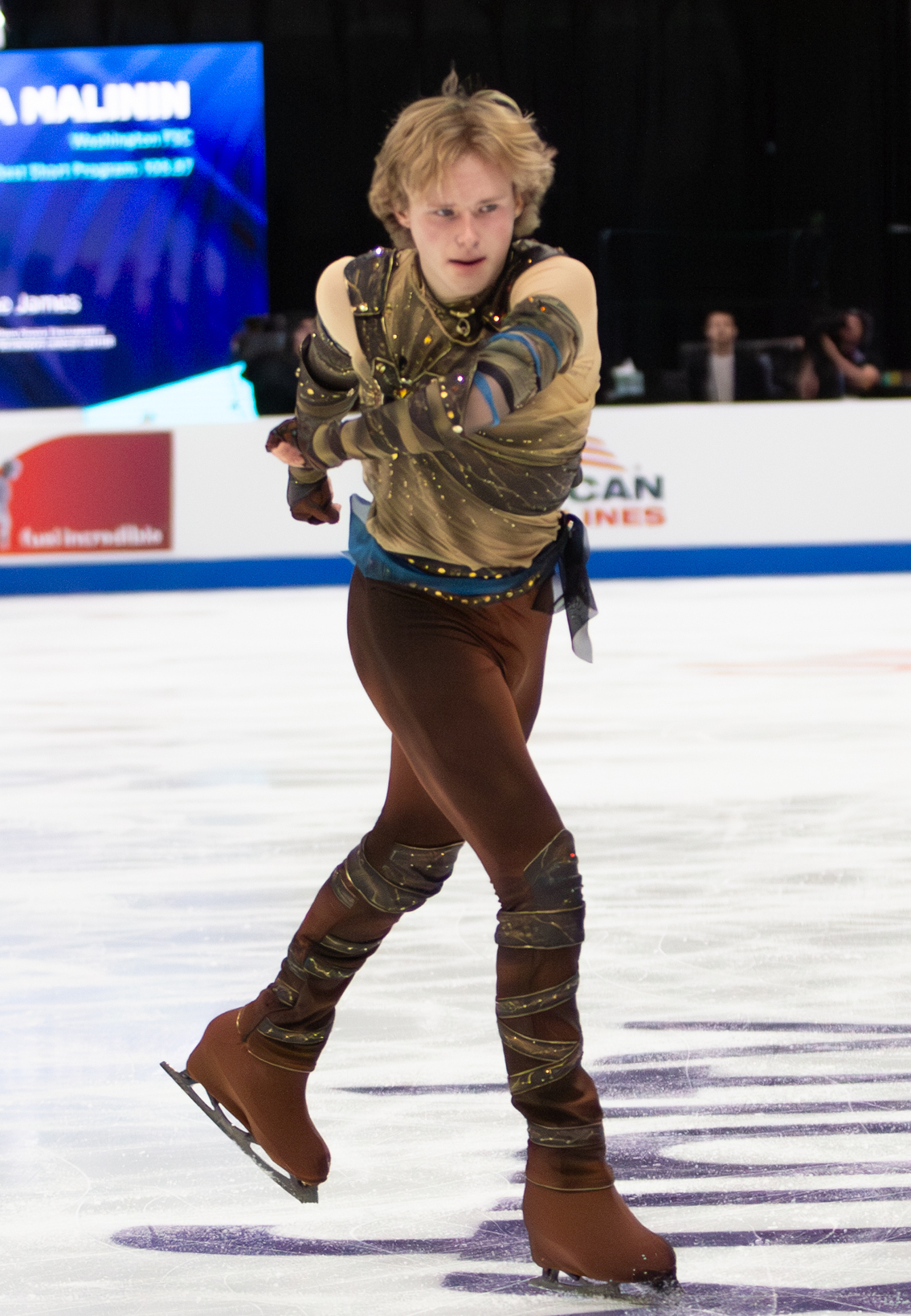
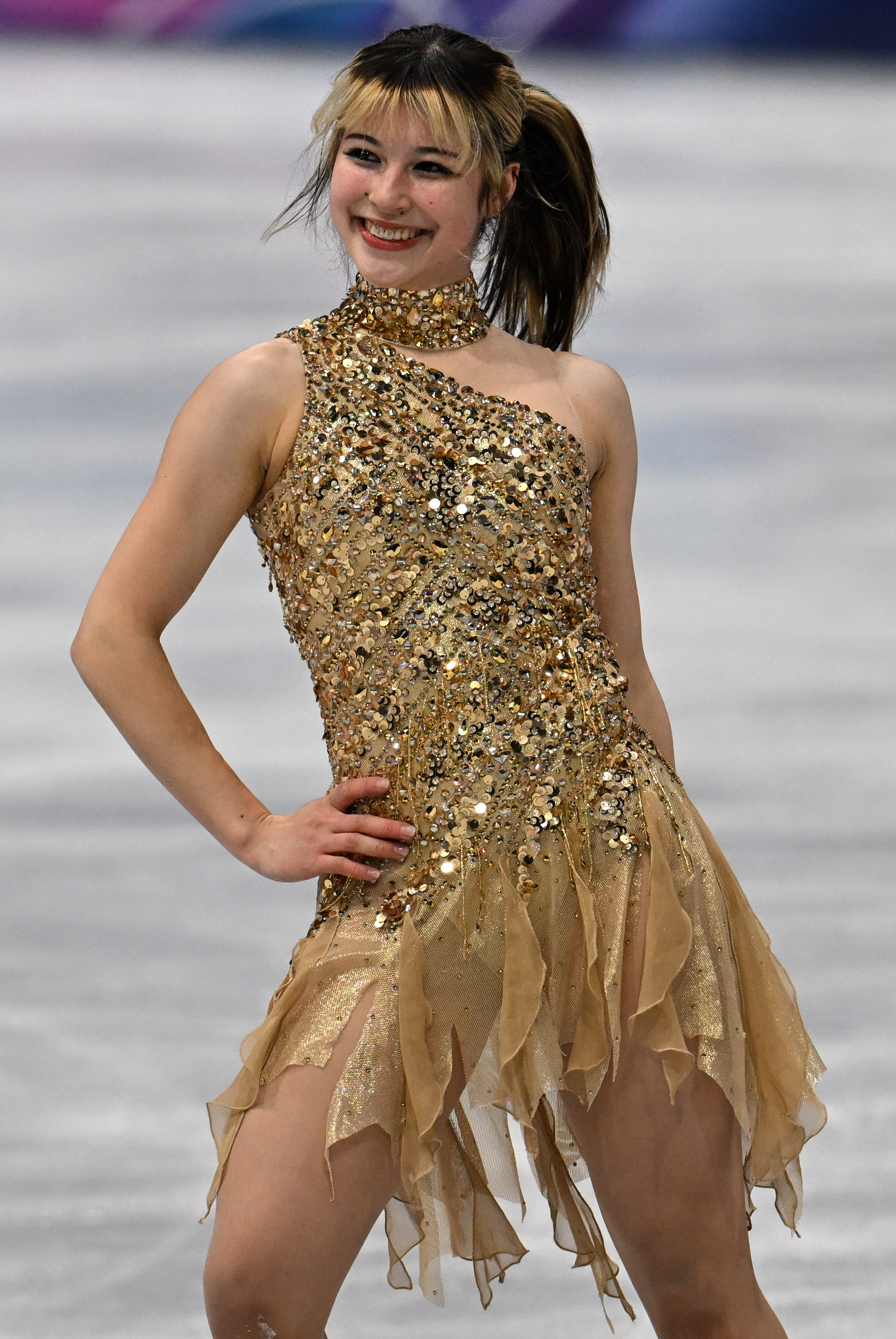
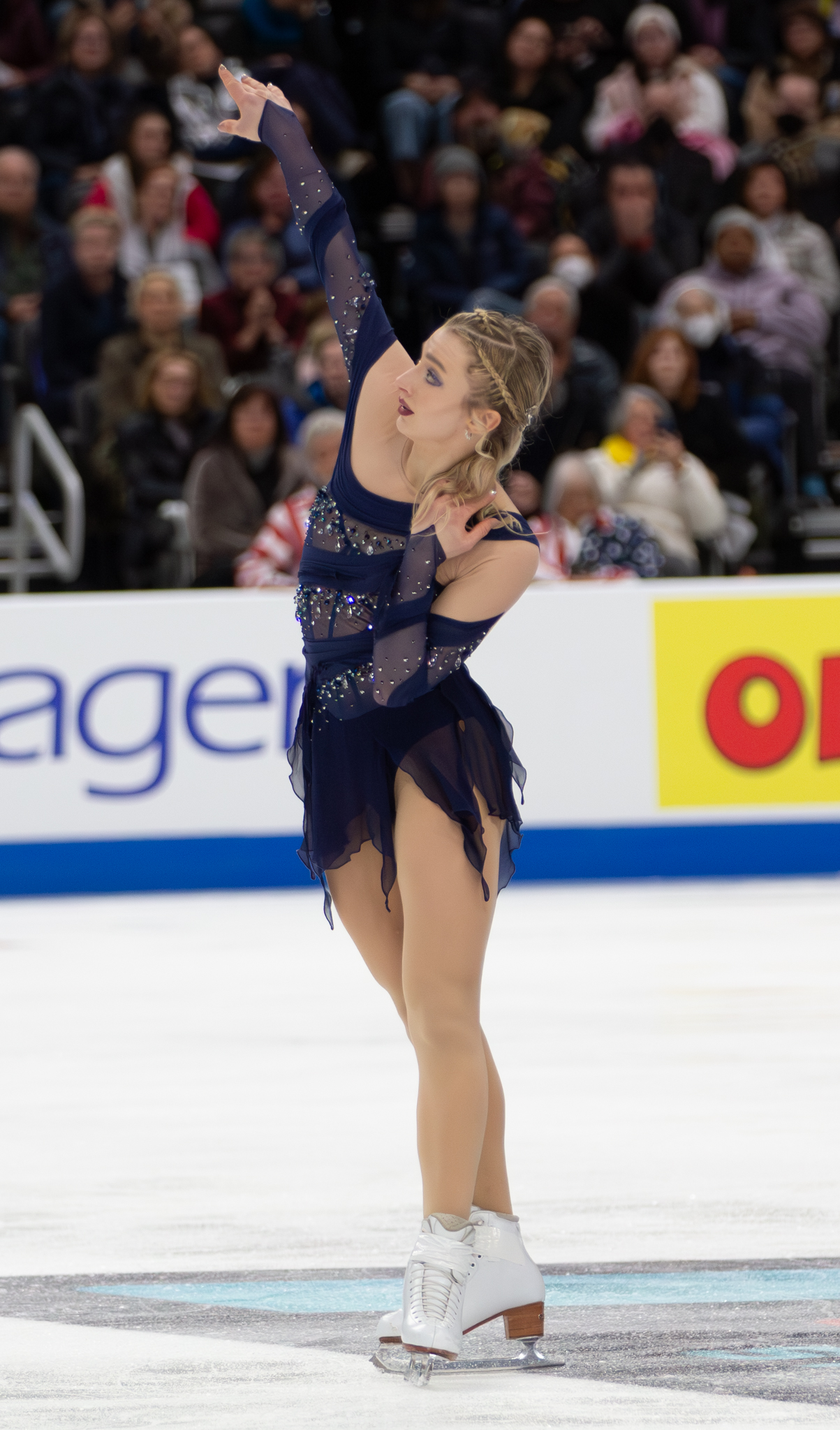
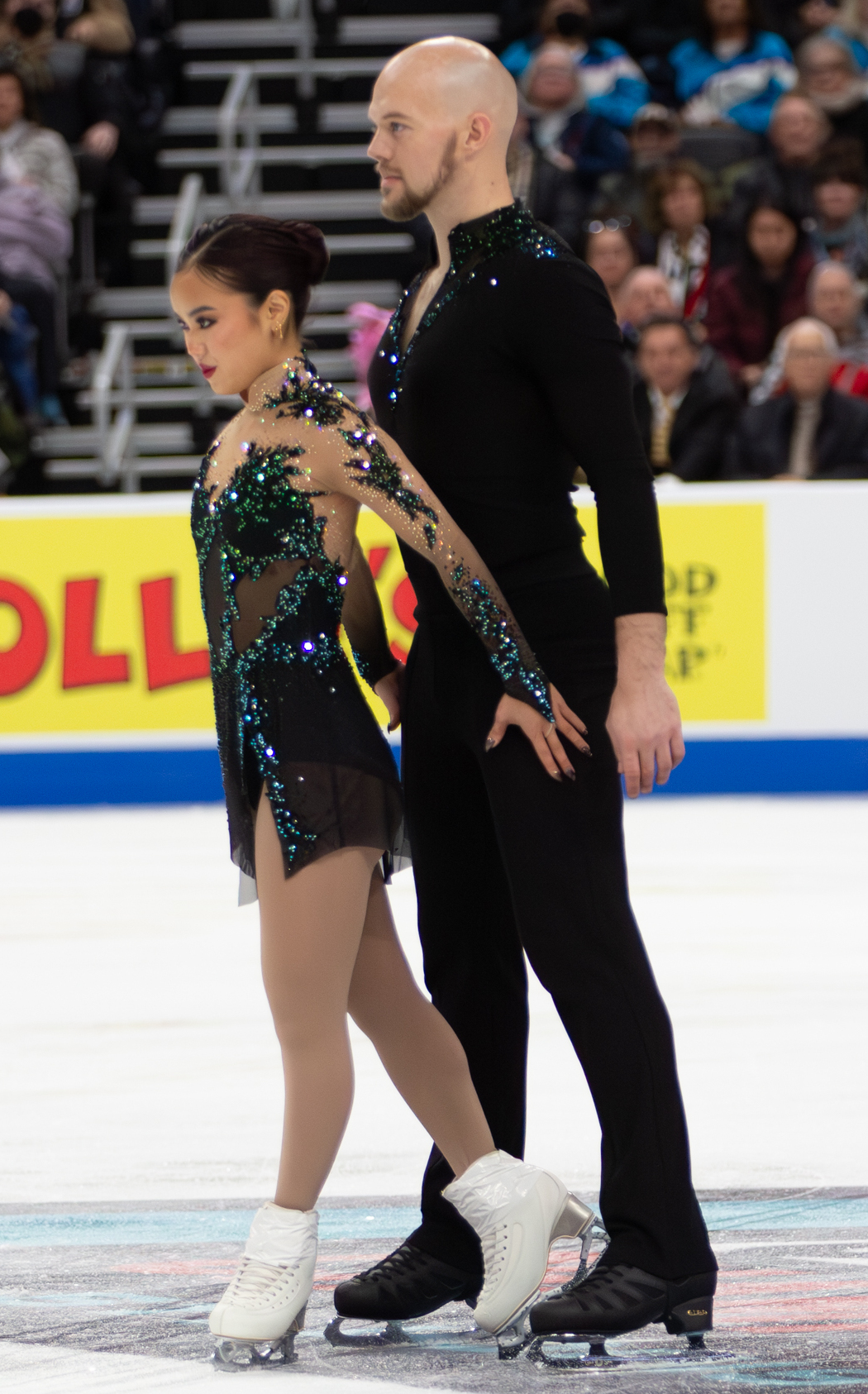
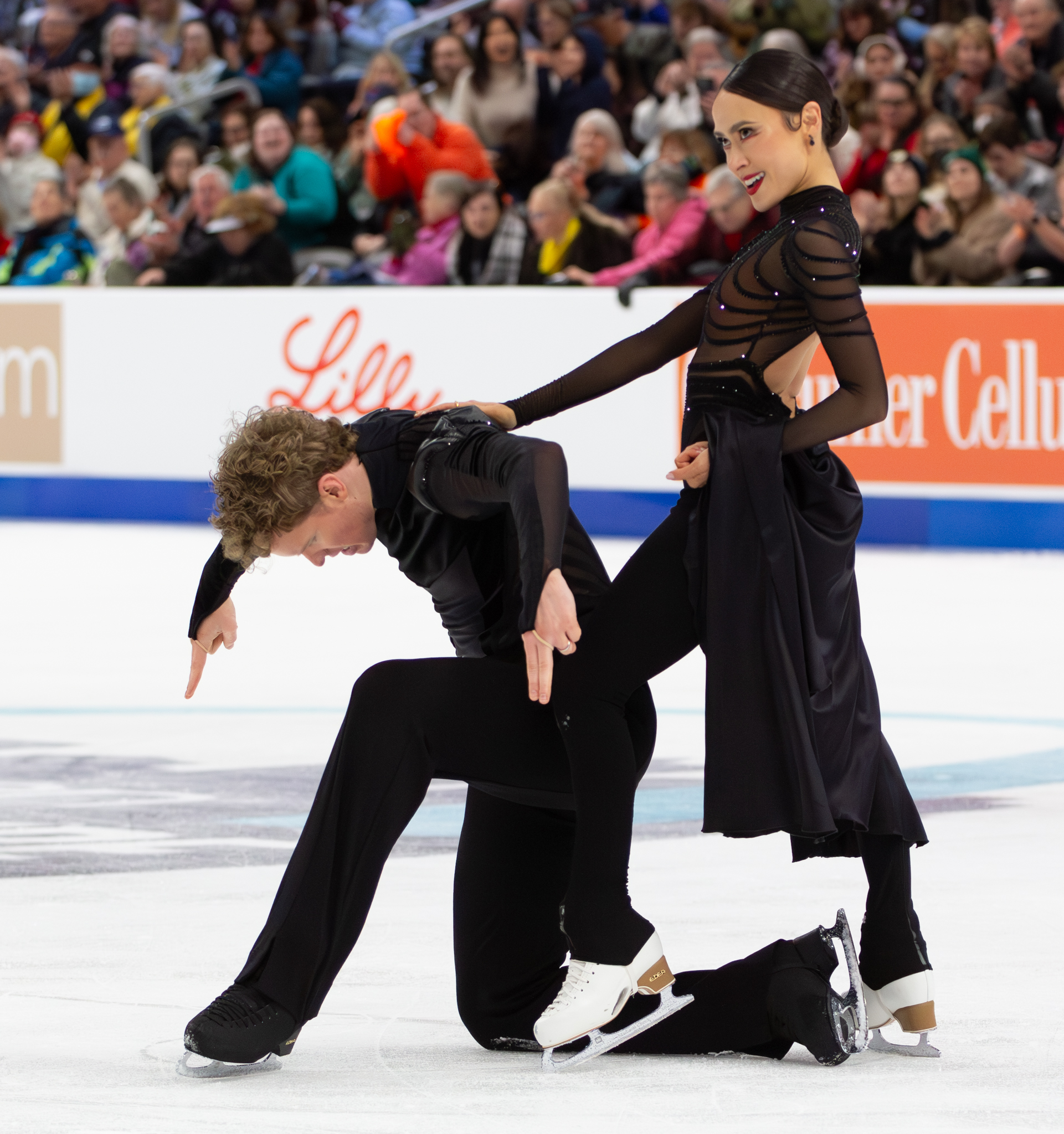
The U.S. figure skating team and gold medalists from the 2026 Winter Olympics (from left to right):
Ilia Malinin; Alysa Liu; Amber Glenn; Ellie Kam and Daniel O'Shea; and Madison Chock and Evan Bates

=== Medal table ===
Rank	Nation	Gold	Silver	Bronze	Total
1	United States	2	1	0	3
2	Japan	1	3	2	6
3	France	1	0	0	1
3	Kazakhstan	1	0	0	1
5	Georgia	0	1	0	1
6	Canada	0	0	1	1
6	Germany	0	0	1	1
6	Italy	0	0	1	1
Totals (8 entries)		5	5	5	15

== Records ==
The following new record high score was set during this competition.

Record high scores
Date	Skater(s)	Event	Segment	Score	Ref.
16 February	(Japan); Riku Miura; Ryuichi Kihara	Pair skating	Free skate	158.13	

== Controversies ==
The results of the ice dance event sparked some backlash, with media outlets questioning how Laurence Fournier Beaudry and Guillaume Cizeron of France won despite notable errors with their twizzle sequences in both their rhythm dance and free dance. Controversy arose when an examination of the judges' results revealed that the French judge, Jézabel Dabouis, had given Madison Chock and Evan Bates of the United States a total score of 129.74 in the free dance, which was over 5.20 points lower than the average score of the remaining eight judges, while at the same time, awarding Fournier Beaudry and Cizeron a total score of 137.45, which was almost three points above the average score of the remaining judges. A spokesperson from the International Skating Union (ISU) responded to the outcry: "It is normal for there to be a range of scores given by different judges in any panel and a number of mechanisms are used to mitigate these variations. The ISU has full confidence in the scores given and remains completely committed to fairness."
