= Mexico at the 1984 Winter Olympics =

- IOC code: MEX
- NOC: Mexican Olympic Committee
- Website: www.soycom.org (in Spanish)

in Sarajevo
- Competitors: 1 in 1 sport
- Medals: Gold 0 Silver 0 Bronze 0 Total 0

Winter Olympics appearances (overview)
- 1928; 1932–1980; 1984; 1988; 1992; 1994; 1998; 2002; 2006; 2010; 2014; 2018; 2022; 2026

One alpine skier from Mexico competed at the 1984 Winter Olympics in Sarajevo, Yugoslavia. It was the first time since 1928 that an athlete from Mexico competed at the Winter Games.

== Alpine skiing ==
Men

Athlete	Event	Final					
Athlete	Event	Run 1	Rank	Run 2	Rank	Total	Rank
Hubertus von Hohenlohe	Downhill	—N/a				1:51.57	38
Hubertus von Hohenlohe	Giant slalom	1:34.82	50	1:35.27	48	3:10.09	48
Hubertus von Hohenlohe	Slalom	1:04.42	41	1:03.75	26	2:08.17	26
