= Alex Christian Benoit =

Mexican alpine skier (born 1964)

Personal information
- Nationality: Mexican
- Born: 16 February 1969 (age 57)

Sport
- Sport: Alpine skiing

Alex Christian Benoit (born 16 February 1964) is a Mexican alpine skier. He competed in three events at the 1988 Winter Olympics.
