= Genaro Díaz =

Mexican bobsledder (1904–1963)

Personal information
- Full name: Genaro Díaz Raigosa
- Born: 19 April 1904 Mexico City, Mexico
- Died: 5 December 1963 (aged 59) Mexico

Sport
- Sport: Bobsleigh

Genaro Díaz Raigosa (Note: In this Spanish name, the first or paternal surname is Díaz and the second or maternal family name is Raigosa.) (19 April 1904 – 5 December 1963) was a Mexican bobsledder. He competed in the five-man event at the 1928 Winter Olympics. He is a relative of Mexican president Porfirio Díaz and the brother of bobsledder José Díaz.
