= Carlos Pruneda =

Mexican alpine skier (born 1961)

Personal information
- Nationality: Mexican
- Born: 3 March 1961 (age 65)

Sport
- Sport: Alpine skiing

Carlos Pruneda (born 3 March 1961) is a Mexican alpine skier. He competed in two events at the 1988 Winter Olympics.
