= Patrice Martell =

Mexican alpine skier (born 1961)

Personal information
- Nationality: Mexican
- Born: 10 February 1961 (age 65)

Sport
- Sport: Alpine skiing

Patrice Martell (born 10 February 1961) is a Mexican alpine skier. He competed in two events at the 1988 Winter Olympics.
