= Roberto Alvárez =

Mexican cross-country skier (born 1960)

Personal information
- Nationality: Mexican
- Born: 15 January 1960 (age 65)

Sport
- Sport: Cross-country skiing

Roberto Alvárez (born 15 January 1960) is a Mexican cross-country skier. He competed at the 1988 Winter Olympics and the 1992 Winter Olympics.
