= Mario Casasús =

Mexican bobsledder

Personal information
- Full name: Mario Casasús Altamirano
- Born: 16 June 1894 Mexico City, Mexico

Sport
- Country: Mexico
- Sport: Bobsleigh

Mario Casasús Altamirano (Note: In this Spanish name, the first or paternal surname is Casasús and the second or maternal family name is Altamirano.) (born 16 June 1894, date of death unknown) was a Mexican bobsledder.

He was born to Joaquín Demetrio Casasús and Catalina Altamirano, daughter of Ignacio Manuel Altamirano. He graduated from Princeton University and since his father's death in 1916, he lived in Paris.

He competed in the five-man event at the 1928 Winter Olympics.

In 1930 he married model and MGM starlet Edna Mae Alexander Volck (née Alexander, primo voto Volck). They had a son in 1931, divorcing in 1934.
