= Donovan Carrillo =

Mexican figure skater (born 1999)

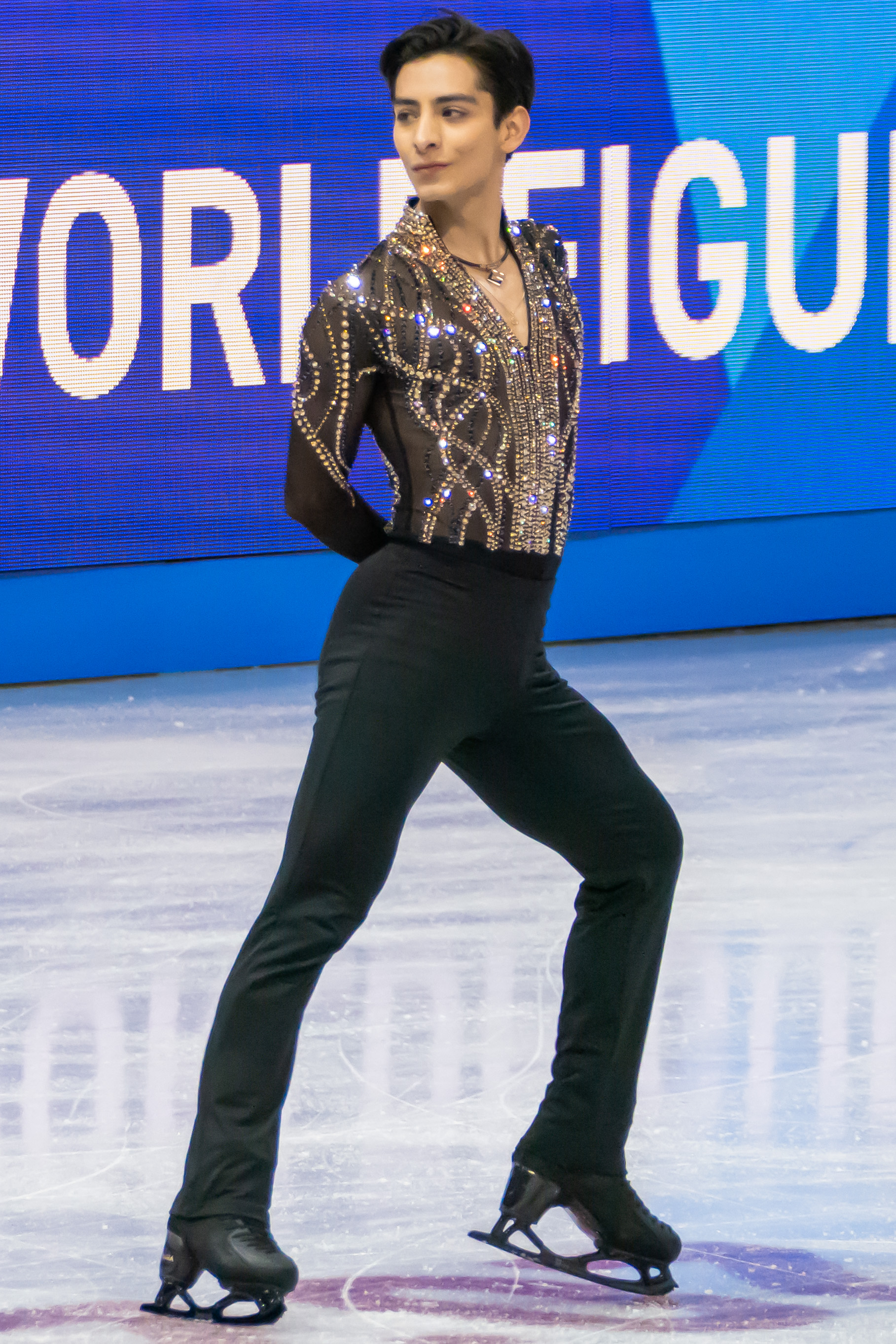
- Donovan Carrillo at the 2025 World Championships

Personal information
- Full name: Donovan Daniel Carrillo Suazo
- Born: 17 November 1999 (age 26) Zapopan, Jalisco, Mexico
- Height: 1.71 m (5 ft 7 in)

Figure skating career
- Country: Mexico
- Discipline: Men's singles
- Coach: Jonathan Mills, Myke Gillman; Gregorio Nuñez (until 2023)
- Skating club: The Skating Club of Willowdale (2026) Former Club: Thornhill Figure Skating Club (2023-2026)
- Began skating: 2008
- Highest WS: 42nd

Medal record
Mexican Championships
Gold medal – first place	2018	Singles
Gold medal – first place	2019	Singles
Gold medal – first place	2020	Singles
Gold medal – first place	2022 Naucalpan	Singles
Gold medal – first place	2023 Naucalpan	Singles
Gold medal – first place	2024 Puebla	Singles
Gold medal – first place	2025 Metepec	Singles

Donovan Daniel Carrillo Suazo (born 17 November 1999) is a Mexican figure skater. He is the 2023 NRW Trophy silver medalist, 2023 Tayside Trophy silver medalist, 2019 Philadelphia International silver medalist, and an eight-time Mexican national champion (2017–2019, 2020–2025). He has competed in the final segment at six ISU Championships – three World Championships (2018, 2021, 2024), four Four Continents (2018–2020, 2024), and the 2018 World Junior Championships. He has earned the highest placement by any Mexican skater at a World Championships.

He represented Mexico at the 2022 and 2026 Winter Olympics, advancing to the free skate segment both times.

== Personal life ==
Carrillo was born on 17 November 1999, in Zapopan, Jalisco, Mexico. Before taking up skating, he was enrolled in gymnastics and diving. His parents are physical education teachers. He has three sisters.

== Skating career ==
=== Early years ===
Carrillo began learning to skate in Guadalajara when he was eight years old until his home rink closed. In 2013, he moved to León to keep training with his Coach Gregorio Nuñez.

His junior international debut came in September 2013 at a Junior Grand Prix (JGP) event in Mexico City, where he placed 15th overall.

=== 2014–2015 season ===
Carrillo received two JGP assignments. In September, he placed twenty-first at the 2014 Czech Skate after placing twenty-first in both segments. In October, he placed twenty-second at the 2014 JGP Pokal der Blauen Schwerter. Later in the season, he won the junior men's title at the Mexican Championships.

=== 2015–2016 season ===
In 2015, Carrillo placed eighth at the 2015 Santa Claus Cup in Budapest in the junior men's competition.

=== 2016–2017 season ===
Returning to the JGP series, Carrillo placed thirteenth in September in Yokohama, Japan. In October, he finished ninth at a JGP competition in Dresden, Germany.

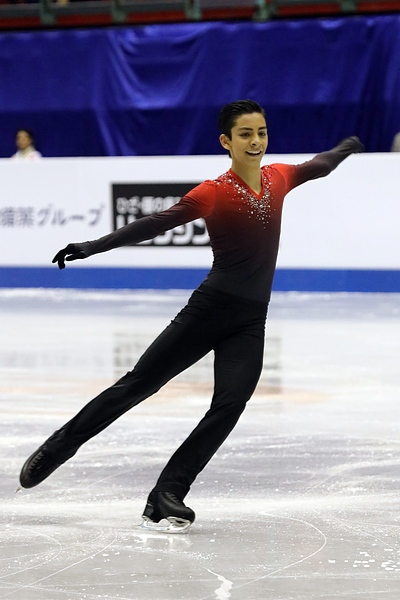
Carrillo at the 2017 World Junior Championships

In March, he placed twenty-seventh in the short program at the 2017 World Junior Championships in Taipei, Taiwan, and did not advance to the free skate.

=== 2017–2018 season: Senior debut ===
Making his senior international debut, Carrillo placed ninth at the Philadelphia Summer International in early August 2017. Later that month, he achieved his career-best JGP result, finishing seventh in Brisbane, Australia. In September, he competed at the 2017 CS Nebelhorn Trophy, the final qualifying opportunity for the 2018 Winter Olympics. He ranked nineteenth in the short program, twelfth in the free skate, and fourteenth overall, which was not enough for an Olympic spot.

In January, Carrillo qualified to the final segment at the 2018 Four Continents Championships in Taipei; he ranked twenty-second in the short program, seventeenth in the free skate, and eighteenth overall. In March, Carrillo qualified for the final segment at Junior Worlds, placing eighteenth in the short program and twenty-second in the free skate to finish twenty-first overall. Two weeks later, at the World Championships, Donovan placed twenty-fourth in the short program and qualified for the free. He placed twenty-first in the free program and finished twenty-second overall.

=== 2018–2019 season ===
Carrillo started the season at 2018 JGP Bratislava, where he placed eleventh in both segments and placed eleventh overall. He was offered a second Junior Grand Prix assignment in Linz, Austria, but had to decline because he could not afford to attend the competition. He was assigned to the 2018 CS Autumn Classic International but withdrew before the event. He had sustained a right ankle injury. At the 2019 Four Continents Championships in January, he placed fourteenth in the short program (and thus qualified for the final segment), placed twentieth in the free program, and seventeenth overall. At Four Continents, Carrillo landed a triple Axel for the first time.

In February 2019, the Comisión Nacional de Cultura Física y Deporte announced that Carrillo would be granted funding beginning in March. Carrillo aggravated his ankle injury before the 2019 World Championships, and did not make the free skate.

=== 2019–2020 season ===
Carrillo won his first international medal, a silver, at the 2019 Philadelphia Summer International. Assigned to two Challenger events, he placed tenth at the 2019 CS Autumn Classic International and seventeenth at the 2019 CS Golden Spin of Zagreb. Competing at the 2020 Four Continents Championships, Carrillo placed fifteenth with new personal bests but came up 0.20 points short of the free skate technical score necessary to qualify to compete at the 2020 World Championships.

Due to the pandemic, Carrillo could not train on ice for four months, but the delivery of a harness and spinners allowed him to continue practicing jumps at his coach's house.

=== 2020–2021 season ===
At the International Challenge Cup, held in late February in the Netherlands, Carrillo earned the necessary technical minimum to compete at the 2021 World Championships, which took place in Stockholm in March. In Sweden, he qualified to his second Worlds free skate by placing twenty-third in the short program. Ranked nineteenth in the final segment, he would finish twentieth overall. With his placement, he qualified a men's singles quota spot for Mexico at the 2022 Winter Olympics.

=== 2021–2022 season: Beijing Olympics ===
Carrillo started the season at the Skating Club of Boston's Cranberry Cup, where he finished in ninth place. Competing at the Festival Abierto Mexicano, Carrillo won the gold medal and became the first Mexican skater ever to land a quadruple jump, the quadruple Salchow, in a competition. At the 2021 U.S. Classic, Carrillo finished in fifth place with new personal bests. At the 2021 CS Finlandia Trophy, he became the first Mexican to land a quadruple Salchow in combination in an international competition. Scoring a new personal best in his free skate, Carrillo finished in fifteenth.

After winning his fourth national title at the Mexican championships, Carrillo was named to the Mexican Olympic team and opted to withdraw from the 2022 Four Continents Championships to minimize the risk of catching COVID-19 in the interim. Shortly afterward, he was named one of Mexico's flagbearers for the opening ceremonies, alongside alpine skier Sarah Schleper. Carrillo scored a new personal best of 79.69 in the short program of the Olympic men's event, placing nineteenth and becoming the first Mexican skater to qualify for the free skate segment at the Olympic Games. He called it "a dream come true." Placing twenty-second in the free skate, he finished twenty-second overall.

Carrillo was scheduled to finish the season at the 2022 World Championships in Montpellier but was forced to withdraw after his skates were lost in transit.

=== 2022–2023 season ===
Carrillo finished eighth at the 2022 CS U.S. Classic and then was invited to make his senior Grand Prix debut at the 2022 Skate America. He finished twelfth at the event.

Carrillo missed the rest of the 2022–23 figure skating season due to an ankle injury that required surgery, which he had done in December.

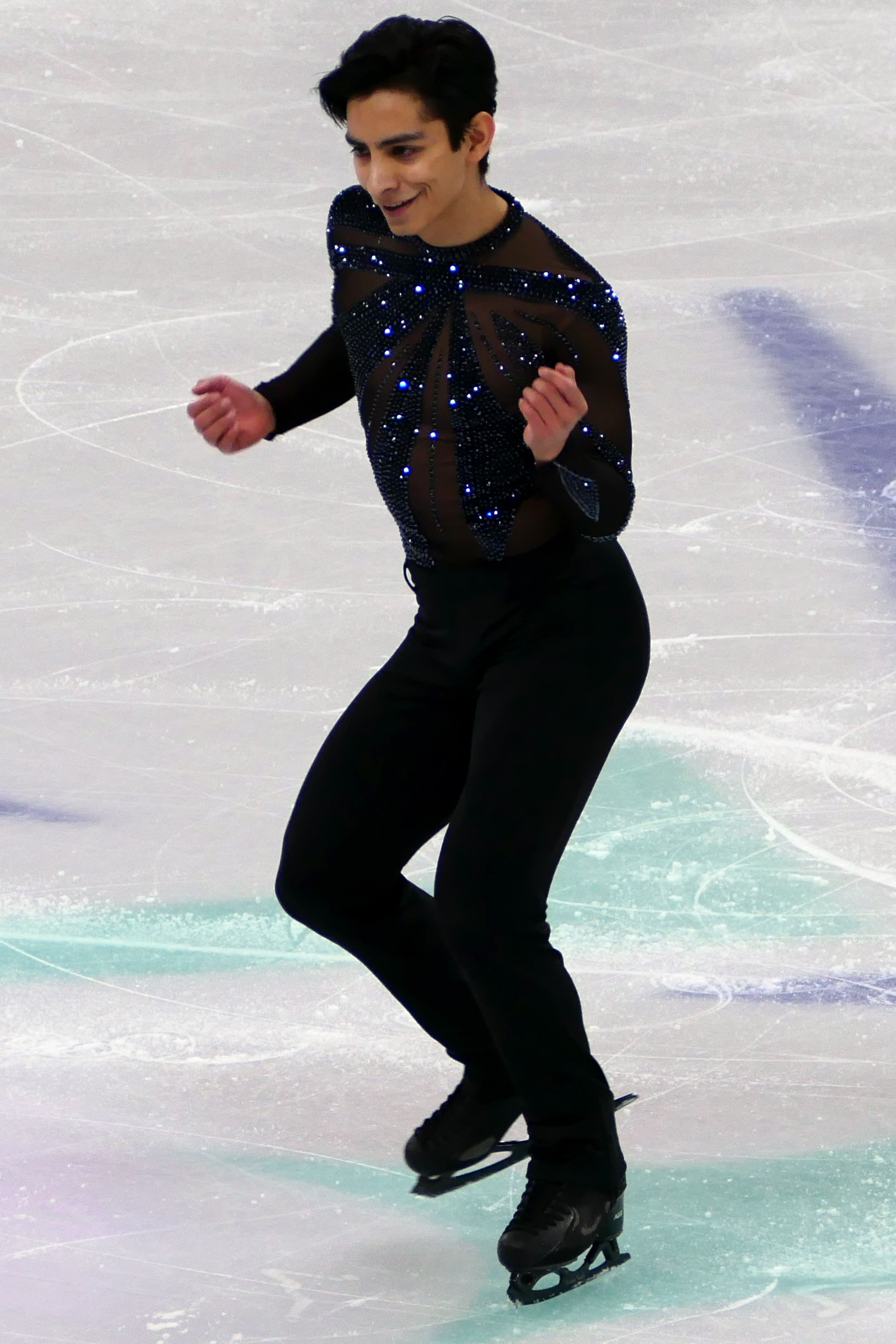
Carrillo performing his short program at the 2024 World Championships

=== 2023–2024 season ===
In July 2023, Carrillo announced that he had relocated to Toronto, Ontario, to train at the Thornhill Figure Skating Club, coached by Jonathan Mills and Myke Gillman.

He started the season with a fifth-place finish at the 2023 Cranberry Cup International, before coming eleventh at the 2023 CS Autumn Classic International. Carrillo won the silver medal at Tayside Trophy in October and silver medal at the NRW Trophy a month later.

Carrillo was fifteenth at both the Four Continents and World Championships.

=== 2024–2025 season ===
Carrillo began the season at the Asian Open Figure Skating Trophy, finishing in sixth place. In September, Carrillo won his seventh national title at the Mexican Figure Skating Championships. Going on to compete on the 2024–25 Grand Prix circuit, Carrillo finished twelfth at 2024 Skate America. He followed this up by winning silver at the 2024 NRW Trophy, the 2025 Bavarian Open, and the 2025 International Challenge Cup.

In February, Carrillo finished eleventh at the 2025 Four Continents Championships in Seoul, South Korea. One month later, he competed at the 2025 World Championships, held in Boston, Massachusetts, United States. He placed twenty-seventh in the short program and did not advance to the free skate segment of the competition.

=== 2025–2026 season: Milano Cortina Olympics ===
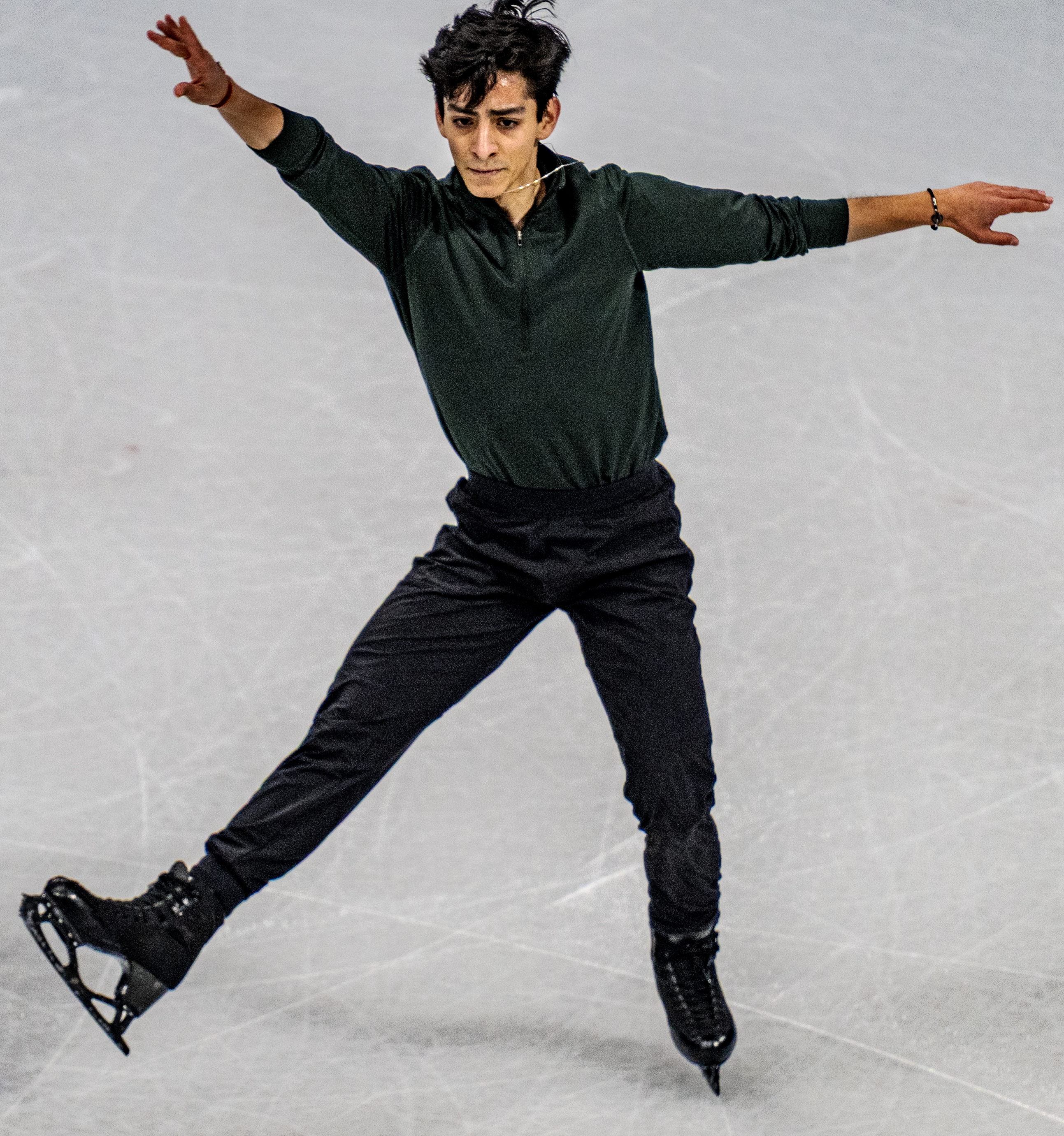
Carrillo during a practice session at the 2026 Winter Olympics

Carrillo started the season with a sixth-place finish at the 2025 CS Cranberry Cup International. The following month, he won the bronze medal at the ISU Skate to Milano, the final qualifier for the 2026 Winter Olympics. With this result, he secured a spot for Mexico in the men's singles discipline at the upcoming Games. A couple weeks following that event, Carrillo placed tenth at the 2025 CS Trialeti Trophy.

In January, he competed at the 2026 Four Continents Championships, finishing in fifteenth place. That same month, it was announced that Carrillo and alpine skier, Sarah Schleper, had been selected as flag bearers for Mexico during the Olympic opening ceremony.

On 10 February, Carrillo competed in the short program segment at the 2026 Winter Olympics, placing twenty-third and advancing to the free skate segment. "Today I say it again with my heart in my hand: I am in an Olympic final. For the second time," he said following the short program. "It's not just a classification. It's all that wasn't seen: the hard days, the doubts, the fatigue, the consistency when no one was watching. Skating here, representing Mexico and Latin America, remains a privilege that I will never normalize." Two days later, Carrillo placed nineteenth in the free skate and finished in twenty-second place overall.

Carrillo and Sarah Schleper were subsequently announced as Mexico's flag bearers for the Olympic closing ceremony.

In March, Carrillo completed his season at the 2026 World Championships. He placed fourteenth in the short program and twentieth in the free skate, finishing nineteenth overall.

=== 2026–2027 season ===
Carrillo opened the new season placing 10th at the 2026 Kinoshita Group Cup.

== Programs ==
Season	Short program	Free skating	Exhibition
2026–2027		Al Maghfera by Les 202 Chanteurs et Musiciens, Al Sahm al Taéh by Hughes De Courson; Alatul Concerto pour Kaval en Flute by Les 202 Chanteurs et Musiciens by Wolfgang Amadeus Mozart; Ad Martem by Havasi	
2025–2026	Hip Hip Chin Chin (Yaziko Club Mix) by Club des Belugas; The Beat Hip Hip Chin Chin (Samba) by Watazu; Hip Hip Chin Chin by Club des Belugas ft. Brenda Boykin; Hip Hip Chin Chin (Smooth Return Mix) by Club des Belugas choreo. by Romain Haguenauer	My Way for Donovan by Cédric Tour; My Way by Jacques Revaux & Paul Anka performed by Elvis Presley; Trouble (from Elvis) performed by Austin Butler; Jailhouse Rock by Elvis Presley; A Little Less Conversation by Elvis Presley & Junkie XL choreo. by Benoît Richaud	
2024–2025	Hip Hip Chin Chin (Yaziko Club Mix) by Club des Belugas; The Beat Hip Hip Chin Chin (Samba) by Watazu; Hip Hip Chin Chin by Club des Belugas ft. Brenda Boykin; Hip Hip Chin Chin (Smooth Return Mix) by Club des Belugas choreo. by Romain Haguenauer	Tres Palabras by Osvaldo Farrés; Deja Que Salga la Luna by José Alfredo Jiménez; La Bikina by Rubén Fuentes choreo. by Myke Gillman	NUEVAYoL; EoO; BAILE INoLVIDABLE; CAFé CON RON; LA MuDANZA by Bad Bunny; Los Luchadores by Sonora Santanera; Bailen Rochas y Chetas by Nene Malo; Después de la Playa by Bad Bunny
2023–2024	SexyBack by Justin Timberlake and Timbaland; 4 Minutes by Madonna, Justin Timberlake and Timbaland choreo. by Benoît Richaud	Bésame Mucho by Consuelo Velázquez; Historia de un amor by Carlos Eleta Almarán; Cuba by DJ Rebel and Robert Abigail choreo. by Myke Gillman	The Hills; Starboy; Can't Feel My Face; Save Your Tears; Blinding Lights by The Weeknd
2022–2023	Georgia on My Mind; What'd I Say by Ray Charles; Sleep by Coke Beats choreo. by Benoît Richaud	James Bond: Gun Barrel (from No Time To Die) by Hans Zimmer; The Name's Bond...James Bond (from Casino Royale) by David Arnold; Skyfall by Adele; Another Way to Die (from Quantum Of Solace) by Jack White and Alicia Keys; James Bond Theme by Monty Norman and John Barry arranged by Moby choreo. by Benoît Richaud	Los Luchadores by Sonora Santanera; Bailen Rochas y Chetas by Nene Malo; Después de la Playa by Bad Bunny
2021–2022	Black Magic Woman; Shake It by Carlos Santana choreo. by Benoît Richaud	Perhaps, Perhaps, Perhaps by Osvaldo Farrés performed by Daniel Boaventura & Carlos Rivera; Sway performed by Dean Martin; María performed by Ricky Martin; Bailar by Deorro choreo. by Gregorio Nuñez	
2020–2021	In the Mood by Glenn Miller choreo. by Gregorio Nuñez	Perhaps, Perhaps, Perhaps by Osvaldo Farrés performed by Daniel Boaventura & Carlos Rivera; Sway Mix by Pedro Infante performed by Michael Bublé	Pinball by Akira Kiteshi; Canción del Mariachi by Los Lobos and Antonio Banderas; El Mariachi Loco by Mariachi de la Ciudad de México de Pepe Villela
2019–2020	In the Mood by Glenn Miller choreo. by Gregorio Nuñez	Aranjuez performed by Il Divo choreo. by Gregorio Nuñez	Pinball by Akira Kiteshi; Canción del Mariachi by Los Lobos and Antonio Banderas; El Mariachi Loco by Mariachi de la Ciudad de México de Pepe Villela
2018–2019	Jazz Machine by Black Machine; Picante by Vanessa-Mae	Ya lo se que tu te vas by Juan Gabriel	Capone by Ronan Hardiman choreo. by Gregorio Núñez
2017–2018	Capone by Ronan Hardiman choreo. by Gregorio Núñez	Hasta Que Te Conocí by Juan Gabriel performed by Raúl Di Blasio choreo. by Gregorio Núñez	
2016–2017	Mambo Mix by Pérez Prado choreo. by Gregorio Núñez	Hasta Que Te Conocí by Juan Gabriel performed by Raúl Di Blasio choreo. by Gregorio Núñez	
2015–2016	Mexican Danzones Mix choreo. by Gregorio Núñez	Mambo Mix by Perez Prado choreo. by Gregorio Núñez	
2014–2015	Mexican Danzones Mix choreo. by Gregorio Núñez	The Prince of Egypt by Hans Zimmer; The Mummy by Jerry Goldsmith choreo. by Gregorio Núñez	

== Competitive highlights ==
- GP – Event of the ISU Grand Prix Series
- JGP – Event of the ISU Junior Grand Prix Series
- CS – Event of the ISU Challenger Series
- TBD – Assigned
- WD – Withdrew from competition

Competition placements at senior level
Season	2017–18	2018–19	2019–20	2020–21	2021–22	2022–23	2023–24	2024–25	2025–26	2026–27
Winter Olympics					22nd				22nd	
World Championships	22nd	33rd		20th			15th	27th	19th	
Four Continents Championships	18th	17th	15th				15th	11th	15th	
Mexican Championships	1st	1st	1st		1st	1st	1st	1st	1st	
GP Skate America						12th		12th		5th
CS Autumn Classic			10th				11th			
CS Cranberry Cup					9th		5th			
CS Finlandia Trophy					15th					
CS Golden Spin of Zagreb			17th							
CS Kinoshita Group Cup										10th
CS Nebelhorn Trophy	14th									
CS Trialeti Trophy									10th	
CS U.S. Classic					5th	8th				
NRW Trophy							2nd	2nd		
Philadelphia Summer	9th		2nd							
Skate to Milano									3rd	
Tayside Trophy							2nd			1st
Asian Open Trophy								6th		
Challenge Cup			10th	9th				2nd		

Competition placements at junior level
Season	2013–14	2014–15	2015–16	2016–17	2017–18	2018–19
World Junior Championships				27th	21st	
Mexican Championships		1st				
JGP Australia					7th	
JGP Czech Republic		21st				
JGP Germany		22nd		9th		
JGP Japan				13th		
JGP Mexico	15th					
JGP Slovakia						11th
Santa Claus Cup			8th			

== Detailed results ==
ISU personal best scores in the +5/-5 GOE System
Segment	Type	Score	Event
Total	TSS	240.38	2026 Skate America
Short program	TSS	86.49	2026 Skate America
Short program	TES	48.98	2026 Skate America
Short program	PCS	37.51	2026 Skate America
Free skating	TSS	153.89	2026 Skate America
Free skating	TES	77.10	2026 Skate America
Free skating	PCS	77.79	2026 Skate America

ISU personal best scores in the +3/-3 GOE System
Segment	Type	Score	Event
Total	TSS	200.76	2018 World Championships
Short program	TSS	68.13	2018 World Championships
Short program	TES	35.63	2018 World Championships
Short program	PCS	32.50	2018 World Championships
Free skating	TSS	132.63	2018 World Championships
Free skating	TES	68.50	2018 Four Continents Championships
Free skating	PCS	65.78	2018 World Championships

=== Senior level ===
Results in the 2017–18 season
Date	Event	SP		FS		Total	
Date	Event	P	Score	P	Score	P	Score
3–6 Aug 2017	(United States) 2017 Philadelphia Summer International	7	65.12	9	119.13	9	184.45
27–30 Sep 2017	(Germany) 2017 CS Nebelhorn Trophy	19	55.83	12	121.83	14	177.66
22–28 Jan 2018	(Taiwan) 2018 Four Continents Championships	22	59.07	17	126.84	18	185.91
19–25 Mar 2018	(Italy) 2018 World Championships	24	68.13	21	132.63	22	200.76

Results in the 2018–19 season
Date	Event	SP		FS		Total	
Date	Event	P	Score	P	Score	P	Score
7–10 Feb 2019	(United States) 2019 Four Continents Championships	14	71.16	20	103.54	17	174.70
18–24 Mar 2019	(Japan) 2019 World Championships	33	54.99	—N/a	—N/a	33	54.99

Results in the 2019–20 season
Date	Event	SP		FS		Total	
Date	Event	P	Score	P	Score	P	Score
31 Jul – 3 Aug 2019	(United States) 2019 Philadelphia Summer International	2	69.08	4	127.71	2	196.79
12–14 Sep 2019	(Canada) 2019 CS Autumn Classic International	8	65.94	10	109.05	10	174.99
4–7 Dec 2019	(Croatia) 2019 CS Golden Spin of Zagreb	17	66.59	18	117.28	17	183.87
4–9 Feb 2020	(South Korea) 2020 Four Continents Championships	13	73.13	16	127.96	15	201.09
20–23 Feb 2020	(Netherlands) 2020 International Challenge Cup	7	68.93	11	117.63	10	186.56

Results in the 2020–21 season
Date	Event	SP		FS		Total	
Date	Event	P	Score	P	Score	P	Score
26–28 Feb 2021	(Netherlands) 2021 International Challenge Cup	11	61.45	8	129.15	9	190.60
22–28 Mar 2021	(Sweden) 2021 World Championships	23	73.91	19	130.87	20	204.78

Results in the 2021–22 season
Date	Event	SP		FS		Total	
Date	Event	P	Score	P	Score	P	Score
11–15 Aug 2021	(United States) 2021 Cranberry Cup International	8	63.70	10	106.38	9	170.08
14–17 Sep 2021	(United States) 2021 U.S. International Classic	4	77.48	7	130.93	5	208.41
7–10 Oct 2021	(Finland) 2021 CS Finlandia Trophy	21	61.06	14	131.48	15	192.54
8–10 Feb 2022	(China) 2022 Winter Olympics	19	79.69	22	138.44	22	218.13

Results in the 2022–23 season
Date	Event	SP		FS		Total	
Date	Event	P	Score	P	Score	P	Score
12–16 Sep 2022	(United States) 2022 CS U.S. Classic	9	68.10	10	113.34	8	181.44
21–23 Oct 2022	(United States) 2022 Skate America	10	69.18	11	119.10	12	188.28

Results in the 2023–24 season
Date	Event	SP		FS		Total	
Date	Event	P	Score	P	Score	P	Score
9–13 Aug 2023	(United States) 2023 Cranberry Cup International	8	68.68	5	128.84	5	197.52
14–17 Sep 2023	(Canada) 2023 CS Autumn Classic International	12	49.15	11	104.53	11	153.68
14–15 Oct 2023	(United Kingdom) 2023 Tayside Trophy	2	73.36	3	127.75	2	201.11
16–19 Nov 2023	(Germany) 2023 NRW Trophy	2	69.34	2	136.36	2	205.70
27 Nov – 3 Dec 2023	(Mexico) 2024 Mexican Championships	1	84.74	1	139.13	1	223.87
30 Jan – 4 Feb 2024	(China) 2024 Four Continents Championships	14	67.66	14	134.81	15	202.47
18–24 Mar 2024	(Canada) 2024 World Championships	15	80.19	14	152.48	15	232.67

Results in the 2024–25 season
Date	Event	SP		FS		Total	
Date	Event	P	Score	P	Score	P	Score
2–6 Sep 2024	(Hong Kong) 2024 Asian Open Trophy	9	65.96	5	138.46	6	204.42
18–20 Oct 2024	(United States) 2024 Skate America	9	67.48	12	128.32	12	195.80
13–17 Nov 2024	(Germany) 2024 NRW Trophy	3	62.56	2	131.45	2	194.01
18–24 Nov 2024	(Mexico) 2025 Mexican Championships	1	69.87	1	139.41	1	209.28
13-16 Feb 2025	(Netherlands) 2025 Challenge Cup	3	65.04	1	140.50	2	205.54
19–23 Feb 2025	(South Korea) 2025 Four Continents Championships	13	68.50	12	140.23	11	208.73
24–30 Mar 2025	(United States) 2025 World Championships	27	71.55	—N/a	—N/a	27	71.55

Results in the 2025–26 season
Date	Event	SP		FS		Total	
Date	Event	P	Score	P	Score	P	Score
Aug 7–10, 2025	(United States) 2025 CS Cranberry Cup International	6	70.65	4	137.86	6	208.51
Sep 18–21, 2025	(China) 2025 Skate to Milano	2	84.97	9	137.39	3	222.36
Oct 8–11, 2025	(Georgia (country)) 2025 CS Trialeti Trophy	10	70.92	9	134.13	10	205.05
Jan 21–25, 2026	(China) 2026 Four Continents Championships	14	74.00	16	139.05	15	213.05
Feb 10–13, 2026	(Italy) 2026 Winter Olympics	23	75.56	19	143.50	22	219.06
Mar 24–29, 2026	(Czech Republic) 2026 World Championships	14	79.65	20	140.09	19	219.74
May 18–24, 2026	(Mexico) 2026 Mexican Championships	1	85.62	1	136.50	1	221.92

Results in the 2026–27 season
Date	Event	SP		FS		Total	
Date	Event	P	Score	P	Score	P	Score
Sept 4–6, 2026	(Japan) 2026 Kinoshita Group Cup	15	62.96	9	138.83	10	201.79
Oct 10-11, 2026	(United Kingdom) 2026 Tayside Trophy	2	73.51	1	161.12	1	234.63
Nov 13–15, 2026	(United States) 2026 Skate America	3	86.49	5	153.89	5	240.38

=== Junior level ===
Results in the 2013–14 season
Date	Event	SP		FS		Total	
Date	Event	P	Score	P	Score	P	Score
4–7 Sep 2013	2013 JGP Mexico	15	31.52	17	53.65	15	85.17

Results in the 2014–15 season
Date	Event	SP		FS		Total	
Date	Event	P	Score	P	Score	P	Score
3–6 Sep 2014	2014 JGP Czech Republic	21	34.39	21	58.62	21	93.01
1–4 Oct 2014	2014 JGP Germany	22	38.38	22	70.79	22	109.17

Results in the 2015–16 season
Date	Event	SP		FS		Total	
Date	Event	P	Score	P	Score	P	Score
8–11 Sep 2015	(Hungary) 2015 Santa Claus Cup	5	46.51	9	75.95	8	122.46

Results in the 2016–17 season
Date	Event	SP		FS		Total	
Date	Event	P	Score	P	Score	P	Score
8–11 Sep 2016	2016 JGP Japan	12	53.64	12	102.04	13	155.68
5–8 Oct 2016	2016 JGP Germany	11	54.78	10	114.37	9	169.15
13–19 Mar 2017	(Taiwan) 2017 World Junior Championships	27	53.92	—N/a	—N/a	27	53.92

Results in the 2017–18 season
Date	Event	SP		FS		Total	
Date	Event	P	Score	P	Score	P	Score
23–26 Aug 2017	2017 JGP Australia	9	51.61	5	121.80	7	173.41
5–11 Mar 2018	(Bulgaria) 2018 World Junior Championships	19	61.37	22	107.31	21	168.68

Results in the 2018–19 season
Date	Event	SP		FS		Total	
Date	Event	P	Score	P	Score	P	Score
22–25 Aug 2018	2018 JGP Slovakia	11	58.09	11	107.60	11	165.69

Olympic Games
Preceded by Gabriela López and Rommel Pacheco	Flagbearer for Mexico (with Sarah Schleper); Beijing 2022	Succeeded by Emiliano Hernández and Alejandra Orozco

Olympic Games
Preceded by Emiliano Hernández and Alejandra Orozco	Flagbearer for Mexico (with Sarah Schleper); Milano Cortina 2026	Succeeded by
