= Lorenzo Elizaga =

Mexican bobsledder (1903–1985)

Personal information
- Full name: Lorenzo Manuel Porfirio Elízaga y Romero Rubio
- Born: 11 April 1903; Mexico City, Mexico
- Died: 8 March 1985 (aged 81); Madrid, Spain

Sport
- Country: Mexico
- Sport: Bobsleigh

Lorenzo Manuel Porfirio Elízaga y Romero Rubio (11 April 1903 – 8 March 1985) was a Mexican bobsledder. He competed in the five-man event at the 1928 Winter Olympics.
