= Mexican Olympic Committee =

- Country: Mexico
- Code: MEX
- Created: 1923
- Recognized: 1923
- Continental Association: PASO
- Headquarters: Mexico City, Mexico
- President: María José Alcalá
- Secretary General: Mario García de la Torre
- Website: www.soycom.org (in Spanish)

The Mexican Olympic Committee (Spanish: Comité Olímpico Mexicano, COM) (IOC Code: MEX) is the organization that represents Mexican athletes in the International Olympic Committee (IOC), the Pan American Games and the Central American and Caribbean Games. It was created and formally recognized by the IOC in 1923. The organization is currently directed by María José Alcalá.

The Mexican Olympic Committee is headquartered in Mexico City, Mexico.

== History ==
As early as the 1900 Universal Exposition of Paris, Baron Pierre de Coubertin had the idea of Mexico entering the next Olympic Games. In 1901, Coubertin met with the Mexican ambassador in Belgium, where they decided to form the National Olympic Committee of Mexico. After this meeting, they sent a letter on May 25, 1901 to General Porfirio Diaz (the president of Mexico at the time) to inform him that Beistegui would be the representative of Mexico before the International Olympic Committee. However, Mexico (after participating in the 1900 Summer Olympics) did not participate in the Olympics again until 1924.

In 1923, Baillet Latour, then vice-president of the International Olympic Committee, visited Latin America to invite countries to go to the Paris 1924 Summer Olympics. He arrived in Mexico after visiting the countries of Argentina, Brazil, Chile, Paraguay and Uruguay on February 16, 1923.

== See also ==
- Mexico at the Olympics
