= Trinidad and Tobago at the 1972 Summer Olympics =

- IOC code: TTO (TRI used at these Games)
- NOC: Trinidad and Tobago Olympic Committee

in Munich
- Competitors: 19 (18 men, 1 woman) in 4 sports
- Flag bearer: Hasely Crawford
- Medals: Gold 0 Silver 0 Bronze 0 Total 0

Summer Olympics appearances (overview)
- 1948; 1952; 1956; 1960; 1964; 1968; 1972; 1976; 1980; 1984; 1988; 1992; 1996; 2000; 2004; 2008; 2012; 2016; 2020; 2024; 2028

Other related appearances
- British West Indies (1960 S)

Athletes from Trinidad and Tobago competed at the 1972 Summer Olympics in Munich, West Germany. Trinidad and Tobago was represented by nineteen athletes and nine officials, competing in athletics, cycling, sailing, and swimming.

== Athletics ==
Men's 100 metres

- Ainsely Armstrong

- First Heat — 10.56s (→ did not advance)

- Rudolph Reid

- First Heat — 10.74s (→ did not advance)

Men's 800 metres

- Lennox Stewart

- Heat — 1:48.7 (→ did not advance)

Men's 4 × 100 m Relay

- Ainsely Armstrong, Rudolph Reid, Bertram Lovell, and Hasely Crawford

- Heat — DNS (→ did not advance)

- Arthur Cooper
- Trevor James
- Charles Joseph
- Patrick Marshall
- Laura Pierre
- Edwin Roberts

== Cycling ==
Six cyclists represented Trinidad and Tobago in 1972

Individual road race

- Patrick Gellineau — did not finish (→ no ranking)
- Clive Saney — did not finish (→ no ranking)
- Anthony Sellier — did not finish (→ no ranking)
- Vernon Stauble — did not finish (→ no ranking)

Team time trial

- Pat Gellineau
- Clive Saney
- Anthony Sellier
- Vernon Stauble

Sprint

- Leslie King
- Winston Attong

1000m time trial

- Leslie King

- Final — 1:09.96 (→ 19th place)

Individual pursuit

- Vernon Stauble

Team pursuit

- Pat Gellineau
- Clive Saney
- Anthony Sellier
- Vernon Stauble

== Sailing ==
Men's Flying Dutchman

- Richard Bennett and David Farfan

== Swimming ==
Men's 100m Freestyle

- Geoffrey Ferreira

- Heat — 56.27s (→ did not advance)
