= Cycling at the 1988 Summer Olympics – Men's sprint =

Men's sprint at the Games of the XXIV Olympiad
- Venue: Seoul Olympic Velodrome
- Dates: 21–24 September
- Competitors: 25 from 25 nations

Medalists
1st place, gold medalist(s)		Lutz Heßlich; East Germany
2nd place, silver medalist(s)		Nikolai Kovsh; Soviet Union
3rd place, bronze medalist(s)		Gary Neiwand; Australia

The men's sprint cycling event at the 1988 Summer Olympics took place from 21 to 24 September and was one of the nine cycling events at the 1988 Olympics. There were 25 competitors from 25 nations. After the 1984 Games had featured a humongously bloated 34-cyclist, 11-round, 63-match competition, the competition size was cut down by restricting nations to one cyclist yet again (the rule in place from 1928 to 1956 and in 1976 and 1980) and instituting a qualifying round: this reduced the format to 25 cyclists, 8 rounds (including the qualifying round), and 29 matches (not included the time trials in the qualifying round). The event was won by Lutz Heßlich of East Germany, the 1980 gold medalist who was unable to compete in 1984 due to the Soviet-led boycott. Soviet cyclist Nikolai Kovsh took silver, the best result to date for the Soviets. Gary Neiwand of Australia earned bronze; for the Australians, it was the first medal in the event since 1972.

== Background ==
This was the 19th appearance of the event, which has been held at every Summer Olympics except 1904 and 1912. None of the quarterfinalists from 1984 returned. The East German team was in the height of its dominance of the event, rising in the 1970s, peaking in the late 1980s, and continuing into the 1990s. The last nine medalists at the World Championships (gold, silver, and bronze in 1985, 1986, and 1987) had all been East German. Lutz Heßlich had won in 1985 and 1987 and finished second in 1986; he had also won the Olympic gold medal in 1980 (not competed in 1984 due to the Soviet-led boycott). When he was chosen to represent East Germany, he was an overwhelming favorite—everyone who had challenged him in the last few years was unable to compete due to the one-cyclist-per-nation rule that had been resurrected after the 1984 Games had allowed two per nation.

Bolivia and Ecuador each made their debut in the men's sprint. France made its 19th appearance, the only nation to have competed at every appearance of the event.

== Competition format ==
This sprint competition involved a series of head-to-head matches along with the new qualifying round of time trials. There were five main match rounds, with two repechages. Only one-round repechages were used.

- Qualifying round: Each of the 25 competitors completed a 200 metre flying time trial (reaching full speed before timing started for the last 200 metres). The top 24 advanced to the match rounds, seeded based on their time in the qualifying round. With 25 riders starting, only the slowest cyclist was eliminated.
- Round 1: The 24 cyclists were seeded into 8 heats of 3 cyclists each. The winner of each heat advanced to the 1/8 finals (8 cyclists) while the other two cyclists went to the first repechage (16 cyclists).
- First repechage: The 16 cyclists were divided into 4 heats, each with 4 cyclists. The winner of each heat advanced to the 1/8 finals (4 cyclists), with all others eliminated (12 cyclists).
- 1/8 finals: The 12 remaining cyclists competed in a 1/8 finals round. There were 4 heats in this round, with 3 cyclists in each. The top cyclist in each heat advanced to the quarterfinals (4 cyclists), while the remaining two in each heat went to the second repechage (8 cyclists).
- Second repechage: This round featured 4 heats, with 2 cyclists each. The winner of each heat advanced to the quarterfinals (4 cyclists); the losers were eliminated (4 cyclists).
- Quarterfinals: Beginning with the quarterfinals, all matches were one-on-one competitions and were held in best-of-three format. There were 4 quarterfinals, with the winner of each advancing to the semifinals and the loser going to the fifth-eighth classification race.
- Semifinals: The two semifinals provided for advancement to the gold medal final for winners and to the bronze medal final for losers.
- Finals: Both a gold medal final and a bronze medal final were held, as well as a classification final for fifth through eighth places for quarterfinal losers.

== Records ==
The records for the sprint are 200 metre flying time trial records, kept for the qualifying round in later Games as well as for the finish of races.

World record	Michael Huebner (GDR)	10.118	Colorado Springs, United States	27 August 1986
Olympic record	Sergei Kopylov (URS)	10.47	Moscow, Soviet Union	26 July 1980

Lutz Heßlich set a new record with 10.395 seconds in the qualifying round.

== Schedule ==
All times are Korea Standard Time adjusted for daylight savings (UTC+10)

Date	Time	Round
Wednesday, 21 September 1988	10:00; 13:00; 15:55	Qualifying round Round 1 First repechage
Thursday, 22 September 1988	10:00; 11:40; 17:00	1/8 finals Second repechage Quarterfinals
Friday, 23 September 1988	20:10; 20:30	Semifinals; Classification 5–8
Saturday, 24 September 1988	17:15	Bronze medal match Final

== Results ==
=== Qualifying round ===
Rank	Cyclist	Nation	Time	Notes
1	Lutz Heßlich	East Germany	10.395	Q, OR
2	Gary Neiwand	Australia	10.563	Q
3	Nikolai Kovsh	Soviet Union	10.595	Q
4	Vratislav Šustr	Czechoslovakia	10.704	Q
5	Ken Carpenter	United States	10.792	Q
6	Fabrice Colas	France	10.857	Q
7	Frank Weber	West Germany	10.919	Q
8	Eddie Alexander	Great Britain	10.930	Q
9	José Manuel Moreno	Spain	10.931	Q
10	Erik Schoefs	Belgium	11.032	Q
11	Hideki Miwa	Japan	11.063	Q
12	Andrea Faccini	Italy	11.073	Q
13	Curt Harnett	Canada	11.144	Q
14	Maxwell Cheeseman	Trinidad and Tobago	11.171	Q
15	Gustavo Faris	Argentina	11.187	Q
16	Rosman Alwi	Malaysia	11.204	Q
17	Eom Yeong-seop	South Korea	11.222	Q
18	Mario Pons	Ecuador	11.339	Q
19	Lee Fu-hsiang	Chinese Taipei	11.475	Q
20	Paul Réneau	Belize	11.732	Q
21	Colin Abrams	Guyana	11.815	Q
22	Vincent Lynch	Barbados	11.845	Q
23	Michele Smith	Cayman Islands	12.055	Q
24	Bailón Becerra	Bolivia	12.216	Q
25	Ira Fabian	Antigua and Barbuda	12.817	

=== Round 1 ===
==== Heat 1 ====
Rank	Cyclist	Nation	Time 200 m	Notes
1	Lutz Heßlich	East Germany	11.25	Q
2	Eom Yeong-seop	South Korea		R
3	Rosman Alwi	Malaysia		R

==== Heat 2 ====
Rank	Cyclist	Nation	Time 200 m	Notes
1	Gary Neiwand	Australia	11.19	Q
2	Mario Pons	Ecuador		R
3	Gustavo Faris	Argentina		R

==== Heat 3 ====
Rank	Cyclist	Nation	Time 200 m	Notes
1	Nikolai Kovsh	Soviet Union	11.26	Q
2	Lee Fu-hsiang	Chinese Taipei		R
3	Maxwell Cheeseman	Trinidad and Tobago		R

==== Heat 4 ====
Rank	Cyclist	Nation	Time 200 m	Notes
1	Vratislav Šustr	Czechoslovakia	11.21	Q
2	Curt Harnett	Canada		R
3	Paul Réneau	Belize		R

==== Heat 5 ====
Rank	Cyclist	Nation	Time 200 m	Notes
1	Andrea Faccini	Italy	11,74	Q
2	Ken Carpenter	United States		R
3	Colin Abrams	Guyana		R

==== Heat 6 ====
Rank	Cyclist	Nation	Time 200 m	Notes
1	Fabrice Colas	France	10.77	Q
2	Hideki Miwa	Japan		R
3	Vincent Lynch	Barbados		R

==== Heat 7 ====
Rank	Cyclist	Nation	Time 200 m	Notes
1	Erik Schoefs	Belgium	11.34	Q
2	Frank Weber	West Germany		R
3	Michele Smith	Cayman Islands		R

==== Heat 8 ====
Rank	Cyclist	Nation	Time 200 m	Notes
1	Eddie Alexander	Great Britain	11.40	Q
2	José Manuel Moreno	Spain		R
3	Bailón Becerra	Bolivia		R

=== First repêchage ===
==== First repechage heat 1 ====
Rank	Cyclist	Nation	Time 200 m	Notes
1	Maxwell Cheeseman	Trinidad and Tobago	12.11	Q
2	Gustavo Faris	Argentina		
3	Eom Yeong-seop	South Korea		
4	José Manuel Moreno	Spain		

==== First repechage heat 2 ====
Rank	Cyclist	Nation	Time 200 m	Notes
1	Frank Weber	West Germany	11.55	Q
2	Mario Pons	Ecuador		
3	Bailón Becerra	Bolivia		
4	Colin Abrams	Guyana		

==== First repechage heat 3 ====
Rank	Cyclist	Nation	Time 200 m	Notes
1	Hideki Miwa	Japan	11.56	Q
2	Lee Fu-hsiang	Chinese Taipei		
3	Paul Réneau	Belize		
4	Michele Smith	Cayman Islands		

==== First repechage heat 4 ====
Rank	Cyclist	Nation	Time 200 m	Notes
1	Curt Harnett	Canada	11.26	Q
2	Ken Carpenter	United States		
3	Rosman Alwi	Malaysia		
4	Vincent Lynch	Barbados		

=== 1/8 finals ===
==== 1/8 final 1 ====
Rank	Cyclist	Nation	Time 200 m	Notes
1	Lutz Heßlich	East Germany	11.04	Q
2	Eddie Alexander	Great Britain		R
3	Hideki Miwa	Japan		R

==== 1/8 final 2 ====
Rank	Cyclist	Nation	Time 200 m	Notes
1	Erik Schoefs	Belgium	11.27	Q
2	Curt Harnett	Canada		R
3	Gary Neiwand	Australia		R

==== 1/8 final 3 ====
Rank	Cyclist	Nation	Time 200 m	Notes
1	Nikolai Kovsh	Soviet Union	11.10	Q
2	Fabrice Colas	France		R
3	Frank Weber	West Germany		R

==== 1/8 final 4 ====
Rank	Cyclist	Nation	Time 200 m	Notes
1	Vratislav Šustr	Czechoslovakia	11.13	Q
2	Maxwell Cheeseman	Trinidad and Tobago		R
3	Andrea Faccini	Italy		R

=== Second repêchage ===
==== Second repechage heat 1 ====
Rank	Cyclist	Nation	Time 200 m	Notes
1	Eddie Alexander	Great Britain	11.32	Q
2	Andrea Faccini	Italy		

==== Second repechage heat 2 ====
Rank	Cyclist	Nation	Time 200 m	Notes
1	Frank Weber	West Germany	11.39	Q
2	Curt Harnett	Canada		

==== Second repechage heat 3 ====
Rank	Cyclist	Nation	Time 200 m	Notes
1	Gary Neiwand	Australia	11.57	Q
2	Fabrice Colas	France		

==== Second repechage heat 4 ====
Rank	Cyclist	Nation	Time 200 m	Notes
1	Maxwell Cheeseman	Trinidad and Tobago	11.31	Q
2	Hideki Miwa	Japan		

=== Quarterfinals ===
==== Quarterfinal 1 ====
Rank	Cyclist	Nation	Race 1	Race 2	Race 3	Notes
1	Lutz Heßlich	East Germany	10.60	11.50	—N/a	Q
2	Frank Weber	West Germany			—N/a	C

==== Quarterfinal 2 ====
Rank	Cyclist	Nation	Race 1	Race 2	Race 3	Notes
1	Eddie Alexander	Great Britain		11.81	10.79	Q
2	Erik Schoefs	Belgium	10.96			C

==== Quarterfinal 3 ====
Rank	Cyclist	Nation	Race 1	Race 2	Race 3	Notes
1	Nikolai Kovsh	Soviet Union	11.77	11.05	—N/a	Q
2	Maxwell Cheeseman	Trinidad and Tobago			—N/a	C

==== Quarterfinal 4 ====
Rank	Cyclist	Nation	Race 1	Race 2	Race 3	Notes
1	Gary Neiwand	Australia	10.92	11.37	—N/a	Q
2	Vratislav Šustr	Czechoslovakia			—N/a	C

=== Semifinals ===
==== Semifinal 1 ====
Rank	Cyclist	Nation	Race 1	Race 2	Race 3	Notes
1	Lutz Heßlich	East Germany	11.12	10.64	—N/a	Q
2	Gary Neiwand	Australia			—N/a	B

==== Semifinal 2 ====
Rank	Cyclist	Nation	Race 1	Race 2	Race 3	Notes
1	Nikolai Kovsh	Soviet Union	11.09	11.90	—N/a	Q
2	Eddie Alexander	Great Britain			—N/a	B

=== Finals ===
==== Classification 5–8 ====
Rank	Cyclist	Nation	Time 200 m
5	Vratislav Šustr	Czechoslovakia	11.34
6	Erik Schoefs	Belgium	
7	Frank Weber	West Germany	
8	Maxwell Cheeseman	Trinidad and Tobago	

==== Bronze medal match ====
Rank	Cyclist	Nation	Race 1	Race 2	Race 3
3rd place, bronze medalist(s)	Gary Neiwand	Australia	10.97	10.88	—N/a
4	Eddie Alexander	Great Britain			—N/a

==== Final ====
Rank	Cyclist	Nation	Race 1	Race 2	Race 3
1st place, gold medalist(s)	Lutz Heßlich	East Germany	13.98	11.82	—N/a
2nd place, silver medalist(s)	Nikolai Kovsh	Soviet Union			—N/a
