= Cayman Islands at the 1988 Summer Olympics =

- Flag of the Cayman Islands
- IOC code: CAY
- NOC: Cayman Islands Olympic Committee

in Seoul
- Competitors: 8 (7 men and 1 woman) in 2 sports
- Flag bearer: Alfred Ebanks
- Medals: Gold 0 Silver 0 Bronze 0 Total 0

Summer Olympics appearances (overview)
- 1976; 1980; 1984; 1988; 1992; 1996; 2000; 2004; 2008; 2012; 2016; 2020; 2024

The Cayman Islands was represented at the 1988 Summer Olympics in Seoul, South Korea by the Cayman Islands Olympic Committee.

In total, eight athletes including seven men and one woman represented the Cayman Islands in two different sports including athletics and cycling.

== Competitors ==
In total, eight athletes represented the Cayman Islands at the 1988 Summer Olympics in Seoul, South Korea across two different sports.

Sport	Men	Women	Total
Athletics	1	1	2
Cycling	6	0	6
Total	7	1	8

== Athletics ==
In total, two Caymanian athletes participated in the athletics events – Paul Hurlston in the men's javelin throw and Michele Bush in the women's marathon.

The qualifying round for the men's javelin throw took place on 24 September 1988. Hurlston contested qualifying group B. His best throw of 62.34 m was not enough to advance to the final and he finished 37th overall.

Athlete	Event	Qualification		Final	
Athlete	Event	Distance	Position	Distance	Position
Paul Hurlston	Men's javelin throw	62.34	37	Did not advance	

The women's marathon took place on 23 September 1988. Bush completed the course in two hours 51 minutes 30 seconds to finish 52nd overall.

Athlete	Event	Final	
Athlete	Event	Time	Rank
Michele Bush	Women's marathon	2:51:30	52

== Cycling ==
In total, six Caymanian cycling participated in the athletics events – Nicholas Baker, Alfred Ebanks, Craig Merren, Perry Merren, Richard Pascal and Michele Smith.

The men's team time trial took place on 18 September 1988. The Cayman Islands completed the course in a combined time of two hours 19 minutes eight seconds to finish 27th overall.

The men's road race took place on 27 September 1988. Perry Merren completed the course in a time of four hours 32 minutes 56 seconds as he finished 58th overall. Pascal completed the course in a time of four hours 44 minutes 56 seconds as he finished 102nd overall. Smith did not finish.

Athlete	Event	Time	Rank
Perry Merren	Road race	4:32:56	58
Richard Pascal	Road race	4:44:56	102
Michele Smith	Road race	DNF	
Nicholas Baker; Alfred Ebanks; Craig Merren; Richard Pascal	Team time trial	2:19:08.0	27

The qualifying round of the men's sprint took place on 21 September 1988. Smith recorded a time of 12.055 seconds and was ranked 23rd. The first round took place later the same day. Smith finished third in his race and transferred to the repechage. The first round of the repechage took place later the same day. Smith finished fourth in his race and was eliminated from the competition.

Athlete	Event	Qualification		Round 1	Repechage 1	Round 2	Repechage 2	Quarterfinals	Semifinals	Final	
Athlete	Event	Time Speed (km/h)	Rank	Opposition Time Speed (km/h)	Opposition Time Speed (km/h)	Opposition Time Speed (km/h)	Opposition Time Speed (km/h)	Opposition Time Speed (km/h)	Opposition Time Speed (km/h)	Opposition Time Speed (km/h)	Rank
Michele Smith	Sprint	12.055	23 Q	Schoefs (BEL), Weber (FRG); L	Miwa (JPN), Lee (TPE), Réneau (BIZ); L	Did not advance					

The men's 1 km time trial took place on 20 September 1988. Smith completed the course in a time of one minute 11.820 seconds to finish 28th overall.

Athlete	Event	Time	Rank
Michele Smith	Time trial	1:11.820	28

The first round of the men's points race took place on 21 September 1999. Smith finished 15th in his race and was eliminated from the competition.

Athlete	Event	Qualification			Final		
Athlete	Event	Laps	Points	Rank	Laps	Points	Rank
Michele Smith	Points race	–1	1	15	Did not advance		

== See also ==
- Cayman Islands at the 1987 Pan American Games
