= Trinidad and Tobago at the 1992 Summer Olympics =

- IOC code: TTO (TRI used at these Games)
- NOC: Trinidad and Tobago Olympic Committee

in Barcelona
- Competitors: 7 men in 2 sports
- Flag bearer: Alvin Daniel
- Medals: Gold 0 Silver 0 Bronze 0 Total 0

Summer Olympics appearances (overview)
- 1948; 1952; 1956; 1960; 1964; 1968; 1972; 1976; 1980; 1984; 1988; 1992; 1996; 2000; 2004; 2008; 2012; 2016; 2020; 2024; 2028

Other related appearances
- British West Indies (1960 S)

Trinidad and Tobago was represented at the 1992 Summer Olympics in Barcelona, Catalonia, Spain by the Trinidad and Tobago Olympic Committee.

In total, seven athletes – all men – represented Trinidad and Tobago in two different sports including athletics and cycling.

Trinidad and Tobago didn't win any medals at the 1992 Summer Olympics but runner Ian Morris was 0.01 seconds away from the bronze medal in the men's 400 m.

== Competitors ==
In total, seven athletes represented Trinidad and Tobago at the 1992 Summer Olympics in Barcelona, Catalonia, Spain across two different sports.

Sport	Men	Women	Total
Athletics	5	0	5
Cycling	2	0	2
Total	7	0	7

== Athletics ==
In total, five Trinidadians and Tobagonians athletes participated in the athletics events – Ato Boldon, Alvin Daniel, Patrick Delice, Neil de Silva and Ian Morris.

The heats for the men's 100 m took place on 31 July 1992. Boldon finished fourth in his heat in a time of 10.77 seconds which was ultimately not fast enough advance to the quarter-finals.

The heats for the men's 400 m took place on 1 August 1992. Daniel finished second in his heat in a time of 46.09 seconds as he advanced to the quarter-finals. Delice finished fourth in his heat in a time of 46.58 seconds which was ultimately not fast enough to advance to the quarter-finals. Morris won in his heat in a time of 45.65 seconds as he also advanced to the quarter-finals. The quarter-finals took place on 2 August 1992. Daniel finished seventh in his quarter-final in a time of 46.44 seconds and he did not advance to the semi-finals. Morris won in his quarter-final in a time of 44.78 seconds as he advanced to the semi-finals. The semi-finals took place on 3 August 1992. Morris finished third in his semi-final in a time of 44.21 seconds as he advanced to the final. The final took place on 5 August 1992. Morris finished fourth in the final in a time of 44.25 seconds – 0.01 seconds behind the bronze medal winner.

The heats for the men's 200 m took place on 3 August 1992. Boldon finished fifth in his heat in a time of 21.65 seconds and he did not advance to the quarter-finals. De Silva finished second in his heat in a time of 20.89 seconds as he advanced to the quarter-finals. The quarter-finals took place later the same day. De Silva finished third in his quarter-final in a time of 20.66 seconds as he advanced to the semi-finals. The semi-finals took place on 5 August 1992. De Silva was disqualified from his semi-final.

The heats for the men's 4 x 400 m relay took place on 7 August 1992. Trinidad and Tobago won their heat in a time of three minutes 1.05 seconds as they advanced to the final. The final took place on 8 August 1992. Trinidad and Tobago finished seventh in the final in a time of three minutes 3.31 seconds.

Athlete	Event	Heat		Quarterfinal		Semifinal		Final	
Athlete	Event	Result	Rank	Result	Rank	Result	Rank	Result	Rank
Ato Boldon	Men's 100 m	10.77	44	Did not advance					
Ato Boldon	Men's 200 m	21.65	47	Did not advance					
Neil de Silva	Men's 200 m	20.89	11 Q	20.66	14 Q	DQ		Did not advance	
Alvin Daniel	Men's 400 m	46.09	23 Q	46.44	27	Did not advance			
Patrick Delice	Men's 400 m	46.58	37	Did not advance					
Ian Morris	Men's 400 m	45.65	10 Q	44.78	3 Q	44.21	3 Q	44.25	4
Alvin Daniel; Patrick Delice; Neil de Silva; Ian Morris	Men's 4 × 400 m relay	3:01.05	3 Q	—N/a				3:03.31	7

== Cycling ==
In total, two Trinidadians and Tobagonians athletes participated in the cycling events – Maxwell Cheeseman in the men's sprint and Gene Samuel in the men's 1 km time trial and the men's points race.

The men's 1 km time trial took place on 27 July 1992. Samuel completed the course in a time of one minute 5.485 seconds to finish eighth overall.

The qualifying round of the men's sprint took place on 28 July 1992. Cheeseman recorded a time of 11.448 seconds and was ranked 18th. The first round took place later the same day. Cheeseman finished third in his race and transferred to the repechage. The first round of the repechage took place later the same day. Cheeseman finished second in his race and was eliminated from the competition.

The first round of the men's points race took place on 28 July 1992. Samuel finished ninth in his race and advanced to the final. The final took place on 31 July 1992. Samuel accumulated a total of four points and finished 19th overall.

=== Track ===
Sprint

Athlete	Event	Qualification		Round 1	Repechage		Round 2	Repechage 2	Quarterfinals	Semifinals	Final	
Athlete	Event	Qualification		Round 1	Round 1	Round 2	Round 2	Repechage 2	Quarterfinals	Semifinals	Final	
Athlete	Event	Time Speed (km/h)	Rank	Opposition Time Speed (km/h)	Opposition Time Speed (km/h)	Opposition Time Speed (km/h)	Opposition Time Speed (km/h)	Opposition Time Speed (km/h)	Opposition Time Speed (km/h)	Opposition Time Speed (km/h)	Opposition Time Speed (km/h)	Rank
Maxwell Cheeseman	Men's sprint	11.448; 62.893	18	Harnett (CAN), Kovsh (EUN); L	Chiappa (ITA); L	Did not advance						

Time trial

Athlete	Event	Time	Rank
Gene Samuel	Men's time trial	1:05.485	8

Points race

Athlete	Event	Qualification			Final		
Athlete	Event	Laps	Points	Rank	Laps	Points	Rank
Gene Samuel	Men's points race	−1 lap	17	9 Q	0 laps	4	19

== See also ==
- Trinidad and Tobago at the 1991 Pan American Games
