= Trinidad and Tobago at the 1988 Summer Olympics =

- IOC code: TTO (TRI used at these Games)
- NOC: Trinidad and Tobago Olympic Committee
- Website: www.ttoc.org

in Seoul
- Competitors: 6 in 3 sports
- Flag bearer: Ian Morris
- Medals: Gold 0 Silver 0 Bronze 0 Total 0

Summer Olympics appearances (overview)
- 1948; 1952; 1956; 1960; 1964; 1968; 1972; 1976; 1980; 1984; 1988; 1992; 1996; 2000; 2004; 2008; 2012; 2016; 2020; 2024

Other related appearances
- British West Indies (1960 S)

Six athletes from Trinidad and Tobago competed at the 1988 Summer Olympics in Seoul, South Korea. Three track and field athletes, two cyclists and one swimmer represented the Caribbean nation.

== Competitors ==
The following is the list of number of competitors in the Games.

Sport	Men	Women	Total
Athletics	2	1	3
Cycling	2	0	2
Swimming	0	1	1
Total	4	2	6

== Athletics ==
- Patrick Delice
- Ian Morris
- Angela Williams

== Cycling ==
Two cyclists represented Trinidad and Tobago in 1988.

Men's sprint

- Maxwell Cheeseman

Men's 1 km time trial

- Gene Samuel

Men's points race

- Gene Samuel

== Swimming ==
Women's 50m Freestyle

- Karen Dieffenthaler
  1. Heat – 27.27 (→ did not advance, 28th place)

Women's 100m Freestyle

- Karen Dieffenthaler
  1. Heat – 58.64 (→ did not advance, 35th place)

Women's 200m Freestyle

- Karen Dieffenthaler
  1. Heat – 2:07.09 (→ did not advance, 31st place)
