= Trinidad and Tobago at the Olympics =

- IOC code: TTO
- NOC: Trinidad and Tobago Olympic Committee
- Website: www.ttoc.org
- Medals Ranked 83rd: Gold 3 Silver 5 Bronze 11 Total 19

Summer appearances
- 1948; 1952; 1956; 1960; 1964; 1968; 1972; 1976; 1980; 1984; 1988; 1992; 1996; 2000; 2004; 2008; 2012; 2016; 2020; 2024; 2028

Winter appearances
- 1994; 1998; 2002; 2006–2018; 2022; 2026

Other related appearances
- British West Indies (1960 S)

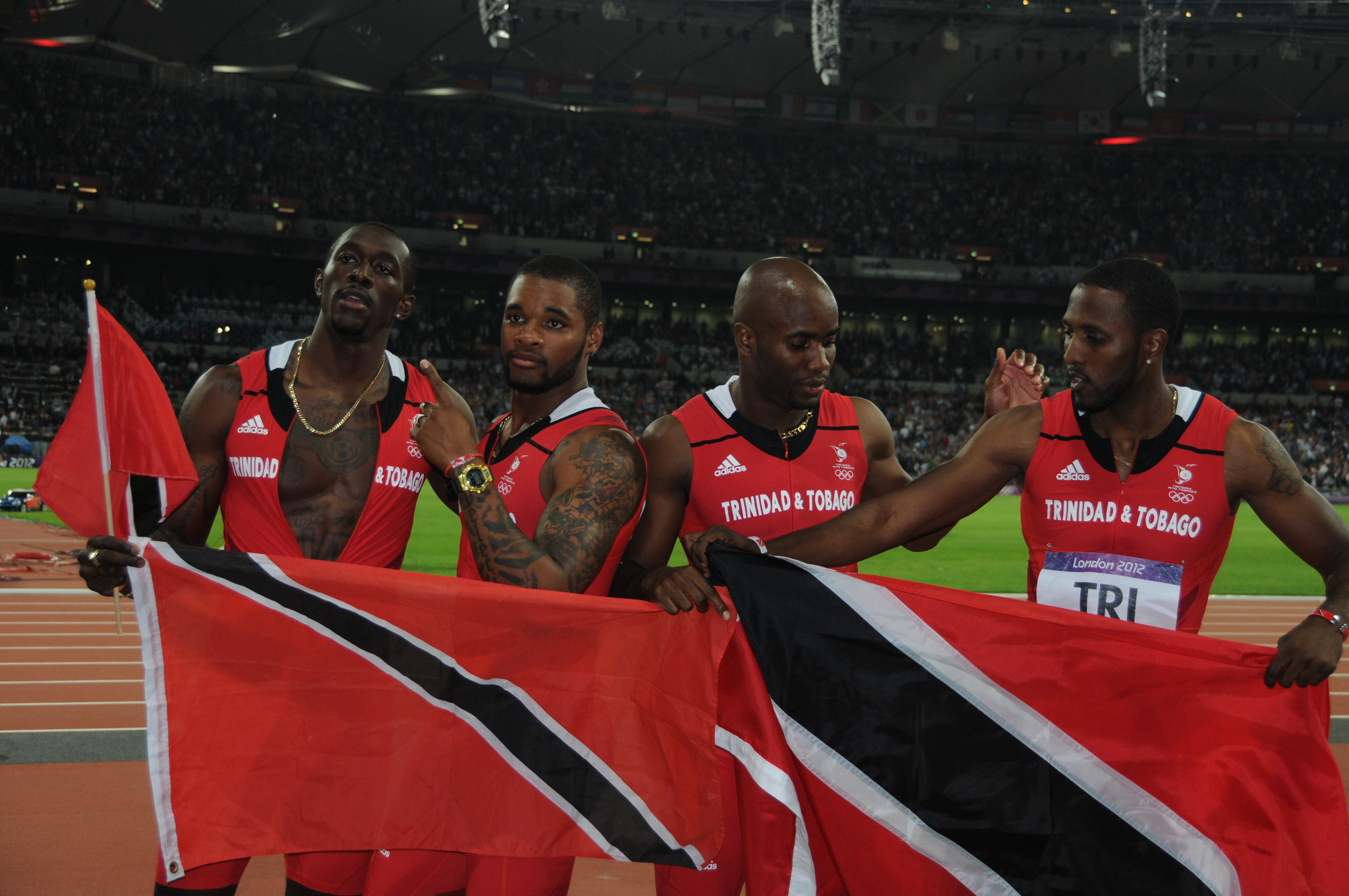
Trinidad and Tobago won bronze in the Men's 4x400 relay at the 2012 London Olympics

Trinidad and Tobago first participated in the Summer Olympic Games in 1948, before they attained their independence from Great Britain. Despite being a small nation in the Caribbean, Trinidad and Tobago has been able to place themselves firmly in international sports. In 1946, Sir Lennox O’Reilly organized the nation’s first Olympic committee. Trinidad and Tobago have participated in 19 Summer games and 5 Winter Olympic Games (as well as 5 Summer Paralympics).

== Timeline of participation ==
Olympic Year/s	Teams		
1948–1956	Jamaica	Trinidad and Tobago	
1960	British West Indies		
1964	Jamaica	Trinidad and Tobago	
1968–present	Jamaica	Trinidad and Tobago	Barbados

== Medal tables ==
=== Medals by Summer Games ===
Games	Athletes	Gold	Silver	Bronze	Total	Rank
1948 London	5	0	1	0	1	28
1952 Helsinki	2	0	0	2	2	37
1956 Melbourne	6	0	0	0	0	–
1960 Rome	as part of the British West Indies					
1964 Tokyo	13	0	1	2	3	28
1968 Mexico City	19	0	0	0	0	–
1972 Munich	19	0	0	0	0	–
1976 Montreal	13	1	0	0	1	26
1980 Moscow	10	0	0	0	0	–
1984 Los Angeles	16	0	0	0	0	–
1988 Seoul	6	0	0	0	0	–
1992 Barcelona	7	0	0	0	0	–
1996 Atlanta	12	0	0	2	2	68
2000 Sydney	19	0	1	1	2	61
2004 Athens	19	0	0	1	1	71
2008 Beijing	28	1	1	0	2	47
2012 London	30	1	1	2	4	47
2016 Rio de Janeiro	30	0	0	1	1	78
2020 Tokyo	23	0	0	0	0	–
2024 Paris	18	0	0	0	0	–
2028 Los Angeles	future event					
2032 Brisbane	future event					
Total		3	5	11	19	83

=== Medals by Winter Games ===
Games	Athletes	Gold	Silver	Bronze	Total	Rank
1994 Lillehammer	2	0	0	0	0	–
1998 Nagano	2	0	0	0	0	–
2002 Salt Lake City	3	0	0	0	0	–
2006-2018	did not participate					
2022 Beijing	2	0	0	0	0	–
2026 Milano Cortina	6	0	0	0	0	–
2030 French Alps	future event					
2034 Utah	future event					
Total		0	0	0	0	–

=== Medals by summer sport ===
Sport	Gold	Silver	Bronze	Total
Athletics	3	4	8	15
Weightlifting	0	1	2	3
Swimming	0	0	1	1
Totals (3 entries)	3	5	11	19

== List of medalists ==
Medal	Name	Games	Sport	Event
Silver	Rodney Wilkes	1948 London	Weightlifting	Men's featherweight
Bronze	Rodney Wilkes	1952 Helsinki	Weightlifting	Men's featherweight
Bronze	Lennox Kilgour	1952 Helsinki	Weightlifting	Men's middle-heavyweight
Silver	Wendell Mottley	1964 Tokyo	Athletics	Men's 400 metres
Bronze	Edwin Roberts	1964 Tokyo	Athletics	Men's 200 metres
Bronze	Wendell Mottley; Kent Bernard; Edwin Roberts; Edwin Skinner	1964 Tokyo	Athletics	Men's 4 x 400 metres relay
Gold	Hasely Crawford	1976 Montreal	Athletics	Men's 100 metres
Bronze	Ato Boldon	1996 Atlanta	Athletics	Men's 100 metres
Bronze	Ato Boldon	1996 Atlanta	Athletics	Men's 200 metres
Silver	Ato Boldon	2000 Sydney	Athletics	Men's 100 metres
Bronze	Ato Boldon	2000 Sydney	Athletics	Men's 200 metres
Bronze	George Bovell	2004 Athens	Swimming	Men's 200 metre individual medley
Gold	Keston Bledman; Marc Burns; Emmanuel Callender; Richard Thompson; Aaron Armstrong	2008 Beijing	Athletics	Men's 4 × 100 metres relay
Silver	Richard Thompson	2008 Beijing	Athletics	Men's 100 metres
Gold	Keshorn Walcott	2012 London	Athletics	Men's javelin throw
Silver	Marc Burns; Keston Bledman; Emmanuel Callender; Richard Thompson	2012 London	Athletics	Men's 4 × 100 metres relay
Bronze	Lalonde Gordon	2012 London	Athletics	Men's 400 metres
Bronze	Lalonde Gordon; Jarrin Solomon; Renny Quow; Deon Lendore; Machel Cedenio; Ade Alleyne-Forte	2012 London	Athletics	Men's 4 × 400 metres relay
Bronze	Keshorn Walcott	2016 Rio de Janeiro	Athletics	Men's javelin throw

== 1948 Summer Olympics ==
The Games of the XIV Olympiad were held in 1948 in London, United Kingdom. This was the first time Trinidad & Tobago was represented in the Olympics. The Trinidad & Tobago Olympic Committee sent nine athletes and officials to represent the nation in three disciplines.

Errol Knowles was the Chef de Mission

=== Athletics ===
Three athletes and one official represented this discipline.

- George Lewis 100 m & 200 m
- Manny Ramjohn 500 m & 1000 m
- Wilfred Tull 800 m & 1500 m
- A.E. Browne Manager/Coach

Trinidad & Tobago did not win any medals in 1948 for this discipline.

=== Cycling ===
One athlete and one official represented this discipline.

- Compton Gonsalves — Kilometer Time Trial
- Laurie Rogers — Manager/Coach

Trinidad & Tobago did not win any medals in 1948 for this discipline.

Compton Gonsalves placed 17th in the kilometer time trial with a time of 1 minute and 32 seconds.

=== Weightlifting ===
	Gold	Silver	Bronze	Total
Trinidad and Tobago	0	1	0	1

One athlete and one official represented this discipline.

- Rodney Wilkes — Featherweight
- Lionel Seemungal — Manager/Coach

Rodney Wilkes won the first medal for Trinidad and Tobago lifting 317.5 kilograms in three lifts.

== 1952 Summer Olympics ==
The Games of the XV Olympiad were held in 1952 in Helsinki, Finland. This was the second time Trinidad & Tobago was represented in the Olympics. The Trinidad & Tobago Olympic Committee sent four athletes and officials to represent the nation in one discipline.

Errol Knowles was the Chef de Mission

Two athletes and one official represented this discipline.

- Rodney Wilkes — Featherweight
- Lennox Kilgour — Middle Heavy
- Freddy Mendes — Coach

Both athletes won medals for Trinidad & Tobago. Rodney Wilkes lift 322.5 kilograms and Lennox Kilgour lift 402.5 kilograms.

== 1956 Summer Olympics ==
The Games of the XVI Olympiad were held in 1956 in Melbourne, Australia. This was the third time Trinidad & Tobago was represented in the Olympics. The Trinidad & Tobago Olympic Committee sent eight athletes and officials to represent the nation in one discipline.

Dr. Roderick Marcano was the Chef de Mission.

=== Athletics ===
Three athletes represented this discipline.

- Mike Agostini — 100 m & 200 m
- Joseph Goddard — 100 m & 200 m
- Edmund Turton

Michael Agostini placed 6th in the 100 m and 4th in the 200 m.

=== Cycling ===
One athlete represented this discipline.

- Hilton Mitchell — Match Sprint & Kilo Time Trial

=== Weightlifting ===
Two athletes and one official represented this discipline.

- Lennox Kilgour — Middle Heavy
- Rodney Wilkes — Featherweight
- Alexander Chapman — Coach

Lennox Kilgour placed 6th. Rodney Wilkes placed 4th lifting 330 kilograms.

== 1960 Summer Olympics ==
The Games of the XVII Olympiad were held in 1960 in Rome, Italy.

In 1958 the British West Indies joined together politically to become a Confederation. Because of this, a unified West Indian Team was entered in the Olympics. Trinidad and Tobago however contributed four athletes to the team.

- Clifton Bertrand — Athletics
- Clyde Rimple — Cycling
- Richard Bennett — Sailing
- David Farfan — Sailing

The British West Indies won two bronze medals, none of which were attributed to Trinidad & Tobago.

== 1964 Summer Olympics ==
The Games of the XVIII Olympiad were held in 1964 in Tokyo, Japan. This was the fourth time Trinidad & Tobago was represented in the Olympics. The Trinidad & Tobago Olympic Committee sent twenty athletes and officials to represent the nation in four disciplines.

Knolly Henderson was the Chef de Mission.

=== Athletics ===
	Gold	Silver	Bronze	Total
Trinidad and Tobago	0	1	2	3

Seven athletes and two official represented this discipline.

- Kent Bernard — 4 × 400 m relay
- Clifton Bertrand
- Wilton Jackson
- Wendell Mottley — 400 m & 4 × 400 m relay
- Edwin Roberts — 200 m & 4 × 400 m relay
- Edwin Skinner — 4 × 400 m relay
- E. McDonald Bailey — Coach
- Broderick Lynch — Manager

Edwin Roberts won bronze in the 200 m in 20.3 seconds. The men’s relay team also won bronze. Wendell Mottley won silver for the 400 m in 45.2 seconds.

=== Cycling ===
Three athletes and two official represented this discipline.

- Ronald Cassidy — Track
- Roger Gibbon — Track
- Fitzroy Hoyte — Track
- Gordon Carew — Coach
- Compton Gonsalves — Mechanic

=== Sailing ===
Two athletes and one official represented this discipline.

- Cordell Barrow — Flying Dutchman
- Rawle Barrow — Flying Dutchman
- Bob Levorsen — Coach

The sailing team placed 20th.

=== Weightlifting ===
Two athletes and one official represented this discipline.

- Brandon Bailey — Heavyweight
- Hugo Gittens — Lightweight
- Alexander Chapman — Coach

Hugo Gittens placed 11th in the lightweight class with 367.5 kg (810 lb). Brandon Bailey placed 20th in the heavyweight division.

== See also ==
- List of flag bearers for Trinidad and Tobago at the Olympics
- Trinidad and Tobago at the Paralympics
- Tropical nations at the Winter Olympics
