= Trinidad and Tobago at the 1968 Summer Olympics =

- IOC code: TTO (TRT used at these Games)
- NOC: Trinidad and Tobago Olympic Committee

in Mexico City
- Competitors: 19 in 5 sports
- Flag bearer: Roger Gibbon
- Medals: Gold 0 Silver 0 Bronze 0 Total 0

Summer Olympics appearances (overview)
- 1948; 1952; 1956; 1960; 1964; 1968; 1972; 1976; 1980; 1984; 1988; 1992; 1996; 2000; 2004; 2008; 2012; 2016; 2020; 2024; 2028

Other related appearances
- British West Indies (1960 S)

Trinidad and Tobago competed at the 1968 Summer Olympics in Mexico City, Mexico. 19 competitors, all men, took part in 14 events in 5 sports.

== Athletics ==
Men's 100 metres

- Ronald Monsegue

- Round 1 — 10.5 seconds (→ 5th in heat, did not advance)

Men's 200 metres

- Edwin Roberts

- Round 1 — 20.6 seconds (→ 4th in heat, advanced to round 2)
- Round 2 — 20.4 seconds (→ 2nd in heat, advanced to semi final)
- Semi final — 20.4 seconds (→ 2nd in heat, advanced to final)
- Final — 20.3 seconds (→ 4th place)

- Winston Short

- Round 1 — 20.9 seconds (→ 2nd in heat, advanced to round 2)
- Round 2 — 21.5 seconds (→ 7th in heat, did not advance)

Men's 400 metres

- George Simon

- Round 1 — 47.9 seconds (→ 5th in heat, did not advance)

Men's 800 metres

- Benedict Cayenne

- Heats — 1:48.2 min (→ 2nd in heat, advanced to semi final)
- Semi final — 1:46.8 min (→ 4th in heat, advanced to final)
- Final — 1:54.3 min (→ 8th place)

Men's 4x100 metres relay

- Raymond Fabien, Winston Short, Carl Archer, Edwin Roberts

- Heats — 38.9 seconds (→ 6th in heat, advanced to semi final)
- Semi final — 39.5 seconds (→ 6th in heat, did not advance)

Men's 4x400 metres relay

- George Simon, Euric Bobb, Benedict Cayenne, Edwin Roberts

- Heats — 3:04.5 min (→ 2nd in heat, advanced to semi final)
- Semi final — 39.5 seconds (→ 6th in heat, did not advance)
- Final — 3:04.5 min (→ 6th place)

== Cycling ==
Men's 1.000m Time Trial

- Roger Gibbon — 1:04.66 min (→ 5th place)

Men's Sprint

- Roger Gibbon

- Round 1 — 1st in heat (→ advanced to round 2)
- Round 2 — 1st in heat (→ advanced to round 2)
- Round of 16 — 2nd in heat (→ advanced to repechage)
- Repechage — 2nd in heat (→ did not advance)

- Leslie King

- Round 1 — 2nd in heat (→ advanced to repechage)
- Repechage — 1st in heat (→ advanced to round 2)
- Round 2 — 3rd in heat (→ advanced to repechage)
- Repechage — 1st in heat (→ advanced to round of 16)
- Round of 16 — 2nd in heat (→ advanced to repechage)
- Repechage — 3rd in heat (→ did not advance)

Men's Individual Pursuit

- Vernon Stauble

- Qualification — 5:07.80 min (→ 19th in trial, did not advance)

Men's Team Pursuit

- Robert Farrell, Salim Mohammed, Phillip Richardson, Noel Luces

- Qualification — 4:48.64 min (→ did not advance)

== Shooting ==
Two male shooters represented Trinidad and Tobago in 1968.

50 m pistol

- Bertram Manhin — 539 pts (→ 38th place)

50 m rifle, prone

- Hugh Homer — 583 pts (→ 65th place)

== Swimming ==
Men's 100 metres freestyle

- Geoffrey Ferreira

- Heats — 58.9 s (→ 5th in heat, did not advance)

Men's 100 metres backstroke

- Geoffrey Ferreira

- Heats — DNS (→ no ranking)

Men's 100 metres butterfly

- Geoffrey Ferreira

- Heats — DNS (→ no ranking)

== Weightlifting ==
Lightweight

- Hugo Gittens

- Press — 120.0 kg
- Snatch — 102.5 kg
- Jerk — 137.5 kg
- Total — 360.0 kg (→ 16th place)
