= Merren =

Merren is a surname. Notable people with the surname include:

- Craig Merren (born 1966), Caymanian cyclist
- Perry Merren (born 1969), Caymanian cyclist
- Tyler Merren (born 1984), American goalball player

== See also ==
- Mirren
