= Trinidad and Tobago at the 1984 Summer Olympics =

- IOC code: TTO (TRI used at these Games)
- NOC: Trinidad and Tobago Olympic Committee

in Los Angeles
- Competitors: 16 (11 men, 5 women) in 5 sports
- Flag bearer: Hasely Crawford
- Medals: Gold 0 Silver 0 Bronze 0 Total 0

Summer Olympics appearances (overview)
- 1948; 1952; 1956; 1960; 1964; 1968; 1972; 1976; 1980; 1984; 1988; 1992; 1996; 2000; 2004; 2008; 2012; 2016; 2020; 2024; 2028

Other related appearances
- British West Indies (1960 S)

Trinidad and Tobago competed at the 1984 Summer Olympics in Los Angeles, United States. Sixteen competitors, eleven men and five women, took part in fourteen events in five sports.

== Athletics ==
Men's 100 metres

- Hasely Crawford

- Heat — 10.48q (Heat 1, 4th place)
- Quarterfinals — 10.56 (QF 1, 4th place→ did not advance)

Men's 400 metres

- Michael Paul

- Heat — 46.18
- Quarterfinals — 45.84
- Semifinals — 45.60 (→ did not advance)

- Anton Skerritt

- Heat — 46.30
- Quarterfinals — 46.93 (→ did not advance)

- Ali St. Louis

- Heat — did not finish (→ did not advance)

Men's 4×400 metres Relay

- Anton Skerritt, Michael Puckerin, Derek Archer, and Michael Paul

Women's 100 metres

- Gillian Forde
- Angela Williams

Women's 200 metres

- Angela Williams

Women's 400 metres

- Gail Emmanuel

Women's 4×100 metres Relay

- Janice Bernard, Gillian Forde, Esther Hope-Washington, and Angela Williams

== Boxing ==
Men's Featherweight

- Nirmal Lorick

Men's Light-Heavyweight

- Don Smith

== Cycling ==
One cyclist represented Trinidad and Tobago in 1984.

Sprint

- Gene Samuel

1000m time trial

- Gene Samuel

== Sailing ==
Mixed One Person Dinghy

- Jean-Marc Holder

== Swimming ==
Men's 100m Breaststroke

- Paul Newallo

- Heat — 1:06.12 (→ did not advance, 28th place)

Men's 200m Breaststroke

- Paul Newallo

- Heat — 2:28.88 (→ did not advance, 32nd place)
