= Trinidad and Tobago at the 1996 Summer Olympics =

- IOC code: TTO (TRI used at these Games)
- NOC: Trinidad and Tobago Olympic Committee
- Website: www.ttoc.org

in Atlanta
- Competitors: 12 (8 men and 4 women) in 6 sports
- Flag bearer: Gene Samuel
- Medals Ranked 68th: Gold 0 Silver 0 Bronze 2 Total 2

Summer Olympics appearances (overview)
- 1948; 1952; 1956; 1960; 1964; 1968; 1972; 1976; 1980; 1984; 1988; 1992; 1996; 2000; 2004; 2008; 2012; 2016; 2020; 2024; 2028

Other related appearances
- British West Indies (1960 S)

Trinidad and Tobago competed at the 1996 Summer Olympics in Atlanta, United States.

== Medalists ==
Medal	Name	Sport	Event	Date
Bronze	Ato Boldon	Athletics	Men's 100 metres	27 July
Bronze	Ato Boldon	Athletics	Men's 200 metres	1 August

== Competitors ==
The following is the list of number of competitors in the Games.

Sport	Men	Women	Total
Athletics	5	1	6
Badminton	0	1	1
Boxing	1	–	1
Cycling	1	0	1
Swimming	0	2	2
Table tennis	1	0	1
Total	8	4	12

== Athletics ==
Men
Track and road events

Athlete	Event	Heats		Quarterfinal		Semifinal		Final	
Athlete	Event	Result	Rank	Result	Rank	Result	Rank	Result	Rank
Ato Boldon	100 metres	10.06	2 Q	9.95	2 Q	9.93	1 Q	9.90	3rd place, bronze medalist(s)
Ato Boldon	200 metres	20.26	1 Q	20.25	1 Q	20.05	2 Q	19.80	3rd place, bronze medalist(s)
Neil de Silva	200 metres	20.54	9 Q	20.62	16 Q	21.26	16	Did not advance	
Neil de Silva	400 metres	45.34	6 Q	45.02	9 Q	45.56	13	Did not advance	
Robert Guy	400 metres	46.80	43	Did not advance					
Ronnie Holassie	Marathon	—N/a						2:27:20	75

Field events

Athlete	Event	Qualification		Final	
Athlete	Event	Distance	Position	Distance	Position
Kirt Thompson	Javelin throw	68.02	33	Did not advance	

Women
Field events

Athlete	Event	Qualification		Final	
Athlete	Event	Distance	Position	Distance	Position
Natasha Alleyne	High jump	1.85	26	Did not advance	

== Badminton ==
Women

Athlete	Event	Round of 64	Round of 32	Round of 16	Quarterfinals	Semifinals	Final	
Athlete	Event	Opposition Result	Opposition Result	Opposition Result	Opposition Result	Opposition Result	Opposition Result	Rank
Debra O'Connor	Singles	Julien (CAN); L 3–11, 0–11	Did not advance					

== Boxing ==
Athlete	Event	Round of 32	Round of 16	Quarterfinals	Semifinals	Final	
Athlete	Event	Opposition Result	Opposition Result	Opposition Result	Opposition Result	Opposition Result	Rank
Kurt Sinette	Light middleweight	Woldemichael (ETH); L 10–11	Did not advance				

== Cycling ==
=== Track ===
Time trial

Athlete	Event	Time	Rank
Gene Samuel	Time trial	1:05.533	10

== Swimming ==
Women

Athlete	Event	Heats		Final A/B	
Athlete	Event	Time	Rank	Time	Rank
Siobhan Cropper	50 m freestyle	26.29	19	Did not advance	
Siobhan Cropper	100 m freestyle	57.30	26	Did not advance	
Cerian Gibbes	100 m breaststroke	1:16.99	44	Did not advance	
Cerian Gibbes	200 m breaststroke	2:45.87	39	Did not advance	

== Table tennis ==
Men

Athlete	Event	Group Stage				Round of 16	Quarterfinal	Semifinal	Final	
Athlete	Event	Opposition Result	Opposition Result	Opposition Result	Rank	Opposition Result	Opposition Result	Opposition Result	Opposition Result	Rank
Dexter St. Louis	Singles	Hoyama (BRA); L 0–2	Persson (SWE); L 0–2	Kim (PRK); L 0–2	4	Did not advance				

== See also ==
- Trinidad and Tobago at the 1995 Pan American Games
