= Cayman Islands at the 1976 Summer Olympics =

- Flag of the Cayman Islands
- IOC code: CAY
- NOC: Cayman Islands Olympic Committee

in Montreal, Canada
- Competitors: 2 (2 men and 0 women) in 1 sport
- Medals: Gold 0 Silver 0 Bronze 0 Total 0

Summer Olympics appearances (overview)
- 1976; 1980; 1984; 1988; 1992; 1996; 2000; 2004; 2008; 2012; 2016; 2020; 2024

The Cayman Islands competed at the 1976 Summer Olympics, which were held from 17 July to 1 August 1976 in Montreal, Canada. The country's participation in Montreal marked its first appearance at the Summer Olympics, with its National Olympic Committee being recognized in the same year. The athlete delegation of the Cayman Islands included two athletes: sailors Gerry Kirkconnell and Peter Milburn.

From 19 to 27 July, the pair competed in the 470 event. They had placed last in the event, and did not medal. Thus, Cayman Islands has yet to win an Olympic medal.

== Background ==
The 1976 Summer Olympics were held from 17 July to 1 August 1976 in Montreal, Canada. The territory's appearance at the Games was its first ever appearance at the Summer Olympics, with the Cayman Islands Olympic Committee only being recognized by the International Olympic Committee the same year. Besides sailing, the Cayman Islands Olympic Committee tried to qualify athletes in basketball, football, shooting, and volleyball.

== Sailing ==
The sailing events were held at the Portsmouth Olympic Harbour. Sailors Gerry Kirkconnell and Peter Milburn were selected to be the first Olympians for the territory as there were no time-related qualification standards needed to be met. They had never competed in international competition prior to their appearance at these games.

They competed in the 470 from 19 to 27 July. They had accumulated net points amounting to 176.0 and finished last with a total point score of 213.0. The pair had placed last out of 28 competing pairs.

Sailing summary
Rank	Helmsman (Country)	Crew	Race I		Race II		Race III		Race IV		Race V		Race VI		Race VII		Total Points (Note: The 1976 Olympic scoring system was used.)	Total -1 (Note: Total after applying discard.)
Rank	Helmsman (Country)	Crew	Rank	Points	Rank	Points	Rank	Points	Rank	Points	Rank	Points	Rank	Points	Rank	Points	Total Points	Total -1
28	Gerry Kirkconnell (CAY)	Peter Milburn	28	34.0	23	29.0	18	24.0	~~PMS~~	~~37.0~~	18	24.0	25	31.0	DNF	34.0	213.0	176.0
