= Trinidad and Tobago at the 1964 Summer Olympics =

- IOC code: TTO (TRT used at these Games)
- NOC: Trinidad and Tobago Olympic Committee

in Tokyo
- Competitors: 13 in 4 sports
- Flag bearer: Wendell Mottley
- Medals Ranked 28th: Gold 0 Silver 1 Bronze 2 Total 3

Summer Olympics appearances (overview)
- 1948; 1952; 1956; 1960; 1964; 1968; 1972; 1976; 1980; 1984; 1988; 1992; 1996; 2000; 2004; 2008; 2012; 2016; 2020; 2024; 2028

Other related appearances
- British West Indies (1960 S)

Athletes from Trinidad and Tobago competed at the 1964 Summer Olympics in Tokyo, Japan. This marked the return of Trinidad and Tobago to the Olympic Games as a separate nation, after having competed as part of the British West Indies at the 1960 Summer Olympics. Thirteen competitors, all men, took part in ten events in four sports.

== Medalists ==
=== Silver ===
- Wendell Mottley – Athletics, Men's 400 metres

=== Bronze ===
- Edwin Roberts – Athletics, Men's 200 metres
- Edwin Skinner, Kent Bernard, Wendell Mottley, and Edwin Roberts – Athletics, Men's 4x400 metres

== Cycling ==
Three cyclists represented Trinidad and Tobago in 1964.

Sprint

- Roger Gibbon
- Fitzroy Hoyte

1000m time trial

- Roger Gibbon

Individual pursuit

- Ronald Cassidy
