= Marisa Dick =

Trinidadian artistic gymnast (born 1997)

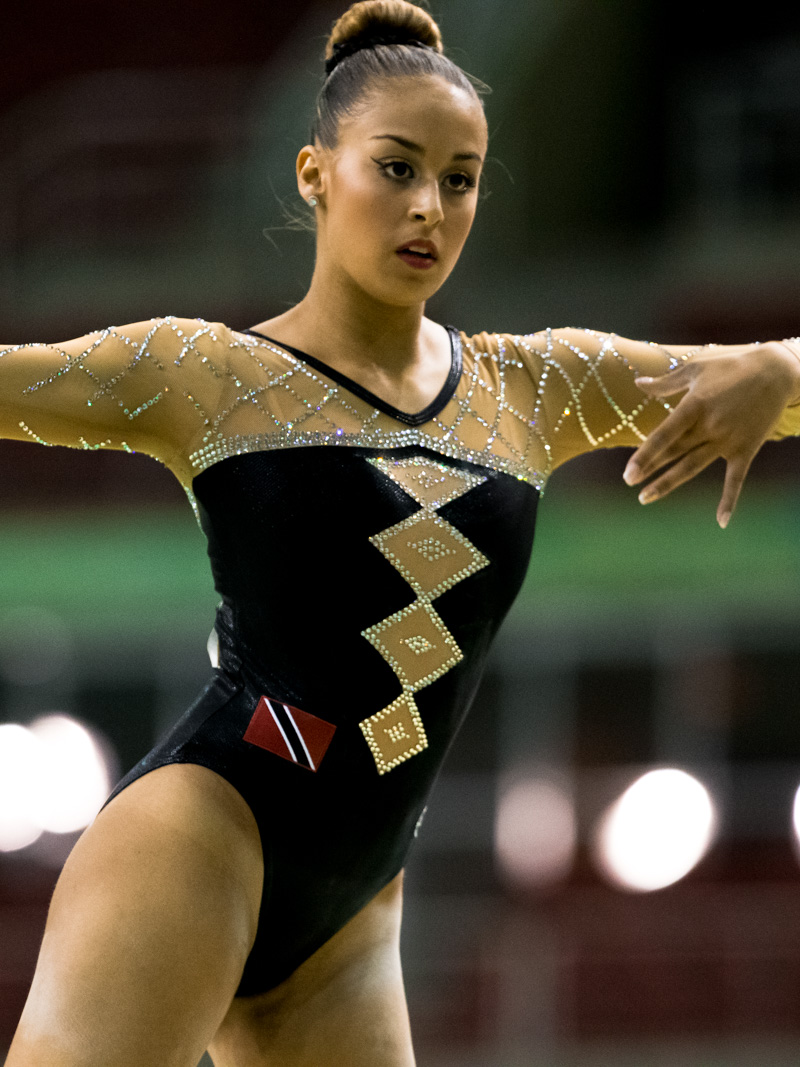
- Dick competing at the 2016 Olympic Test Event

Personal information
- Full name: Marisa Roseanne Dick
- Born: 26 May 1997 (age 29) Kamloops, British Columbia, Canada
- Height: 1.53 m (5 ft 0 in)

Gymnastics career
- Discipline: Women's artistic gymnastics
- Country represented: Trinidad and Tobago; (2013–2016)
- Club: Capital City Gymnastics Centre (CAN)
- Head coach: Anita Pelletier

Marisa Roseanne Dick (born 26 May 1997) is a Canadian-born former artistic gymnast who represented Trinidad and Tobago in international competitions. She became Trinidad and Tobago's first Olympian in gymnastics when she competed at the 2016 Summer Olympics. Additionally, she competed at the 2013 and 2015 World Championships. She is the originator of two balance beam mounts that are named after her in the Code of Points.

== Early life ==
Dick was born in Kamloops, British Columbia, to a Trinidadian mother. She graduated from Paul Kane High School in St. Albert, Alberta. She trained in gymnastics at the Capital City Gymnastics Centre in Edmonton.

== Gymnastics career ==
=== 2013–2015 ===
Dick began competing internationally for Trinidad and Tobago, her mother's native country, in 2013. She competed at the 2013 Pan American Championships but did not advance into any of the event finals. She then competed at the 2013 World Championships in Antwerp, Belgium, and finished 50th in the all-around qualifications. She did not advance into any individual finals.

At the 2014 Commonwealth Gymnastics Invitational, she won the uneven bars gold medal, the balance beam silver medal, and the vault and all-around bronze medals. She tore her Achilles tendon while competing on the floor exercise at the 2014 Pan American Championships. She had to withdraw from the rest of the season, including the 2014 Central American and Caribbean Games and the 2014 World Championships. She returned to training six months later and competed as a guest at the 2015 Canadian Championships.

Dick returned to international competition at the 2015 Pan American Games and advanced to the all-around final in 20th place. She improved her result to finish 14th in the final. She then competed at the 2015 World Championships in Glasgow despite dislocating a rib the day before the event. She finished 77th in the all-around qualifications with a score of 51.499. At that competition, she performed the switch leap balance beam mount for the first time, and as the first gymnast to complete the mount in international competition, it was named after her in the Code of Points.

=== 2016 ===
Dick began the 2016 season at the WOGA Classic in Frisco, Texas, and finished fifth in the all-around. She then placed tenth in the all-around at the International Gymnix in Montreal. She advanced into the vault and uneven bars event finals and finished fifth in both. She competed as a guest at the Canadian Championships and finished 19th in the all-around.

Because teammate Thema Williams placed higher than her in the all-around at the 2015 World Championships, the Trinidad and Tobago Gymnastics Federation (TTGF) awarded Williams the berth to the 2016 Olympic Test Event—the final qualifier for the 2016 Summer Olympics—based on their initial selection criteria. However, in the months leading up to the event, Dick outscored Williams at multiple competitions. The TTGF pulled Williams from the Olympic Test Event two days before the competition, and Dick flew into Rio to compete. Williams' appeal to the Trinidad and Tobago Olympic Committee was then denied. Dick finished 55th in the all-around and earned a berth to the Olympic Games.

Dick represented Trinidad and Tobago at the 2016 Summer Olympics and became the country's first-ever Olympian in gymnastics. She fell off the uneven bars and finished 55th in the qualifications with an all-around score of 50.832. While there, she debuted a new balance beam mount, a switch leap with a half turn, that was named after her in the Code of Points. The Olympics were the final competition of Dick's career.

== Eponymous skills ==
Dick has two balance beam mounts named after her in the Code of Points.

Apparatus	Name	Description	Difficulty (Note: Valid for the 2025–2028 Code of Points)	Added to the Code of Points	Ref
Balance beam	Dick	Change leg leap to free cross split sit	C (0.3)	2015 World Championships	
Balance beam	Dick II	Leap with leg change and 1/2 turn (180°) to free cross split sit	D (0.4)	2016 Olympic Games	
