= Trinidad and Tobago at the 2004 Summer Olympics =

- IOC code: TTO (TRI used at these Games)
- NOC: Trinidad and Tobago Olympic Committee
- Website: www.ttoc.org

in Athens
- Competitors: 19 in 4 sports
- Flag bearer: Ato Boldon
- Medals Ranked 71st: Gold 0 Silver 0 Bronze 1 Total 1

Summer Olympics appearances (overview)
- 1948; 1952; 1956; 1960; 1964; 1968; 1972; 1976; 1980; 1984; 1988; 1992; 1996; 2000; 2004; 2008; 2012; 2016; 2020; 2024

Other related appearances
- British West Indies (1960 S)

Trinidad and Tobago competed at the 2004 Summer Olympics in Athens, Greece, from 13 to 29 August 2004. This was the nation's sixteenth appearance at the Summer Olympics as an independent nation, although it had previously appeared in four editions as part of the British colony and the West Indies Federation. Trinidad and Tobago Olympic Committee sent a total of nineteen athletes to the Games, ten men and nine women, to compete only in track and field (the largest by sport), shooting, swimming, and taekwondo, which made its Olympic debut; the nation's team size was relatively similar to the record in Sydney four years earlier.

Eight athletes from the Trinidad and Tobago team had previously competed in Sydney, including swimmer and double Pan American Games champion George Bovell, sprinters Ato Modibo, who later married to Caymanian athlete Cydonie Mothersille, and Ato Boldon, who became the most decorated athlete for Trinidad and Tobago with a staggering record of four Olympic medals. Because of his repeated successes and being the most sophisticated athlete of the team as a four-time Olympian, Boldon reprised his role to carry the Trinidad and Tobago flag in the opening ceremony for the second time.

Trinidad and Tobago left Athens with a remarkable historic milestone from George Bovell, being the nation's first ever swimmer to win an Olympic bronze medal in the men's 200 m individual medley.

== Medalists ==
Medal	Name	Sport	Event	Date
Bronze	George Bovell	Swimming	Men's 200 m individual medley	August 19

== Athletics ==
Trinidad and Tobago athletes have so far achieved qualifying standards in the following athletics events (up to a maximum of 3 athletes in each event at the 'A' Standard, and 1 at the 'B' Standard).

Men
Track & road events

Athlete	Event	Heat		Quarterfinal		Semifinal		Final	
Athlete	Event	Result	Rank	Result	Rank	Result	Rank	Result	Rank
Nicconnor Alexander	100 m	10.22	3 Q	10.48	7	Did not advance			
Ato Boldon	100 m	10.41	4	Did not advance					
Marc Burns	100 m	DSQ		Did not advance					
Sherridan Kirk	800 m	1:48.12	6	—		Did not advance			
Ato Modibo	400 m	46.29	4	—		Did not advance			
Nicconnor Alexander; Ato Boldon; Darrel Brown; Marc Burns	4 × 100 m relay	38.53 NR	=4	—				38.60	7

Field events

Athlete	Event	Qualification		Final	
Athlete	Event	Distance	Position	Distance	Position
Le Juan Simon	Triple jump	16.16	36	Did not advance	

Women
Track & road events

Athlete	Event	Heat		Quarterfinal		Semifinal		Final	
Athlete	Event	Result	Rank	Result	Rank	Result	Rank	Result	Rank
Fana Ashby	100 m	11.43	3 Q	11.54	7	Did not advance			
Fana Ashby; Kelly-Ann Baptiste; Ayanna Hutchinson; Wanda Hutson	4 × 100 m relay	DNF		—				Did not advance	

Field events

Athlete	Event	Qualification		Final	
Athlete	Event	Distance	Position	Distance	Position
Cleopatra Borel	Shot put	18.90 NR	3 Q	18.35	10
Candice Scott	Hammer throw	68.27	12 q	69.94 NR	9

Combined events – Heptathlon

Athlete	Event	100H	HJ	SP	200 m	LJ	JT	800 m	Final	Rank
Marsha Mark-Baird	Result	13.58	1.70	11.20	25.11	6.22	49.90	2:12.21	5962	25
Marsha Mark-Baird	Points	1039	855	608	877	918	858	807	5962	25

Key

- Note–Ranks given for track events are within the athlete's heat only
- Q = Qualified for the next round
- q = Qualified for the next round as a fastest loser or, in field events, by position without achieving the qualifying target
- NR = National record
- N/A = Round not applicable for the event
- Bye = Athlete not required to compete in round

== Shooting ==
One Trinidad and Tobago shooter qualified to compete in the following events:

Men

Athlete	Event	Qualification		Final	
Athlete	Event	Points	Rank	Points	Rank
Roger Daniel	10 m air pistol	574	=27	Did not advance	
Roger Daniel	50 m pistol	545	33	Did not advance	

== Swimming ==
Trinidad and Tobago swimmers earned qualifying standards in the following events (up to a maximum of 2 swimmers in each event at the A-standard time, and 1 at the B-standard time):

Men

Athlete	Event	Heat		Semifinal		Final	
Athlete	Event	Time	Rank	Time	Rank	Time	Rank
George Bovell	50 m freestyle	DNS		Did not advance			
George Bovell	100 m freestyle	49.61	12 Q	49.53 NR	11	Did not advance	
George Bovell	200 m freestyle	1:49.48 NR	12 Q	1:49.59	11	Did not advance	
George Bovell	200 m individual medley	2:00.65	3 Q	2:00.31	5 Q	1:58.80 NR	3rd place, bronze medalist(s)

Women

Athlete	Event	Heat		Semifinal		Final	
Athlete	Event	Time	Rank	Time	Rank	Time	Rank
Linda McEachrane	100 m freestyle	58.92	42	Did not advance			
Sharntelle McLean	50 m freestyle	26.86	38	Did not advance			

== Taekwondo ==
Trinidad and Tobago has qualified a single taekwondo jin through the North and South American Qualification Tournament.

Athlete	Event	Round of 16	Quarterfinals	Semifinals	Repechage 1	Repechage 2	Final / BM	
Athlete	Event	Opposition Result	Opposition Result	Opposition Result	Opposition Result	Opposition Result	Opposition Result	Rank
Chinedum Osuji	Men's −80 kg	Ahmadov (AZE); L 3–10	Did not advance					

== See also ==
- Trinidad and Tobago at the 2003 Pan American Games
