= Trinidad and Tobago at the 2024 Summer Olympics =

- IOC code: TTO
- NOC: Trinidad and Tobago Olympic Committee
- Website: www.ttoc.org

in Paris, France 26 July 2024 – 11 August 2024
- Competitors: 18 (10 men and 8 women) in 3 sports
- Flag bearers: Dylan Carter & Michelle-Lee Ahye
- Medals: Gold 0 Silver 0 Bronze 0 Total 0

Summer Olympics appearances (overview)
- 1948; 1952; 1956; 1960; 1964; 1968; 1972; 1976; 1980; 1984; 1988; 1992; 1996; 2000; 2004; 2008; 2012; 2016; 2020; 2024; 2028

Other related appearances
- British West Indies (1960 S)

Trinidad and Tobago competed at the 2024 Summer Olympics in Paris from 26 July to 11 August 2024. It was the nation's nineteenth appearance at the Summer Olympics, although the Trinidad and Tobago athletes previously attended four other editions under the British colony and under the West Indies Federation.

Jereem Richards ultimately fell short of his Olympic podium finish, finishing 4th in the Men's 400 metres. As a result, Trinidad and Tobago failed to earn any Olympic medals.

== Competitors ==
The following is the list of number of competitors in the Games.

Sport	Men	Women	Total
Athletics	7	7	14
Cycling	2	0	2
Swimming	1	1	2
Total	10	8	18

== Athletics ==
Track and field athletes from Trinidad & Tobago achieved the entry standards for Paris 2024, either by passing the direct qualifying mark (or time for track and road races) or by world ranking, in the following events (a maximum of 3 athletes each):

Key

- Note–Ranks given for track events are within the athlete's heat only
- Q = Qualified for the next round
- q = Qualified for the next round as a fastest loser or, in field events, by position without achieving the qualifying target
- NR = National record
- N/A = Round not applicable for the event
- Bye = Athlete not required to compete in round

Track and road events

Athlete	Event	Heat		Semifinal		Final	
Athlete	Event	Result	Rank	Result	Rank	Result	Rank
Devin Augustine	Men's 100 m	10.31	5	Did not advance			
Jereem Richards	Men's 400 m	44.31	2 Q	44.33	2 Q	43.78	4
Michelle-Lee Ahye	Women's 100 m	11.33	4	Did not advance			
Leah Bertrand	Women's 100 m	11.27	3 Q	11.37	9	Did not advance	
Elijah Joseph; Jaden Marchan; Shakeem McKay; Renny Quow; Jereem Richards	Men's 4 × 400 metres relay	3:06.73	8	—N/a		Did not advance	
Michelle-Lee Ahye; Leah Bertrand; Sanaa Frederick; Sole Frederick; Akilah Lewis	Women's 4 × 100 metres relay	43.99	8	—N/a		Did not advance	

Field events

Athlete	Event	Qualification		Final	
Athlete	Event	Distance	Position	Distance	Position
Keshorn Walcott	Men's javelin throw	83.02	11 q	86.16	7 SB
Portious Warren	Women's shot put	17.22	22	Did not advance	

== Cycling ==
=== Track ===
Trinidad and Tobago entered two riders, to compete in the men's sprint and keirin events, following the release of the final UCI Olympic rankings.

Sprint

Athlete	Event	Qualification		Round 1	Repechage 1	Round 2	Repechage 2	Round 3	Repechage 3	Quarterfinals	Semifinals	Finals / BM	
Athlete	Event	Time Speed (km/h)	Rank	Opposition Time Speed (km/h)	Opposition Time Speed (km/h)	Opposition Time Speed (km/h)	Opposition Time Speed (km/h)	Opposition Time Speed (km/h)	Opposition Time Speed (km/h)	Opposition Time Speed (km/h)	Opposition Time Speed (km/h)	Opposition Time Speed (km/h)	Rank
Kwesi Browne	Men's sprint	9.773; 73.672	26	Did not advance									
Nicholas Paul	Men's sprint	9.371; 76.833	9 Q	Obara (JPN); W 9.887; 72.823	Bye	Ota (JPN); W 9.949; 72.369	Bye	Carlin (GBR); L 9.965; 72.282	Obara (JPN); Hoffman (NZL); L 10.412; 71.692	Did not advance			

Keirin

Athlete	Event	Round 1	Repechage	Quarterfinals	Semifinals	Final
Athlete	Event	Rank	Rank	Rank	Rank	Rank
Kwesi Browne	Men's keirin	3 R	DNF	Did not advance		
Nicholas Paul	Men's keirin	1 Q	Bye	5	Did not advance	

== Swimming ==
Swimmers from Trinidad and Tobago achieved the entry standards in the following events for Paris 2024 (a maximum of two swimmers under the Olympic Qualifying Time (OST) and potentially at the Olympic Consideration Time (OCT)):

Athlete	Event	Heat		Semifinal		Final	
Athlete	Event	Time	Rank	Time	Rank	Time	Rank
Dylan Carter	Men's 50 m freestyle	22.18	29	Did not advance			
Dylan Carter	Men's 100 m freestyle	49.35	34	Did not advance			
Zuri Ferguson	Women's 100 m backstroke	1:02.75	27	Did not advance			

== See also ==
- Trinidad and Tobago at the 2023 Pan American Games
