= Trinidad and Tobago at the 1976 Summer Olympics =

- IOC code: TTO (TRI used at these Games)
- NOC: Trinidad and Tobago Olympic Committee

in Montreal
- Competitors: 13 in 3 sports
- Flag bearer: Hasely Crawford
- Medals Ranked 26th: Gold 1 Silver 0 Bronze 0 Total 1

Summer Olympics appearances (overview)
- 1948; 1952; 1956; 1960; 1964; 1968; 1972; 1976; 1980; 1984; 1988; 1992; 1996; 2000; 2004; 2008; 2012; 2016; 2020; 2024; 2028

Other related appearances
- British West Indies (1960 S)

Athletes from Trinidad and Tobago competed at the 1976 Summer Olympics in Montreal, Quebec, Canada. Thirteen competitors, all men, took part in ten events in three sports. This was Trinidad and Tobago's first Olympic gold medal victory.

== Medalists ==
=== Gold ===
- Hasely Crawford – Athletics, Men's 100 metres

== Athletics ==
Men's 800 metres

- Horace Tuitt

- Heat – did not finish (→ did not advance)

Men's 4 × 100 metres Relay

- Anthony Husbands, Chris Brathwaite, Charles Joseph, and Francis Adams

- Heat – 40.08s
- Semi Finals – 39.88s (→ did not advance)

Men's 4 × 400 metres Relay

- Mike Solomon, Charles Joseph, Horace Tuitt, and Joseph Coombs

- Heat – 3:03.54
- Final – 3:03.46 (→ 6th place)

Men's Long Jump

- George Swanston

- Qualification – 7.40m (→ did not advance)

== Cycling ==
Two cyclists represented Trinidad and Tobago in 1976.

Sprint

- Leslie Rawlins – 23rd place

1000m time trial

- Anthony Sellier – 1:11.103 (→ 20th place)
