= Trinidad and Tobago at the 1980 Summer Olympics =

- IOC code: TTO (TRI used at these Games)
- NOC: Trinidad and Tobago Olympic Committee

in Moscow
- Competitors: 10 in 1 sport
- Flag bearer: Hasely Crawford
- Medals: Gold 0 Silver 0 Bronze 0 Total 0

Summer Olympics appearances (overview)
- 1948; 1952; 1956; 1960; 1964; 1968; 1972; 1976; 1980; 1984; 1988; 1992; 1996; 2000; 2004; 2008; 2012; 2016; 2020; 2024

Other related appearances
- British West Indies (1960 S)

Athletes from Trinidad and Tobago competed at the 1980 Summer Olympics in Moscow, USSR.

== Results by event ==
Men's 100 metres

- Christopher Brathwaite

- Heat – 10.44
- Quarterfinals – 10.37
- Semifinals – 10.54 (did not advance)

- Hasely Crawford

- Heat – 10.42
- Quarterfinals – 10.28 (did not advance)

Men's 4x400 metres Relay

- Joseph Coombs, Charles Joseph, Rafer Mohammed, and Mike Solomon

- Heat – 3:04.3
- Final – 3:06.6 (6th place)
