= Trinidad and Tobago at the 2016 Summer Olympics =

- IOC code: TTO
- NOC: Trinidad and Tobago Olympic Committee
- Website: www.ttoc.org

in Rio de Janeiro
- Competitors: 32 in 8 sports
- Flag bearer: Keshorn Walcott
- Medals Ranked 78th: Gold 0 Silver 0 Bronze 1 Total 1

Summer Olympics appearances (overview)
- 1948; 1952; 1956; 1960; 1964; 1968; 1972; 1976; 1980; 1984; 1988; 1992; 1996; 2000; 2004; 2008; 2012; 2016; 2020; 2024

Other related appearances
- British West Indies (1960 S)

Trinidad and Tobago competed at the 2016 Summer Olympics in Rio de Janeiro, from August 5 to 21, 2016. This was the nation's seventeenth appearance at the Summer Olympics, although it previously competed in four other editions as a British colony, and as part of the West Indies Federation.

Trinidad and Tobago Olympic Committee fielded a team of 32 athletes, 21 men and 11 women, to compete in eight different sports at these Games. It was the nation's largest ever delegation sent to the Olympics, eclipsing the record of 30 athletes who attended the London Games four years earlier. For the first time in Olympic history, Trinidad and Tobago registered its athletes in artistic gymnastics, judo and rowing. As usual, athletics had the largest team by sport with 24 competitors, roughly three quarters of the nation's full roster size.

The Trinidad and Tobago team featured five Olympic medalists from London, including sprinter Lalonde Gordon in the 400 metres, and javelin thrower Keshorn Walcott, who won the nation's first ever gold after nearly four decades. Looking to defend his title in Rio de Janeiro, Walcott was selected to lead the Trinidad and Tobago contingent as the flag bearer in the opening ceremony. Athens 2004 bronze medalist George Bovell joined the elite club of world-ranked swimmers who have participated in five Olympic Games, while shot putter and reigning Pan American Games champion Cleopatra Borel made history for Trinidad and Tobago as the first female athlete to compete in four Olympics. Other notable athletes on the Trinidad and Tobago roster also included Laser sailor Andrew Lewis, London 2012 semifinalist Njisane Phillip in track cycling, Canadian-born gymnast Marisa Dick, and 39-year-old single sculls rower Felice Chow (the oldest competitor of the team).

Trinidad and Tobago left Rio de Janeiro with only a bronze medal won by Walcott, following up on the gold he had earned in London and narrowly sparing from an out-of-medal feat for the first time since 1992. Several athletes on the Trinidad and Tobago team missed the opportunity to join Walcott on the podium, including Borel (seventh, women's shot put), Cedenio (fourth, men's 400 m), and sprinter Michelle-Lee Ahye, the first woman from her country to appear in three finals at a single edition.

== Medalists ==
Medal	Name	Sport	Event	Date
Bronze	Keshorn Walcott	Athletics	Men's javelin throw	20 August

== Athletics (track and field) ==
Athletes from Trinidad and Tobago have so far achieved qualifying standards in the following athletics events (up to a maximum of 3 athletes in each event):

A total of 24 athletes (15 men and 9 women) were selected to the nation's track and field team for the Games, based on their results achieved at the Olympic Trials and T&T Open Championships. Among them were reigning Olympic champion Keshorn Walcott (men's javelin throw) and bronze medalists Lalonde Gordon, Machel Cedenio, Jarrin Solomon, and Renny Quow.

Key

- Note–Ranks given for track events are within the athlete's heat only
- Q = Qualified for the next round
- q = Qualified for the next round as a fastest loser or, in field events, by position without achieving the qualifying target
- NR = National record
- N/A = Round not applicable for the event
- Bye = Athlete not required to compete in round

Track & road events
Men

Athlete	Event	Heat		Quarterfinal		Semifinal		Final	
Athlete	Event	Result	Rank	Result	Rank	Result	Rank	Result	Rank
Keston Bledman	100 m	Bye		10.20	5	Did not advance			
Rondel Sorrillo	100 m	Bye		10.23	3	Did not advance			
Richard Thompson	100 m	Bye		10.29	6	Did not advance			
Kyle Greaux	200 m	20.61	4	—N/a		Did not advance			
Rondel Sorrillo	200 m	20.27 SB	3 q	—N/a		20.33	5	Did not advance	
Machel Cedenio	400 m	44.98	1 Q	—N/a		44.39	1 Q	44.01 NR	4
Lalonde Gordon	400 m	45.24	1 Q	—N/a		45.13	8	Did not advance	
Deon Lendore	400 m	46.15	6	—N/a		Did not advance			
Mikel Thomas	110 m hurdles	13.68	6	—N/a		Did not advance			
Jehue Gordon	400 m hurdles	49.90 SB	8	—N/a		Did not advance			
Keston Bledman; Emmanuel Callender; Marcus Duncan; Kyle Greaux; Rondel Sorrillo; Richard Thompson	4 × 100 m relay	37.96	3 Q	—N/a				DSQ	
Machel Cedenio; Lalonde Gordon; Deon Lendore; Renny Quow; Jereem Richards; Jarrin Solomon	4 × 400 m relay	DSQ		—N/a				Did not advance	

Women

Athlete	Event	Heat		Quarterfinal		Semifinal		Final	
Athlete	Event	Result	Rank	Result	Rank	Result	Rank	Result	Rank
Michelle-Lee Ahye	100 m	Bye		11.00	1 Q	10.90	2 Q	10.92	6
Kelly-Ann Baptiste	100 m	Bye		11.42	4	Did not advance			
Semoy Hackett	100 m	Bye		11.35	3 q	11.20	5	Did not advance	
Michelle-Lee Ahye	200 m	22.50	1 Q	—N/a		22.25	2 Q	22.34	6
Semoy Hackett	200 m	22.78	2 Q	—N/a		22.94	6	Did not advance	
Reyare Thomas	200 m	22.97	5	—N/a		Did not advance			
Janeil Bellille	400 m hurdles	56.25	5 q	—N/a		56.06	6	Did not advance	
Sparkle McKnight	400 m hurdles	56.80	5	—N/a		Did not advance			
Michelle-Lee Ahye; Kelly-Ann Baptiste; Semoy Hackett; Khalifa St. Fort; Kai Selvon; Reyare Thomas	4 × 100 m relay	42.62	3 Q	—N/a				42.12	5

Field events

Athlete	Event	Qualification		Final	
Athlete	Event	Distance	Position	Distance	Position
Keshorn Walcott	Men's javelin throw	88.68	1 Q	85.38	3rd place, bronze medalist(s)
Cleopatra Borel	Women's shot put	18.20	8 q	18.37	7

== Boxing ==
Trinidad and Tobago entered one boxer to compete in the men's super heavyweight division into the Olympic boxing tournament. Nigel Paul had claimed his Olympic spot with a semifinal victory at the 2016 American Qualification Tournament in Buenos Aires, Argentina.

Athlete	Event	Round of 32	Round of 16	Quarterfinals	Semifinals	Final	
Athlete	Event	Opposition Result	Opposition Result	Opposition Result	Opposition Result	Opposition Result	Rank
Nigel Paul	Men's super heavyweight	Bye	Ajagba (NGR); L KO	Did not advance			

== Cycling ==
=== Track ===
Following the completion of the 2016 UCI Track Cycling World Championships, Trinidad and Tobago entered one rider to compete only in the men's sprint at the Olympics, by virtue of his final individual UCI Olympic rankings in that event.

Sprint

Athlete	Event	Qualification		Round 1	Repechage 1	Round 2	Repechage 2	Quarterfinals	Semifinals	Final	
Athlete	Event	Time Speed (km/h)	Rank	Opposition Time Speed (km/h)	Opposition Time Speed (km/h)	Opposition Time Speed (km/h)	Opposition Time Speed (km/h)	Opposition Time Speed (km/h)	Opposition Time Speed (km/h)	Opposition Time Speed (km/h)	Rank
Njisane Phillip	Men's sprint	9.813; 73.372	6 Q	Xu C (CHN); L	Levy (GER); Dawkins (NZL); L	Did not advance					

== Gymnastics ==
=== Artistic ===
Trinidad and Tobago entered one artistic gymnast for the first time into the Olympic competition. Originally, the spot was earned by Trinidad born gymnast Thema Williams in the Scotland qualifier. She was later replaced due to controversy* and apparent lack of support by officials on the local gymnastics body the TTGF. Marisa Dick a Canadian born of a Trinidadian mother had claimed her (William's) Olympic spot in the women's apparatus and all-around events at the Olympic Test Event in Rio de Janeiro.

Women

Athlete	Event	Qualification						Final					
Athlete	Event	Apparatus				Total	Rank	Apparatus				Total	Rank
Athlete	Event	V	UB	BB	F	Total	Rank	V	UB	BB	F	Total	Rank
Marisa Dick	Uneven bars	—N/a	11.333	—N/a		11.333	79	Did not advance					
Marisa Dick	Balance beam	—N/a		13.066	—N/a	13.066	58	Did not advance					
Marisa Dick	Floor	—N/a			12.533	12.533	70	Did not advance					

== Judo ==
Trinidad and Tobago has qualified one judoka for the men's half-heavyweight category (100 kg) at the Games, signifying the nation's Olympic debut in the sport. Christopher George earned a continental quota spot from the Pan American region, as Trinidad and Tobago's sole judoka in the IJF World Ranking List of May 30, 2016.

Athlete	Event	Round of 64	Round of 32	Round of 16	Quarterfinals	Semifinals	Repechage	Final / BM	
Athlete	Event	Opposition Result	Opposition Result	Opposition Result	Opposition Result	Opposition Result	Opposition Result	Opposition Result	Rank
Christopher George	Men's −100 kg	Bye	Soe (MYA); L 000–002	Did not advance					

== Rowing ==
For the first time in Olympic history, Trinidad and Tobago has qualified one boat in the women's single sculls for the Games at the 2016 Latin American Continental Qualification Regatta in Valparaíso, Chile.

Athlete	Event	Heats		Repechage		Quarterfinals		Semifinals		Final	
Athlete	Event	Time	Rank	Time	Rank	Time	Rank	Time	Rank	Time	Rank
Felice Chow	Women's single sculls	8:31.83	5 R	8:04.91	2 QF	8:02.53	5 SC/D	8:20.07	4 FD	7:50.23	22

Qualification Legend: FA=Final A (medal); FB=Final B (non-medal); FC=Final C (non-medal); FD=Final D (non-medal); FE=Final E (non-medal); FF=Final F (non-medal); SA/B=Semifinals A/B; SC/D=Semifinals C/D; SE/F=Semifinals E/F; QF=Quarterfinals; R=Repechage

== Sailing ==
Trinidad & Tobago has qualified a boat in men's Laser class by virtue of a top finish for North America at the 2015 Pan American Games.

Athlete	Event	Race											Net points	Final rank
Athlete	Event	1	2	3	4	5	6	7	8	9	10	M*	Net points	Final rank
Andrew Lewis	Men's Laser	42	34	39	36	41	34	31	~~BFD~~	36	32	EL	324	39

M = Medal race; EL = Eliminated – did not advance into the medal race

== Swimming ==
Swimmers from Trinidad & Tobago have so far achieved qualifying standards in the following events (up to a maximum of 2 swimmers in each event at the Olympic Qualifying Time (OQT), and potentially 1 at the Olympic Selection Time (OST)):

Men

Athlete	Event	Heat		Semifinal		Final	
Athlete	Event	Time	Rank	Time	Rank	Time	Rank
George Bovell	50 m freestyle	22.30	27	Did not advance			
Dylan Carter	100 m freestyle	48.80 NR	23	Did not advance			

== See also ==
- Trinidad and Tobago at the 2015 Pan American Games
