= Trinidad and Tobago at the 2020 Summer Olympics =

- IOC code: TTO
- NOC: Trinidad and Tobago Olympic Committee
- Website: www.ttoc.org

in Tokyo, Japan July 23, 2021 – August 8, 2021
- Competitors: 24 in 7 sports
- Flag bearer (opening): Kelly-Ann Baptiste
- Flag bearer (closing): Andwuelle Wright
- Medals: Gold 0 Silver 0 Bronze 0 Total 0

Summer Olympics appearances (overview)
- 1948; 1952; 1956; 1960; 1964; 1968; 1972; 1976; 1980; 1984; 1988; 1992; 1996; 2000; 2004; 2008; 2012; 2016; 2020; 2024

Other related appearances
- British West Indies (1960 S)

Trinidad and Tobago competed at the 2020 Summer Olympics in Tokyo. Originally scheduled to take place from 24 July to 9 August 2020, the Games were postponed to 23 July to 8 August 2021, due to the COVID-19 pandemic. It was the nation's eighteenth appearance at the Summer Olympics, although it previously competed in four other editions as a British colony, and as part of the West Indies Federation.

The 2020 Olympics were somewhat of a disappointment for Trinidad and Tobago, as it was the first Olympics since 1992 that they failed to win any medals.

== Competitors ==
Sport	Men	Women	Total
Athletics	8	7	15
Boxing	1	0	1
Cycling	2	1	3
Judo	0	1	1
Rowing	0	1	1
Sailing	1	0	1
Swimming	1	1	2
Total	13	11	24

== Athletics ==
Athletes from Trinidad and Tobago further achieved the entry standards, either by qualifying time or by world ranking, in the following track and field events (up to a maximum of 3 athletes in each event).

The Trinidad and Tobago Olympic Committee confirmed on 30 July that Andwuelle Wright and Sparkle McKnight tested positive for COVID-19, and they will not participate in the competitions on 31 July.

Key

- Note–Ranks given for track events are within the athlete's heat only
- Q = Qualified for the next round
- q = Qualified for the next round as a fastest loser or, in field events, by position without achieving the qualifying target
- NR = National record
- N/A = Round not applicable for the event
- Bye = Athlete not required to compete in round

Track & road events
Men

Athlete	Event	Heat		Semifinal		Final	
Athlete	Event	Result	Rank	Result	Rank	Result	Rank
Kyle Greaux	200 m	20.77	4	Did not advance			
Jereem Richards	200 m	20.52	1 Q	20.10 SB	3 q	20.39	8
Machel Cedenio	400 m	46.56	3 Q	45.86	6	Did not advance	
Deon Lendore	400 m	45.14	2 Q	44.93	4	Did not advance	
Dwight St. Hillaire	400 m	45.41	4 q	45.58	7	Did not advance	
Kion Benjamin; Eric Harrison Jr. Akanni Hislop; Richard Thompson	4 × 100 m relay	38.63	6	—		Did not advance	
Machel Cedenio; Deon Lendore; Jereem Richards; Dwight St. Hillaire	4 × 400 m relay	2:58.60 SB	2 Q	—		3:00.85	8

Women

Athlete	Event	Heat		Quarterfinal		Semifinal		Final	
Athlete	Event	Result	Rank	Result	Rank	Result	Rank	Result	Rank
Michelle-Lee Ahye	100 m	Bye		11.06	1 Q	11.00	3	Did not advance	
Kelly-Ann Baptiste	100 m	Bye		11.48	6	Did not advance			
Sparkle McKnight	400 m hurdles	DNS		—		Did not advance			
Khalifa St. Fort; Michelle-Lee Ahye; Kai Selvon; Kelly-Ann Baptiste	4 × 100 m relay	43.62	8	—				Did not advance	

Field events

Athlete	Event	Qualification		Final	
Athlete	Event	Distance	Position	Distance	Position
Andwuelle Wright	Men's long jump	DNS		Did not advance	
Keshorn Walcott	Men's javelin throw	79.33	16	Did not advance	
Tyra Gittens	Women's long jump	6.72	9 q	6.60	10
Portious Warren	Women's shot put	18.75 PB	5 Q	18.32	11

== Boxing ==
Trinidad and Tobago entered one male boxer into the Olympic tournament. With the cancellation of the 2021 Pan American Qualification Tournament in Buenos Aires, Argentina, Aaron Prince finished fourth in the men's middleweight division to secure a place on the Trinidad and Tobago team based on the IOC's Boxing Task Force Rankings.

Athlete	Event	Round of 32	Round of 16	Quarterfinals	Semifinals	Final	
Athlete	Event	Opposition Result	Opposition Result	Opposition Result	Opposition Result	Opposition Result	Rank
Aaron Prince	Men's middleweight	Csemez (SVK); L 0–4	Did not advance				

== Cycling ==
=== Road ===
For the first time in history, Trinidad and Tobago entered one rider to compete in the women's Olympic road race, by virtue of her top 100 individual finish (for women) in the UCI World Ranking.

Athlete	Event	Time	Rank
Teniel Campbell	Women's road race	Did not finish	

=== Track ===
Following the completion of the 2020 UCI Track Cycling World Championships, Trinidad and Tobago entered at least one rider to compete in the men's sprint and keirin based on his final individual UCI Olympic rankings.

Sprint

Athlete	Event	Qualification		Round 1	Repechage 1	Round 2	Repechage 2	Round 3	Repechage 3	Quarterfinals	Semifinals	Final	
Athlete	Event	Time Speed (km/h)	Rank	Opposition Time Speed (km/h)	Opposition Time Speed (km/h)	Opposition Time Speed (km/h)	Opposition Time Speed (km/h)	Opposition Time Speed (km/h)	Opposition Time Speed (km/h)	Opposition Time Speed (km/h)	Opposition Time Speed (km/h)	Opposition Time Speed (km/h)	Rank
Kwesi Browne	Men's sprint	9.966; 72.246	30	Did not advance									
Nicholas Paul	Men's sprint	9.316; 77.286	4 Q	Richardson (AUS); W 9.824; 73.290	Bye	Awang (MAS); W 9.798; 73.484	Bye	Wakimoto (JPN); W 10.091; 71.351	Bye	Dmitriev (ROC); L, L	Did not advance	5th place final Vigier (FRA); Kenny (GBR); Levy (GER); L	6

Keirin

Athlete	Event	Round 1	Repechage	Quarterfinals	Semifinals	Final
Athlete	Event	Rank	Rank	Rank	Rank	Rank
Kwesi Browne	Men's keirin	3 R	1 QF	3 SF	5 FB	9
Nicholas Paul	Men's keirin	2 QF	—	1 SF	DSQ	Did not advance

== Judo ==
Trinidad and Tobago qualified one judoka for the women's heavyweight category (+78 kg) at the Games. Gabriella Wood accepted a continental berth from the Americas as the nation's top-ranked judoka outside of direct qualifying position in the IJF World Ranking List of June 28, 2021.

Athlete	Event	Round of 32	Round of 16	Quarterfinals	Semifinals	Repechage	Final / BM	
Athlete	Event	Opposition Result	Opposition Result	Opposition Result	Opposition Result	Opposition Result	Opposition Result	Rank
Gabriella Wood	Women's +78 kg	Slutskaya (BLR); L 00–10	Did not advance					

== Rowing ==
Trinidad and Tobago qualified one boat in the women's single sculls for the Games by winning the bronze medal and securing the third of five berths available at the 2021 FISA Americas Olympic Qualification Regatta in Rio de Janeiro, Brazil.

Athlete	Event	Heats		Repechage		Quarterfinals		Semifinals		Final	
Athlete	Event	Time	Rank	Time	Rank	Time	Rank	Time	Rank	Time	Rank
Felice Chow	Women's single sculls	8:02.02	4 R	8:15.94	1 QF	8:21.23	5 SC/D	7:45.14	4 FD	7:48.06	19

Qualification Legend: FA=Final A (medal); FB=Final B (non-medal); FC=Final C (non-medal); FD=Final D (non-medal); FE=Final E (non-medal); FF=Final F (non-medal); SA/B=Semifinals A/B; SC/D=Semifinals C/D; SE/F=Semifinals E/F; QF=Quarterfinals; R=Repechage

== Sailing ==
Sailors from Trinidad and Tobago qualified one boat in each of the following classes through the class-associated World Championships, and the continental regattas.

Athlete	Event	Race											Net points	Final rank
Athlete	Event	1	2	3	4	5	6	7	8	9	10	M*	Net points	Final rank
Andrew Lewis	Men's Laser	23	29	27	~~31~~	30	15	23	24	25	7	EL	203	29

M = Medal race; EL = Eliminated – did not advance into the medal race

== Swimming ==
Swimmers from Trinidad and Tobago further achieved qualifying standards in the following events (up to a maximum of 2 swimmers in each event at the Olympic Qualifying Time (OQT), and potentially 1 at the Olympic Selection Time (OST)):

Athlete	Event	Heat		Semifinal		Final	
Athlete	Event	Time	Rank	Time	Rank	Time	Rank
Dylan Carter	Men's 50 m freestyle	22.46	=33	Did not advance			
Dylan Carter	Men's 100 m freestyle	48.66	22	Did not advance			
Dylan Carter	Men's 100 m backstroke	54.82	32	Did not advance			
Dylan Carter	Men's 100 m butterfly	52.36	33	Did not advance			
Cherelle Thompson	Women's 50 m freestyle	26.19	41	Did not advance			

== See also ==
- Trinidad and Tobago at the 2019 Pan American Games
