= Trinidad and Tobago at the 1948 Summer Olympics =

- IOC code: TTO (TRI used at these Games)
- NOC: Trinidad and Tobago Olympic Committee

in London
- Competitors: 5 in 3 sports
- Flag bearer: Wilfred Tull
- Officials: 4
- Medals Ranked 28th: Gold 0 Silver 1 Bronze 0 Total 1

Summer Olympics appearances (overview)
- 1948; 1952; 1956; 1960; 1964; 1968; 1972; 1976; 1980; 1984; 1988; 1992; 1996; 2000; 2004; 2008; 2012; 2016; 2020; 2024

Other related appearances
- British West Indies (1960 S)

Trinidad and Tobago competed at the Summer Olympic Games for the first time at the 1948 Summer Olympics in London, England. The Trinidad and Tobago Olympic Committee sent five athletes and four officials to represent the nation in three sports. Errol Knowles was the Chef de Mission.

== Medalists ==
=== Silver ===
- Rodney Wilkes – Weightlifting, Men's Featherweight

== Athletics ==
Men's 100 metres

- George Lewis

Men's 200 metres

- George Lewis

Men's 800 metres

- Wilfred Tull

Men's 1500 metres

- Wilfred Tull

Men's 5000 metres

- Manny Ramjohn

Men's 10000 metres

- Manny Ramjohn

A.E. Browne – Manager/Coach

== Cycling ==
Sprint

- Compton Gonsalves

Time trial

- Compton Gonsalves – 1:32 (17th place)

Laurie Rogers – Manager/Coach

== Weightlifting ==
Men's Featherweight

- Rodney Wilkes – 317.5 kg (silver medal)

Lionel Seemungal – Manager/Coach
