= Trinidad and Tobago at the 1952 Summer Olympics =

- IOC code: TTO (TRI used at these Games)
- NOC: Trinidad and Tobago Olympic Committee

in Helsinki, Finland 19 July–3 August 1952
- Flag bearer: Rodney Wilkes
- Medals Ranked 37th: Gold 0 Silver 0 Bronze 2 Total 2

Summer Olympics appearances (overview)
- 1948; 1952; 1956; 1960; 1964; 1968; 1972; 1976; 1980; 1984; 1988; 1992; 1996; 2000; 2004; 2008; 2012; 2016; 2020; 2024

Other related appearances
- British West Indies (1960 S)

Athletes from Trinidad and Tobago competed at the 1952 Summer Olympics in Helsinki, Finland.

== Medalists ==
=== Bronze ===
- Rodney Wilkes — Weightlifting, Men's Featherweight
- Lennox Kilgour — Weightlifting, Men's Middle Heavyweight

== Sources ==
- Official Olympic Reports
- International Olympic Committee results database
