= Trinidad and Tobago at the 1956 Summer Olympics =

- IOC code: TTO (TRI used at these Games)
- NOC: Trinidad and Tobago Olympic Committee

in Melbourne, Australia/Stockholm, Sweden 22 November–8 December 1956
- Competitors: 6 in 3 sports
- Flag bearer: Mike Agostini
- Medals: Gold 0 Silver 0 Bronze 0 Total 0

Summer Olympics appearances (overview)
- 1948; 1952; 1956; 1960; 1964; 1968; 1972; 1976; 1980; 1984; 1988; 1992; 1996; 2000; 2004; 2008; 2012; 2016; 2020; 2024

Other related appearances
- British West Indies (1960 S)

Trinidad and Tobago competed at the 1956 Summer Olympics in Melbourne, Australia. Six competitors, all men, took part in seven events in three sports.

== Cycling ==
Sprint

- Hylton Mitchell – 13th place

Time trial

- Hylton Mitchell – 1:16.5 (→ 19th place)

Individual road race

- Hylton Mitchell – did not finish (→ no ranking)
