= Cayman Islands at the 2016 Summer Olympics =

- Flag of the Cayman Islands
- IOC code: CAY
- NOC: Cayman Islands Olympic Committee
- Website: www.caymanolympic.org.ky

in Rio de Janeiro
- Competitors: 5 in 3 sports
- Flag bearer: Ronald Forbes
- Medals: Gold 0 Silver 0 Bronze 0 Total 0

Summer Olympics appearances (overview)
- 1976; 1980; 1984; 1988; 1992; 1996; 2000; 2004; 2008; 2012; 2016; 2020; 2024; 2028

Cayman Islands competed at the 2016 Summer Olympics in Rio de Janeiro, Brazil, from 5 to 21 August 2016. This was the nation's tenth appearance at the Summer Olympics.

Cayman Islands Olympic Committee selected a total of five athletes, three men and two women, for the Games across three different sports (athletics, sailing, and swimming), matching its roster size from London 2012. Among the sports represented by the athletes, Cayman Islands marked its Olympic return in sailing after a sixteen-year absence.

The Caymanian team featured swimming siblings Geoffrey and Lara Butler, Laser Radial sailor Florence Allan, track sprinter Kemar Hyman, and hurdler Ronald Forbes, who joined Kareem Streete-Thompson as the only athletes to compete in three editions of the Games. The most experienced member of the team, Forbes was chosen by the committee to lead the delegation for the second time as Cayman Islands' flag bearer in the opening ceremony. Cayman Islands, however, has yet to win its first Olympic medal.

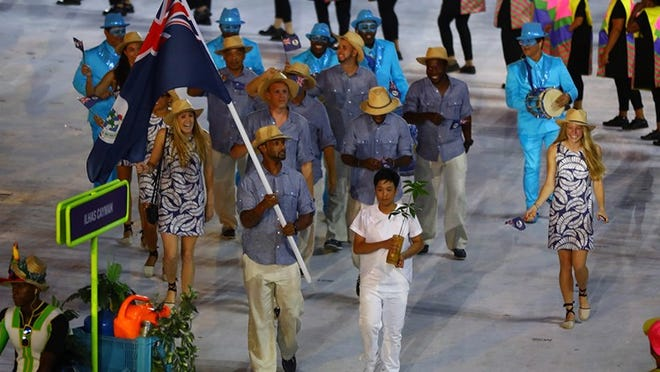
Cayman Islands entering stadium at 2016 Summer Olympics Opening Ceremony

== Athletics (track and field) ==
Caymanian athletes achieved qualifying standards in the following athletics events (up to a maximum of 3 athletes in each event):

Key

- Note–Ranks given for track events are within the athlete's heat only
- Q = Qualified for the next round
- q = Qualified for the next round as a fastest loser or, in field events, by position without achieving the qualifying target
- NR = National record
- N/A = Round not applicable for the event
- Bye = Athlete not required to compete in round
- NM = No mark

Track & road events

Athlete	Event	Heat		Quarterfinal		Semifinal		Final	
Athlete	Event	Result	Rank	Result	Rank	Result	Rank	Result	Rank
Ronald Forbes	Men's 110 m hurdles	14.67	6	—N/a		did not advance			
Kemar Hyman	Men's 100 m	Bye		10.34	7	did not advance			

== Sailing ==
Cayman Islands received an invitation from the Tripartite Commission to send a sailor competing in the Laser Radial class to the Olympics, signifying the nation's comeback to the sport for the first time since 2000.

Athlete	Event	Race											Net points	Final rank
Athlete	Event	1	2	3	4	5	6	7	8	9	10	M*	Net points	Final rank
Florence Allan	Women's Laser Radial	35	34	31	36	~~DNF~~	DNF	32	34	33	36	EL	308	36

M = Medal race; EL = Eliminated – did not advance into the medal race

== Swimming ==
Cayman Islands received a Universality invitation from FINA to send two swimmers (one male and one female) to the Olympics.

Athlete	Event	Heat		Semifinal		Final	
Athlete	Event	Time	Rank	Time	Rank	Time	Rank
Geoffrey Butler	Men's 400 m freestyle	4:07.87	48	—N/a		did not advance	
Lara Butler	Women's 100 m backstroke	1:04.98	29	did not advance			

== See also ==
- Cayman Islands at the 2015 Pan American Games
