= Cayman Islands at the 2024 Summer Olympics =

- Flag of the Cayman Islands
- IOC code: CAY
- NOC: Cayman Islands Olympic Committee
- Website: www.caymanolympic.org.ky

in Paris, France 26 July 2024 – 11 August 2024
- Competitors: 4 (2 men and 2 women) in 3 sports
- Flag bearers: Jordan Crooks & Charlotte Webster
- Medals: Gold 0 Silver 0 Bronze 0 Total 0

Summer Olympics appearances (overview)
- 1976; 1980; 1984; 1988; 1992; 1996; 2000; 2004; 2008; 2012; 2016; 2020; 2024

Cayman Islands competed at the 2024 Summer Olympics in Paris from 26 July to 11 August 2024. It was the nation's twelfth consecutive appearance at the Summer Olympics since their debut at the 1976 Summer Olympics, with the exception of 1980 as part of US led boycott.

== Competitors ==
Sport	Men	Women	Total
Athletics	1	0	1
Sailing	0	1	1
Swimming	1	1	2
Total	2	2	4

== Athletics ==
Cayman Islands sent one sprinter to compete at the 2024 Summer Olympics.

Key

- Note–Ranks given for track events are within the athlete's heat only
- Q = Qualified for the next round
- q = Qualified for the next round as a fastest loser or, in field events, by position without achieving the qualifying target
- NR = National record
- N/A = Round not applicable for the event
- Bye = Athlete not required to compete in round

Track events

Athlete	Event	Preliminary		Heat		Repechage		Semifinal		Final	
Athlete	Event	Time	Rank	Time	Rank	Time	Rank	Time	Rank	Time	Rank
Davonte Howell	Men's 100 m	10.31	1 Q	10.24	6	—N/a		Did not advance			

== Sailing ==
For the first time since 2016, Caymanian sailors qualified one boat in the following classes through the 2023 Pan American Games in Algarrobo, Chile.

Medal race events

Athlete	Event	Race										Net points	Final rank
Athlete	Event	1	2	3	4	5	6	7	8	9	M*	Net points	Final rank
Charlotte Webster	Women's ILCA 6	41	40	39	41	36	40	32	~~43~~	37	EL	306	41

M = Medal race; EL = Eliminated – did not advance into the medal race

== Swimming ==
Caymanian swimmers achieved the entry standards in the following events for Paris 2024 (a maximum of two swimmers under the Olympic Qualifying Time (OST) and potentially at the Olympic Consideration Time (OCT)):

Athlete	Event	Heat		Semi-Final		Final	
Athlete	Event	Time	Rank	Time	Rank	Time	Rank
Jordan Crooks	Men's 50 m freestyle	21.51	2 Q	21.54	4 Q	21.64	8
Jordan Crooks	Men's 100 m freestyle	48.01	5 Q	48.10	13	Did not advance	
Jillian Crooks	Women's 100 m freestyle	56.15	23	Did not advance			

== See also ==
- Cayman Islands at the 2023 Pan American Games
