= Vincent Lynch (cyclist) =

Personal information
- Born: 21 September 1968 (age 58)

Cycling career
- Sport: Cycling

Vincent Lynch (born 21 September 1968) is a Barbadian former cyclist. He competed in the sprint event at the 1988 Summer Olympics.
