= Mirren =

Mirren is a surname. Notable people with the surname include:

- Helen Mirren (born 1945), English actor
- Simon Mirren, British television writer and producer, nephew of Helen

== See also ==
- Merren
- St Mirren (disambiguation)
