= Gustavo Faris =

Argentine cyclist

Personal information
- Born: 17 February 1962 (age 64)

Cycling career
- Sport: Cycling

Gustavo Faris (born 17 February 1962) is an Argentine former cyclist. He competed in the sprint event at the 1988 Summer Olympics, multiple times track and road Argentine champion and won two track world championships in Manchester on 2015 in category +50 years.
