= St Mirren =

St Mirren or St. Mirren may refer to:

- Saint Mirin (c. 565 – c. 620), Irish monk and missionary also known as Mirren of Benchor (now called Bangor), Merinus, Merryn and Meadhrán
- St Mirren F.C., a professional football team from Paisley, Renfrewshire, Scotland
  - St Mirren Park, a football stadium

== See also ==
- Mirren, a surname
