= Vratislav Šustr =

Czech cyclist

Personal information
- Born: 24 July 1959 (age 67) Prostějov, Czechoslovakia

Cycling career
- Sport: Cycling

Vratislav Šustr (born 24 July 1959) is a Czech former cyclist. He competed in the sprint event at the 1988 Summer Olympics.
