= Andrea Faccini =

Italian cyclist

Personal information
- Born: 23 August 1966 (age 60) Lugagnano Val d'Arda, Italy

Cycling career
- Sport: Cycling

Andrea Faccini (born 23 August 1966) is an Italian former cyclist. He competed in the sprint event at the 1988 Summer Olympics.
