= Cayman Islands at the 2004 Summer Olympics =

- Flag of the Cayman Islands
- IOC code: CAY
- NOC: Cayman Islands Olympic Committee
- Website: www.caymanolympic.org.ky

in Athens
- Competitors: 5 in 2 sports
- Flag bearer: Cydonie Mothersill
- Medals: Gold 0 Silver 0 Bronze 0 Total 0

Summer Olympics appearances (overview)
- 1976; 1980; 1984; 1988; 1992; 1996; 2000; 2004; 2008; 2012; 2016; 2020; 2024

The Cayman Islands competed at the 2004 Summer Olympics in Athens, Greece, from 13 to 29 August 2004.

== Athletics ==
Caymanian athletes have so far achieved qualifying standards in the following athletics events (up to a maximum of 3 athletes in each event at the 'A' Standard, and 1 at the 'B' Standard).

Men
Track & road events

Athlete	Event	Heat		Quarterfinal		Semifinal		Final	
Athlete	Event	Result	Rank	Result	Rank	Result	Rank	Result	Rank
Kareem Streete-Thompson	100 m	10.15	2 Q	10.24	5	did not advance			

Field events

Athlete	Event	Qualification		Final	
Athlete	Event	Distance	Position	Distance	Position
Kareem Streete-Thompson	Long jump	7.85	20	did not advance	

Women
Track & road events

Athlete	Event	Heat		Quarterfinal		Semifinal		Final	
Athlete	Event	Result	Rank	Result	Rank	Result	Rank	Result	Rank
Cydonie Mothersill	200 m	22.40 NR	1 Q	22.76	1 Q	22.76	5	did not advance	

Key

- Note–Ranks given for track events are within the athlete's heat only
- Q = Qualified for the next round
- q = Qualified for the next round as a fastest loser or, in field events, by position without achieving the qualifying target
- NR = National record
- N/A = Round not applicable for the event
- Bye = Athlete not required to compete in round

== Swimming ==
Men

Athlete	Event	Heat		Semifinal		Final	
Athlete	Event	Time	Rank	Time	Rank	Time	Rank
Shaune Fraser	200 m freestyle	1:53.19	41	did not advance			
Andrew Mackay	200 m individual medley	2:07.65	41	did not advance			
Andrew Mackay	400 m individual medley	4:32.38	33	—N/a		did not advance	

Women

Athlete	Event	Heat		Semifinal		Final	
Athlete	Event	Time	Rank	Time	Rank	Time	Rank
Heather Roffey	800 m freestyle	9:02.88	25	—N/a		did not advance	
Heather Roffey	200 m butterfly	2:19.34	30	did not advance			

== See also ==
- Cayman Islands at the 2003 Pan American Games
