= Ira Fabian =

Antiguan cyclist

Personal information
- Born: 3 June 1964 (age 62)

Cycling career
- Sport: Cycling

Charles Ira Fabian (born 3 June 1964) is an Antiguan former cyclist. He competed in the sprint event at the 1988 Summer Olympics.
