= Cayman Islands at the 2012 Summer Olympics =

- Flag of the Cayman Islands
- IOC code: CAY
- NOC: Cayman Islands Olympic Committee
- Website: www.caymanolympic.org.ky

in London
- Competitors: 5 in 2 sports
- Flag bearers: Kemar Hyman (opening); Ronald Forbes (closing)
- Medals: Gold 0 Silver 0 Bronze 0 Total 0

Summer Olympics appearances (overview)
- 1976; 1980; 1984; 1988; 1992; 1996; 2000; 2004; 2008; 2012; 2016; 2020; 2024; 2028

Cayman Islands competed at the 2012 Summer Olympics in London, United Kingdom from 27 July to 12 August 2012. This was the nation's ninth appearance at the Olympics, except the 1980 Summer Olympics in Moscow due to the United States-led boycott.

Five athletes from the Cayman Islands were selected to the team, participating only in athletics and swimming. Sprinter Kemar Hyman was the only athlete to compete at his first Olympics. Veteran sprinter Cydonie Mothersill, on the other hand, became the only female and the oldest athlete of the team, competing at her fifth Olympics. Swimmer Brett Fraser, and his brother Shaune advanced past the first round in the men's 100 m freestyle for the first time, since its swimming team began competing in 2004. Kemar Hyman carried the flag in the opening ceremony and Ronald Forbes was the flag bearer in the closing ceremony.

== Athletics ==
Athletes from the Cayman Islands have so far achieved qualifying standards in the following athletics events (up to a maximum of 3 athletes in each event at the 'A' Standard, and 1 at the 'B' Standard):

Key

- Note – Ranks given for track events are within the athlete's heat only
- Q = Qualified for the next round
- q = Qualified for the next round as a fastest loser or, in field events, by position without achieving the qualifying target
- NR = National record
- N/A = Round not applicable for the event
- Bye = Athlete not required to compete in round

Men

Athlete	Event	Heat		Quarterfinal		Semifinal		Final	
Athlete	Event	Result	Rank	Result	Rank	Result	Rank	Result	Rank
Ronald Forbes	110 m hurdles	14.21	8	—N/a		Did not advance			
Kemar Hyman	100 m	Bye		10.16	4 q	DNS		Did not advance	

Women

Athlete	Event	Heat		Semifinal		Final	
Athlete	Event	Result	Rank	Result	Rank	Result	Rank
Cydonie Mothersill	200 m	DNS		Did not advance			

== Swimming ==
Men

Athlete	Event	Heat		Semifinal		Final	
Athlete	Event	Time	Rank	Time	Rank	Time	Rank
Brett Fraser	50 m freestyle	22.91	32	Did not advance			
Brett Fraser	100 m freestyle	48.54	6 Q	48.92	15	Did not advance	
Brett Fraser	200 m freestyle	1:47.74	14 Q	1:47.01	12	Did not advance	
Shaune Fraser	100 m freestyle	48.99	16 Q	49.07	16	Did not advance	
Shaune Fraser	200 m freestyle	1:48.53	20	Did not advance			

== See also ==
- Cayman Islands at the 2011 Pan American Games
- Cayman Islands at the 2012 Winter Youth Olympics
