= Cayman Islands at the 2020 Summer Olympics =

- Flag of the Cayman Islands
- IOC code: CAY
- NOC: Cayman Islands Olympic Committee
- Website: www.caymanolympic.org.ky

in Tokyo, Japan July 23 – August 8, 2021
- Competitors: 5 in 3 sports
- Flag bearers: Jillian Crooks; Brett Fraser
- Medals: Gold 0 Silver 0 Bronze 0 Total 0

Summer Olympics appearances (overview)
- 1976; 1980; 1984; 1988; 1992; 1996; 2000; 2004; 2008; 2012; 2016; 2020; 2024

The Cayman Islands competed at the 2020 Summer Olympics in Tokyo, Japan, from 23 July to 8 August 2021. It was the nation's eleventh appearance at the Summer Olympics, since its debut at the 1976 Summer Olympics in Montreal. The Cayman Islands delegation consisted of five athletes competing in three sports, and did not win any medals at the Games.

== Background ==
The Cayman Islands Olympic Committee was founded in 1973 and recognized by the International Olympic Committee in 1976. The nation made its first Olympic appearance at the 1976 Summer Olympics in Montreal. It was the nation's eleventh appearance at the Summer Olympics. The Cayman Islands has never won an Olympic medal previously.

The 2020 Summer Olympics were held in Tokyo, Japan, between 23 July and 8 August 2021. Originally scheduled to take place from 24 July to 9 August 2020, the Games were postponed due to the COVID-19 pandemic. For the first time, the International Olympic Committee invited each National Olympic Committee to select one female and one male athlete to jointly carry their flag during the opening ceremony. Swimmers Jillian Crooks and Brett Fraser served as the flag-bearers at the opening ceremony. No Cayman Islands athlete was present at the closing ceremony. None of the five athletes won a medal at the Games.

== Competitors ==
The Cayman Islands delegation consisted of sprinter Kemar Hyman and sprinter Shalysa Wray in athletics, swimmers Brett Fraser and Jillian Crooks in swimming, and gymnast Raegan Rutty in gymnastics.

Sport	Men	Women	Total
Athletics	1	1	2
Gymnastics	0	1	1
Swimming	1	1	2
Total	2	3	5

== Athletics ==
As per the governing body World Athletics (WA), a NOC was allowed to enter up to three qualified athletes in each individual event if the Olympic Qualifying Standards (OQS) for the respective events had been met during the qualifying period. The remaining places were allocated based on the World Athletics Rankings which were derived from the average of the best five results for an athlete over the designated qualifying period, weighted by the importance of the meet. Virgin Islands received a universality slot from the WA to send a male track and field athlete to the Olympics. Kemar Hyman qualified for the Games in 2019 after setting a time of 10.02 seconds in the men's 100 meters event at the Johnny Loaring Classic in Canada. Shalysa Wray, received a universality place and made her Olympic debut in the women's 400 meters event.

The athletics events were held at the Japan National Stadium in Tokyo. Hyman finished seventh in his heat in the men's 100 m. He finished with a time of 10.41 seconds, and did not advance to the semifinals, which he later attributed in part to a bout of bronchitis. Wray finished seventh in her heat in the women's 400 m event with a personal best time of 53.61 seconds, but did not advance to the semifinals.

Key

- Note–Ranks given for track events are within the athlete's heat only
- Q = Qualified for the next round
- q = Qualified for the next round as a fastest loser or, in field events, by position without achieving the qualifying target
- NR = National record
- N/A = Round not applicable for the event
- Bye = Athlete not required to compete in round

Track & road events

Athlete	Event	Heat		Quarterfinal		Semifinal		Final	
Athlete	Event	Result	Rank	Result	Rank	Result	Rank	Result	Rank
Kemar Hyman	Men's 100 m	10.41	7	Did not advance					
Shalysa Wray	Women's 400 m	53.61 PB	7	Did not advance					

== Gymnastics ==
As per the International Gymnastics Federation (FIG), NOCs that have qualified teams were allowed to enter four members the individual events. A maximum of two further places were allocated based on an aggregate of scores achieved over the Artistic Gymnastics World Cup series and the various continental artistic gymnastics championships. Cayman Islands received an invitation from the Tripartite Commission to send a female gymnast to the Games, marking the nation's Olympic debut in the sport. Raegan Rutty became the first Caymanian Olympic gymnast to participate in the Games.

The artistic gymnastics events were held at the Ariake Gymnastics Centre. In the women's artistic individual all-around qualifications, Rutty finished 80th with a total score of 39.615, and did not qualify for the final. She scored 12.133 on floor exercise, 8.566 on uneven bars, 8.283 on balance beam and 10.633 on floor, and was placed 82nd, 87th, and 91st in the respective events.

Women

Athlete	Event	Qualification						Final					
Athlete	Event	Apparatus				Total	Rank	Apparatus				Total	Rank
Athlete	Event	VT	UB	BB	FX	Total	Rank	VT	UB	BB	FX	Total	Rank
Raegan Rutty	All-around	12.133	8.566	8.283	10.633	39.615	80	Did not advance					

== Swimming ==
As per the Fédération internationale de natation (FINA) guidelines, a NOC was permitted to enter a maximum of two qualified athletes in each individual event, who have achieved the Olympic Qualifying Time (OQT). If the quota was not filled, one athlete per event was allowed to enter per NOC, provided they achieved the Olympic Selection Time (OST) in competitions approved by World Aquatics in the period between 1 March 2019 to 27 June 2021. If the overeall quota was not met, FINA allowed NOCs to enter one swimmer per gender under a universality place even if they have not achieved the standard entry times (OQT/OST).

Brett Fraser qualified for the men's 50 m freestyle with a time of 22.54 seconds. This was the third Olympics Games for Fraser, who won the gold medal in the 200 m freestyle event in the 2011 Pan American Games. Jillian Crooks received a universality place to compete in the women's 100 m freestyle event. This was the second consecutive Olympic appearance for Fraser after her debut at the 2016 Summer Olympics, and the debut Olympic appearance for Crooks.

The swimming events were held at the Tokyo Aquatics Centre. Fraser finished third in the third heat with a time of 22.46 seconds. However, he did not advance to the semifinals, after he was ranked 34th amongst the 73 competitors. Crooks finished second in her heat with a time of 57.32 seconds, setting a new national record. However, she did not advance to the semifinals after ranked 41st amongst the 51 competitors.

Athlete	Event	Heats		Semifinals		Final	
Athlete	Event	Time	Rank	Time	Rank	Time	Rank
Brett Fraser	Men's 50 m freestyle	22.46	2	Did not advance			
Jillian Crooks	Women's 100 m freestyle	57.32 NR	2	Did not advance			

== See also ==
- Cayman Islands at the 2016 Summer Olympics
- Cayman Islands at the 2024 Summer Olympics
