= Colin Abrams =

Guyanese/American Olympic cyclist

Colin Winston Abrams
Personal information
- Nickname: Doc
- Born: 14 March 1956 (age 70)

Cycling career
- Sport: Cycling

Dr Colin Winston Abrams (born 14 March 1956) is a Guyanese/American former Olympic cyclist. He competed in the sprint event at the 1988 Summer Olympics.
