= Cayman Islands at the Olympics =

- Flag of the Cayman Islands
- IOC code: CAY
- NOC: Cayman Islands Olympic Committee
- Website: www.caymanolympic.org.ky
- Medals: Gold 0 Silver 0 Bronze 0 Total 0

Summer appearances
- 1976; 1980; 1984; 1988; 1992; 1996; 2000; 2004; 2008; 2012; 2016; 2020; 2024; 2028

Winter appearances
- 2010; 2014; 2018–2026

The Cayman Islands first competed at the Olympic Games in 1976, and has participated in each Summer Olympic Games since then, missing only the 1980 Summer Olympics by participating in the American-led boycott of the 1980 Summer Olympics. The Cayman Islands have yet to win any Olympic medals. Their best finish is 8th, both by sprinter Cydonie Mothersille at the women's 200 meters at the 2008 Summer Olympics, and by swimmer Jordan Crooks at the men's 50 meters freestyle at the 2024 Summer Olympics.

After Jamaican independence in 1962, the Cayman Islands became a separate British Overseas Territory. The Cayman Islands Olympic Committee was formed in 1973 and recognized in 1976.

The Cayman Islands participated at the Winter Olympic Games in 2010 and 2014.

== Medal tables ==
=== Medals by Summer Games ===
Games	Athletes	Gold	Silver	Bronze	Total	Rank
1976 Montreal	2	0	0	0	0	–
1980 Moscow	boycotted					
1984 Los Angeles	8	0	0	0	0	–
1988 Seoul	8	0	0	0	0	–
1992 Barcelona	10	0	0	0	0	–
1996 Atlanta	9	0	0	0	0	–
2000 Sydney	3	0	0	0	0	–
2004 Athens	5	0	0	0	0	–
2008 Beijing	4	0	0	0	0	–
2012 London	5	0	0	0	0	–
2016 Rio de Janeiro	5	0	0	0	0	–
2020 Tokyo	5	0	0	0	0	–
2024 Paris	4	0	0	0	0	–
2028 Los Angeles	future event					
2032 Brisbane	future event					
Total		0	0	0	0	–

=== Medals by Winter Games ===
Games	Athletes	Gold	Silver	Bronze	Total	Rank
2010 Vancouver	1	0	0	0	0	–
2014 Sochi	1	0	0	0	0	–
2018 Pyeongchang	did not participate					
2022 Beijing	did not participate					
2026 Milano Cortina	did not participate					
2030 French Alps	future event					
2034 Utah	future event					
Total		0	0	0	0	–

== See also ==
- List of flag bearers for the Cayman Islands at the Olympics
- Tropical nations at the Winter Olympics
