= Cayman Islands at the 2000 Summer Olympics =

- Flag of the Cayman Islands
- IOC code: CAY
- NOC: Cayman Islands Olympic Committee
- Website: www.caymanolympic.org.ky

in Sydney
- Competitors: 3 (1 man and 2 women) in 2 sports
- Flag bearer: Kareem Streete-Thompson
- Medals: Gold 0 Silver 0 Bronze 0 Total 0

Summer Olympics appearances (overview)
- 1976; 1980; 1984; 1988; 1992; 1996; 2000; 2004; 2008; 2012; 2016; 2020; 2024

The Cayman Islands competed at the 2000 Summer Olympics in Sydney, Australia.

== Competitors ==
The following is the list of number of competitors in the Games.

Sport	Men	Women	Total
Athletics	1	1	2
Sailing	0	1	1
Total	1	2	3

== Results by event ==
=== Athletics ===
Men's Long Jump

- Kareem Streete-Thompson
  1. Qualifying – 7.99 (did not advance)

Women's 100m

- Cydonie Mothersille
  1. Round 1 – 11.38
  2. Round 2 – 11.81 (did not advance)

Women's 200m

- Cydonie Mothersille
  1. Round 1 – 22.78
  2. Round 2 – DNS (did not advance)

=== Sailing ===
Women's Single Handed Dinghy (Europe)

- Tomeka McTaggart
  1. Race 1 – (27)
  2. Race 2 – (27)
  3. Race 3 – 25
  4. Race 4 – 25
  5. Race 5 – 25
  6. Race 6 – 23
  7. Race 7 – 21
  8. Race 8 – 22
  9. Race 9 – 27
  10. Race 10 – 25
  11. Race 11 – 24
  12. Final – 217 (26th place)

== See also ==
- Cayman Islands at the 1999 Pan American Games
