= Cayman Islands at the 2008 Summer Olympics =

- Flag of the Cayman Islands
- IOC code: CAY
- NOC: Cayman Islands Olympic Committee
- Website: www.caymanolympic.org.ky

in Beijing
- Competitors: 4 in 2 sports
- Flag bearer: Ronald Forbes
- Medals: Gold 0 Silver 0 Bronze 0 Total 0

Summer Olympics appearances (overview)
- 1976; 1980; 1984; 1988; 1992; 1996; 2000; 2004; 2008; 2012; 2016; 2020; 2024; 2028

The Cayman Islands sent a delegation to compete at the 2008 Summer Olympics in Beijing, China. The delegation included fifteen people; of the delegation, four athletes participated under the Caymanian flag. In the track and field events was Ronald Forbes, who also served as the Cayman Islands' flag-bearer during the Opening Ceremony and reached quarterfinals in the 110m hurdles, and Cydonie Mothersille, who reached finals and ranked eighth in the 200m dash. Brothers Shaune and Brett Fraser, both swimmers, participated in the 100 and 200m freestyle and in the 200m backstroke, respectively. The Cayman Islands' appearance at the Beijing Olympics marked its ninth appearance since its debut at the 1976 Summer Olympics in Montreal. The Cayman Islands, up to and including Beijing, have yet to medal.

== Background ==
The Cayman Islands first participated in the Olympics when they sent two male athletes to compete in the Montreál 1976 Summer Olympic Games. Between then and Beijing, the Cayman Islands participated in eight Olympic Games, including every summer Olympic competition excluding the Moscow 1980 Summer Olympics. The number of Caymanian athletes participating in Olympic events peaked at the 1992 Summer Olympics in Barcelona with ten athletes, but has since fallen. In the Beijing Olympics, the Cayman Islands sent four athletes—three men and a woman—to participate in two distinct sports. Two athletes progressed to post-preliminary rounds (Ronald Forbes and Cydonie Mothersille) in their events, and Mothersille, ranked eighth in the final round of her event. However, as of and including its participation in Beijing, the Cayman Islands had yet to medal. Ronald Forbes carried the Caymanian flag at ceremonies.

The Cayman Islands Olympic Committee financed the participation of Brett Fraser in swim meets to prepare for the Beijing Olympics. Runner Cydonie Mothersill and swimmer Shaune Fraser were recipients of the Beijing Olympic Scholarship, which was awarded by the International Olympic Committee and paid for their training expenses. The Caymanian Olympic delegation received donations from the Cayman Islands Post Office, Atlantic Star, Ltd, and its director, Fahad Al Rashid, in addition to sponsorships that the athletes garnered. In addition to the athletes, the delegation to Beijing included eleven people. Among the rest of the delegation was CIOC president Donald McLean, athletics coach Kendrick Williams, swimming coaches Dominic Ross and Mark Block, and past president Jerris Miller.

In addition to the actual Olympic delegation, the Cayman Islands sent two 17-year-old athletes—Courtney Stafford, a squash player, and Joseph Jackson, a sailor—to attend the Olympic Youth Camp in Beijing and witness the opening ceremony, torch relay, and various Olympic events.

== Athletics ==
Men

Former Florida International University athlete Ronald Forbes participated in the men's 110 meters hurdles event on behalf of the Cayman Islands. His participation in the Beijing Olympics marked his debut at the Olympic Games. Forbes' qualification in the hurdle event made him the first British Virgin Islander to participate in Olympic hurdling. While at the Olympics, Forbes was placed in Heat 3 of the 17 August first round in the event against, among others, Colombia's Paulo Villar and Barbadian Ryan Brathwaite, who scored first and second in the heat. Forbes ranked fifth out of eight with a time of 13.59 seconds; he was 0.06 seconds behind China's Shi Dongpeng and 0.13 seconds ahead of Puerto Rico's Hector Cotto Gonzalez. Overall, Forbes tied Russia's Igor Peremota for 19th place out of 43 athletes. He progressed to the second round on 19 August, where he was placed in Heat 4 against France's Ladji Doucouré and American David Oliver. He again ranked fifth out of eight with a time of 13.72 seconds. Overall, Forbes ranked 26th out of 32 athletes, and did not progress to semifinals.

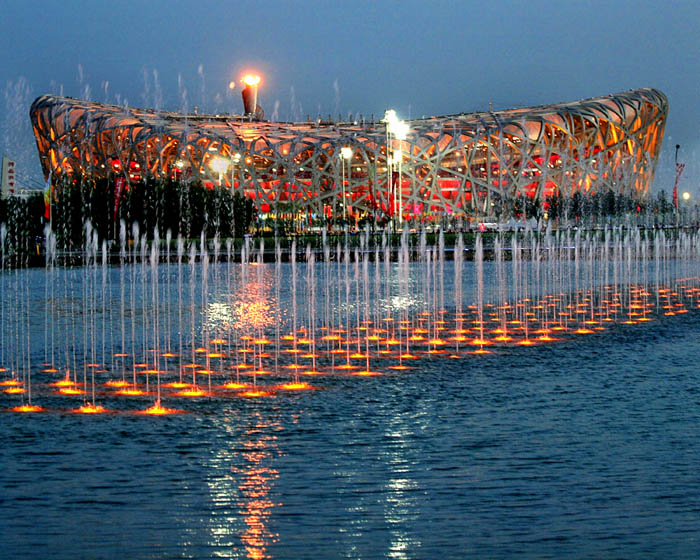
The Beijing National Stadium, where athletic events during the 2008 Olympics took place.

Athlete	Event	Heat		Quarterfinal		Semifinal		Final	
Athlete	Event	Result	Rank	Result	Rank	Result	Rank	Result	Rank
Ronald Forbes	110 m hurdles	13.59	5 Q	13.72	5	Did not advance			

Women

Jamaica-born former Clemson University athlete Cydonie Mothersill qualified for the women's 200 meter dash and participated on behalf of the Cayman Islands. 30 years old at the time of the Beijing Olympics, Mothersill had been participating in the Olympics since she was 18 at the 1996 Summer Olympics in Atlanta. She also attended the 2000 Summer Olympics in Sydney and the 2004 Summer Olympics in Athens, but only started running her present event in Sydney. In Beijing, Mothersill participated in the first round of her event on 18 August, where she was placed in Heat 1 versus the United States' Muna Lee and France's Muriel Hurtis-Houari. Mothersill ranked third in the heat with a time of 22.76 seconds, placing behind Hurtis-Houari by 0.04 seconds. Overall, Mothersill ranked third in the event out of 48 athletes, behind Lee and Hurtis-Houari. She progressed to the 19 August second round and was placed in Heat 1, which included Jamaica's Veronica Campbell and the Bahamas' Debbie Ferguson. Mothersill ranked fourth of eight, earning a time of 22.83 seconds. She fell behind Ferguson by 0.06 seconds, and placed ahead of fifth place heat finalist Ionela Târlea of Romania by 0.29 seconds. Cydonie Mothersill tied Muna Lee in Round 2 for ninth place out of 32 athletes. Mothersill qualified for semifinals on 20 August, and was placed in Heat 2. Mothersill ranked fourth out of eight, this time running the event in 22.61 seconds and falling behind Jamaican Sherone Simpson and American Marshevet Hooker by 0.11 seconds, but beating Hurtis-Houari by 0.1 seconds. Mothersill ranked ninth in the event out of sixteen. During the final races, Mothersill ran the event in 22.68 seconds, and ranked eighth overall.

Athlete	Event	Heat		Quarterfinal		Semifinal		Final	
Athlete	Event	Result	Rank	Result	Rank	Result	Rank	Result	Rank
Cydonie Mothersille	200 m	22.76	3 Q	22.83	4 Q	22.61 SB	4 Q	22.68	8

Key

- Note–Ranks given for track events are within the athlete's heat only
- Q = Qualified for the next round
- q = Qualified for the next round as a fastest loser or, in field events, by position without achieving the qualifying target
- NR = National record
- N/A = Round not applicable for the event
- Bye = Athlete not required to compete in round

== Swimming ==
Then-University of Florida student Brett Fraser was the youngest participant in the Caymanian delegation during the Beijing Olympics, at age 18. He swam for the Cayman Islands alongside his brother, Shaune Fraser, although Brett Fraser specifically qualified for the Men's 200 meter backstroke event. Brett Fraser's participation in the Beijing Olympics marked the first time he participated in any Olympic Games. During the Olympics themselves, Fraser was placed in Heat 1 during the 13 August preliminary round, where he challenged two other athletes: Oleg Rabota of Kazakhstan, and Sergey Pankov of Uzbekistan. Fraser completed his event with a time of 2:01.17, placing him 0.78 seconds ahead of second-place heat finalist Rabota, and almost two seconds ahead of third-place heat finalist Pankov. Fraser lead his heat, but ranked 29th place out of 42 athletes overall, falling approximately five seconds behind round leader Ryan Lochte of the United States, who later medaled gold in the event. Brett Fraser did not progress to the next round.

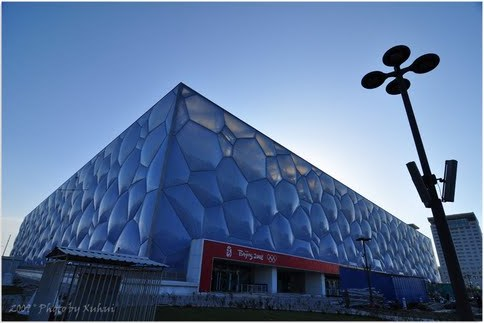
The "Water Cube", where swimming events took place during the 2008 Olympics

Former University of Florida student Shaune Fraser, elder brother of Brett Fraser, also participated in swimming events at Beijing. The Olympic Games in Beijing marked the second appearance by Shaune Fraser, who appeared before in the 2004 Summer Olympics in Athens when he was 16 years old. Fraser qualified for three events in Beijing: the 100 meters freestyle, the 200 meters freestyle, and the 100 meters butterfly. He previously participated in the 200 meters freestyle in Athens. In the 200 meters freestyle, Fraser participated in Heat 5 during the 10 August preliminaries. Other swimmers in his heat were Israel's Nimrod Shapira Bar-Or and South Africa's Darian Townsend, who respectively ranked first and second in the heat, while Fraser ranked fifth out of eight athletes with a time of 1:48.60. Fraser ranked behind Japan's Sho Uchida by 0.26 seconds, and ahead of Greece's Andreas Zisimos by 0.22 seconds. Overall, Fraser ranked 26th out of 58 athletes. He did not progress to the semifinals in the event. In the 100 meters freestyle, Fraser participated in Heat 5 during the 12 August preliminary rounds. He swam against athletes including the Czech Republic's Martin Verner and Hungary's Balazs Makany, and completed the event in 49.56 seconds. Fraser placed fourth out of eight athletes, placing between Uruguay's Martin Kutscher (5th place, 50.08 seconds) and Balazs and Lithuania's Paulius Viktoravicius (tied for 2nd place, 49.27 seconds). Overall, Fraser tied Yuriy Yegoshin for 36th place out of 64 athletes. He did not advance to semifinals. Lastly, in the 100 meters butterfly, Shaune Fraser participated in Heat 2 of the 14 August preliminary rounds. He competed against, among others, Malaysia's Daniel Bego and Suriname's Gordon Touw Ngie Tjouw. Fraser ranked first in the heat out of seven athletes with a time of 54.08 seconds. Bego, the second-place heat finalist, was 0.3 seconds behind him. Overall, Fraser ranked 51st out of 66 athletes, and did not progress to the semifinal round.

Men

Athlete	Event	Heat		Semifinal		Final	
Athlete	Event	Time	Rank	Time	Rank	Time	Rank
Brett Fraser	200 m backstroke	2:01.17	29	Did not advance			
Shaune Fraser	100 m freestyle	49.56	36	Did not advance			
Shaune Fraser	200 m freestyle	1:48.60	26	Did not advance			
Shaune Fraser	100 m butterfly	53.08	51	Did not advance			

== See also ==
- Cayman Islands at the 2007 Pan American Games
- Cayman Islands at the 2010 Central American and Caribbean Games
