= Clive Saney =

Trinidad and Tobago cyclist

Personal information
- Born: 2 July 1948 (age 78)

Cycling career
- Sport: Cycling

Clive Saney (born 2 July 1948) is a former Trinidad cyclist. He competed in three events at the 1972 Summer Olympics.
