= Mario Pons =

Ecuadorian cyclist

Nelson Mario Pons Seelig
Personal information
- Born: 18 December 1967 (age 58) Buenos Aires, Argentina

Cycling career
- Sport: Cycling

Nelson Mario Pons Seelig (born 18 December 1967) is an Ecuadorian former cyclist. He competed at the 1988 Summer Olympics and the 1992 Summer Olympics.
