= Florence Allan =

Caymanian sailor (born 1998)

Personal information
- Nationality: Cayman Islands
- Born: 26 May 1998 (age 28)

Sport
- Sport: Sailing

Florence D. Allan (born 26 May 1998) is a Cayman Islands competitive sailor.

She competed at the 2016 Summer Olympics in Rio de Janeiro, in the women's Laser Radial, where she finished in 36th place. Allan was the first Olympic sailor to compete for the Cayman Islands in 16 years.
