= Paul Hurlston =

Caymanian javelin thrower (born 1966)

Personal information
- Born: 12 January 1966 (age 59) Cayman Islands
- Height: 188 cm (6 ft 2 in)
- Weight: 82 kg (181 lb)

Sport
- Country: Cayman Islands
- Sport: Javelin throw

Paul Hurlston is a Caymanian Olympic javelin thrower. He represented his country in the men's javelin throw at the 1988 Summer Olympics. His distance was a 62.34.
