= Cayman Islands at the 1984 Summer Olympics =

- Flag of the Cayman Islands
- IOC code: CAY
- NOC: Cayman Islands Olympic Committee

in Los Angeles
- Competitors: 8 (7 men and 1 woman) in 2 sports
- Flag bearer: Carson Ebanks
- Medals: Gold 0 Silver 0 Bronze 0 Total 0

Summer Olympics appearances (overview)
- 1976; 1980; 1984; 1988; 1992; 1996; 2000; 2004; 2008; 2012; 2016; 2020; 2024

The Cayman Islands competed at the 1984 Summer Olympics in Los Angeles, United States. The nation returned to the Olympic Games after participating in the American-led boycott of the 1980 Summer Olympics. Eight competitors, seven men and one woman, took part in seven events in two sports.

== Cycling ==
Men's individual road race

- David Dibben – did not finish (→ no ranking)
- Alfred Ebanks – did not finish (→ no ranking)
- Craig Merren – did not finish (→ no ranking)
- Aldyn Wint – did not finish (→ no ranking)

Team time trial

- David Dibben
- Alfred Ebanks
- Craig Merren
- Aldyn Wint

Sprint

- Ernest Moodie

1000m time trial

- Ernest Moodie

Points race

- Ernest Moodie

Women's individual road race

- Merilyn Phillips – did not finish (→ no ranking) Merilyn is the sister of Craig Merren. She was the first woman cyclist and Olympian for the Cayman Islands.
