= Patrick Gellineau =

Trinidad cyclist

Personal information
- Born: 3 September 1951 (age 75) Port of Spain, Trinidad and Tobago

Cycling career
- Sport: Cycling

Patrick Gellineau (born 3 September 1951) is a former Trinidad cyclist. He competed in three events at the 1972 Summer Olympics.
