= Frank Weber =

German cyclist

Personal information
- Born: 12 March 1963 (age 63) Bielefeld, West Germany

Cycling career
- Sport: Cycling

Frank Weber (born 12 March 1963) is a German former cyclist. He competed in the sprint event at the 1988 Summer Olympics.
