= Nikolai Kovsh =

Soviet cyclist

Personal information
- Born: 22 January 1965 (age 61) Moscow, Soviet Union

Cycling career
- Sport: Cycling
Medal record
Men's cycling
Representing Soviet Union
Olympic Games
Silver medal – second place	1988 Seoul	Sprint
World Championships (Amateur)
Bronze medal – third place	1989 Lyon	Sprint

Nikolai Kovsh (born 22 January 1965) is a cyclist from Soviet Union. He competed for the Soviet Union in the 1988 Summer Olympics held in Seoul, South Korea in the individual sprint event where he finished in second place. He also competed for the Unified Team at the 1992 Summer Olympics.
