= Bailón Becerra =

Bolivian cyclist (born 1966)

Personal information
- Born: 15 June 1966 (age 60) Montero, Bolivia

Cycling career
- Sport: Cycling

Bailón Becerra (born 15 June 1966) is a Bolivian former cyclist. He competed in three events at the 1988 Summer Olympics.
