= Peter Milburn =

Caymanian sailor

Personal information
- Nationality: Caymanian
- Born: 25 January 1945 (age 81)

Sport
- Sport: Sailing

Achievements and titles
- Olympic finals: 1976 Summer Olympics

Peter Milburn (born 25 January 1945) is a Caymanian sailor. He competed in the 470 event at the 1976 Summer Olympics.
