= Cayman Islands at the 1992 Summer Olympics =

- Flag of the Cayman Islands
- IOC code: CAY
- NOC: Cayman Islands Olympic Committee

in Barcelona
- Competitors: 10 (10 men and 0 women) in 3 sports
- Medals: Gold 0 Silver 0 Bronze 0 Total 0

Summer Olympics appearances (overview)
- 1976; 1980; 1984; 1988; 1992; 1996; 2000; 2004; 2008; 2012; 2016; 2020; 2024

The Cayman Islands competed at the 1992 Summer Olympics in Barcelona, Spain. Ten competitors, all men, took part in seven events in three sports.

== Competitors ==
The following is the list of number of competitors in the Games.

Sport	Men	Women	Total
Athletics	1	0	1
Cycling	6	0	6
Sailing	3	0	3
Total	10	0	10

== Athletics ==
Men's 100m metres

- Kareem Streete-Thompson
  - Heat – 10.78 (→ did not advance)

Men's Long Jump

- Kareem Streete-Thompson
  - Qualification – 7.39 m (→ did not advance)

== Cycling ==
Six cyclists represented the Cayman Islands in 1992.

Men's road race

- Dennis Brooks
- Michele Smith
- Stefan Baraud

Men's team time trial

- Alfred Ebanks
- Don Campbell
- Craig Merren
- Stefan Baraud

Men's 1 km time trial

- Don Campbell

== See also ==
- Cayman Islands at the 1991 Pan American Games
