= Hideki Miwa =

Japanese cyclist

Personal information
- Born: 13 March 1969 (age 57) Yasu, Shiga, Japan

Cycling career
- Sport: Cycling

Hideki Miwa (三和 英樹, Miwa Hideki; born 13 March 1969) is a Japanese former cyclist. He competed in the sprint event at the 1988 Summer Olympics. He won the gold medal in the men's sprint at the 1990 Asian Games. He later became a professional keirin cyclist, accumulating more than 300 wins.
