= Gerry Kirkconnell =

Caymanian sailor

Personal information
- Nationality: Caymanian
- Born: 15 February 1958 (age 67)

Sport
- Sport: Sailing

Gerry Kirkconnell (born 15 February 1958) is a Caymanian sailor. He competed in the 470 event at the 1976 Summer Olympics.
