= Ronald Cassidy =

Trinidad cyclist

Personal information
- Born: 3 February 1939
- Died: 5 December 2020 (aged 81)

Cycling career
- Sport: Cycling

Ronald Cassidy (3 February 1939 – 5 December 2020) was a Trinidad cyclist. He competed in the individual pursuit at the 1964 Summer Olympics.
