= David Farfan =

Trinidad and Tobago sailor

Personal information
- Nationality: Trinidad and Tobago
- Born: 10 May 1936

Sport
- Sport: Sailing

Achievements and titles
- Olympic finals: 1972 Summer Olympics

David Farfan (10 May 1936 – before May 2009) was a Trinidad and Tobago sailor. He competed in the Flying Dutchman event at the 1972 Summer Olympics.
