= Richard Bennett (sailor) =

Trinidad and Tobago sailor (1932–2011)

Personal information
- Full name: Richard John Bennett
- Nationality: Trinidad and Tobago
- Born: 16 February 1932; Port of Spain, Trinidad and Tobago
- Died: 17 June 2011 (aged 79); Port of Spain, Trinidad and Tobago
- Height: 180 cm (5 ft 11 in)
- Weight: 70 kg (154 lb; 11 st 0 lb)
- Spouse: Margaret Bennett (unknown - 2011)

Sport
- Sport: Sailing

Richard John Bennett (16 February 1932 – 17 June 2011) was a Trinidad and Tobago sailor. He competed in the Flying Dutchman event at the 1960 Summer Olympics, representing the West Indies Federation. He also competed at the 1972 Summer Olympics, for Trinidad and Tobago. Bennett died in Port of Spain on 17 June 2011, at the age of 79.
