= Paul Réneau =

Belizean sprinter

Personal information
- Born: 28 September 1960 (age 65)

Sport
- Sport: Sprinting, cycling

Paul Réneau (born 28 September 1960) is a Belizean former athlete. He competed as a sprinter at the 1984 Summer Olympics and as a cyclist at the 1988 Summer Olympics.
