= Geoffrey Ferreira =

Trinidad and Tobago swimmer (born 1949)

Personal information
- Born: 1 November 1949 (age 76) Port of Spain, Trinidad and Tobago

Sport
- Sport: Swimming

Geoffrey Ferreira (born 1 November 1949) is a Trinidad and Tobago former swimmer. He competed at the 1968 Summer Olympics and the 1972 Summer Olympics.
