= Erik Schoefs =

Belgian cyclist

Personal information
- Born: 4 January 1967 (age 59) Tongeren, Belgium

Cycling career
- Sport: Cycling
- Current team: Retired
- Discipline: Track
- Role: Rider
- Rider type: Sprinter
Medal record
Men's track cycling
Representing Belgium
World Championships
Bronze medal – third place	1992 Valencia	Sprint

Erik Schoefs (born 4 January 1967) is a Belgian former track cyclist. He competed at the 1988 Summer Olympics and the 1992 Summer Olympics. He also acted as a pacesetter during his sporting career.
