= Maxwell Cheeseman =

Trinidadian Cyclist

Personal information
- Born: 18 June 1962 (age 64) San Fernando, Trinidad and Tobago

Cycling career
- Sport: Cycling

Maxwell Cheeseman (born 18 June 1962) is a Trinidad and Tobago former cyclist. He competed at the 1988 Summer Olympics and the 1992 Summer Olympics.
