= Gene Samuel =

Trinidad and Tobago cyclist

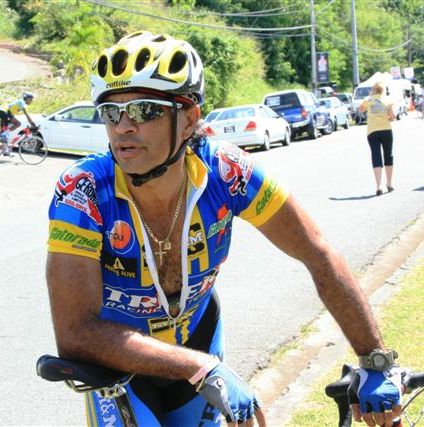

Personal information
- Nickname: G.E. “Good Egg”
- Born: 15 October 1960 (age 66) Trinidad and Tobago

Cycling career
- Sport: Cycling
Medal record
Men's cycling
Representing Trinidad and Tobago
Pan American Games
Gold medal – first place	1991 Havana	1.000m Time Trial
Silver medal – second place	1987 Indianapolis	1.000m Time Trial
Bronze medal – third place	1995 Mar del Plata	1.000m Time Trial

Eugene "Gene” Samuel (born October 15, 1960) is a semi-retired track cyclist and road cyclist from Trinidad and Tobago, who represented his native country at four consecutive Summer Olympics, starting in 1984 where he placed fourth, missing the bronze medal by 4/100ths of a second. He won a gold, a silver and a bronze medal in the Men's 1,000m Time Trial at three different Pan American Games. Samuel is a well-known bunch race track cyclist for his never-say-die competitive attitude and his warrior spirit, hence his nickname, "Geronimo". He broke the World Professional record in the 1000 metre time-trial in Cali, Colombia, in 1992. He was a World Champion bronze medallist in the 1000 metre time trial in 1991 at the World Championships in Stuttgart, Germany, a few days after winning the gold medal at the Pan American Games and breaking the track record in Havana, Cuba. He won double gold medals at the 1986 CAC Games in Santo Domingo and broke the 1000m track record in the process. He has three times been Sportsman of the Year in Trinidad and Tobago and also was inducted into the Sports Hall of Fame in 2000.

He was awarded the National Award of the Chaconia Silver Medal for long and meritorious service to country in sport. He was named as one of the top 100 sportsmen in the 20th century for Trinidad and Tobago. He was named as one of the top 50 Legends in Sport for the 50th Independence Celebrations in Trinidad and Tobago. He has won an unprecedented over 65 Elite National Championship Track Champion Titles.

He owns and manages a cycling shop in Woodbrook, Port of Spain, called Geronimo's Cycle & Sport Ltd., and coaches a local cycling team.

On August 26, 2011 Samuel was inducted into the Trexlertown Velodrome ("T-Town") Hall of Fame in Trexlertown, Pennsylvania, in the United States.

He is of Portuguese-Trinidadian descent.

Olympic Games
Preceded by Alvin Daniel	Flagbearer for Trinidad and Tobago; Atlanta 1996	Succeeded by Ato Boldon
