= Trinidad and Tobago Olympic Committee =

National Olympic Committee

- Country: Trinidad and Tobago
- Code: TTO
- Created: 1946
- Recognized: 1947
- Continental Association: PASO
- Headquarters: Port of Spain, Trinidad and Tobago
- President: Diane Henderson
- Secretary General: Annette Knott
- Website: www.ttoc.org

The Trinidad and Tobago Olympic Committee (IOC code: TTO) is the National Olympic Committee representing Trinidad and Tobago. It is also the body responsible for Trinidad and Tobago's representation at the Commonwealth Games.

== See also ==
- Trinidad and Tobago at the Olympics
- Trinidad and Tobago at the Commonwealth Games
- National Association of Athletics Administrations of Trinidad & Tobago
- Sport in Trinidad and Tobago
