= 2026 Winter Olympics closing ceremony flag bearers =

During the closing ceremony of the 2026 Winter Olympics in Milan and Cortina d'Ampezzo, Italy the flag bearers of 91 National Olympic Committees (NOCs) arrived into Verona Arena in Verona, Italy on 22 February. The flag bearers from each participating country entered the stadium informally in single file, and behind them marched all the athletes. The flags of each country were not necessarily carried by the same flag bearer as in the opening ceremony.

The parade order was identical to the opening ceremony's Parade of Nations.

== List ==
The following is a list of each country's flag bearer. The list is sorted by the sequence that each nation appeared in the parade of nations. The names are given in their official designations by the IOC, and the Italian names follow their official designations by the Milano Cortina Organizing Committee for the Olympic Games.

Order	Nation	Italian	Flag bearer	Sport	Ref.
1	Greece	Grecia	Maria Eleni Tsiovolou	Alpine skiing	
2	Albania	Albania	Volunteer		
3	Andorra	Andorra	Volunteer		
4	Saudi Arabia	Arabia Saudita	Volunteer		
5	Argentina	Argentina	Franco Dal Farra	Cross-country skiing	
5	Argentina	Argentina	Verónica Ravenna	Luge	
6	Armenia	Armenia	Volunteer		
7	Australia	Australia	Danielle Scott	Freestyle skiing	
7	Australia	Australia	Cooper Woods	Freestyle skiing	
8	Austria	Austria	Janine Flock	Skeleton	
8	Austria	Austria	Alessandro Hämmerle	Snowboarding	
9	Azerbaijan	Azerbaigian	Volunteer		
10	Belgium	Belgio	Tineke den Dulk	Short-track speed skating	
10	Belgium	Belgio	Ward Pétré	Short-track speed skating	
11	Benin	Benin	Nathan Tchibozo	Alpine skiing	
12	Bolivia	Bolivia	Timo Juhani Grönlund	Cross-country skiing	
13	Bosnia and Herzegovina	Bosnia Erzegovina	Volunteer		
14	Brazil	Brasile	Edson Bindilatti	Bobsleigh	
15	Bulgaria	Bulgaria	Lora Hristova	Biathlon	
16	Canada	Canada	Steven Dubois	Short-track speed skating	
16	Canada	Canada	Valérie Maltais	Speed skating	
17	Czech Republic	Cechia	Metoděj Jílek	Speed skating	
17	Czech Republic	Cechia	Martina Sáblíková	Speed skating	
18	Chile	Cile	Stephanie Joffroy	Freestyle skiing	
19	China	Repubblica Popolare Cinese	Su Yiming	Snowboarding	
20	Cyprus	Cipro	Yianno Kouyoumdjian	Alpine skiing	
21	Colombia	Colombia	Volunteer		
22	South Korea	Repubblica di Corea	Hwang Daeheon	Short-track speed skating	
22	South Korea	Repubblica di Corea	Choi Minjeong	Short-track speed skating	
23	Croatia	Croazia	Tena Hadžić	Cross-country skiing	
23	Croatia	Croazia	Marko Skender	Cross-country skiing	
24	Denmark	Danimarca	Anne Bunemann de Besche	Biathlon	
24	Denmark	Danimarca	Viktor Hald Thorup	Speed skating	
25	Ecuador	Ecuador	Volunteer		
26	United Arab Emirates	Emirati Arabi Uniti	Alexander Astridge	Alpine skiing	
26	United Arab Emirates	Emirati Arabi Uniti	Piera Hudson	Alpine skiing	
27	Eritrea	Eritrea	Shannon Abeda	Alpine skiing	
28	Estonia	Estonia	Marten Liiv	Speed skating	
28	Estonia	Estonia	Niina Petrõkina	Figure skating	
29	Philippines	Filippine	Francis Ceccarelli	Alpine skiing	
29	Philippines	Filippine	Tallulah Proulx	Alpine skiing	
30	Finland	Finlandia	Iida Karhunen	Figure skating	
31	Georgia	Georgia	Luka Berulava	Figure skating	
31	Georgia	Georgia	Nino Tsiklauri	Alpine skiing	
32	Germany	Germania	Tobias Arlt	Luge	
32	Germany	Germania	Tobias Wendl	Luge	
33	Jamaica	Giamaica	Volunteer		
34	Japan	Giappone	Kaori Sakamoto	Figure skating	
34	Japan	Giappone	Wataru Morishige	Speed skating	
35	Great Britain	Gran Bretagna	Charlotte Bankes	Snowboarding	
35	Great Britain	Gran Bretagna	Matt Weston	Skeleton	
36	Guinea-Bissau	Guinea-Bissau	Winston Tang	Alpine skiing	
37	Haiti	Haiti	Richardson Viano	Alpine skiing	
38	Hong Kong	Hong Kong, Cina	Volunteer		
39	India	India	Stanzin Lundup	Cross-country skiing	
40	Iran	Repubblica Islamica dell'Iran	Sadaf Savehshemshaki	Alpine skiing	
41	Ireland	Irlanda	Benjamin Lynch	Freestyle skiing	
42	Iceland	Islanda	Dagur Benediktsson	Cross-country skiing	
43	Israel	Israele	Barnabas Szollos	Alpine skiing	
44	Kazakhstan	Kazakistan	Mikhail Shaidorov	Figure skating	
45	Kenya	Kenya	Issa Gachingiri Laborde Dit Pere	Alpine skiing	
46	Kosovo	Kosovo	Drin Kokaj	Alpine skiing	
47	Kyrgyzstan	Kyrgyzstan	Volunteer		
48	Latvia	Lettonia	Patrīcija Eiduka	Cross-country skiing	
48	Latvia	Lettonia	Roberts Kruzbergs	Short-track speed skating	
49	Lebanon	Libano	Samer Tawk	Cross-country skiing	
50	Liechtenstein	Liechtenstein	Volunteer		
51	Lithuania	Lituania	Modestas Vaičiulis	Cross-country skiing	
51	Lithuania	Lituania	Meda Variakojytė	Figure skating	
52	Luxembourg	Lussemburgo	Matthieu Osch	Alpine skiing	
53	North Macedonia	Macedonia del Nord	Volunteer		
54	Madagascar	Madagascar	Mialitiana Clerc	Alpine skiing	
54	Madagascar	Madagascar	Mathieu Gravier	Alpine skiing	
55	Malaysia	Malaysia	Aruwin Salehhuddin	Alpine skiing	
56	Malta	Malta	Volunteer		
57	Morocco	Marocco	Volunteer		
58	Mexico	Messico	Donovan Carrillo	Figure skating	
58	Mexico	Messico	Sarah Schleper	Alpine skiing	
59	Moldova	Repubblica di Moldova	Iulian Luchin	Cross-country skiing	
60	Monaco	Monaco	Volunteer		
61	Mongolia	Mongolia	Batmonkh Achbadrakh	Cross-country skiing	
61	Mongolia	Mongolia	Enkhbayar Ariuntungalag	Cross-country skiing	
62	Montenegro	Montenegro	Volunteer		
63	Nigeria	Nigeria	Samuel Ikpefan	Cross-country skiing	
64	Norway	Norvegia	Johannes Hoesflot Klaebo	Cross-country skiing	
64	Norway	Norvegia	Aurora Grinden Løvås	Speed skating	
65	New Zealand	Nuova Zelanda	Luca Harrington	Freestyle skiing	
66	Netherlands	Paesi Bassi	Jorrit Bergsma	Speed skating	
66	Netherlands	Paesi Bassi	Xandra Velzeboer	Short-track speed skating	
67	Pakistan	Pakistan	Muhammad Karim	Alpine skiing	
68	Poland	Polonia	Vladimir Semirunniy	Speed skating	
68	Poland	Polonia	Gabriela Topolska	Short-track speed skating	
69	Puerto Rico	Porto Rico	Volunteer		
70	Portugal	Portogallo	José Cabeça	Cross-country skiing	
71	Romania	Romania	Julia Sauter	Figure skating	
72	San Marino	San Marino	Rafael Mini	Alpine skiing	
73	Serbia	Serbia	Volunteer		
74	Singapore	Singapore	Faiz Basha	Alpine skiing	
75	Slovakia	Slovacchia	Rebeka Cully	Ski mountaineering	
75	Slovakia	Slovacchia	Jakub Siarnik	Ski mountaineering	
76	Slovenia	Slovenia	Lila Grace Lapanja	Alpine skiing	
77	Spain	Spagna	Ana Alonso Rodriguez	Ski mountaineering	
77	Spain	Spagna	Oriol Cardona Coll	Ski mountaineering	
78	South Africa	Sud Africa	Thomas Weir	Alpine skiing	
79	Sweden	Svezia	Volunteer		
80	Switzerland	Svizzera	Alina Müller	Ice hockey	
81	Chinese Taipei	Chinese Taipei	Sophia Tsu Velicer	Figure skating	
82	Thailand	Thailandia	Karen Chanloung	Cross-country skiing	
82	Thailand	Thailandia	Mark Chanloung	Cross-country skiing	
83	Trinidad and Tobago	Trinidad e Tobago	De Aundre John	Bobsleigh	
84	Turkey	Türkiye	Volunteer		
85	Ukraine	Ucraina	Anhelina Brykina	Alpine skiing	
85	Ukraine	Ucraina	Dmytro Kotovskyi	Alpine skiing	
86	Hungary	Ungheria	Maja Dora Somodi	Short-track speed skating	
86	Hungary	Ungheria	Bence Nogradi	Short-track speed skating	
87	Uruguay	Uruguay	Volunteer		
88	Uzbekistan	Uzbekistan	Volunteer		
89	Venezuela	Venezuela	Volunteer		
90	United States	Stati Uniti d'America	Evan Bates	Figure skating	
90	United States	Stati Uniti d'America	Hilary Knight	Ice hockey	
91	France	Francia	Mathis Desloges	Cross-country skiing	
91	France	Francia	Lou Jeanmonnot	Biathlon	
92	Italy	Italia	Davide Ghiotto	Speed skating	
92	Italy	Italia	Lisa Vittozzi	Biathlon	
