= List of flag bearers for Trinidad and Tobago at the Olympics =

Trinidad and Tobago at the Olympics
- IOC code: TTO
- NOC: Trinidad and Tobago Olympic Committee
- Website: www.ttoc.org
- Medals: Gold 3 Silver 5 Bronze 11 Total 19

Summer appearances
- 1948; 1952; 1956; 1960; 1964; 1968; 1972; 1976; 1980; 1984; 1988; 1992; 1996; 2000; 2004; 2008; 2012; 2016; 2020; 2024

Winter appearances
- 1994; 1998; 2002; 2006–2018; 2022; 2026

Other related appearances
- British West Indies (1960 S)

This is a list of flag bearers who have represented Trinidad and Tobago at the Olympics.

Flag bearers carry the national flag of their country at the opening ceremony of the Olympic Games.

#	Event year	Season	Flag bearer	Sport
1	1948	Summer	Wilfred Tull	Athletics
2	1952	Summer	Rodney Wilkes	Weightlifting
3	1956	Summer	Mike Agostini	Athletics
4	1964	Summer	Wendell Mottley	Athletics
5	1968	Summer	Roger Gibbon	Cycling
6	1972	Summer	Hasely Crawford	Athletics
7	1976	Summer	Hasely Crawford	Athletics
8	1980	Summer	Hasely Crawford	Athletics
9	1984	Summer	Hasely Crawford	Athletics
10	1988	Summer	Ian Morris	Athletics
11	1992	Summer	Alvin Daniel	Athletics
12	1994	Winter	Gregory Sun	Bobsleigh
13	1996	Summer	Gene Samuel	Cycling
14	1998	Winter	Curtis Harry	Bobsleigh
15	2000	Summer	Ato Boldon	Athletics
16	2002	Winter	Gregory Sun	Bobsleigh
17	2004	Summer	Ato Boldon	Athletics
18	2008	Summer	George Bovell	Swimming
19	2012	Summer	Marc Burns	Athletics
20	2016	Summer	Keshorn Walcott	Athletics
21	2020	Summer	Kelly-Ann Baptiste	Athletics
22	2022	Winter	Andre Marcano	Bobsleigh
23	2024	Summer	Michelle-Lee Ahye	Athletics
23	2024	Summer	Dylan Carter	Swimming

== See also ==
- Trinidad and Tobago at the Olympics
