= 2026 Winter Olympics Parade of Nations =

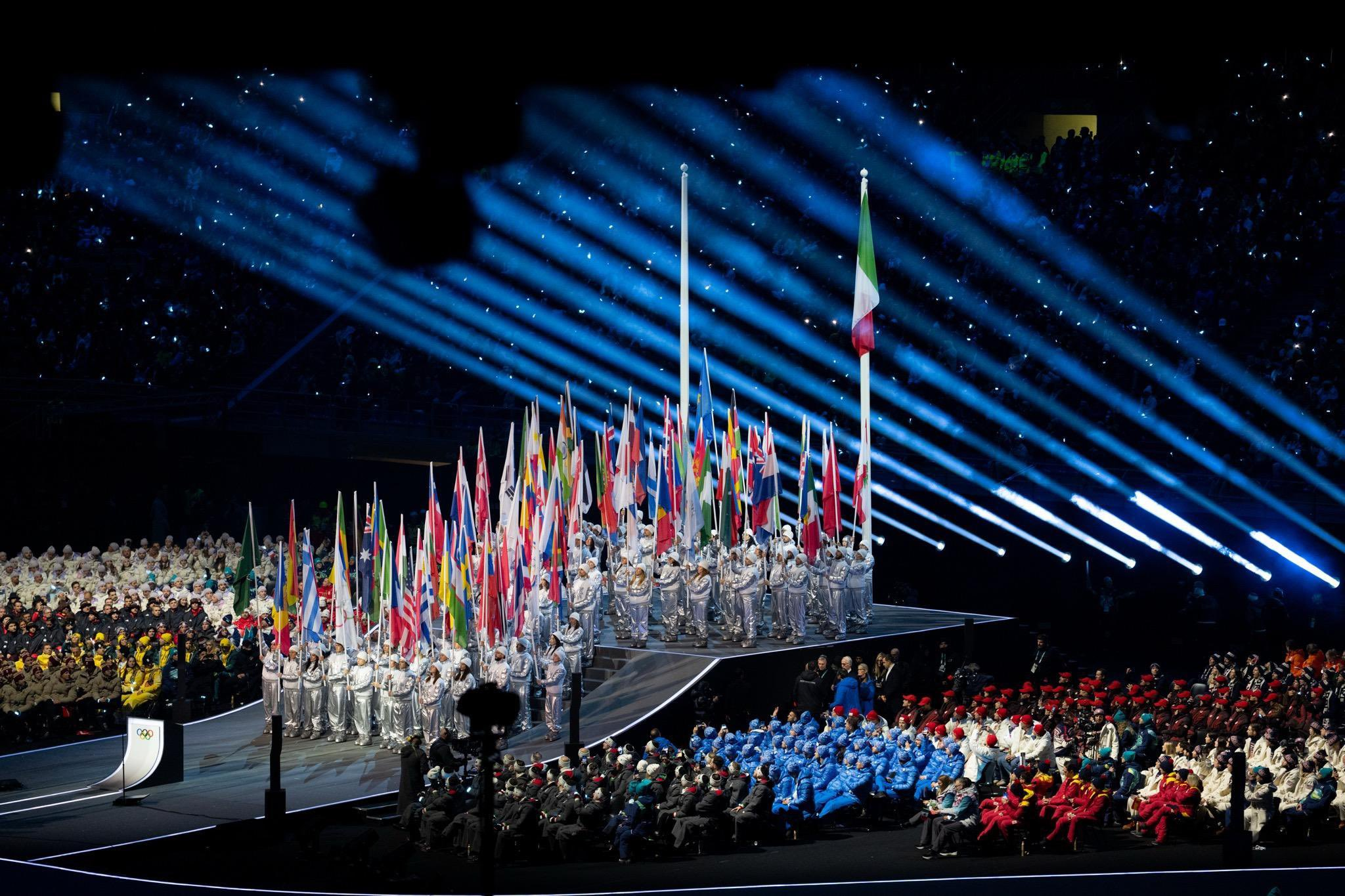
Flag bearers at the 2026 Winter Olympics opening ceremony

During the Parade of Nations within the Milan and Cortina d'Ampezzo 2026 Winter Olympics opening ceremony, athletes and officials from each participating country marched in the San Siro Stadium preceded by their flag and placard bearer. Each flag bearer had been chosen either by the nation's National Olympic Committee or by the athletes themselves.

== Parade order ==
By tradition, Greece entered first as the originator of the Olympics, and Italy entered last as host. Per a new rule introduced by the International Olympic Committee at the 2020 Summer Olympics, in Tokyo, the United States entered antepenultimately as the host of the 2034 Winter Olympics, in Utah, and France entered penultimately as the host of the 2030 Winter Olympics, in the French Alps. All nations in between entered in the order of the host nation's language, Italian.

Taiwan, participating as Chinese Taipei, marched under T rather than C. The Czech Republic and Turkey marched using their official short-form names: Czechia and Türkiye, respectively.

=== Participation of Russian and Belarusian athletes ===
The Olympic Committees of Russia and Belarus remain suspended in the aftermath of the 2022 Russian invasion of Ukraine. The International Olympic Committee announced in September 2025 that Russian and Belarusian athletes would be allowed to compete at the 2026 Games as "Individual Neutral Athletes" with no representation in the parade of nations under the same rules used at the 2024 Summer Olympics.

== Locations ==
With the games divided into four geographic clusters, the Parade of Nations was held in four locations: San Siro Stadium in Milan, the city centre in Cortina, Predazzo Ski Jumping Stadium in Predazzo, and Livigno Snow Park in Livigno. Nations were allowed to name two flagbearers, even if all their athletes were at one location; as host country, Italy had four.

== List ==
The following is a list of each country's flag bearer. The list is sorted by the sequence that each nation appeared in the parade of nations. The names are given in their official designations by the IOC, and the Italian names follow their official designations by the Milano Cortina Organizing Committee for the Olympic Games.

Order	Nation	Italian	Flag bearer	Parade location	Sport	Ref.
1	Greece	Grecia	Nefeli Tita	Predazzo	Cross-country skiing	
2	Albania	Albania	Lara Colturi	Cortina	Alpine skiing	
2	Albania	Albania	Denni Xhepa	Livigno	Alpine skiing	
3	Andorra	Andorra	Joan Verdú	Livigno	Alpine skiing	
3	Andorra	Andorra	Cande Moreno	Cortina	Alpine skiing	
3	Andorra	Andorra	Irineu Esteve	Predazzo	Cross-country skiing	
4	Saudi Arabia	Arabia Saudita	Rakan Alireza	Livigno	Cross-country skiing	
5	Argentina	Argentina	Franco Dal Farra	Livigno	Cross-country skiing	
5	Argentina	Argentina	Francesca Baruzzi	Cortina	Alpine skiing	
6	Armenia	Armenia	Karina Akopova	Milan	Figure skating	
6	Armenia	Armenia	Nikita Rakhmanin	Milan	Figure skating	
7	Australia	Australia	Matt Graham	Livigno	Freestyle skiing	
7	Australia	Australia	Jakara Anthony	Livigno	Freestyle skiing	
8	Austria	Austria	Benjamin Karl	Livigno	Snowboarding	
8	Austria	Austria	Anna Gasser	Livigno	Snowboarding	
9	Azerbaijan	Azerbaigian	Anastasia Papatoma	Cortina	Alpine skiing	
9	Azerbaijan	Azerbaigian	Vladimir Litvintsev	Milan	Figure skating	
10	Belgium	Belgio	Hanne Desmet	Milan	Short-track speed skating	
10	Belgium	Belgio	~~Maximilien Drion~~	Milan	~~Ski mountaineering~~	
11	Benin	Benin	Nathan Tchibozo	Livigno	Alpine skiing	
12	Bolivia	Bolivia	Timo Juhani Grönlund	Predazzo	Cross-country skiing	
13	Bosnia and Herzegovina	Bosnia Erzegovina	Marko Šljivić	Livigno	Alpine skiing	
13	Bosnia and Herzegovina	Bosnia Erzegovina	Elvedina Muzaferija	Cortina	Alpine skiing	
14	Brazil	Brasile	Lucas Pinheiro Braathen	Milan	Alpine skiing	
14	Brazil	Brasile	Nicole Silveira	Cortina	Skeleton	
15	Bulgaria	Bulgaria	Alexandra Feigin	Milan	Figure skating	
15	Bulgaria	Bulgaria	Vladimir Iliev	Cortina	Biathlon	
16	Canada	Canada	Mikaël Kingsbury	Livigno	Freestyle skiing	
16	Canada	Canada	Marielle Thompson	Livigno	Freestyle skiing	
17	Czech Republic	Cechia	Lucie Charvátová	Cortina	Biathlon	
17	Czech Republic	Cechia	David Pastrňák	Milan	Ice hockey	
18	Chile	Cile	Matilde Schwencke	Cortina	Alpine skiing	
18	Chile	Cile	Sebastián Endrestad	Predazzo	Cross-country skiing	
19	China	Repubblica Popolare Cinese	Ning Zhongyan	Milan	Speed skating	
19	China	Repubblica Popolare Cinese	Zhang Chutong	Milan	Short-track speed skating	
20	Cyprus	Cipro	Yianno Kouyoumdjian	Livigno	Alpine skiing	
20	Cyprus	Cipro	Andrea Loizidou	Cortina	Alpine skiing	
21	Colombia	Colombia	Fredrik Fodstad	Predazzo	Cross-country skiing	
22	South Korea	Repubblica di Corea	Cha Jun-hwan	Milan	Figure skating	
22	South Korea	Repubblica di Corea	Park Ji-woo	Milan	Speed skating	
23	Croatia	Croazia	Matija Legović	Cortina	Biathlon	
23	Croatia	Croazia	Valentina Aščić	Milan	Short-track speed skating	
24	Denmark	Danimarca	Jesper Jensen Aabo	Milan	Ice hockey	
24	Denmark	Danimarca	Denise Dupont	Cortina	Curling	
25	Ecuador	Ecuador	Klaus Jungbluth	Predazzo	Cross-country skiing	
26	United Arab Emirates	Emirati Arabi Uniti	Alexander Astridge	Livigno	Alpine skiing	
26	United Arab Emirates	Emirati Arabi Uniti	Piera Hudson	Cortina	Alpine skiing	
27	Eritrea	Eritrea	Shannon-Ogbnai Abeda	Livigno	Alpine skiing	
28	Estonia	Estonia	Johanna Talihärm	Cortina	Biathlon	
28	Estonia	Estonia	Marten Liiv	Milan	Speed skating	
29	Philippines	Filippine	Tallulah Proulx	Cortina	Alpine skiing	
29	Philippines	Filippine	Francis Ceccarelli	Livigno	Alpine skiing	
30	Finland	Finlandia	Krista Pärmäkoski	Predazzo	Cross-country skiing	
30	Finland	Finlandia	Mikko Lehtonen	Milan	Ice hockey	
31	Georgia	Georgia	Luka Berulava	Milan	Figure skating	
31	Georgia	Georgia	Diana Davis	Milan	Figure skating	
32	Germany	Germania	Leon Draisaitl	Milan	Ice hockey	
32	Germany	Germania	Katharina Schmid	Predazzo	Ski jumping	
33	Jamaica	Giamaica	Mica Moore	Cortina	Bobsleigh	
33	Jamaica	Giamaica	Henri Rivers IV	Livigno	Alpine skiing	
34	Japan	Giappone	Wataru Morishige	Milan	Speed skating	
34	Japan	Giappone	Sena Tomita	Livigno	Snowboarding	
35	Great Britain	Gran Bretagna	Brad Hall	Cortina	Bobsleigh	
35	Great Britain	Gran Bretagna	Lilah Fear	Milan	Figure skating	
36	Guinea-Bissau	Guinea-Bissau	Winston Tang	Livigno	Alpine skiing	
37	Haiti	Haiti	Stevenson Savart	Predazzo	Cross-country skiing	
38	Hong Kong	Hong Kong, Cina	Eloise Yung Shih King	Cortina	Alpine skiing	
38	Hong Kong	Hong Kong, Cina	Darren Kwok Tsz Fung	Milan	Short-track speed skating	
39	India	India	Arif Khan	Livigno	Alpine skiing	
40	Iran	Repubblica Islamica dell'Iran	Samaneh Beyrami Baher	Predazzo	Cross-country skiing	
40	Iran	Repubblica Islamica dell'Iran	Danyal Saveh Shemshaki	Predazzo	Cross-country skiing	
41	Ireland	Irlanda	Anabelle Zurbay	Cortina	Alpine skiing	
41	Ireland	Irlanda	Thomas Maloney Westgård	Predazzo	Cross-country skiing	
42	Iceland	Islanda	Elín Elmarsdóttir Van Pelt	Cortina	Alpine skiing	
42	Iceland	Islanda	Jón Erik Sigurðsson	Livigno	Alpine skiing	
43	Israel	Israele	Mariia Seniuk	Milan	Figure skating	
43	Israel	Israele	Jared Firestone	Cortina	Skeleton	
44	Kazakhstan	Kazakistan	Denis Nikisha	Milan	Short-track speed skating	
44	Kazakhstan	Kazakistan	Ayaulym Amrenova	Livigno	Freestyle skiing	
45	Kenya	Kenya	Sabrina Simader		Alpine skiing	
45	Kenya	Kenya	Issa Laborde Dit Pere	Livigno	Alpine skiing	
46	Kosovo	Kosovo	Kiana Kryeziu	Cortina	Alpine skiing	
46	Kosovo	Kosovo	Drin Kokaj	Livigno	Alpine skiing	
47	Kyrgyzstan	Kyrgyzstan	Artur Saparbekov	Predazzo	Cross-country skiing	
48	Latvia	Lettonia	Kaspars Daugaviņš	Milan	Ice hockey	
48	Latvia	Lettonia	Dženifera Ģērmane	Cortina	Alpine skiing	
49	Lebanon	Libano	Andrea El Hayek	Livigno	Alpine skiing	
50	Liechtenstein	Liechtenstein	Martin Kranz	Cortina	Bobsleigh	
51	Lithuania	Lituania	Allison Reed	Milan	Figure skating	
51	Lithuania	Lituania	Saulius Ambrulevičius	Milan	Figure skating	
52	Luxembourg	Lussemburgo	Matthieu Osch	Milan	Alpine skiing	
53	North Macedonia	Macedonia del Nord	Jana Atanasovska	Cortina	Alpine skiing	
53	North Macedonia	Macedonia del Nord	Stavre Jada	Predazzo	Cross-country skiing	
54	Madagascar	Madagascar	Mialitiana Clerc	Cortina	Alpine skiing	
54	Madagascar	Madagascar	Mathieu Gravier	Livigno	Alpine skiing	
55	Malaysia	Malaysia	Aruwin Salehhuddin	Cortina	Alpine skiing	
56	Malta	Malta	Jenny Axisa Eriksen	Predazzo	Cross-country skiing	
57	Morocco	Marocco	Pietro Tranchina	Livigno	Alpine skiing	
58	Mexico	Messico	Donovan Carrillo	Milan	Figure skating	
58	Mexico	Messico	Sarah Schleper	Cortina	Alpine skiing	
59	Moldova	Repubblica di Moldova	Iulian Luchin	Predazzo	Cross-country skiing	
59	Moldova	Repubblica di Moldova	Elizaveta Hlusovici	Predazzo	Cross-country skiing	
60	Monaco	Monaco	Volunteer (Note: Monaco's only competitor, Arnaud Alessandria, missed the opening ceremony as he had a race on the following day.)	Milan	Volunteer	
61	Mongolia	Mongolia	Enkhbayaryn Ariuntungalag	Predazzo	Cross-country skiing	
61	Mongolia	Mongolia	Altanzulyn Ariunbat	Livigno	Alpine skiing	
62	Montenegro	Montenegro	Branislav Peković	Livigno	Alpine skiing	
63	Nigeria	Nigeria	Samuel Ikpefan	Predazzo	Cross-country skiing	
64	Norway	Norvegia	Kajsa Vickhoff Lie	Cortina	Alpine skiing	
64	Norway	Norvegia	Peder Kongshaug	Milan	Speed skating	
65	New Zealand	Nuova Zelanda	Zoi Sadowski-Synnott	Livigno	Snowboarding	
65	New Zealand	Nuova Zelanda	Ben Barclay	Livigno	Freestyle skiing	
66	Netherlands	Paesi Bassi	Jens van 't Wout	Milan	Short-track speed skating	
66	Netherlands	Paesi Bassi	Kimberley Bos	Cortina	Skeleton	
67	Pakistan	Pakistan	Muhammad Karim	Livigno	Alpine skiing	
68	Poland	Polonia	Kamil Stoch	Predazzo	Ski jumping	
68	Poland	Polonia	Natalia Czerwonka	Milan	Speed skating	
69	Puerto Rico	Porto Rico	Kellie Delka	Cortina	Skeleton	
70	Portugal	Portogallo	Vanina Guerillot	Cortina	Alpine skiing	
70	Portugal	Portogallo	José Cabeça	Predazzo	Cross-country skiing	
71	Romania	Romania	Julia Sauter	Milan	Figure skating	
71	Romania	Romania	Mihai Țentea	Cortina	Bobsleigh	
71	Romania	Romania	Raluca Strămăturaru	Cortina	Luge	
72	San Marino	San Marino	Rafael Mini	Livigno	Alpine skiing	
73	Serbia	Serbia	Anja Ilić	Predazzo	Cross-country skiing	
73	Serbia	Serbia	Miloš Milosavljević	Predazzo	Cross-country skiing	
74	Singapore	Singapore	Faiz Basha	Livigno	Alpine skiing	
75	Slovakia	Slovacchia	Viktória Čerňanská	Cortina	Bobsleigh	
75	Slovakia	Slovacchia	Tomáš Tatar	Milan	Ice hockey	
76	Slovenia	Slovenia	Nika Prevc	Predazzo	Ski jumping	
76	Slovenia	Slovenia	Domen Prevc	Predazzo	Ski jumping	
77	Spain	Spagna	Joaquim Salarich	Livigno	Alpine skiing	
77	Spain	Spagna	Olivia Smart	Milan	Figure skating	
78	South Africa	Sud Africa	Nicole Burger	Cortina	Skeleton	
78	South Africa	Sud Africa	Matthew Smith	Predazzo	Cross-country skiing	
79	Sweden	Svezia	Sara Hector	Cortina	Alpine skiing	
79	Sweden	Svezia	Walter Wallberg	Livigno	Freestyle skiing	
80	Switzerland	Svizzera	Fanny Smith	Livigno	Freestyle skiing	
80	Switzerland	Svizzera	Nino Niederreiter	Milan	Ice hockey	
81	Chinese Taipei	Chinese Taipei	Lin Hsin-jung	Cortina	Bobsleigh	
81	Chinese Taipei	Chinese Taipei	Li Yu-Hsiang	Milan	Figure skating	
82	Thailand	Thailandia	Karen Chanloung	Predazzo	Cross-country skiing	
82	Thailand	Thailandia	Mark Chanloung	Predazzo	Cross-country skiing	
83	Trinidad and Tobago	Trinidad e Tobago	Emma Gatcliffe	Cortina	Alpine skiing	
83	Trinidad and Tobago	Trinidad e Tobago	Nikhil Alleyne	Livigno	Alpine skiing	
84	Turkey	Türkiye	İrem Dursun	Predazzo	Cross-country skiing	
84	Turkey	Türkiye	Furkan Akar	Milan	Short-track speed skating	
85	Ukraine	Ucraina	Vladyslav Heraskevych	Cortina	Skeleton	
85	Ukraine	Ucraina	Yelyzaveta Sydorko	Milan	Short-track speed skating	
86	Hungary	Ungheria	Bence Nógrádi	Milan	Short-track speed skating	
86	Hungary	Ungheria	Maja Somodi	Milan	Short-track speed skating	
87	Uruguay	Uruguay	Nicolás Pirozzi	Livigno	Alpine skiing	
88	Uzbekistan	Uzbekistan	Daniil Eybog	Milan	Short-track speed skating	
89	Venezuela	Venezuela	Nicolás Claveau-Laviolette	Predazzo	Cross-country skiing	
90	United States	Stati Uniti d'America	Frank Del Duca	Cortina	Bobsleigh	
90	United States	Stati Uniti d'America	Erin Jackson	Milan	Speed skating	
91	France	Francia	Clément Noël	Livigno	Alpine skiing	
91	France	Francia	Chloé Trespeuch	Livigno	Snowboarding	
92	Italy	Italia	Federico Pellegrino	Milan	Cross-country skiing	
92	Italy	Italia	Amos Mosaner	Cortina	Curling	
92	Italy	Italia	Arianna Fontana	Milan	Short-track speed skating	
92	Italy	Italia	Federica Brignone	Cortina	Alpine skiing	

== See also ==
- 2026 Winter Paralympics Parade of Nations
