= Alpine skiing at the 2026 Winter Olympics – Qualification =

The following is about the qualification rules and the quota allocation for the alpine skiing events at the 2026 Winter Olympics.

== Qualification rules ==
=== Quotas ===
A maximum of 306 athletes are allowed to compete at the Olympic Games. A maximum of 22 athletes per nation will be allowed to compete with a maximum of 11 males or 11 females from a nation being permitted. A nation may not enter more than four athletes in any single event. Each nation may also enter a maximum of four teams in each gender's team combined events.

To qualify a nation must have at least one athlete meet basic eligibility requirements of age, medical fitness, and be under the prescribed maximum points on the FIS points list that takes into account results from 1 July 2024 to 18 January 2026. The Points List is calculated by taking the average of five best event results for technical events (giant slalom and slalom) and two best results for speed events (downhill, super G, and super combined). To compete in giant slalom or slalom an athlete must have a point average of less than 120 in those disciplines. To compete in downhill or super G an athlete must have a point total less than 80 in those disciplines. To compete in the team combined events an NOC must have an athlete who has met the standard in downhill as well as an athlete who has met the standard in slalom.

=== Allocation of quotas ===
Basic Quota

Every NOC will be assigned one male and one female quota spot for meeting the minimum basic standards.

Host nation

The host nation (Italy) is awarded an additional quota per gender, granted all athletes meet the standard above.

Top 30 on Points list

Every NOC with at least one male and/or female in the top 30 of the World Cup Start List of any event will be allocated one additional male and/or female quota in addition to the basic quota. If an athlete is ranked in the top 30 in more than one event a second additional quota for that sex will be given or if two different athletes are in the top 30 in a single event.

Remaining quotas

The remaining quotas will be assigned using the Olympic Quota allocation list on 18 January 2026. The spots will be assigned until a maximum of 306 quotas are reached including the above. When a nation reaches its maximum, remaining athletes from that country will be skipped over. The list is a table of athletes in the top 500 in their two best events (including both male and female athletes). These additional quotas are gender specific, and will be used to create a maximum of 153 male and 153 female competitors.

An athlete can be counted only once for the above criteria. For example, if a country has only one athlete meeting all three criteria then only one quota will be given (not 3).

== Qualification summary ==
NOC's with a 'basic' quota have met minimum participation standards and are assured of Olympic participation. However 'top 30' and 'additional' quotas are not assured and can continue to change up until 18 January 2026.

- The FIS published final quota lists 19 January 2026. Reallocation after this date is noted where applicable. The last reallocation was published on 10 February 2026.

Nations	Women (basic)	Men (basic)	Women top 30	Men top 30	Additional women	Additional men	Athletes
Albania	1	1	2				4
Andorra	1	1		1	2		5
Argentina	1	1			1		3
Armenia		1					1
Australia	1	1			1		3
Austria	1	1	2	2	8	8	22
Azerbaijan	1						1
Belgium	1	1		~~2~~ 1			3
Benin		1					1
Bosnia and Herzegovina	1	1			1		3
Brazil	1	1		2			4
Bulgaria	1	1		1			3
Canada	1	1	2	2	5	2	13
Chile	1	1					2
China	1	1					2
Chinese Taipei	1	1					2
Croatia	1	1	2	2			6
Cyprus	1	1					2
Czech Republic	1	1	2	1	3		8
Denmark	1	1					2
Eritrea		1					1
Estonia	~~1~~ 0	1					1
Finland	1	1		2	2		6
France	1	1	2	2	5	5	16
Georgia	1	1					2
Germany	1	1	2	2	~~3~~ 1	2	9
Great Britain	~~1~~ 0	1		2			3
Greece	1	1					2
Guinea-Bissau		1					1
Haiti		1					1
Hong Kong	1	1					2
Hungary	1	1					2
Iceland	1	1			1		3
India		1					1
Individual Neutral Athletes	2	1					3
Iran	1	1					2
Ireland	1	1					2
Israel	1	1					2
Italy	1	1	2	2	8	7	21
Jamaica		1					1
Japan	1	1					2
Kazakhstan	1	1					2
Kenya	~~1~~ 0	1					1
Kosovo	1	1					2
Kyrgyzstan		1					1
Latvia	1	1	1				3
Lebanon	~~1~~ 0	1					1
Liechtenstein	1	1					2
Lithuania	1	1					2
Luxembourg	1	1					2
Madagascar	1	1					2
Malaysia	1						1
Mexico	1	1					2
Monaco		1					1
Mongolia		1					1
Montenegro		1					1
Morocco		1					1
~~Netherlands~~	~~1~~ 0	~~1~~ 0					0
New Zealand	1	~~1~~ 0	~~2~~ 0				1
North Macedonia	1	1					2
Norway	1	1	2	2	3	~~8~~ 6	15
Pakistan		1					1
Philippines	1	1					2
Poland	1	1	1				3
Portugal	1	1					2
Romania	1	1					2
San Marino		1					1
Saudi Arabia		1					1
Serbia	~~1~~ 0	1					1
Singapore		1					1
Slovakia	1	1	2				4
Slovenia	1	1	2	2	~~3~~ 2		8
South Africa	1	1					2
South Korea	1	1			1		3
Spain	1	1					2
Sweden	1	1	2	1	~~3~~ 2		7
Switzerland	1	1	2	2	8	8	22
Thailand		1					1
Trinidad and Tobago	1	1					2
Turkey	1	1					2
Ukraine	1	1					2
United Arab Emirates	1	1					2
United States	1	1	2	2	8	3	17
Uruguay		1					1
Uzbekistan		1					1
Total: 84 (Note: The FIS has separated AIN into 'Russia' and 'Belarus' in their tables giving them a total of 85. One male and one female individual neutral athlete from Russia and one female individual neutral athlete from Belarus qualified to compete. The Netherlands rejected their only quotas.)	61	81	30	31	62	41	306

=== Next eligible NOC per event ===
A country can be eligible for more than one quota spot per event in the reallocation process. Only NOCs able to accept a quota are listed; once they have declined a quota they are removed from further eligibility. Ten female, and five male quotas were made available. Bolded NOCs have accepted quotas.

Women's	Men's
**Andorra**; **Canada**; **Finland**; ~~France~~; ~~Sweden~~; **Finland**; **Czech Republic**; **Canada**; **Andorra**; **Canada**; **South Korea**; ~~Canada~~; **Czech Republic**; **Iceland**; **Czech Republic**; Czech Republic; Israel	**Germany**; **Austria**; **France**; ~~Sweden~~; **Germany**; **France**; Italy; United States; France
