= Mexico at the 2002 Winter Olympics =

- IOC code: MEX
- NOC: Mexican Olympic Committee
- Website: www.soycom.org (in Spanish)

in Salt Lake City, Utah
- Competitors: 3 in 2 sports
- Flag bearer: Roberto Tamés
- Medals: Gold 0 Silver 0 Bronze 0 Total 0

Winter Olympics appearances (overview)
- 1928; 1932–1980; 1984; 1988; 1992; 1994; 1998; 2002; 2006; 2010; 2014; 2018; 2022; 2026

Mexico was represented at the 2002 Winter Olympics in Salt Lake City, Utah, United States by the Mexican Olympic Committee.

In total, three athletes – all men – represented Mexico in two different sports including bobsleigh and skeleton.

== Competitors ==
In total, three athletes represented Mexico at the 2002 Winter Olympics in Salt Lake City, Utah, United States across two different sports.

Sport	Men	Women	Total
Bobsleigh	2	0	2
Skeleton	1	0	1
Total	3	0	3

== Bobsleigh ==
In total, two Mexican athletes participated in the bobsleigh events – Roberto Lauderdale and Roberto Tamés in the two-man bob.

The bobsleigh events took place at the purpose-built Utah Olympic Park in Summit County, Utah, United States from 16 to 23 February 2002.

The two-man bobsleigh took place on 16 and 17 February 2002. The first two runs took place on 16 February and the last two runs on 17 February. In their first run, Lauderdale and Tamés completed the course in 49.57 seconds. On their second run, the pair recorded a time of 49.65 seconds. Their third run was their slowest of the four at 50.07 seconds and their final run was 49.82 seconds. Their total time of three minutes 19.11 seconds saw them finish in 35th place overall.

Athlete	Event	Run 1		Run 2		Run 3		Run 4		Total	
Athlete	Event	Time	Rank	Time	Rank	Time	Rank	Time	Rank	Time	Rank
Roberto Lauderdale; Roberto Tamés	Two-man	49.57	34	49.65	35	50.07	36	49.82	36	3:19.11	35

== Skeleton ==
In total, one Mexican athlete participated in the skeleton events – Luis Carrasco in the men's competition.

The skeleton events also took place at the purpose-built Utah Olympic Park in Summit County, Utah, United States on 20 February 2002.

The men's skeleton took place on 20 February 2002. Carrasco completed his first run in a time of 54.32 seconds and his second run in a time of 54.66 seconds. His total time of one minute 48.98 seconds saw him finish in 25th place overall.

Athlete	Event	Run 1		Run 2		Total	
Athlete	Event	Time	Rank	Time	Rank	Time	Rank
Luis Carrasco	Men's	54.32	25	54.66	25	1:48.98	25
