= Bobsleigh at the 2002 Winter Olympics – Two-man =

Two-man at the XIX Olympic Winter Games
- Pictogram for bobsleigh
- Venue: Park City
- Dates: February 16 — 17, 2002
- Competitors: 74 from 27 nations
- Winning time: 3:10.11

Medalists
1st place, gold medalist(s)		Germany; Christoph Langen, Markus Zimmermann
2nd place, silver medalist(s)		Switzerland; Christian Reich, Steve Anderhub
3rd place, bronze medalist(s)		Switzerland; Martin Annen, Beat Hefti

The Men's two-man bobsleigh competition at the 2002 Winter Olympics in Salt Lake City, United States was held on 16 and 17 February, at Park City.

== Results ==
Each of the 37 two-man teams entered for the event completed all four runs

Rank	Country	Athletes	Run 1	Run 2	Run 3	Run 4	Total
Gold medal	Germany (GER-1)	Christoph Langen; Markus Zimmermann	47.54	47.52	47.44	47.61	3:10.11
Silver medal	Switzerland (SUI-1)	Christian Reich; Steve Anderhub	47.52	47.53	47.45	47.70	3:10.20
Bronze medal	Switzerland (SUI-2)	Martin Annen; Beat Hefti	47.56	47.64	47.73	47.69	3:10.62
4	United States (USA-1)	Todd Hays; Garrett Hines	47.71	47.70	47.61	47.63	3:10.65
5	Canada (CAN-1)	Pierre Lueders; Giulio Zardo	47.67	47.70	47.65	47.71	3:10.73
6	Germany (GER-2)	René Spies; Franz Sagmeister	47.77	47.69	47.61	47.77	3:10.84
7	Austria	Wolfgang Stampfer; Martin Schützenauer	47.91	47.78	47.72	47.75	3:11.16
8	Italy (ITA-1)	Günther Huber; Antonio Tartaglia	47.84	47.88	47.92	48.00	3:11.64
9	United States (USA-2)	Brian Shimer; Darrin Steele	47.92	47.99	48.07	47.95	3:11.93
10	Great Britain (GBR-1)	Lee Johnston; Marcus Adam	48.04	48.16	48.05	48.02	3:12.27
11	Latvia (LAT-1)	Sandis Prūsis; Mārcis Rullis	48.10	48.06	48.08	48.36	3:12.60
11	Italy (ITA-2)	Fabrizio Tosini; Cristian La Grassa	48.04	48.16	48.03	48.37	3:12.60
13	France	Bruno Mingeon; Emmanuel Hostache	48.23	48.03	48.27	48.15	3:12.68
13	Latvia (LAT-2)	Gatis Gūts; Intars Dīcmanis	48.07	48.22	48.14	48.25	3:12.68
15	Russia (RUS-2)	Yevgeny Popov; Pyotr Makarchuk	48.12	48.18	48.22	48.19	3:12.71
16	Netherlands	Arend Glas; Marcel Welten	48.26	48.23	48.26	48.33	3:13.08
16	Czech Republic (CZE-2)	Ivo Danilevič; Roman Gomola	48.19	48.28	48.35	48.26	3:13.08
18	Russia (RUS-1)	Alexandr Zubkov; Dmitriy Stepushkin	48.71	48.16	48.15	48.07	3:13.09
19	Czech Republic (CZE-1)	Pavel Puškár; Jan Kobián	48.22	48.03	48.35	48.50	3:13.10
20	Norway	Arnfinn Kristiansen; Bjarne Røyland	48.34	48.21	48.46	48.17	3:13.18
21	Japan (JPN-1)	Hiroshi Suzuki; Masanori Inoue	48.41	48.61	48.58	48.36	3:13.96
22	Monaco	Patrice Servelle; Sebastien Gattuso	48.37	48.56	48.43	48.76	3:14.12
22	Great Britain (GBR-2)	Neil Scarisbrick; Colin Bryce	48.44	48.46	48.72	48.50	3:14.12
24	Canada (CAN-2)	Yannick Morin; John Sokolowski	48.41	48.50	48.55	48.70	3:14.16
25	Romania	Florian Enache; Adrian Duminicel	48.52	48.51	48.65	48.75	3:14.43
26	Ireland	Peter Donohoe; Paul Kiernan	48.50	48.95	48.51	48.51	3:14.47
27	New Zealand	Alan Henderson; Mark Edmond	48.46	48.36	48.72	49.36	3:14.90
28	Jamaica	Winston Watt; Lascelles Brown	48.59	48.58	49.01	48.76	3:14.94
29	Japan (JPN-2)	Hiroaki Ohishi; Shinji Miura	48.61	48.70	49.08	48.70	3:15.09
30	Slovakia	Milan Jagnešák; Róbert Kresťanko	49.00	48.96	49.28	48.87	3:16.11
31	Greece	John-Andrew Kambanis; Ioannis Leivatidis	49.03	49.06	49.60	48.97	3:16.16
32	Bulgaria	Stefan Vasilev; Miroslav Danov	49.77	49.35	49.48	49.42	3:18.02
33	Armenia	Dan Janjigian; Yorgo Alexandrou	49.53	49.50	49.75	49.33	3:18.11
34	Ukraine	Oleksandr Ivanyshyn; Oleksandr Streltsov	49.47	49.43	49.77	49.75	3:18.42
35	Mexico	Roberto Tamés; Roberto Lauderdale	49.57	49.65	50.07	49.82	3:19.11
36	Virgin Islands	Zachary Zoller; Quinn Wheeler	49.81	49.76	49.86	50.01	3:19.44
37	Trinidad and Tobago	Gregory Sun; Errol Aguilera	49.74	50.07	50.68	49.69	3:20.18
