= Trinidad and Tobago at the 1998 Winter Olympics =

- IOC code: TTO (TRI used at these Games)
- NOC: Trinidad and Tobago Olympic Committee
- Website: www.ttoc.org

in Nagano
- Competitors: 2 (men) in 1 sport
- Flag bearer: Curtis Harry
- Medals: Gold 0 Silver 0 Bronze 0 Total 0

Winter Olympics appearances (overview)
- 1994; 1998; 2002; 2006–2018; 2022; 2026; 2030

Trinidad and Tobago sent a delegation to compete at the 1998 Winter Olympics in Nagano, Japan from 7–22 February 1998. This was the nation's second time appearing at a Winter Olympic Games. The delegation to Nagano consisted of two bobsledders; Gregory Sun and Curtis Harry. In the two-man competition, they finished in 32nd place.

== Background ==
The Trinidad and Tobago Olympic Committee was recognised by the International Olympic Committee on 31 December 1946. Although they have sent delegations to every Summer Olympic Games since, except the 1960 Summer Olympics, they did not participate in their first Winter Olympics until the 1994 Lillehammer Games. Nagano was thus the nation's second appearance at a Winter Olympics. These Winter Olympics were held from 7–22 February 1998; a total of 2,176 athletes represented 72 National Olympic Committees. The delegation sent to Nagano consisted of two bobsledders; Curtis Harry and Gregory Sun. Harry was chosen as the flag bearer for the opening ceremony.

== Competitors ==
The following is the list of number of competitors in the Games.

Sport	Men	Women	Total
Bobsleigh	2	–	2
Total	2	0	2

== Bobsleigh ==
Gregory Sun and Curtis Harry were both 35 years old at the time of the Nagano Olympics, and were the same bobsleigh team that had represented Trinidad and Tobago at the 1994 Winter Olympics. The two-man bobsleigh race was a four-leg competition, held on 14–15 February, with two runs on each day. On the first day, they posted runs of 56.74 seconds, and 56.78 seconds. Overnight, they were in 31st place out of 37 sleds still in the competition. On the second day, the Trinidad and Tobago team posted times of 56.73 seconds, and 56.40 seconds. Overall, their total time was 3 minutes and 46.65 seconds, which put them in 32nd place, out of 36 sleds that finished the contest. The gold medal was won by Italy, the silver by Canada, and the bronze by Germany. Sun would later race again in the 2002 Winter Olympics.

Sled	Athletes	Event	Run 1		Run 2		Run 3		Run 4		Total	
Sled	Athletes	Event	Time	Rank	Time	Rank	Time	Rank	Time	Rank	Time	Rank
TRI-1	Gregory Sun; Curtis Harry	Two-man	56.74	32	56.78	32	56.73	35	56.40	32	3:46.65	32
