= Trinidad and Tobago at the 1994 Winter Olympics =

- IOC code: TTO (TRI used at these Games)
- NOC: Trinidad and Tobago Olympic Committee
- Website: www.ttoc.org

in Lillehammer
- Competitors: 2 in 1 sport
- Flag bearer: Gregory Sun
- Medals: Gold 0 Silver 0 Bronze 0 Total 0

Winter Olympics appearances (overview)
- 1994; 1998; 2002; 2006–2018; 2022; 2026; 2030

Trinidad and Tobago sent a delegation to compete at the 1994 Winter Olympics in Lillehammer, Norway from 12–27 February 1994. This was the nation's debut appearance at a Winter Olympic Games. The delegation consisted of two bobsledders, Gregory Sun and Curtis Harry. In the two-man competition, they finished in 37th place.

== Background ==
The Trinidad and Tobago Olympic Committee was recognized by the International Olympic Committee on 31 December 1946. Although they have sent delegations to every Summer Olympic Games since, except in 1960, they did not participate in the Winter Olympics until these Lillehammer Games. The 1994 Winter Olympics were held from 12–27 February 1994, a total of 1,737 athletes took part, representing 67 National Olympic Committees. The Trinidad and Tobago delegation to Lillehammer consisted of two bobsledders, Gregory Sun and Curtis Harry. Sun was chosen as the flag bearer for the opening ceremony.

== Competitors ==
The following is the list of number of competitors in the Games.

Sport	Men	Women	Total
Bobsleigh	2	–	2
Total	2	0	2

== Bobsleigh ==
Trinidad and Tobago was inspired to develop a bobsleigh team after watching the Jamaican team find success at the 1988 Winter Olympics, and had begun recruiting efforts. Gregory Sun and Curtis Harry were both 31 years old at the time of the Lillehammer Olympics, and were the same bobsleigh team that would represent Trinidad and Tobago at the 1998 Winter Olympics. Sun, a native of Trinidad and Tobago, was serving as a research assistant at the University of Idaho at the time. The two-man competition was a four leg race, held over 19–20 February, with two runs contested on each day. On the first day, they completed the first run in a time of 55.09 seconds and the second in 54.88 seconds. Overnight, they were in 38th place out of 43 sleds who had finished the day. On the second day, they posted a time of 55.06 seconds for their third run, and 55.13 seconds for the fourth and final run. Their final time was 3 minutes and 40.24 seconds, which put them in 37th place out of 42 sleds who completed the competition. The gold and silver medals were won by sleds from Switzerland, and the bronze by Italy.

Sled	Athletes	Event	Run 1		Run 2		Run 3		Run 4		Total	
Sled	Athletes	Event	Time	Rank	Time	Rank	Time	Rank	Time	Rank	Time	Rank
TRI-1	Gregory Sun; Curtis Harry	Two-man	55.09	38	54.88	37	55.14	37	55.13	37	3:40.24	37

== See also ==
- Trinidad and Tobago at the 1994 Commonwealth Games
