= Trinidad and Tobago at the 2002 Winter Olympics =

- The flag of Trinidad and Tobago
- IOC code: TTO (TRI used at these Games)
- NOC: Trinidad and Tobago Olympic Committee
- Website: www.ttoc.org

in Salt Lake City
- Competitors: 3 (men) in 1 sport
- Flag bearer: Gregory Sun
- Medals: Gold 0 Silver 0 Bronze 0 Total 0

Winter Olympics appearances (overview)
- 1994; 1998; 2002; 2006–2018; 2022; 2026

Trinidad and Tobago sent a delegation to compete at the 2002 Winter Olympics in Salt Lake City, United States from 8–24 February 2002. This was Trinidad and Tobago's third appearance at a Winter Olympic Games. The delegation consisted of three bobsledders, Gregory Sun, Andrew McNeilly, and Errol Aguilera. In the two-man competition, a four-run event in which all three men competed, they came in 37th place.

== Background ==
The Trinidad and Tobago Olympic Committee was recognized by the International Olympic Committee on 31 December 1946. Although they have sent delegations to every Summer Olympic Games since, except the 1960 Summer Olympics, they did not participate in their first Winter Olympics until the 1994 Lillehammer Games, and have never won a Winter Olympics medal. Salt Lake City was thus the nation's third appearance at a Winter Olympics. The 2002 Winter Olympics were held from 8–24 February 2002; a total of 2,399 athletes took part representing 77 National Olympic Committees. The Trinidad and Tobago delegation to Salt Lake City consisted of three bobsledders, Gregory Sun, Andrew McNeilly, and Errol Aguilera. Sun was chosen as the flag bearer for the opening ceremony.

== Bobsleigh ==
Gregory Sun was 39 at the time of the Salt Lake City Olympics, and had represented the country in their two prior Winter Olympics appearance. Andrew McNeilly was 29 years old, and Errol Aguilera was 23 years old; both were making their Olympic debuts. The two-man bobsleigh race was a four-leg race held on 16–17 February, with the sum of the times of all four legs determining final placement. Sun participated in all four runs, while McNeilly took part in the first two runs, and Aguilera was in the sled for the last two runs. On the first day, they posted run times of 49.74 seconds and 50.07 seconds. Overnight, they were in 37th and last place. The next day, they completed the third run in 50.68 seconds, and the final run in 49.69 seconds. Their final time was 3 minutes and 20.18 seconds, which put them in 37th place for the competition, last among all competitors. The gold medal was won by Germany in 3 minutes and 10.11 seconds, and the silver and bronze were taken by sleds from Switzerland.

Sled	Athletes	Event	Run 1		Run 2		Run 3		Run 4		Total	
Sled	Athletes	Event	Time	Rank	Time	Rank	Time	Rank	Time	Rank	Time	Rank
TRI-1	Gregory Sun; Andrew McNeilly; Errol Aguilera	Two-man	49.74	35	50.07	37	50.68	37	49.69	34	3:20.18	37
