= Ioannis Leivatidis =

Greek bobsledder

Personal information
- Nationality: Greek
- Born: 29 January 1974 (age 51); Chicago, Illinois, United States

Sport
- Sport: Bobsleigh

Ioannis Leivatidis (born 29 January 1974) is a Greek bobsledder. He competed in the two man event at the 2002 Winter Olympics.
