= Trinidad and Tobago at the 2022 Winter Olympics =

- Flag of Trinidad and Tobago
- IOC code: TTO
- NOC: Trinidad and Tobago Olympic Committee
- Website: www.ttoc.org

in Beijing, China 4–20 February 2022
- Competitors: 3 (3 men and 0 women) in 1 sport
- Flag bearer (opening): Andre Marcano
- Flag bearer (closing): Volunteer
- Medals: Gold 0 Silver 0 Bronze 0 Total 0

Winter Olympics appearances (overview)
- 1994; 1998; 2002; 2006–2018; 2022; 2026

Trinidad and Tobago competed at the 2022 Winter Olympics in Beijing, China, from 4 to 20 February 2022. It was the country's fourth appearance at the Winter Olympics, since its debut at the 1994 Winter Olympics in Lillehammer. The Trinidad and Tobago delegation consisted of three athletes competing in one sport. It did not win any medals at the Games.

== Background ==
The Trinidad and Tobago Olympic Committee was recognized by the International Olympic Committee (IOC) in 1948. Trinidad and Tobago made its first Olympic appearance at the 1948 Summer Olympics in London, and its Winter Olympics debut at the 1994 Winter Olympics in Lillehammer. The 2022 Winter Olympics was the nation's fourth appearance at the Winter Olympics, and its first since 2002.

The 2022 Winter Olympics was held in Beijing, China, between 4 and 22 February 2022. Bobsleigh racer Andre Marcano was the flag bearer for Trinidad and Tobago during the opening ceremony. Meanwhile, a volunteer was the flagbearer during the closing ceremony. Trinidad and Tobago did not win a medal at the Games.

== Competitors ==
The Trinidad and Tobago team consists of three athletes competing in a single event.

Sport	Men	Women	Total
Bobsleigh	3	0	3
Total	3	0	3

== Bobsleigh ==
As per the International Bobsleigh & Skeleton Federation, a maximum of 170 spots were available including 30 sleds in the two-man event and 28 in the four-man event. The qualification was based on the world rankings between 15 October 2020 and 16 January 2022. Sled pilots must have competed in six different races on three different tracks and been ranked in at least five of those races. Additionally, the pilot must been ranked among the top 50 for the man's events. For the men's events. A country could enter a maximum of three sleds for the event event.

Trinidad and Tobago qualified one two-man sled, marking its return to the sport and the Winter Olympics for the first time since 2002. The team for the Olympics was officially named on 19 January 2022, and consisted of Axel Brown, Andre Marcano, and Shakeel John. Brown was the pilot, Marcano was the breakman, with John serving as the reserve. Brown, whose mother is from Trinidad and Tobago and father is British, had represented Great Britain in other sporting events in the past. Marcano is a track and field athlete.

The bobsleigh event was held at the Yanqing National Alpine Skiing Centre on 14 and 15 February. There were 30 participants in the event, and the Trinidadian team was ranked 28th after the first run with a time of 1:00.81. The team set near identical times of 1:00.89 and 1:00.86 in the next two runs, and was classified in 28th in the final classification.

Athletes	Event	Run 1		Run 2		Run 3		Run 4		Total	
Athletes	Event	Time	Rank	Time	Rank	Time	Rank	Time	Rank	Time	Rank
Axel Brown*; Andre Marcano (run 1-2); Shakeel John (run 3)	Two-man	1:00.81	28	1:00.89	27	1:00.86	28	Did not advance		3:02.56	28

* – Denotes the driver of the sled

== See also ==
- Tropical nations at the Winter Olympics
- Trinidad and Tobago at the 2022 Commonwealth Games
