= Alpine skiing at the 2026 Winter Olympics – Women's giant slalom =

Women's giant slalom at the XXV Olympic Winter Games
- Alpine skiing
- Venue: Olimpia delle Tofane, Cortina d'Ampezzo
- Date: 15 February 2026

Medalists
1st place, gold medalist(s)		Federica Brignone	Italy
2nd place, silver medalist(s)		Sara Hector	Sweden
2nd place, silver medalist(s)		Thea Louise Stjernesund	Norway

Women's giant slalom
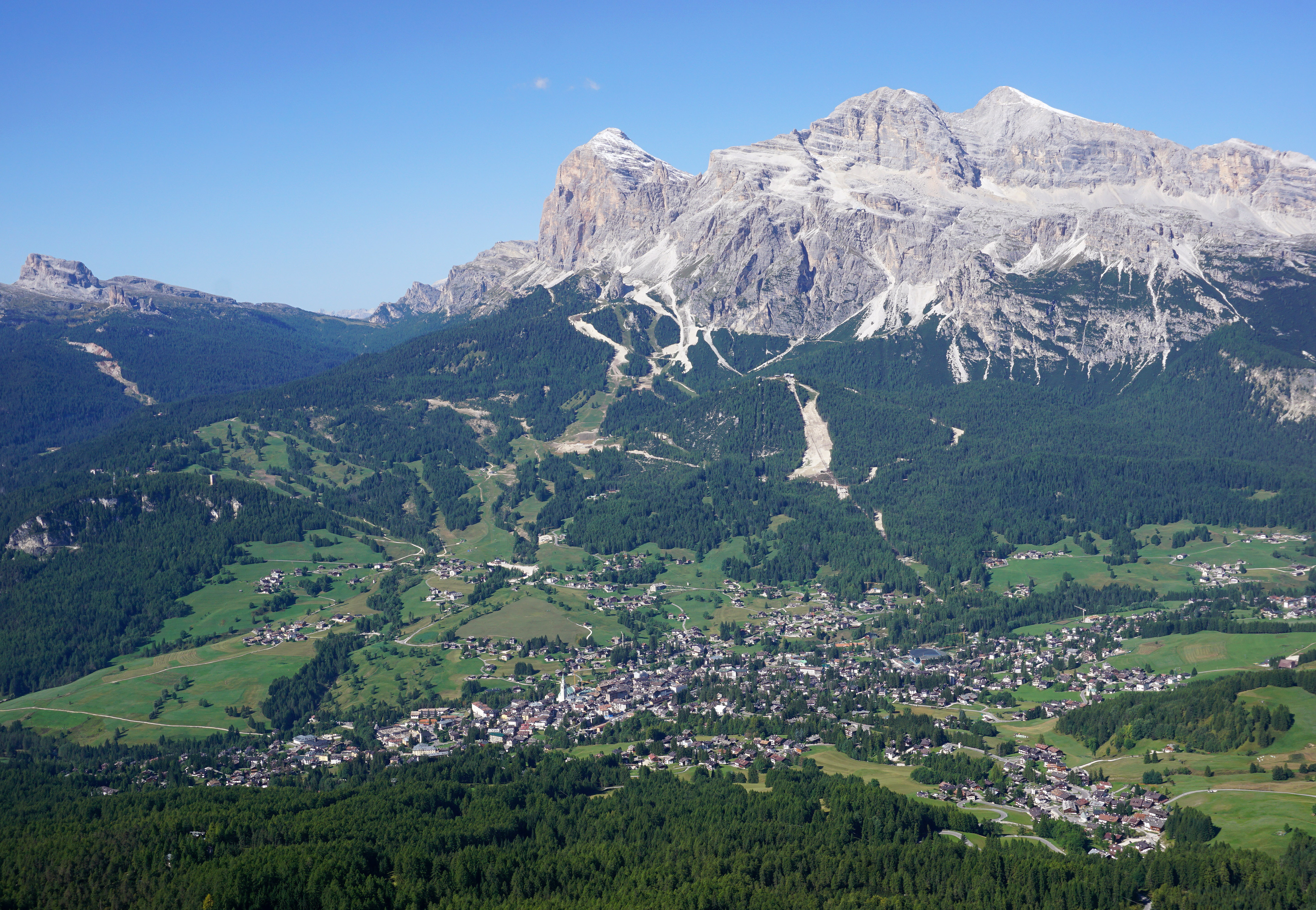
- Location: Olimpia delle Tofane
- Nearest major city: Cortina d'Ampezzo
- Vertical: 395 m (1,296 ft)
- Top elevation: 1,950 m (6,398 ft) AMSL
- Base elevation: 1,555 m (5,102 ft)
- Longest run: 1.300 km (0.81 mi)

The women's giant slalom competition of the 2026 Winter Olympics was held on Sunday, 15 February, at Olimpia delle Tofane in Cortina d'Ampezzo, Italy. Federica Brignone of Italy won the event, her second gold medal at the 2026 Games, with Sara Hector of Sweden, the defending champion, and Thea Louise Stjernesund of Norway sharing the silver medal. They had identical times in both runs. For Stjernesund, this was the first individual Olympic medal.

== Background ==
The defending champion, Sara Hector, qualified for the event, as did the 2022 silver medalist, Federica Brignone. The bronze medalist, Lara Gut-Behrami, missed the Olympics due to injury. Prior to the Olympics on the World Cup circuit, Mikaela Shiffrin led the overall and Julia Scheib the giant slalom standings. Brignone was the reigning world champion.

== Results ==
The first run of the race was started at 10:00 local time (UTC+1), and the second at 13:30, both under sunny skies. The first run's snow condition was icy; the air temperature was −5.8 °C (22 °F) at the starting gate and −2.7 °C (27 °F) at the finish area. With windier conditions in the afternoon, snow was hard for the second run; the air temperature was −3.9 °C (25 °F) at the starting gate and 0.3 °C (32.5 °F) at the finish area.

Rank	Bib	Name	Nation	Run 1	Rank	Run 2	Rank	Total	Behind
1st place, gold medalist(s)	14	Federica Brignone	Italy	1:03.23	1	1:10.27	14	2:13.50	—
2nd place, silver medalist(s)	1	Thea Louise Stjernesund	Norway	1:03.97	4	1:10.15	11	2:14.12	+0.62
2nd place, silver medalist(s)	2	Sara Hector	Sweden	1:03.97	4	1:10.15	11	2:14.12	+0.62
4	12	Lara Della Mea	Italy	1:04.42	15	1:09.75	4	2:14.17	+0.67
5	7	Julia Scheib	Austria	1:04.36	11	1:09.83	5	2:14.19	+0.69
6	21	Mina Fürst Holtmann	Norway	1:04.28	9	1:09.96	8	2:14.24	+0.74
7	13	Maryna Gąsienica-Daniel	Poland	1:04.39	13	1:09.86	7	2:14.25	+0.75
8	6	Alice Robinson	New Zealand	1:04.32	10	1:09.98	9	2:14.30	+0.80
9	16	Lena Dürr	Germany	1:03.57	2	1:10.74	24	2:14.31	+0.81
10	17	Sofia Goggia	Italy	1:03.69	3	1:10.68	23	2:14.37	+0.87
11	3	Mikaela Shiffrin	United States	1:04.25	7	1:10.17	13	2:14.42	+0.92
12	4	Camille Rast	Switzerland	1:04.37	12	1:10.12	10	2:14.49	+0.99
13	9	Valérie Grenier	Canada	1:04.26	8	1:10.32	16	2:14.58	+1.08
14	25	Asja Zenere	Italy	1:05.13	22	1:09.50	1	2:14.63	+1.13
15	5	Paula Moltzan	United States	1:04.39	14	1:10.38	17	2:14.77	+1.27
16	10	Lara Colturi	Albania	1:03.97	4	1:10.85	25	2:14.82	+1.32
17	8	Zrinka Ljutić	Croatia	1:05.34	24	1:09.67	3	2:15.01	+1.51
18	26	Nina Astner	Austria	1:04.47	16	1:10.61	21	2:15.08	+1.58
19	19	Emma Aicher	Germany	1:04.48	17	1:10.65	22	2:15.13	+1.63
20	11	Nina O'Brien	United States	1:05.81	29	1:09.50	1	2:15.31	+1.81
21	32	Hanna Aronsson Elfman	Sweden	1:05.50	27	1:09.85	6	2:15.35	+1.85
22	37	Doriane Escané	France	1:04.82	19	1:10.57	20	2:15.39	+1.89
23	27	Vanessa Kasper	Switzerland	1:05.34	23	1:10.48	19	2:15.82	+2.32
24	29	Sue Piller	Switzerland	1:05.56	28	1:10.29	15	2:15.85	+2.35
25	30	Madeleine Sylvester-Davik	Norway	1:05.49	26	1:10.43	18	2:15.92	+2.42
26	15	Britt Richardson	Canada	1:04.97	21	1:11.6	28	2:16.65	+3.15
27	24	Estelle Alphand	Sweden	1:06.02	30	1:11.37	26	2:17.39	+3.89
28	42	Justine Lamontagne	Canada	1:06.34	31	1:11.48	27	2:17.82	+4.32
29	33	Francesca Baruzzi Farriol	Argentina	1:06.83	36	1:12.32	29	2:19.15	+5.65
30	40	Gwyneth ten Raa	Luxembourg	1:06.60	34	1:12.85	30	2:19.45	+5.95
31	43	Caterina Sinigoi	Slovenia	1:07.10	38	1:13.36	31	2:20.46	+6.96
32	48	Elvedina Muzaferija	Bosnia and Herzegovina	1:06.83	36	1:13.84	32	2:20.67	+7.17
33	47	Madeleine Beck	Liechtenstein	1:07.08	37	1:13.87	34	2:20.95	+7.45
34	52	Phoebe Heaydon	Australia	1:07.33	39	1:13.85	33	2:21.18	+7.68
35	38	Noa Szőllős	Israel	1:06.73	35	1:15.00	38	2:21.73	+8.23
36	44	Nika Tomšič	Slovenia	1:07.54	40	1:14.35	35	2:21.89	+8.39
37	51	Alexandra Skorokhodova	Kazakhstan	1:08.82	43	1:14.49	36	2:23.31	+9.81
38	59	Alena Labaštová	Czech Republic	1:09.05	45	1:14.95	37	2:24.00	+10.50
39	46	Anastasiya Shepilenko	Ukraine	1:08.97	44	1:15.09	39	2:24.06	+10.56
40	67	Zita Tóth	Hungary	1:08.69	42	1:16.72	41	2:25.41	+11.91
41	66	Vanina Guerillot	Portugal	1:10.07	47	1:15.49	40	2:25.56	+12.06
42	31	Gim So-hui	South Korea	1:09.59	46	1:16.83	42	2:26.42	+12.92
43	65	Elín Elmarsdóttir Van Pelt	Iceland	1:10.28	48	1:16.93	43	2:27.21	+13.71
44	57	Semire Dauti	Albania	1:10.95	50	1:17.17	44	2:28.12	+14.62
45	62	Emma Gatcliffe	Trinidad and Tobago	1:10.48	49	1:17.71	46	2:28.19	+14.69
46	60	Sofia Maria Moldovan	Romania	1:12.46	55	1:17.41	45	2:29.87	+16.37
47	56	Lara Markthaler	South Africa	1:12.17	51	1:19.29	48	2:31.46	+17.96
48	63	Anabelle Zurbay	Ireland	1:12.82	56	1:18.88	47	2:31.70	+18.20
49	69	Nino Tsiklauri	Georgia	1:12.39	54	1:19.40	49	2:31.79	+18.29
50	76	Mialitiana Clerc	Madagascar	1:12.35	53	1:19.64	50	2:31.99	+18.49
51	70	Esma Alić	Bosnia and Herzegovina	1:14.48	57	1:21.35	51	2:35.83	+22.33
52	74	Tallulah Proulx	Philippines	1:17.15	58	1:24.47	52	2:41.62	+28.12
53	75	Maria Eleni Tsiovolou	Greece	1:17.44	59	1:24.47	52	2:41.91	+28.41
54	68	Zhang Yuying	China	1:22.49	60	1:30.72	54	2:53.21	+39.71
	20	Kajsa Vickhoff Lie	Norway	1:04.65	18	DNF	—N/a		
	22	Stephanie Brunner	Austria	1:04.97	20	DNF	—N/a		
	35	Camille Cerutti	France	1:05.98	29	DNF	—N/a		
	36	Lisa Hörhager	Austria	1:06.47	32	DNF	—N/a		
	39	Ana Bucik Jogan	Slovenia	1:05.35	25	DNF	—N/a		
	50	Piera Hudson	United Arab Emirates	1:08.01	41	DNF	—N/a		
	73	Sonja Lí Kristinsdóttir	Iceland	1:12.31	52	DNF	—N/a		
	23	AJ Hurt	United States	DNF	—N/a				
	28	Clara Direz	France	DNF	—N/a				
	34	Cassidy Gray	Canada	DNF	—N/a				
	41	Rebeka Jančová	Slovakia	DNF	—N/a				
	45	Anina Zurbriggen	Bulgaria	DNF	—N/a				
	53	Nicole Begue	Argentina	DNF	—N/a				
	54	Aruwin Salehhuddin	Malaysia	DNF	—N/a				
	55	Park Seo-yun	South Korea	DNF	—N/a				
	58	Pia Vučinić	Croatia	DNF	—N/a				
	61	Jana Atanasovska	North Macedonia	DNF	—N/a				
	64	Elisa Maria Negri	Czech Republic	DNF	—N/a				
	71	Neringa Stepanauskaitė	Lithuania	DNF	—N/a				
	72	Kiana Kryeziu	Kosovo	DNF	—N/a				
	49	Sarah Schleper	Mexico	DSQ	—N/a				
	18	Wendy Holdener	Switzerland	DNS	—N/a				
