= Emma Gatcliffe =

Canadian-Trinidadian alpine skier (born 2005)

Personal information
- Born: 14 July 2005 (age 21) Ontario, Canada

Skiing career
- Country: Trinidad and Tobago (since 2024–25); Canada (until 2023–24)
- Sport: Alpine skiing
- College team: St. Lawrence Saints
- Club: Georgian Peaks
- Disciplines: Slalom, giant slalom

Olympics
- Teams: 1 – (2026)
- Medals: 0

Emma Gatcliffe (born 14 July 2005) is a Canadian and Trinidadian alpine skier. She is the first female skier to represent Trinidad and Tobago at the Winter Olympics.

== Early life and education ==
Gatcliffe was born in Canada on 14 July 2005 to a Trinidadian father and a French-Canadian mother and holds dual citizenship. Her older brother, James, is also ski racer. She grew up in Clarksburg, Ontario and boarded at Green Mountain Valley School in Waitsfield, Vermont, where she was a member of the alpine ski, lacrosse, and soccer teams. She attends St. Lawrence University, where she is a member of the St. Lawrence Saints alpine ski team and Kappa Kappa Gamma sorority.

== Career ==
Gatcliffe started racing in FIS-level international events in December 2021 at the age of 16 while still under the auspices of Alpine Canada. She formally switched federations to the Trinidad and Tobago Snowsports Federation between the 2024 and 2025 seasons.

Her first major international competition was the 2025 Junior World Championships in Tarvisio, Italy, where her best finish was 48th in the giant slalom.

She represented Trinidad and Tobago at the 2026 Winter Olympics, competing in slalom and giant slalom. She served as her nation's flag-bearer, alongside Nikhil Alleyne, in the Parade of Nations during the 2026 Winter Olympics opening ceremony.

Her 2026 Olympic performances were praised by officials and coaches. In her home country her performances were regarded as "notable" and it was regarded as "another milestone" for the winter sports program of Trinidad, that is still in an early stage.

== Olympic results ==
Year
| Year | Age | Slalom | Giant slalom | Super-G | Downhill | Team combined |
| 2026 | 20 | DNF1 | 45 | — | — | — |
