= Quinn Wheeler =

United States Virgin Islands bobsledder (born 1974)

Personal information
- Nationality: American Virgin Islander
- Born: August 18, 1974 (age 51)

Sport
- Sport: Bobsleigh

Quinn Wheeler (born August 18, 1974) is a bobsledder who represented the United States Virgin Islands. He competed in the two-man event at the 2002 Winter Olympics.
