= Nikhil Alleyne =

Trinidadian alpine skier (born 2004)

Personal information
- Born: 12 September 2004 (age 21) California, United States

Skiing career
- Country: Trinidad and Tobago (since 2022); United States (until 2022)
- Sport: Alpine skiing
- College team: Middlebury Panthers
- Club: Sugar Bowl Academy
- Disciplines: Slalom, giant slalom

Olympics
- Teams: 1 – (2026)
- Medals: 0

Nikhil Alleyne (born 12 September 2004) is an American-Trinidadian alpine skier. He competed at the 2026 Winter Olympics, becoming the first male skier to represent Trinidad and Tobago at the Winter Olympics.

== Early life, training, and education ==
Alleyne was born in California in 2004 to a Trinidadian father and an Indian mother. He learned how to ski when he was two years old. He joined a development program in Tahoe, where his family went skiing every weekend. He trained, and competed for, the Sugar Bowl Academy in California as a teenager, but a torn labrum prevented him from being recruited for college teams.

He is a student at Middlebury College in Middlebury, Vermont.

== Career ==
Alleyne joined the Sugar Bowl Academy's post-graduate team, competing in International Ski and Snowboard Federation races.

He competed at the 2026 Winter Olympics, becoming the first male skier to represent Trinidad and Tobago at the Winter Olympics. He was a flagbearer for Trinidad and Tobago during the Parade of Nations at the 2026 Winter Olympics opening ceremony, alongside Emma Gatcliffe. He raced in the men's slalom and the men's giant slalom.

== Personal life ==
Alleyne is a dual citizen of the United States and Trinidad and Tobago.

== Olympic results ==
Year
Year	Age	Slalom	Giant slalom	Super-G	Downhill	Team combined
2026	21	DSQ1	52	—	—	—
