= Stefan Vasilev (bobsleigh) =

Bulgarian bobsledder

Personal information
- Nationality: Bulgarian
- Born: 8 September 1968 (age 56); Byala, Bulgaria

Sport
- Sport: Bobsleigh

Stefan Vasilev (Bulgarian: Стефан Василев, born 8 September 1968) is a Bulgarian bobsledder. He competed in the two man event at the 2002 Winter Olympics.
