= United Arab Emirates at the 2024 Winter Youth Olympics =

- Flag of United Arab Emirates
- IOC code: UAE
- NOC: United Arab Emirates National Olympic Committee

in Gangwon, South Korea 19 January 2024 – 1 February 2024
- Competitors: 2 in 2 sports
- Flag bearers (opening): Alexander Astridge & Amenah Almuhairi
- Flag bearer (closing): TBD
- Medals: Gold 0 Silver 0 Bronze 0 Total 0

Winter Youth Olympics appearances
- 2024

The United Arab Emirates is scheduled to compete at the 2024 Winter Youth Olympics in Gangwon, South Korea, from 19 January to 1 February 2024. This will be United Arab Emirates's debut appearance at any Winter Olympic event.

The United Arab Emirates team consisted of two athletes (one per gender) competing in two sports. Alpine skier Alexander Astridge and snowboarder Amenah Almuhairi were the country's flagbearers during the opening ceremony.

== Competitors ==
The following is the list of number of competitors (per gender) participating at the games per sport/discipline.

Sport	Men	Women	Total
Alpine skiing	1	0	1
Snowboarding	0	1	1
Total	1	1	2

== Alpine skiing ==
United Arab Emirates qualified one male alpine skier.

Men

Athlete	Event	Run 1		Run 2		Total	
Athlete	Event	Time	Rank	Time	Rank	Time	Rank
Alexander Astridge	Giant slalom	DNS					
Alexander Astridge	Slalom	58.44	57	1:07.06	38	2:05.50	38

== Snowboarding ==
The United Arab Emirates qualified one female snowboarder.

Halfpipe, Slopestyle & Big Air

Athlete	Event	Qualification				Final				
Athlete	Event	Run 1	Run 2	Best	Rank	Run 1	Run 2	Run 3	Best	Rank
Amenah Al-Muhairi	Women's big air	29.75	14.50	29.75	18	Did not advance				
Amenah Al-Muhairi	Women's slopestyle	4.00	6.00	6.00	19	Did not advance				

== See also ==
- United Arab Emirates at the 2024 Summer Olympics
- United Arab Emirates at the 2025 Asian Winter Games
