= Shinji Miura =

Japanese bobsledder (born 1975)

Personal information
- Nationality: Japanese
- Born: 26 August 1975 (age 49); Motoyoshi, Japan

Sport
- Sport: Bobsleigh

Shinji Miura (三浦 伸二, Miura Shinji, born 26 August 1975) is a Japanese bobsledder. He competed in the two man and the four man events at the 2002 Winter Olympics.
