= Uruguay at the 2026 Winter Olympics =

- Flag of Uruguay
- IOC code: URU
- NOC: Uruguayan Olympic Committee
- Website: www.cou.org.uy (in Spanish)

in Milan and Cortina d'Ampezzo, Italy 6 February 2026 – 22 February 2026
- Competitors: 1 (1 man) in 1 sport
- Flag bearer (opening): Nicolás Pirozzi
- Flag bearer (closing): Volunteer
- Medals: Gold 0 Silver 0 Bronze 0 Total 0

Winter Olympics appearances (overview)
- 1998; 2002–2022; 2026

Uruguay competed at the 2026 Winter Olympics in Milan and Cortina d'Ampezzo, Italy, from 6 to 22 February 2026. This was the country's second appearance at the Winter Olympic Games, 28 years after its debut in 1998. The Uruguayan delegation consisted of a single athlete Nicolás Pirozzi, who was the country's flagbearer during the opening ceremony. Uruguay did not win any medals in the Games.

== Background ==
The Uruguayan Olympic Committee was formed on 27 October 1923 and recognized by the International Olympic Committee (IOC) in the same year. Uruguay first competed at the Summer Olympics in the 1924 Summer Olympics. However, the nation made its first Winter Olympics appearance only at the 1998 Winter Olympics in Nagano. The 2026 Winter Olympics was only the second appearance for Uruguay at the Winter Olympics.

The 2026 Winter Olympics was held in Milan and Cortina d'Ampezzo, Italy, between 6 and 22 February 2026. Alpine skier Nicolás Pirozzi was Uruguay's flagbearer during the opening ceremony. As no Uruguayan athletes were present for the closing ceremony, a volunteer carried Uruguay's flag. Uruguay did not win a medal at the Games.

== Competitors ==
The Uruguayan team consisted of a single athlete competing in a single sport.

Sport	Men	Women	Total
Alpine skiing	1	0	1
Total	1	0	1

== Alpine skiing ==
As per the International Ski and Snowboard Federation (FIS), the basic qualification mark for the giant slalom and slalom events required a points average of less than 120 in the FIS points list, calculated on the basis of results between 1 July 2024 and 18 January 2026. Every NOC meeting the minimum basic standards was assigned one male and one female quota spot. Uruguay qualified one male alpine skier through the basic quota for the giant slalom and slalom events.

Alpine skier Nicolás Pirozzi represented the country. Pirozzi was the second ever athlete to represent the country at the Winter Olympics, after Gabriel Hottegindre in the same sport in the 1998 Winter Olympics. Pirozzi was born in Chile in 2002, to a Chilean father and a Uruguayan mother. He had earlier represented Chile in the 2020 Winter Youth Olympics, before switching allegiance to Uruguay.

The alpine skiing events were held at the Stelvio Ski Centre, Bormio. In the giant slalom event, Pirozzi complete his first run with a time of 1:22.99 and was placed 43rd amongst the 80 participants. In the second run, he improved to 1:15.66 and was ranked 35th. He was ranked 39th in the final classification with a combined time of 2:38.65. However, he did not complete his first run and was not classified in the final list in the slalom event.

Athlete	Event	Run 1		Run 2		Total	
Athlete	Event	Time	Rank	Time	Rank	Time	Rank
Nicolás Pirozzi	Men's giant slalom	1:22.99	43	1:15.66	35	2:38.65	39
Nicolás Pirozzi	Men's slalom	DNF					
