= United Arab Emirates at the 2026 Winter Olympics =

- Flag of the United Arab Emirates
- IOC code: UAE
- NOC: United Arab Emirates National Olympic Committee
- Website: olympic.ae (in Arabic)

in Milan and Cortina d'Ampezzo, Italy 6 February 2026 – 22 February 2026
- Competitors: 2 (1 man and 1 woman) in 1 sport
- Flag bearers (opening): Alexander Astridge & Piera Hudson
- Flag bearers (closing): Alexander Astridge & Piera Hudson
- Medals: Gold 0 Silver 0 Bronze 0 Total 0

Winter Olympics appearances (overview)
- 2026

The United Arab Emirates competed at the 2026 Winter Olympics in Milan and Cortina d'Ampezzo, Italy, which was held from 6 to 22 February 2026. This was the country's first time participating in the Winter Olympics.

The United Arab Emirates team consisted of two alpine skiers (one per gender), Alexander Astridge and Piera Hudson. The pair were also the country's flagbearer during the closing ceremony.

Astridge and Hudson were the country's flagbearers during the opening ceremony. Astridge has lived in Dubai most of his life and Hudson moved there from New Zealand.

== Competitors ==
The following is the list of number of competitors participating at the Games per sport/discipline.

| Sport | Men | Women | Total |
|---|---|---|---|
| Alpine skiing | 1 | 1 | 2 |
| Total | 1 | 1 | 2 |

== Alpine skiing ==
The United Arab Emirates qualified one female and one male alpine skier through the basic quota.

| Athlete | Event | Run 1 | | Run 2 | | Total | |
| Athlete | Event | Time | Rank | Time | Rank | Time | Rank |
|---|---|---|---|---|---|---|---|
| Alexander Astridge | Men's slalom | DNF | | | | | |
| Piera Hudson | Women's giant slalom | 1:08.01 | 41 | DNF | | | |
| Piera Hudson | Women's slalom | 52.74 | 48 | 56.93 | 39 | 1:49.67 | 39 |

== See also ==
- United Arab Emirates at the 2024 Winter Youth Olympics
