= Chris Brown (explorer) =

British explorer (born 1962)

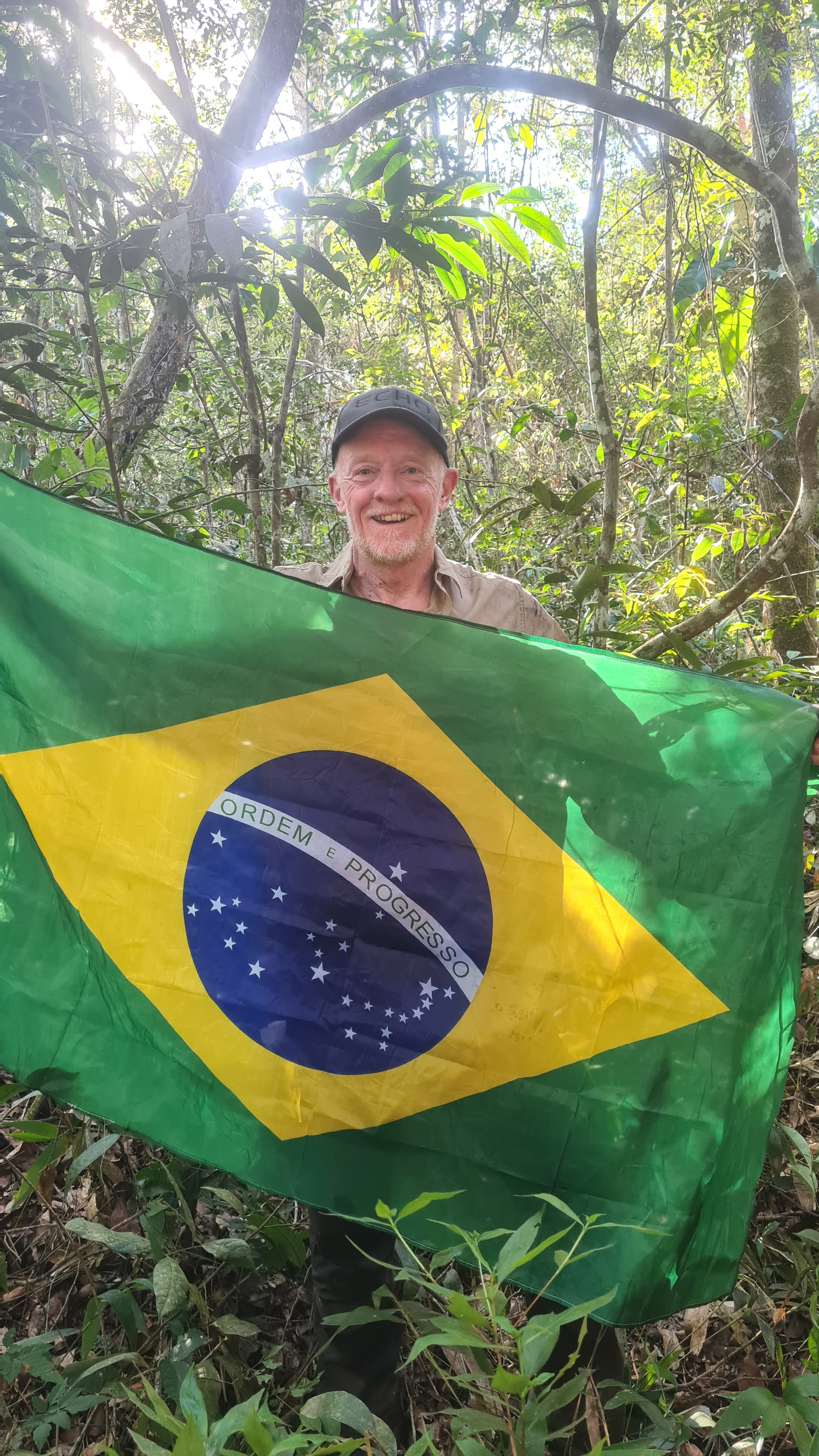
- Brown at the South American POI in Brazil, 2023
- Born: 1962 (age 63–64)
- Education: Durham University, Heriot-Watt University
- Occupations: Entrepreneur, explorer, adventurer
- Children: Axel Brown; Mika Brown
- Website: brown.co.uk

Chris Brown (born 1962) is a British explorer and adventurer known for his bid to become the first person in history to visit all eight of the Earth's Continental Poles of Inaccessibility. To date, he has reached seven of the eight poles. Brown holds a Guinness World Record for the most race dives into a swimming pool in one hour and has been elected as a Lifelong Honorary Fellow of the Scientific Exploration Society. He is also the father of Olympic bobsleigh athlete Axel Brown.

== Early life ==
Born in Guisborough, North Yorkshire, Brown attended Stokesley Comprehensive School and King James's School in Knaresborough. He went on to study physics at Durham University, earning a Bachelor of Science degree, followed by a Master of Engineering in Petroleum Engineering from Heriot-Watt University. Brown began his career as a petroleum engineer with BP before establishing his own publishing company, Take That Limited, in 1987. In 1988, Brown was elected a Member and Chartered Physicist of the Institute of Physics.

== First adventures ==
Brown, a tech entrepreneur from Harrogate, North Yorkshire, first got the "travel bug" while backpacking through South America as a student.

Brown's idea to visit the Poles of Inaccessibility – the locations on Earth farthest away from the ocean, or, in the case of the Oceanic Pole of Inaccessibility and Northern Pole of Inaccessibility, land – first emerged during a trip to Antarctica in 2016. On this adventure, Brown learned about the various South Poles while travelling alongside former American astronaut Buzz Aldrin, who was attempting to become the oldest person to reach the South Pole.

Two years later, in 2018, this idea was cemented while attending the "world's highest dinner party" on Mount Everest, organised to raise funds for UK charity Community Action Nepal. During the visit, Brown heard about the Seven Summits Challenge, where people climb the highest mountains on each of the seven continents. Brown thought to try the same type of challenge for the Poles of Inaccessibility, marking the beginning of Brown's Eight Poles Project.

== Eight Poles Project ==
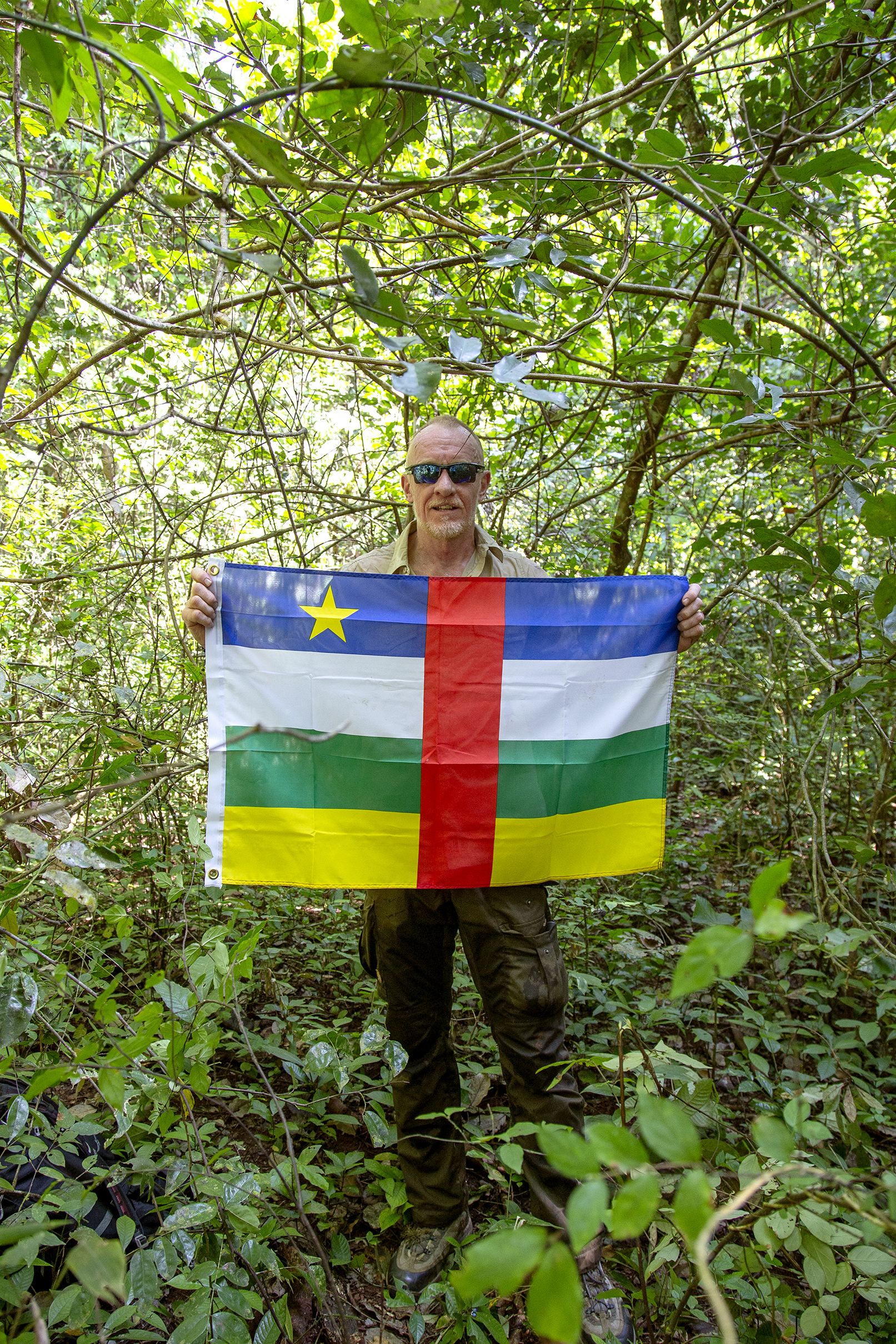
British explorer Chris Brown at the African Pole of Inaccessibility in the Central African Republic (CAR) in December 2021.

Brown's aim with the Eight Poles Project is to be the first person to visit all of the Poles of Inaccessibility. These comprise Eurasia's Pole of Inaccessibility, Africa's Pole of Inaccessibility, Australia's Pole of Inaccessibility, Northern Pole of Inaccessibility, Southern Pole of Inaccessibility, North American Pole of Inaccessibility, South American Pole of Inaccessibility, and the Oceanic Pole of Inaccessibility/Point Nemo.

As of June 2026, he has visited seven of the eight poles.

== Expeditions ==
North American Pole of Inaccessibility

Brown's first successful venture in the Eight Poles Project was reaching the North American Pole of Inaccessibility, on land belonging to the Oglala Sioux Tribe in South Dakota, on 19 July 2019, accompanied by his son Axel Brown.

African Pole of Inaccessibility

A team of Chris Brown, Catherine Vinton, Jacob Johnson and Larry Reeves became the first recorded people to reach the African Pole of Inaccessibility on 7 December 2021. The team flew from Bangui, the capital of Central African Republic, to Obo the nearest settlement to the pole. The group were accompanied on the trek through the triple-canopy jungle by four members of FACA (Forces armées centrafricaines) in this very dangerous part of Africa close to the country's tripoint with South Sudan and the Democratic Republic of the Congo.

Australian Pole of Inaccessibility

Chris Brown, Kimberley Morgan, Simika Best and station-manager Terry reached the Pole of Inaccessibility for Australia on 11 May 2022 with kind permission of Hewitt Cattle, the owners of Derwent Cattle Station in Australia's Northern Territory, northwest of Alice Springs. On the same expedition, they visited the Australian Centre of Gravity (Geographical Centre) and the Australian Mainland Centre which, unusually, are in close proximity to one another.

Southern Pole of Inaccessibility

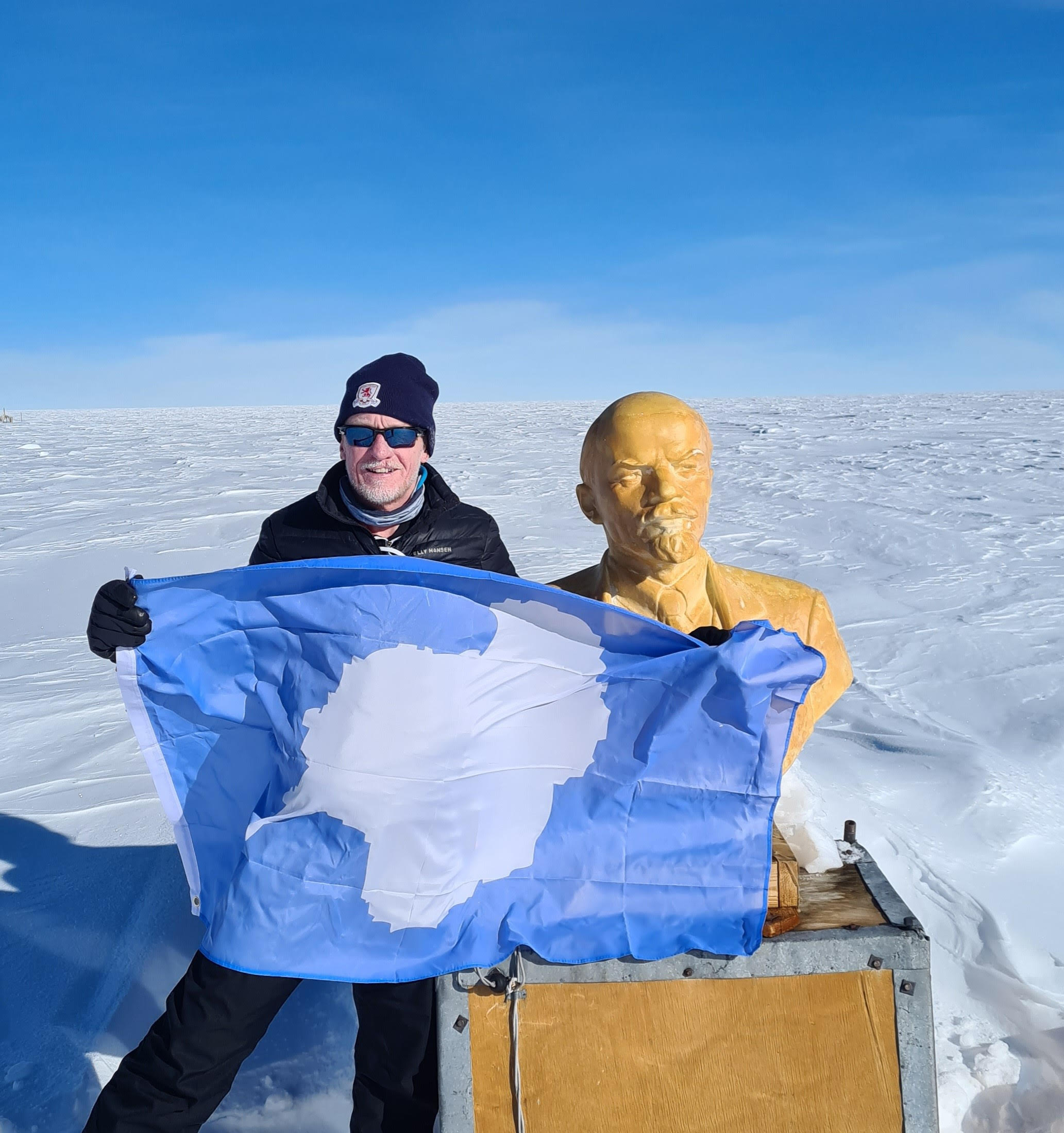
British explorer Chris Brown at the Southern Pole of Inaccessibility in January 2023.

Chris Brown, Mika Brown and Catherine Vinton first attempted to reach the Southern Pole of Inaccessibility, or the Pole of Inaccessibility for Antarctica, in December 2021. The expedition suffered several technical setbacks with their Twin Otter aircraft and became stranded in a sequence of four Antarctic storms with precipitation and winds of 120 mph. After 28 days the expedition was abandoned.

Brown and his son Mika returned the following year and this time the plan went to schedule. On 11 January 2023, they first visited the traditional Southern Pole of Inaccessibility at the Soviet Union research station where they found that just the head and shoulders of the Lenin Bust and a non-functioning weather mast are all that remain above the ice. They then moved on to the British Antarctic Survey defined Southern Pole of Inaccessibility at 82°53′14″S 55°4′30″E, which is the current best estimate for the Pole not taking into account Ice Shelves.

South American Pole of Inaccessibility

On 29 May 2023, a small team of Chris Brown, Larry Reeves and Adam Barwell reached the South American Pole of Inaccessibility in the Matto Grosso region of Arenápolis, Brazil. At the exact coordinates they found an old machete stuck in the ground marking the point.

Oceanic Pole of Inaccessibility (Point Nemo)

In March 2024, Brown, again accompanied by Mika, reached the Oceanic Pole of Inaccessibility at Point Nemo, located in the South Pacific Ocean between New Zealand and Chile, and 1,670 miles (2,688 km) from land. Setting sail on the chartered expedition yacht Hanse Explorer from Puerto Montt in Chile on March 12, they reached the pole on March 20.

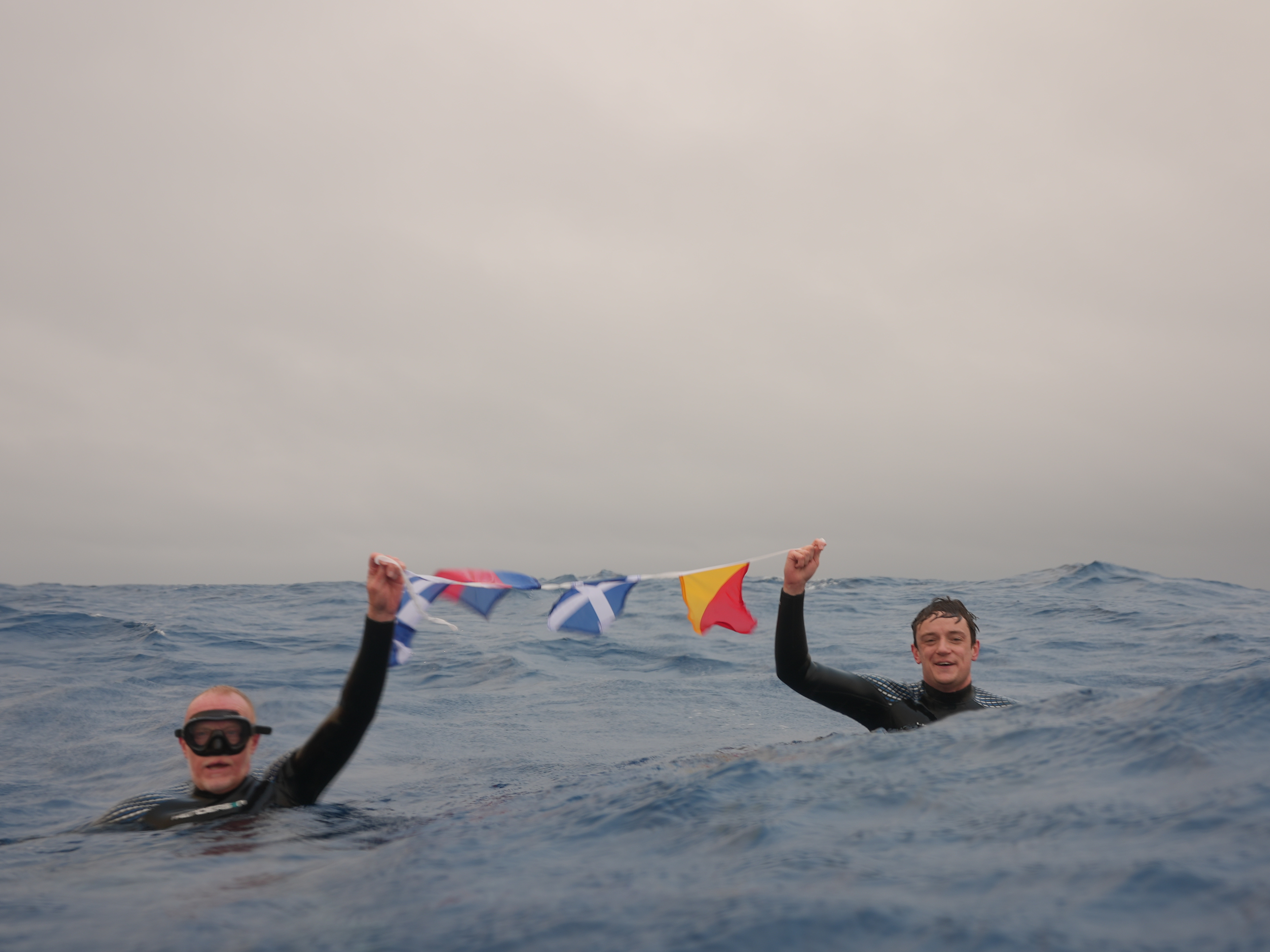
British explorer Chris Brown and his son, Mika, at the Oceanic Pole of Inaccessibility (Point Nemo) in March 2024.

At the exact coordinates, Brown and Mika jumped into the water to become the first recorded people to swim at Point Nemo, accompanied by Videographer Adam Watson and overseen by Doug Shields. The team also visited the two alternative locations for Point Nemo, as calculated by Croatian survey engineer Hrvoje Lukatela for the avoidance of doubt that humans have now visited the exact location of Point Nemo.

Northern Pole of Inaccessibility

Brown visited the Arctic Pole of Inaccessibility on the 18th of September 2025. He also visited the Magnetic North Pole and the regular North Pole on the same expedition.

Following a failed attempt to reach the Arctic Pole, or the Northern Pole of Inaccessibility as it is also known, on foot in 2019, he went on to make a successful second attempt six years later. Brown reached the pole on Le Commandant Charcot, a hybrid-electric, LNG-powered icebreaker operated by French company Ponant.

Brown was not able to disembark at the Northern Pole of Inaccessibility due to the location being open water at the time, so instead he sailed on the icebreaker through the exact coordinates - 85°48′N, 176°09′E - and was able to record himself just four metres away from the exact spot which is well within the recognised margin of error of 1km.

== Titanic sub ==
In 2023, in the wake of the Titan submersible implosion, Brown revealed that he had paid a deposit for a place aboard the OceanGate vessel but had subsequently pulled out over concerns about its safety. He was a friend of British billionaire Hamish Harding, who died on the sub.
