= Steve Anderhub =

Swiss bobsledder (born 1970)

Personal information
- Born: Stefan Anderhub; 12 July 1970 (age 55) Luzern, Switzerland
Medal record
Men's Bobsleigh
Representing Switzerland
Olympic Games
Silver medal – second place	2002 Salt Lake City	Two-man
World Championships
Bronze medal – third place	2001 St. Moritz	Four-man

Stefan "Steve" Anderhub (born 12 July 1970) is a Swiss bobsledder who won a silver medal at the 2002 Winter Olympics in the two-man event with teammate Christian Reich.

== Career ==
Anderhub primarily competed in the late 1990s into the early 2000s. He represented Switzerland at both the 1998 and again at the 2002 Winter Olympics in Salt Lake City. In 2002, Anderhub won silver in the two-man event alongside his teammate Christian Reich. The pair also won gold in the two-man race at the 2002 European Bobsleigh Championships in Cortina d'Ampezzo.

Anderhub won a bronze medal in the four-man event at the 2001 FIBT World Championships in St. Moritz.

In addition to bobsled, Anderhub is an accomplished gymnast who was Swiss National Champion in 1991, 1996 and 2002.

== After competition ==
Anderhub opened a footwear store in Luzern in 2004, after retiring from elite level competition. He now owns a second store in the Swiss capital, Bern.
