= Trinidad and Tobago at the 2026 Winter Olympics =

- Flag of Trinidad and Tobago
- IOC code: TTO
- NOC: Trinidad and Tobago Olympic Committee
- Website: www.ttoc.org

in Milan and Cortina d'Ampezzo, Italy 6 February 2026 – 22 February 2026
- Competitors: 6 (5 men and 1 woman) in 2 sports
- Flag bearers (opening): Nikhil Alleyne & Emma Gatcliffe
- Flag bearer (closing): De Aundre John
- Medals: Gold 0 Silver 0 Bronze 0 Total 0

Winter Olympics appearances (overview)
- 1994; 1998; 2002; 2006–2018; 2022; 2026

Trinidad and Tobago competed at the 2026 Winter Olympics in Milan and Cortina d'Ampezzo, Italy, from 6 to 22 February 2026. It was the country's fifth appearance at the Winter Olympics, since its debut at the 1994 Winter Olympics in Lillehammer. The Trinidad and Tobago delegation consisted of six athletes competing in two sports. It did not win any medals at the Games.

== Background ==
The Trinidad and Tobago Olympic Committee was recognized by the International Olympic Committee (IOC) in 1948. Trinidad and Tobago made its first Olympic appearance at the 1948 Summer Olympics in London, and its Winter Olympics debut at the 1994 Winter Olympics in Lillehammer. The 2022 Winter Olympics was the nation's fifth appearance at the Winter Olympics.

The 2026 Winter Olympics was held in Milan and Cortina d'Ampezzo, Italy, from 6 to 22 February 2026. Alpine skiers Nikhil Alleyne and Emma Gatcliffe were the country's flagbearer during the opening ceremony. Meanwhile, bobsledder De Aundre John was the country's flagbearer during the closing ceremony. Trinidad and Tobago did not win a medal at the Games.

== Competitors ==
The Trinidad and Tobago team consisted of six athletes competing in two sports.

| Sport | Men | Women | Total |
|---|---|---|---|
| Alpine skiing | 1 | 1 | 2 |
| Bobsleigh | 4 | 0 | 4 |
| Total | 5 | 1 | 6 |

== Alpine skiing ==
As per the International Ski and Snowboard Federation (FIS), the basic qualification mark for the slalom event required a points average of less than 120 in the FIS points list, calculated on the basis of results between 1 July 2024 and 18 January 2026. Every NOC meeting the minimum basic standards was assigned one male and one female quota spot. Trinidad and Tobago qualified one male and one female alpine skier through the basic quota for the slalom and giant slalom events. The country qualified in the sport for the first time ever.

Alpine skiing events were held at the Stelvio Ski Centre, Bormio. Nikhil Alleyne, who was born in California, competed in the men's events. In the giant slalom event, he finished 52nd out of the 80 competitions. He did not finish the giant slalom event.

| Athlete | Event | Run 1 | | Run 2 | | Total | |
| Athlete | Event | Time | Rank | Time | Rank | Time | Rank |
|---|---|---|---|---|---|---|---|
| Nikhil Alleyne | Men's giant slalom | 1:27.79 | 59 | 1:19.93 | 50 | 2:47.72 | 52 |
| Nikhil Alleyne | Men's slalom | DSQ | | | | | |
| Emma Gatcliffe | Women's giant slalom | 1:10.48 | 49 | 1:17.71 | 46 | 2:28.19 | 45 |
| Emma Gatcliffe | Women's slalom | DNF | | | | | |

== Bobsleigh ==
As per the International Bobsleigh & Skeleton Federation, a maximum of 170 quota spots were available to athletes to compete at the games including 114 for men and 56 for women. The qualification was based on the combined ranking list of the 2025/2026 season until the deadline of 18 January 2026. Pilots must have competed in eight different races on three different tracks between 1 October 2024 and 18 January 2026, and should have been ranked in at least five of those races. Additionally, the pilot must been ranked among the top 50 for the man's events or top 40 for the women's events. Trinidad and Tobago qualified two sleds (two-man, and four-man).

Axel Brown and De Aundre John competed in both the Two-man and Four-man events. Shakeel John and Xaverri Williams were the other members of the four-man team. This was the second Olympic participation for Brown and Shakeel John, while the others made their Olympic debut. Brown, whose mother is from Trinidad and Tobago and father is British, had represented Great Britain in other sporting events in the past.

The bobsleigh events were held at the Cortina Sliding Centre in Cortina d'Ampezzo between 15 and 22 February 2026. In the men's events, the two-man team of Brown and De Aundre John finished last out of 25 teams, and did not advance to the final run. The four-man team were ranked last of the 27 teams in the first run. They however did not finish the second run, and did not advance to the final run.

| Athlete | Event | Run 1 | | Run 2 | | Run 3 | | Run 4 | | Total | |
| Athlete | Event | Time | Rank | Time | Rank | Time | Rank | Time | Rank | Time | Rank |
|---|---|---|---|---|---|---|---|---|---|---|---|
| Axel Brown*; De Aundre John | Two-man | 57.22 | 25 | 56.97 | 25 | 56.86 | 25 | Did not advance | | 2:51.05 | 25 |
| Axel Brown*; De Aundre John; Shakeel John; Xaverri Williams | Four-man | 55.72 | 27 | Did not finish | | – | | – | | – | |
