= Andrew McNeilly =

Trinidad and Tobago bobsledder (born 1972)

Andrew Raymond McNeilly (born February 1972) is a Trinidad and Tobago bobsledder. He competed for Trinidad and Tobago at the 2002 Winter Olympics.

== Early life ==
McNeilly was born in Toronto, Ontario, Canada and is of Trinidad and Tobago descent.
