= Cristian La Grassa =

Italian bobsledder (born 1974)

Personal information
- Nationality: Italian
- Born: 1 August 1974 (age 50); Palermo, Italy

Sport
- Sport: Bobsleigh

Cristian La Grassa (born 1 August 1974) is an Italian bobsledder. He competed in the two man event at the 2002 Winter Olympics.
