= Miroslav Danov =

Bulgarian bobsledder (born 1979)

Personal information
- Nationality: Bulgarian
- Born: 30 September 1979 (age 45); Vratsa, Bulgaria

Sport
- Sport: Bobsleigh

Miroslav Danov (Bulgarian: Мирослав Данов, born 30 September 1979) is a Bulgarian bobsledder. He competed in the two man event at the 2002 Winter Olympics.
