= Errol Aguilera =

Trinidad and Tobago bobsledder (born 1978)

Personal information
- Nationality: Trinidad and Tobago
- Born: 24 May 1978 (age 47) Port of Spain, Trinidad and Tobago

Sport
- Sport: Bobsleigh

Errol Aguilera (born 24 May 1978) is a Trinidad and Tobago bobsledder. He competed in the two man event at the 2002 Winter Olympics.
