= Luis Carrasco (skeleton racer) =

Mexican skeleton racer (born 1963)

Luis Andrés Carrasco
Personal information
- Born: October 2, 1963 (age 62) Mérida, Yucatán, Mexico

Sport
- Country: Mexico
- Sport: Skeleton
- Turned pro: 1994
- Retired: 2002

Luis Andrés Carrasco (born October 2, 1963, in Mérida, Yucatán) is a Mexican skeleton racer who competed from 1994 to 2002. He finished 25th in the men's skeleton event at the 2002 Winter Olympics in Salt Lake City.

Carrasco's best finish at the FIBT World Championships was 27th in the men's skeleton event at Lake Placid, New York, in 1997.
