= Nicolás Pirozzi =

Uruguayan-Chilean skier (born 2002)

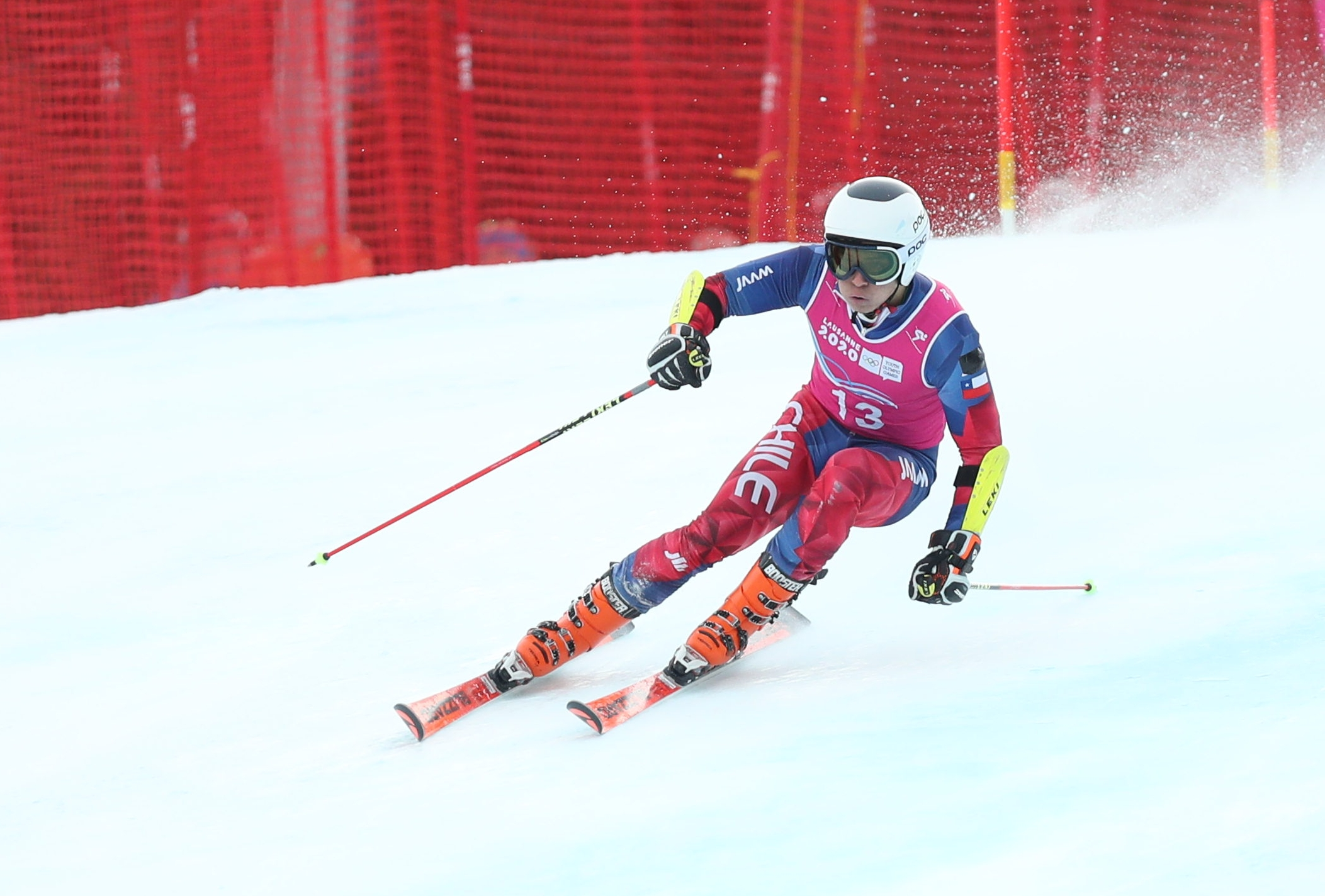
- Pirozzi in 2020

Personal information
- Born: 12 February 2002 (age 24) Chile

Skiing career
- Country: Uruguay (since 2024–25); Chile (until 2023–24)
- Sport: Alpine skiing
- Disciplines: Slalom, giant slalom

Olympics
- Teams: 1 – (2026)
- Medals: 0

World Championships
- Teams: 1 – (2021)
- Medals: 0

Nicolás Pirozzi (born 12 February 2002) is an alpine ski racer who represents Uruguay and specializes in the slalom and giant slalom events. He was born in Chile to a Chilean father and a Uruguayan mother, and represented Chile in international competitions until 2023-24, when he switched allegiance to Uruguay. In 2026, he became the second Uruguayan athlete after Gabriel Hottegindre to participate in the Winter Olympics.

== Personal life ==
Nicolás Pirozzi was born in Chile on 12 February 2002. He was the youngest of five children, born to a Chilean father and a Uruguayan mother from Salto, who met while pursuing a master's degree in Naples, Italy.

== Career ==
Pirozzi made his international debut for Chile on 26 July 2018 in a International Ski and Snowboard Federation (FIS) giant slalom event at El Colorado. On 26 August 2018, he finished seventh in the giant slalom event in the South American Cup event held in Las Lenas in Argentina. He competed in his first major international event at the 2020 Winter Youth Olympics, where he represented Chile in four events, and achieved Chile's best result till date, placing 14th in the giant slalom. In March 2021, he competed in the FIS Junior World Ski Championships held at Narvik in Norway.

In September 2021, Pirozzi won his first podium result when he finished second and third in the giant slalom and slalom events at the National Junior Championships. In the 2022-23 season, he obtained top 10 finishes at various FIS events. In August 2022, in the South American Cup, he won his first gold medal in the giant slalom event held at Chapelco in Argentina. He followed that up with another podium finish at the next event of the South American Cup in El Colorado held next week.

At the end of the 2023–2024 season, Pirozzi switched national teams, representing Uruguay from that point forward. In October 2025, he obtained first place finishes in both slalom and giant slalom events at the FIS event held at Valle Nevado. In 2026, Pirozzi became the second Uruguayan skier after Gabriel Hottegindre to qualify for the Winter Olympics.

At the 2026 Olympics, in the giant slalom event, Pirozzi complete his first run with a time of 1:22.99 and was placed 43rd amongst the 80 participants. In the second run, he improved to 1:15.66 and was ranked 35th. He was ranked 39th in the final classification with a combined time of 2:38.65. However, he did not complete his first run and was not classified in the final list in the slalom event.

== Key results ==
Year	Event	Run 1		Run 2		Total	
Year	Event	Time	Rank	Time	Rank	Time	Rank
2026 Winter Olympics	Men's giant slalom	1:22.99	43	1:15.66	35	2:38.65	39
2026 Winter Olympics	Men's slalom	DNF					
2021 World Ski Championships	Men's giant slalom	1:25.09	38	1:26.14	29	2:51.23	29
2021 World Ski Championships	Men's slalom	DNF					
