= Roberto Lauderdale =

Mexican bobsledder (born 1981)

Personal information
- Nationality: Mexican
- Born: 20 May 1981 (age 44)

Sport
- Sport: Bobsleigh

Roberto Lauderdale (born 20 May 1981) is a Mexican bobsledder. He competed in the two man event at the 2002 Winter Olympics.
