= Singapore at the 2026 Winter Olympics =

- Flag of Singapore
- IOC code: SGP
- NOC: Singapore National Olympic Council
- Website: singaporeolympics.com

in Milan and Cortina d'Ampezzo, Italy 6 February 2026 – 22 February 2026
- Competitors: 1 (1 man) in 1 sport
- Flag bearer (opening): Faiz Basha
- Flag bearer (closing): Faiz Basha
- Medals: Gold 0 Silver 0 Bronze 0 Total 0

Winter Olympics appearances (overview)
- 2018; 2022; 2026

Singapore competed at the 2026 Winter Olympics in Milan and Cortina d'Ampezzo, Italy, which was held from 6 to 22 February 2026. It was the country's first participation in the Winter Olympics since 2018.

Alpine skier Faiz Basha was the country's flagbearer during the opening ceremony. Meanwhile, Basha was also the country's flagbearer during the closing ceremony.

== Competitors ==
The following is the list of number of competitors participating at the Games per sport/discipline.

Sport	Men	Women	Total
Alpine skiing	1	0	1
Total	1	0	1

== Alpine skiing ==
Singapore qualified one male alpine skier through the basic quota. Singapore was represented by Faiz Basha at the Games.

Athlete	Event	Run 1		Run 2		Total	
Athlete	Event	Time	Rank	Time	Rank	Time	Rank
Faiz Basha	Men's giant slalom	DNF					
Faiz Basha	Men's slalom	1:11.53	40	1:08.92	35	2:20.45	35
