= De Aundre John =

Trinidadian bobsledder (born 2002)

Personal information
- Nationality: Trinidadian
- Born: 10 April 2002 (age 24)
- Height: 186 cm (6 ft 1 in)
- Weight: 82 kg (181 lb)

Sport
- Country: Trinidad and Tobago
- Sport: Bobsleigh
- Events: Two-man, Four-man

De Aundre John (born 10 April 2002) is a Trinidadian bobsledder. He represented Trinidad and Tobago at the 2026 Winter Olympics. John was the flagbearer for Trinidad and Tobago at the closing ceremonies at the 2026 games.

== Career ==
Prior to bobsleigh, John was a sprinter in track and field competition. John moved to bobsleigh in 2023, pushing for Axel Brown at a Bobsleigh World Cup event at Innsbruck. In 2025, John pushed for Brown's teams that earned Trinidad and Tobago's first competitive medals in bobsleigh in the North American Cup.

John represented Trinidad and Tobago at the 2026 Winter Olympics, pushing for the team of Axel Brown in both two-man and four-man. In two-man, the team finished 25th. In four-man, the team crashed on their second run, and did not finish the event.

== Bobsleigh results ==
All results are sourced from the International Bobsleigh and Skeleton Federation (IBSF).

=== Olympic Games ===
Event	Two-man	Four-man
(Italy) 2026 Milano Cortina	25th	DNF
