= Piera Hudson =

New Zealand-Emirati alpine skier

Personal information
- Born: 7 February 1996 (age 30) Hastings, New Zealand
- Website: piera.co.nz

Skiing career
- Country: United Arab Emirates (since 2025-26); New Zealand (until 2024-25)
- Sport: Alpine skiing
- Club: Wanaka Ski and Snowsports Club
- Disciplines: Slalom, giant slalom, super-G
- World Cup debut: 21 February 2015 (age 19)

Olympics
- Teams: 1 – (2026)
- Medals: 0

World Championships
- Teams: 5 – (2013–2021)

World Cup
- Seasons: 9 – (2015–2023)
- Podiums: 0
- Overall titles: 0 – (127th in 2019)
- Discipline titles: 0 – (55th in SL, 2019)

Piera Hudson (Arabic: بييرا هدسون; born 7 February 1996) is an alpine ski racer. Until the 2024–2025 season she competed for New Zealand and since 2025 she has represented the United Arab Emirates.

== Career ==
Piera Hudson was born in Hastings, raised on a farm near Tikokino, and attended Woodford House school in Havelock North, all places in Hawke's Bay, New Zealand.

Hudson went to the first ever Youth Olympics in Innsbruck, Austria in 2012. She later competed in the slalom at the 2015 World Championships in Beaver Creek, USA.

Hudson is a five-time winner of the New Zealand Giant Slalom National Championship title (2011, 2014, 2015, 2016, 2018) including at the age of 15 in her first year of FIS. She is also a three-time winner (2014, 2015 and 2018) of the New Zealand Slalom National Championship title held annually at Coronet Peak. Hudson has also twice won the New Zealand Super G National Championship title (2013, 2016) held at Mt Hutt.

Hudson has won the Australia New Zealand Cup (ANC) Giant Slalom Yellow Bib twice (2015 and 2016), Slalom Yellow Bib three times (2016, 2018, 2019) and the Super G Yellow Bib once in 2017. She has won the overall ANC Yellow Bib three times (2016, 2018, 2019). The yellow bib is awarded to the top performing Australian and New Zealand female competitors from the ANC series races held in Australia and New Zealand. The yellow bib secures an athlete a spot on the World Cup circuit as well a top 31 start position on the Europa Cup and NorAm circuit for the northern hemisphere season.

In November 2018 Hudson finished 26th in the World Cup slalom at Killington, Vermont, USA. As a result Hudson was the first New Zealand Alpine skier to score World Cup points since Claudia Riegler in 2003.

In December 2018 Hudson competed in eight Far East Cup races held at two different venues in China. Hudson won a giant slalom, and placed third in a slalom at Wanlong Resort. She then won three consecutive races (one in slalom, two in giant slalom) at Taiwoo Resort the following week. The three giant slalom victories are career best FIS Point results. Hudson finished 8th overall and 6th in giant slalom for the 2019 season in the Far East Cup.

In June 2025, Hudson attempted to change nations, wanting to represent the United Arab Emirates from the 2025–2026 season on. The request was formally denied, as Hudson was unable to provide proof that she had residency in the UAE as well as providing a passport. On 24 September 2025 the International Ski and Snowboard Federation (FIS) approved the nation change. She represented United Arab Emirates at the 2026 Winter Olympics, in the country's first ever Winter Olympics team.

== World Cup results ==
=== Season standings ===
Season
| Season | Age | Overall | Slalom | Giant slalom | Super-G | Downhill | Combined |
| 2019 | 23 | 127 | 55 | — | — | — | — |

== World Championships results ==
Year
| Year | Age | Slalom | Giant slalom | Super-G | Downhill | Combined | Parallel | Team event |
| 2013 | 17 | DNF1 | DSQ2 | DNS1 | — | — | —N/a | — |
| 2015 | 19 | 39 | DNS1 | — | — | — | —N/a | — |
| 2017 | 21 | DNF1 | DNF2 | — | — | — | —N/a | — |
| 2019 | 23 | DNF1 | DNF2 | — | — | — | —N/a | — |
| 2021 | 25 | DNF2 | DNF1 | — | — | — | 12 | — |

== Olympic results ==
Year
| Year | Age | Slalom | Giant slalom | Super-G | Downhill | Team combined |
| 2026 | 30 | 39 | DNF2 | — | — | — |
