= Curtis Harry =

Trinidad bobsledder

Personal information
- Nationality: Trinidad and Tobago
- Born: 23 May 1962 (age 62); Port of Spain, Trinidad and Tobago

Sport
- Sport: Bobsleigh

Curtis Harry (born 23 May 1962) is a Trinidad and Tobago bobsledder. He competed at the 1994 Winter Olympics and the 1998 Winter Olympics. He was also the flag bearer for Trinidad and Tobago at the 1998 Winter Olympics.
