= Roberto Tamés =

Mexican bobsledder (born 1964)

Personal information
- Born: 21 August 1964 (age 60); Guadalajara, Mexico

Sport
- Sport: Bobsleigh

Roberto Tamés (born 21 August 1964) is a Mexican bobsledder. He competed at the 1988, 1992 and the 2002 Winter Olympics.
