= Faiz Basha =

Singaporean alpine skier (born 2002)

Personal information
- Born: Faiz Basha Munwar Basha; February 28, 2002 (age 24) Singapore

Skiing career
- Country: Singapore
- Sport: Alpine skiing
- Club: Singapore Ski Snowboard Association
- Disciplines: Giant slalom, slalom

Olympics
- Teams: 1 – (2026)
- Medals: 0

World Championships
- Teams: 1 – (2025)
- Medals: 0
- Updated on 15 February 2026

Faiz Basha Munwar Basha (born February 28, 2002) is a Singaporean alpine skier, competing primarily in the slalom and giant slalom.

== Career ==
Basha originally attempted to qualify for the 2020 Winter Youth Olympics, but an injury prevented him from qualification. Basha would also fail to qualify for the 2022 Winter Olympics due to National Service requirements.

Basha represented Singapore at the 2025 Asian Winter Games, finishing 12th in the slalom event.

In 2025, Basha qualified to compete for Singapore at the 2026 Winter Olympics, becoming the first skier from Singapore to compete at the Winter Olympics.

== World Championship results ==
Year
Year	Age	Slalom	Giant slalom	Super-G	Downhill	Team combined	Team event
2025	22	DNF1	57	—	—	—	—

== Olympic results ==
Year
Year	Age	Slalom	Giant slalom	Super-G	Downhill	Team combined
2026	23	—	DNF1	—	—	—
