= Alex Astridge =

Emirati alpine skier (born 2006)

Personal information
- Full name: Alexander Astridge
- Born: 2 June 2006 (age 20) Cambridge, United Kingdom

Skiing career
- Country: United Arab Emirates
- Sport: Alpine skiing
- Club: Ski Dubai
- Disciplines: Slalom, giant slalom

Olympics
- Teams: 1 – (2026)
- Medals: 0

Alexander Astridge (Arabic: ألكسندر أستريدج; born 2 June 2006) is a British-born alpine skier for the United Arab Emirates.

Astridge studies at Heriot-Watt University in Dubai.

== Early life ==
Astridge was born in Cambridge, England but moved to the United Arab Emirates with his family at the age of six months. He learned to ski at Ski Dubai at the age of 3.

Astridge developed as a skier primarily through training on Ski Dubai’s indoor slope at the Mall of the Emirates, an atypical pathway for an alpine skier from a country without natural mountain terrain.

== Career ==
Astridge made his international racing debut on 6 November 2023 in a FIS Entry League race at Ski Dubai. Two months later, he became the first ski racer from the United Arab Emirates to compete in the Winter Youth Olympic Games. He finished 38th in the slalom at the competitions in Gangwon, but did not compete in the giant slalom despite being registered.

Astridge represented the United Arab Emirates at the 2025 Asian Winter Games, finishing 17th in the slalom event.

In 2026, Astridge qualified to compete at the 2026 Winter Olympics in the slalom, becoming the first man from the United Arab Emirates to compete at the Winter Olympics. At the games, in a race noted for its high rate of attrition, Astridge was among the 49 competitors (of 95 starters) who were not able to successfully complete their first run.

== Olympic results ==
Year
Year	Age	Slalom	Giant slalom	Super-G	Downhill	Team combined
2026	19	DNF1	—	—	—	—
