= Axel Brown =

Trinidadian-British bobsledder

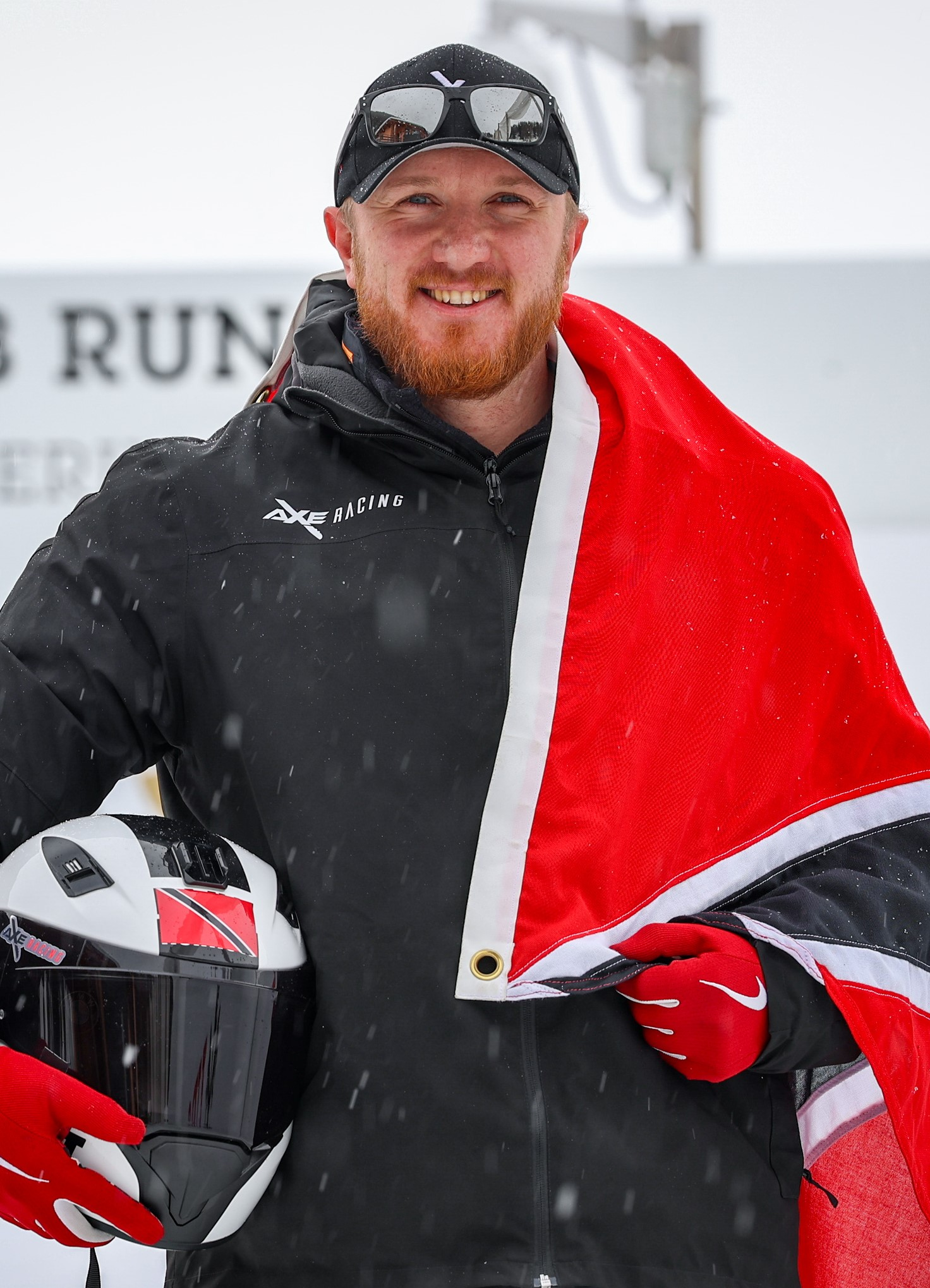
- Brown in 2024

Personal information
- Nationality: Trinidad and Tobago, Great Britain
- Born: 2 April 1992 (age 34) Harrogate, UK
- Height: 1.95 m (6 ft 5 in)
- Weight: 108 kg (238 lb)

Sport
- Country: Trinidad and Tobago
- Sport: Bobsleigh
- Position: Pilot
- Event(s): Olympic Games, World Championships

Axel Brown (born 2 April 1992 in Harrogate) is a British-born Trinidadian bobsledder, who represented Trinidad and Tobago at the 2022 Winter Olympics, in 2-man bobsleigh. He is the son of British explorer Chris Brown.

== Beijing 2022 Winter Olympics ==
Axel, along with teammate Andre Marcano, was the first team to represent Trinidad and Tobago in a Winter Olympic Games since 2002.

Axel Brown competed in the two-man bobsleigh event on 14 and 15 February 2022. The team of Axel and Andre Marcano placed 28th in the first heat and 27th in the second heat in the first day of competition. Injury causing Andre to withdraw created a new pairing of Axel Brown and reserve athlete Shakeel John. The team completed the third heat in 28th place, leading to a 28th overall finish, the highest finish for Trinidad & Tobago in any Winter Olympics.

=== Olympic games ===
| Event | Two-man |
Representing Trinidad and Tobago
| 2022 Beijing China | 28th |

== International Competition ==
As pilot of the 4-man team in the North American Cup in 2022 in Park City, Axel was the first Caribbean bobsleigh pilot to ever finish on the podium in a 4-man race. Axel and the team of Shakeel John, Xaverri Williams, and Adam Hames finished 3rd.

The 2-man team of Axel Brown and Andre Marcano earned the Caribbean’s highest ever World Cup 2-man position of 13th place in the IBSF World Cup in Park City Utah on 23 November 2022.

=== World Championships ===
| Event | Two-man |
Representing Trinidad and Tobago
| 2023 St. Moritz Switzerland | 20th |

== Sporting background ==
Brown was born in Great Britain to a British father and a Trinidadian mother. He competed for Great Britain in the sport of bobsleigh for seven years until 2021, when he decided to represent his mother's homeland of Trinidad and Tobago, with which he holds dual citizenship.

Axel represented Great Britain as a brakeman and featured in the World Cup, North American Cup, and Europe Cup, as well as being a reserve for the 2019 World Championships in Whistler, Canada. He became a pilot in 2019, placing fifth in the North American cup in his debut season.

He played American Football for Colorado State Rams from 2013 - 2014, before which he competed for the Great Britain Lions u18 team. He has also won Bronze and Silver medals in Taekwondo at the national level in the United Kingdom.

== Personal life ==
Axel was born and raised in Harrogate, United Kingdom. Where he attended Brackenfield primary school, followed by Harrogate Grammar School. Before pursuing the sport as a career, he worked at the Odeon cinema and volunteered at Horticap, a charity for adults with learning difficulties. Axel's brother Mika Brown, and Father, Christopher Brown, have both represented Great Britain in the sport of Triathlon at the World Championships.
