= Gregory Sun =

Trinidadian bobsledder

Personal information
- Nationality: Trinidad and Tobago
- Born: 10 August 1962 (age 62); Port of Spain, Trinidad and Tobago

Sport
- Sport: Bobsleigh

Gregory Sun (born 10 August 1962) is a Trinidad and Tobago bobsledder. He competed at the 1994, 1998 and the 2002 Winter Olympics. In his first and third Olympic appearances, Sun was the flag bearer for Trinidad and Tobago.
