= Cayman Islands at the World Athletics Championships =

- Flag of the Cayman Islands
- WA code: CAY
- Medals: Gold 0 Silver 0 Bronze 1 Total 1

World Athletics Championships appearances (overview)
- 1987; 1991; 1993; 1995; 1997; 1999; 2001; 2003; 2005; 2007; 2009; 2011; 2013; 2015; 2017; 2019; 2022; 2023; 2025

The Cayman Islands has competed in every World Athletics Championships editions since 1987, only missing the first one in 1983. Since then, it has only been on the podium one time, with a 3rd place by Cydonie Mothersille in the women's 200 meters in 2001. Finishing initially at 5th, she benefited from doping violations of Marion Jones and Kelli White, both from the United States.

== Medalists ==
Medal	Name	Year	Event
Bronze	Cydonie Mothersille	2001 Edmonton	Women's 200 meters

=== By event ===
Event	Gold	Silver	Bronze	Total
200 meters	0	0	1	1
Totals (1 entries)	0	0	1	1

=== By gender ===
Gender	Gold	Silver	Bronze	Total
Women	0	0	1	1
Men	0	0	0	0

== See also ==
- Cayman Islands at the Olympics
