= List of Caymanian records in athletics =

The following are the national records in athletics in the Cayman Islands maintained by Cayman Island's national athletics federation: Cayman Islands Athletic Association (CIAA).

== Outdoor ==
Key to tables: Awaiting ratification Record not kept by CIAA Not ratified or later rescinded by CIAA

=== Men ===
Event	Record	Athlete	Date	Meet	Place	Ref.
100 m	9.95 (+1.8 m/s)	Kemar Hyman	7 July 2012	Meeting de Atletismo Madrid	Madrid, Spain	
100 m	9.95 (−1.1 m/s)	Jaiden Reid	10 June 2026	NCAA Division I Championships	Eugene, United States	
200 m	19.63 (+1.5 m/s)	Jaiden Reid	12 June 2026	NCAA Division I Championships	Eugene, United States	
400 m	44.99	Jamal Walton	21 July 2017	Pan American U20 Championships	Trujillo, Peru	
800 m	1:50.22	Jon Rankin	8 April 2011	Rafer Johnson / Jackie Joyner-Kersee Invitational	Westwood, United States	
1500 m	3:46.09	Jon Rankin	15 July 2011	Central American and Caribbean Championships	Mayagüez, Puerto Rico	
3000 m	9:06.33	Dominic Dyer	27 March 2016	CARIFTA Games	St. George's, Grenada	
5000 m	14:08.09	Jon Rankin	11 March 2011	Oxy Distance Carnival	Los Angeles, United States	
10,000 m	33:29.01	Nicholas Akers	6 August 1978	Commonwealth Games	Edmonton, Canada	
Half marathon	1:22:41	Mark Hydes	5 May 2002		Brussels, Belgium	
Marathon	2:34:29	Jon Rankin	5 December 2010		Sacramento, United States	
110 m hurdles	13.36 (+0.4 m/s)	Ronald Forbes	30 April 2016	Spring Invitational	Clermont, United States	
400 m hurdles	51.23	Junior Hines	25 May 2012	NAIA Championship	Marion, United States	
3000 m steeplechase	12:12.29	Junio Hurlston	29 June 2003	Island Games	Saint Peter Port, Guernsey	
High jump	2.19 m	Omar Wright	13 May 2006		El Paso, United States	
Pole vault						
Long jump	8.31 m	Kareem Streete-Thompson	1 July 2000		Bad Langensalza, Germany	
Triple jump	16.09 m	Edward Manderson	16 July 1995	Central American and Caribbean Championships	Guatemala City, Guatemala	
Shot put	13.89 m	Jonathan Frederick	25 June 2016		George Town, Cayman Islands	
Discus throw	45.36 m	Michael Letterlough	30 April 2005		Orlando, United States	
Hammer throw	62.54 m	Michael Letterlough	5 June 2011	Kamloops Throws Meet	Kamloops, Canada	
Javelin throw	75.38 m	Alexander Pascal	7 June 2017	NCAA Division I Championships	Eugene, United States	
Decathlon						
Decathlon	100m (wind) / Long jump (wind) / Shot put / High jump / 400m / 110m H (wind) / Discus / Pole vault / Javelin / 1500m					
20 km walk (road)						
50 km walk (road)						
4 × 100 m relay	39.54	Cayman Islands; Kemar Hyman; Tyrell Cuffy; David Hamil; Carlos Morgan	4 July 2009	Central American and Caribbean Championships	Havana, Cuba	
4 × 200 m relay	1:24.91	Cayman Islands; Kemar Hyman; Tyrell Cuffy; David Hamil; Troy Long	24 May 2014	IAAF World Relays	Nassau, Bahamas	
4 × 400 m relay	3:13.77	Cayman Islands; Jeavhon Jackson; Karim Murray; Micheal Smikle; Sherlock Brooks	12 July 2019	Island Games	Gibraltar	

=== Women ===
Event	Record	Athlete	Date	Meet	Place	Ref.
100 m	11.08 (+1.0 m/s)	Cydonie Mothersille	5 July 2006		Salamanca, Spain	
200 m	22.39 (+1.1 m/s)	Cydonie Mothersille	10 July 2005	Central American and Caribbean Championships	Nassau, The Bahamas	
300 m	35.82	Cydonie Mothersille	14 September 2000		Sydney, Australia	
400 m	52.17 A	Shalysa Wray	15 May 2022	Big 12 Championships	Lubbock, United States	
800 m	2:10.4 h	Tiffany Cole	17 February 2018	First Chance 2	George Town, Cayman Islands	
800 m	2:07.59	Jaden Francis	5 April 2025	Florida Relays	Gainesville, United States	
1500 m	4:48.10	Tabitha Parchment	10 April 1982	CARIFTA Games	Kingston, Jamaica	
3000 m	9:35.52	Michelle Bush	16 August 1987	Pan American Games	Indianapolis, United States	
5000 m	19:03.4 h	Nicola Jordan	30 June 1999	Island Games	Visby, Sweden	
10,000 m	34:21.19	Michelle Bush	27 April 1989	Penn Relays	Philadelphia, United States	
10 km (road)	32:58	Michelle Bush	19 May 1991		Cleveland, United States	
15 km (road)	52:35	Michelle Bush	9 July 1989		Utica, United States	
20 km (road)	1:08:20	Michelle Bush	4 September 1989		New Haven, United States	
Half marathon	1:13:50	Michelle Bush	10 November 1991		Long Beach, United States	
Marathon	2:37:41	Michelle Bush	8 December 1991	California International Marathon	Sacramento, United States	
100 m hurdles	14.69 (−0.1 m/s)	Ameilia Gillispie	16 July 2013	Island Games	Devonshire Parish, Bermuda	
400 m hurdles	1:05.80	Kadeen Foster	21 February 2009		Kingston, Jamaica	
3000 m steeplechase						
High jump	1.75 m	Ashleigh Nalty	17 July 2013	Island Games	Devonshire Parish, Bermuda	
Pole vault						
Long jump	5.66 m (±0.0 m/s)	Anissa Owen	26 May 2019	BayTaf Classic	Tampa, United States	
Triple jump	11.11 m	Opal Bodden	19 March 2005		George Town, Cayman Islands	
Shot put	13.06 m	Lacee Barnes	16 April 2017	CARIFTA Games	Willemstad, Curaçao	
Discus throw	47.63 m	Lacee Barnes	15 April 2017	CARIFTA Games	Willemstad, Curaçao	
Hammer throw	39.88 m	Kristie Hurlston	15 April 2010	WCU Invitational	Cullowhee, United States	
Javelin throw	43.43 m	Daneliz Thomas	23 May 2019	NAIA Championships	Gulf Shores, United States	
Heptathlon	4212 pts	Ashleigh Nalty	24 May 2013		Marion, United States	
Heptathlon	100m H (wind) / High jump / Shot put / 200m (wind) / Long jump (wind) / Javelin / 800m; 15.49 (+0.3 m/s) / 1.67 m / 8.73 m / 27.24 (+2.3 m/s) / 5.04 m (+2.3 m/s) / 27.13 m / 2:48.00					
20 km walk (road)						
4 × 100 m relay	47.60	Cayman Islands; Crystal Robinson; Schwannah McCarthy; Calicia Burke; Cydonie Mothersille	1 July 1999	Island Games	Visby, Sweden	
4 × 400 m relay	3:54.60	Cayman Islands; Crystal Robinson; Schwannah McCarthy; Calicia Burke; Cydonie Mothersille	1 July 1999	Island Games	Visby, Sweden	

== Indoor ==
=== Men ===
Event	Record	Athlete	Date	Meet	Place	Ref.
60 m	6.49	Davonte Howell	10 January 2026	Clemson Invitational	Clemson, United States	
200 m	20.27	Jaden Reid	27 February 2025	SEC Championships	College Station, United States	
400 m	48.00	Carl Morgan	9 February 2007		Allston, United States	
800 m	1:52.21	Jorel Belafonte	27 February 2015		Blacksburg, United States	
800 m	1:51.82 OT	Jorel Belafonte	23 January 2016		Lexington, United States	
1500 m						
3000 m						
55 m hurdles	7.28	Ronald Forbes	26 January 2008		Gainesville, United States	
60 m hurdles	7.58	Ronald Forbes	14 March 2008	NCAA Division I Championships	Fayetteville, United States	
High jump	2.19 m	Louis Gordon	22 February 2020	America East Championships	Boston, United States	
Pole vault	2.65 m	Maxwell Hyman	24 January 2009		Lynchburg, United States	
Long jump	8.16 m (1st Jump)	Kareem Streete-Thompson	11 March 2001	World Championships	Lisbon, Portugal	
Long jump	8.16 m (2nd Jump)	Kareem Streete-Thompson	11 March 2001	World Championships	Lisbon, Portugal	
Triple jump	15.60 m	Carl Morgan	6 December 2008		Murfreesboro, United States	
Shot put	16.14 m	Michael Letterlough	26 February 2006		Murfreesboro, United States	
Heptathlon						
Heptathlon	60m / Long jump / Shot put / High jump / 60m H / Pole vault / 1000m					
5000 m walk						
4 × 400 m relay						

=== Women ===
Event	Record	Athlete	Date	Meet	Place	Ref.
60 m	7.36	Cydonie Mothersille	14 February 2003	Tyson Invitational	Fayetteville, United States	
200 m	22.82	Cydonie Mothersille	23 February 2003	Meeting Pas de Calais	Liévin, France	
400 m	53.20 A	Shalysa Wray	25 February 2023	Big 12 Championships	Lubbock, United States	
800 m	3:03.29 (Note: record set during pentathlon competition)	Ashleigh Nalty	7 February 2014	Keck Invitational	Bloomington, United States	
800 m	2:11.05	Jaden Francis	10 February 2024	Tiger Paw Invitational	Clemson, United States	
800 m	2:07.60	Jaden Francis	2 March 2025	ACC Championships	Louisville, United States	
1500 m	4:18.80 (Note: outdoor mark ratified as absolute record)	Michelle Bush	2 March 1987		New York City, United States	
3000 m	9:28.99 (Note: outdoor mark ratified as absolute record)	Michelle Bush	22 February 1987		West Point, United States	
60 m hurdles	9.58	Ashleigh Nalty	20 February 2014	AMC Championships	Elsah, United States	
High jump	1.70 m	Ashleigh Nalty	2 March 2013	NAIA Championships	Geneva, United States	
High jump	1.70 m	Ashleigh Nalty	7 February 2015		Akron, United States	
Pole vault						
Long jump	4.73 m (Note: per World Athletics source)	Ashleigh Nalty	7 February 2014	Keck Invitational	Bloomington, United States	
Long jump	4.73 m	Ashleigh Nalty	20 February 2014		Elsah, United States	
Long jump	5.56 m	Anissa Owen	26 February 2011	AUS Track and Field Championship University Moncton	Montreal, Canada	
Long jump	5.38 m	Anissa Owen	28 January 2012	17th Annual McGill Team Challenge	Montreal, Canada	
Triple jump						
Shot put	7.87 m (Note: record set during pentathlon competition)	Ashleigh Nalty	7 February 2014	Keck Invitational	Bloomington, United States	
Pentathlon	2667 pts	Ashleigh Nalty	7 February 2014	Keck Invitational	Bloomington, United States	
Pentathlon	60m H / High jump / Shot put / Long jump / 800m; 9.97 / 1.60 m / 7.87 m / 4.73 m / 3:03.29					
3000 m walk						
4 × 400 m relay						
