= List of flag bearers for the Cayman Islands at the Olympics =

Cayman Islands at the Olympics
- Flag of the Cayman Islands
- IOC code: CAY
- NOC: Cayman Islands Olympic Committee
- Website: www.caymanolympic.org.ky
- Medals: Gold 0 Silver 0 Bronze 0 Total 0

Summer appearances
- 1976; 1980; 1984; 1988; 1992; 1996; 2000; 2004; 2008; 2012; 2016; 2020; 2024

Winter appearances
- 2010; 2014; 2018–2026

This is a list of flag bearers who have represented Cayman Islands at the Olympics.

Flag bearers carry the national flag of their country at the opening ceremony of the Olympic Games.

#	Event year	Season	Flag bearer	Sport	Ref.
1	1984	Summer	Carson Ebanks	Sailing	
2	1988	Summer	Alfred Ebanks	Cycling	
3	1996	Summer	Carson Ebanks	Sailing	
4	2000	Summer	Kareem Streete-Thompson	Athletics	
5	2004	Summer	Cydonie Mothersille	Athletics	
6	2008	Summer	Ronald Forbes	Athletics	
7	2010	Winter	Dow Travers	Alpine skiing	
8	2012	Summer	Kemar Hyman	Athletics	
9	2014	Winter	Dow Travers	Alpine skiing	
10	2016	Summer	Ronald Forbes	Athletics	
11	2020	Summer	Jillian Crooks	Swimming	
11	2020	Summer	Brett Fraser	Swimming	
12	2024	Summer	Jordan Crooks	Swimming	
12	2024	Summer	Charlotte Webster	Sailing	

== See also ==
- Cayman Islands at the Olympics
