= National Black Marathoners Association =

American running club

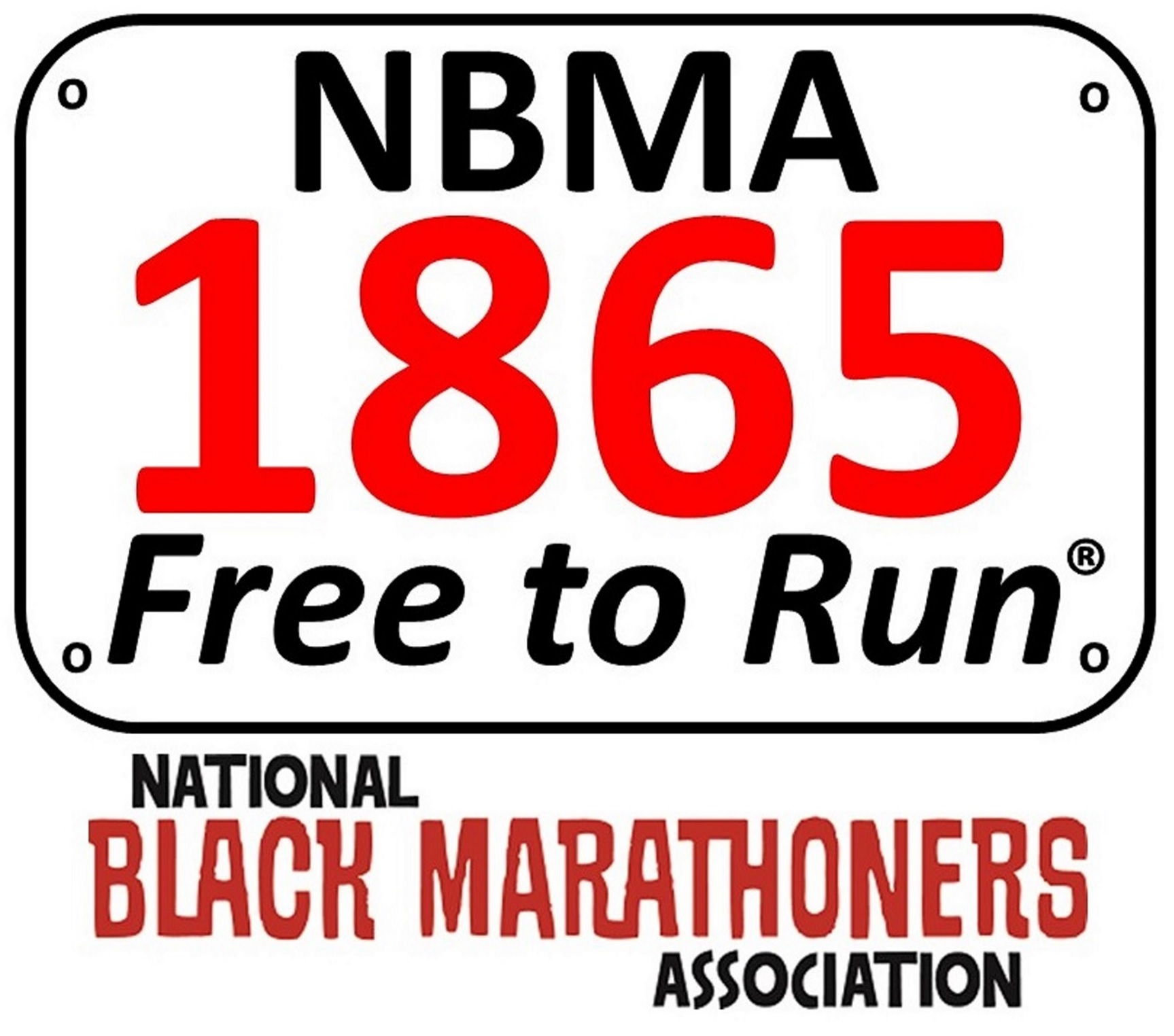
National Black Marathoners Association's 1865 Logo

The National Black Marathoners' Association (NBMA) is a not-for-profit runners' organization, open to everyone, regardless of running or walking ability. Founded in 2004, the organization offers college scholarships to high school distance runners.

The executive director and co-founder is Anthony "Tony" Reed, who in 2007 became the first Black person to run marathons on all seven continents.

NBMA's logo is in the form of a race bib bearing the number 1865, alluding to the Thirteenth Amendment to the United States Constitution, which abolished "slavery and involuntary servitude" on December 6, 1865, after which Blacks were supposed to be "free to run" without interference.

Since 2013, NBMA has recognized the accomplishments of African American distance runners at its National Black Distance Running Hall of Fame and Achievement Awards Events.

In 2021, the organization released Breaking Three Hours: Trailblazing African American Women Marathoners, a documentary focused on African American women runners. In 2023, a second documentary, We ARE Distance Runners: Untold Stories of African American Athletes, profiled seven African American distance runners to dispel the myth that African Americans are sprinters.

== Annual summits ==
NBMA held its first Annual Summit at the 2005 Lewis and Clark Marathon in St. Charles, Missouri. It has occasionally held its summits in partnership with races such as the 2018 Baltimore Running Festival, the 2019 Little Rock Marathon, the 2020 St. Jude Marathon, and 2021 Flying Pig Marathon.

== National Black Distance Running Hall of Fame ==
The Hall of Fame has inducted classes of honorees in 2013-2015, 2017, 2019, 2022 and 2024.

- Class of 2013: Marilyn Bevans, Ted Corbitt, Frederick F. Davis III, Warren Elzy, Frances Gilbert, Angela Ivory, South Fulton Running Partners
- Class of 2014: New York Pioneer Club
- Class of 2015: Elizabeth Brown, Rosco Lee Brown, Charles Burden, Robin Campbell-Bennett, Bridgette Collins, Tobie Joseph Cotton, Ricky Cox, James Dean, Lisa Felder, Ed Gardiner, Phillip Granville, Howard Hale, Frank Hart, Alphonzo Jackson, Augustus “Gus” Johnson, R. Earl Johnson, Mebrahtom Keflezighi, Merhawi Keflezighi, Clifford Mitchell, Gus Moore, Aaron Morris, William Pegram, Jon Byron Rankin, Sam Robinson, S. Smith, G. Stevens, John Stookey (Stuckey), Ed Williams, F. Williams, Avondale Running Club
- Class of 2017: Loretta Claiborne, Isaiah Douglas, Richard Gregory, Ron Gregory, Anthony Renard Reed, Ella Willis-Glaze, Team Marathon
- Class of 2019: Herman Atkins, Gary Corbitt, Lillian Greene-Chamberlain, Alisa Camille Harvey, Oscar Moore, Jr., Catherine Pugh, Charlotte Simmons
- Class of 2022: Samia Akbar, Gillis Bowden, Michele Bush-Cuke, Sika Henry, Reggie McAfee, MIchele Tiff-Hill, Ingrid Walters, Shawanna White, Rainbow Runners Club
- Class of 2024: Shalisa Davis, Anthanette Fields-Wilson, Joseph Gray

== Documentaries ==
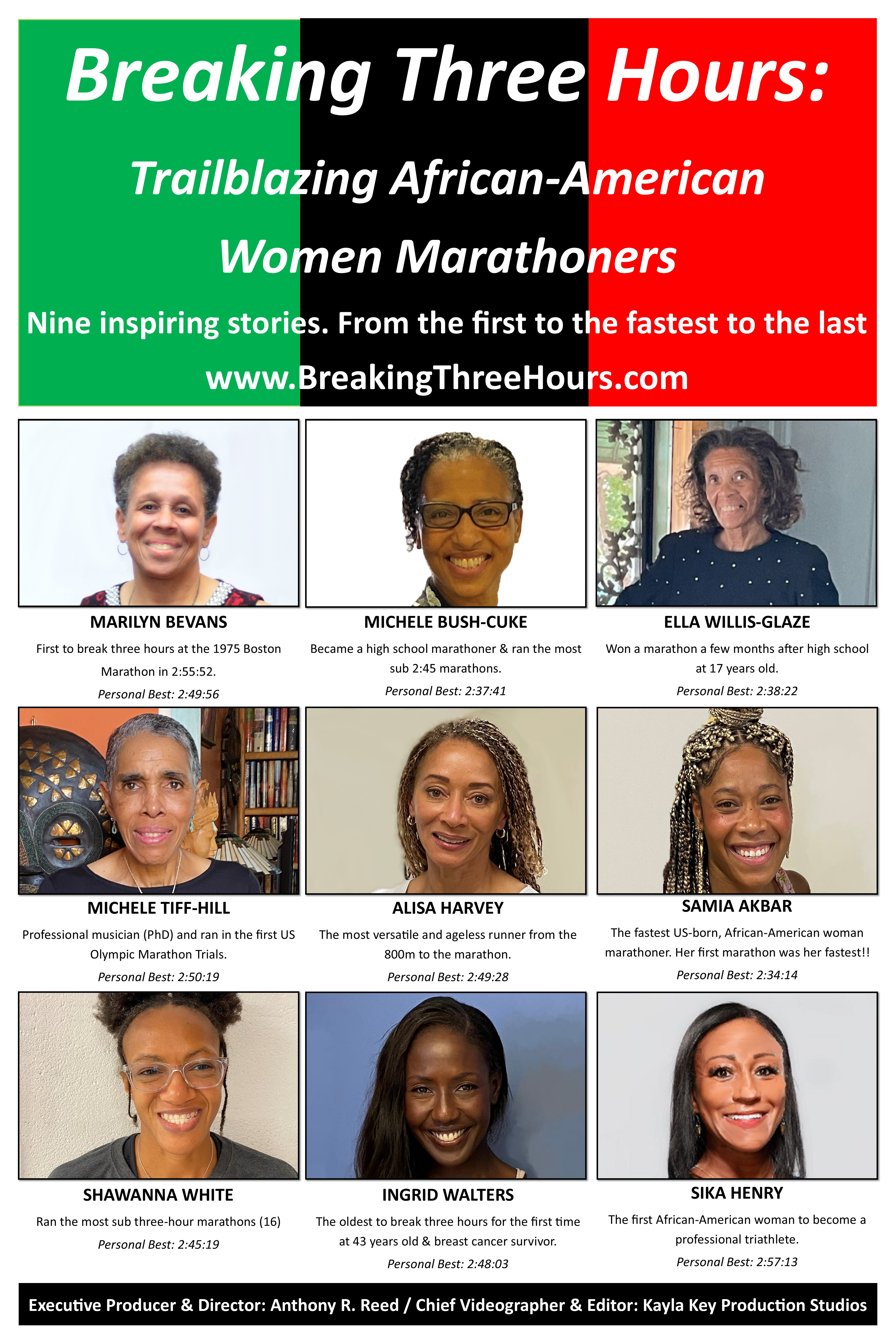
Breaking Three Hours: Trailblazing African American Women Marathoners Poster

The organization has released two documentaries:

=== Breaking Three Hours: Trailblazing African American Women Marathoners ===
A 2022 feature-length documentary film directed and written by Anthony Reed looks at nine US-born, African American women who ran marathons in under three hours.

The film features Marilyn Bevans, who became the first African American woman to run a sub-three-hour marathon at the Boston Marathon, as well as Samia Akbar, Michele Bush-Cuke, Sika Henry, Michele Tiff-Hill, Ingrid Walters, Shawanna White, Alisa Harvey and Ella Willis-Glaze.

The chief videographer and editor was Kayla Key, who also provided the voiceover for each of interviewee introductions. Bridgette L. Collins was the voice of Harriet Tubman and Nita Peters McKeethen was the trailer voiceover.

==== Production ====
Filming of the interviews and introductions took place between August 15 and 29, 2021, in Tucson, Arizona; Boston, Massachusetts; Detroit, Michigan; Baltimore, Maryland; and Alexandria, Virginia. The closing scenes, which featured Bevans, were recorded by Reed at the 2022 Boston Marathon.

==== Reception ====
In The Washington Post, Kelyn Soong wrote in April 2023 that the documentary has brought "renewed attention" to the "exclusive list of Black American female marathoners to break the three-hour barrier" and "the fact that relatively few Black American women have broken the three-hour marathon barrier."

==== Honors and awards ====
The documentary and two ten-minute shorts received various awards at 2022 film festivals, including

- Seattle Film Festival: Best Sports Documentary Feature Film and Best Original Song for a Feature Film.
- The NewsFest True Stories International Film and Writers’ Festival: Best Music, Best News Story/Public Information, and Best Short Documentary Under 13 Minutes.
- WRPN Women's International Film Festival: Exceptional Merit Award
- New York Independent Cinema Awards: Award Nominee

The film was also shown at the Toronto International Women's Film Festival, Whistleblower Summit & Film Festival, San Antonio Black International Film Festival, Visions of the Black Experience, Black Entertainment and Sports Lawyers Association Film Festival, Sweden's Boden International Film Festival, and the Minute Madness Toronto Film Festival.

=== We ARE Distance Runners: Untold Stories of African American Athletes ===
This 2024 feature-length documentary film, directed and written by Reed, aimed to dispel the myth that African Americans are sprinters and not distance runners by profiling seven African American distance runners.

The film features nationally ranked milers and two-milers Ronald and Richard “Dick” Gregory from Saint Louis. Richard Gregory ran 3,500 miles from Los Angeles to New York City. Ronald Gregory held the national high school record for the one- and two-mile races.

Theordore “Ted” Corbitt was the first African American to compete in the Olympic marathon (26.2 miles/42.2K) and conceived of routing the New York City Marathon course through the city's five boroughs.

The film also includes Reed and Shalisa “Lisa” Davis, who have completed the marathon hat trick: running at least one hundred marathons, a marathon in every US state, and a marathon on the seven continents. Reed is the first Black in the world to run marathons on all seven continents in 2007. Ten years later, Shalisa Davis set the world record for running marathons on all the continents in seven days, thirty minutes, twenty-seven seconds. Finally, it includes two Oakland, California, runners: Lisa Felder, who completed over 345 marathons and over 110 ultramarathons; and Alphonzo Jackson, who was ranked in the top three in world in his age group for the 5K and half marathon.

The videographers were Luis Escobar, Key, Reed, and Brian Young. Nita Peters McKeethen provided the voiceover for the film and trailer.

==== Production ====
The Richard Gregory interview was recorded in Dallas, Texas, on December 10, 2017. Filming for the other interviews and introductions took place between March 19 and July 31, 2023, in Oakland, California; Chicago, Illinois; Cincinnati, Ohio; Port Gibson, Mississippi; Saint Louis; Austin, Texas; Cedar Hill, Texas; Dallas, Texas; Suffolk, Virginia; and Williamsburg, Virginia.

==== Honors and awards ====
The feature-length documentary and related documentary shorts received various awards at film festivals, including:

- Global Film Festival Awards, Los Angeles, California: 2023 Best Feature Documentary
- Oniros Film Awards, New York, New York: 2023 Best Biographical Film
- The Independent Creators Expo (ICE) CineFest, Cincinnati, Ohio: 2024 Best Feature Documentary and Best Biographical Feature Film
- Oniros Film Awards, New York, NY: 2023 Finalist Best Sports Film
- New York International Film Awards, 2023 Honorable Mention - Best Inspirational Film
- Oniros Film Awards, New York, NY, 2023 Honorable Mention - Best Inspirational Film
- Black History Film Festival, DC & Atlanta: 2024 Honorable Mention - Best Feature Documentary
- The People's Film Festival, Harlem, NY: 2024 Honorable Mention - Best Feature Documentary
- ATX Short Film Showcase - Austin's Monthly Film Festival, Austin, TX: 2024 Honorable Mention - Best Short Film - TX Showcase
- Luleå International Film Festival, Sweden: 2023 Semi-Finalist - Best Short Documentary
- WRPN Women's International Film Festival, Rehoboth Beach, DE: 2024 Exceptional Merit - Best Feature Documentary and Best Sports Documentary
- The Black Panther International Short Film Festival, India: 2023 Award Nominee - Best Women's Short Documentary
- NewsFest — True Stories International Film and Writers Festival, Pasadena, CA: 2023 Award Nominees - Best Documentary News Story Over 30 Minutes, Best Family History Story, Best True Story (Documentary Style), and Most Inspiring
- Seattle Film Festival, Seattle, WA: 2024 Award Nominee - Best Short Sports Doc
- Orlando Urban Film Festival, Orlando, FL: 2024 Award Nominees - Best Feature Documentary, Best Social Impact Film, Veteran & Military Award For Best Film/Documentary, and Best Documentarian

It was also shown at the:

- Crown Point International Film Festival, Chicago, IL
- Greater Cleveland Urban Film Festival, Cleveland, OH
- Stockholm City Film Festival – Monthly, Sweden
- St. Louis International Film Festival, St. Louis, MO
- Austin Lift-Off Film Festival, Austin, TX
- Seattle Film Festival, Seattle, WA
- Freedom Festival International, Columbia, SC
