= Cayman Islands at the 2025 World Athletics Championships =

- Flag of Cayman Islands
- WA code: CAY

in Tokyo, Japan 13 September 2025 – 21 September 2025
- Competitors: 1 (1 man and 0 women)
- Medals: Gold 0 Silver 0 Bronze 0 Total 0

World Athletics Championships appearances (overview)
- 1987; 1991; 1993; 1995; 1997; 1999; 2001; 2003; 2005; 2007; 2009; 2011; 2013; 2015; 2017; 2019; 2022; 2023; 2025

Cayman Islands competed at the 2025 World Athletics Championships in Tokyo, Japan, which were held from 13 to 21 September 2025. The athlete delegation of the territory consisted of sprinter Davonte Howell. He competed in the men's 100 metres and failed to make it past the qualifying heats.

== Background ==
The 2025 World Athletics Championships in Tokyo, Japan, were held from 19 to 27 August 2023. The Championships were held at the Japan National Stadium. To qualify for the World Championships, athletes had to reach an entry standard (e.g. time or distance), place in a specific position at select competitions, be a wild card entry, or qualify through their World Athletics Ranking at the end of the qualification period.

One athlete qualified to represent Cayman Islands at the World Championships. Sprinter Davonte Howell reached the qualification standard for the men's 100 metres after he ran under 10 seconds at the 2025 Junior Pan American Games, recording a time of 9.98 seconds in the final of the event. This was Howell's first appearance at the World Championships though he had competed for the team previously at the 2022 World Athletics U20 Championships.

== Results ==
Key

- Q = Qualified for the next round
- q = Qualified for the next round as a fastest loser or, in field events, by position without achieving the qualifying target
- NR = National record
- PB = Personal best
- SB = Season best
- N/A = Round not applicable for the event

=== Men ===
Howell competed in the qualifying heats of the men's 100 metres on 13 September in the sixth heat against seven other competitors. There, he recorded a time of 10.33 seconds and placed fifth, failing to advance further as athletes in the top three of their heats and the next three athletes would only be able to do so. After his race, Howell commented that he had a great experience. He also stated that his hamstring became sore during his warm-up, thus not reaching his desired results.

Track and road events

Athlete	Event	Heat		Semifinal		Final	
Athlete	Event	Result	Rank	Result	Rank	Result	Rank
Davonte Howell	100 metres	10.33	5	Did not advance			
