= Cayman Islands at the 2023 World Athletics Championships =

- Flag of Cayman Islands
- WA code: CAY

in Budapest, Hungary 19 August 2023 – 27 August 2023
- Competitors: 1 (1 man and 0 women)
- Medals: Gold 0 Silver 0 Bronze 0 Total 0

World Athletics Championships appearances (overview)
- 1987; 1991; 1993; 1995; 1997; 1999; 2001; 2003; 2005; 2007; 2009; 2011; 2013; 2015; 2017; 2019; 2022; 2023; 2025

The Cayman Islands competed at the 2023 World Athletics Championships in Budapest, Hungary, which were held from 19 to 27 August 2023. The athlete delegation of the country was composed of one competitor, hurdler Rasheem Brown who would compete in the men's 110 metres hurdles. He qualified for the Championships upon being selected by the Cayman Islands Athletic Association. In the heats, Brown placed last in his group and failed to qualify for the semifinals.

== Background ==
The 2023 World Athletics Championships in Budapest, Hungary, were held from 19 to 27 August 2023. The Championships were held at the National Athletics Centre. To qualify for the World Championships, athletes had to reach an entry standard (e.g. time or distance), place in a specific position at select competitions, be a wild card entry, or qualify through their World Athletics Ranking at the end of the qualification period.

As the Cayman Islands did not meet any of the four standards, they could send either one male or one female athlete in one event of the Championships who has not yet qualified. The Cayman Islands Athletic Association selected hurdler Rasheem Brown who held a personal best of 13.50 seconds and was ranked 88th in the world at the time of his selection for the Championships. Previously, Brown had competed for the Cayman Islands at the 2022 World Athletics Championships in the same event.

== Results ==
Key

- Q = Qualified for the next round
- q = Qualified for the next round as a fastest loser or, in field events, by position without achieving the qualifying target
- NR = National record
- PB = Personal best
- SB = Season best
- N/A = Round not applicable for the event

=== Men ===
Brown competed in the heats of his event on 20 August in the third heat. There, he competed against six other athletes and recorded a time of 14.02 seconds. He placed last in the event and failed to qualify further into the semifinals.

Track and road events

Athlete	Event	Heat		Semifinal		Final	
Athlete	Event	Result	Rank	Result	Rank	Result	Rank
Rasheem Brown	110 metres hurdles	14.02	7	Did not advance			
