= Cayman Islands at the 2011 World Championships in Athletics =

- WA code: CAY
- National federation: Cayman Islands Athletic Association

in Daegu
- Competitors: 1
- Medals: Gold 0 Silver 0 Bronze 0 Total 0

World Championships in Athletics appearances
- 1987; 1991; 1993; 1995; 1997; 1999; 2001; 2003; 2005; 2007; 2009; 2011; 2013; 2015; 2017; 2019; 2022; 2023; 2025

The Cayman Islands competed at the 2011 World Championships in Athletics from August 27 to September 4 in Daegu, South Korea. One athlete, 110m hurdler Ronald Forbes, represented the country in the event.

== Results ==
=== Men ===
Athlete	Event	Preliminaries		Heats		Semifinals		Final	
Athlete	Event	Time Width Height	Rank	Time Width Height	Rank	Time Width Height	Rank	Time Width Height	Rank
Ronald Forbes	110 m hurdles			13.54	14	13.67	11	Did not advance	
