= Cayman Islands at the 2022 World Athletics Championships =

- Flag of the Cayman Islands
- WA code: CAY

in Eugene, United States 15 July 2022 – 24 July 2022
- Competitors: 1 (1 man)
- Medals: Gold 0 Silver 0 Bronze 0 Total 0

World Athletics Championships appearances (overview)
- 1987; 1991; 1993; 1995; 1997; 1999; 2001; 2003; 2005; 2007; 2009; 2011; 2013; 2015; 2017; 2019; 2022; 2023; 2025

The Cayman Islands competed at the 2022 World Athletics Championships in Eugene, Oregon, United States, which were held from 15 to 24 July 2022. The athlete delegation of the country was composed of one competitor, hurdler Rasheem Brown. At the World Championships, Brown competed in the men's 110 metres hurdles and placed sixth in his heat, failing to advance to the semifinals.

== Background ==
The 2022 World Athletics Championships in Eugene, Oregon, United States, were held from 15 to 24 July 2022. To qualify for the World Championships, athletes had to reach an entry standard (e.g. time and distance), place in a specific position at select competitions, be a wild card entry, or qualify through their World Athletics Ranking at the end of the qualification period.

As the Cayman Islands did not meet any of the four standards, they could send either one male or one female athlete in one event of the Championships who has not yet qualified. The Cayman Islands Athletic Association selected hurdler Rasheem Brown who held a personal and season's best in the men's 110 metres hurdles, his entered event, with a time of 13.53 seconds. At his selection for the World Athletics Championships, he was ranked 100th in the World Athletics Rankings.

== Results ==
Key

- Q = Qualified for the next round
- q = Qualified for the next round as a fastest loser or, in field events, by position without achieving the qualifying target
- NR = National record
- PB = Personal best
- SB = Season best
- N/A = Round not applicable for the event

=== Men ===
Brown competed in the qualifying heats of the men's 110 metres hurdles on 16 July 2022 in the third heat against seven other competitors. There, he recorded a time of 13.78 seconds and placed sixth, failing to advance to the semifinals as only the top four athletes of each heat and the next four fastest athletes would only be able to do so.

Track and road events

Athlete	Event	Heat		Semi-final		Final	
Athlete	Event	Result	Rank	Result	Rank	Result	Rank
Rasheem Brown	110 m hurdles	13.78 (−0.3)	6	did not advance			
