= Musyoki =

Musyoki is a surname of Kenyan origin. Notable people with the surname include:

- Michael Musyoki (born 1956), Kenyan long-distance runner and 1984 Olympic medallist
- Patrick Makau Musyoki (born 1985), Kenyan long-distance runner and marathon world record holder
