= Alisa Harvey =

American middle-distance runner

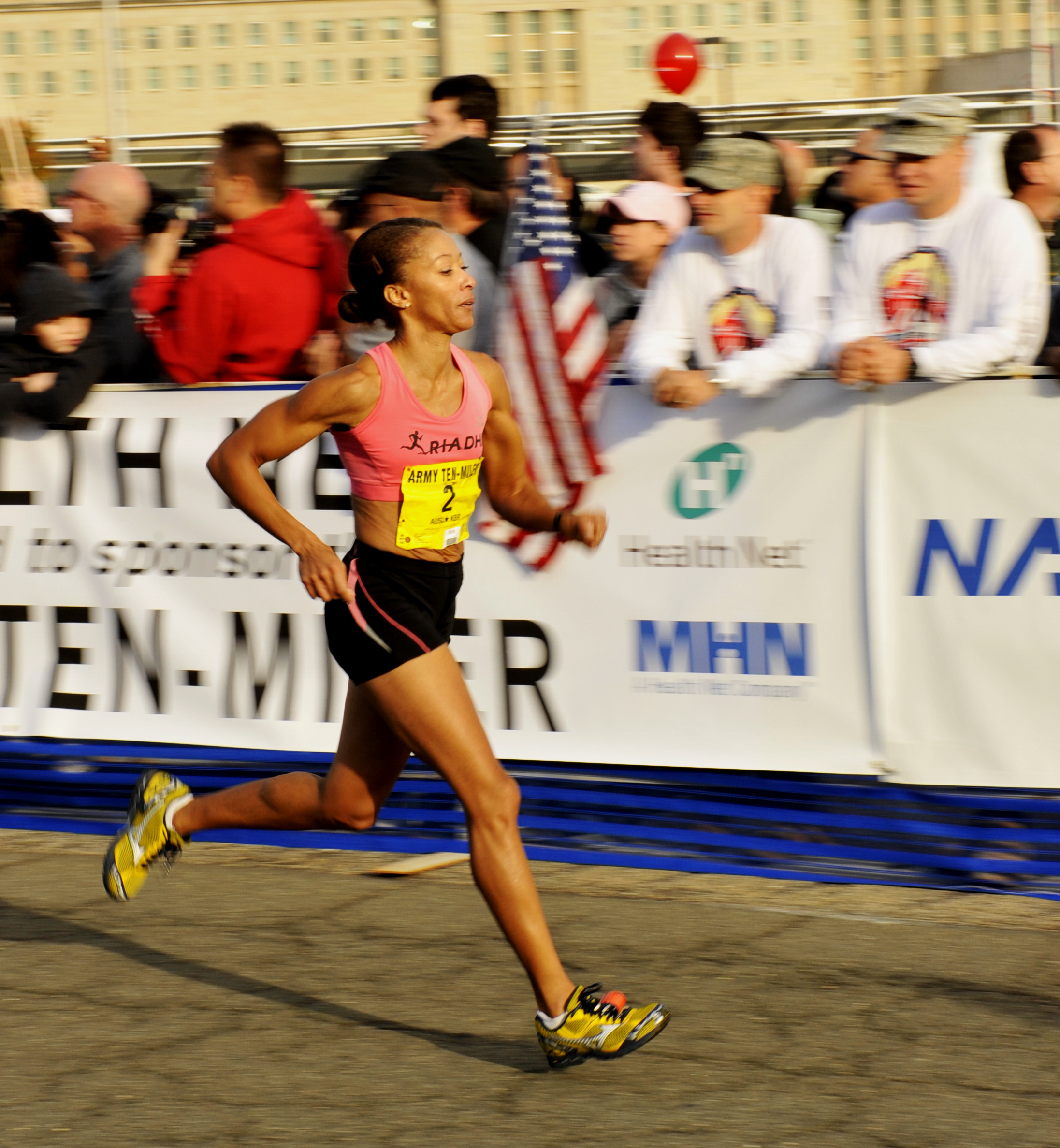
- Harvey running the Army 10-Miler in 2010

Personal information
- Born: September 16, 1965 (age 60) Arlington, Virginia, United States

Sport
- Sport: Track, long-distance running
- Events: 800 meters, 1500 meters
- College team: Tennessee

Achievements and titles
- Personal bests: 800m: 1:59.72; 1500m: 4:08.33; Mile: 4:29.65; 5000m: 16:25.04
Medal record
Women's Athletics
Representing the United States
Pan American Games
Gold medal – first place	1991 Havana	1500 metres
Silver medal – second place	1991 Havana	800 metres
World Cup
Bronze medal – third place	1992 Havana	1500 metres

Alisa Harvey (temporarily Alisa Harvey-Hill; September 16, 1965) is a middle-distance runner from the United States. She set her personal best in the women's 1,500 meters 4:08.32 on June 26, 1992, at the US Olympic Trials in New Orleans and in the 800 meters 1:59.72 in 1995. She was ranked in the U.S. top ten in the 1500 meters 8 years in a row from 1986 to 1993, achieving number 1 in 1993. After taking 1994 off for maternity, she returned to the list in 1998 and 1999. She also made the U.S. list in the 800 metres six times between 1988 and 1996. In 1998 she became the 24th American woman to break 4:30 for a mile. She is still an active masters competitor, holding several world records and pursuing more as she moves into a new age division.

== Running career ==
=== High school ===
As a student athlete at Thomas Jefferson High School in Alexandria, Virginia, she set the still standing Virginia High School record for 1600 meters at 4:50. Her high school time for the 1500 metres still ranks as the #5 time, nationwide and has only been beaten once since she set it in 1983.

=== Collegiate ===
Next she ran for the University of Tennessee, on their NCAA Women's Indoor Track and Field Championship 4x800 meter relay team. She was part of another Tennessee 4x800 team that set the NCAA record. Individually she won the 1986 NCAA Women's Outdoor Track and Field Championship at 1500 meters.

=== Post-collegiate ===
She won the 1991 and 1999 editions of the Fifth Avenue Mile in New York City. Later on, she continued to run into the Masters division and currently holds the world indoor record for the mile in both the W35 and W40 division. She also holds the W40 American outdoor records in the 800 metres and 1 mile.

She helped as an assistant coach at George Mason University, George Mason High School and at Battlefield High School. She was inducted into the National Black Distance Running Hall of Fame in 2019 by the National Black Marathoners Association (NBMA). She was also featured in the NBMA's feature-length documentary Breaking Three Hours: Trailblazing African American Marathoners.

== Achievements ==
Year	Tournament	Venue	Result	Extra
Representing the United States
1985	USA Outdoor Track and Field Championships	Indianapolis, Indiana	8th	1500 m
1986	USA Outdoor Track and Field Championships	Eugene, Oregon	4th	1500 m
1987	USA Outdoor Track and Field Championships	San Jose, California	8th	1500 m
1988	USA Outdoor Track and Field Championships	Tampa, Florida	3rd	1500 m
1989	USA Outdoor Track and Field Championships	Houston, Texas	6th	1500 m
1989	IAAF World Indoor Championships	Budapest, Hungary	5th/heat	800 m
1990	USA Outdoor Track and Field Championships	Norwalk, California	3rd	1500 m
1991	IAAF World Indoor Championships	Seville, Spain	7th	1500 m
1991	USA Outdoor Track and Field Championships	New York City	4th	1500 m
1991	Pan American Games	Havana, Cuba	2nd	800 m
1991	Pan American Games	Havana, Cuba	1st	1500 m
1992	United States Olympic Trials (track and field)	New Orleans	6th	1500 m
1992	IAAF World Cup	Havana, Cuba	3rd	1500 m
1993	IAAF World Indoor Championships	Toronto, Canada	9th	1500 m
1993	IAAF World Championships	Stuttgart, Germany	8th/heat	1500 m
1999	IAAF World Indoor Championships	Maebashi, Japan	6th/heat	1500 m
