= Ronald Forbes =

Ronald Forbes may refer to:

- Ronald Forbes (artist) (born 1947), Scottish artist
- Ronald Forbes (hurdler) (born 1985), Caymanian hurdler
