= Jaiden Reid =

Cayman sprinter (born 2005)

Personal information
- Born: 10 April 2005 (age 21)

Sport
- Sport: Athletics
- Event: Sprint

Achievements and titles
- Personal bests: 60m: 6.56 (2025) NR; 100m: 9.95 (2026) NR; 200m: 19.63 (2026) NR
Medal record
Men's Athletics
Representing Cayman Islands
CARIFTA Games Junior (U20)}
Silver medal – second place	2024 St. George's	100m

Jaiden Reid (born 10 April 2005) is a Cayman sprinter. He is the national record holder for the 60 metres, 100 metres and 200 metres and won the 200 metres at the 2026 NCAA Championships.

== Biography ==
Running for his school, Jamaica College, he was a member of the team which won the High School Boys 4×100 metres relay race during the 2023 Penn Relays in Philadelphia.

He was a silver medalist behind compatriot Davonte Howell in the 100 metres at the 2024 CARIFTA Games, running 10.34 seconds in April 2024. The following month, while competing for Louisiana State University, he set a new national record of 20.51 seconds for the 200 metres at the 2024 SEC Conference finals, breaking the previous record of 20.57 which was set by Jamal Walton in April 2017.

He set a personal best in the 60 metres at the Tyson Invitational in Fayetteville, Arkansas in February 2025, finishing in 6.59 seconds. At the same event, he ran the indoor 200 metres in a personal best 20.72 seconds. Two weeks later, he lowered his 60m personal best to 6.58 seconds at the SEC Indoor Championships and finished third in the 200 metres with a personal best time of 20.27 seconds, reported as the fourth-fastest 200m short track time a Caribbean man had ever achieved. He lowered his personal best to 6.56 seconds for the 60 metres at the 2025 NCAA Indoor Championships in March 2025. Competing at the SEC Outdoor Championships in May 2025, he set a personal best time for the 100 metres of 10.08 seconds. He also ran 20.15 seconds to finish third in the 200 metres behind Makanakaishe Charamba and race winner Jordan Anthony, having run a personal best 20.13 seconds in the semi-finals. In June 2025, he ran a personal best 10.02 seconds to qualify for the final of the 2025 NCAA Outdoor Championships in Eugene, Oregon.

In June 2026, Reid competed in the preliminary round of the 2026 NCAA Championships and ran a personal best 9.95 seconds in his 100 m heat to reach the final, and was the fastest qualifier from the 200 m heats with 20.05 seconds. On 12 June, Reid won the 200 metres final in 19.63 seconds, an NCAA record time, surpassing the previous best set by Walter Dix in 2007. Reid also had a second-place finish in the 100 meters behind Kanyinsola Ajayi, which he ran in a wind-assisted 9.82 seconds.
