= Catoctin Mountain Park Run =

American 10K run organized by Jimmy Carter

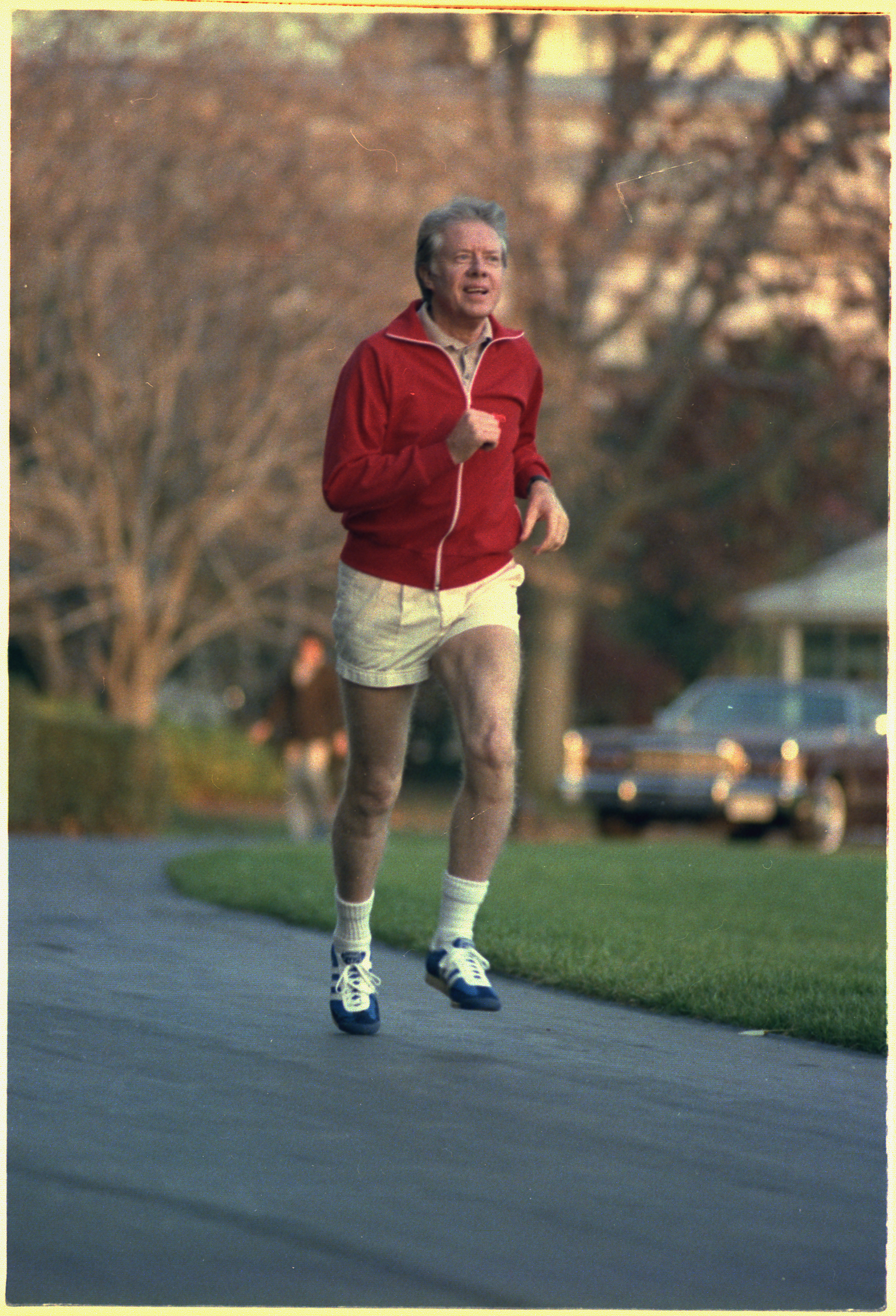
- Carter jogging in 1978
- Location: Catoctin Mountain Park, Maryland, U.S.
- Date: September 15, 1979
- Competitors: 898 registered 750 starters 703 finishers

Champions
- Men: Herb Lindsay (30:00.1)
- Women: Marilyn Bevans (40:25.8)

The Catoctin Mountain Park Run was a 10K run (6.2 miles) organized by the Jimmy Carter administration in September 1979. The event was set up by the White House to give Carter a chance to run a competitive road race without the security risk of a third-party organizer. The Catoctin Mountain Park course was hilly, and due to over-exertion Carter collapsed after about four miles, leading to concerns about his health and questions about his re-election campaign.

Professional runner Herb Lindsay won the men's race in time in 30 minutes 0.1 seconds, about two minutes slower than his personal best over the distance. Marilyn Bevans won the women's race in 40 minutes 25.8 seconds.

== Background ==
Carter was a cross country runner for the Navy Midshipmen team in the 1940s, but he only began jogging recreationally in the fall of 1978.

Nike, Inc., Anheuser-Busch Natural Light, and Track Master sponsored the race, with Nike inviting some of their professionally sponsored runners like Lindsay to compete. There were also a host of amateur runners invited, ranging from an 11-year old boy to a grandfather in his 70s.

Carter's previous best time on the course in training was 50 minutes, and he was aiming for a 46-minute time (7 minutes 24 seconds per mile) on race day. Lindsay thought the course was particularly challenging for a beginner, although the Washington Post wrote, "The weather was cool, and the race was not considered challenging for a runner in training". Race day weather was officially recorded as 70 °F (21 °C) with nominal wind and clear skies. The course included two hills that altogether rose more than 350 feet (110 m) in less than half a mile.

== The race ==
Carter started near the front of the pack, splitting his first mile in 8 minutes 25 seconds uphill. His second mile was even faster in 7:45, but he started to slow after that.

The race was held on an out-and-back course, allowing the professional field to see Carter running down the hill as they ran back up it. Carter acknowledged Lindsay as he passed, calling out, "Give him room" to the other lead runners in the tight pack.

== Carter collapse ==
Approximately four miles into the race, Carter started to appear fatigued, with those around him commenting on his ashy face and drooping form. He had been running for about 52 minutes, and he was about 100 yards (91 m) away from the Camp David entrance. He wanted to continue running even as his doctor William Lukash urged him to stop. After Carter finally gave in, Lukash measured his heart rate as about 130 beats per minute, far above his resting heart rate of about 45 bpm. Carter was given smelling salts and at least 1 liter (0.22 imp gal; 0.26 U.S. gal) of salt water intravenously through his arm.

Hours after his treatment, Carter returned to the course to present awards in good health.

== Legacy ==
The incident was used by some to caution against running, citing risk of cardiac arrest or other marathon fatalities.

The event was noted by some as an analogy for Carter's poor political polling ahead of his 1980 re-election campaign. Some suggested he should drop out of the presidential race just as he dropped out of the footrace in favor of Democratic primary challenger Ted Kennedy.

One White House lieutenant said after the race, "I hope this will replace the rabbit stories".

A second race was proposed for September 13, 1980 at the same location, but it was ultimately not continued.

== Results ==
Though 898 runners were registered, only 750 started the race. Lindsay won the men's race in 30 minutes 0.1 seconds, followed by Dan Rincon. There was also an inter-departmental team race scored between the FBI, CIA, and Secret Service, which the FBI won. Carter blamed himself on the Secret Service's last-place team finish, saying that the agents had to follow his pace.

About 47 runners did not finish the race, including Carter.

Catoctin Mountain Park Run men's results
Pos.	Athlete	Age	Club	Time
1st place, gold medalist(s)	Herb Lindsay	24	Colorado Track Club	30:00.1
2nd place, silver medalist(s)	Dan Rincon	26	Washington Running Club	30:37.5
3rd place, bronze medalist(s)	Don Kardong	30	Club Northwest	31:07
4th	Terry Baker	23	Hagerstown RFFC	31:14
5th	Bob Snyder	23	Hagerstown RFFC	31:20
6th	John Doub	22	Hagerstown RFFC	31:23
7th	Stephen D. Gilmore	27	Washington Running Club	32:02
8th	Herm Atkins	31	Club Northwest	32:22
9th	Bruce Robinson	28	Washington Running Club	32:24
10th	Taylor Oliver	28	Hagerstown RFFC	32:51
11th	Chris Elliot	27		32:59
12th	Mark Stevenson	22	United States Marine Corps	33:04
13th	Brent Hawkins	26	West Virginia Track Club	33:36
14th	Steve Weinstein	23		34:17
15th	Mark Gibney	26	Northern Virginia Road Runners Club	34:35
16th	Glenn Wood	45	Potomac Valley Seniors Track Club	34:46
17th	Stephen Polasky	22		34:50
18th	Charles L. Ross	41	National Capitol Track Club	34:53
19th	David F. Dobrzynski	21	Nike, Inc.	35:03
20th	Mitchell Hamburger	22	University of Maryland	35:25
21st	Robert Proctor	20	Frederick Track Club	35:29
22nd	Thomas Mullen	37	FBI	35:39
23rd	Brenton E. Ayer	24	Limbo Track Club	35:41
24th	Harold Tinsley Sr.	42	Huntsville Track Club	35:43
25th	Dwayne Late	20	Hagerstown RFFC	35:43
26th	Bob Thurston	35	Washington Running Club	35:45
27th	John Mort	25	Washington Running Club	35:46
28th	Edward D. Sayre	26	Capitol Hill Pacers	35:56
29th	Phil Nicoll	17	Cumberland Valley Track Club	35:59
30th	Chandler Robbins	42	National Capitol Track Club	36:02
31st	Ed DeMarrais	48	North Medford Club	36:10
32nd	Tom Cook	32	Cumberland Valley Track Club	36:10
33rd	Dan Mangan	16	St. James School	36:11
34th	Rafael Malo	17	Fairmont Heights	36:17
35th	David Wittenburg	23	Mont. Co. Road Runners Club	36:20
36th	Jeff L. Myers	30		36:23
37th	Don Chaffee	40		36:24
38th	David Shafer	26	Hagerstown RRFC	36:25
39th	John A. Butterfield	42		36:37
40th	John P. Kennedy	36	Northern Virginia Road Runners Club	36:40
41st	Herbert B. Chisholm	53	Potomac Valley Seniors Track Club	36:43
42nd	David Hershiser	24	Thomas Jefferson Road Runners Club	36:51
43rd	W. Michael Welch	30		36:56
44th	Patrick Key	21		37:07
45th	Warren H. Ohlrich	40	NCTC	37:08
46th	Jeffrey James Wilkins	15	Bishop Ireton	37:10
47th	Matthew Klimow	27	United States Army	37:23
48th	Tristam C. Kruger	28		37:24
49th	Warren H. Haynie III	17	WRC / Baltimore Sans	37:28
50th	Jeffrey Roush	30	Harrisburg Area Road Runners Club	37:30
51st	Thomas P. Skelly	27	D.C. Harriers	37:43
52nd	Charles Brumley	39	Baltimore Road Runners Club	37:44
53rd	Andrew Butterfield	16	Boston Athletic Association	37:48
54th	Scott Palmer	15		37:55
55th	Jim Madigan	23		38:00
56th	J. Allan Quickel	17		38:03
57th	Allan J. Lichtman	32	Potomac Valley Seniors Track Club	38:04
58th	Chris Flavin	24	Worldwatch Institute	38:09
59th	David L. Watkins	43	Harrisburg Area Road Runners Club	38:11
60th	Michael MacWelch	16	Fairmont Heights	38:16
61st	Dave Biebel	17	Cumberland Valley Track Club	38:17
62nd	Michael P. Asip	26		38:17
63rd	Terry O'Connor	36	FBI	38:20
64th	Robert H. Driscoe	34		38:25
65th	Gary D. Knipling	35	D.C. Harriers	38:30
66th	David H. Graham	19		38:33
67th	Paul D. Caltabiano	25	FBI	38:33
68th	Michael Lieder	24		38:34
68th	George Hoffman III	16	Cumberland Valley Track Club	38:42
69th	Lucious Anderson	33		38:43
70th	David D. Schmidt	22	D.C. Road Runners Club	38:48
71st	Thomas A. Hassler	42	U.S. Navy	38:49
72nd	Frank Schaeffer	27		38:50
73rd	Robert F. Webb	32		38:51
74th	Robert Williams	37	Washington Running Club	38:52
75th	Rudy Lopez	17	St. James School	38:53
—N/a	Jimmy Carter	55		DNF

Catoctin Mountain Park Run women's results
Pos.	Athlete	Age	Club	Time
1st place, gold medalist(s)	Marilyn Bevans	29	Baltimore Sans	40:25.8
2nd place, silver medalist(s)	Margaret Horioka	24	Hagerstown RFFC	42:00
3rd place, bronze medalist(s)	Mary Ellen Williams	33	Hagerstown Running Club	42:20
4th	Carole Herrick	38	Washington Run Hers	42:24
5th	Mary Drengwitz	19		43:11
6th	Laura deWald	22	Thomas Jefferson Road Runners Club	43:14
7th	Dale Ann Koepenick	32		44:06
8th	Colleen Powers	26	Farmland National	44:12
9th	Marie Baumann	33	Washington Run Hers	44:13
10th	Ellen Wessel	28	Washington Run Hers	44:14
11th	Natalie Buzzell	46		44:46
12th	Brenda J. Frank	28		45:29
13th	Susan R. Cooper	28	Washington Run Hers	45:43
14th	Stephanie Shipp	25	DCRRC	46:07
15th	Noni Peterson	26		46:21
16th	Durinda Decker	22	Shepherd College	46:21
17th	Judith Graeff	31		46:26
18th	Karen Kokesh	27	St. Louis Track Club	47:35
19th	Janet A. Yu	23		47:37
20th	Priscilla Butterfield	40	Boston Athletic Association	47:37
21st	Claire Parkinson	31	NASA / Goddard	47:39
22nd	Linda M. Scott	38		47:43
23rd	Susanne Armstrong	39		48:11
24th	Mary F. Hanley	31	D.C. Harriers	48:20
25th	Elizabeth Guthrie	29		48:22
26th	Rachel Bourn	50	Tidewater Striders	48:28
27th	Janice Anderson	33	Potomac Valley Seniors Track Club	48:38
28th	Pamela Abraham	23	HRFFC	48:47
29th	Kay Snyder	20	West Virginia Track Club	49:06
30th	Bonnie Glessner	29		49:08
31st	Mary Ann Rogers	24		49:33
32nd	Mary Anne O'Donnel	26		49:35
33rd	Barbara Johnson	37		49:54
34th	Diana Ross	18		50:21
35th	Janet Lowe	24		50:30
36th	Vera Thornhill	13		50:36
37th	Mary A. Evans	26		50:39
38th	Nancy E. Riley	23	Baltimore Road Runners Club	50:54
39th	Mary Ostroff	27	Potomac Valley Seniors Track Club	51:22
40th	Judy Weber	35		51:36
41st	Jacquelene Miller	23		51:39
42nd	Judy Let	29		51:45
43rd	Mary L. Hamm	25		52:34
44th	Diana Allan	25	George Washington University Law School	52:45
45th	Linda Downes	33		52:49
46th	Pam Hause	25	Alan's Locker Room	52:56
47th	Coralee VanEdmond	24		52:58
48th	Bonnie Kerrigan	32	Thomas Jefferson Road Runners Club	53:14
49th	Anita M. O'Brien	26	Thomas Jefferson Road Runners Club	53:25
50th	Consuelo Gardner	27		53:35
51st	Sara Frankenfield	33		53:36
52nd	Mary Plumer	34	Baltimore Road Runners Club	53:45
53rd	Leslie Nuse	34		53:46
54th	Mollie Ingram	36		53:49
55th	Martha Hauver	41		54:01
56th	Sharon Metcalf	29	White House	54:04
57th	Marianne Joseph	36		54:08
58th	Dorothy Bright	54		54:22
59th	Kathryn B. Foster	35		54:27
60th	Marilyn Pierce	39		54:31
61st	Brenda Stup	24		55:03
62nd	Arleen Kuech	36	Howard County Striders	55:23
63rd	Patrice Pittman	27		55:37
64th	Karen Bryant	23		55:43
65th	Karyn Mandan	32	Thomas Jefferson Road Runners Club	55:55
66th	Louise Wynn	31		55:59
67th	Joan Marie Hargis	41	Frederick Steeplechasers	56:11
68th	Barbara Garner	40	Baltimore Road Runners Club	56:43
69th	Linda Ford	28	Baltimore Road Runners Club	56:46
70th	Peggy Bowers	38		56:52
71st	Elaine Jacobson	34	TWU	56:54
72nd	Patricia Turner	38		57:01
73rd	Penelope Richards	32		57:03
74th	Amber Dillard	14		57:16
75th	Nancy Enyon	48		57:17

"Inter-departmental rivalry" results
Pos.	Team
1st place, gold medalist(s)	Federal Bureau of Investigation
2nd place, silver medalist(s)	Central Intelligence Agency
3rd place, bronze medalist(s)	Secret Service
