= Herb Lindsay =

American long-distance runner

Medal record

Men's athletics

Representing the United States

Pan American Games
Silver medal – second place	1979 San Juan	5000 m

Herb Lindsay (born November 12, 1954) is an American former long-distance runner. He competed in track, road and cross country running disciplines. He was the silver medalist in the 5000-meter run at the 1979 Pan American Games, finishing behind compatriot Matt Centrowitz. He also represented his country at the 1982 IAAF World Cross Country Championships, coming 69th overall and sixth in the team rankings.

== Career ==
Born in Michigan, he grew up in a rural area in Grand Rapids, then Reed City. He was the youngest of six children, with three older sisters and two brothers. He attended Reed City High School and began racing there, earning high school state championships in cross country and distance track events.

After gaining a track scholarship, he competed athletically for the Michigan State Spartans and was an NCAA All-American for them in cross country in 1974 and 1976. He placed third at the 1976 NCAA Division I Men's Cross Country Championships. He was a one-time national champion, taking the 10K run American title in 1979, becoming the second man to win the title after Bill Rodgers (runner). Lindsay's winning time of 28:35 minutes remained the championship best until 1996, when it was beaten by Matt Giusto. His best national placing on the track was at the 1979 USA Outdoor Track and Field Championships, where he was third in the 5000 m. He also won a 5000 m title at the U.S. Olympic Festival in 1979 and was the 1979 runner-up at the USA Cross Country Championships behind Alberto Salazar.

On the road running circuit, Lindsay was highly successful, with his best performance being a world record of 61:47 minutes for the half marathon in Manchester, Vermont in 1981. This record stood for one day short of a year, with Michael Musyoki knocking eleven seconds of the record. During his career he won the Saint Silvester Road Race, Bolder Boulder, Fifth Third River Bank Run, the Crim 10-miler (three times) and the Cascade Run Off (twice). He was also runner-up at the Falmouth Road Race twice. He played a part in professionalization of the sport, with races between him and other top road racers such as Frank Shorter and Stan Mavis leading to the setting up of trust funds, allowing them to be paid yet retain their amateur (and thus Olympics-eligible) status.

== International competitions ==
Year	Competition	Venue	Position	Event	Notes
1979	55ª Corrida de São Silvestre	São Paulo, Brazil	1st	9000 m	23:26.0
1979	Pan American Games	San Juan, Puerto Rico	2nd	5000 m	14:04.1
1982	World Cross Country Championships	Rome, Italy	69th	Senior race	35:28.9
1982	World Cross Country Championships	Rome, Italy	6th	Team	300 pts

== National titles ==
- USA 10K Championships: 1979

== Circuit wins ==
- Saint Silvester Road Race: 1979
- Bolder Boulder: 1984
- Fifth Third River Bank Run: 1981
- Crim Festival of Races: 1979, 1980, 1981
- Cascade Run Off: 1979, 1980

== See also ==
- Catoctin Mountain Park Run

Records
Preceded by Stan Mavis	Half marathon world record holder September 20, 1981 – September 19, 1982	Succeeded by Michael Musyoki
