= Stan Mavis =

American distance runner (born 1955)

Personal information
- Born: February 26, 1955 (age 71) United States

Sport
- Country: United States
- Events: 5 km, 10 km, Half Marathon, Marathon

Achievements and titles
- Personal bests: 5 km: 13:43 10000 m: 28:13; 10k road: 28:47; 15k road: 44:15 Half Marathon: 1:04:07

Stan Mavis (born February 26, 1955), is an American former professional long-distance runner.

Mavis attended Michigan State University on a track and field scholarship in 1973. After graduating, he turned pro, running for the Athletics West Track Club. In 1980, Stan's time of 1:02:16 at the Natural Light Half Marathon broke the IAAF Half Marathon World Record. Mavis placed 10th in the 1980 US Olympic Trials despite the fact that the US boycotted the 1980 Summer Olympics . After Retiring, Mavis became involved in the sporting good business. In 2002, Mavis joined Brooks Running and served as the senior vice president of product there. He co-founded the Pearl Izumi brand and led the Brooks Sports and Sugoi Performance Apparel store. In 2009, Mavis was inducted into the Colorado Running Hall of Fame.

== Competition record ==
Date	Event	Distance	Venue	Time	Finished
29 June 1980	Natural Light Half Marathon	Half Marathon	Saugatuck MI, USA	1:05:01	1st
27 January 1980	Natural Light Half Marathon	Half Marathon	Saugatuck MI, USA	1:02:16	1st
3 July 1982	Pepsi Challenge National Championships	10 km	New York NY, USA	29:00	7th
5 April 1980	Nike Club Championships	10 km	San Diego CA, USA	29:01	5th
16 June 1979	National AAU Championships	5 km	Walnut CA, USA	13:43.1	4th
26 September 1981	KFWB South Coast Classic	10 km	Irvine CA, USA	28:47	1st
4 July 1980	Chicago Distance Classic	20 km	Chicago IL, USA	1:01:23	2nd
21-29 July 1980	US Olympic Trials	10,000 metres	Eugene OR, USA	28:38.6	10th

Records
Preceded by Kirk Pfeffer	Men's Half Marathon World Record Holder; 27 January 1980 – 20 September 1981	Succeeded by Herb Lindsay
