= Cayman Islands at the 2014 Winter Olympics =

- Flag of the Cayman Islands
- IOC code: CAY
- NOC: Cayman Islands Olympic Committee
- Website: www.caymanolympic.org.ky

in Sochi
- Competitors: 1 in 1 sport
- Flag bearer: Dow Travers
- Medals: Gold 0 Silver 0 Bronze 0 Total 0

Winter Olympics appearances (overview)
- 2010; 2014; 2018–2022; 2026

The Cayman Islands sent a delegation to compete at the 2014 Winter Olympics in Sochi, Russia from 7–23 February 2014. This was the territory's second appearance at a Winter Olympics, following their debut four years prior. The Caymanian delegation consisted of four officials and one athlete, alpine skier Dow Travers, who failed to complete either of his events. The Cayman Islands have yet to compete in the Winter Olympics after these Olympics.

== Background ==
The Cayman Islands Olympic Committee was first recognized by the International Olympic Committee on 31 December 1975. Cayman Islands then first entered Olympic competition in 1976 at the Montreal Olympics. They have participated in every Summer Olympics since, except the boycotted 1980 Moscow Olympics. The territory has never won a medal in Olympic competition. The Cayman Islands made their Winter Olympic Games debut in Vancouver at the 2010 Winter Olympics. The delegation to Sochi consisted of five people, alpine skier Dow Travers; chef de mission David Carmichael; coach Jake Zamansky; Donald McLean and Bernie Bush, respectively the president and treasurer of the Cayman Islands Olympic Committee. Travers was selected as the flag bearer for both the opening ceremony and closing ceremony.

== Alpine skiing ==
According to the final quota allocation released on January 20, 2014, the Cayman Islands had one athlete in qualification position. That spot went to Dow Travers, who was 26 years old at the time of the Sochi Olympics. He had previously represented the Cayman Islands at the 2010 Winter Olympics. Travers injured himself in training about a month before the Games, it required stitches and kept him off his skis for around ten days. On 19 February, Travers crashed during the giant slalom competition, and suffered a mild concussion. Two days later, he competed in the slalom, finishing the first leg in a time of 1 minute and 7 seconds, but he failed to finish the second run of the race.

Athlete	Event	Run 1		Run 2		Total	
Athlete	Event	Time	Rank	Time	Rank	Time	Rank
Dow Travers	Men's giant slalom	DNF					
Dow Travers	Men's slalom	1:07.03	76	DNF			

== See also ==
- Cayman Islands at the 2014 Commonwealth Games
- Cayman Islands at the 2014 Summer Youth Olympics
