= Cayman Islands at the 2009 World Championships in Athletics =

- WA code: CAY

in Berlin
- Competitors: 2 (1 man, 1 woman)
- Medals: Gold 0 Silver 0 Bronze 0 Total 0

World Championships in Athletics appearances
- 1987; 1991; 1993; 1995; 1997; 1999; 2001; 2003; 2005; 2007; 2009; 2011; 2013; 2015; 2017; 2019; 2022; 2023; 2025

The Cayman Islands competed at the 2009 World Championships in Athletics in Berlin, Germany, which were held from 15 to 23 August 2009. The athlete delegation consisted of two competitors, sprinters Kemar Hyman and Cydonie Mothersill. Hyman competed in the men's 100 metres and was eliminated during the preliminaries. Mothersill competed in the women's 200 metres and reached the semifinals before being eliminated.

== Background ==
The 2009 World Championships in Athletics were held at the Olympiastadion in Berlin, Germany. Under the auspices of the International Amateur Athletic Federation, this was the twelfth edition of the World Championships. It was held from 15 to 23 August 2009 and had 47 different events. Among the competing teams was the Cayman Islands. For this edition of the World Championships in Athletics, sprinters Kemar Hyman and Cydonie Mothersill competed for the team. This was Mothersill's sixth and final appearance for the team at the World Championships.

== Results ==
=== Men ===
Hyman competed in the preliminary heats of the men's 100 metres on 15 August 2009 in the eleventh heat against six other competitors. There, he recorded a time of 10.59 seconds and placed fourth, failing to advance further as only the top three in each heat and the next four fastest athletes would be able to do so.

Event	Athletes	Heats		Quarterfinal		Semifinal		Final	
Event	Athletes	Result	Rank	Result	Rank	Result	Rank	Result	Rank
100 m	Kemar Hyman	10.59	4	did not advance					

=== Women ===
Mothersill competed in the preliminary heats of the women's 200 metres on 19 August 2009 in the fifth heat against six other competitors. There, she recorded a time of 22.69 seconds and placed first, advancing further to the semifinals as she was in the top three of her heat. In the semifinals held the next day, Mothersill competed in the second semifinal against seven other competitors. There, she recorded a time of 22.80 seconds and placed fourth, failing to advance to the finals as only the top two in each semifinal and the next two fastest athletes would be able to do so.

Event	Athletes	Heats		Semifinal		Final	
Event	Athletes	Result	Rank	Result	Rank	Result	Rank
200 m	Cydonie Mothersill	22.69	1	22.80	10	did not advance	
