= Cayman Islands at the 2010 Winter Olympics =

- IOC code: CAY
- NOC: Cayman Islands Olympic Committee
- Website: www.caymanolympic.org.ky

in Vancouver
- Competitors: 1 in 1 sport
- Flag bearer: Dow Travers
- Medals: Gold 0 Silver 0 Bronze 0 Total 0

Winter Olympics appearances (overview)
- 2010; 2014; 2018–2022; 2026; 2030

The Cayman Islands sent a delegation to compete at the 2010 Winter Olympics in Vancouver, British Columbia, Canada, held between 12–28 February 2010. The territory made its debut at the Winter Olympics, sending one athlete, alpine skier Dow Travers. Travers entered the men's giant slalom and finished in 69th place.

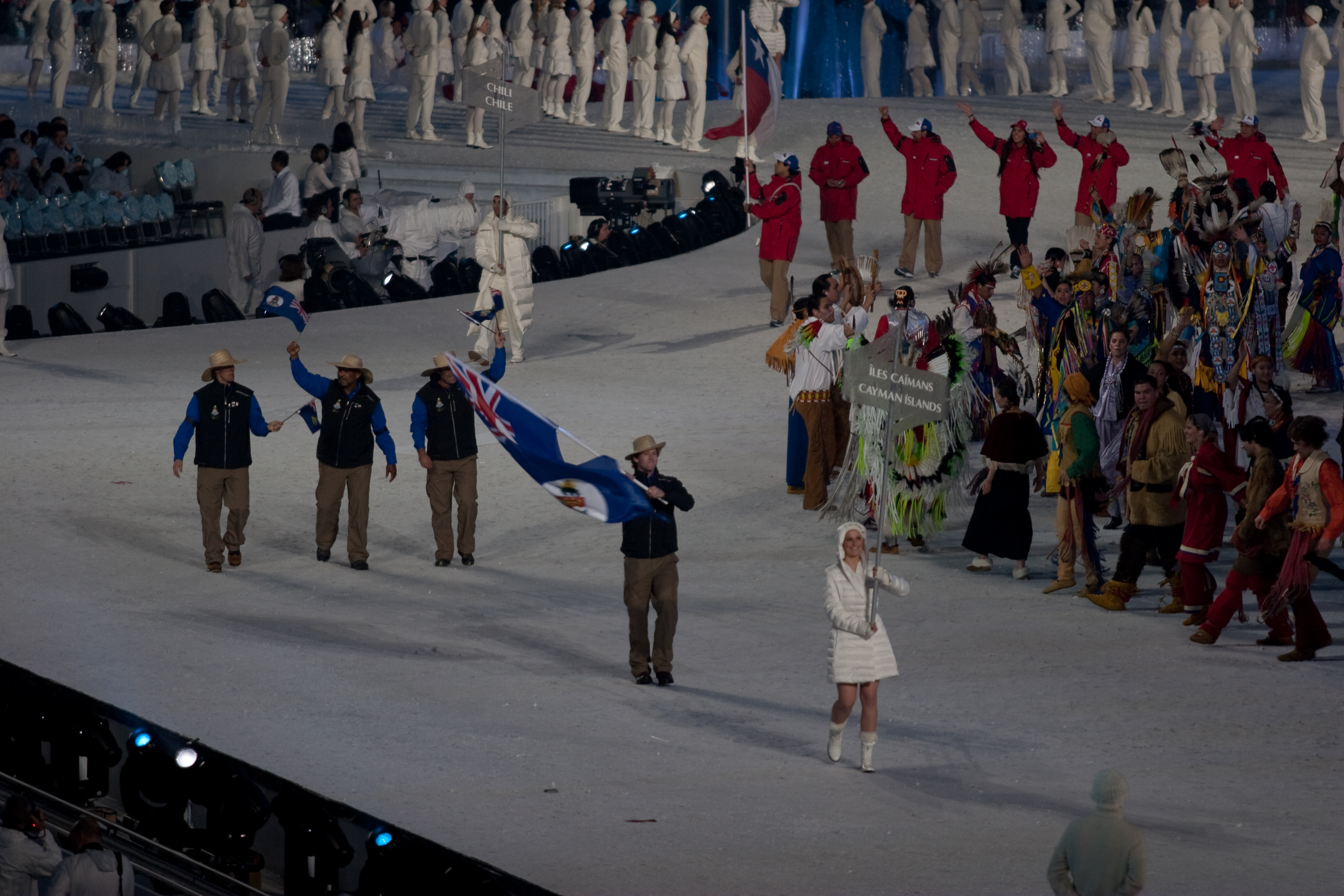
The delegation entering the stadium during the opening ceremonies.

== Background ==
The Cayman Islands first entered Olympic competition in 1976 at the Montreal Olympics. They have participated in every Summer Olympics since, except the boycotted 1980 Moscow Olympics. The territory has never won a medal in Olympic competition. The Cayman Islands has made their Winter Olympic Games debut in Vancouver. The Caymanian delegation consisted of a single competitor, alpine skier Dow Travers. Travers was chosen as the flag bearer for both the opening ceremony and the closing ceremony.

== Alpine Skiing ==
Dow Travers secured qualification to the Vancouver Olympics at a skiing competition in Chile. He said upon qualifying, "I am feeling very Olympic today." Travers was 22 years old at the time of the Games. The only event he was entered into was the men's giant slalom, which took place on 23 February. He posted run times of 1 minute 29 seconds and 1 minute 33 seconds, for a combined total time of 3 minutes and 2 seconds. This put him in 69th place out of 81 competitors who finished both runs, and the gold medal time was a combined 2 minutes and 37 seconds.

Athlete	Event	Run 1	Run 2	Total	Rank
Dow Travers	Men's giant slalom	1:29.39	1:33.50	3:02.89	69

== See also ==
- Cayman Islands at the Olympics
