= Sika Henry =

American athlete

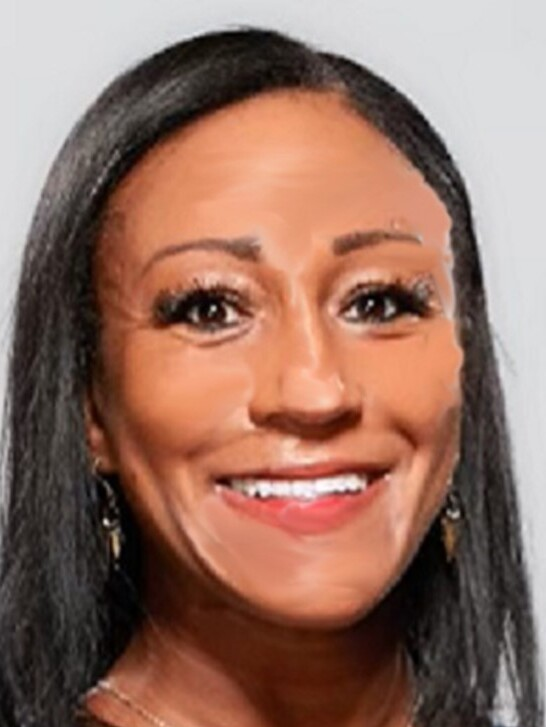
Sika Henry

Sika Henry is an American triathlete and ultramarathoner. When she completed the Challenge Cancun event in 2021, Henry became the first female African-American professional triathlete. She has advocated for increased representation in the sport.
