= Athletics at the 2013 Island Games =

- Dates: 15 – 19 July
- Host city: (Bermuda) Hamilton
- Venue: Bermuda National Stadium
- Level: Senior
- Events: 39

Athletics, for the 2013 Island Games, was held at the Bermuda National Stadium in Devonshire Parish, Bermuda. It took place from 15 – 19 July 2013.

== Medal table ==
Final medal tally, based on the 2013 IG Athletics Medal Table page:

* Host nation (Bermuda)

Rank	Nation	Gold	Silver	Bronze	Total
1	Bermuda*	10	5	11	26
2	Isle of Man	6	7	2	15
3	Cayman Islands	6	4	2	12
4	Saare County	6	3	1	10
5	Jersey	3	4	2	9
6	Guernsey	2	4	1	7
7	Faroe Islands	2	2	4	8
8	Western Isles	2	2	2	6
9	(Anglesey) Ynys Môn	1	2	4	7
10	Shetland	1	1	0	2
11	Orkney	0	3	1	4
12	Gotland	0	2	3	5
13	Åland	0	0	2	2
14	Gibraltar	0	0	1	1
Totals (14 entries)		39	39	36	114

== Results ==
=== Men ===
Event	Gold		Silver		Bronze	
100 metres	Harold Houston (BER)	10.34	Rhymiech Adolphus (CAY)	10.63	Mats Boman (ALA)	10.83
200 metres	Harold Houston (BER)	21.05	David Hamil (CAY)	22.28	Mats Boman (ALA)	22.33
400 metres	Joseph Reid (IOM)	48.48	Donald Macleod (Western Isles)	48.88	Robert Stenhouse (Jersey)	49.21
800 metres	Donald Macleod (Western Isles)	1:54.87	Elliott Dorey (Jersey)	1:55.41	Dage Minors (BER)	1:55.79
1,500 metres	Elliott Dorey (Jersey)	3:55.64	Ryan Fairclough (IOM)	3:57.88	Dage Minors (BER)	4:01.22
5,000 metres	Iolo Hughes (Anglesey)	15:34.38	Oliver Lockley (IOM)	15:36.11	Marnar Djurhuus (FRO)	15:46.70
10,000 metres	Kevin Loundes (IOM)	32:13.07	Thomas Fay (Orkney)	32:43.79	Marnar Djurhuus (FRO)	33:14.40
110 metres hurdles	Tristan Joynes (BER)	14.69	Glenn Etherington (GGY)	14.76	Not awarded	
400 metres hurdles	Sam Wallbridge (GGY)	55.66	Rheon Jones (Anglesey)	n/a	Not awarded	
3,000 metres steeplechase	Alan Corlett (IOM)	10:31.81	Daniel Edward Robinson (Jersey)	10:45.63	Henrik Reintz (Gotland)	11:19.05
4×100 metres relay	Cayman Islands; Rhymiech Adolphus; David Hamil; Carl Morgan; Carlos Morgan	41.10	Bermuda; Bruce DeGrilla; Ethan Philip; Jaret Simmons; Chas Smith	43.80	Anglesey; Michael Bland; Connor Laverty; Christopher McNaught; Aled Thomas	44.42
4×400 metres relay	Jersey; Elliot Dorey; Ben Silva; Robert Stenhouse; Oliver Terry	3:24.81	Bermuda; Darico Clarke; Kyree Govia; Dage Minors; Ethan Philip	3:25.70	Anglesey; Michael Bland; Rheon Jones; Christopher McNaught; Aled Thomas	3:27.89
Half-Marathon	Kevin Loundes (IOM)	1:14:38	Thomas Fay (Orkney)	1:17:08	Edward Gumbley (IOM)	1:18:41
Half-marathon team	Isle of Man; Alan Corlett; Edward Gumbley; Kevin Loundes	1	Guernsey; Tristan Robilliard; Ben Wilen; Michael Wilesmith	2	Orkney; Thomas Fay; Paul Kerr	3
High jump	Jahnhai Perinchief (BER)	2.01m	Øssur Debes Eiriksfoss (FRO)	2.01m	Chas Smith (BER)	1.98m
Long jump	Carl Morgan (CAY)	7.46m	Carlos Morgan (CAY)	7.45m	Bruce DeGrilla (BER)	7.33m
Triple jump	Carl Morgan (CAY)	15.37m	Øssur Debes Eiriksfoss (FRO)	14.34m	Carlos Morgan (CAY)	14.10m
Shot put	Genro Paas (Saaremaa)	15.84m	Erik Larsson (Gotland)	14.33m	Connor Laverty (Anglesey)	13.35m
Discus throw	Genro Paas (Saaremaa)	46.31m	Erik Larsson (Gotland)	43.34m	Heri Ziska (FRO)	39.77m
Javelin throw	Alexander Pascal (CAY)	70.66m	Sander Suurhans (Saaremaa)	62.76m	Rógvi Højgaard (FRO)	54.05m

=== Women ===
Event	Gold		Silver		Bronze	
100 metres	Ameilia Gillispie (CAY)	12.28	Natasha Trott (BER)	12.39	Sophie Lewis-Canyers (Anglesey)	12.71
200 metres	Shianne Smith (BER)	24.87	Ameilia Gillispie (CAY)	25.26	Natasha Trott (BER)	25.71
400 metres	Hazel Le Cornu (Jersey)	58.16	Emma Leask (Shetland Islands)	58.59	Rachel Fox (BER)	59.61
800 metres	Emma Leask (Shetland Islands)	2:11.37	Tamika Williams (BER)	2:11.55	Eilidh Mackenzie (Western Isles)	2:13.51
1,500 metres	Eilidh Mackenzie (Western Isles)	4:33.26	Sarah Mercier (GGY)	4:33.56	Tamika Williams (BER)	4:33.57
5,000 metres	Sarah Mercier (GGY)	17:34.63	Sarah Livett (Anglesey)	18:30.17	Emma Jane Montiel (GIB)	18:36.20
10,000 metres	Valborg Heinesen (FRO)	38:01.20	Gail Griffiths (IOM)	38:14.62	Ashley Estwanik (BER)	38:47.61
100 metres hurdles	Ameilia Gillispie (CAY)	14.69	Hannah Riley (IOM)	14.81	Shianne Smith (BER)	15.95
400 metres hurdles	Shianne Smith (BER)	1:01.56	Hazel le Cornu (Jersey)	1:07.18	Not awarded	
4×100 metres relay	Bermuda; Jasmine Brunson; Kerri Furbert; Shianne Smith; Natasha Trott	48.33	Isle of Man; Charlotte Bawden; Andrea de Bruin; Bethan Pilley; Hannah Riley	51.35	Jersey; Helen Victoria Butler; Gemma Dawkins; Hazel le Cornu; Katie Silva	51.55
4×400 metres relay	Bermuda; Ashley Berry; Shianne Smith; Natasha Trott; Tamika Williams	3:57.78	Jersey; Helen Victoria Butler; Gemma Dawkins; Hazel le Cornu; Katie Silva	4:01.75	Western Isles; Eve Carrington; Eilidh Mackenzie; Jenny MacTaggart	4:08.86
Half-Marathon	Valborg Heinesen (FRO)	1:25:37	Gail Griffiths (IOM)	1:26:40	Hannah Howard (IOM)	1:29:22
Half-marathon team	Isle of Man; Gail Griffiths; Hannah Howard; Rebecca Wallace	1	Western Isles; Doleen Galbraith; Christina Mackenzie	2	Bermuda; Deon Breary; Victoria Fiddick; Rose-Anna Hoey	3
High jump	Linda Treiel (Saaremaa)	1.78m	Ashleigh Nalty (CAY)	1.75m	Kaie Kand (Saaremaa)	1.69m
Long jump	Kaie Kand (Saaremaa)	5.71m	Kerri Furbert (BER)	5.57m	Linn Gustafsson (ALA)	5.51m
Triple jump	Jasmine Brunson (BER)	12.64m	Kaire Nurja (Saaremaa)	12.15m	Akeila Richardson (BER)	10.56m
Shot put	Linda Treiel (Saaremaa)	14.16m	Kaie Kand (Saaremaa)	12.41m	Ellinor Sundstrand (Gotland)	9.89m
Discus throw	Linda Treiel (Saaremaa)	39.64m	Andrea de Bruin (IOM)	36.25m	Kristina Jacobsson (Gotland)	34.32m
Javelin throw	Shianne Smith (BER)	39.09m	Thora Cant (Orkney)	37.51m	Zoe Fitch (GGY)	34.96m
