= Dow Travers =

Caymanian alpine skier

Personal information
- Born: July 8, 1987 (age 39) Grand Cayman
- Height: 180 cm (5 ft 11 in)
- Weight: 86 kg (190 lb)

Sport
- Country: Cayman Islands
- Sport: Alpine skiing

Dow Travers (born July 8, 1987) is a Caymanian alpine skier, rugby union player and entrepreneur, who competes in giant slalom and Rugby XVs and 7s. He represented the Cayman Islands in alpine skiing at the 2010 Winter Olympics, becoming the Cayman Islands' first Winter Olympian, and the 2014 Winter Olympics. Travers, who is the son of Anthony Travers, was born and raised in Grand Cayman, where he attended Faulkner's Academy. He later went to boarding school at Harrow School in London, United Kingdom, Brown University which he represented for rugby and skiing, and Columbia Business School. Travers has younger brothers, Dillon and Dean. Dean is also a competitive skier for the Cayman Islands. He founded Refuel in the Cayman Islands in 2017.

In skiing, Travers has competed in the Winter Olympics and the World Championships for the Cayman Islands. At the Vancouver Olympics Travers placed 69th in the giant slalom. At the Sochi Olympics Travers received a DNF (did not finish) result in the giant slalom and the slalom. Travers placed 65th in the slalom event at the Val d'Isere World Championships.

In rugby, Travers has played for the Cayman Islands national rugby union team and currently plays on their 7s team in the North America Caribbean Rugby Association (NACRA) region. Travers was a member of the Cayman Islands 7s team at the Central American and Caribbean Games (CAC Games) in July 2010. Playing for Brown, he was selected for the All Ivy Rugby Team his freshman, sophomore, junior and senior years. In 2010 he was elected co-captain of the Brown Rugby Football Club. In 2011 he was selected for the New England All Stars team and captained the Brown 7s team to an Ivy League championship.

Olympic Games
Preceded by Ronald Forbes	Flagbearer for Cayman Islands; Vancouver 2010	Succeeded by Kemar Hyman
Preceded by Kemar Hyman	Flagbearer for Cayman Islands; Sochi 2014	Succeeded by Ronald Forbes
