= Michael Musyoki =

Kenyan long-distance runner

Personal information
- Born: May 28, 1956 (age 70)

Sport
- Country: Kenya
- Sport: Track, Long-distance running
- Events: 3000 metres, 5000 metres, 10,000 metres, Marathon
- College team: UTEP

Achievements and titles
- Personal bests: 3000 metres: 7:46.4; 5000 metres: 13:24.89; 10,000 metres: 27:41.92; Marathon: 2:10:30
Medal record
Men's Athletics
Representing Kenya
Olympic Games
Bronze medal – third place	1984 Los Angeles	10,000 m
All-Africa Games
Silver medal – second place	1978 Algiers	5,000 metres
Silver medal – second place	1978 Algiers	10,000 metres

Michael Musyoki (born May 28, 1956) is a retired long-distance runner from Kenya. He won the bronze medal in 10,000 metres at the 1984 Summer Olympics.

== Running career ==
=== Collegiate ===
Musyoki was recruited by University of Texas at El Paso, a school which was building a star-studded team of distance-runners in the late 1970s. Suleiman Nyambui and Musyoki were UTEP's two premier foreign distance-runner recruits at the time, and finished in first and second place respectively in the 10,000 metre race at the 1979 NCAA Outdoor Track Championships.

=== Post-collegiate ===
At the 1978 Commonwealth Games Musyoki was the silver medalist behind compatriot Henry Rono. At the 1978 All-Africa Games, Musyoki was the silver medalist in both the 5000m and 10000m. In 1982 he broke the half marathon world record by running 61:36 in Philadelphia and broke it again four years later with 1:00:43 at the 1986 Great North Run. He was also an active road racer and won "Road Racer of the Year" award in 1983 given by Running Times.

Musyoki won bronze in the 10,000 metres at the 1984 Summer Olympics, finishing third in an extremely close finish. Musyoki was only 0.24 seconds behind silver medalist Mike McLeod of Great Britain and just four-hundredths of a second in front of Salvatore Antibo of Italy.

Sporting positions
Preceded by (United States) Herb Lindsay	Men's Half Marathon Best Year Performance; 1982	Succeeded by (United States) Paul Cummings
Preceded by (United States) Mark Curp	Men's Half Marathon Best Year Performance; 1986	Succeeded by (South Africa) Matthew Temane
