= Michele Bush-Cuke =

Caymanian athlete

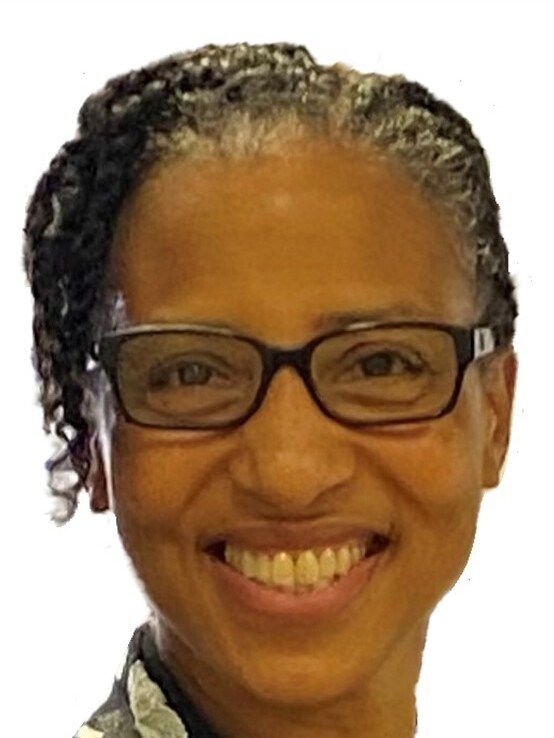

Personal information
- Nationality: Caymanian
- Born: Michele Bush; 3 October 1961 (age 64)

Sport
- Sport: Long-distance running
- Event: Marathon

Michele Bush-Cuke (born 3 October 1961) is a Caymanian long-distance runner. She competed in the 10,000 metres at the 1987 World Championships without reaching the final, and finished 52nd in the women's marathon at the 1988 Summer Olympics.

Her personal best marathon pace is 2 hours and 37 minutes. She graduated in 1979 from Rolling Hills High School. She was inducted into the National Black Distance Running Hall of Fame by the National Black Marathoners Association (NBMA) in 2022. She was also featured in the NBMA's feature-length documentary entitled Breaking Three Hours: Trailblazing African American Women Marathoners.
