= Marilyn Bevans =

African-American marathon runner

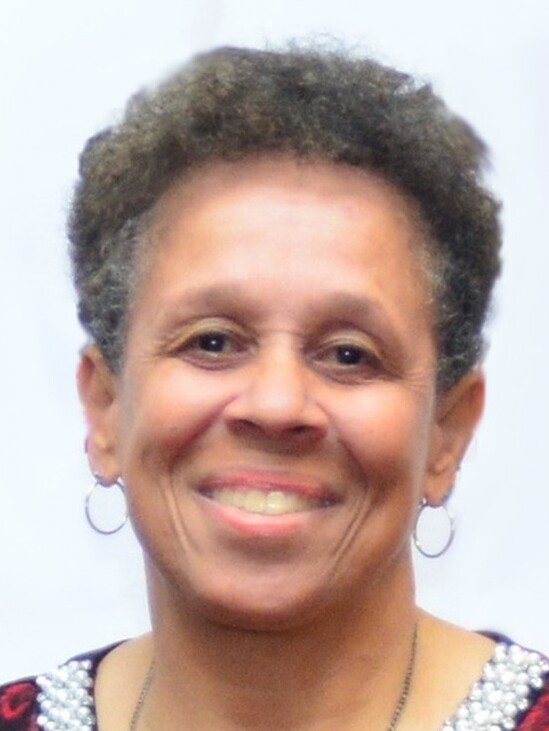

Personal information
- Nationality: American
- Born: October 4, 1949 (age 76) Baltimore, Maryland, U.S.

Sport
- Sport: Long-distance running
- Event: Marathon

Achievements and titles
- Personal best: Marathon: 2:49:56

Marilyn Bevans is an American former marathon runner. She became the first sub-three-hour, African-American female marathon runner, and the first national-class black female American marathoner.

Bevans came in second place at the 1973 Maryland Marathon with a time of 3:31:45, and again came in second at the 1977 Boston Marathon, where she ran 2:51:12. In 1977, she was ranked as the 10th fastest female marathoner in the world by Track & Field News. Her personal best came in 1979, when she ran 2:49:56 at the 1979 Boston Marathon. From 2013, her occupation included being a mid-distance and long-distance running coach at Baltimore's Perry Hall High School. She has been named All-Metro Coach of the Year twice.

Bevans was inducted into the National Black Marathoners Association's Distance Runner Hall of Fame in 2013, as part of their first class of inductees. She was also named as one of the 2014 Heroes of Running by Runner's World.

She has a BS in education from Morgan State University along with MA and MS degrees in curriculum development from Springfield College.

== See also ==
- Catoctin Mountain Park Run
