= Kemar Hyman =

Caymanian sprinter (born 1989)

Personal information
- Nationality: Cayman Islands
- Born: 11 October 1989 (age 36) George Town, Cayman Islands
- Height: 1.78 m (5 ft 10 in)
- Weight: 74 kg (163 lb)

Sport
- Sport: Running
- Events: 100 metres, 200 metres
- College team: Florida State Seminoles

Achievements and titles
- Personal bests: 100 m: 9.95 (Madrid 2012); 200 m: 20.73 (Athens 2016) 60m: 6.56 (Alabama 2012)
Medal record
Men's athletics
Representing the Cayman Islands
CARIFTA Games
Silver medal – second place	2007 Providenciales	200 m
CAC Junior Championships
Bronze medal – third place	2006 Port of Spain	4×100 m relay
- Updated on 12 December 2014

Kemar Hyman (born 11 October 1989) is a Caymanian sprinter. He graduated from Florida State University with an Economic Degree. Whilst competing for Florida State University he became the 2012 ACC indoor and outdoor champion and placed third at the 2012 indoor NCAA championships. Hyman is the national record holder in the 100 and 200 metres. Kemar holds the 60m record with Olympian Kareem Streete-Thompson in 6.56 seconds.

Hyman first represented the Cayman Islands at the 2009 World Championships in Athletics in the 100 metres he also became an Olympian at the 2012 London Olympics and was the flag bearer for Cayman Islands in the opening ceremony.

He is a native of George Town, Cayman Islands.

== Personal bests ==
=== Outdoor ===
- 100 m: 9.95 s (wind: +1.8 m/s) – Madrid, Spain, 7 July 2012
- 200 m: 20.73 s (wind: +0.8 m/s) – Athens, United States, 9 April 2016

=== Indoor ===
- 60 m: 6.56 s – Birmingham, United States, 21 January 2012
- 200 m: 21.42 s – Blacksburg, United States, 22 January 2011

== International competitions ==
Year	Competition	Venue	Position	Event	Notes
Representing the Cayman Islands
2005	CARIFTA Games (U17)	Bacolet, Trinidad and Tobago	7th	100m	11.17 (+1.5 m/s)
2005	CARIFTA Games (U17)	Bacolet, Trinidad and Tobago	4th	200m	22.51 (-1.0 m/s)
2005	Pan American Junior Championships	Windsor, Canada	6th	4 × 100 m	41.49
2005	World Youth Championships	Marrakesh, Morocco	2nd (h)^{1}	100m	10.80 (+0.6 m/s)
2005	World Youth Championships	Marrakesh, Morocco	7th (sf)	200m	22.00 (+1.2 m/s)
2006	CARIFTA Games (U20)	Les Abymes, Guadeloupe	6th	100m	10.79 (0.0 m/s)
2006	CARIFTA Games (U20)	Les Abymes, Guadeloupe	3rd (h)^{2}	200m	22.33 (+1.0 m/s)
2006	CARIFTA Games (U20)	Les Abymes, Guadeloupe	5th	4 × 100 m	41.58
2006	Central American and Caribbean; Junior Championships (U20)	Port of Spain, Trinidad and Tobago	4th (h)	100m	10.80 (+1.3 m/s)
2006	Central American and Caribbean; Junior Championships (U20)	Port of Spain, Trinidad and Tobago	4th	200m	21.37 (+1.4 m/s)
2006	Central American and Caribbean; Junior Championships (U20)	Port of Spain, Trinidad and Tobago	3rd	4 × 100 m	40.79
2006	World Junior Championships	Beijing, China	18th (sf)	100m	10.81 (-0.4 m/s)
2006	World Junior Championships	Beijing, China	19th (sf)	200m	21.54 (-1.0 m/s)
2006	World Junior Championships	Beijing, China	18th (h)	4 × 100 m	40.92
2007	CARIFTA Games (U20)	Providenciales, Turks and Caicos Islands	6th	100m	10.61 (+1.2 m/s)
2007	CARIFTA Games (U20)	Providenciales, Turks and Caicos Islands	2nd	200m	21.10 (+0.7 m/s)
2007	CARIFTA Games (U20)	Providenciales, Turks and Caicos Islands	6th	4 × 100 m	41.90
2007	Pan American Junior Championships	São Paulo, Brazil	7th (sf)	100m	10.73 (+0.4 m/s)
2007	Pan American Junior Championships	São Paulo, Brazil	5th	200m	21.51 (+0.9 m/s)
2007	NACAC Championships	San Salvador, El Salvador	12th (h)	100m	10.71 (-1.9 m/s)
2007	NACAC Championships	San Salvador, El Salvador	4th	4 × 100 m	40.01
2008	World Junior Championships	Bydgoszcz, Poland	8th	100m	10.79 (-0.8 m/s)
2008	World Junior Championships	Bydgoszcz, Poland	4th (h)	200m	21.81 (+0.4 m/s)
2009	Central American and Caribbean Championships	Havana, Cuba	10th (h)	100m	10.42 (+0.0 m/s)
2009	Central American and Caribbean Championships	Havana, Cuba	12th (h)	200m	21.23 (+0.5 m/s)
2009	Central American and Caribbean Championships	Havana, Cuba	5th	4 × 100 m	39.54
2009	World Championships	Berlin, Germany	59th (h)	100m	10.59 (-0.2 m/s)
2011	Central American and Caribbean Championships	Mayagüez, Puerto Rico	2nd (h)^{3}	100m	10.40 (-0.9 m/s)
2012	Olympic Games	London, United Kingdom	4th (h)^{2}	100m	10.16 (+1.5 m/s)
2013	World Championships	Moscow, Russia	–	100m	DQ
2014	World Relays	Nassau, Bahamas	18th (h)	4 × 100 m	39.76
2014	World Relays	Nassau, Bahamas	10th (h)	4 × 200 m	1:24.91
2014	Commonwealth Games	Glasgow, United Kingdom	6th (sf)	100m	10.31 (0.0 m/s)
2014	Commonwealth Games	Glasgow, United Kingdom	5th (h)	4 × 100 m	40.50
2014	Central American and Caribbean Games	Xalapa, Mexico	6th (h)	100m	10.78 A (+0.4 m/s)
2015	NACAC Championships	San José, Costa Rica	5th	100m	10.21 (-0.1 m/s)
2015	World Championships	Beijing, China	38th (h)	100 m	10.32
2016	World Indoor Championships	Portland, United States	11th (sf)	60 m	6.61
2016	Olympic Games	Rio de Janeiro, Brazil	45th (h)	100 m	10.34
2018	World Indoor Championships	Birmingham, United Kingdom	–	60 m	DQ
2018	Commonwealth Games	Gold Coast, Australia	5th	100 m	10.21
2019	Pan American Games	Lima, Peru	13th (h)	100 m	10.44
2019	World Championships	Doha, Qatar	37th (h)	100 m	10.37
2020	Olympic Games	Tokyo, Japan	49th (h)	100 m	10.41
2022	NACAC Championships	Freeport, Bahamas	13th (h)	100 m	10.62

^{1}: Disqualified in the semifinal.
^{2}: Did not show in the semifinal.
^{3}: Disqualified in the final.

Olympic Games
Preceded by Dow Travers	Flagbearer for Cayman Islands; London 2012	Succeeded by Dow Travers
