= Ronald Forbes (hurdler) =

Caymanian hurdler

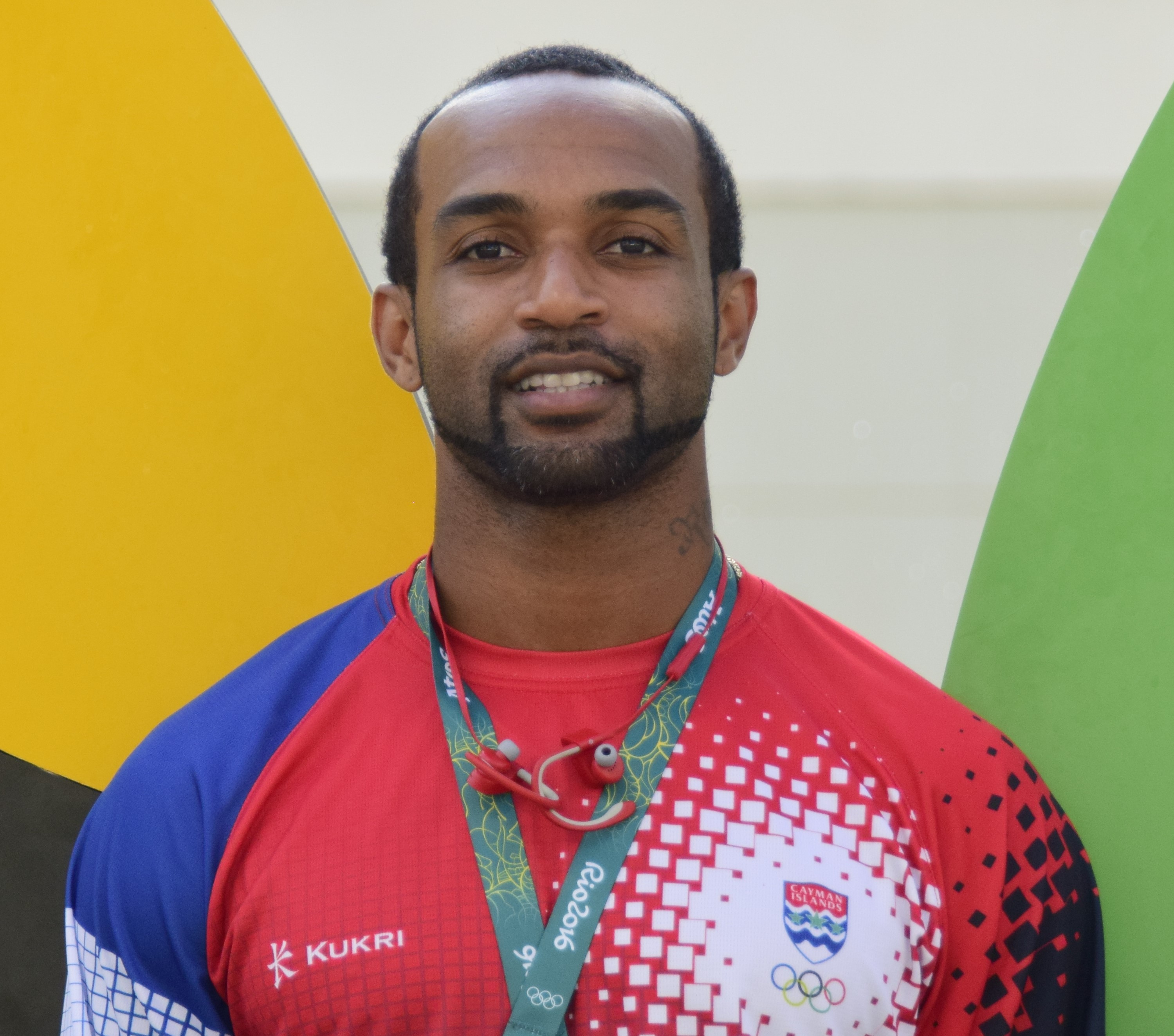

Personal information
- Born: Ronald Joseph Forbes; 5 April 1985 (age 41) George Town, Cayman Islands
- Height: 1.92 m (6 ft 4 in)
- Weight: 93 kg (205 lb)

Sport
- Country: Cayman Islands
- Sport: Athletics
- Event: 110-metre hurdles
- Coached by: Joey Scott (United States)

Achievements and titles
- Olympic finals: 2008 Beijing Olympics, 2012 London Olympics, 2016 Rio Olympics
- World finals: 2008 World Indoor Qualifier, 2009 World Outdoor Qualifier, 2010 World Indoor Qualifier, 2011 World Outdoor Semi-finalist, 2012 World Indoor Qualifier, 2015 World Outdoor Qualifier, 2016 World Indoor Qualifier.
- Highest world ranking: 15
- Personal best: 13.36 s 110 metre hurdles
Medal record
Athletics
Representing Cayman Islands
CAC Junior Championships (U20)
Bronze medal – third place	2004 Coatzacoalcos	400 m hurdles
CARIFTA Games Junior (U20)
Silver medal – second place	2004 Hamilton	400 m hurdles
Natwest Island Games
Gold medal – first place	2015 Jersey	110 m hurdles
- Updated on 21 December 2014

Ronald Joseph Forbes (born 5 April 1985) is a track athlete from the Cayman Islands.

Forbes is an All American 110 meter hurdler and 60 meter hurdler who competed collegiality for Florida International University from 2005 to 2008 . Forbes went on to pursue a professional track and field career competing in the 2008, 2012, and 2016 Summer Olympics. Forbes has competed in the 2011 and 2015 Athletics World Championships. Indoors, Forbes has qualified and competed 2010 and 2012 World Indoor Athletics Championships. Forbes has competed in the 2006, 2010, 2014, and 2018 Commonwealth Games. During the opening ceremonies for the 2008 and 2016 Summer Olympics he was the flag-bearer for the Cayman Islands.

He took up athletics when he was 14 as a discus thrower and shot putter, because he hoped it would give him the opportunity for travel and a scholarship. He eventually earned a scholarship in 2004 to Bacone College in Muskogee Oklahoma where he became the Red River Athletic Conference champion in the 400 meter hurdles and after a year, transferred to Florida International University. During his time at Florida International University, he was a two time All American, finishing 3rd in the 2008 NCAA Indoor Championships and 8th in the 2008 NCAA Outdoor Championships. He is currently the Cayman Islands National Record Holder and the Florida International University Record Holder in the 55, 60 and 110 meter hurdles. In 2017 he was awarded the honor of having the Football Stadium in his home district of North side renamed to The Ronald J Forbes Playing Field; in the same year he has been recognized as a National Sports hero in the Cayman Islands.

== Personal bests ==
=== Outdoor ===
- 200 m: 21.65 s (wind: +0.3 m/s) – Coral Gables, United States, 12 April 2008
- 110 m hurdles: 13.36 s (wind: +0.4 m/s) – Clermont, United States, 30 April 2016
- 400 m hurdles: 52.79 s – New Orleans, United States, 15 May 2005

=== Indoor ===
- 60 m hurdles: 7.58 s – Fayetteville, United States, 14 March 2008
- 200 m: 22.33 s – Gainesville, United States, 26 January 2008

== Achievements ==
Forbes is the Cayman Islands and Florida International University 110 metres hurdles (outdoor), 60 metres hurdles (indoor) and 55 metres hurdles (indoor) record holder.

Year	Competition	Venue	Position	Event	Notes
Representing the Cayman Islands
2000	CARIFTA Games (U17)	St. George's, Grenada	5th	100 m hurdles (91.4 cm)	13.64 (+1.8 m/s)
2000	Central American and Caribbean Junior; Championships (U17)	San Juan, Puerto Rico	7th	100 m hurdles (91.4 cm)	14.17 w (+4.0 m/s)
2000	Central American and Caribbean Junior; Championships (U17)	San Juan, Puerto Rico	6th	400 m hurdles (84.0 cm)	1:03.86
2001	CARIFTA Games (U17)	Bridgetown, Barbados	5th	100 m hurdles (91.4 cm)	13.73 (-2.3 m/s)
2001	CARIFTA Games (U17)	Bridgetown, Barbados	5th (h)	400 m hurdles	59.74
2001	Central American and Caribbean Championships	Guatemala City, Guatemala	7th	4 × 100 m relay	40.99 A
2002	CARIFTA Games (U20)	Nassau, Bahamas	5th	400 m hurdles	54.61
2002	CARIFTA Games (U20)	Nassau, Bahamas	5th	4 × 400 m relay	3:26.78
2002	Central American and Caribbean Junior; Championships (U20)	Bridgetown, Barbados	6th (h)	400 m hurdles	55.51
2002	Central American and Caribbean Games	San Salvador, El Salvador	7th	400 m hurdles	55.01
2003	CARIFTA Games (U20)	Port of Spain, Trinidad and Tobago	5th	400 m hurdles	54.39
2003	CARIFTA Games (U20)	Port of Spain, Trinidad and Tobago	6th	4 × 100 m relay	42.07
2003	CARIFTA Games (U20)	Port of Spain, Trinidad and Tobago	6th	4 × 400 m relay	3:28.35
2003	Island Games	Saint Peter Port, Guernsey	4th	400 m hurdles	53.98
2004	CARIFTA Games (U20)	Port of Spain, Trinidad and Tobago	2nd	400 m hurdles	53.63
2004	CARIFTA Games (U20)	Port of Spain, Trinidad and Tobago	4th	4 × 100 m relay	42.95
2004	CARIFTA Games (U20)	Port of Spain, Trinidad and Tobago	5th	4 × 400 m relay	3:31.89
2004	Central American and Caribbean Junior; Championships (U20)	Coatzacoalcos, Mexico	3rd	400 m hurdles	53.80
2004	Central American and Caribbean Junior; Championships (U20)	Coatzacoalcos, Mexico	5th	4 × 100 m relay	42.71
2005	Central American and Caribbean Championships	Nassau, Bahamas	11th (h)	110 m hurdles	14.49 (-0.7 m/s)
2005	Central American and Caribbean Championships	Nassau, Bahamas	—	400 m hurdles	DNF
2006	Commonwealth Games	Melbourne, Australia	16th (h)	110 m hurdles	14.35 (NWI)
2006	Commonwealth Games	Melbourne, Australia	12th (h)	4 × 100 m relay	40.76
2006	NACAC Under-23 Championships	Santo Domingo, Dominican Republic	6th	110 m hurdles	14.44 (+1.1 m/s)
2006	Central American and Caribbean Games	Cartagena, Colombia	10th (h)	110 m hurdles	14.42 w (+2.1 m/s)
2008	Central American and Caribbean Championships	Cali, Colombia	5th	110 m hurdles	13.71 w A (+2.3 m/s)
2008	Olympic Games	Beijing, China	26th (qf)	110 m hurdles	13.72 (+0.1 m/s)
2010	World Indoor Championships	Doha, Qatar	20th (sf)	60m hurdles	7.91
2010	Central American and Caribbean Games	Mayagüez, Puerto Rico	7th	110 m hurdles	14.34 (-0.1 m/s)
2010	Commonwealth Games	Delhi, India	6th	110 m hurdles	13.84 (+0.1 m/s)
2010	Commonwealth Games	Delhi, India	—	4 × 100 m relay	DQ
2011	Central American and Caribbean Championships	Mayagüez, Puerto Rico	9th (h)	110 m hurdles	14.18 (-3.9 m/s)
2011	World Championships	Daegu, South Korea	11th (sf)	110 m hurdles	13.67 (-1.6 m/s)
2012	World Indoor Championships	Istanbul, Turkey	21st (h)	60m hurdles	7.95
2012	Olympic Games	London, United Kingdom	8th (h)	110 m hurdles	14.21 (+0.8 m/s)
2014	Commonwealth Games	Glasgow, United Kingdom	5th (h)	110 m hurdles	13.89 (-0.2 m/s)
2014	Central American and Caribbean Games	Xalapa, Mexico	5th (h)	110 m hurdles	14.51 A (-1.6 m/s)
2015	NACAC Championships	San José, Costa Rica	6th (sf)	110 m hurdles	13.77 (+1.2 m/s)
2015	Island Games	St Clement, Jersey	1st	110 m hurdles	13.62 (+2.3 m/s)
2015	World Championships	Beijing, China	30th (h)	110 m hurdles	13.78
2016	Olympic Games	Rio de Janeiro, Brazil	35th (h)	110 m hurdles	14.67
2018	Commonwealth Games	Gold Coast, Australia	11th (h)	110 m hurdles	13.88

Olympic Games
Preceded by Cydonie Mothersill	Flagbearer for Cayman Islands; Beijing 2008	Succeeded by Dow Travers
Olympic Games
Preceded by Dow Travers	Flagbearer for Cayman Islands; Rio 2016	Succeeded by Jillian Crooks; Brett Fraser
