= Cayman Islands Athletic Association =

Governing body for athletics in the Cayman Islands

- Sport: Athletics
- Jurisdiction: Association
- Abbreviation: CIAA
- Founded: 1980
- Affiliation: IAAF
- Affiliation date: 1981
- Regional affiliation: NACAC
- Headquarters: George Town
- President: H. Delroy Murray
- Secretary: Cydonie Mothersill
- Replaced: Cayman Islands Amateur Athletic Association

Official website
- athletics.org.ky
- (Cayman Islands)

The Cayman Islands Athletic Association (CIAA) is the governing body for the sport of athletics in the Cayman Islands. Current president is H. Delroy Murray.

== History ==
CIAA was founded in 1980 as Cayman Islands Amateur Athletic Association and was affiliated to the IAAF in 1981.

== Affiliations ==
CIAA is the national member federation for the Cayman Islands in the following international organisations:

- International Association of Athletics Federations (IAAF)
- North American, Central American and Caribbean Athletic Association (NACAC)
- Association of Panamerican Athletics (APA)
- Central American and Caribbean Athletic Confederation (CACAC)

Moreover, it is part of the following national organisations:

- Cayman Islands Olympic Committee (CIOC)

== National records ==
CIAA maintains the Cayman Islands records in athletics.
