= Gangneung HIGH1 ARENA =

Sports venue in Gangneung, South Korea

Gangneung Stadium
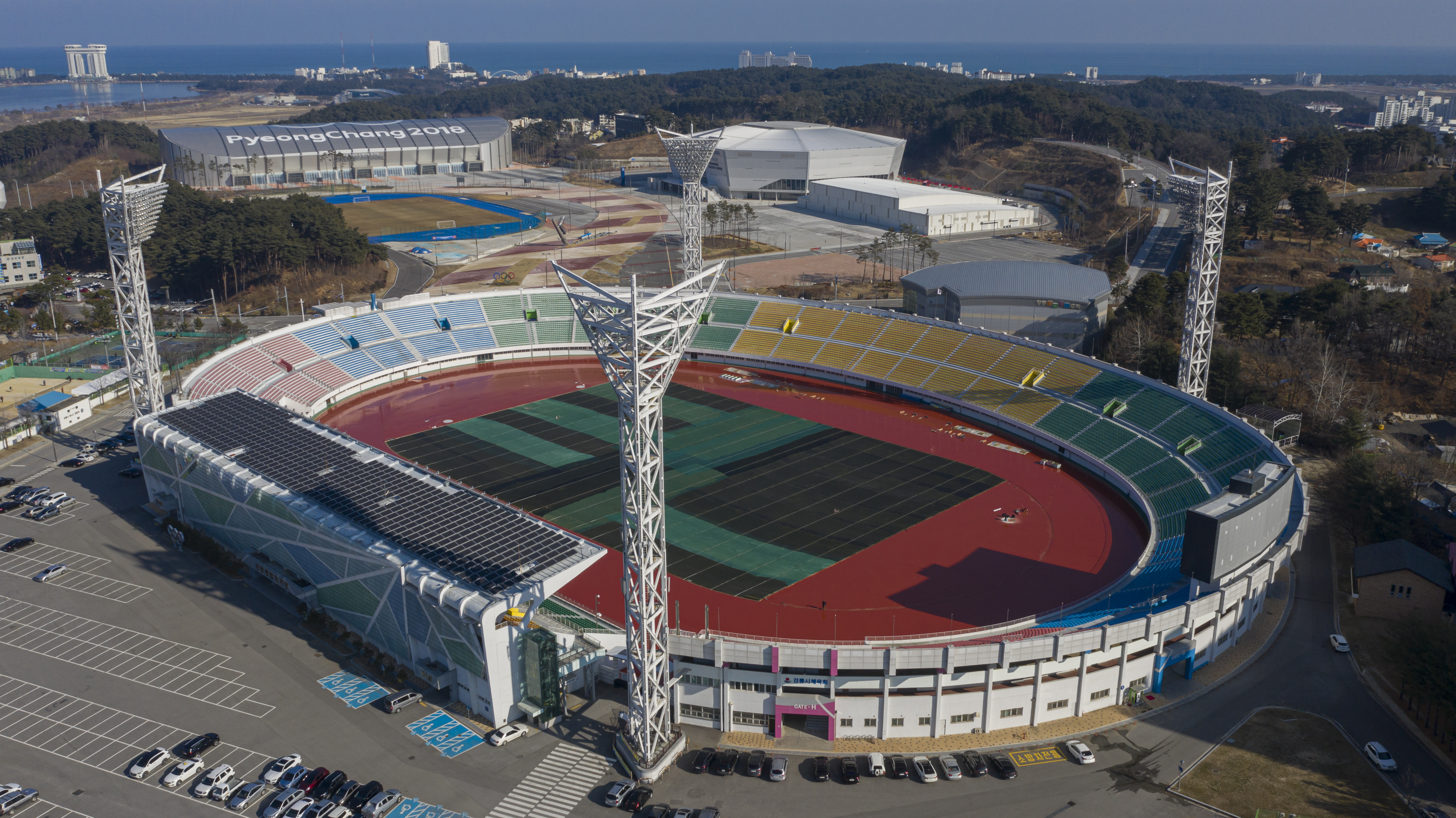
- Interactive map of Gangneung Stadium
- Location: 408-3, Gyo-dong, Gangneung, Gangwon-do, South Korea
- Coordinates: 37.77366°N 128.897503°E
- Owner: City of Gangneung
- Operator: City of Gangneung
- Capacity: 22,333
- Surface: Natural grass

Construction
- Groundbreaking: January 28, 1981
- Opened: June 18, 1984

Tenants
- Hyundai Horangi (1987–1989); FC Gangneung (1999–present); Gangwon FC (2009–present)

The Gangneung Stadium (강릉하이원아레나, Gangneung HIGH1 ARENA) is a multi-purpose stadium in Gangneung, South Korea. It is currently used mostly for football (American English: soccer) matches. The stadium has a capacity of 22,333 spectators and was opened in 1984. It is the home ground of FC Gangneung and Gangwon FC (since 2009).

It is located within the Gangneung Olympic Park, one of the main sites of the 2018 Winter Olympics.

The ski resort High1 owns the naming rights to the stadium as of 2025.
