= Olympic Park =

Sports campus where the Olympic Games are held

An Olympic Park is a sports campus for hosting the Olympic Games. Typically it contains the Olympic Stadium and the International Broadcast Centre. It may also contain the Olympic Village or some of the other sports venues, such as the aquatics complex in the case of the summer games, or the main ice hockey rink for the winter games. The Olympic Park is often part of the "legacy" which provides benefit to the host city after the games have ended. As such it may subsequently include an urban park and a museum or similar commemoration of the games that were hosted there.

The 1908 Olympic organising committee specified "As far as possible all the competitions, including swimming, archery, fencing, wrestling, etc., will be held on the same site in which the amphitheatre for the track-athletics and cycling will be erected." Not every games has a centralised complex of this type. The 1992 and 2010 Winter Games had widely dispersed venues; "Whistler Olympic Park" was the venue for the Nordic skiing events in 2010. Venues of the 2016 Summer Olympics in Rio de Janeiro were split among four "clusters" rather than concentrated in a single Park.

== List ==
Olympics	City	Park	Notes
1896 Summer	Athens	National Garden, Athens	Also used for the 1906 Intercalated games
1900 Summer	Paris	Bois de Vincennes	
1904 Summer	St. Louis	Louisiana Purchase Exposition fairgrounds	Also the site of the concurrent Louisiana Purchase Exposition. Site return for use as classrooms and administrative office for Washington University in St. Louis.
1906 Intercalated Games	Athens	National Gardens of Athens	Also used for the 1896 Summer Olympics
1908 Summer	London	White City	Also the site of the concurrent Franco-British Exhibition
1928 Summer	Amsterdam	Olympic Sportspark	
1932 Winter	Lake Placid	Olympic Center	Also used for the 1980 Winter Olympics
1932 Summer	Los Angeles	Exposition Park	Also used for the 1984 Summer Olympics. Remains in use today as a public park.
1936 Summer	Berlin	Olympiapark Berlin	
1948 Summer	London	Wembley Empire Exhibition Grounds	Part of the grounds used for 1923 Wembley Stadium and the current 2007 Wembley Stadium.
1952 Winter	Oslo	Holmenkollen National Arena	
1952 Summer	Helsinki	Eläintarha	
1956 Summer	Melbourne	Melbourne Sports and Entertainment Precinct	The Olympic Park Stadium within the precinct was so named in 1934.
1960 Winter	Squaw Valley	Squaw Valley Ski Resort	All venues of these games, except McKinney Creek Stadium, were laid out within walking distance of each other.
1960 Summer	Rome	Foro Italico	
1964 Winter	Innsbruck	OlympiaWorld Innsbruck	Also used for the 1976 Winter and the 2012 Winter Youth Olympics.
1964 Summer	Tokyo	Komazawa Olympic Park and Yoyogi Park	
1968 Summer	Mexico City	Chapultepec, Ciudad Universitaria and Magdalena Mixhuca Sports City	
1972 Winter	Sapporo	Makomanai Park	
1972 Summer	Munich	Olympiapark	
1976 Winter	Innsbruck	OlympiaWorld Innsbruck	Also used in the 1964 Winter and 2012 Winter Youth Olympics
1976 Summer	Montreal	Olympic Park	
1980 Winter	Lake Placid	Olympic Center and Lake Placid Olympic Sports Complex	Also used for the 1932 Winter Olympics
1980 Summer	Moscow	CSKA Moscow, Dynamo Stadium, Krylatskoye Sports Complex, Luzhniki Olympic Complex and Olympiysky Sports Complex	
1984 Summer	Los Angeles	Exposition Park	Also used for the 1932 Summer Olympics
1984 Winter	Sarajevo	Olympic Village, Mojmilo, Koševo Stadium, Zetra Ice Hall, Zetra Ice Rink, Skenderija II Hall	
1988 Winter	Calgary	Canada Olympic Park, Stampede Grounds and University of Calgary	
1988 Summer	Seoul	Olympic Park and Seoul Sports Complex	
1992 Summer	Barcelona	Anella Olímpica	
1994 Winter	Lillehammer	Stampesletta	Also used for the 2016 Winter Youth Olympics
1996 Summer	Atlanta	Centennial Olympic Park	Differs from other Olympic parks. Rather than being a complex hosting sports venues used for the games, it was instead a public gathering site constructed for the games, and was not home to any Olympic competition venues.
2000 Summer	Sydney	Sydney Olympic Park	
2002 Winter	Salt Lake City	Utah Olympic Park	
2004 Summer	Athens	Athens Olympic Sports Complex, Faliro Coastal Zone Olympic Complex, Goudi Olympic Complex and Hellinikon Olympic Complex	
2006 Winter	Turin	Torino Olympic Park	
2008 Summer	Beijing	Olympic Green	Also to be used for the 2022 Winter Olympics
2010 Winter	Vancouver	Whistler Olympic Park	
2010 Summer (Youth)	Singapore	Bishan Sports Complex, Kallang Sport Complex, and Toa Payoh Sports & Recreation Centre	
2012 Winter (Youth)	Innsbruck	OlympiaWorld Innsbruck	Also used for the 1964 and 1976 Winter Olympics
2012 Summer	London	Queen Elizabeth Olympic Park	
2014 Winter	Sochi	Sochi Olympic Park	
2014 Summer (Youth)	Nanjing	Nanjing Olympic Sports Center	
2016 Winter (Youth)	Lillehammer	Stampesletta	Also used for the 1994 Winter Olympics
2016 Summer	Rio de Janeiro	Barra Olympic Park and Deodoro Olympic Park	
2018 Winter	Pyeongchang	Gangneung Olympic Park and Alpensia Sports Park	
2018 Summer (Youth)	Buenos Aires	Parque Olímpico de la Juventud	
2022 Winter	Beijing	Olympic Green	Also used for the 2008 Summer Olympics
2024 Winter (Youth)	Pyeongchang	Gangneung Olympic Park and Alpensia Sports Park	
2028 Summer	Los Angeles	Downtown Los Angeles Sports Park (Exposition Park, L.A. Live), South Bay Sports Park and Long Beach Sports Park	The Downtown Los Angeles Sports Park includes Exposition Park (also used for 1932 and 1984 games)

== Gallery ==
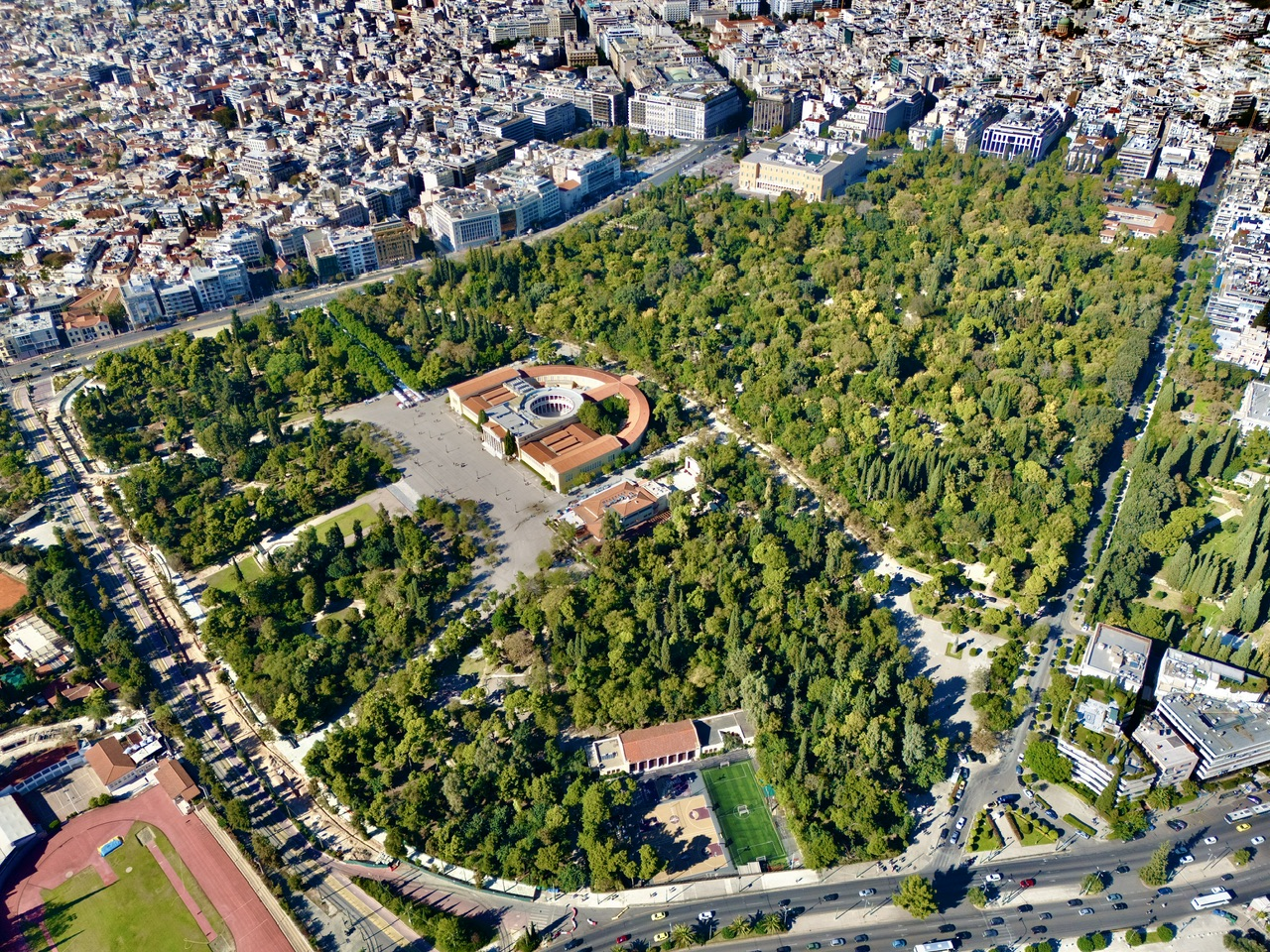
National Gardens served as the Olympic Park for the 1896 Summer Olympics in Athens.

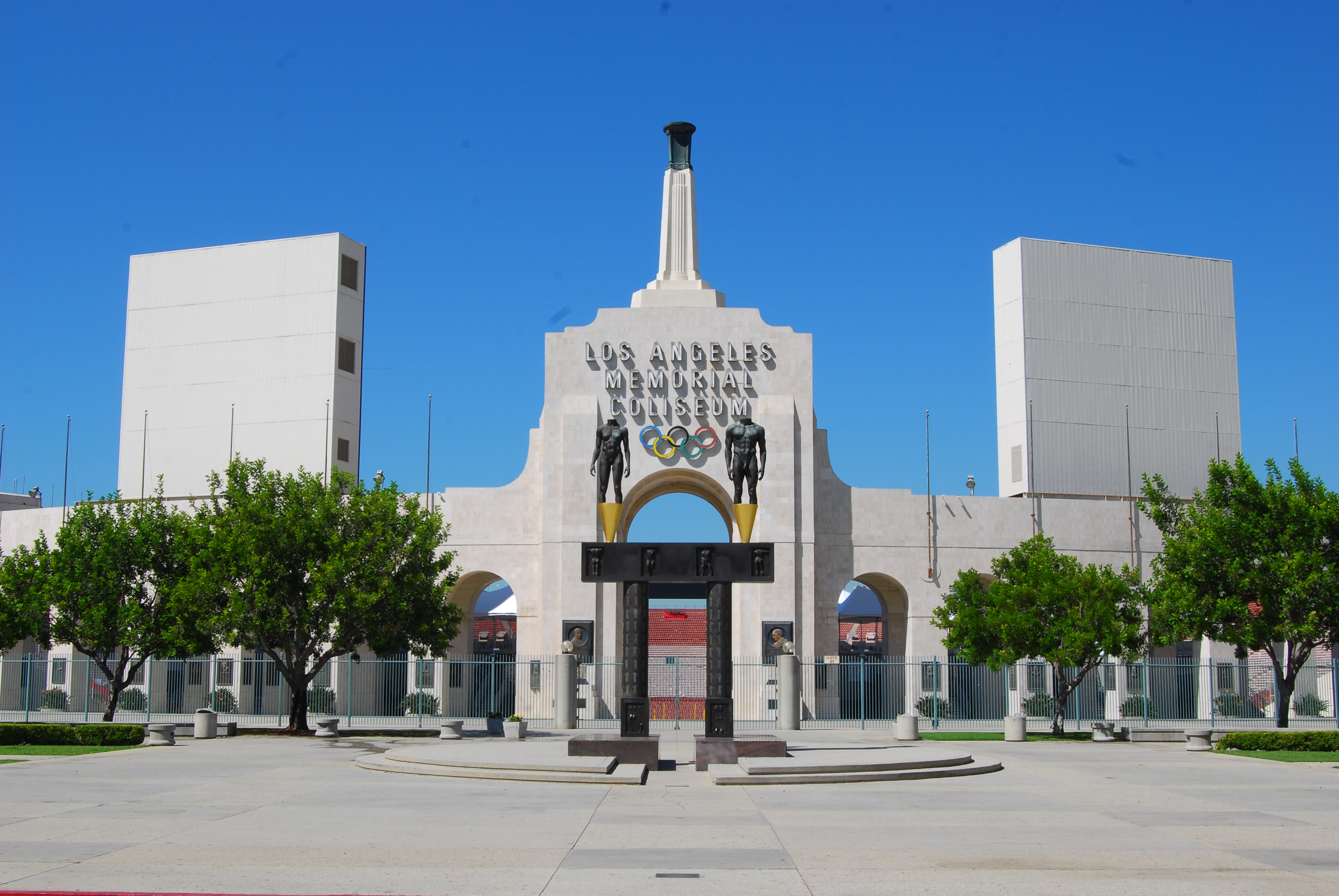
Exposition Park served as the Olympic Park for the 1932 and 1984 Summer Olympics. It will be the first three-time Olympic Park when Los Angeles hosts the 2028 Summer Olympics.

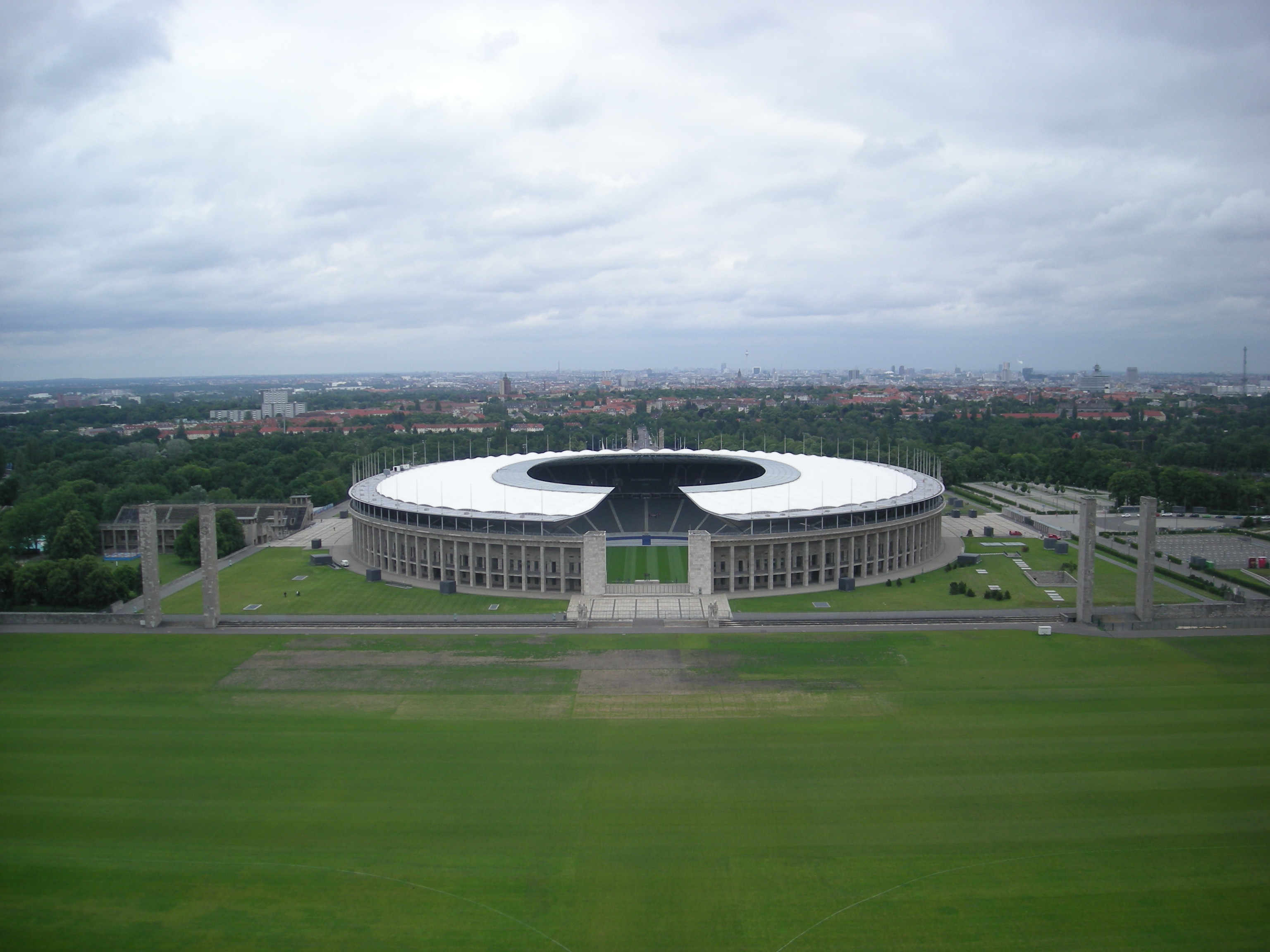
Olympiapark Berlin was developed for the 1936 Summer Olympics.

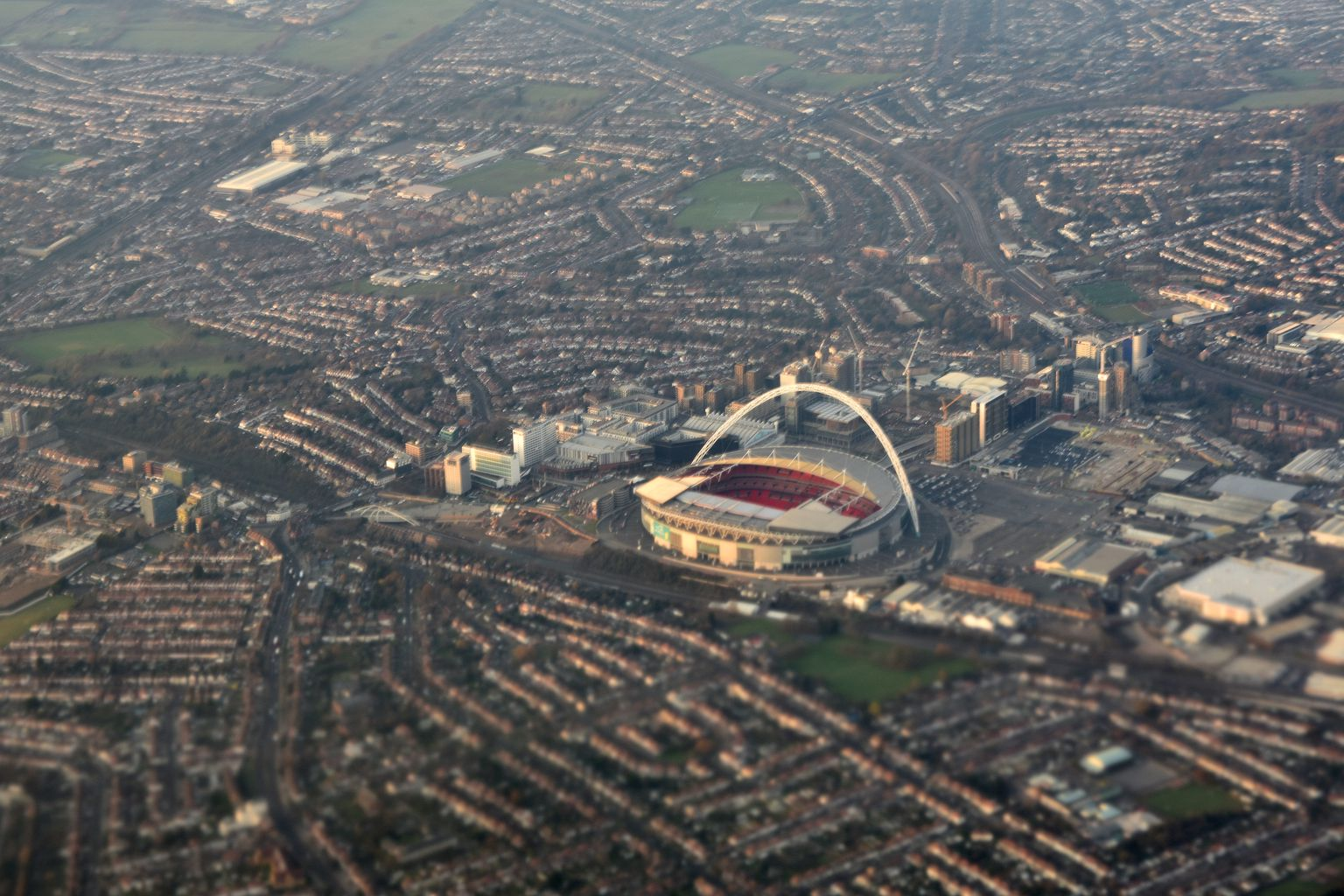
Wembley Empire Exhibition Grounds served as the Olympic Park for the 1948 Summer Olympics in London.

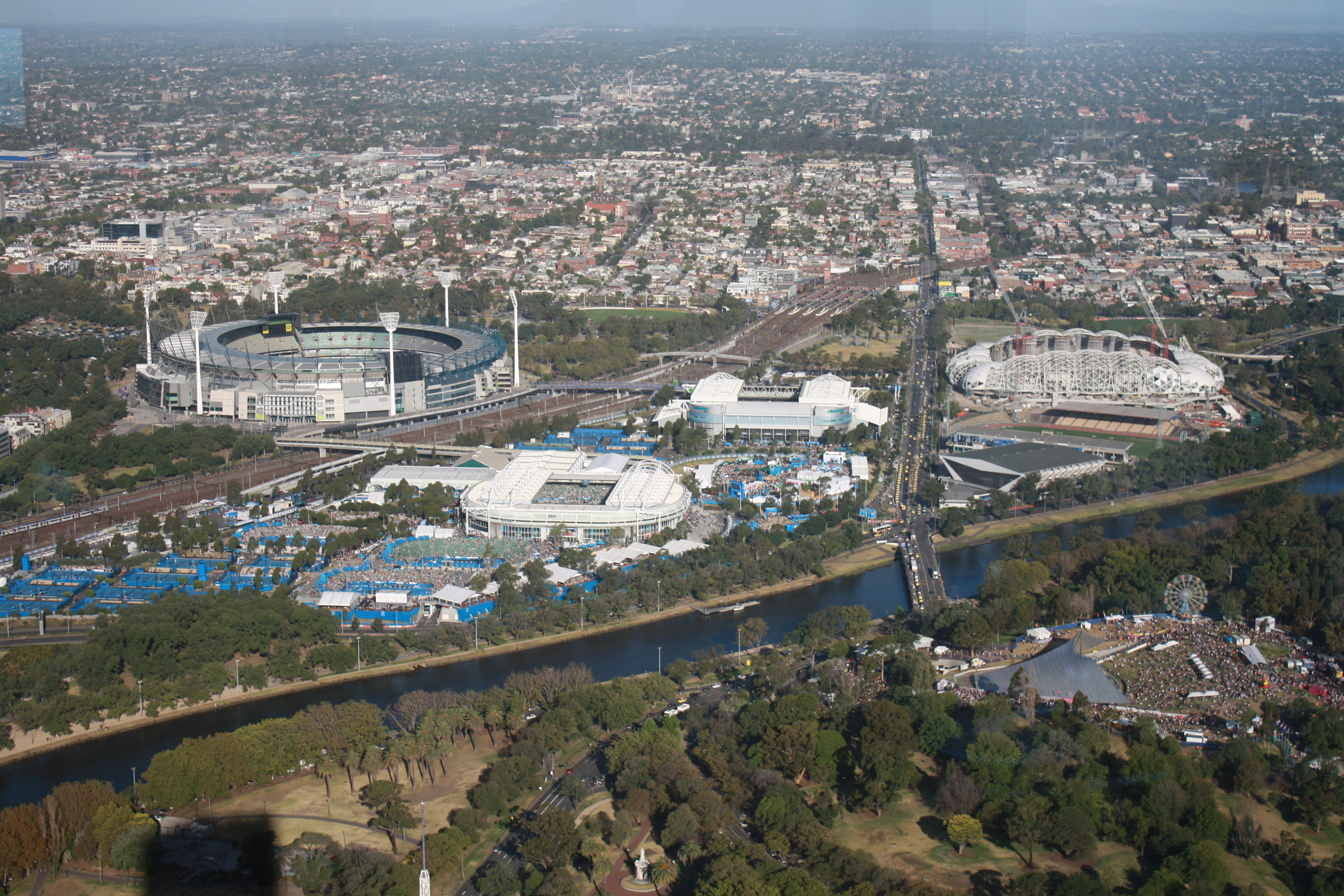
The Melbourne Sports and Entertainment Precinct was built for the 1956 Summer Olympics.

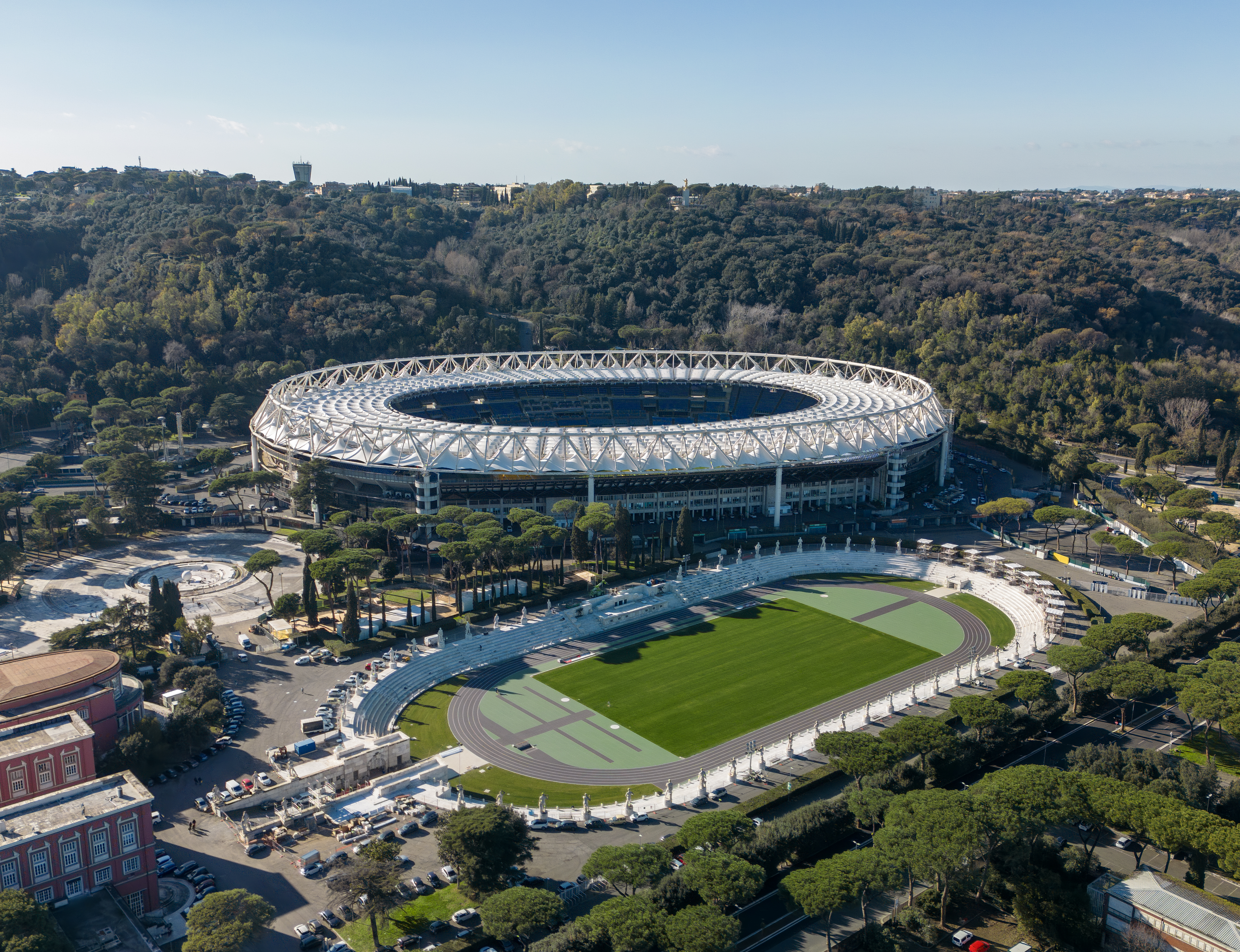
Forco Italico served as the Olympic Park for the 1960 Summer Olympics in Rome.

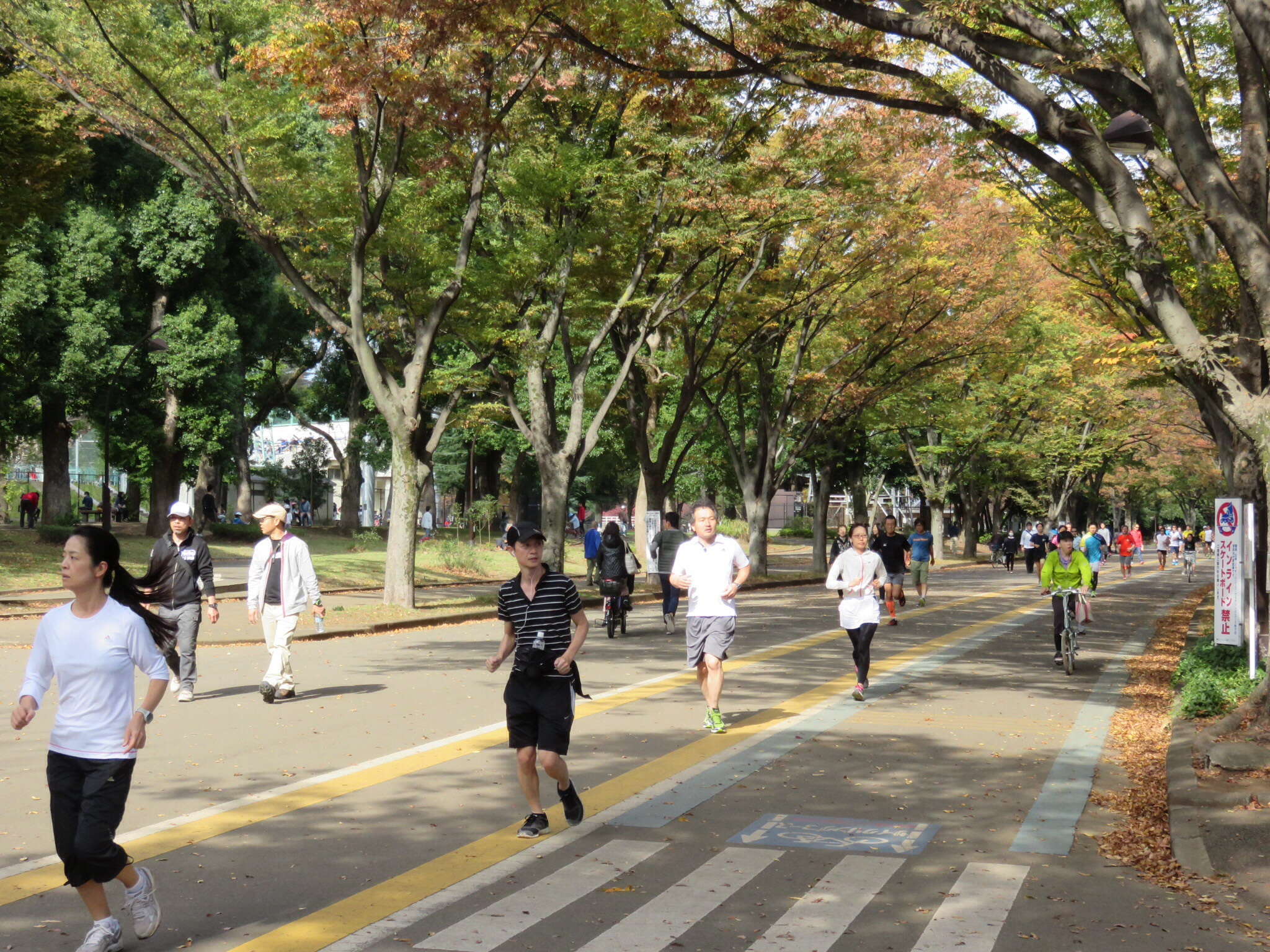
Komazawa Olympic Park was developed for the 1964 Summer Olympics in Tokyo.

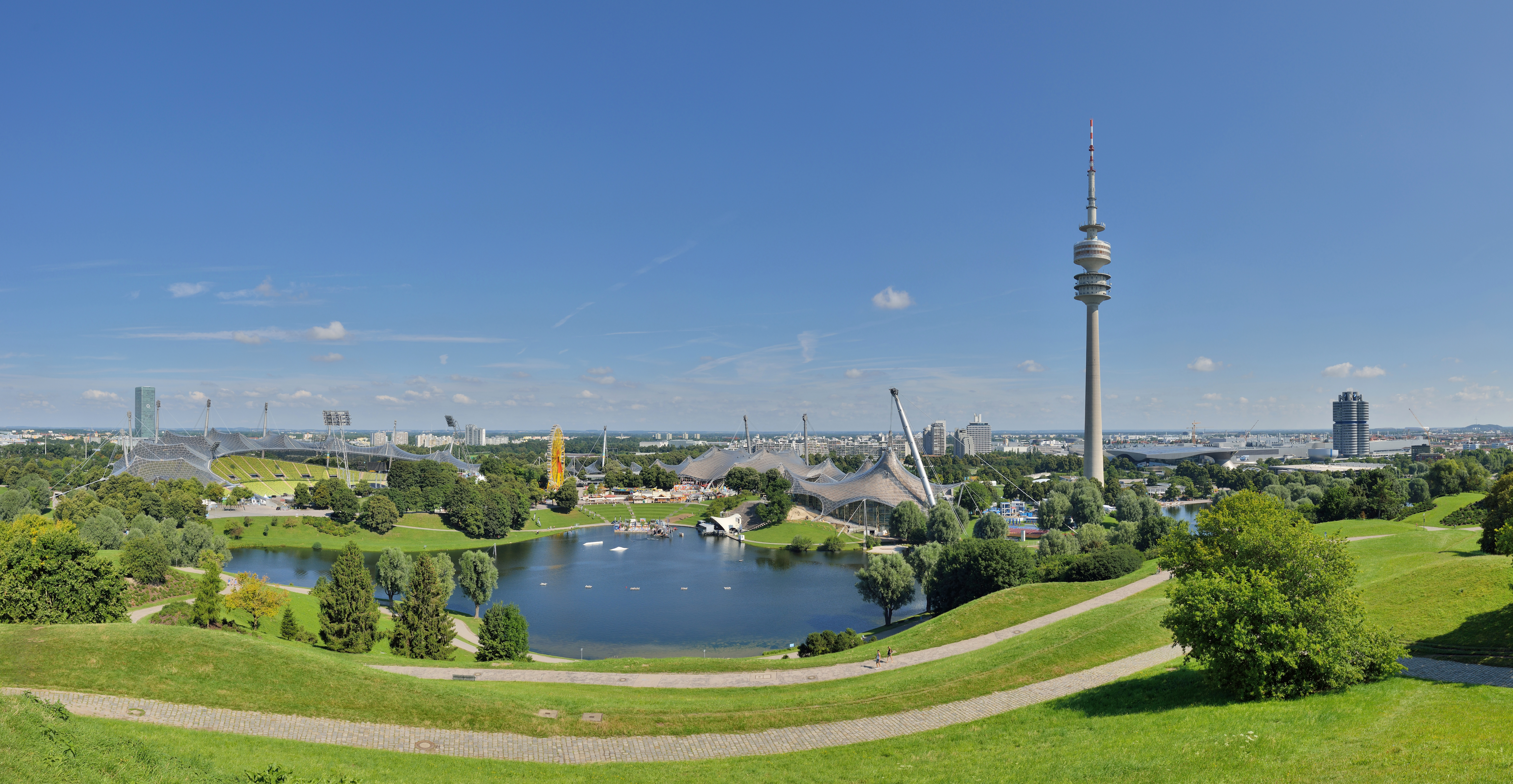
Olympiapark was developed for the 1972 Summer Olympics in Munich.

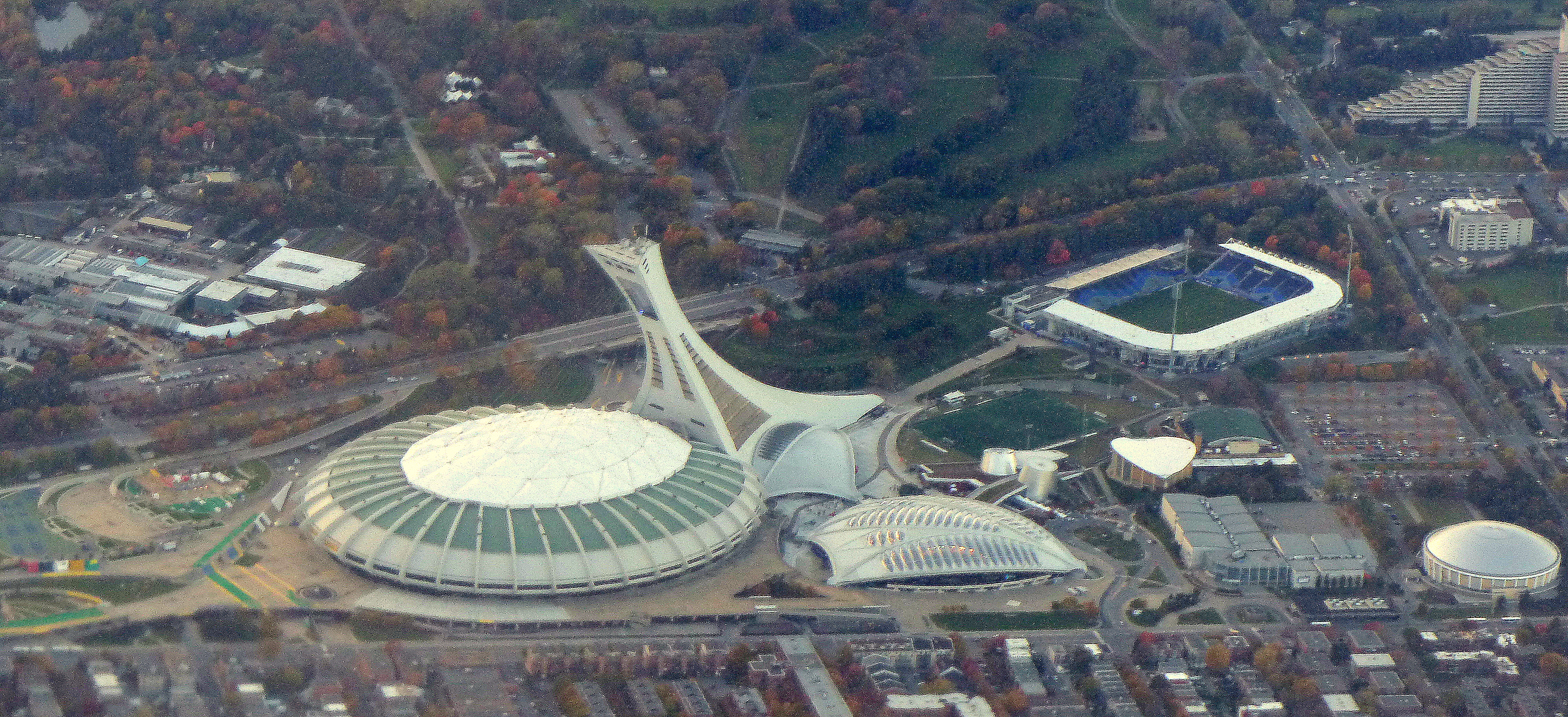
The Montreal Olympic Park was built for the 1976 Summer Olympics.

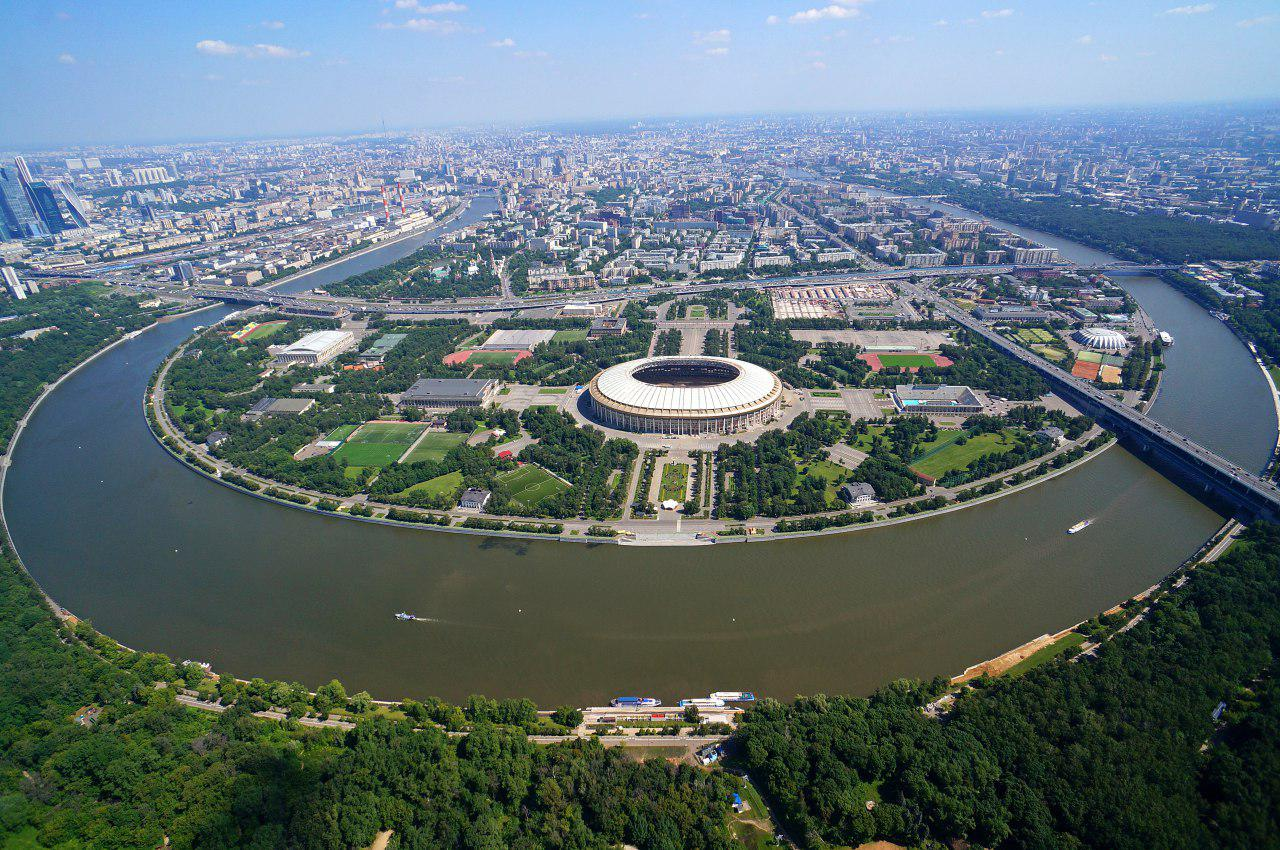
The Luzhniki Olympic Complex served as an Olympic Park for the 1980 Summer Olympics in Moscow.

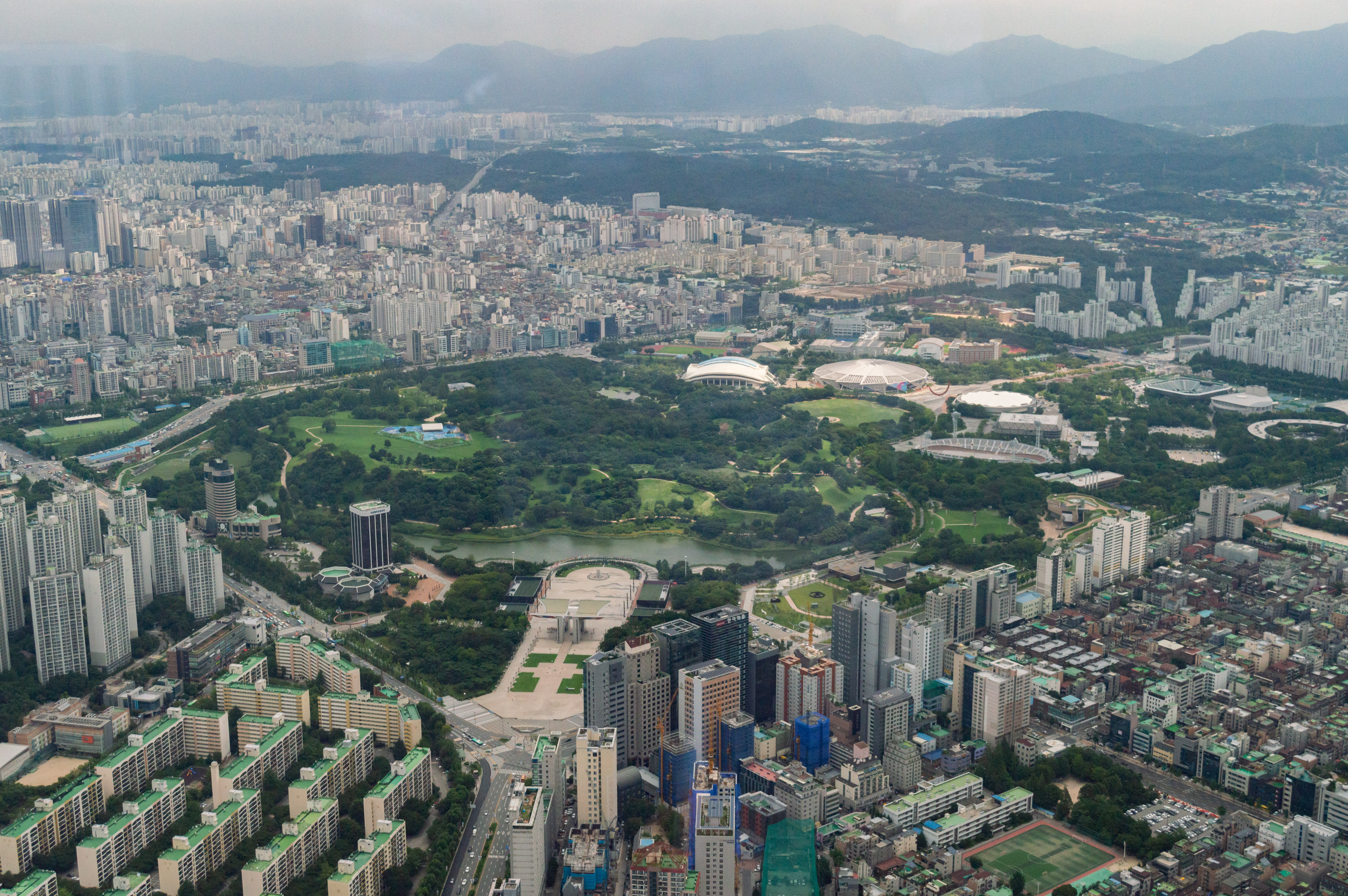
The Olympic Park was built for the 1988 Summer Olympics in Seoul.

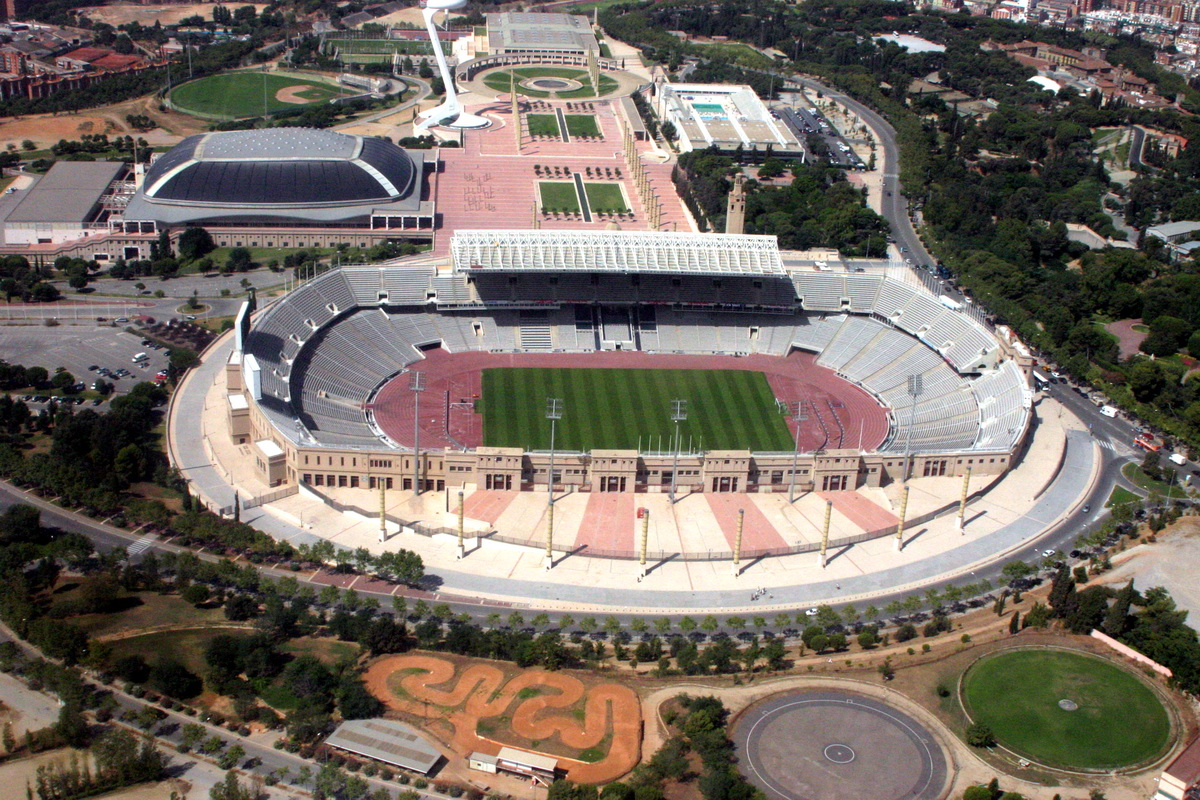
The Anella Olímpica was built for the 1992 Summer Olympics in Barcelona.

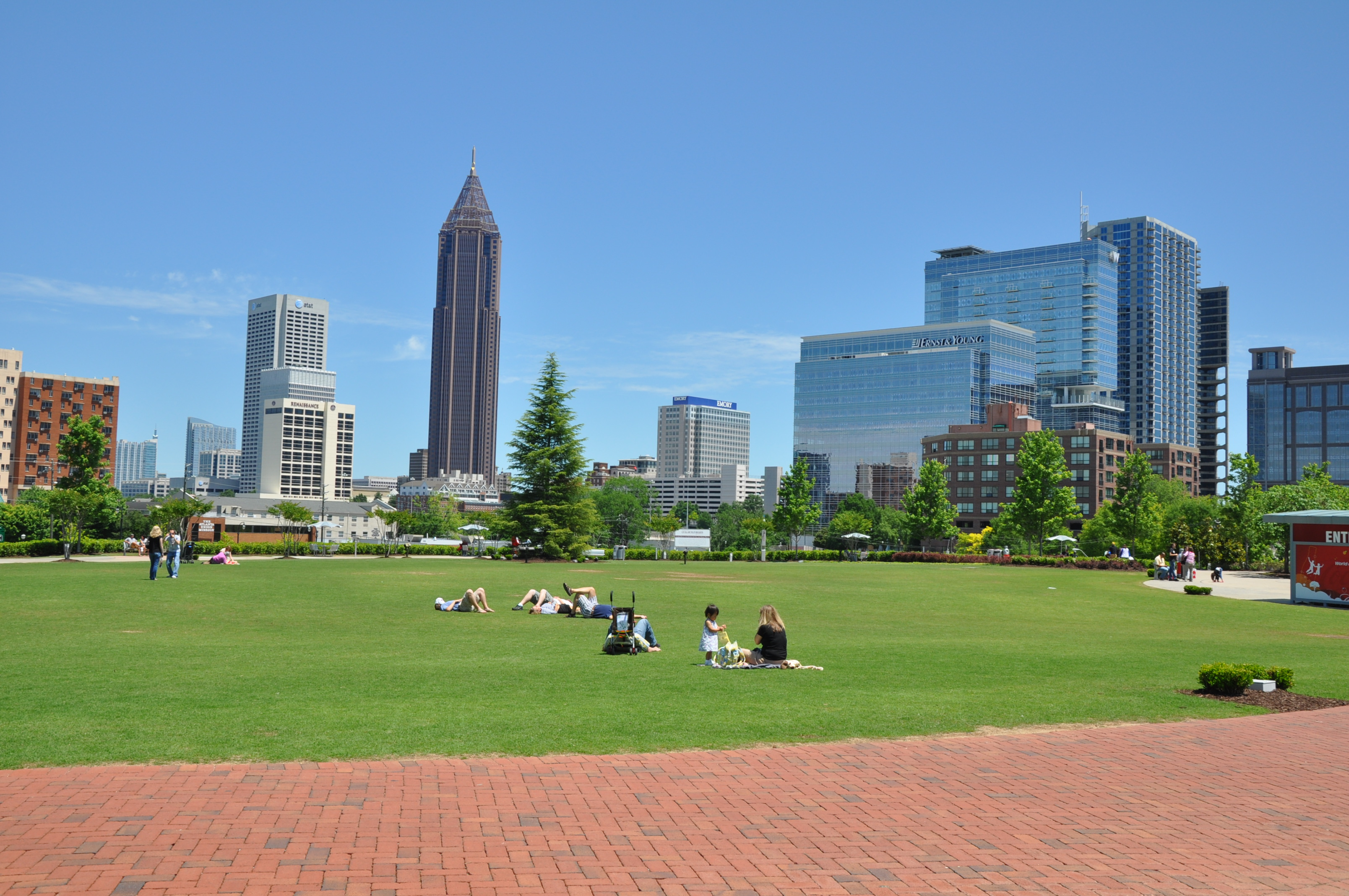
The Centennial Olympic Park was built for the 1996 Summer Olympics in Atlanta.

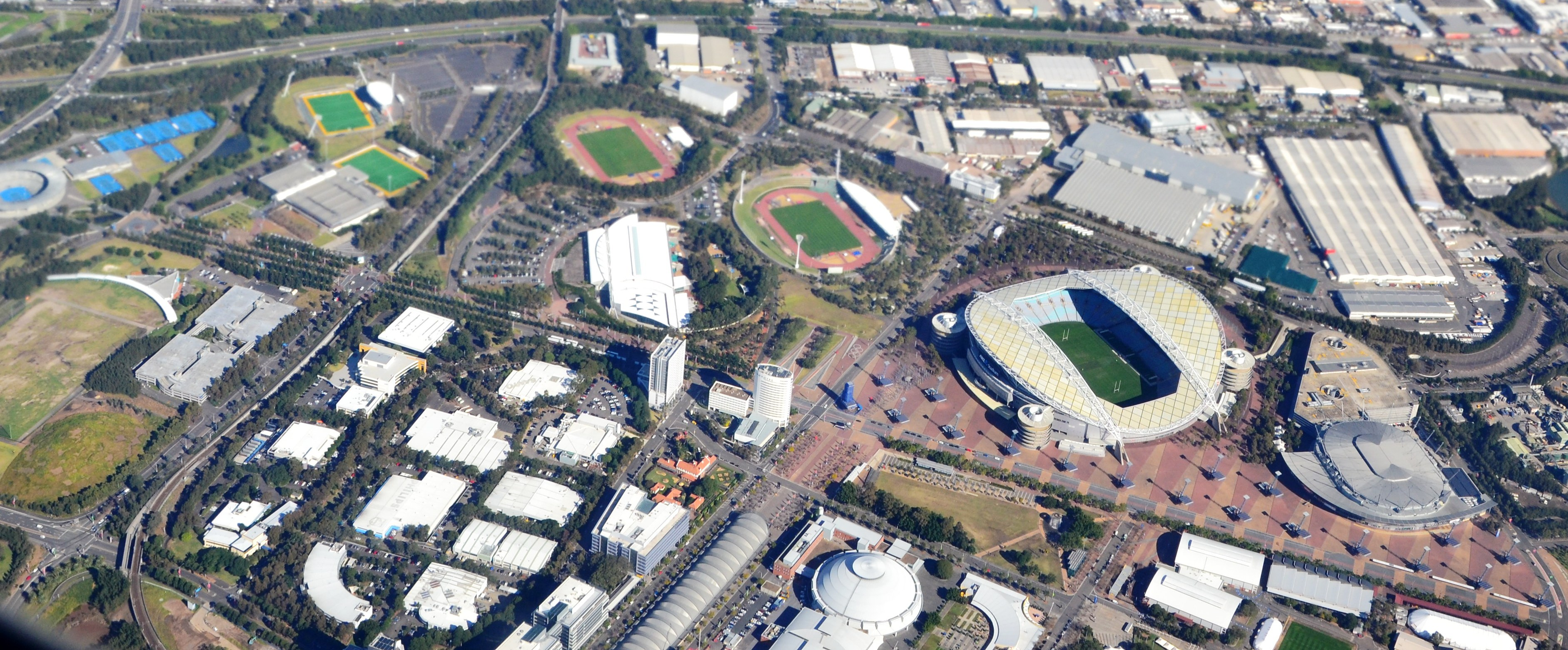
The Sydney Olympic Park was built for the 2000 Summer Olympics.

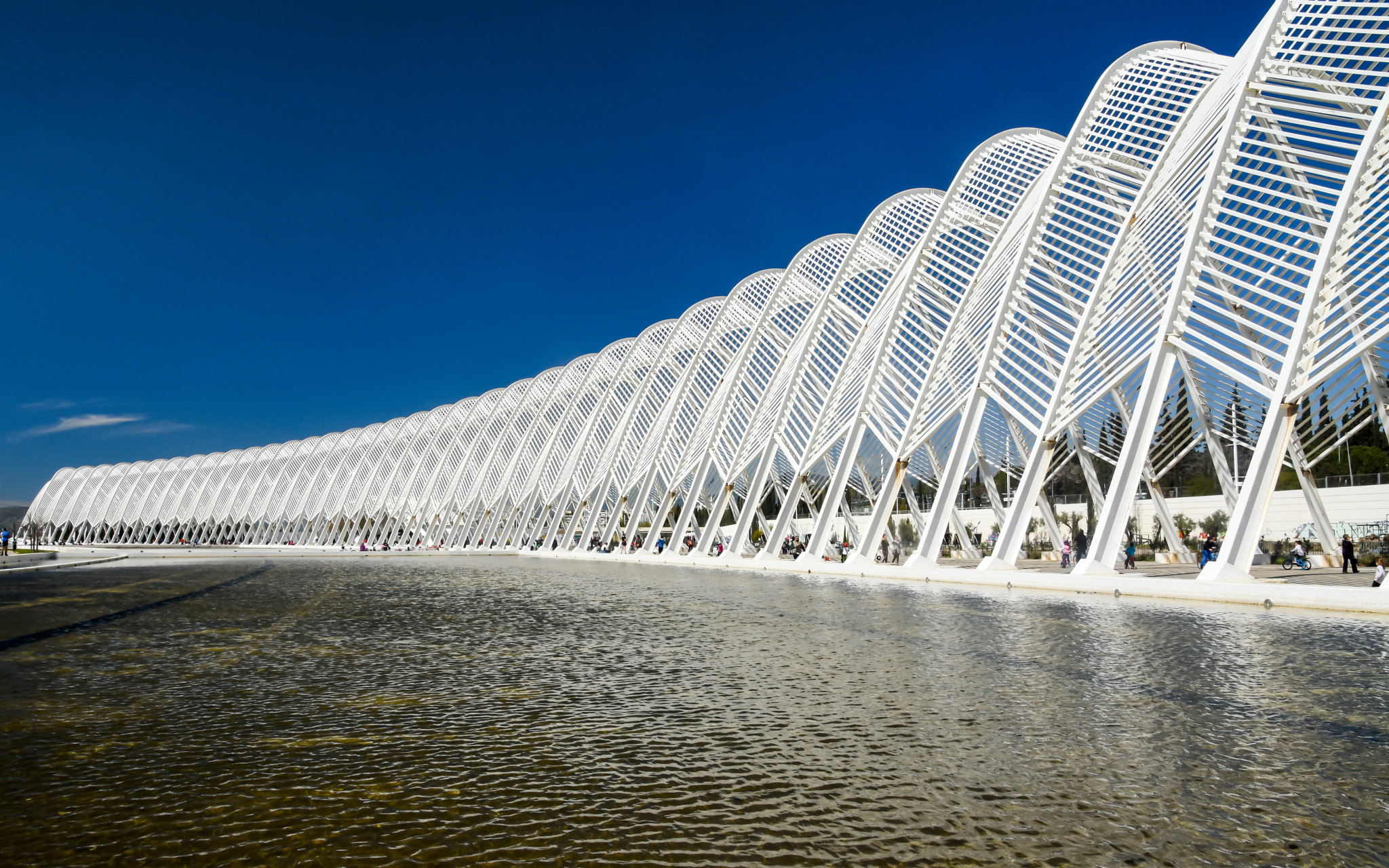
The Athens Olympic Sports Complex was built for the 2004 Summer Olympics.

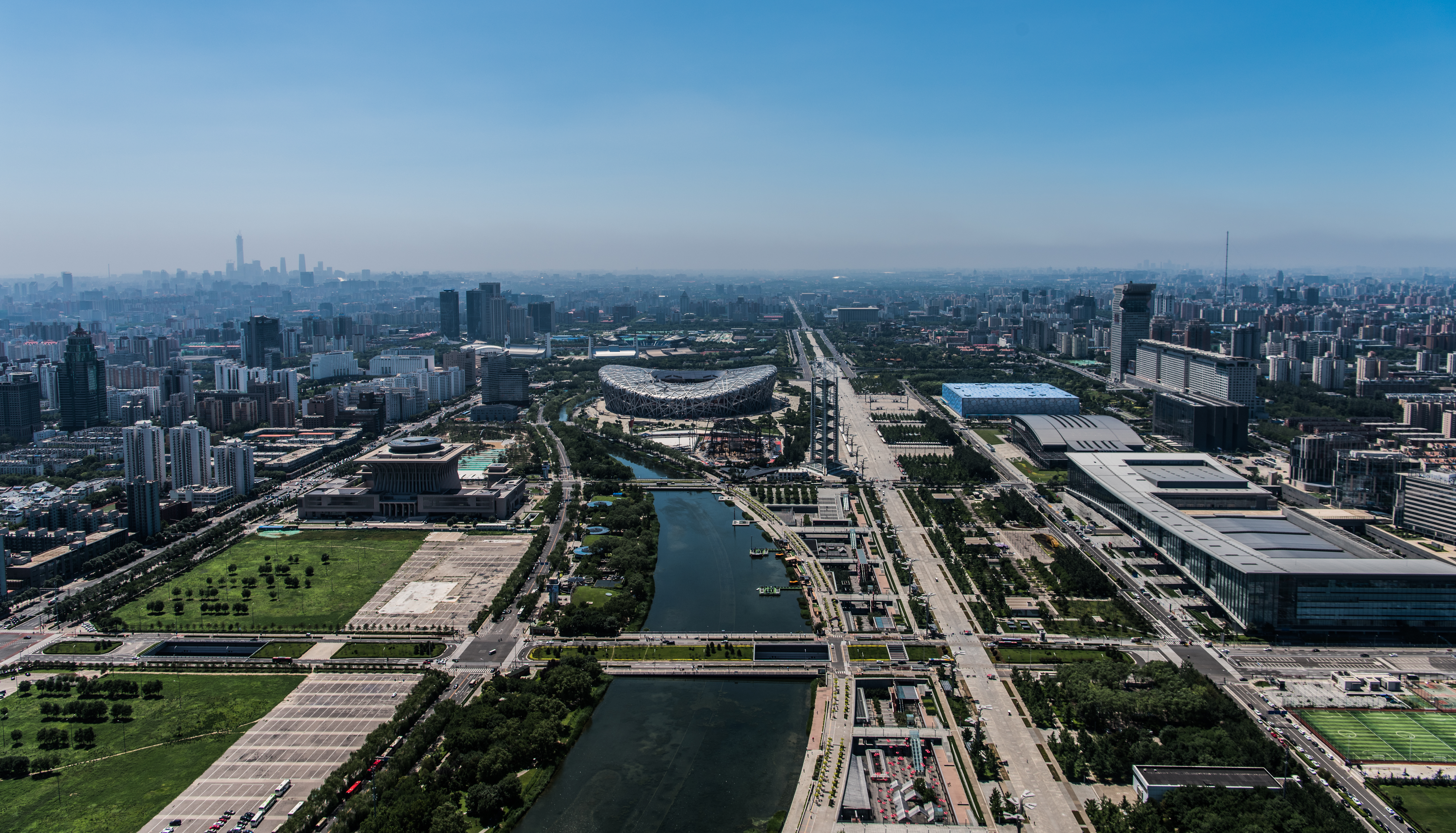
The Olympic Green was built for the 2008 Summer Olympics in Beijing. It served as the Olympic park for a second time when Beijing hosted the 2022 Winter Olympics.

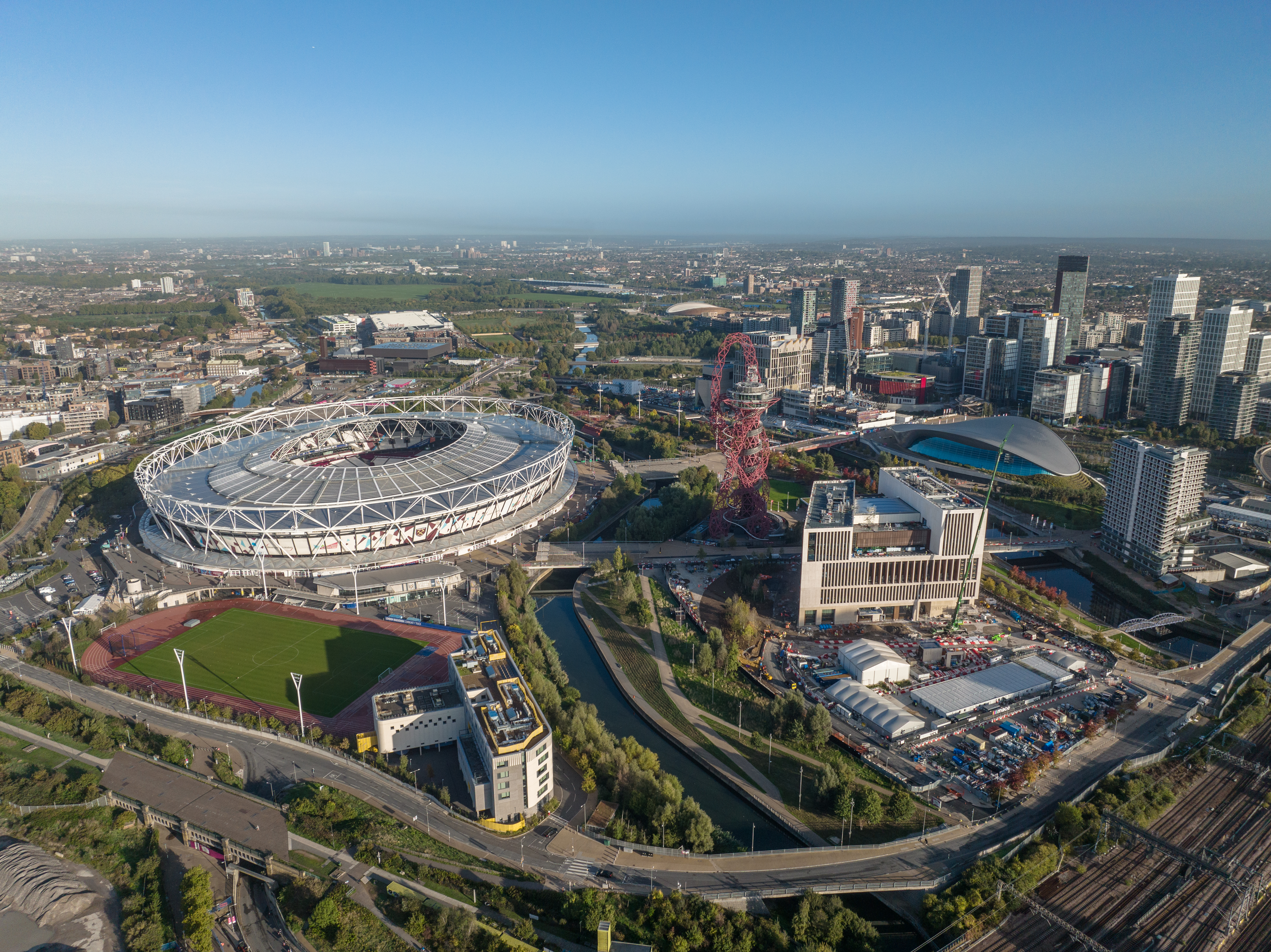
The Queen Elizabeth Olympic Park was built for the 2012 Summer Olympics in London.

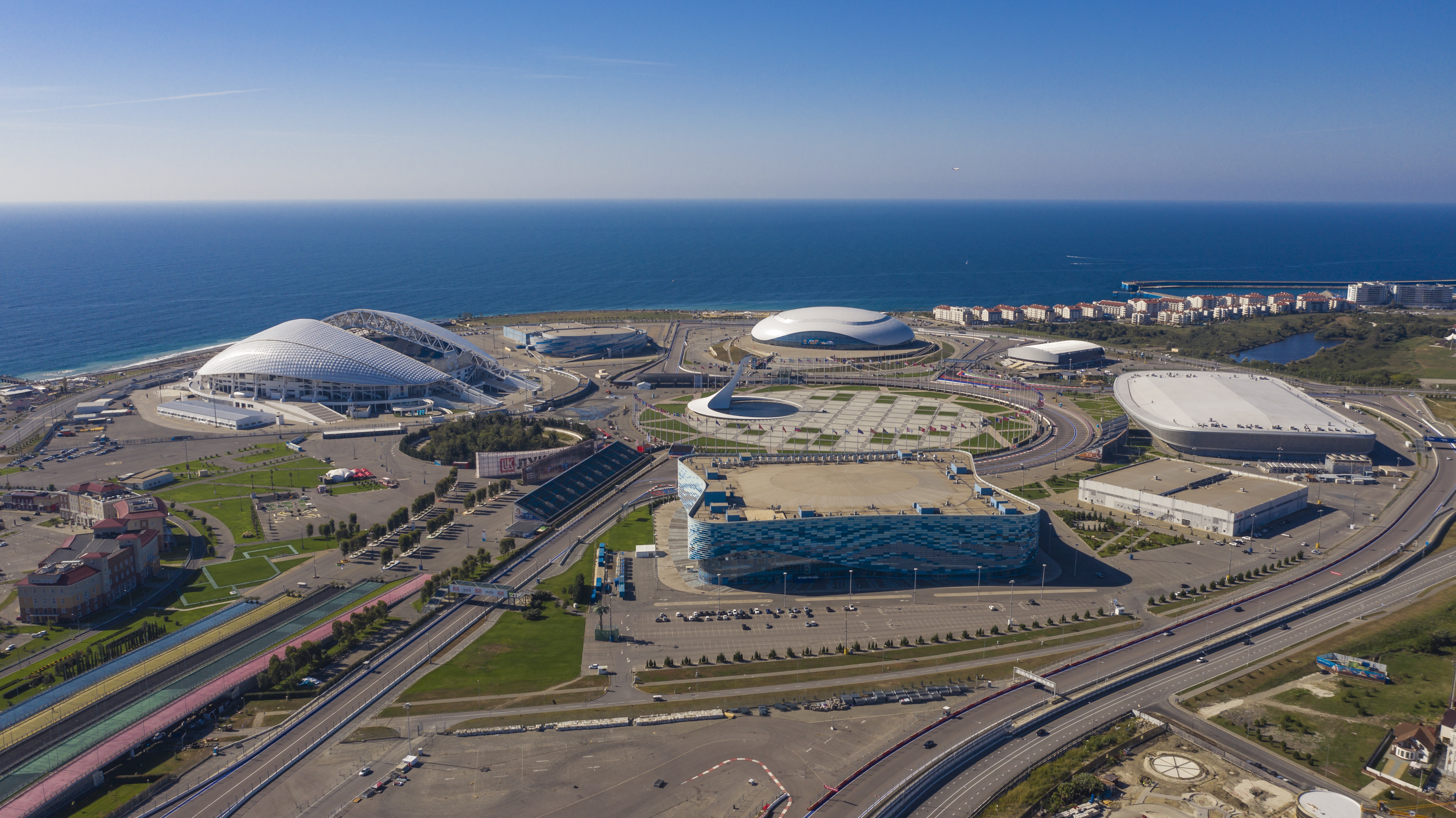
The Sochi Olympic Park was built for the 2014 Winter Olympics.

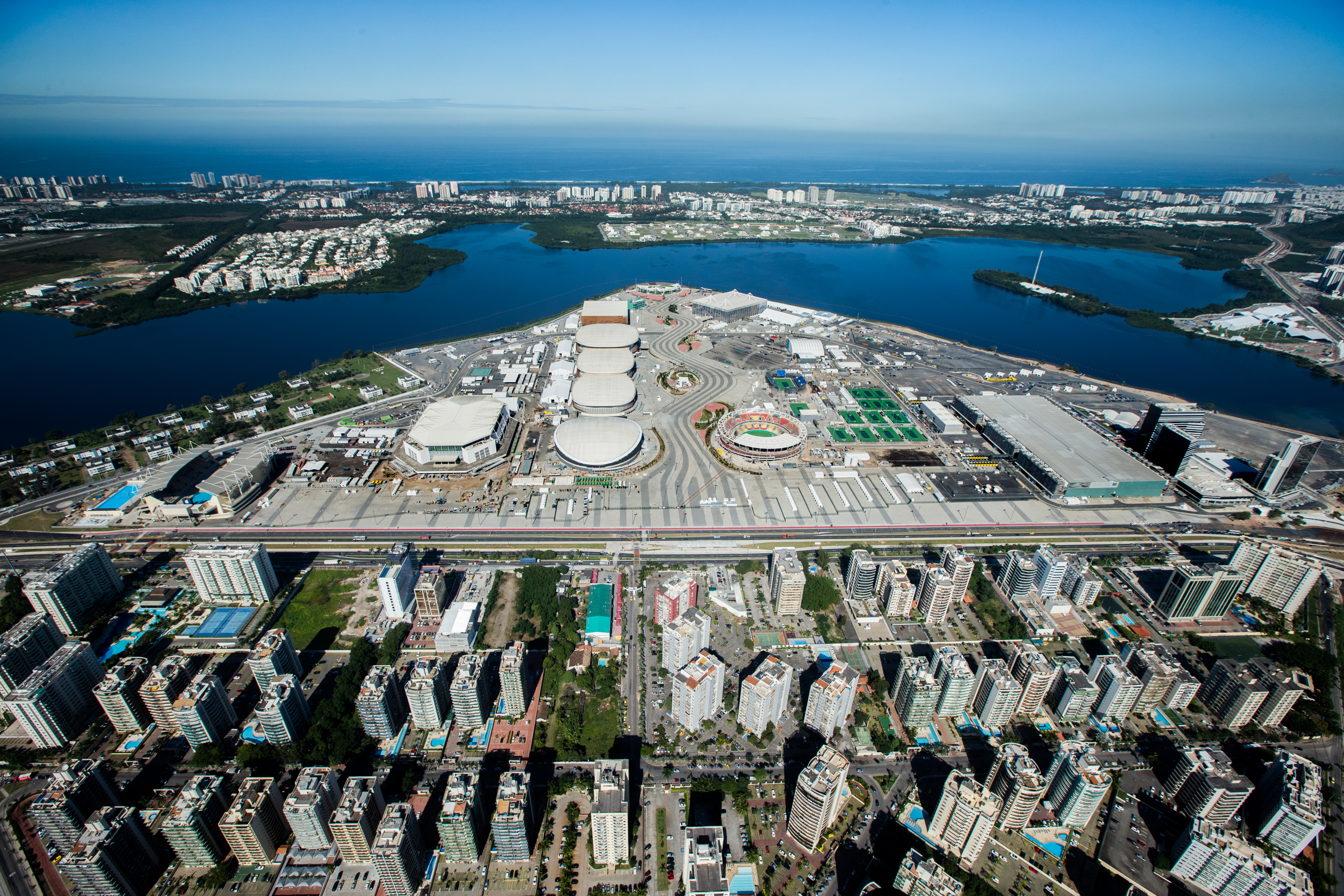
The Barra Olympic Park served as the Olympic Park for the 2016 Summer Olympics in Rio de Janeiro.

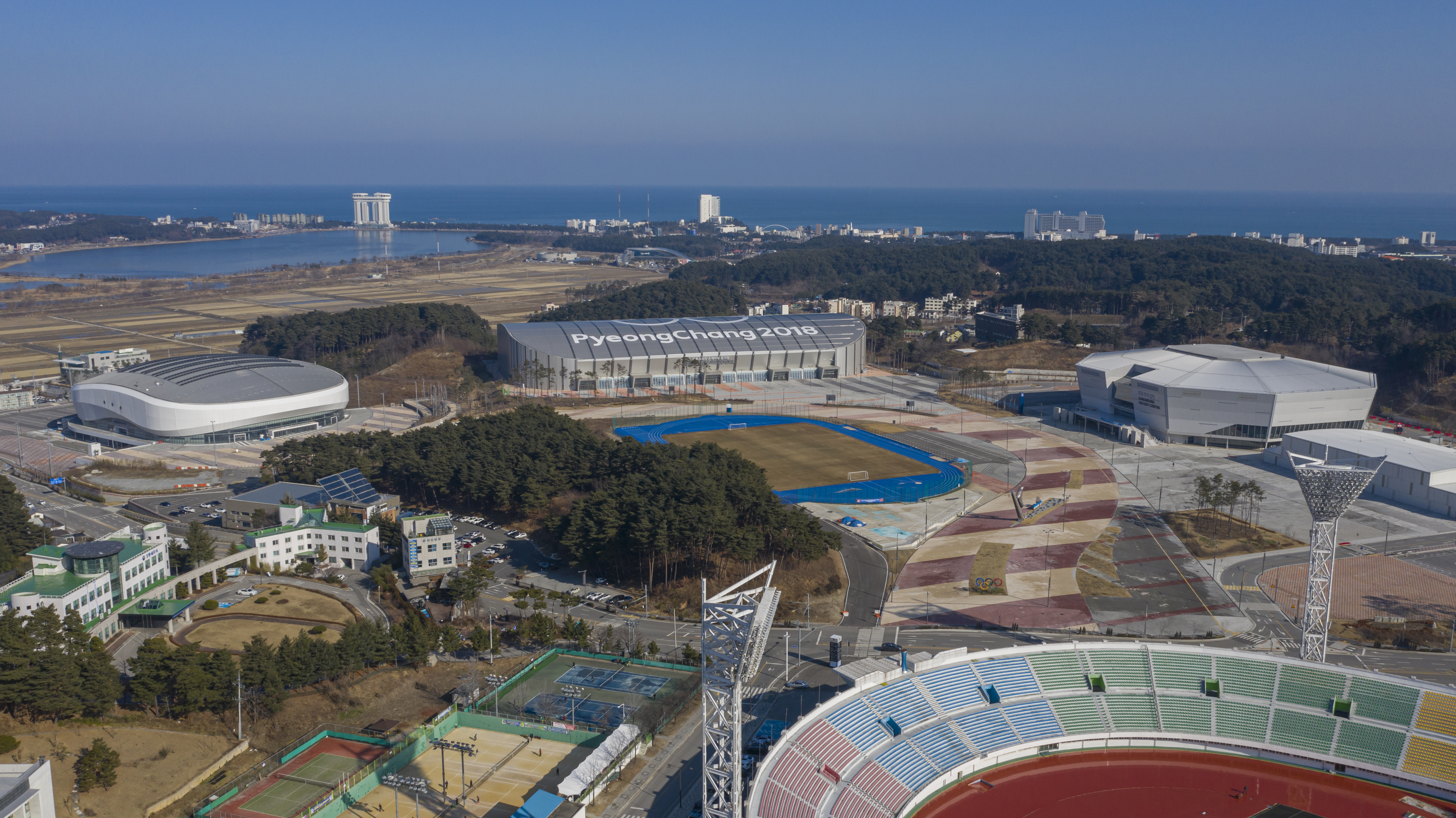
The Gangneung Olympic Park was built for the 2018 Winter Olympics in Pyeongchang.
