= PyeongChang Winners =

PyeongChang WINNERS, also known as WINNERS, is an initiative created by the PyeongChang Organizing Committee for the 2018 Olympic & Paralympic Winter Games in 2014 to promote the 2018 Winter Olympics by recruiting university students living in South Korea to spread awareness of the Winter Olympics through social networking services and news articles.

== History ==
WINNERS is divided into six-month time intervals where 30 students split into different groups actively create news articles and videos to spread awareness of the Winter Olympics. The first WINNERS group was recruited in November 2014 and began their activities in December. The second group of WINNERS also included three non-Korean students studying in South Korea. With the launch of the Chinese language website, the third group of WINNERS also recruited members to create content in Chinese as well as English and Korean.

- 1st Group (December 2014 - June 2015)
- 2nd Group (July 2015 - December 2015)
- 3rd Group (January 2016 - June 2016)

== Overview ==
PyeongChang WINNERS was founded under the idea that everyone can become an "Olympic Maker", a person that positively impacts the Olympics. In order to involve youth and to spread awareness about the event, the program was started to engage university students interested in winter sports. The members of PyeongChang WINNERS are part of a student reporting team where they write blog posts and create videos about the Winter Olympics for the Organizing Committee and share information about the Olympics on social media channels. Every member is required to write an article each month relating to the Olympics and the articles are posted on the official PyeongChang 2018 website. Additionally, every member is placed in a team of six students and are tasked with "Team Missions" that are also to be completed in that month. To compensate the students for their articles, the Olympic Committee gives 50,000 KRW to each member for each article they publish.

Members of PyeongChang WINNERS have additional activities such as tours of the host city, PyeongChang, opportunities to visit the sponsors of the events, as well as the opportunity to meet the honorary ambassadors of the Games, such as Yuna Kim. Monthly meetings are also held at the Korean Air headquarters, an official sponsor of the Games, in Seoul where they receive feedback on the previous month and attend guest lectures about various aspects of the Winter Olympics.

== See also ==
- 2018 Winter Olympics
- PyeongChang Organizing Committee for the 2018 Olympic & Paralympic Winter Games
