= Gangneung Olympic Park =

Sports complex in Gangneung, South Korea

Coordinates: 37°46′36″N 128°53′56″E

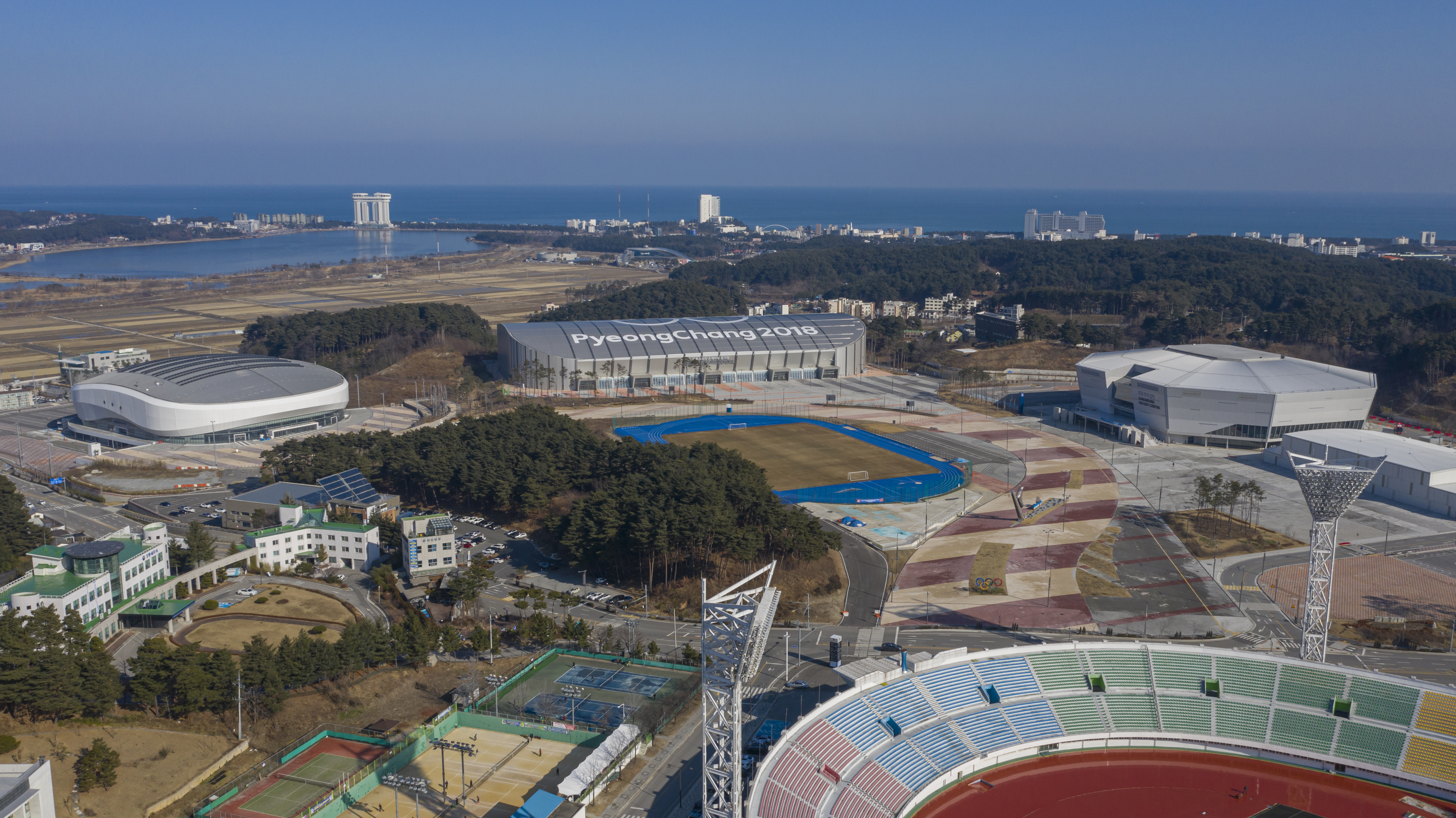
Gangneung Olympic Park

The Gangneung Olympic Park is a sports complex area in Gyo-dong, Gangneung, South Korea, which contains four of the 2018 Olympic Games venues and served as the Olympic Park.

It includes the following venues:

- Gangneung Hockey Centre – Ice Hockey (men competition)
- Gangneung Curling Centre – Curling
- Gangneung Oval - Speed skating
- Gangneung Ice Arena – Short track speed skating and Figure skating

The Gangneung Stadium is also located in the same area, but was not an Olympic venue.
