= Gyo-dong, Gangneung =

Neighborhood of Gangneung, South Korea

Coordinates: 37°46′01″N 128°53′12″E

- Hangul: 교동
- Hanja: 校洞
- RR: Gyo-dong
- MR: Kyo-dong

Gyo-dong (Korean: 교동) is a dong or neighborhood in the city of Gangneung, Gangwon province, South Korea.

== Transportation ==
- Gangneung Station

== Sports ==
- Gangneung Olympic Park
- Gangneung Stadium
