= 2018 Winter Olympics =

Multi-sport event in Pyeongchang, South Korea

XXIII Olympic Winter Games
- Emblem of the 2018 Winter Olympics
- Location: Pyeongchang, South Korea
- Motto: Passion. Connected.; (하나된 열정)
- Nations: 93 (Note: Including United Korean (COR) women's ice hockey team.)
- Athletes: 2,899 (1,657 men and 1,242 women)
- Events: 102 in 7 sports (15 disciplines)
- Opening: 9 February 2018
- Closing: 25 February 2018
- Opened by: President Moon Jae-in
- Closed by: IOC president Thomas Bach
- Cauldron: Kim Yun-a
- Stadium: Pyeongchang Olympic Stadium

- 2018 Winter Olympics
- Hangul: 평창 동계 올림픽 대회
- RR: Pyeongchang donggye Ollimpik daehoe
- MR: P'yŏngch'ang tonggye Ollimp'ik taehoe

XXIII Olympic Winter Games
- Hangul: 제23회 동계 올림픽 대회
- RR: Je23hoe donggye Ollimpik daehoe
- MR: Che23hoe tonggye Ollimp'ik taehoe

The 2018 Winter Olympics, officially the XXIII Olympic Winter Games (Korean: 제23회 동계 올림픽) and also known as PyeongChang 2018 (평창2018), was an international winter multi-sport event held between 9 and 25 February 2018 in Pyeongchang County, South Korea, with the opening rounds for certain events held on 8 February, a day before the opening ceremony.

Pyeongchang was selected as the host city for the 2018 Winter Games at the 123rd IOC Session in Durban, South Africa, on 6 July 2011. This marked the second time that South Korea had hosted the Olympic Games (having previously hosted the 1988 Summer Olympics in Seoul), as well as the first time it hosted the Winter Olympics. The 2018 Games marked the third time that an Asian country had hosted the Winter Olympics, after Sapporo 1972 and Nagano 1998, both in Japan. It was also the first Winter Olympics held in mainland Asia, and the first of three consecutive Olympic Games held in East Asia, preceding the Tokyo 2020 Summer Olympics in Japan and the Beijing 2022 Winter Olympics in China.

The 2018 Games featured 102 events over 15 disciplines, a record number of events for the Winter Games. This is the first edition in Winter Olympic Games history to feature more than 100 medal events, four of which made their Olympic debut in 2018: "big air" snowboarding, mass start speed skating, mixed doubles curling, and mixed team alpine skiing. A total of 2,914 athletes from 93 teams competed, with the national debuts of Ecuador, Eritrea, Kosovo, Malaysia, Nigeria and Singapore.

After a state-sponsored doping program was exposed following the 2014 Winter Olympics, the Russian Olympic Committee was suspended, but selected athletes were allowed to compete neutrally under the special IOC designation of "Olympic Athletes from Russia" (OAR), provided they could meet certain anti-doping requirements. North Korea agreed to participate in the Games in spite of tense relations with South Korea. The two nations paraded together at the opening ceremony as a unified Korea, and fielded a unified team (COR) in the women's ice hockey.

Norway led the total medal tally with 39, followed by Germany at 31 and Canada at 29. Germany and Norway were tied for the highest number of gold medals, both winning 14. The hosts, South Korea, ranked seventh overall at the 2018 Winter Games, with five gold medals and 17 overall medals. South Korea has traditionally been a country that won many medals in short track speed skating, but in this competition, it also won medals in skeleton racing, curling and skiing. South Korea's Yun Sung-Bin won a gold medal in men's skeleton racing, the first Olympic gold ever won by Asia in the sledding event.

== Bidding and election ==
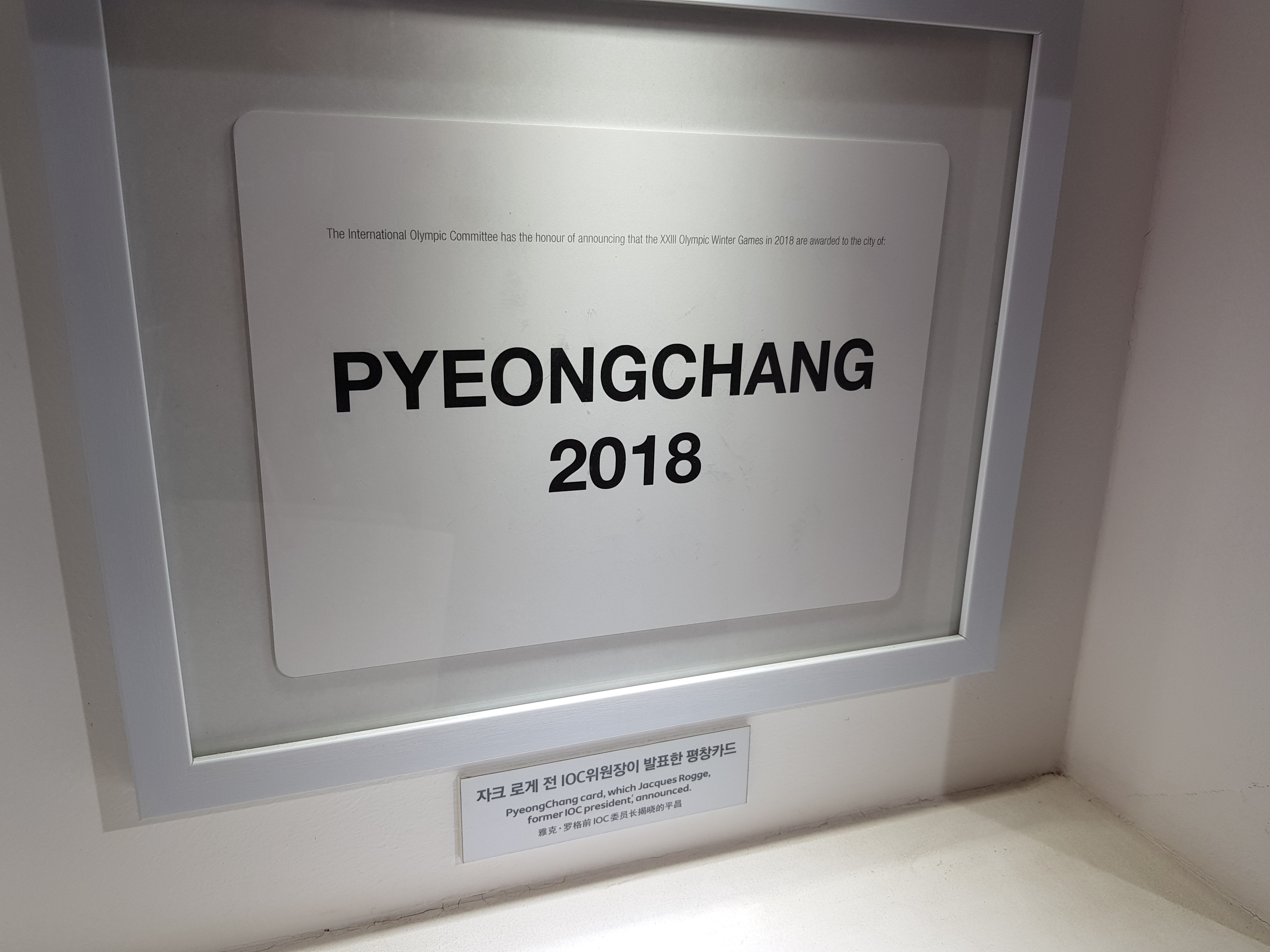
Pyeongchang's award card, announced by the IOC's honorary president Jacques Rogge

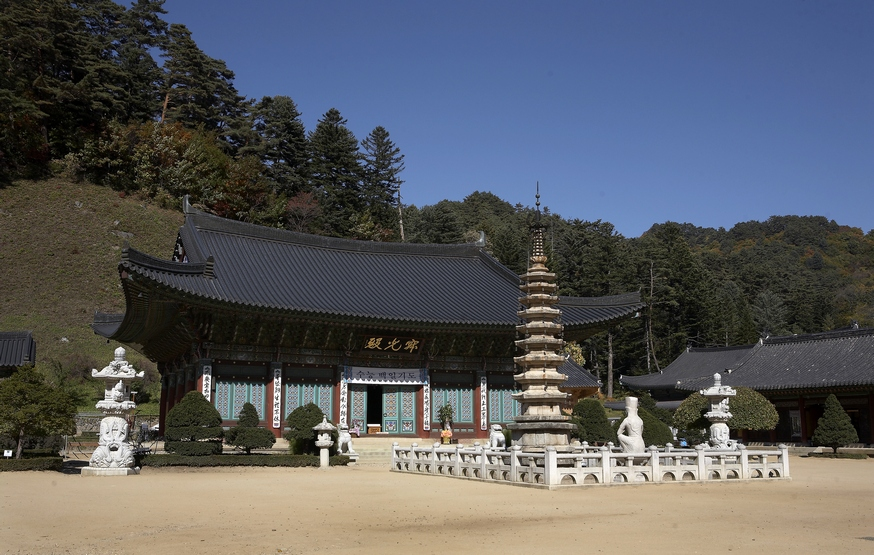
Woljeongsa in Pyeongchang, Gangwon-do

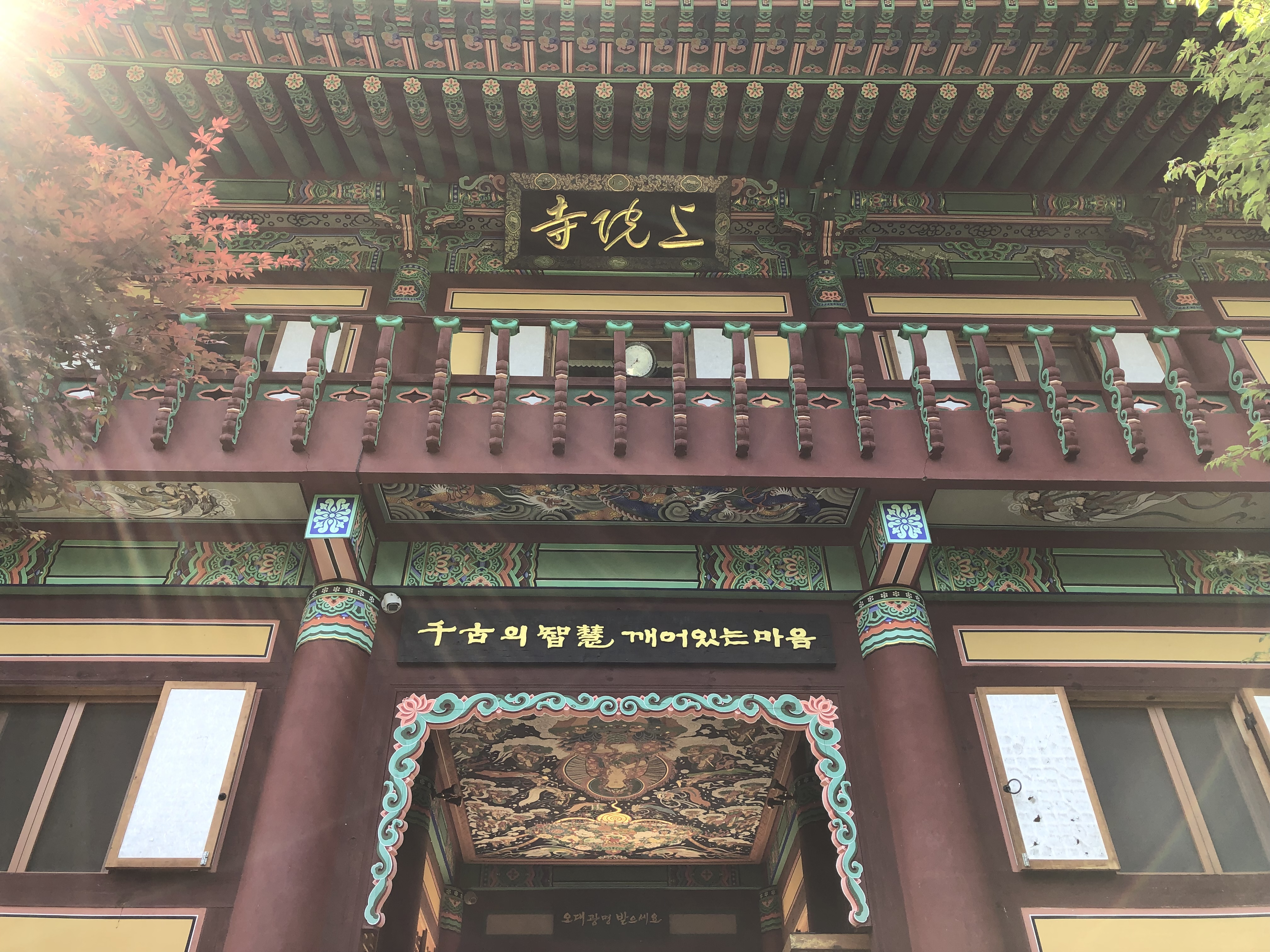
Sangwonsa in Pyeongchang, Gangwon-do

Pyeongchang was elected as the host city at the 123rd IOC Session in Durban, South Africa, on 6 July 2011, earning the necessary majority of at least 48 votes in just one round of voting. Winning 63 of the 95 votes cast in the first secret ballot, Pyeongchang received more votes than its competitors combined, overwhelmingly beating Munich in Germany (also hosted the 1972 Summer Olympics), which received 25 votes, and Annecy in France, which received seven.

This was South Korea's third consecutive bid for the Winter Olympics, having been defeated by Vancouver and Sochi respectively in the final rounds of voting for the 2010 and 2014 Games. Earlier, PyeongChang lost to Vancouver with a difference of 3 votes in bidding the 2010 Olympics, and lost to Sochi with a difference of 4 votes in bidding the 2014 Olympics. Since then, South Korea made great progress in preparing to host the Winter Olympics and succeeded in hosting the 2018 Olympics after three challenges.

After winning the election, Pyeongchang became the third Asian city to host the Winter Olympics. Also, South Korea became the second country in Asia to host both the Summer (1988 Summer Olympics) and Winter Olympics.

2018 Winter Olympics bidding results
City	Nation	Votes
Pyeongchang	South Korea	63
Munich	Germany	25
Annecy	France	7

== Development and preparation ==
Location of Pyeongchang in South Korea

On 5 August 2011, the International Olympic Committee (IOC) announced the formation of the Pyeongchang 2018 Coordination Commission. On 4 October 2011, it was announced that the organizing committee for the 2018 Winter Olympics would be headed by Kim Jin-sun. The Pyeongchang Organizing Committee for the 2018 Olympic & Paralympic Winter Games (POCOG) was launched at its inaugural assembly on 19 October 2011. The first tasks of the organising committee were putting together a master plan for the Games as well as forming a design for the venues. The IOC Coordination Commission for the 2018 Winter Olympics made their first visit to Pyeongchang in March 2012. By then, construction was already underway on the Olympic Village. In June 2012, construction began on a high-speed rail line that would connect Pyeongchang to Seoul.

The International Paralympic Committee met for an orientation with the Pyeongchang 2018 organising committee in July 2012. Then-IOC President Jacques Rogge visited Pyeongchang for the first time in February 2013.

The Pyeongchang Organizing Committee for the 2018 Olympic & Paralympic Winter Games created Pyeongchang WINNERS in 2014 by recruiting university students living in South Korea to spread awareness of the Olympic Games through social networking services and news articles.

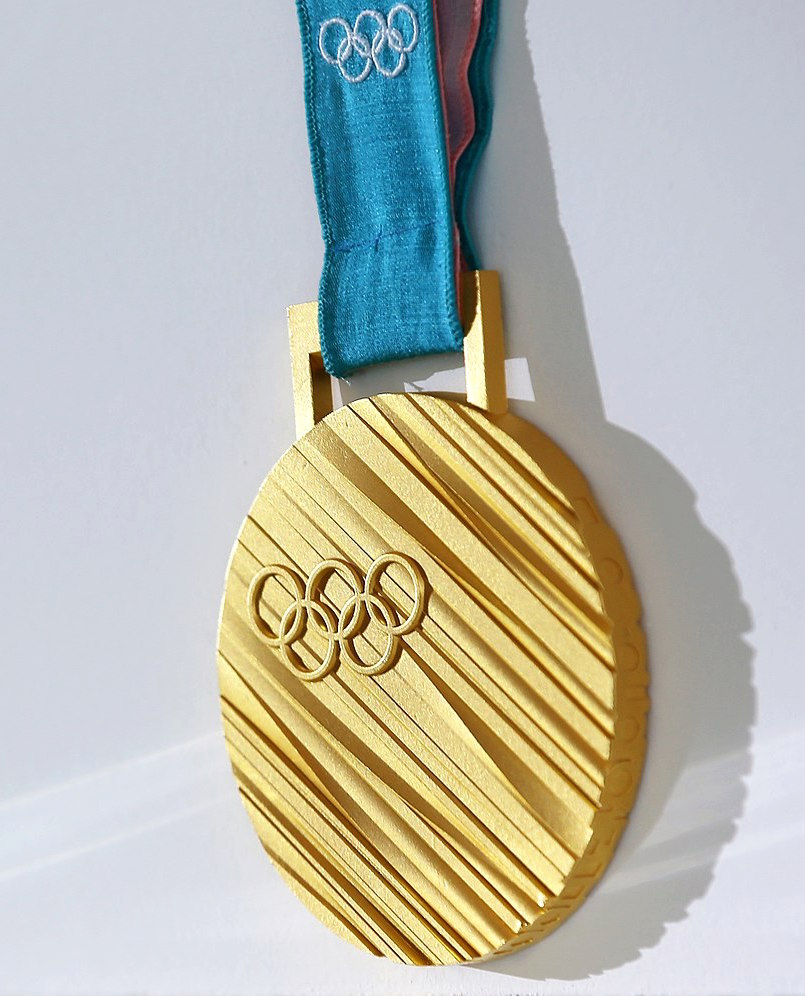
2018 Olympics gold medal

=== Medals ===
The design for the Games' medals was unveiled on 21 September 2017. Created by Lee Suk-woo, the design features a pattern of diagonal ridges on both sides, with the Olympic rings on the front, and the obverse showing the 2018 Olympics' emblem, the event name and the discipline. The edge of each medal is marked with extrusions of hangul alphabets, while the ribbons are made from a traditional South Korean textile. Gold medals contained 99 percent of silver and 1 percent of gold, which is a traditional composition for Olympic gold medals. At 586 grams (20.7 oz) they were the heaviest medals in the Olympic history.

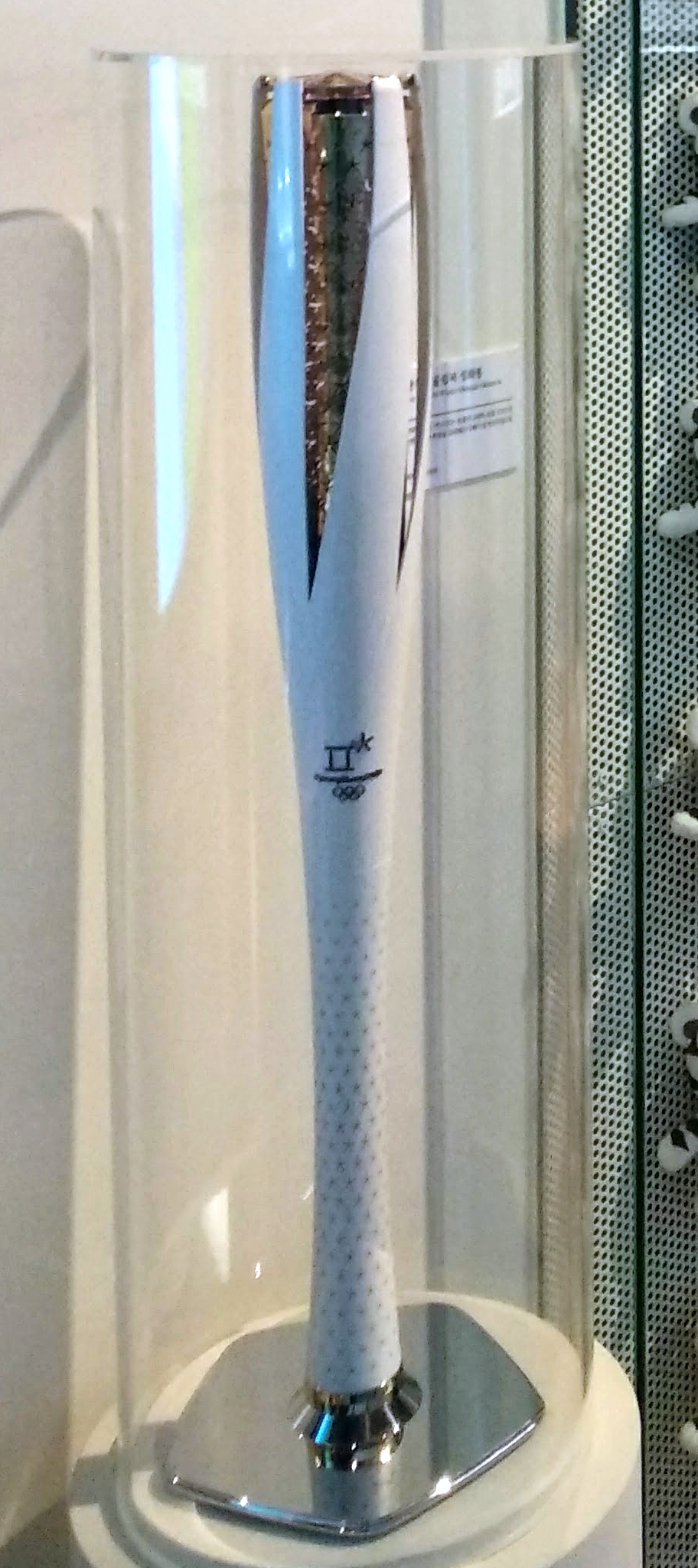
2018 Winter Olympics torch

=== Torch relay ===
The torch relay started on 24 October 2017 in Greece and lasted for 101 days, ending at the start of the Olympics on 9 February 2018. The Olympic torch entered South Korea on 1 November 2017. There were 7,500 torch bearers to represent the combined Korean population of approximately 75 million people. There were also 2,018 support runners to guard the torch and act as messengers.

The torch and its bearers traveled by a diverse means of transportation, including by turtle ship in Hansando Island, sailboat on the Baengmagang River in Buyeo, marine cable car in Yeosu, zip-wire over Bamseom Island, steam train in the Gokseong Train Village, marine rail bike along the east coast in Samcheok, and by yacht in Busan Metropolitan City.

There were also robot torch relays in Jeju and Daejeon.

=== Venues ===
Olympic venues 2018

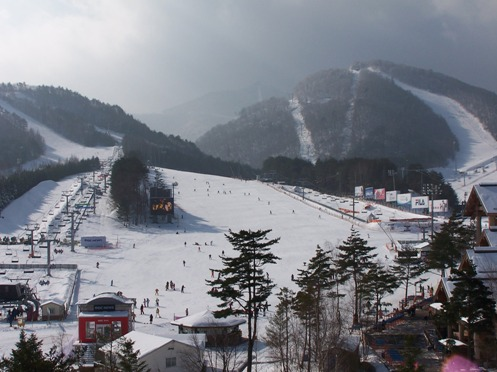
Dragon Valley (Alpensia) Ski Resort

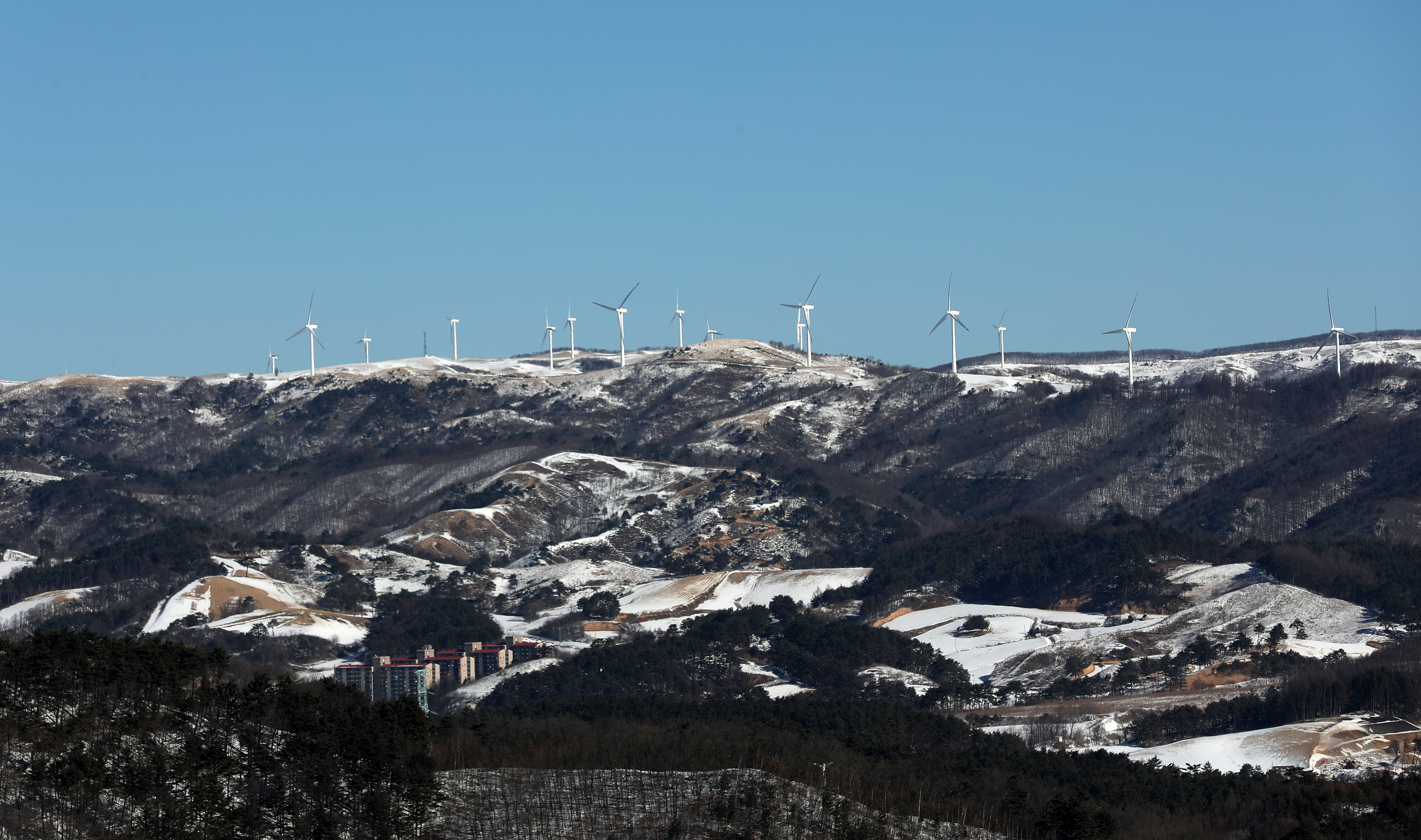
Alpensia Resort and wind turbines in Pyeongchang

Most of the outdoor snow events were held in the county of Pyeongchang, while some of the alpine skiing events took place in the neighbouring county of Jeongseon. The indoor ice events were held in the nearby city of Gangneung.

==== Pyeongchang (mountain cluster) ====
The Alpensia Sports Park in Daegwallyeong-myeon, Pyeongchang, was the focus of the 2018 Winter Olympics. It was home to the Olympic Stadium, the Olympic Village and most of the outdoor sports venues.

- Alpensia Ski Jumping Centre – ski jumping, Nordic combined, snowboarding (big air)
- Alpensia Biathlon Centre – biathlon
- Alpensia Cross-Country Skiing Centre – cross-country skiing, Nordic combined
- Alpensia Sliding Centre – luge, bobsleigh, skeleton
- Yongpyong Alpine Centre – alpine skiing (slalom, giant slalom)

Additionally, a stand-alone outdoor sports venue was located in Bongpyeong-myeon, Pyeongchang:

- Phoenix Snow Park – freestyle skiing, snowboarding

Another stand-alone outdoor sports venue was located in neighbouring Jeongseon county:

- Jeongseon Alpine Centre – alpine skiing (downhill, super-G, combined)

==== Gangneung (coastal cluster) ====
The Gangneung Olympic Park, in the neighbourhood of Gyo-dong in Gangneung city, includes four indoor sports venues, all in close proximity to one another.

- Gangneung Hockey Centre – ice hockey (men's competition)
- Gangneung Curling Centre – curling
- Gangneung Oval – long track speed skating
- Gangneung Ice Arena – short track speed skating, figure skating

In addition, a stand-alone indoor sports venue was located in the grounds of Catholic Kwandong University.

- Kwandong Hockey Centre – ice hockey (women's competition)

=== Ticketing ===
Ticket prices for the 2018 Winter Olympics were announced in April 2016 and tickets went on sale in October 2016. Event tickets ranged in price from ₩20,000 South Korean won (approx. US$15) to ₩900,000 (~US$672) while tickets for the opening and closing ceremonies ranged from ₩220,000 (~US$164) to ₩1.5 million (~US$1119). The exact prices were determined through market research; around 50% of the tickets were expected to cost about ₩80,000 (~US$60) or less, and tickets in sports that are relatively unknown in the region, such as biathlon and luge, were made cheaper in order to encourage attendance. By contrast, figure skating and the men's ice hockey gold-medal game carried the most expensive tickets of the Games.

As of 11 October 2017, domestic ticket sales for the Games were reported to be slow. Of the 750,000 seats allocated to South Koreans, only 20.7% had been sold. International sales were more favourable, with 59.7% of the 320,000 allocated tickets sold. However, as of 31 January 2018, 77% of all tickets had been sold.

== The Games ==
=== Opening ceremony ===
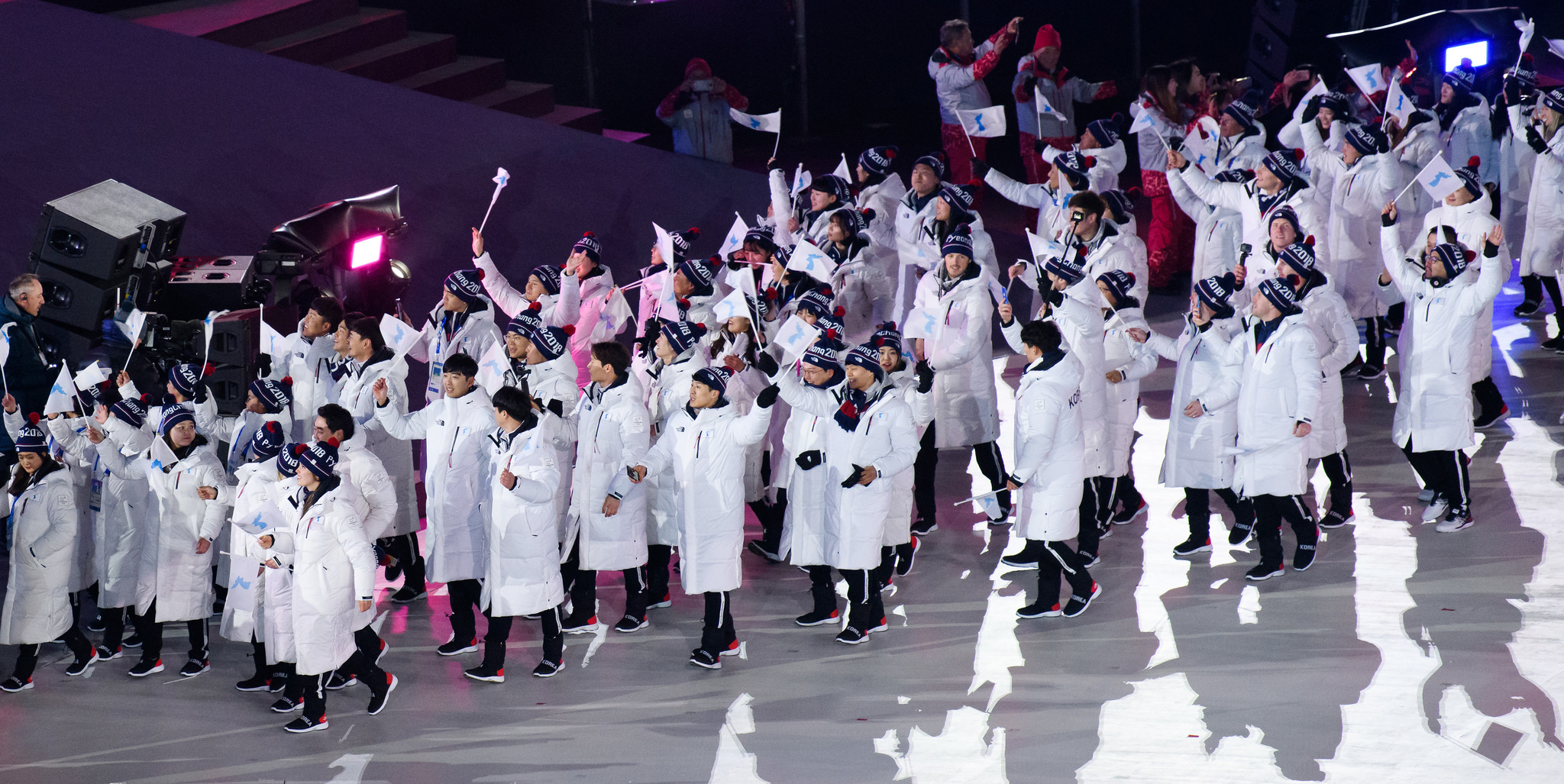
Parade of Nations at 2018 Olympic opening ceremony

The opening ceremony of the 2018 Winter Olympics was held at the Pyeongchang Olympic Stadium on 9 February 2018. The US$100 million facility was only intended to be used for the opening and closing ceremonies of these Olympics and the subsequent Paralympics; it was demolished following their conclusion.

=== Sports ===
The 2018 Winter Olympics featured 102 medal events over 15 disciplines in seven sports, making it the first Winter Olympics to surpass 100 medal events. Six new events in existing sports were introduced to the Winter Olympic program in Pyeongchang: men's and ladies' big air snowboarding, mixed doubles curling, men's and ladies' mass start speed skating, and mixed team alpine skiing.

2018 Winter Olympic sports program

- Biathlon (11)
- Bobsledding
  - Bobsleigh (3)
  - Skeleton (2)
- Curling (3)
- Ice hockey (2)
- Luge (4)
- Skating
  - Figure skating (5)
  - Short track speed skating (8)
  - Speed skating (14)
- Skiing
  - Alpine skiing (11)
  - Cross-country skiing (12)
  - Freestyle skiing (10)
  - Nordic combined (3)
  - Ski jumping (4)
  - Snowboarding (10)

Numbers in parentheses indicate the number of medal events contested in each separate discipline.

=== Participating National Olympic Committees ===
A record total of 93 teams qualified at least one athlete to compete in the Games. The number of athletes who qualified per country is listed in the table below (number of athletes shown in parentheses). Six nations made their Winter Olympics debuts: Ecuador, Eritrea, Kosovo, Malaysia, Nigeria and Singapore. Athletes from three further countries – the Cayman Islands, Dominica, and Peru – qualified to compete, but all three National Olympic Committees returned the quota spots back to the International Ski Federation (FIS).

Under a historic agreement facilitated by the IOC, qualified athletes from North Korea were allowed to cross the Korean Demilitarized Zone into South Korea to compete in the Games. The two nations marched together under the Korean Unification Flag during the opening ceremony. A unified Korean team, consisting of 12 players from North Korea and 23 from South Korea, competed in the women's ice hockey tournament under a special IOC country code designation (COR) following talks in Panmunjom on 17 January 2018. The two nations also participated separately: the South Korea team competed in every sport, while the North Korea team competed in alpine skiing, cross-country skiing, figure skating, and short track speed skating.

On 5 December 2017, the IOC announced that the Russian Olympic Committee had been suspended due to the Russian doping scandal and the investigation into the 2014 Winter Olympics in Sochi. Individual Russian athletes, who qualified and could demonstrate they had complied with the IOC's doping regulations, were given the option to compete at the 2018 Games as "Olympic Athletes from Russia" (OAR) under the Olympic flag and with the Olympic anthem played at any ceremony.

The participating countries at the 2018 Winter Olympics Debuting countries at the Winter Olympics Yellow circle is host city (Pyeongchang)

Country by team size

Participating National Olympic Committees
Albania (2); Andorra (5); Argentina (7); Armenia (3); Australia (50); Austria (105); Azerbaijan (1); Belarus (33); Belgium (22); Bermuda (1); Bolivia (2); Bosnia and Herzegovina (4); Brazil (9); Bulgaria (21); Canada (225); Chile (7); China (80); Chinese Taipei (4); Colombia (4); Croatia (19); Cyprus (1); Czech Republic (93); Denmark (17); Ecuador (1); Eritrea (1); Estonia (22); Finland (100); France (106); Georgia (4); Germany (153); Ghana (1); Great Britain (58); Greece (4); Hong Kong (1); Hungary (19); Iceland (5); India (2); Iran (4); Ireland (5); Israel (10); Italy (120); Jamaica (3); Japan (124); Kazakhstan (46); Kenya (1); Korea (35)^{[a]}; Kosovo (1); Kyrgyzstan (2); Latvia (34); Lebanon (3); Liechtenstein (3); Lithuania (9); Luxembourg (1); Macedonia (3); Madagascar (1); Malaysia (2); Malta (1); Mexico (4); Moldova (2); Monaco (4); Mongolia (2); Montenegro (3); Morocco (2); Netherlands (33); New Zealand (21); Nigeria (3); North Korea (10)^{[a]}; Norway (109); Olympic Athletes from Russia (168)^{[b]}; Pakistan (2); Philippines (2); Poland (62); Portugal (2); Puerto Rico (1); Romania (27); San Marino (1); Serbia (4); Singapore (1); Slovakia (56); Slovenia (71); South Africa (1); South Korea (122)^{[a]}(host); Spain (13); Sweden (116); Switzerland (166); Thailand (4); Timor-Leste (1); Togo (1); Tonga (1); Turkey (8); Ukraine (33); United States (241); Uzbekistan (2)
NOCs that participated in 2014, but not in 2018.	NOCs that participated in 2018, but not in 2014.
British Virgin Islands; Cayman Islands; Dominica; Nepal; Paraguay; Peru; Russia^{[b]}; Tajikistan; Venezuela; Virgin Islands; Zimbabwe	Bolivia; Colombia; Ecuador; Eritrea; Ghana; Kenya; Korea^{[a]}; Kosovo; Madagascar; Malaysia; Nigeria; North Korea^{[a]}; Olympic Athletes from Russia^{[b]}; Puerto Rico; Singapore; South Africa

==== Number of athletes by National Olympic Committee ====
IOC Letter Code	Country	Athletes
USA	United States	241
CAN	Canada	225
SUI	Switzerland	166
OAR	Olympic Athletes from Russia^{[b]}	168
GER	Germany	153
JPN	Japan	124
KOR	South Korea^{[a]}	122
ITA	Italy	120
SWE	Sweden	116
NOR	Norway	109
FRA	France	106
AUT	Austria	105
FIN	Finland	100
CZE	Czech Republic	93
CHN	China	80
SLO	Slovenia	71
POL	Poland	62
GBR	Great Britain	58
SVK	Slovakia	56
AUS	Australia	50
KAZ	Kazakhstan	46
COR	Korea^{[a]}	35
LAT	Latvia	34
BLR	Belarus	33
NED	Netherlands	33
UKR	Ukraine	33
ROU	Romania	27
EST	Estonia	22
BEL	Belgium	22
BUL	Bulgaria	21
NZL	New Zealand	21
CRO	Croatia	19
HUN	Hungary	19
DEN	Denmark	17
ESP	Spain	13
ISR	Israel	10
PRK	North Korea^{[a]}	10
BRA	Brazil	9
LTU	Lithuania	9
TUR	Turkey	8
CHI	Chile	7
ARG	Argentina	7
AND	Andorra	5
ISL	Iceland	5
IRL	Ireland	5
BIH	Bosnia and Herzegovina	4
COL	Colombia	4
GEO	Georgia	4
GRE	Greece	4
IRI	Iran	4
MEX	Mexico	4
MON	Monaco	4
SRB	Serbia	4
TPE	Chinese Taipei	4
THA	Thailand	4
ARM	Armenia	3
JAM	Jamaica	3
LBN	Lebanon	3
LIE	Liechtenstein	3
MKD	Macedonia	3
MNE	Montenegro	3
NGR	Nigeria	3
ALB	Albania	2
BOL	Bolivia	2
IND	India	2
KGZ	Kyrgyzstan	2
MAS	Malaysia	2
MDA	Moldova	2
MGL	Mongolia	2
MAR	Morocco	2
PAK	Pakistan	2
PHI	Philippines	2
POR	Portugal	2
UZB	Uzbekistan	2
AZE	Azerbaijan	1
BER	Bermuda	1
CYP	Cyprus	1
ECU	Ecuador	1
ERI	Eritrea	1
GHA	Ghana	1
HKG	Hong Kong	1
KEN	Kenya	1
KOS	Kosovo	1
LUX	Luxembourg	1
MAD	Madagascar	1
MLT	Malta	1
PUR	Puerto Rico	1
SMR	San Marino	1
SGP	Singapore	1
RSA	South Africa	1
TLS	Timor-Leste	1
TGA	Tonga	1
TOG	Togo	1

^{a} Apart from the respective delegations, North Korea and South Korea formed a unified Korean women's ice hockey team.
^{b} Russian athletes were entitled to participate as Olympic Athletes from Russia (OAR) if individually cleared by the IOC.

=== Event scheduling ===
The IOC has allowed NBC to influence the Olympic event scheduling to maximise U.S. television ratings when possible, due to the substantial fees paid by NBC for rights to the Olympics (which have been extended through 2032 with a nearly $8 billion agreement), the company being one of IOC's major sources of revenue. As figure skating is one of the most popular Winter Olympic sports among U.S. viewers, the figure skating events were scheduled with morning start times to accommodate primetime broadcasts in the Americas. This scheduling practice affected the events themselves, including skaters having to adjust to the modified schedule, as well as attendance levels at the sessions.

Conversely, and somewhat controversially, eight of the eleven biathlon events were scheduled at night, making it necessary for competitors to ski and shoot under floodlights, with colder temperatures and blustery winds.

=== Calendar ===
All dates are KST (UTC+9)

OC	Opening ceremony	●	Event competitions	1	Event finals	EG	Exhibition gala	CC	Closing ceremony

February	8th Thu	9th Fri	10th Sat	11th Sun	12th Mon	13th Tue	14th Wed	15th Thu	16th Fri	17th Sat	18th Sun	19th Mon	20th Tue	21st Wed	22nd Thu	23rd Fri	24th Sat	25th Sun	Events
Ceremonies		OC																CC	—N/a
Alpine skiing						1		2	2	1	1			1	2		1		11
Biathlon			1	1	2			2		1	1		1		1	1			11
Bobsleigh											●	1	●	1			●	1	3
Cross-country skiing			1	1		2		1	1	1	1			2			1	1	12
Curling	●	●	●	●	●	1	●	●	●	●	●	●	●	●	●	●	1	1	3
Figure skating		●		●	1		●	1	●	1		●	1	●		1		EG	5
Freestyle skiing		●		1	1			●	1	1	2	●	1	1	1	1			10
Ice hockey			●	●	●	●	●	●	●	●	●	●	●	●	1	●	●	1	2
Luge			●	1	●	1	1	1											4
Nordic combined							1						1		1				3
Short track speed skating			1			1				2			1		3				8
Skeleton								●	1	1									2
Ski jumping	●		1		1				●	1		1							4
Snowboarding			●	1	1	1	1	1	1			●		●	1		3		10
Speed skating			1	1	1	1	1	1	1		1	1		2		1	2		14
Daily medal events	0	0	5	6	7	8	4	9	7	9	6	3	5	7	10	4	8	4	102
Cumulative total	0	0	5	11	18	26	30	39	46	55	61	64	69	76	86	90	98	102	102
February	8th Thu	9th Fri	10th Sat	11th Sun	12th Mon	13th Tue	14th Wed	15th Thu	16th Fri	17th Sat	18th Sun	19th Mon	20th Tue	21st Wed	22nd Thu	23rd Fri	24th Sat	25th Sun	Total events

Medals used in the games

Bronze medal	Silver medal	Gold medal

=== Podium sweeps ===
Three podium sweeps were recorded during the Games.

Date	Sport	Event	NOC	Gold	Silver	Bronze	Ref
10 February	Speed skating	Women's 3000 metres	Netherlands	Carlijn Achtereekte	Ireen Wüst	Antoinette de Jong	
11 February	Cross-country skiing	Men's 30 km skiathlon	Norway	Simen Hegstad Krüger	Martin Johnsrud Sundby	Hans Christer Holund	
20 February	Nordic combined	Individual large hill/10 km	Germany	Johannes Rydzek	Fabian Rießle	Eric Frenzel	

=== Records ===
- Noriaki Kasai of Japan became the first athlete in history to participate in eight Winter Olympics when he took part in the ski jumping qualification the day before the opening of the Games. The previous record of seven Winter Olympics was held by Russian luger Albert Demchenko.
- Japanese athlete Yuzuru Hanyu became the fourth male figure skater (after Gillis Grafström, Karl Schäfer, and Dick Button) to win two consecutive Olympic gold medals.
- American Nathan Chen became the first figure skater to land five quadruple jumps in one program.
- German figure skaters Aliona Savchenko and Bruno Massot set a new ISU best free skating score of 159.31 in pair skating.
- Canadian figure skaters Tessa Virtue and Scott Moir became the most decorated figure skaters in Olympic history with a total of 5 medals.
- Canadian figure skaters Tessa Virtue and Scott Moir set a new ISU best short dance score of 83.67 and a new ISU best combined total score of 206.07 in ice dance. French ice dancers Gabriella Papadakis and Guillaume Cizeron set a new ISU best free dance score of 123.35.
- Russian figure skater Alina Zagitova set a new ISU best short program score of 82.92 in Ladies' single skating.
- Dutch speed skater Sven Kramer won gold in the men's 5000 m event, becoming the only male speed skater to win the same Olympic event three times. He was also the first man to win a total of eight Olympic medals in speed skating.
- Dutch speed skater Ireen Wüst won an individual gold medal for the fourth Olympics in a row, the first time this had been achieved by a Winter Olympian. She also became the first speed skater (male or female) to win ten Winter Olympic medals and the first female Winter Olympian to win nine individual medals.
- Chinese short track speed skater Wu Dajing beat the men's 500 m world record twice en route to winning a gold medal, becoming only the second person in history to skate the discipline in under 40 seconds (after American J. R. Celski), and the first to achieve this at "sea level".
- Dutch athlete Jorien ter Mors became the first female athlete to win Olympic medals in two different sports at a single Winter Games; she won a speed skating gold medal in the 1000 m and she was also part of the Dutch short track team that won bronze in the 3000 m relay.
- Ester Ledecká of the Czech Republic won gold in the super-G skiing event and another gold in the snowboarding parallel giant slalom, making her the first female athlete to win Olympic gold medals in two different sports at a single Winter Games.
- Norwegian cross-country skier Marit Bjørgen won bronze in the women's team sprint and gold in the 30 km classical event, bringing her total Olympic medal haul to fifteen, the most won by any athlete (male or female) in Winter Olympics history. The record was previously held by fellow Norwegian athlete Ole Einar Bjørndalen who has thirteen Olympic medals.
- Germany and Canada tied for gold in the two-man bobsleigh event, only the second time in history that two countries had tied for a gold medal in this particular event, the first time being in the 1998 Winter Olympics twenty years earlier.
- Norway won a total of 39 medals, setting a new record for the highest number of medals won at a single Winter Olympics. Their 39th medal was the last gold medal won by cross-country skier Marit Bjørgen in the 30 km classical event. The record was previously held by the USA who won 37 medals in Vancouver 2010.

=== Closing ceremony ===
The closing ceremony of the 2018 Winter Olympics was held at the Pyeongchang Olympic Stadium on 25 February 2018. IOC president Thomas Bach declared the Games closed, and the cauldron was extinguished. The Olympic flag was handed to Beijing, the next host city of the Winter Olympics.

== Medal table ==
* Host nation (South Korea)

2018 Winter Olympics medal table (Note: Figures in table reflect all official changes in medal standings.)
Rank	NOC	Gold	Silver	Bronze	Total
1	Norway	14	14	11	39
2	Germany	14	10	7	31
3	Canada	11	8	10	29
4	United States	9	8	6	23
5	Netherlands	8	6	6	20
6	Sweden	7	6	1	14
7	South Korea*	5	8	4	17
8	Switzerland	5	6	4	15
9	France	5	4	6	15
10	Austria	5	3	6	14
11	Japan	4	5	4	13
12	Italy	3	2	5	10
13	Olympic Athletes from Russia (Note: Olympic Athletes from Russia was the IOC designation of select Russian athletes permitted to participate in the 2018 Winter Olympics. The designation was instigated following the suspension of the Russian Olympic Committee after the Russian doping scandal.)	2	6	9	17
14	Czech Republic	2	2	3	7
15	Belarus	2	1	0	3
16	China	1	6	2	9
17	Slovakia	1	2	0	3
18	Finland	1	1	4	6
19	Great Britain	1	0	4	5
20	Poland	1	0	1	2
21	Hungary	1	0	0	1
21	Ukraine	1	0	0	1
23	Australia	0	2	1	3
24	Slovenia	0	1	1	2
25	Belgium	0	1	0	1
26	New Zealand	0	0	2	2
26	Spain	0	0	2	2
28	Kazakhstan	0	0	1	1
28	Latvia	0	0	1	1
28	Liechtenstein	0	0	1	1
Totals (30 entries)		103	102	102	307

== Broadcasting ==
Broadcast rights to the 2018 Winter Olympics were already sold in some countries as part of long-term broadcast rights deals, including the Games' local rightsholder SBS, which in July 2011 had extended its rights to the Olympics through 2024. SBS sub-licensed its rights to MBC and KBS. NHK and Olympic Broadcasting Services (OBS) once again filmed portions of the Games in high-dynamic-range 8K resolution video, including 90 hours of footage of selected events and the opening ceremonies. ATSC 3.0 digital terrestrial television, using 4K resolution, was introduced in South Korea in 2017 in time for the Olympics. This footage was delivered in 4K in the U.S. by NBCUniversal parent Comcast to participating television providers, including its own Xfinity, as well as DirecTV and Dish Network. NBC's Raleigh-based affiliate WRAL-TV also held demonstration viewings as part of its ATSC 3.0 test broadcasts.

The 2018 Winter Olympics were used to showcase 5G wireless technologies, as part of a collaboration between domestic wireless sponsor KT, and worldwide sponsor Intel. Several venues were outfitted with 5G networks to facilitate features such as live camera feeds from bobsleds, and multi-camera views from cross-country and figure skating events. These were offered as part of public demonstrations coordinated by the two sponsors.

The winners of the Olympic Golden Rings Awards were announced in June 2019. There were 75 pieces of broadcast content from the 2018 Olympics submitted over ten categories (plus one category for the 2018 Youth Olympics). U.S. broadcaster NBC won a total of eight awards, winning four of the main categories: Best Olympic Feature, Best Olympic Digital Service, Best Olympic program and Best Documentary Film; they came second in the Best On-Air Promotion and Best Social Media Content/Production categories. Discovery/Eurosport won four categories: Best On-Air Promotion, Best Production Design, Best Innovation and Best Social Media Content/Production; they also came second in the Best Olympic Digital Service category. NHK and the BBC in the United Kingdom took the other two main awards: Most Sustainable Operation and Best Athlete Profile respectively. The title of Best Feature at the Youth Olympic Games Buenos Aires 2018 was also awarded to the BBC.

== Marketing ==
The official emblem, reflecting ice crystals and derived from the hangul letters ㅍ and ㅊ—the initial sounds of "Pyeong" and "Chang"—was unveiled on 3 May 2013. The name of the host city was stylised in CamelCase as "PyeongChang" for promotional reasons, in order to alleviate potential confusion with Pyongyang—the similarly named capital of neighbouring North Korea.

New international sponsorship deals also debuted in Pyeongchang: Toyota was introduced as the new "Mobility" sponsor of the Olympics, although the company waived its domestic sponsorship to the local competitors Hyundai and Kia due to their support of the Pyeongchang bid. Alibaba Group and Intel also debuted as e-commerce/cloud services and technology sponsors respectively.

== Concerns and controversies ==
=== North–South Korean relations ===
Due to the state of relations between North and South Korea, concerns were raised over the security of the 2018 Winter Olympics, especially in the wake of tensions over North Korean missile and nuclear tests. On 20 September 2017, South Korean president Moon Jae-in stated that the country would ensure the security of the Games. The next day, Laura Flessel-Colovic, the French Minister of Youth Affairs and Sports, stated that France would pull out of the Games if the safety of its delegation could not be guaranteed.

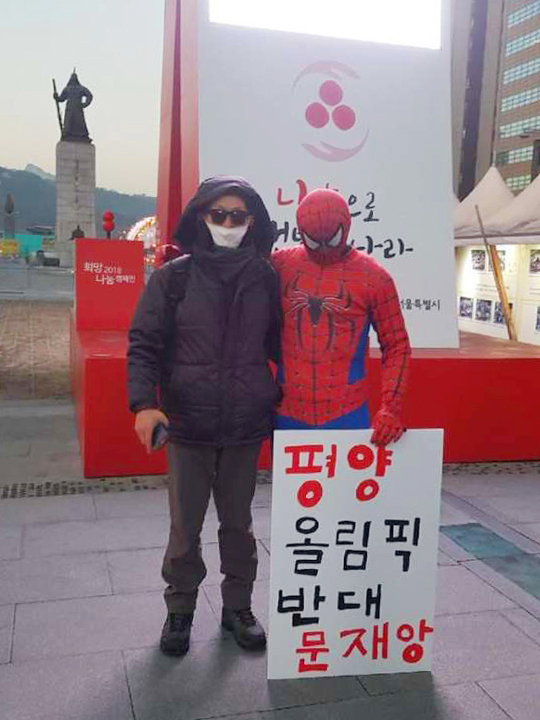
Protesters at Gwanghwamun Plaza, criticising the event's pro-North Korean measures

The next day, Austria and Germany raised similar concerns and also threatened to skip the Games. France later reaffirmed its participation. In early December 2017, the United States Ambassador to the United Nations, Nikki Haley, told Fox News that it was an "open question" whether the United States was going to participate in the Games, citing security concerns in the region. However, days later the White House Press Secretary, Sarah Huckabee Sanders, stated that the United States would participate.

In his New Year's address on 1 January 2018, North Korean leader Kim Jong Un proposed talks in Seoul over the country's participation in the Games, which would be the first high-level talks between the North and South in over two years. Because of the talks, held on 9 January, North Korea agreed to field athletes in Pyeongchang. On 17 January 2018, it was announced that North and South Korea had agreed to field a unified Korean women's ice hockey team at the Games, and to enter together under a Korean Unification Flag during the opening ceremony.

These moves were met with opposition in South Korea, including protests and online petitions; critics argued that the government was attempting to use the Olympics to spread pro-North Korean sentiment, and that the unified ice hockey team would fail. A rap video entitled "The Regret for Pyeongchang" (평창유감), which echoed this criticism and called the event the "Pyongyang Olympics", went viral in the country. Japan's foreign affairs minister Tarō Kōno warned South Korea to be wary of North Korea's "charm offensive", and not to ease its pressure on the country.

The South Korean President, Moon Jae-in, at the start of the Olympics shook hands with Kim Yo Jong, the sister of North Korean leader Kim Jong Un and a prominent figure of the regime. This marked the first time since the Korean War that a member of the ruling Kim dynasty had visited South Korea. In contrast, U.S. vice president Mike Pence met with Fred Warmbier (father of Otto Warmbier, who had died after being released from captivity in North Korea) and a group of North Korean defectors in Pyeongchang. American officials said that North Korea cancelled a meeting with Pence at the last minute.

At the closing ceremony, North Korea sent general Kim Yong-chol as its delegate. His presence was met with hostility from South Korean conservatives, as there were allegations that he had a role in the ROKS Cheonan sinking and other past attacks. The Ministry of Unification stated that "there is a limitation in pinpointing who was responsible for the incident." Although he is subject to sanctions, they did not affect his ability to visit the country for the Games.

=== Russian doping ===
Russia's participation in the 2018 Winter Olympics was affected by the aftermath of its state-sponsored doping program. As a result, the IOC suspended the Russian Olympic Committee in December 2017, although Russian athletes whitelisted by the IOC were allowed to compete neutrally under the OAR (Olympic Athletes from Russia) designation. The official sanctions imposed by the IOC included: the exclusion of Russian government officials from the Games; the use of the Olympic flag and Olympic Anthem in place of the Russian flag and anthem; and the submission of a replacement logo for the OAR uniforms.

By early January 2018, the IOC had banned 43 Russian athletes from competing in the 2018 Winter Olympics and all future Olympic Games (as part of the Oswald Commission). Of those athletes, 42 appealed against their bans to the Court of Arbitration for Sport (CAS) and 28 of the appeals were successful, but eleven of the athletes had their sanctions upheld due to the weight of evidence against them. The IOC found it important to note that CAS Secretary General "insisted that the CAS decision does not mean that these 28 athletes are innocent" and that they would consider an appeal against the court's decision. Hearings for the remaining three athletes were postponed.

The eventual number of neutral Russian athletes that participated at the 2018 Games was 168. These were selected from an original pool of 500 athletes that was put forward for consideration and, in order to receive an invitation to the Games, they were obliged to meet a number of pre-games conditions. Two athletes, who met the conditions and were cleared by the IOC, subsequently failed drug tests during the Games.

Russian president Vladimir Putin and other officials had signalled in the past that it would be a humiliation if Russian athletes were not allowed to compete under the Russian flag. However, there were never actually any official plans to boycott the 2018 Games and in late 2017 the Russian government agreed to allow their athletes to compete at the Games as individuals under a neutral designation. Despite this public show of co-operation, there were numerous misgivings voiced by leading Russian politicians, including a statement from Putin himself saying that he believed the United States had used its influence within the IOC to "orchestrate the doping scandal". 86% of the Russian population opposed participation at the Olympics under a neutral flag, and many Russian fans attended the Games wearing the Russian colours and chanting "Russia!" in unison, in an act of defiance against the ban.

The IOC's decision was heavily criticised by Jack Robertson, primary investigator of the Russian doping program on behalf of the World Anti-Doping Agency (WADA), in whose opinion the judgement was commercially and politically motivated. He argued that not only was doping rife among Russian athletes but that there was no sign of it being eradicated. The CAS decision to overturn the life bans of 28 Russian athletes and restore their medals was also fiercely criticised, by Olympic officials, IOC president Thomas Bach and whistleblower Grigory Rodchenkov's lawyer.

== See also ==
- 2018 Winter Paralympics
- Olympic Games held in South Korea
  - 1988 Summer Olympics – Seoul
  - 2018 Winter Olympics – Pyeongchang
- List of IOC country codes
- Soohorang and Bandabi

== Notes ==
Winter Olympics
Preceded by Sochi	XXIII Olympic Winter Games; Pyeongchang; 2018	Succeeded by Beijing
