= List of flag bearers for Thailand at the Olympics =

Thailand at the Olympics
- IOC code: THA
- NOC: National Olympic Committee of Thailand
- Website: www.olympicthai.or.th (in Thai and English)
- Medals: Gold 11 Silver 11 Bronze 19 Total 41

Summer appearances
- 1952; 1956; 1960; 1964; 1968; 1972; 1976; 1980; 1984; 1988; 1992; 1996; 2000; 2004; 2008; 2012; 2016; 2020; 2024

Winter appearances
- 2002; 2006; 2010; 2014; 2018; 2022; 2026

This is a list of flag bearers who have represented Thailand at the Olympics.

Flag bearers carry the national flag of their country at the opening ceremony of the Olympic Games.

| # | Event year | Season | Flag bearer | Sport |
|---|---|---|---|---|
| 1 | 1972 | Summer | Rangsit Yanothai | Shooting |
| 2 | 1984 | Summer | Rangsit Yanothai | Shooting |
| 3 | 1988 | Summer | Somchai Chanthavanij | Shooting |
| 4 | 1996 | Summer | Vissanu Sophanich | Athletics |
| 5 | 2000 | Summer | Somluck Kamsing | Boxing |
| 6 | 2002 | Winter | Prawat Nagvajara | Cross-country skiing |
| 7 | 2004 | Summer | Paradorn Srichaphan | Tennis |
| 8 | 2006 | Winter | Prawat Nagvajara | Cross-country skiing |
| 9 | 2008 | Summer | Worapoj Petchkoom | Boxing |
| 10 | 2012 | Summer | Nuttapong Ketin | Swimming |
| 11 | 2014 | Winter | Kanes Sucharitakul | Alpine skiing |
| 12 | 2016 | Summer | Ratchanok Intanon | Badminton |
| 13 | 2018 | Winter | Mark Chanloung | Cross-country skiing |
| 14 | 2020 | Summer | Savate Sresthaporn | Shooting |
| 14 | 2020 | Summer | Naphaswan Yangpaiboon | Shooting |
| 15 | 2022 | Winter | Karen Chanloung | Cross-country skiing |
| 15 | 2022 | Winter | Nicola Zanon | Alpine skiing |
| 16 | 2024 | Summer | Puripol Boonson | Athletics |
| 16 | 2024 | Summer | Vareeraya Sukasem | Skateboarding |

== See also ==
- Thailand at the Olympics
