= Italy–Thailand relations =

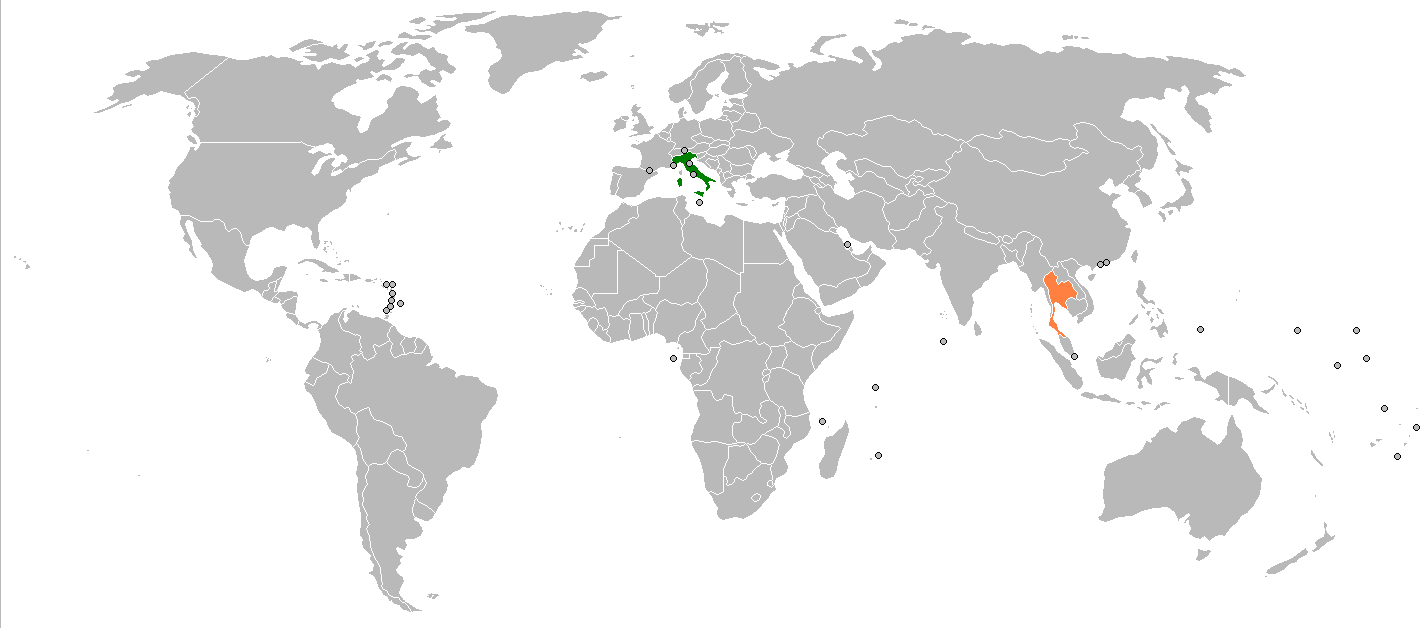
- Italy: Thailand

Diplomatic mission
- Embassy of Italy, Bangkok: Royal Thai Embassy, Rome

Envoy
- Paolo Dionisi: Puttaporn Ewtoksan

Italy–Thailand relations date back officially to 1868. Italy operates an embassy in Bangkok, along with a consulate in Chiang Mai and Phuket. Thailand operates an embassy in Rome. The Thai embassy in Rome also handles Thailand's relations with Albania, Cyprus, San Marino, and the Sovereign Military Order of Malta.

Italian culture has had a significant impact on modern Thailand, especially in its architecture.

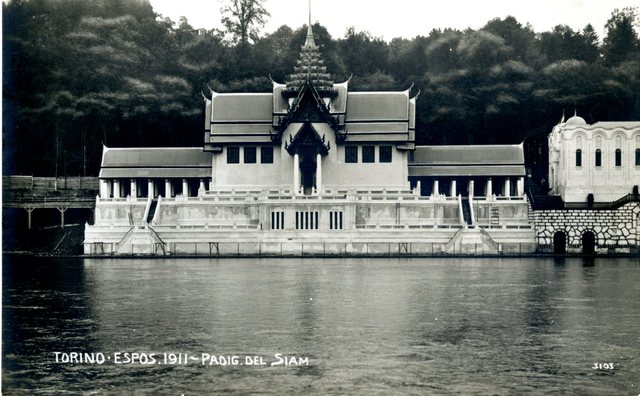
The exposition pavilion of Siam at the 1911 Turin International, designed by Mario Tamagno and Annibale Rigotti .

== History ==
=== Origins ===
In 1430, the Venetian merchant Nicolò de'Conti visited the Tenasserim region, becoming the first European to visit the region, and the first Italian to visit Thailand as the region was at that time a province of the Ayutthaya Kingdom.

In the early 1800s, Bangkok was called 'Venice of the East' due to the city's canals.

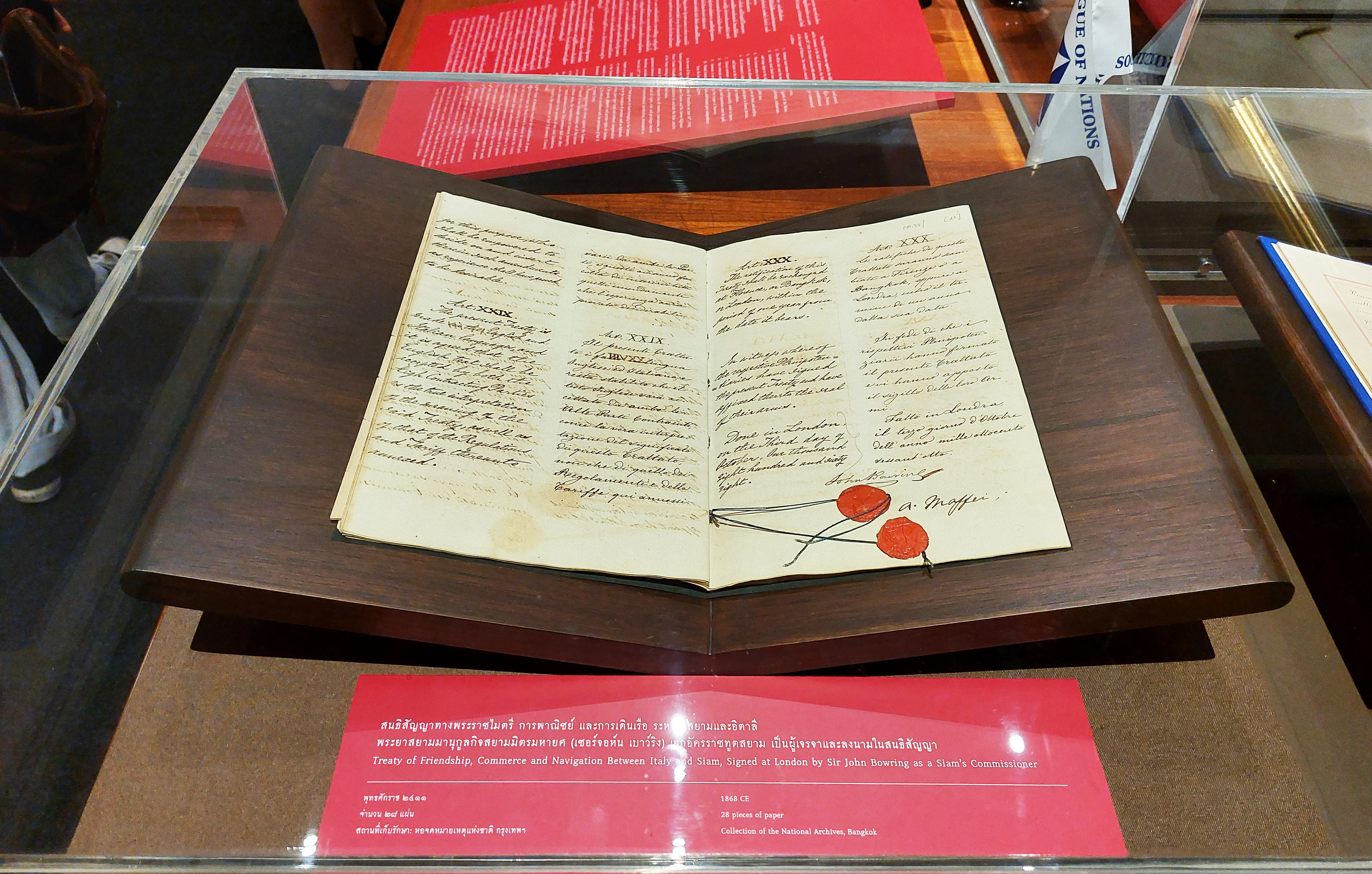
The Treaty of Friendship and Commerce dated 3 October 1868.

On 3 October 1868, representatives of King Chulalongkorn of Siam and King Victor Emmanuel II of Italy signed a Treaty of Friendship and Commerce. Since then, both nations have maintained bilateral relations between each other.

=== 20th century ===
King Vajiravudh's second coronation on 28 November 1911 was attended by Salvatore Besso, a Jewish Italian foreign correspondent, among other foreign dignitaries. In his time in Siam, he made several friendships with Siamese royals. After his death in 1912, his letters were published in the book "Siam and China" in 1913.

==== Siamese sanctions and Italian shipbuilding ====
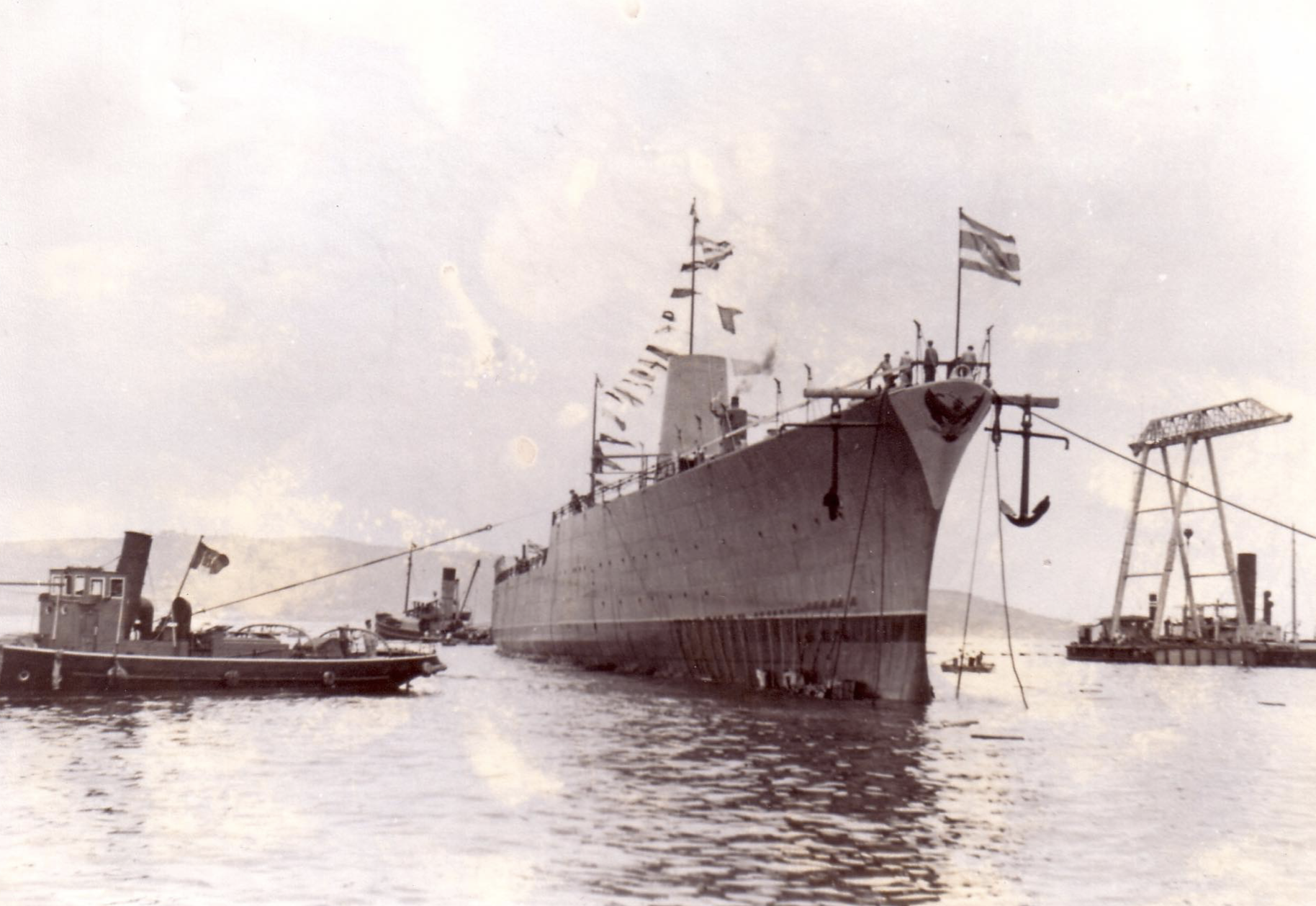
The Etna class cruiser Naresuan in Trieste, 6 August 1941

As part of the League of Nations, Siam imposed economic sanctions on Italy in 1935 in response to its invasion of Ethiopia. The move to impose sanctions was supported by the Minister of Interior Luang Pradist, and Minister of Foreign Affairs Srisena Sompatsiri. It was however opposed by Plaek Phibunsongkhram (Phibun), future Prime Minister of Siam and then Minister of Defence. At a General Assembly on 19 October 1935, Siam voted in favour of imposing sanctions. The sanctions were then imposed by four royal decrees, the first being issued on 28 October, and the next three on 17 November. Mostly economical, the sanctions had little impact on the Siamese economy due to the size of Italian-Siamese trade. For the Thai year 2477 (1934-35), imports from Italy were valued ฿250,000, while exports were valued ฿342,000.

There were however discussions between Phraya Ratchawangsan, former Defence Minister and Siam's Permanent Representative to the League, and Mani Sanasen, who was a staff of the Secretariat of the League, on exempting ships ordered from Italy by the Siamese navy from these sanctions. During the late 1930s and early 1940s, Italy built several ships for the Royal Thai Navy, who were satisfied at the mechanical reliability of Italian-made ships. This included seven torpedo boats and two mine-layers ordered in 1934-35 from Cantieri Riuniti dell'Adriatico at Monfalcone, which were scheduled to be delivered to Siam between late 1935 and 1937. Instead of cancelling the orders, the Siamese government began pushing to exempt them from the sanctions. The Foreign Affairs Ministry then instructed its delegates at the League to lobby British and French delegates to support the exemption. Siam was the only country that pushed for this until Norway, Poland, and the Soviet Union also began requesting exemptions. On 11 November, the Economic Committee decided to exempt ships contracts being built in Italy for Siam. A week later, one of the ordered torpedo boats was launched at Monfalcone. By mid-1937, all ordered ships had been delivered.

In 1938, the Thai navy ordered a pair of altered versions of the Italian Montecuccoli-class light cruisers from Cantieri Riuniti dell'Adriatico. The cruisers were called Taksin (Etna) and Naresuan (Vesuvio). Both ships were laid down in 1939 before Italy's entry into World War II. Construction continued normally until December 1941 when the Royal Italian Navy took over the construction. They were later seized by Nazi Germany in September 1943 and then scuttled during its operations in Italy.

During the Franco-Thai War, the French Indochinese fleet sunk three Italian-built torpedo boats off Koh Chang on 17 January 1941.

During World War II, both Italy and Thailand were part of the Axis powers. Thailand during the war was often compared to Italy, and was labeled by both its ally Japan and the Allies as the "Italy of Asia" or "Oriental Italy".

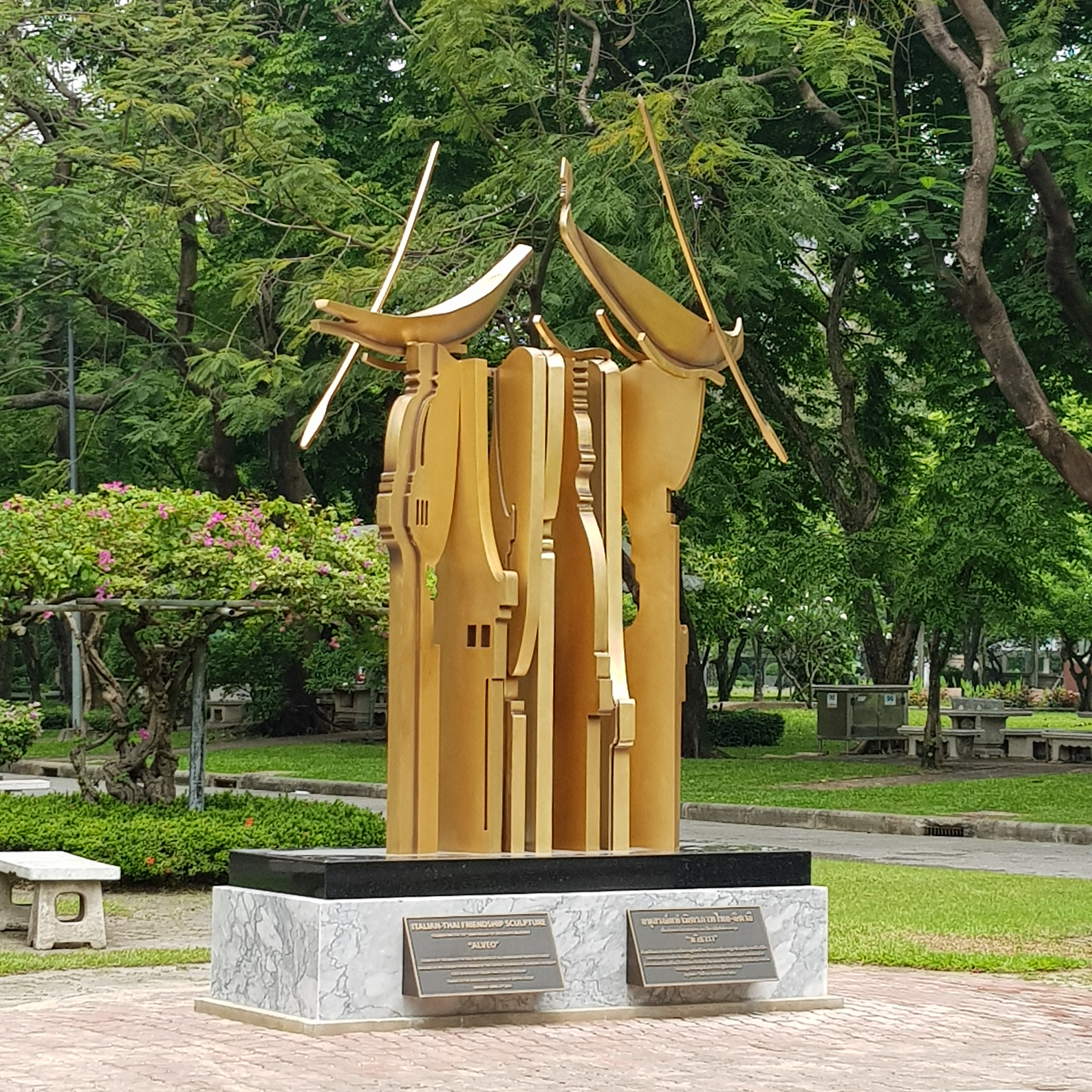
Alveo - sculpture of an Italian gondola and Thai e-pong at Lumphini park unveiled on 21 April 2018 to mark 150 years of relations. April 21 is the date both Rome and Bangkok were founded.

=== 21st century ===
At Suvarnabhumi airport on 30 March 2012, fugitive Italian businessman Vito Roberto Palazzolo was arrested on money laundering charges after being convicted in Italy in 2009. On 20 December 2012, a Thai court ordered his extradition back to Italy.

In September 2013, Thai Prime Minister Yingluck Shinawatra called on Italian Prime Minister Enrico Letta to support the second round of negotiations of a European Union-Thailand Free Trade Agreement, while Thailand would support Italy in hosting the 2014 Asia–Europe Meeting summit and its Expo 2015 bid.

In November 2016, the first political consultation between the two nations took place in Rome. In February 2017, Italian foreign minister Angelino Alfano made a visit to Bangkok, and in March, his counterpart Don Pramudwinai visited Rome. On the sidelines of the 2018 Asia–Europe Meeting summit in Brussels, Italian Prime Minister Giuseppe Conte met with Thai PM Prayut Chan-o-cha.

== Economy and trade ==
In 2022, Italy exported $2.06 billion USD to Thailand, while Thailand exported $2.46 billion USD to Italy. Italian exports have increased at an annualized rate of 1.8% since 1995 where its exports were worth $1.27 billion. Thai exports since 1995 have increased more at an annualized rate of 4.88% from $680 million in 1995. In 2020, Italy exported services worth $76.3 million to Thailand. According to The Observatory of Economic Complexity, both nation's top 5 exports to each other in December 2023 are listed below:

Italy's top exports to Thailand

- Trunks and cases, $93.1 million
- Valves, $79.9 million
- Integrated circuits, $79.3 million
- Bi-wheel vehicle parts, $74.3 million
- Jewellery, $60.9 million

Thailand's top exports to Italy

- Air conditioners, $248 million
- Animal feed, $183 million
- Electrical transformers, $147 million
- Prescious stones, $118 million
- Jewellery, $96.8 million

The Italian-Thai Development PCL, established in 1954 by Thai and Italian businessmen, is a construction company based in Bangkok that helped construct Suvarnabhumi airport.

When Paolo Dionisi became the Italian ambassador to Thailand in January 2023, he told PM Prayut Chan-o-Cha that Italy was interested in investing into Thailand's Eastern Economic Corridor (EEC), particularly in the motorcycle industry. Rayong province, which is part of the EEC, saw the Italian motorcycle manufacturer Ducati open a ฿400 million factory in April 2024.

The 7th High-level Dialogue on ASEAN-Italy Economic Relations was co-hosted by Thailand and Italy on October 4th 2023, marking 155 years of diplomatic ties. The talks covered sustainability, green transition and economic cooperation.

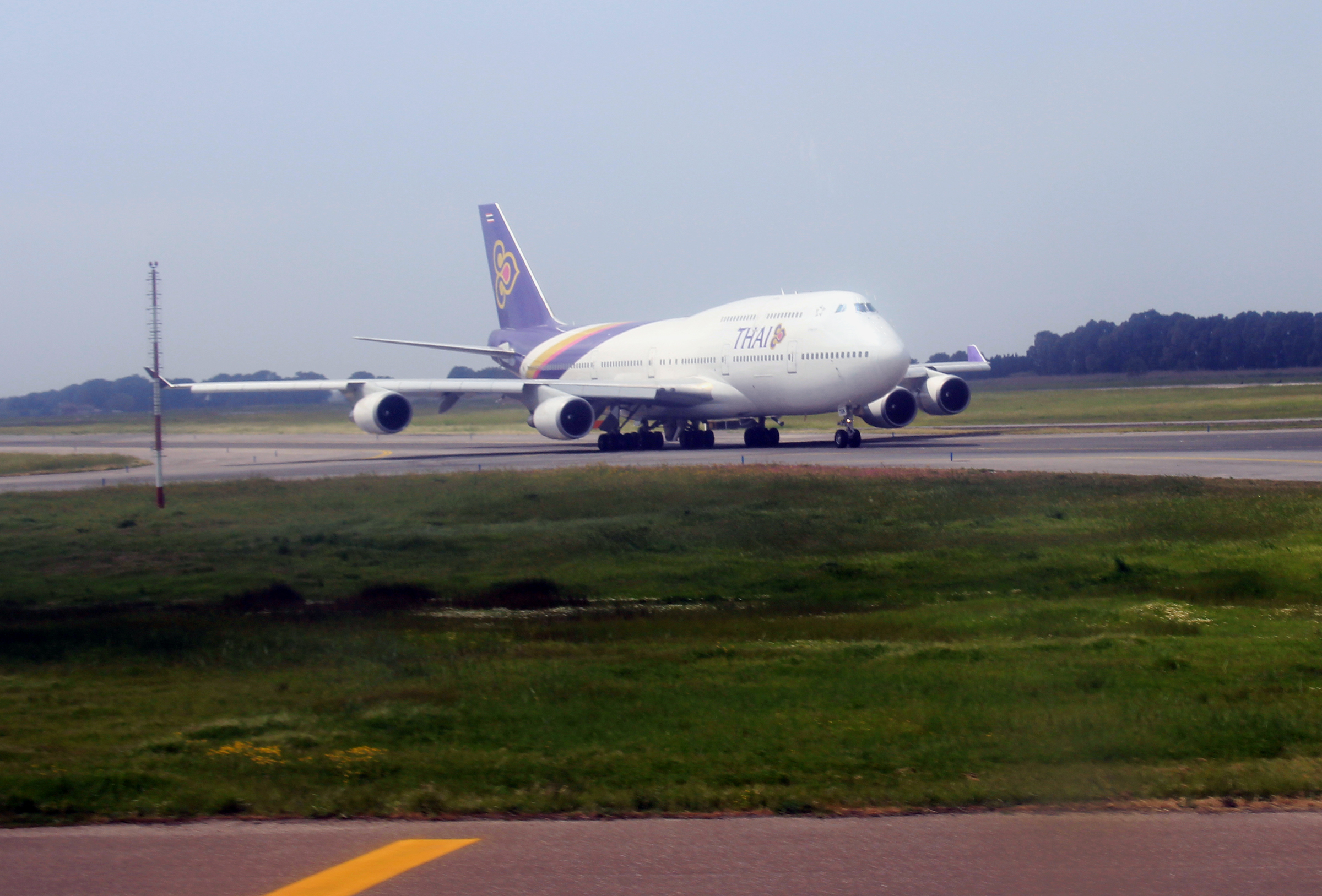
Thai Airways plane at Fiumicino airport, 2011

The Geo-Informatics and Space Technology Development Agency of Thailand maintains cooperations with the Italian Space Agency in space and satellite technology.

=== Tourism ===
As of April 2024, there currently exists no direct flights between Italy and Thailand. However, Thai Airways plans to resume flights between Suvarnabhumi airport and Milan Malpensa Airport on 1 July 2024.

In 2018, over 280,000 Italians visited Thailand, an increase from 265,000 in 2017. In 2018, 37,000 Thais visited Italy.

== State and official visits ==
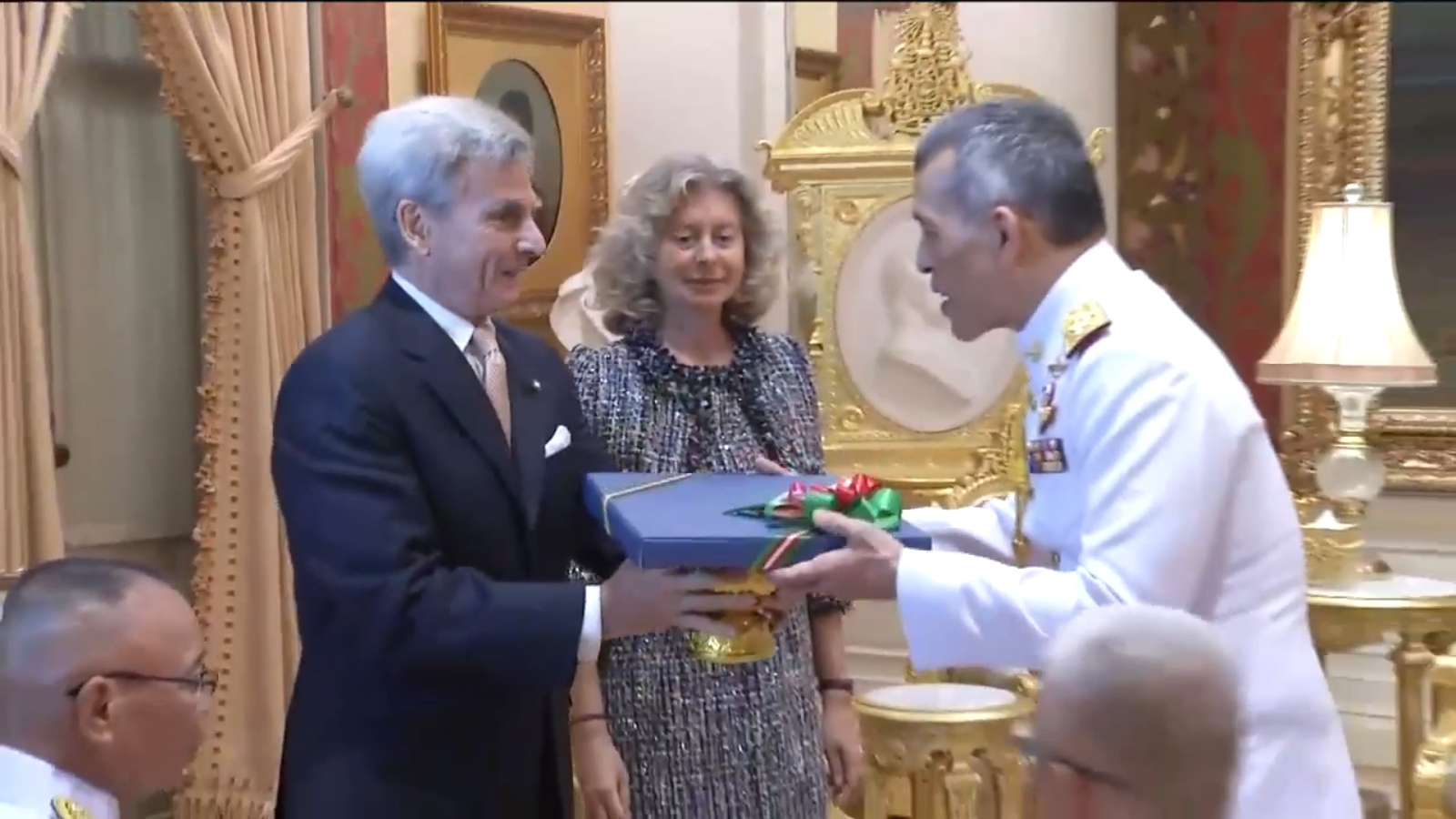
King Vajiralongkorn with Italian ambassador Francesco Saverio Nisio inside the Amphorn Sathan Residential Hall

As of 2024, no Italian monarch, President or Prime Minister has visited Thailand. In 2013, Prime Minister Enrico Letta agreed to make a visit to Thailand around July 2014. However, before this could happen, Letta resigned in February 2014, and Thailand experienced a coup. Current Italian Prime Minister Giorgia Meloni has expressed interests to visit Thailand.

The first Thai monarch to visit Italy was King Chulalongkorn in 1897 as part of his first royal trip to Europe. In Italy, he visited Florence, Milan, and Venice, before travelling to Geneva, and then back to Rome where he met King Umberto I. Chulalongkorn also made a visit to Saint Peter's Basilica before leaving for Piotrków. The last Thai Prime Minister to visit Italy was Yingluck Shinawatra in September 2013, who also visited Switzerland, Monetenegro and the Vatican at the same time.

== Diplomatic missions ==
Italy's

- Bangkok (Embassy)
- Chiang Mai (Consulate-General)

Thailand's

- Rome (Embassy)

== Culture ==
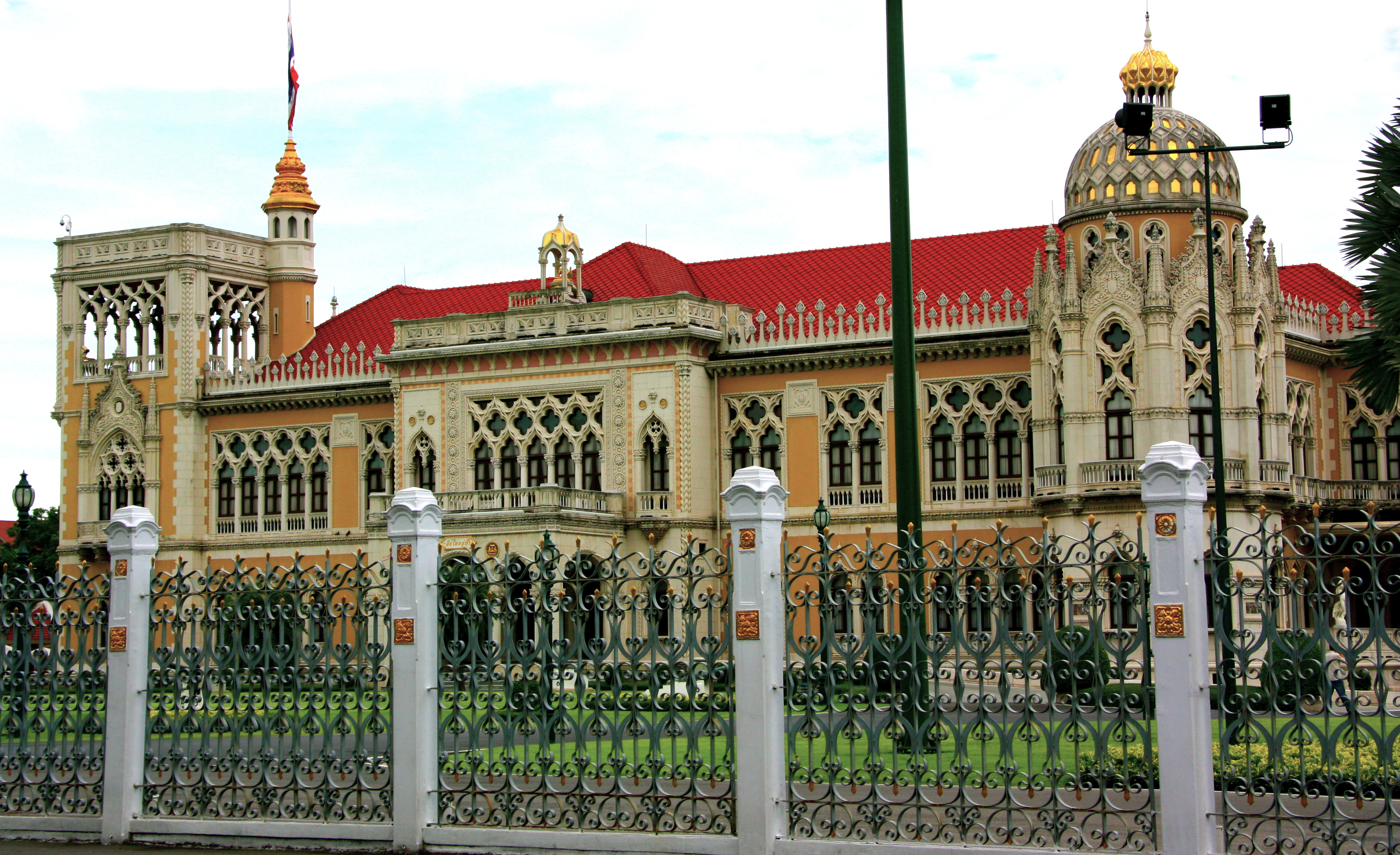
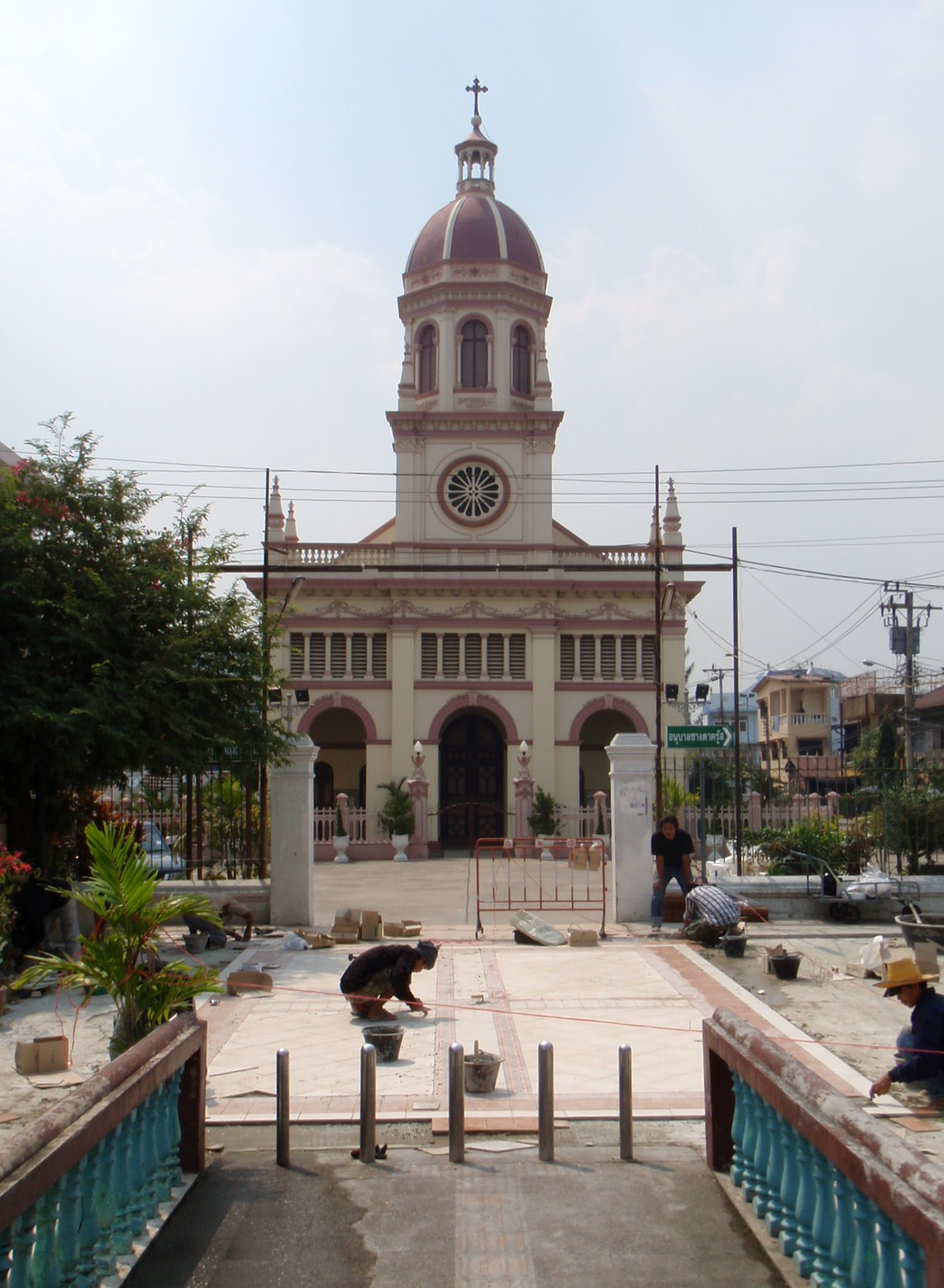
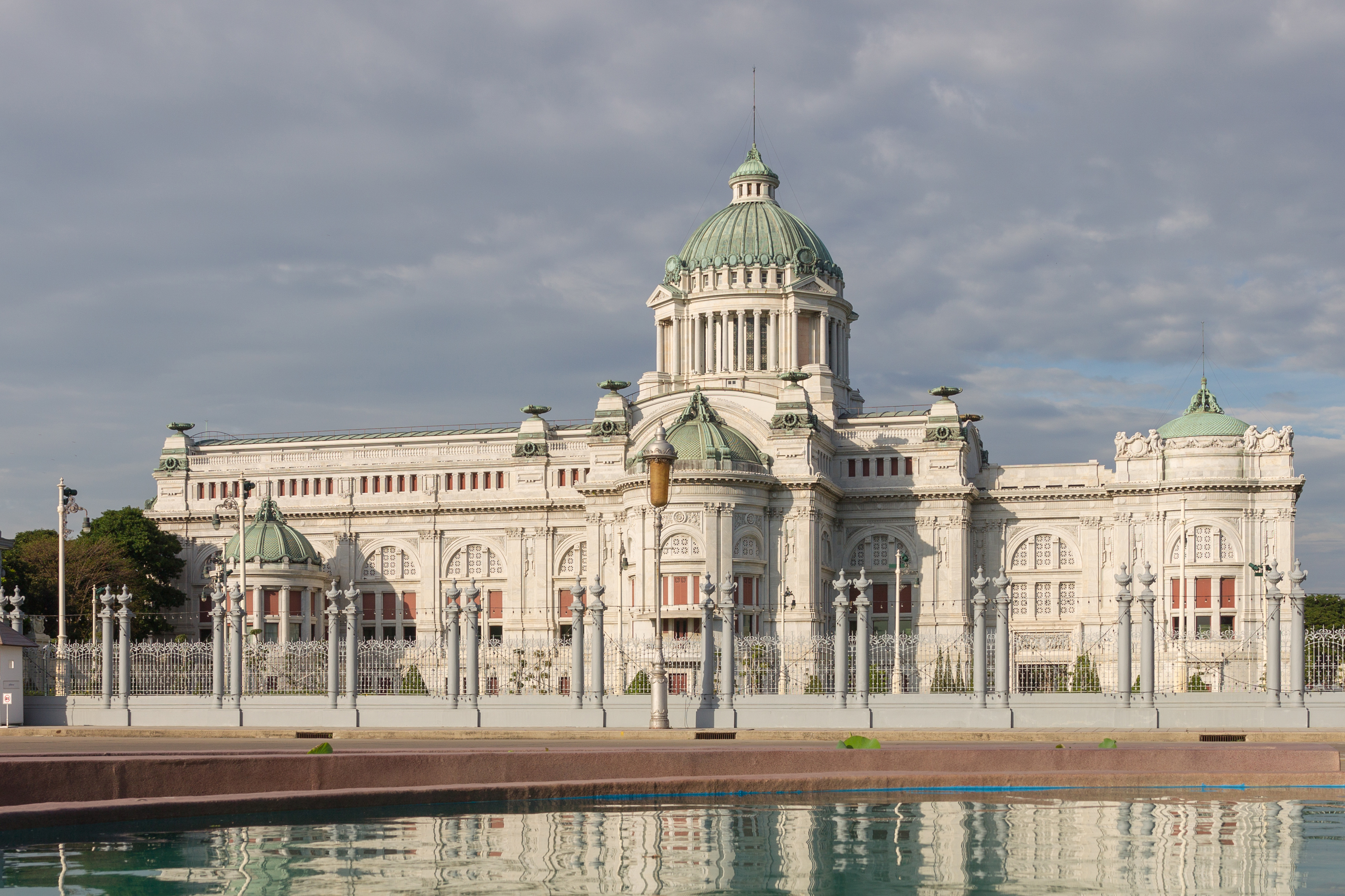
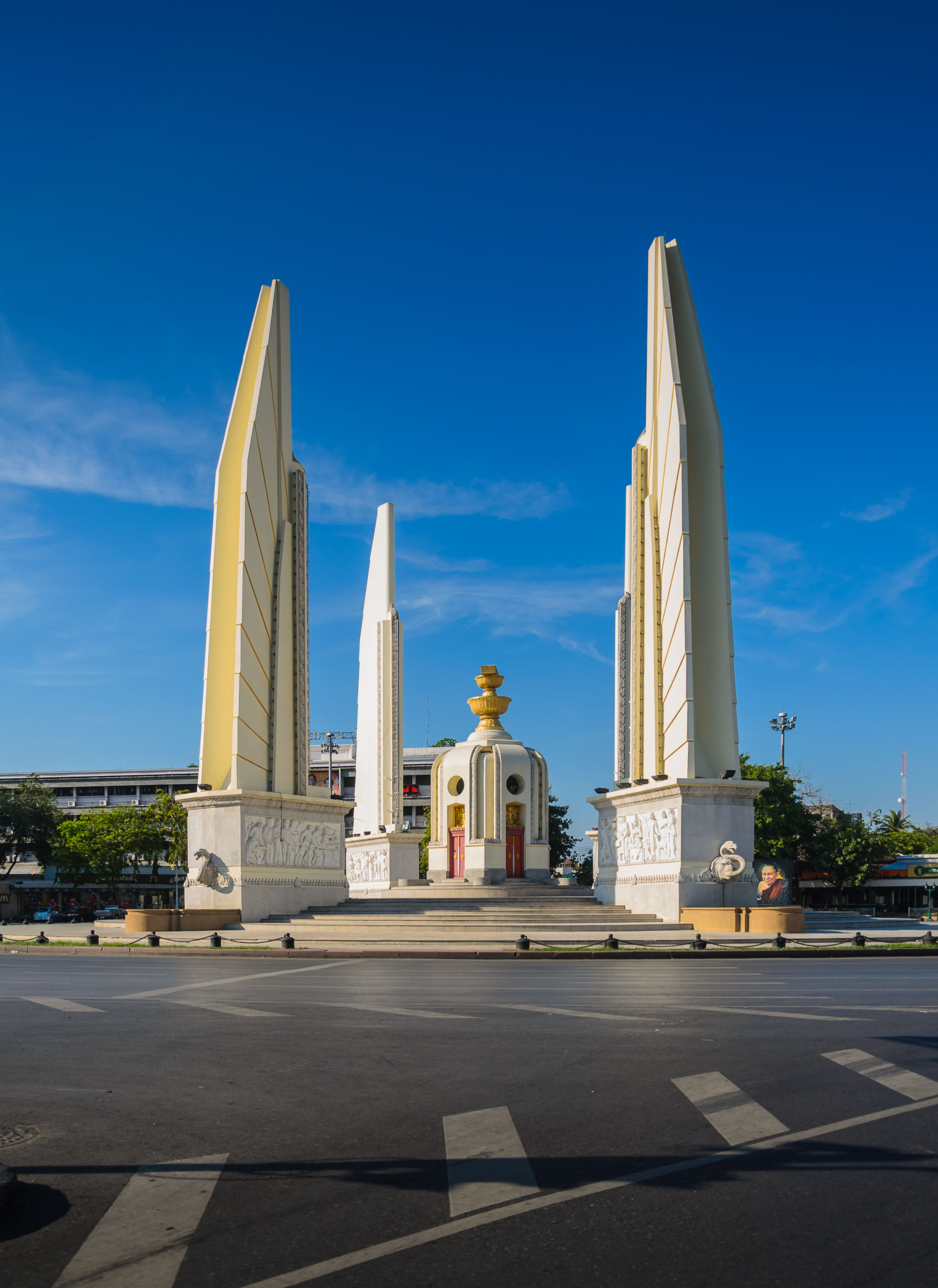
Clockwise from upper left: Government House, Santa Cruz Church, Ananta Samakhom Throne Hall, and the Democracy Monument

The Italian language is taught at Chulalongkorn and Thammasat universities, while Thai is taught in Ca' Foscari University in Venice.

=== Art ===
During the reign of King Chulalongkron and Vajiravudh, many Italian architects were employed to carry out major construction projects in Bangkok. When in 1889, the Department of Public Works was established by Chulalongkorn, the department was mainly staffed by Europeans, mostly Italians.

The Government House of Thailand for instance, was initially designed by Annibale Rigotti in 1923. When it became the prime minister's office in 1941, Corrado Feroci and Ercole Manfredi were employed to complete the building's construction. The design of the façade resembles the Ca' d'Oro Palazzo in Venice. The Ananta Samakhom Throne Hall commissioned in 1908 was built in renaissance and neoclassical architecture; designed by Mario Tamagno and Rigotti; and engineered by Carlo Allegri and G.E. Gollo. Marble sourced from Carrara was also used, with marble works being done by Vittorio Novi and his nephew Rudolfo Nolli. Carrara marble was also used during the construction of Wat Benchamabophit. Other notable buildings include Siam Commercial Bank's first permanent office, the Talat Noi Branch, which was designed by Rigotti in a Beaux-Arts style. The Hua Lamphong Railway Station built between 1910 and 1916 was designed by Tamagno and based on other European railway stations such as the Torino Porta Nuova railway station.

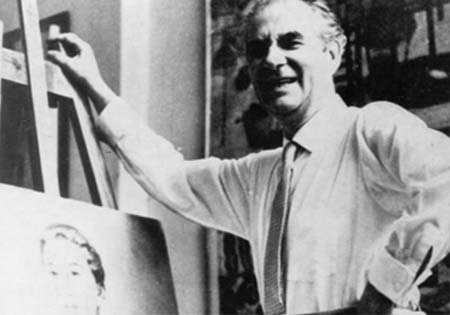
Silpa Bhirasri in his Bangkok studio

One of the most significant Italian artists in Thailand was Corrado Feroci, who later became a Thai citizen under the name Silpa Bhirasri. He arrived in Siam in 1923 to train artists and craftsman. He was later asked by the government to plan the curriculum and textbooks, and became instrumental in the early years of Silpakorn University. Notable monuments designed by Silpa include the Democracy monument, Victory monument, the statue of King Taksin at Wongwian Yai, and the statue of Gautama Buddha at Phutthamonthon. He is sometimes regarded as the 'Father of modern Thai art'.

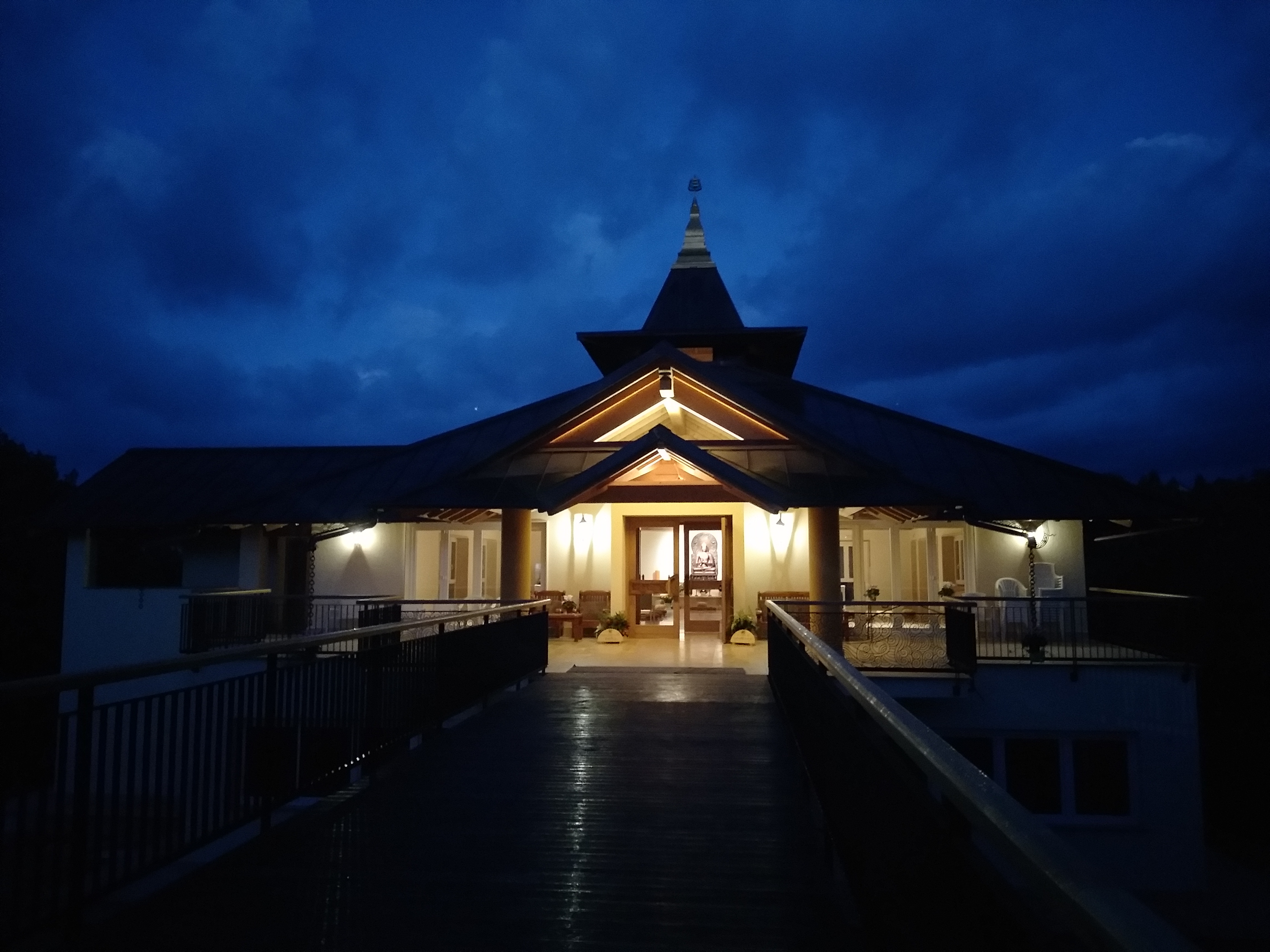
The Santacittārāma Buddhist Monastery near Rome, 2018

Italian architecture is also prominent outside of Bangkok, such as in Isan. In the early 1900s, Catholic Vietnamese migrants built several churches and homes in French and Italian architectural styles, such as in Tha Rae in Sakon Nakhon province. In Nakhon Ratchasima province near Khao Yai National Park, is the tourist attraction Primo Piazza, which is a small village built in Tuscan themed architecture by Juladis and Primo Posto in 2010.

Thai architecture is less notable in Italy than Italian architecture is in Thailand. Examples of Thai architecture in Italy are the Imperial Spa in Milan and Brescia, as well as several Buddhist temples built in Thai styles. One of them is the Santacittārāma Buddhist Monastery established in 1990 near Rome as part of the Thai Forest Tradition of Theravada Buddhism.

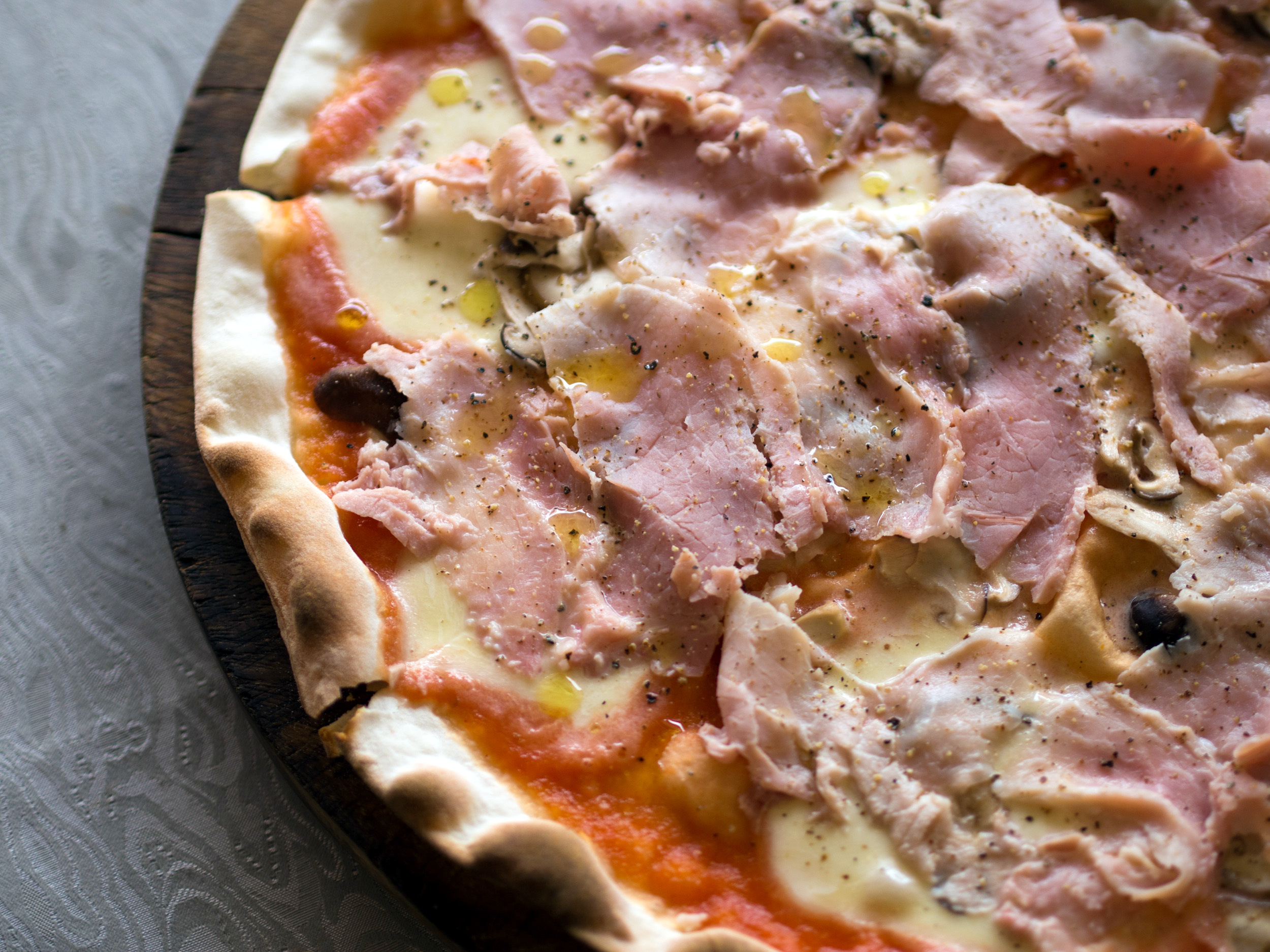
Pizza served at the Italian La Lanterna Di Genova restaurant in Chiang Mai, 2014.

=== Food ===
In 2019, the secretary general of the Thai-Italian Chamber of Commerce, Michele Tomea, said that there were 1,000 Italian restaurants in Thailand, with 200 of them being in Bangkok. In 2023, the Thai trade representative Nalinee Taveesin stated that there were in Thailand more Italian eateries than Italian people.

=== Music ===
Notable Thai-Italian singers include pop singer Valentina Giardullo (known as Valentina Ploy), who is based in Bangkok but grew up in Sorrento. She had been a contestant in X Factor Italia, and on The Voice Thailand in 2017, and a 2nd runners-up in Miss Universe Thailand 2018.

Jacopo Gianninoto is an Italian musician living mainly in Bangkok, where he also directs Baroque Musike Bangkok with Alberto Firrincieli. The ensemble has played classical music in Southeast Asia since at least 2015. The Thailand Philharmonic Orchestra has also cooporated with Italian composers in concerts where Thai and European instruments are played together.

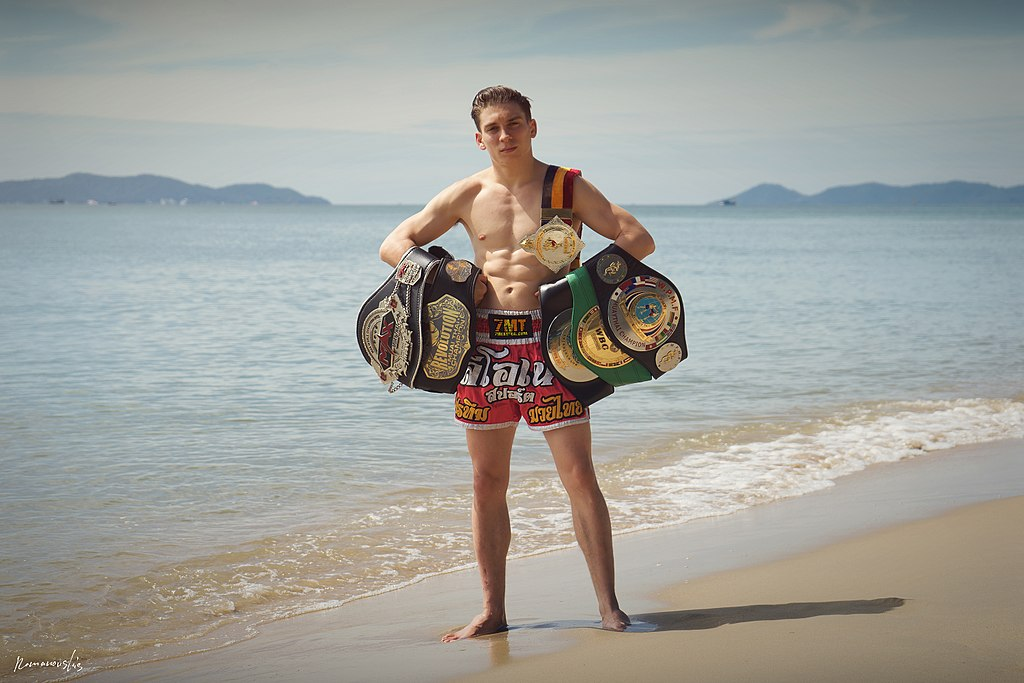
Mathias Gallo Cassarino with his Muay Thai belts

=== Sports ===
The sport Muay Thai has a presence in Italy. In June 2023, World Boxing Council Muaythai held a Muay Thai competition in Venice. In the 2023 European Games, Italy came 10th with a silver medal in the Muay Thai tournament. Notable Italian Muay Thai fighters include Annalisa Bucci, Mathias Gallo Cassarino, Joseph Lasiri, Martine Michieletto, and Alessandro Riguccini.

Marco Ballini, who was born in Bologna to an Italian father and Thai mother, is a footballer who plays for Chiangrai United F.C. Other Italian-Thai footballers include siblings Antonio and Gionata Verzura. Karen and Mark Chanloung are Italian-Thai dual citizen cross-country skiers who have competed for both Italy and Thailand. They both also competed for Thailand at the 2017 Asian Winter Games, 2018 Winter Olympics, and 2022 Winter Olympics. Another Italian-Thai skier is Nicola Zanon, who competed for Thailand at the 2018 Winter Olympics. Thailand's first athlete to win a medal at a Winter Olympic event was Italian born bobsledder Agnese Campeol at the 2024 Winter Youth Olympics.

== See also ==
- Foreign relations of Italy
- Foreign relations of Thailand
