= Thailand at the Olympics =

- IOC code: THA
- NOC: National Olympic Committee of Thailand
- Website: www.olympicthai.org (in Thai and English)
- Medals Ranked 54th: Gold 11 Silver 11 Bronze 19 Total 41

Summer appearances
- 1952; 1956; 1960; 1964; 1968; 1972; 1976; 1980; 1984; 1988; 1992; 1996; 2000; 2004; 2008; 2012; 2016; 2020; 2024; 2028

Winter appearances
- 2002; 2006; 2010; 2014; 2018; 2022; 2026

Thailand first participated at the Olympic Games in 1952, and has sent athletes to compete in every Summer Olympic Games since then, except when they participated in the US-led boycott of the 1980 Summer Olympics. Thailand has also participated in the Winter Olympic Games since 2002 except in 2010.

The National Olympic Committee of Thailand (NOCT), under the patronage of the King, was created in 1948 and recognized in 1950.

Thailand won its first medal at the 1976 Games in Montreal, when boxer Payao Poontarat took home a bronze in the men's light flyweight category. Thailand's first gold medal would also come in boxing at the 1996 Games in Atlanta, when Somluck Kamsing won the men's featherweight category. Since then, Thai athletes have won gold medals at every subsequent Summer Olympics with the exception of the 2012 Games in London, with all its gold medals to date having come in men's boxing, women's weightlifting and women's taekwondo. The country's most recent gold medalist is Panipak Wongpattanakit, who earned her medal in the women's 49kg event in taekwondo.

As of 2024, Thai athletes have won a total of 41 medals; 17 in weightlifting, 16 in boxing, 7 in taekwondo, and 1 in badminton. Among countries in Southeast Asia, Thailand ranks first in terms of both the number of gold medals (11) and the number of overall medals (41). Thailand's most successful Games to date were the 2004 Games in Athens, where they won eight medals, of which three of them were gold.

== Medal tables ==
=== Medals by Summer Games ===
Games	Athletes	Gold	Silver	Bronze	Total	Rank
1952 Helsinki	8	0	0	0	0	−
1956 Melbourne	35	0	0	0	0	−
1960 Rome	20	0	0	0	0	−
1964 Tokyo	54	0	0	0	0	−
1968 Mexico City	41	0	0	0	0	−
1972 Munich	33	0	0	0	0	−
1976 Montreal	42	0	0	1	1	37
1980 Moscow	boycotted					
1984 Los Angeles	35	0	1	0	1	33
1988 Seoul	14	0	0	1	1	46
1992 Barcelona	46	0	0	1	1	54
1996 Atlanta	37	1	0	1	2	47
2000 Sydney	52	1	0	2	3	47
2004 Athens	42	3	1	4	8	25
2008 Beijing	47	2	2	2	6	31
2012 London	37	0	2	2	4	59
2016 Rio de Janeiro	54	2	2	2	6	35
2020 Tokyo	41	1	0	1	2	59
2024 Paris	51	1	3	2	6	44
2028 Los Angeles	future event					
2032 Brisbane	future event					
Total		11	11	19	41	54

=== Medals by Winter Games ===
Games	Athletes	Gold	Silver	Bronze	Total	Rank
2002 Salt Lake City	1	0	0	0	0	−
2006 Turin	1	0	0	0	0	−
2010 Vancouver	did not participate					
2014 Sochi	2	0	0	0	0	−
2018 Pyeongchang	4	0	0	0	0	−
2022 Beijing	4	0	0	0	0	−
2026 Milano Cortina	3	0	0	0	0	−
2030 French Alps	future event					
2034 Utah	future event					
Total		0	0	0	0	−

=== Medals by summer sport ===
Sport	Gold	Silver	Bronze	Total
Weightlifting	5	4	8	17
Boxing	4	4	8	16
Taekwondo	2	2	3	7
Badminton	0	1	0	1
Totals (4 entries)	11	11	19	41

== List of medalists ==
=== Medalists by Summer Games ===
Medal	Name	Games	Sport	Event
Bronze	Payao Poontarat	1976 Montreal	Boxing	Men's light flyweight
Silver	Dhawee Umponmaha	1984 Los Angeles	Boxing	Men's light welterweight
Bronze	Phajol Moolsan	1988 Seoul	Boxing	Men's bantamweight
Bronze	Arkhom Chenglai	1992 Barcelona	Boxing	Men's welterweight
Gold	Somluck Kamsing	1996 Atlanta	Boxing	Men's featherweight
Bronze	Vichairachanon Khadpo	1996 Atlanta	Boxing	Men's bantamweight
Gold	Wijan Ponlid	2000 Sydney	Boxing	Men's flyweight
Bronze	Pornchai Thongburan	2000 Sydney	Boxing	Men's light middleweight
Bronze	Khassaraporn Suta	2000 Sydney	Weightlifting	Women's 58 kg
Gold	Manus Boonjumnong	2004 Athens	Boxing	Men's light welterweight
Gold	Udomporn Polsak	2004 Athens	Weightlifting	Women's 53 kg
Gold	Pawina Thongsuk	2004 Athens	Weightlifting	Women's 75 kg
Silver	Worapoj Petchkoom	2004 Athens	Boxing	Men's bantamweight
Bronze	Suriya Prasathinphimai	2004 Athens	Boxing	Men's middleweight
Bronze	Yaowapa Boorapolchai	2004 Athens	Taekwondo	Women's 49 kg
Bronze	Aree Wiratthaworn	2004 Athens	Weightlifting	Women's 48 kg
Bronze	Wandee Kameaim	2004 Athens	Weightlifting	Women's 58 kg
Gold	Somjit Jongjohor	2008 Beijing	Boxing	Men's flyweight
Gold	Prapawadee Jaroenrattanatarakoon	2008 Beijing	Weightlifting	Women's 53 kg
Silver	Manus Boonjumnong	2008 Beijing	Boxing	Men's light welterweight
Silver	Buttree Puedpong	2008 Beijing	Taekwondo	Women's 49 kg
Bronze	Pensiri Laosirikul	2008 Beijing	Weightlifting	Women's 48 kg
Bronze	Wandee Kameaim	2008 Beijing	Weightlifting	Women's 58 kg
Silver	Kaeo Pongprayoon	2012 London	Boxing	Men's light flyweight
Silver	Pimsiri Sirikaew	2012 London	Weightlifting	Women's 58 kg
Bronze	Chanatip Sonkham	2012 London	Taekwondo	Women's 49 kg
Bronze	Rattikan Gulnoi	2012 London	Weightlifting	Women's 58 kg
Gold	Sopita Tanasan	2016 Rio de Janeiro	Weightlifting	Women's 48 kg
Gold	Sukanya Srisurat	2016 Rio de Janeiro	Weightlifting	Women's 58 kg
Silver	Tawin Hanprab	2016 Rio de Janeiro	Taekwondo	Men's 58 kg
Silver	Pimsiri Sirikaew	2016 Rio de Janeiro	Weightlifting	Women's 58 kg
Bronze	Panipak Wongpattanakit	2016 Rio de Janeiro	Taekwondo	Women's 49 kg
Bronze	Sinphet Kruaithong	2016 Rio de Janeiro	Weightlifting	Men's 56 kg
Gold	Panipak Wongpattanakit	2020 Tokyo	Taekwondo	Women's 49 kg
Bronze	Sudaporn Seesondee	2020 Tokyo	Boxing	Women's lightweight
Gold	Panipak Wongpattanakit	2024 Paris	Taekwondo	Women's 49 kg
Silver	Kunlavut Vitidsarn	2024 Paris	Badminton	Men's singles
Silver	Theerapong Silachai	2024 Paris	Weightlifting	Men's 61 kg
Silver	Weeraphon Wichuma	2024 Paris	Weightlifting	Men's 73 kg
Bronze	Janjaem Suwannapheng	2024 Paris	Boxing	Women's Welterweight
Bronze	Surodchana Khambao	2024 Paris	Weightlifting	Women's 49 kg

=== Medals by individual ===
According to official data of the International Olympic Committee, this is a list of people who have won two or more Olympic medals for Thailand.

Athlete	Sport	Years	Games	Gender	1st place, gold medalist(s)	2nd place, silver medalist(s)	3rd place, bronze medalist(s)	Total
Panipak Wongpattanakit	Taekwondo	2016–2024	Summer	Women	2	0	1	3
Manus Boonjumnong	Boxing	2004–2008	Summer	Men	1	1	0	2
Pimsiri Sirikaew	Weightlifting	2012–2016	Summer	Women	0	2	0	2
Wandee Kameaim	Weightlifting	2004–2008	Summer	Women	0	0	2	2

- **People in bold** are still active competitors

== Flag bearers ==
=== Flag bearers by Summer Games ===
Games	Flag bearer	Sport
1952 Helsinki		
1956 Melbourne		
1960 Rome		
1964 Tokyo		
1968 Mexico City		
1972 Munich	Rangsit Yanothai	Shooting
1976 Montreal		
1980 Moscow	did not participate	
1984 Los Angeles	Rangsit Yanothai	Shooting
1988 Seoul	Somchai Chanthavanij	Shooting
1992 Barcelona	Sompol Kukasemkij	Badminton
1996 Atlanta	Vissanu Sophanich	Athletics
2000 Sydney	Somluck Kamsing	Boxing
2004 Athens	Paradorn Srichaphan	Tennis
2008 Beijing	Worapoj Petchkoom	Boxing
2012 London	Nuttapong Ketin	Swimming
2016 Rio de Janeiro	Ratchanok Intanon	Badminton
2020 Tokyo	Naphaswan Yangpaiboon; Savate Sresthaporn	Shooting
2024 Paris	Puripol Boonson; Vareeraya Sukasem	Athletics; Skateboarding

=== Flag bearers by Winter Games ===
Games	Flag bearer	Sport
2002 Salt Lake City	Prawat Nagvajara	Cross-country skiing
2006 Turin	Prawat Nagvajara	Cross-country skiing
2010 Vancouver	did not participate	
2014 Sochi	Kanes Sucharitakul	Alpine skiing
2018 Pyeongchang	Mark Chanloung	Cross-country skiing
2022 Beijing	Karen Chanloung; Nicola Zanon	Cross-country skiing Alpine skiing

== Olympic participants ==
=== Summer Olympics ===
Sport	(Finland) 1952	(Australia) 1956	(Italy) 1960	(Japan) 1964	(Mexico) 1968	(Germany) 1972	(Canada) 1976	(United States) 1984	(South Korea) 1988	(Spain) 1992	(United States) 1996	(Australia) 2000	(Greece) 2004	(China) 2008	(United Kingdom) 2012	(Brazil) 2016	(Japan) 2020	(France) 2024	(United States) 2028
Archery							3	2							1	1			
Athletics	8	8	8	18		4	4	10	4	18	8	12	3	11	2	4	2	2	
Badminton										8	7	6	8	4	6	7	7	9	
Basketball		9																	
Boxing		5	4	5	3	7	5	5	6	6	6	9	6	8	3	5	4	8	
Canoeing															1		1		
Cycling				8	7	7	6							1	1	2	2	4	
Diving							1				2	2							
Equestrian													1		1		3	1	
Fencing							5						2	2					
Football		11			17														
Golf																4	4	4	
Judo				3		1	1			2	1				1	1	1	1	
Modern pentathlon																		1	
Rowing												1	1		1	2	2	1	
Sailing		2	2	4	1	3	2	1	1	2	1	3	1	2	3	4	3	4	
Shooting			6	10	11	10	12	17	3	2	3	2	2	5	4	5	6	3	
Skateboarding																		1	
Swimming				2			2			5	6	8	6	2	2	2	2	2	
Table tennis												1	1	1	1	3	2	3	
Taekwondo													4	3	3	3	2	3	
Tennis										2	2	3	2	1		2			
Volleyball																			12
Weightlifting				4	2	1	1			1	1	5	5	7	7	9		4	
Total	8	35	20	54	41	33	42	35	14	46	37	52	42	47	37	54	41	51	12

=== Winter Olympics ===
Sport	(United States) 2002	(Italy) 2006	(Russia) 2014	(South Korea) 2018	(China) 2022	(Italy) 2026
Alpine skiing			2	2	2	1
Cross-country skiing	1	1		2	2	2
Total	1	1	2	4	4	3

== Milestones ==
- In 2002 and 2006, Thailand qualified its first Winter Olympian cross country skier, and first Winter Olympian, Prawat Nagvajara.
- In 2014, Thailand qualified its first Winter Olympian alpine skier, Kanes Sucharitakul. It then added the first female Winter Olympian for the country, Vanessa Vanakorn (Vanessa-Mae), doubling the size of the previous largest delegation to a Winter Games.

== See also ==
- Tropical nations at the Winter Olympics

- Olympics
  - Thailand at the Youth Olympics
- Paralympic
  - Thailand at the Paralympics
- Asian Games
  - Thailand at the Asian Games
  - Thailand at the Asian Para Games
- Other
  - Thailand at the Universiade
  - Thailand at the World Games
