= Thailand at the 2026 Winter Olympics =

- Flag of Thailand
- IOC code: THA
- NOC: National Olympic Committee of Thailand
- Website: www.olympicthai.org (in Thai and English)

in Milan and Cortina d'Ampezzo, Italy 6 February 2026 – 22 February 2026
- Competitors: 3 (2 men and 1 woman) in 2 sports
- Flag bearers (opening): Mark Chanloung & Karen Chanloung
- Flag bearers (closing): Mark Chanloung & Karen Chanloung
- Medals: Gold 0 Silver 0 Bronze 0 Total 0

Winter Olympics appearances (overview)
- 2002; 2006; 2010; 2014; 2018; 2022; 2026

Thailand competed at the 2026 Winter Olympics in Milan and Cortina d'Ampezzo, Italy, from 6 to 22 February 2026.

Cross-country skiers Mark Chanloung and Karen Chanloung were the country's flagbearer during the opening ceremony. The Chanloung's were also the country's flagbearer during the closing ceremony.

== Competitors ==
The following is the list of number of competitors participating at the Games per sport/discipline.

Sport	Men	Women	Total
Alpine skiing	1	0	1
Cross-country skiing	1	1	2
Total	2	1	3

== Alpine skiing ==
Thailand qualified one male alpine skier through the basic quota.

Athlete	Event	Run 1		Run 2		Total	
Athlete	Event	Time	Rank	Time	Rank	Time	Rank
Fabian Wiest	Men's giant slalom	1:28.85	62	1:21.96	60	2:50.81	60
Fabian Wiest	Men's slalom	DNF					

== Cross-country skiing ==
Following the completion of the 2024–25 FIS Cross-Country World Cup, Thailand qualified further one male athlete. Following the completion of the 2025–26 FIS Cross-Country World Cup in the first World Cup period (28 November – 14 December 2025), Thailand qualified a further one female athlete.

Distance

Athlete	Event	Classical		Freestyle		Final		
Athlete	Event	Time	Rank	Time	Rank	Time	Deficit	Rank
Mark Chanloung	Men's skiathlon	29:22.2	72	LAP				71
Mark Chanloung	Men's 10 km freestyle	—N/a		24:42.8	77	—N/a		
Mark Chanloung	Men's 50 km classical	LAP	52	—N/a				
Karen Chanloung	Women's 10 km freestyle	—N/a		28:39.7	84	—N/a		

Sprint

Athlete	Event	Qualification		Quarterfinal		Semifinal		Final	
Athlete	Event	Time	Rank	Time	Rank	Time	Rank	Time	Rank
Mark Chanloung	Men's sprint	3:35.71	69	Did not advance					
