= Ski and Snowboard Association of Thailand =

Thai sport governing body

The Ski and Snowboard Association of Thailand (SSAT; Thai: สมาคมกีฬาสกีและสโนว์บอร์ดแห่งประเทศไทย) is the country's national governing body of skiing, snowboarding, bobsleigh and skeleton. It was founded in 2016, and is a member of the International Ski and Snowboard Federation, the International Ski Mountaineering Federation, the International Bobsleigh and Skeleton Federation, the International Biathlon Union, and the International Luge Federation.

== History ==
As a tropical country where it never snows, Thailand's climate is not suited for winter sports. However, skiing and snowboarding is pursued by some Thais living or travelling overseas. The association was founded as a non-sanctioned body in January 2016 by a group of such enthusiasts, with Piyasvasti Amranand—better known as an energy-policy technocrat—as its first president. Sueb Tarasiri serves as its secretary-general.

Although their original goal was simply to promote the sports among Thais, the association soon received enquiries about representation in international competitions, and its activities were expanded in order to serve as a governing body. The association was registered with the Sports Authority of Thailand (SAT) as a national sports association in September 2016, after working to have the sports recognized by the SAT, which also enabled it to receive sports funding and tax-deductible sponsorships.

Thailand had previously participated in the Winter Olympics, with a skier first representing the country in 2002, but those applications were made directly by the athletes themselves via the National Olympic Committee, as the country did not then have a recognized governing body for the sport. The SSAT took over responsibility for fielding the skiing national team, first for the 2017 Asian Winter Games in Hokkaido, then the 2018 Winter Olympics in Pyeongchang.

The association's first teams consisted of half-Thai dual nationals who grew up overseas. In response to criticism of the fact, the SSAT launched a programme to create home-grown snow-sport athletes. In 2018, it began holding roller-skiing events—as a warm-weather alternative to cross-country skiing—in several provinces, including Chumphon, where a local roller-skiing movement already existed thanks to promotion by Norwegian expatriate Karl Fred Kristensen. It actively promoted the sport, which saw increasing participation and was introduced as a discipline in the 47th National Games in 2022.

From its roller-skiing competitions, the SSAT recruited young athletes to train for the Winter Youth Olympics, and fielded a cross-country and alpine skiing team of four at Lausanne 2020, Thailand's first time at the games. For Gangwon 2024, Thailand, along with several other countries without snow, also received assistance from host country South Korea's New Horizons programme, which provided training facilities and coaching in the lead-up to the games. The SSAT fielded 18 athletes in 2024, including debuts in biathlon, bobsleigh, freestyle skiing, luge, skeleton and snowboarding. Agnese Campeol, who began training in 2022 with the SSAT, won silver in the women's monobob event—the first medal for Thailand in the winter edition of either the Olympics or Youth Olympics.
