= Prawat =

Prawat (Thai: ประวัติ, pronounced [prā.wàt]; via Pali: pavatti) is a masculine given name. Notable men with the given name include:

- Prawat Nagvajara (born 1958), Thai academic and cross-country skier
- Prawat Wahoram (born 1981), Thai wheelchair racer
