= Thailand at the 2028 Summer Olympics =

- IOC code: THA
- NOC: National Olympic Committee of Thailand
- Website: www.olympicthai.org

in Los Angeles, United States 14 July 2028 – 30 July 2028
- Competitors: 13 in 2 sports
- Medals: Gold 0 Silver 0 Bronze 0 Total 0

Summer Olympics appearances (overview)
- 1952; 1956; 1960; 1964; 1968; 1972; 1976; 1980; 1984; 1988; 1992; 1996; 2000; 2004; 2008; 2012; 2016; 2020; 2024; 2028

Thailand is scheduled to compete at the 2028 Summer Olympics in Los Angeles, from 14 to 30 July 2028. Since making its Olympic debut at Helsinki 1952, Thailand has participated in every Summer Olympics except Moscow 1980, which it boycotted.

== Competitors ==
The following is the list of number of competitors in the Games.

Sport	Men	Women	Total
Sailing	0	1	1
Volleyball	0	12	12
Total	0	13	13

== Sailing ==
Thai sailor secured an Olympic quota by winning the event at the 2026 Asian Games in Aichi-Nagoya, Japan.

Medal race events

Athlete	Event	Race										Net points	Final rank
Athlete	Event	1	2	3	4	5	6	7	8	9	M*	Net points	Final rank
Sophia Montgomery	Women's ILCA 6												

== Volleyball ==
Thailand women's team secured qualification for the Games by winning the competition and claiming the direct Asian qualification at the 2026 AVC Women's Volleyball Continental Championship in Tianjin, China, marked their Olympic debut.

Team	Event	Group stage				Quarterfinal	Semifinal	Final / BM	
Team	Event	Opposition Score	Opposition Score	Opposition Score	Rank	Opposition Score	Opposition Score	Opposition Score	Rank
Thailand women's	Women's tournament								
