= Thailand at the 2014 Winter Olympics =

- IOC code: THA
- NOC: National Olympic Committee of Thailand

in Sochi
- Competitors: 2 in 1 sport
- Flag bearers: Kanes Sucharitakul (opening and closing)
- Medals: Gold 0 Silver 0 Bronze 0 Total 0

Winter Olympics appearances (overview)
- 2002; 2006; 2010; 2014; 2018; 2022; 2026

Thailand competed at the 2014 Winter Olympics in Sochi, Russia from 7 to 23 February 2014. The Thai team consisted of two athletes, Vanessa Vanakorn and Kanes Sucharitakul, both competing in alpine skiing. This was Thailand's third appearance at a Winter Olympic Games, and their first since 2006, having missed the 2010 Winter Olympics in Vancouver, British Columbia, Canada.

== Background ==
Thailand first joined Olympic competition at the 1952 Summer Olympics in Helsinki and have participated in every Summer Olympics since, except the boycotted 1980 Summer Olympics. Therefore, the 2014 Games also marked the first time the Thai Olympic team competed in Russia.

Their first appearance in the Winter Olympic Games came at the 2002 Winter Olympics. Thailand participated in 2006, but missed the 2010 Winter Olympics, making Sochi their third Winter Olympics participation. The only winter sport Thailand had previously competed in was cross-country skiing. The Thai team to Sochi consisted of two athletes, Vanessa Vanakorn and Kanes Sucharitakul, both competing in alpine skiing. Sucharitakul was selected as the flag bearer for both the opening ceremony and closing ceremony.

== Alpine skiing ==
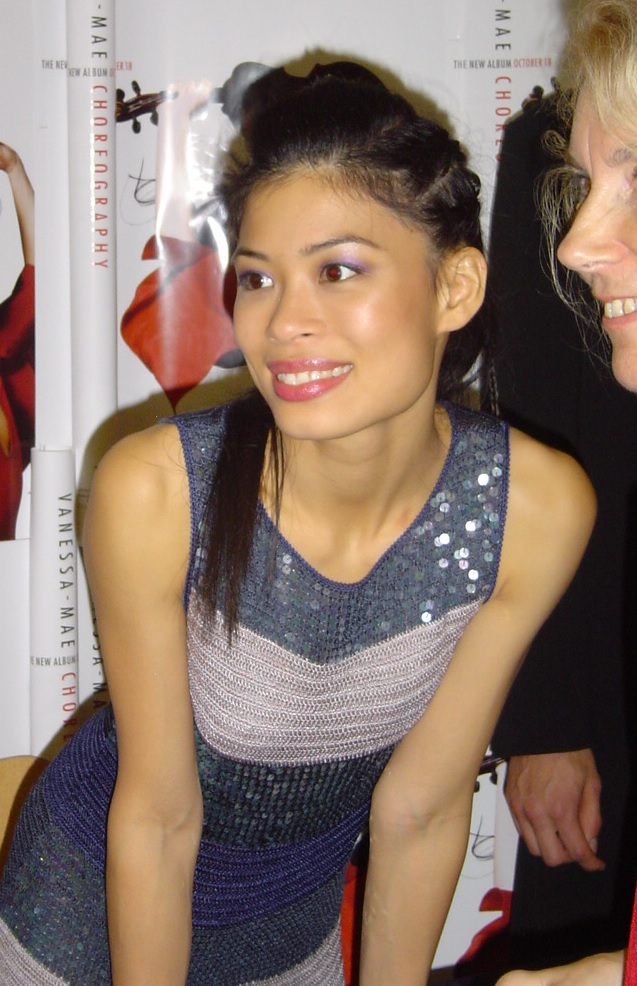
Vanessa Vanakorn, better known as Vanessa-Mae, made her Olympic debut in Sochi.

According to the final quota allocation released on January 20, 2014, Thailand had two athletes (one male and one female) in qualification position. Thailand had two male athletes that met the standard, and chose to send the one that was born in Thailand and had qualified for more events. Kanes Sucharitakul was 21 years old at the time of the Sochi Olympics. On 19 February Sucharitakul participated in the giant slalom, he competed his runs in 1 minute and 37.82 seconds and 1 minute and 37.24 seconds. His total time of 3 minutes and 15 seconds put him in 65th position, out of 72 athletes who completed the race. On 22 February he did not complete the first run of the slalom race.

Vanessa Vanakorn, a classical violinist who performs under the name Vanessa-Mae, and whose father is from Thailand, also competed for the country under her father's last name. She was 35 years old at the time of these Games. Vanakorn qualified on the last day of qualification by her results in a series of four races in Slovenia. The International Ski Federation (FIS) subsequently determined that those races were rigged to give her the number of FIS points necessary to be able to take part in Sochi, but the Court of Arbitration for Sport (CAS) overturned the finding of the FIS, in part because it could not find to the CAS' satisfaction "evidence of any manipulation by Vanessa Vanakorn herself". The International Olympic Committee (IOC) subsequently confirmed Vanessa Vanakorn's Olympic result and on 24 February 2016, the FIS issued a public apology to Vanessa Vanakorn and made an "appropriate payment" to her for damages. On 18 February, Vanakorn competed in her only race, the giant slalom. She posted run times of 1 minute and 44.86 seconds and 1 minute and 42.11 seconds. Her combined time of 3 minutes and 26.97 seconds saw her finish in 67th position, last among the finishers, although 22 other athletes failed to complete the race. Her time was over 50 seconds behind the winner Tina Maze of Slovenia.

Athlete	Event	Run 1		Run 2		Total	
Athlete	Event	Time	Rank	Time	Rank	Time	Rank
Kanes Sucharitakul	Men's giant slalom	1:37.82	73	1:37.24	65	3:15.06	65
Kanes Sucharitakul	Men's slalom	DNF					
Vanessa Vanakorn	Women's giant slalom	1:44.86	74	1:42.11	67	3:26.97	67

== See also ==
- Thailand at the 2014 Asian Games
- Thailand at the 2014 Summer Youth Olympics
