= Thailand at the 2006 Winter Olympics =

- IOC code: THA
- NOC: National Olympic Committee of Thailand

in Turin
- Competitors: 1 in 1 sport
- Flag bearer: Prawat Nagvajara
- Medals: Gold 0 Silver 0 Bronze 0 Total 0

Winter Olympics appearances (overview)
- 2002; 2006; 2010; 2014; 2018; 2022; 2026

Thailand sent a delegation to compete at the 2006 Winter Olympics, in Turin, Italy from 10–26 February 2006. This was Thailand's second appearance at a Winter Olympic Games after the 2002 Winter Olympics. The Thai delegation consisted of one athlete, cross-country skier Prawat Nagvajara, who finished the 15 kilometre classical in 96th place.

== Background ==
Thailand first joined Olympic competition at the 1952 Summer Olympics in Helsinki, and excepting the boycotted 1980 Summer Olympics they have participated in every Summer Olympics since. The nation's only prior participation at the Winter Olympics had come four years prior in the Salt Lake City Olympics. The Thai delegation to Turin consisted of a single athlete, cross-county skier Prawat Nagvajara. He had previously been the country's only representative in Salt Lake City. Nagvajara was the flag bearer for the opening ceremony, while a volunteer carried the Thai flag for the closing ceremony.

== Cross-country skiing ==
Prawat Nagvajara, Thailand's lone competitor in Turin, was 47 years old at the time of these Olympics. On 17 February, he finished the men's 15 km classical in a time of 1 hour 7 minutes and 15 seconds. This made him the last of 96 men who finished the race, and he was 29 minutes behind the gold medalist, Andrus Veerpalu of Estonia.

Athlete	Event	Final	
Athlete	Event	Total	Rank
Prawat Nagvajara	Men's 15 km classical	1:07:15.9	96

== See also ==
- Thailand at the 2006 Asian Games
