= Thailand at the 2022 Winter Olympics =

- Flag of Thailand
- IOC code: THA
- NOC: National Olympic Committee of Thailand
- Website: www.olympicthai.or.th (in Thai and English)

in Beijing, China 4–20 February 2022
- Competitors: 4 (2 men and 2 women) in 2 sports
- Flag bearers (opening): Karen Chanloung; Nicola Zanon
- Flag bearer (closing): Volunteer
- Medals: Gold 0 Silver 0 Bronze 0 Total 0

Winter Olympics appearances (overview)
- 2002; 2006; 2010; 2014; 2018; 2022; 2026; 2030

Thailand competed at the 2022 Winter Olympics in Beijing, China, from 4 to 20 February 2022.

The Thai team consisted of two men and two women competing in two sports. Karen Chanloung and Nicola Zanon were the country's flagbearer during the opening ceremony. Meanwhile a volunteer was the flagbearer during the closing ceremony.

== Competitors ==
The following is the list of number of competitors participating at the Games per sport/discipline.

Sport	Men	Women	Total
Alpine skiing	1	1	2
Cross-country skiing	1	1	2
Total	2	2	4

== Alpine skiing ==
By meeting the basic qualification standards, Thailand has qualified one male and one female alpine skier.

Athlete	Event	Run 1		Run 2		Total	
Athlete	Event	Time	Rank	Time	Rank	Time	Rank
Nicola Zanon	Men's giant slalom	1:17.53	44	1:20.83	37	2:38.36	38
Nicola Zanon	Men's slalom	1:05.71	45	1:02.24	40	2:07.95	40
Mida Fah Jaiman	Women's giant slalom	DNF		Did not advance			
Mida Fah Jaiman	Women's slalom	DNF		Did not advance			

== Cross-country skiing ==
By meeting the basic qualification standards, Thailand has qualified one male and one female cross-country skier.

Distance

Athlete	Event	Classical		Freestyle		Final		
Athlete	Event	Time	Rank	Time	Rank	Time	Deficit	Rank
Mark Chanloung	Men's 30 km skiathlon	47:00.0	62	LAP				60
Mark Chanloung	Men's 50 km freestyle	—				1:20:11.5	+8:38.8	49
Karen Chanloung	Women's 10 km classical	—				33:14.0	+5:07.7	63

Sprint

Athlete	Event	Qualification		Quarterfinal		Semifinal		Final	
Athlete	Event	Time	Rank	Time	Rank	Time	Rank	Time	Rank
Karen Chanloung	Women's	3:36.00	61	Did not advance					

== See also ==
- Tropical nations at the Winter Olympics
