= Piyasvasti Amranand =

Thai politician

- ปิยสวัสดิ์ อัมระนันทน์
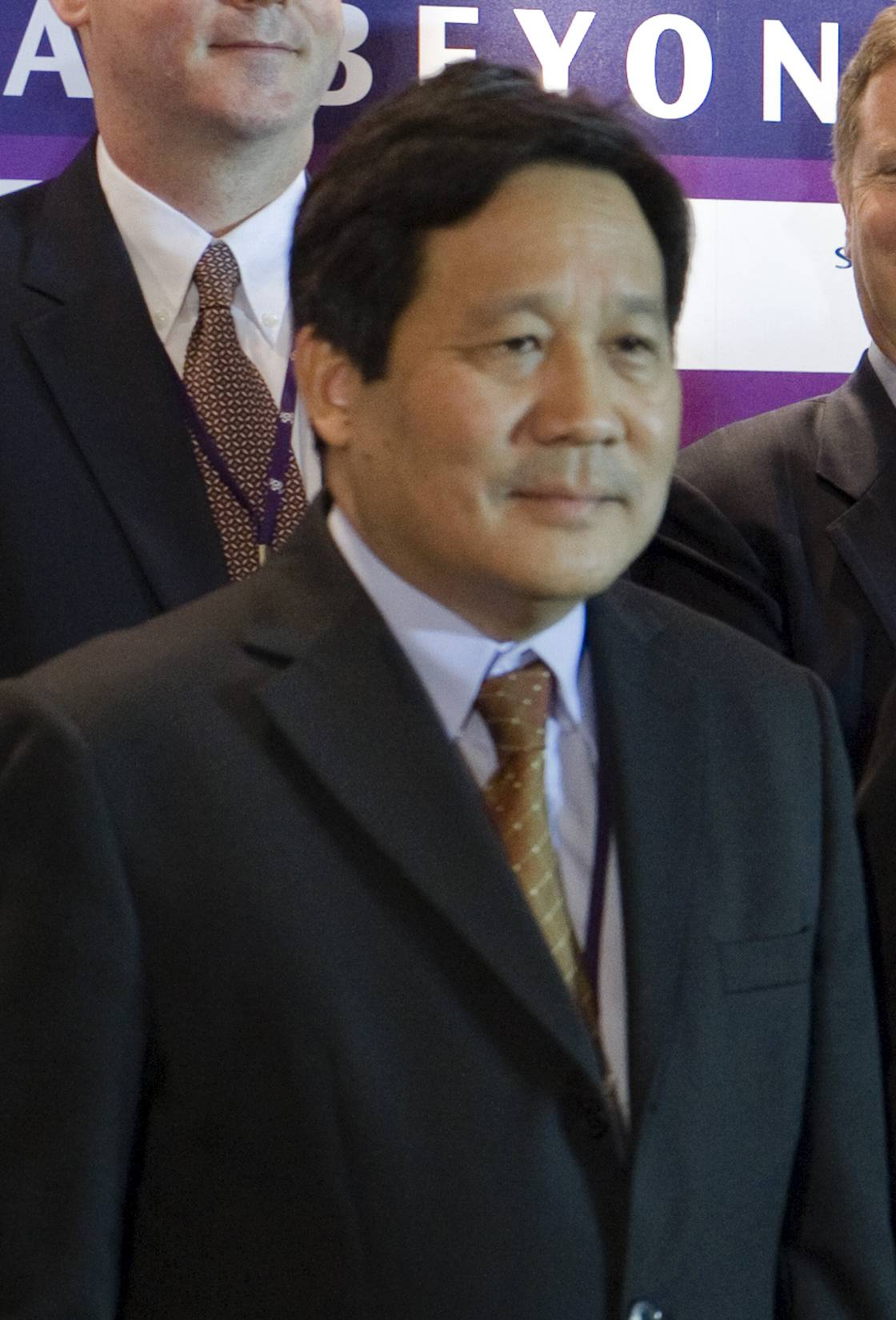
- Piyasvasti Amranand in 2010

Minister of Energy
- In office 9 October 2006 – 6 February 2008
- Prime Minister: Surayud Chulanont
- Preceded by: Wiset Chuphiban
- Succeeded by: Phunphirom Liptaphanlop

Personal details
- Born: 11 July 1953 (age 73) Bangkok, Thailand
- Spouse: Anik Amranand (née Wichiancharoen)
- Education: LSE, PhD, MSc; Oxford, BA
- Profession: CEO; politician

Piyasvasti Amranand (Thai: ปิยสวัสดิ์ อัมระนันทน์; RTGS: Piyasawat Ammaranan), born 11 July 1953) is a former Thailand's Energy Minister between 9 October 2006 and 6 February 2008. He is former Secretary-General of the Thai National Energy Policy Office, Chairman of Kasikorn Asset Management, and Chairman of the Panel of Advisors to the CEO of Kasikornbank. He was President of Thai Airways International between October 2009 and June 2012 and Chairman of PTT Public Company Limited between July 2014 and 2018. He is currently Chairman of PTT Global Chemical plc., board member of Kasikorn Bank, board member of Pruksa Holding plc., and Chairman of Thai Airways Rehabilitation Plan Administrator. Piyasvasti plays active roles in three non-profit organizations as a founding and core member of the Energy Reform for Sustainability Group (ERS); Chairman of the Energy for Environment Foundation, a non-profit organization undertaking renewable energy and energy efficiency projects; and as president of the Ski and Snowboard Association of Thailand.

== Career ==
During the 1990s, Piyasvasti played a key role in deregulating and privatizing a number of energy-related state enterprises like PTT and power generation business. During his term as energy minister he implemented wide-ranging reforms in the energy sector, for instance, the end of oil price subsidies and repayment of the oil fund's massive debt accrued by the previous government's subsidy program; implementation of aggressive policies to promote renewable energy (including biofuels), cogeneration and distributed generation; adoption of Euro 4 fuel qualities and introduction of vapour recovery systems for petrol stations; adoption of a number of standards and incentive programs for energy efficiency; awards of a large number of petroleum concessions, issuing of IPP solicitation; conclusion of a number of power purchase agreements for projects in Laos; establishment of a nuclear power program with a target for 4,000 MW of nuclear capacity in 2020-2021; and amendment of a number of energy-related laws.

The most important law passed during his term as energy minister was the Energy Industry Act to establish an independent regulatory body for electricity and natural gas. The law was responsible for saving PTT Public Co, Ltd. from being nationalized in a court case brought against the government and PTT by the Consumers Association.

Piyasvasti joined Thai Airways in October 2009 when the carrier was in financial trouble. He continued to implement the turnaround plan and introduced a long term strategic plan where the financial position of the company was substantially strengthened, embarked on the largest aircraft acquisition and retrofit program ever implemented at Thai Airways, and formed Thai Smile as a first step in competing with low cost airlines. In June 2012, the board of directors suddenly voted Piyasvasti out with no explanation in what was seen as a politically motivated coup. In 2020, he was appointed as the airline's independent director and rehabilitation planner after the airline filed for rehabilitation under Bankruptcy Act. He became Chairman of Rehabilitation Plan Administrator after court approval for rehabilitation on 15 June 2021. administrators.

== Education ==
Piyasvasti was born in 1953. He graduated from Brasenose College, Oxford in 1975 with BA (first class honours) in mathematics. He later obtained an MSc in econometrics and mathematical economics, and a PhD in economics from the London School of Economics.

== See also ==
- Energy Industry Liberalization and Privatization (Thailand)
