= Thailand at the 2018 Winter Olympics =

- Flag of Thailand
- IOC code: THA
- NOC: National Olympic Committee of Thailand
- Website: www.olympicthai.or.th (in Thai and English)

in Pyeongchang, South Korea 9–25 February 2018
- Competitors: 4 in 2 sports
- Flag bearer: Mark Chanloung (opening)
- Medals: Gold 0 Silver 0 Bronze 0 Total 0

Winter Olympics appearances (overview)
- 2002; 2006; 2010; 2014; 2018; 2022; 2026

Thailand competed at the 2018 Winter Olympics in Pyeongchang, South Korea, from 9 to 25 February 2018. The country's participation in Pyeongchang marked its fourth appearance in the Winter Olympics after its debut in the 2002 Winter Olympics.

Thailand was represented by four athletes who competed across two sports. Mark Chanloung served as the country's flag-bearer during the opening ceremony and a volunteer carried the flag during the closing ceremony. Thailand did not win any medals in the Games.

== Background ==
The National Olympic Committee of Thailand was formed in 1948 and recognized by the International Olympic Committee in 1950. The nation made its first Olympics appearance as an independent nation at the 1952 Summer Olympics. The current edition marked its fourth appearance at the Winter Olympic Games, after it made its debut at the 2002 Winter Olympics. It has appeared in every edition of the Winter Olympics since its debut, with the exception of the 2010 Winter Olympics in Vancouver.

The 2018 Winter Olympics were held in Pyeongchang, South Korea between 9 and 25 February 2018. Thailand was represented by four athletes, its largest ever delegation at the Winter Olympics. Mark Chanloung served as the country's flag-bearer during the opening ceremony, and a volunteer carried the flag during the closing ceremony. Thailand did not win a medal in the Games.

== Competitors ==
Sport	Men	Women	Total
Alpine skiing	1	1	2
Cross-country skiing	1	1	2
Total	2	2	4

== Alpine skiing ==
Thailand qualified one male and one female alpine skier. Alexia Arisarah Schenkel and Nicola Zanon both made their debut at the Winter Olympics.

The Alpine skiing events were held at the Jeongseon Alpine Centre in Bukpyeong. The course for the events was designed by former Olympic champion Bernhard Russi. The weather was cold and windy during the events, and it was the coldest since the 1994 Winter Olympics at Lillehammer. Zanon did not finish in the men's giant slalom event. He did not start the men's slalom event. Zanon did not finish both the women's slalom and women's giant slalom events.

Athlete	Event	Run 1		Run 2		Total	
Athlete	Event	Time	Rank	Time	Rank	Time	Rank
Nicola Zanon	Men's giant slalom	DNF					
Nicola Zanon	Men's slalom	DNS					
Alexia Arisarah Schenkel	Women's giant slalom	DNF					
Alexia Arisarah Schenkel	Women's slalom	DNF					

== Cross-country skiing ==
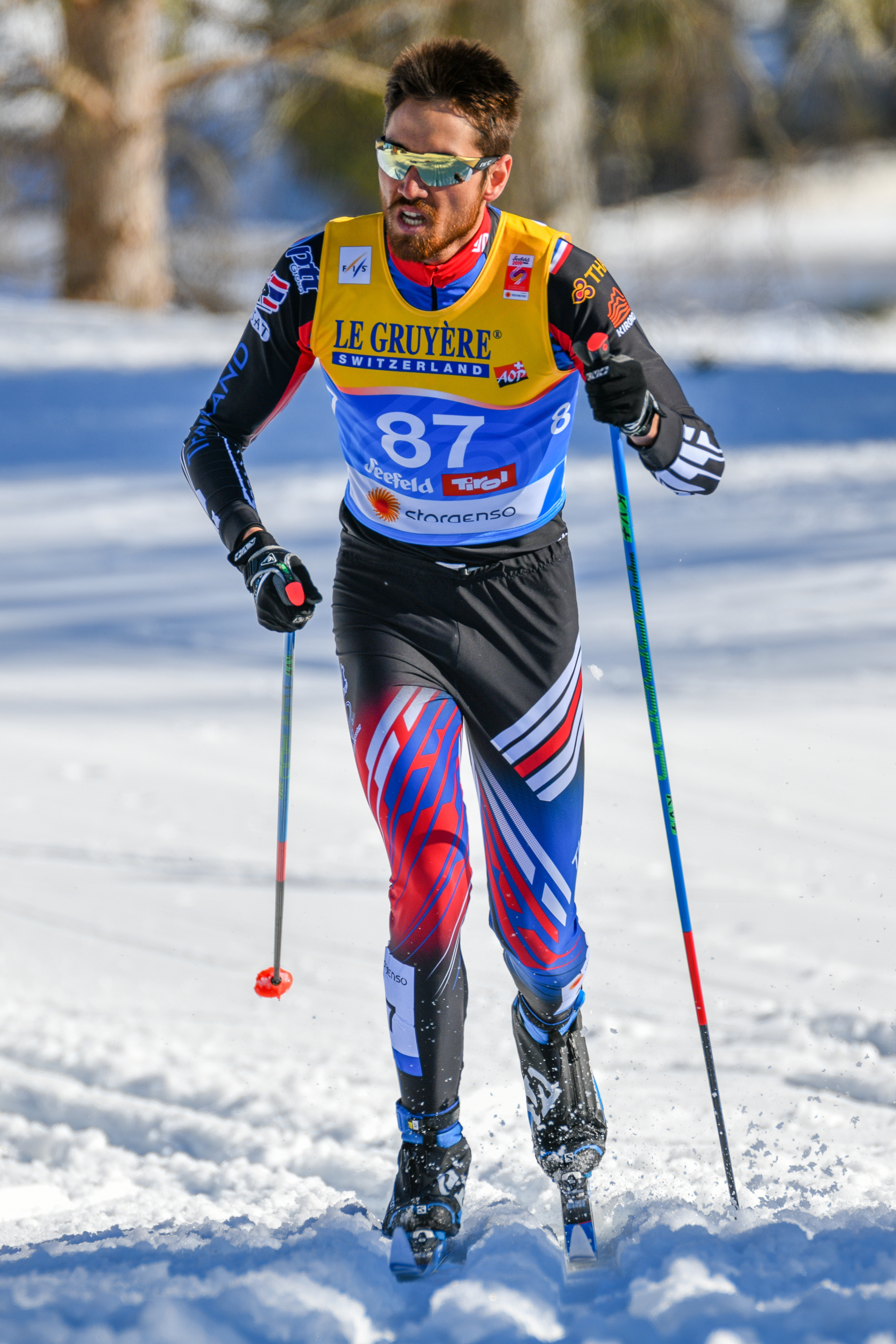
Mark Chanloung represented Thailand in cross-country skiing

As per the standards laid down by the International Ski Federation, athletes with a maximum of 300 points in the stipulated period were allowed to compete in the distance event. Thailand qualified two athletes, one male and one female. Thailand was represented by the siblings Mark and Karen Chanloung, who are of part Italian and part Thai ancestry and grew up in Gressoney-La-Trinité, Italy.

The main events were held at the Alpensia Cross-Country Skiing Centre. Flag-bearer Mark completed the 15 km (9.3 mi) course in 38:40.8. He finished the race in 79th position (out of 119 competitors), nearly five minutes behind the winner, Dario Cologna of Switzerland. In the men's sprint events, he clocked a time of over three minutes and 26 seconds, to finish 57th amongst the 80 participants in the qualifiers, and did not advance to the next round. In the women's 10 km freestyle, Karen finished 82nd amongst the 90 participants. She finished nearly seven and half minutes behind the winner Ragnhild Haga of Norway.

Distance

Athlete	Event	Final		
Athlete	Event	Time	Deficit	Rank
Mark Chanloung	Men's 15 km freestyle	38:40.8	+4:56.9	79
Mark Chanloung	Men's 50 km classical	LAP		
Karen Chanloung	Women's 10 km freestyle	32:30.2	+7:29.7	82

Sprint

Athlete	Event	Qualification		Quarterfinal		Semifinal		Final	
Athlete	Event	Time	Rank	Time	Rank	Time	Rank	Time	Rank
Mark Chanloung	Men's sprint	3:26.12	57	did not advance					

== See also ==
- Thailand at the 2017 Asian Winter Games
- Thailand at the 2018 Summer Youth Olympics
