= Alexia Arisarah Schenkel =

Swiss-Thai alpine skier (born 1996)

Alexia Schenkel
Personal information
- Full name: Alexia Arisarah Schenkel
- Born: 15 December 1996 (age 29) Zürich, Switzerland
- Height: 170 cm (5 ft 7 in)

Skiing career
- Sport: Alpine skiing
- Club: Zuerileu
- Disciplines: Slalom, giant slalom

Olympics
- Teams: 1 – (2018)
- Medals: 0
Medal record
Women's alpine skiing
Representing Thailand

Alexia Arisarah Schenkel (born 15 December 1996) is a Swiss-Thai alpine skier. She competed in slalom and giant slalom at the 2018 Winter Olympics.

== Alpine skiing results ==
All results are sourced from the International Ski Federation (FIS).

=== Olympic results ===
Year
Year	Age	Slalom	Giant; Slalom	Super-G	Downhill	Combined	Team Event
2018	21	DNF1	DNF1	—	—	—	—
