= Thailand at the 2002 Winter Olympics =

- IOC code: THA
- NOC: National Olympic Committee of Thailand

in Salt Lake City
- Competitors: 1 in 1 sport
- Flag bearer: Prawat Nagvajara
- Medals: Gold 0 Silver 0 Bronze 0 Total 0

Winter Olympics appearances (overview)
- 2002; 2006; 2010; 2014; 2018; 2022; 2026; 2030

Thailand sent a delegation to compete at the Winter Olympic Games for the first time at the 2002 Winter Olympics in Salt Lake City, United States from 8–24 February 2002. The delegation consisted of a single representative, cross-country skier Prawat Nagvajara. He failed to finish the 30 kilometre freestyle mass start and placed 67th in the sprint.

== Background ==
Thailand first joined Olympic competition at the 1952 Summer Olympics in Helsinki and, except for the boycotted 1980 Summer Olympics, has participated in every Summer Olympics since. Prawat Nagvajara qualified for the 2002 Winter Olympics, marking the first time Thailand had a participant in any Winter Olympic Games. As the only participant for Thailand, he was selected as the flag bearer for the opening ceremony.

== Cross-country skiing ==
Prawat Nagvajara was 43 years old at the time of the Salt Lake City Olympics, and was serving as an associate professor of computer and electrical engineering at Drexel University in the United States. After training on roller skis, he hired a coach, former Bulgarian bi-athlete Pepa Miloucheva, in the run-up to the Olympics. On 9 February, Nagvajara took part in the 30 kilometre freestyle mass start, where any competitor lapped by the leader was eliminated, and he failed to finish the race. On 19 February, Nagvajara was a competitor in the sprint and finished the qualification race in a time of 4 minutes and 14 seconds, which was good for 67th place. Only the top 16 from the qualifying round were allowed to proceed to the next stage, meaning he was eliminated. He would later go on to represent Thailand at the 2006 Winter Olympics in the 15 kilometres classical event.

Athlete	Event	Qualifying		Quarterfinal		Semifinal		Final	
Athlete	Event	Total	Rank	Total	Rank	Total	Rank	Total	Rank
Prawat Nagvajara	Sprint	4:14.55	67	Did not advance					67
Prawat Nagvajara	30 kilometre freestyle mass start	n/a						Did not finish	

== See also ==
- Thailand at the 2002 Asian Games
