= Rangsit Yanothai =

Thai sports shooter (born 1936)

Personal information
- Born: 27 October 1936 (age 89)

Sport
- Sport: Sports shooting

Rangsit Yanothai (born 27 October 1936) is a Thai former sports shooter. He competed at the 1968, 1972 and 1984 Summer Olympics. He also won several medals at the Asian Games.
