= Nicola Zanon =

Italian-Thai alpine skier (born 1996)

Personal information
- Born: 14 December 1996 (age 29) Cles, Italy
- Height: 170 cm (5 ft 7 in) (2018)

Skiing career
- Sport: Alpine skiing ♂
- Disciplines: Giant slalom, slalom

Olympics
- Teams: 2 – (2018, 2022)

Nicola Zanon (born 14 December 1996) is an Italian-Thai alpine skier who competed for Thailand at the 2018 Winter Olympics and 2022 Winter Olympics.

== Career ==
Zanon was born to an Italian father and a Thai mother and grew up in Val di Rabbi in Trentino. He started skiing at age eight at the Madonna di Campiglio.

He previously attempted to qualify for the 2014 Winter Olympics in Sochi, Russia but failed, leading to his retirement and to work as a woodworker with his father. However, he came out of retirement when the Ski and Snowboard Association of Thailand in February 2017 offered him a chance to compete at the 2018 Winter Olympics for the Southeast Asian nation. He participated in races in Argentina, Chile, and Italy to qualify for the Olympics.

Before he participated in the 2018 Winter Olympics in Pyeongchang, South Korea, he trained at the Piste Azzurre in Val di Fassa under coach Stefano Vampa. In the men's giant slalom event held on 18 February he did not finish in the first run.
