= Kanes Sucharitakul =

Thai alpine skier (born 1992)

Personal information
- Born: February 13, 1992 (age 34) Bangkok, Thailand

Sport
- Country: Thailand
- Sport: Alpine skiing

Kanes Sucharitakul (Thai: คเณศ สุจริตกุล; RTGS: Khanet Sucharitakun; born February 13, 1992, in Bangkok) is an alpine skier from Thailand. He competed for Thailand at the 2014 Winter Olympics in the slalom and giant slalom. He was Thailand's flag bearer at the opening ceremony of the 2014 Olympic Winter Games in Sochi.

== See also ==
- Thailand at the 2014 Winter Olympics
- Prawat Nagvajara, first Thai Winter Olympian, Thai cross-country skier
