= Somchai Chanthavanij =

Thai sports shooter (born 1947)

Personal information
- Nationality: Thai
- Born: 10 May 1947 (age 78)

Sport
- Sport: Sports shooting

Somchai Chanthavanij (born 10 May 1947) is a Thai sports shooter. He competed at the 1976 Summer Olympics, the 1984 Summer Olympics and the 1988 Summer Olympics.
