= Prawat Nagvajara =

Thai cross country skier (born 1958)

Prawat Nagvajara (Thai: ประวัติ นาควัชระ; RTGS: Prawat Nakwatchara), born December 1, 1958, is a Thai academic and cross-country skier. He is the first person to have represented Thailand at the Winter Olympic Games, having taken part in the 2002 and 2006 Winter Olympics. Unsurprisingly, he was therefore his country's flagbearer at the Games' Opening Ceremonies on both occasions.

Nagvajara was born and grew up in Bangkok, Thailand, and was a member of a teenage rock band. He is currently a professor of electrical engineering at Drexel University in Pennsylvania, United States. Nagvajara has stated that Philip Boit was his inspiration to participate in the Olympics.

At the 2002 Games, Nagvajara took part in the 30 km race, but was eliminated after being lapped. He then competed in the 1.5 km sprint, and finished 68th out of 71 with a time of 4:14.55 - behind Cameroon's Isaac Menyoli and ahead of Costa Rica's Arturo Kinch.

At the 2006 Games, he competed in the 15 km classical race. He finished 97th with a time of 1:07:15.9.

== See also ==
- Vanessa Vanakorn, the second ever Thai Winter Olympian, first woman, second skier, first female alpine skier
- Kanes Sucharitakul, third ever Thai Winter Olympian, second man, third skier, first male alpine skier
- Thailand at the 2002 Winter Olympics
- Thailand at the 2006 Winter Olympics
