= Karen Chanloung =

Italian-Thai cross-country skier

Personal information
- Born: 1 July 1996 (age 29) Aosta, Italy

Karen Chanloung (Thai: คาเรน จันเหลือง; RTGS: Kharen Chanlueang; born 1 July 1996) is an Italian-Thai cross-country skier.

== Career ==
Chanloung originally competed for Italy and, in 2016 switched to competing for Thailand, as she holds dual citizenship.

=== 2017 Asian Winter Games ===
Chanloung competed for Thailand at the 2017 Asian Winter Games in Sapporo, Japan. However, her results did not count towards the official results as she had not met the requirements to compete for the team (the minimum amount of time had not been met in waiting to switch to competing for another country).

=== 2018 and 2022 Winter Olympics ===
Chanloung competed for Thailand at the 2018 Winter Olympics and also participated for Thailand at the 2022 Winter Olympics, where she was one of two flagbearers in the opening ceremony. In both Olympics, Karen and her brother Mark Chanloung were the only cross-country skiers on the team.
