= Mark Chanloung =

Italian-Thai cross country skier

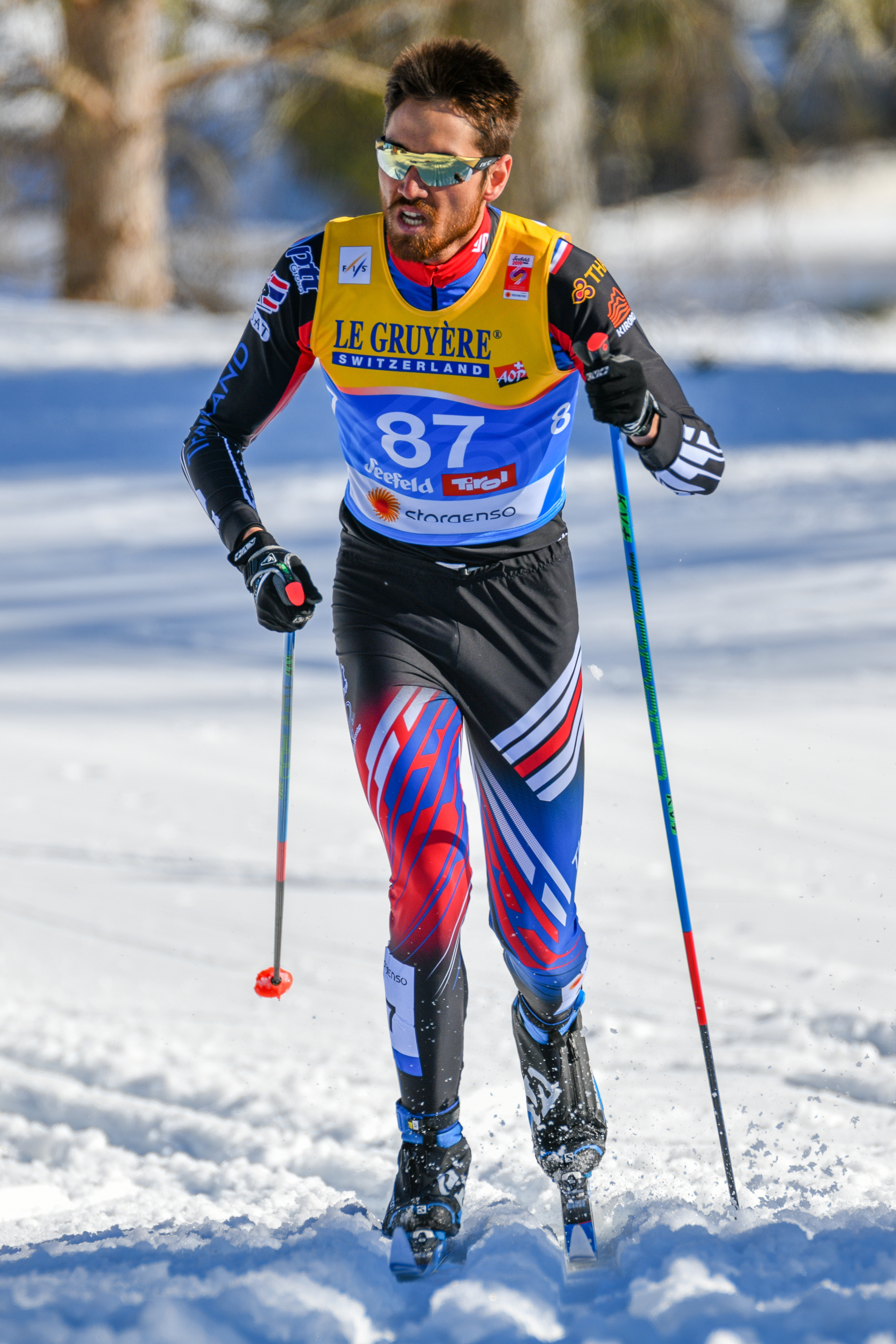
- FIS Nordic World Ski Championships Seefeld 2019 - Men 15km Interval Start Classic. The picture shows Mark Chanloung (THA).

Personal information
- Born: 9 February 1995 (age 31) Gressoney-La-Trinité, Italy

Mark Chanloung (Thai: มรรค จันเหลือง; RTGS: Mak Chanlueang; born 9 February 1995) is an Italian-born cross-country skier competing for Thailand.

== Career ==
Chanloung originally competed for Italy and switched to competing for Thailand, as he holds dual citizenship.

=== 2017 Asian Winter Games ===
Chanloung competed for Thailand at the 2017 Asian Winter Games in Sapporo, Japan. However, his results did not count towards the official results as he had not met the requirements to compete for the team (the minimum amount of time had not been met in waiting to switch to competing for another country).

=== 2018 Winter Olympics ===
Chanloung competed for Thailand at the 2018 Winter Olympics. Mark and his sister Karen Chanloung are scheduled to be the only cross-country skiers on the team.

He again participated in the 2026 Winter Olympics.
