= National Olympic Committee of Thailand =

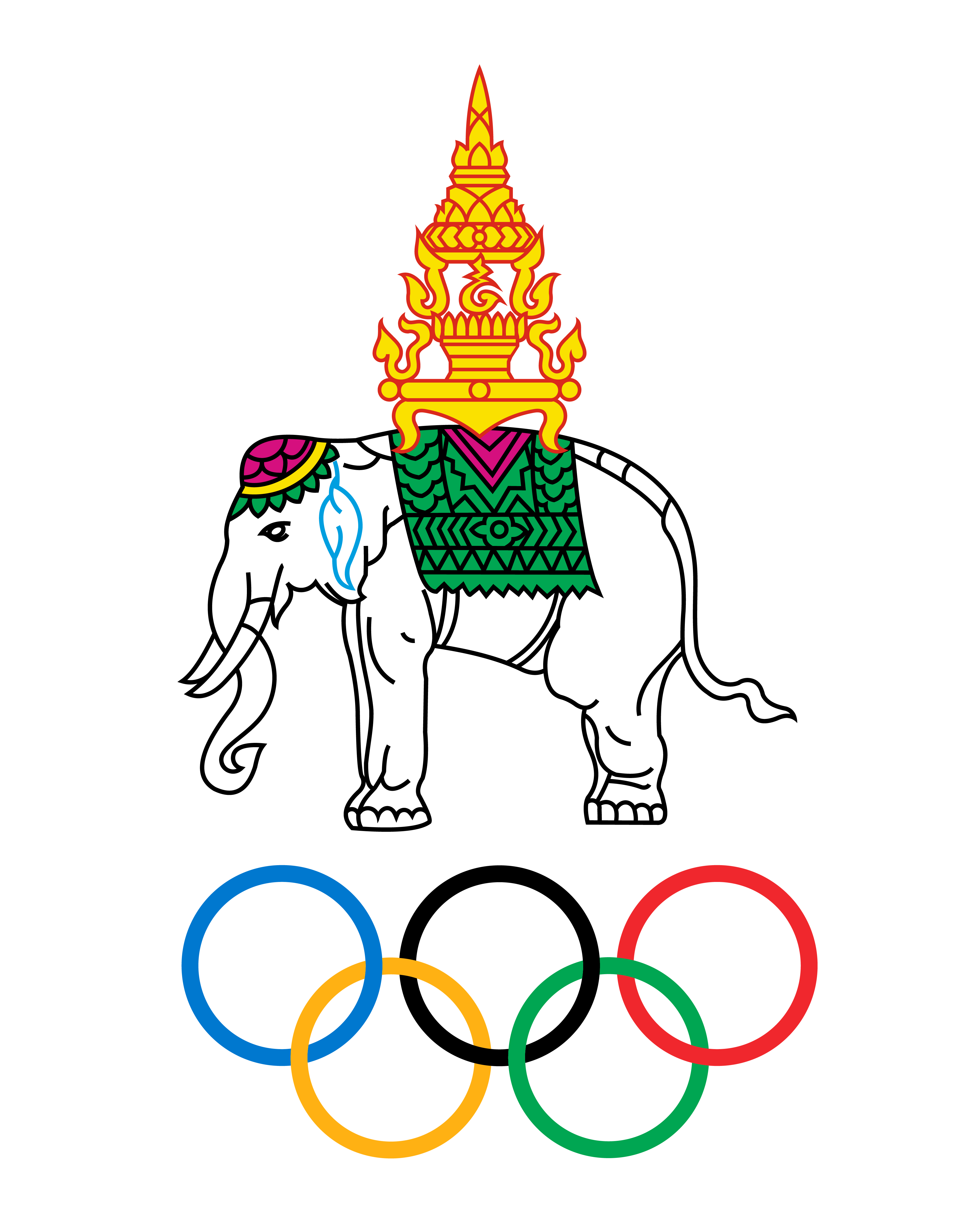
- Country: Thailand
- Code: THA
- Created: 1948
- Recognized: 1950
- Continental Association: OCA
- Headquarters: Ampawan House; Bangkok
- President: Assistant Professor Pimol Srivikorn
- Secretary General: Mr. Thana Chaiprasit
- Website: olympicthai.org

The National Olympic Committee of Thailand under the Royal Patronage of His Majesty the King (Thai: คณะกรรมการโอลิมปิคแห่งประเทศไทย ในพระบรมราชูปถัมภ์) is the national Olympic committee in Thailand for the Olympic Games movement, based in Ampawan House, Bangkok, Thailand. It is a nonprofit organisation that selects teams and raises funds to send Thailand competitors to Olympic events organised by the International Olympic Committee (IOC), Asian Games events organised by the Olympic Council of Asia (OCA) and Southeast Asian Games events organised by the Southeast Asian Games Federation (SEAGF).

== History ==
The forerunner of the NOCT was the "International Relations Committee for Sports" which was set up in 1946, originally a society for expatriates living in Thailand to participate in sports, and raise money through ticket sales for public sports participation and the Thai Red Cross Society.

The committee decided to create an official Olympic organization to help develop good relations with other nations via sport, and the NOCT was officially formed on 20 June 1948, and subsequently recognized by the International Olympic Committee at the IOC meeting in Copenhagen on 15 May 1950. His Majesty King Bhumibol Adulyadej (Rama IX) granted a Royal Patronage to the NOCT on 26 December 1949, as well as the official Symbol of the Olympic Committee of Thailand on 8 January 1951.

== Governance ==
=== Executive board ===
Designation	Name	Sport
President	Assistant Professor Pimol Srivikorn	taekwondo
Vice presidents	Chaipak Siriwat	Field hockey
Vice presidents	Charoen Wattanasin	
Vice presidents	Supitr Samahito	
Vice presidents	Thana Chaiprasit	Sepak takraw
Vice presidents	Decha Hemkasri	Cycling
Vice presidents	Chainarong Charoenruk	Rowing
Vice presidents	Suwanna Silpa-Archa	Ice Skating
Vice presidents	Nualphan Lamsam	Football
Secretary general	Thana Chaiprasit	Sepak Takraw
Treasurer	Apiwat Sriwattana	Modern pentathlon

=== President ===
List of presidents
No.	President (Birth–Death)	Term of office	
No.	President (Birth–Death)	From	To
1	Phraya Jindarak (1891–1966)	1948	1965
2	Praphas Charusathien (1912–1997)	1965	1973
3	Dawee Chullasapya (1914–1996)	1974	1996
4	Suraphon Bunkichsophon; Acting president	1996	1997
5	Chetta Thanajaro (1938–)	1997	2001
6	Yuthasak Sasiprapha (1937–)	2001	2017
7	Prawit Wongsuwan (1945–)	2017	2024
8	Assistant Professor Pimol Srivikorn	2025	present

== National governing body members ==
=== Supervised members ===
Sport	National governing body	Acronym	President	Headquarters
Aquatics	Thailand Swimming Association	TSA	Prawit Wongsuwan	Bang Kapi, Bangkok
Archery	National Archery Association of Thailand	NAAT	Sanguan Kosavinta	Bang Kapi, Bangkok
Athletics	Athletics Association of Thailand	AAT	Sant Sarutanond	Khlong Luang, Pathum Thani
Badminton	Badminton Association of Thailand	BAT	Patama Leeswadtrakul	Pathum Wan, Bangkok
Baseball	Amateur Baseball Association of Thailand	ABAT	Somsak Pornpudpong	Bang Kapi, Bangkok
Basketball	Basketball Sport Association of Thailand	BSAT	Chalermkiat Potongnak	Bang Kapi, Bangkok
Bowling	Thai Tenpin Bowling Association	TTBA	Sompan Charumilinda	Prawet, Bangkok
Amateur boxing	Amateur Boxing Association of Thailand	ABAT	Pichai Chunhawachira	Bang Kapi, Bangkok
Contract bridge	Contract Bridge League of Thailand	CBLT	Chayawat Pisessit	Bang Kapi, Bangkok
Cycling	Thai Cycling Association	TCA	Decha Hemkasri	Bang Kapi, Bangkok
Equestrian	Thailand Equestrian Federation	TEF	Harald Link	Phaya Thai, Bangkok
Fencing	Thailand Fencing Federation	TFA	Somded Tongpiam	Bang Kapi, Bangkok
Association football	Football Association of Thailand	FAT	Somyot Poompanmoung	Bang Kapi, Bangkok
Gymnastics	Gymnastics Association of Thailand	GAT	Jiradech Worapeankul	Bang Kapi, Bangkok
Handball	Handball Association of Thailand	HAT	Sombat Kuruphan	Pathum Wan, Bangkok
Field hockey	Thailand Hockey Association	THA	Chaiyapak Siriwat	Bang Kapi, Bangkok
Ice hockey	Ice Hockey Association of Thailand	IHAT	Krisada Kasemsunt	Bang Kapi, Bangkok
Ice skating	Figure and Speed skating Association of Thailand	FSAT	Suwanna Silpa-archa	Bang Kapi, Bangkok
Judo	Judo Association of Thailand	JAT	Hassabodin Rojanachiva	Bang Kapi, Bangkok
Modern pentathlon	Modern Pentathlon Association of Thailand	MPAT	Apiwat Sriwattana	Bangkok Noi, Bangkok
Pétanque	Petanque Federation of Thailand	PFT	Kamthon Sindhvananda	Bang Kapi, Bangkok
Rowing	Rowing and Canoeing Association of Thailand	RCAT	Chainarong Chareonrak	Bang Kapi, Bangkok
Rugby union	Thai Rugby Union	TRU	Attapoj Klongtruadroke	Pathum Wan, Bangkok
Sailing	Yacht Racing Association of Thailand	YRAT	Kraisorn Chansuvanich	Bangkok Yai, Bangkok
Sepak takraw	Takraw Association of Thailand	TAT	Charouck Arirachakaran	Dusit, Bangkok
Shooting	National Shooting Sport Association of Thailand	NSSAT	Tawid Chinbunchorn	Bang Kapi, Bangkok
Skeet shooting	Skeet and Trap Association of Thailand	STAT	Vudha Bhirombhakdi	Bang Kapi, Bangkok
Skiing	Ski and Snowboard Association of Thailand	SSAT	Piyasvasti Amranand	Bang Kapi, Bangkok
Softball	Amateur Softball Association of Thailand	ASAT	Banyong Kiartkongchuchai	Bang Kapi, Bangkok
Table tennis	Table Tennis Association of Thailand	TTAT	Piradej Pruttipruk	Bang Kapi, Bangkok
Taekwondo	Taekwondo Association of Thailand	TAT	Pimol Srivikorn	Bang Kapi, Bangkok
Tennis	Lawn Tennis Association of Thailand	LTAT	Kitsombat Uamongkol	Pak Kret, Nonthaburi
Triathlon	Triathlon Association of Thailand	TAT	Vijit Sithinavin	Lat Phrao, Bangkok
Volleyball	Thailand Volleyball Association	TVA	Somporn Chaibangyang	Bang Kapi, Bangkok
Weightlifting	Thai Amateur Weightlifting Association	TAWA	Intarat Yodbangtoey	Bang Kapi, Bangkok
Wrestling	Thailand Amateur Wrestling Association	TAWA	Kittiposh Suchantabutr	Bang Kapi, Bangkok

=== Recognized members ===
Sport	National governing body	Acronym	President	Headquarters
Air sports	Royal Aeronautic Sports Association of Thailand	RASAT	Thongchai Wongsawan	Bang Sue, Bangkok
Automobile	Royal Automobile Association of Thailand	RAAT	Somporn Suebtawilkul	Chatuchak, Bangkok
Bodybuilding	Thailand Bodybuilding & Physique Sport Association	TBPA	Sukree Suphawareekul	Bang Kapi, Bangkok
Professional boxing	Professional Boxing Association of Thailand	PBAT	Somchart Charoenwacharawit	Bang Kapi, Bangkok
Chess	Thailand Chess Association	TCA	Kittiratt Na-Ranong	Bang Kapi, Bangkok
Cricket	Cricket Association of Thailand	CAT	Ravi Sehgal	Bang Kapi, Bangkok
Cue sports	Billiard Sports Association of Thailand	BSAT	Sindhu Poonsiriwong	Khlong Toei, Bangkok
Dancesport	Thailand Dancesports Association	TDSA	Charan Chearavanont	Sathon, Bangkok
Disabled sports	Sports Association for the Disabled of Thailand	SADT	Osot Pawilai	Pathum Wan, Bangkok
eSports	Thailand E-Sports Federation	TESF	Santi Lothong	Bang Kapi, Bangkok
Extreme sport	Thailand Extreme Sports Association	TESA	Piti Bhirombhakdi	Pathum Wan, Bangkok
Footvolley	Footvolley Association of Thailand	FVAT	Phornsan Kamlang-ek	Ratchathewi, Bangkok
Go	Go Association of Thailand	GAT	Korsak Chairasmisak	Sathon, Bangkok
Golf	Thailand Golf Association	TGA	Rungsrid Luxsitanonda	Bang Kapi, Bangkok
Professional golf	Thailand Professional Golf Association	Thai PGA	Methee Sudasna Na Ayudhya	Bang Kapi, Bangkok
Jet ski	Thai Jet Sports Boating Association	TJSBA	Sanit Worapanya	Bang Kapi, Bangkok
Jujutsu	Ju-jitsu Association of Thailand	JAT	Choochart Boonchai	Bang Kapi, Bangkok
Kabaddi	Kabaddi Association of Thailand	KAT	Jirapan Kasemsansuk	Bang Kapi, Bangkok
Karate	Thailand Karate Federation	TKF	Aniwat Siridejvaravong	Bang Kapi, Bangkok
Kurash	Thailand Kurash Association	TKA	Wisit Piyamada	Thanyaburi, Pathum Thani
Lawn bowls	Lawn Bowls Association of Thailand	LBAT	Thaemsin Ratanaphan	Bang Kapi, Bangkok
Motorcycle sport	Motorcycle Sports Association of Thailand	MSAT	Weerayuth Dissayasrin	Don Mueang, Bangkok
Muaythai	Amateur Muaythai Association of Thailand	AMAT	Sakchye Tapsuwan	Bang Kapi, Bangkok
Netball	Netball Association of Thailand	NAT	Sompong Chatawiti	Bang Kapi, Bangkok
Pencak silat	Pencak Silat Association of Thailand	PSAT	Panu Uthairat	Bang Kapi, Bangkok
Polo	Thailand Polo Association	TPA	Kanoksakdi Bhinsaeng	Ratchathewi, Bangkok
Practical shooting	Thai Practical Shooting Association	THPSA	Winai Pattiyakul	Bang Kapi, Bangkok
Sport climbing	Sports Climbing Association of Thailand	SCAT	Somboon Uthaiwienkul	Bang Kapi, Bangkok
Squash	Thailand Squash Rackets Association	TSRA	Patee Sarasin	Bang Kapi, Bangkok
Thai sports	Thai Sports Association of Thailand	TSAT	Pariyakorn Ratanasuba	Bang Kapi, Bangkok
Transplant sports	Transplant Sport Association of Thailand	TSAT	Phaibul Jitprapai	Bang Kapi, Bangkok
Tug of war	Tug of War Thailand Association	TWTA	Naris Singhawangsha	Bueng Kum, Bangkok
Windsurfing	Windsurfing Association of Thailand	WATH	Ittipol Khunplome	Bang Kapi, Bangkok
Woodball	Woodball Association of Thailand	WAT	Pattanachart Kittibovorn	Pathum Wan, Bangkok
Wushu	Wushu Federation of Thailand	WFT	Jinda Nangseu	Taling Chan, Bangkok
Xiangqi	Xiangqi Association of Thailand	XAT	Prasit Pinijsoponphan	Bang Kapi, Bangkok

== See also ==
- Thailand at the Olympics
- Thailand at the Paralympics
- Thailand at the Asian Games
