= Tropical nations at the Winter Olympics =

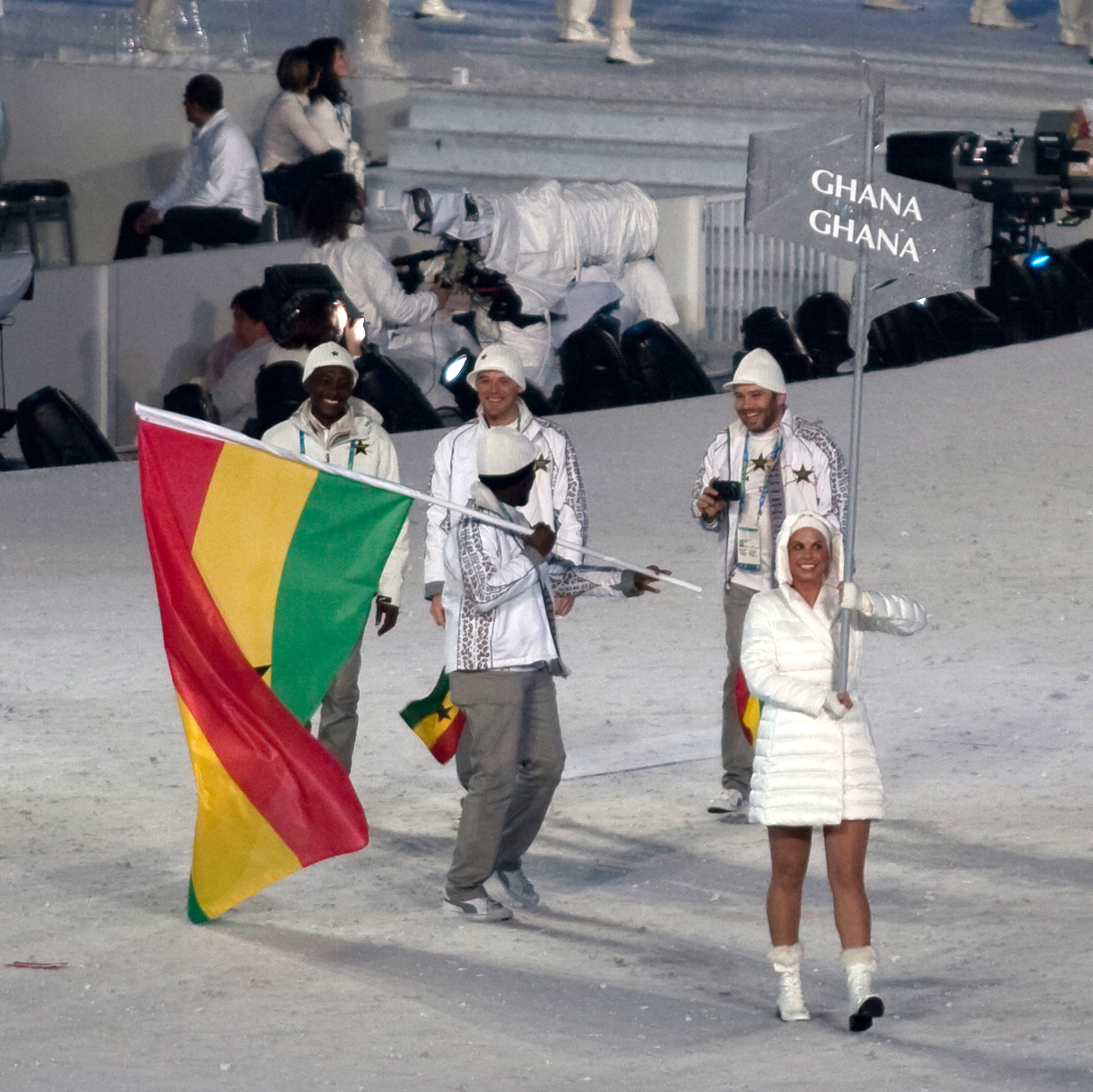
The team from Ghana during the opening ceremony of the 2010 Winter Olympics.

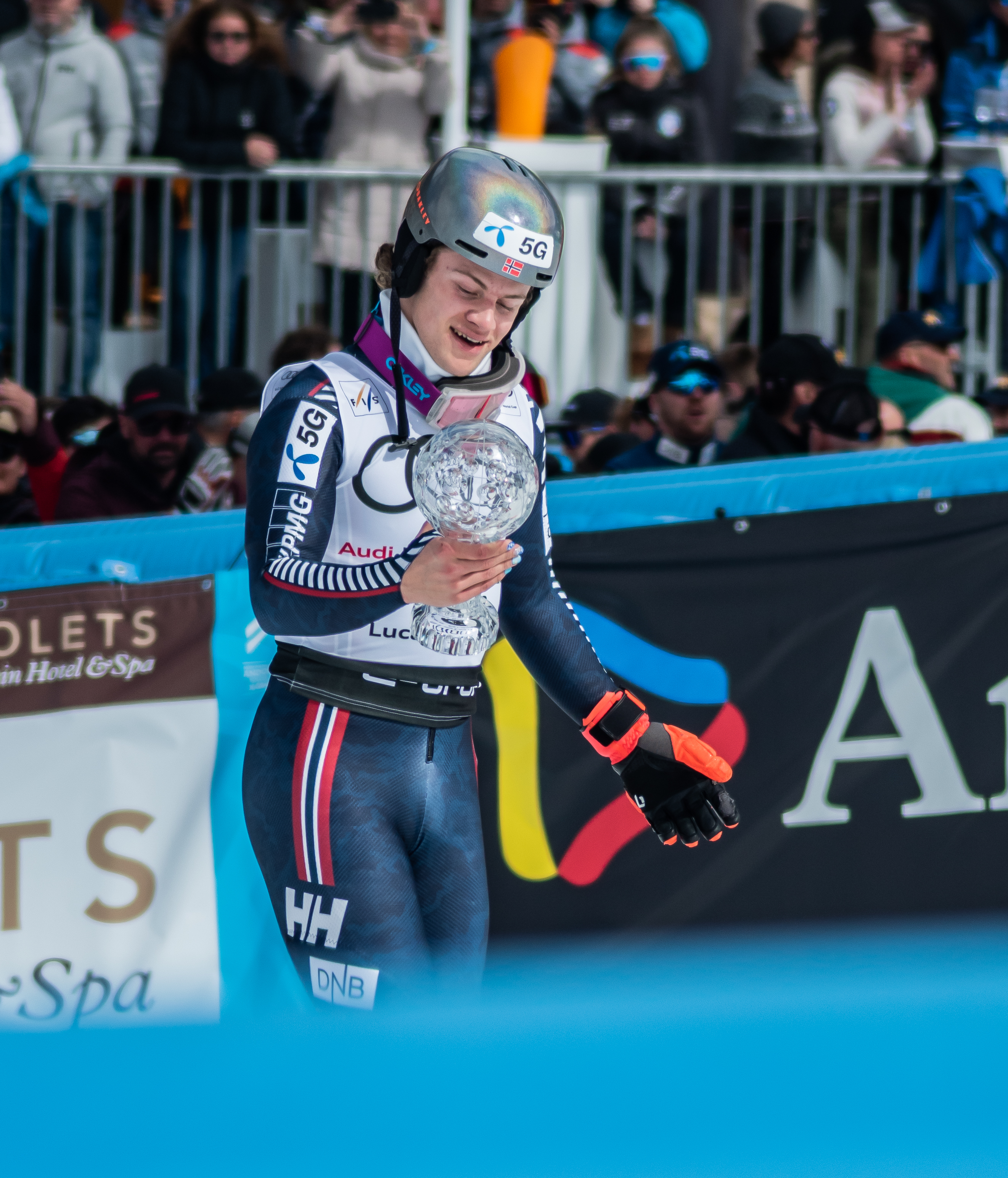
In 2026, Lucas Pinheiro Braathen of Brazil became the first winter athlete representing a tropical country to win an Olympic medal.

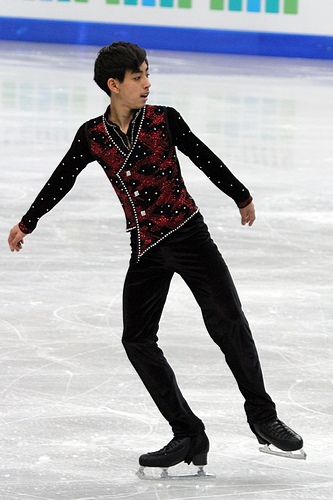
In 2014, Michael Christian Martinez became the first Filipino, the first Southeast Asian, and the first male figure skater from a tropical country in the Winter Olympics, as well as the first Philippine Winter Olympian in 22 years.

Several tropical nations have participated in the Winter Olympics despite not having the climate for winter sports. Partly because of that, their entries are a subject of human interest stories during the Games.

The first warm-weather, but not fully tropical, nation participating in the Winter Olympics was Mexico. Much of Mexico is at a latitude north of the Tropic of Cancer, and most of the country has a subtropical highland or semi-arid climate, so it is not exclusively a tropical nation. Nonetheless, Mexico made its Winter Olympic debut at the 1928 Winter Olympics with a five-man bobsleigh team that finished eleventh of twenty-three entrants. Mexico did not return again to the Winter Games until the 1984 Winter Olympics.

The first truly tropical nation to compete in the Winter Olympic Games was the Philippines, who sent two alpine skiers to the 1972 Winter Olympics in Sapporo, Japan. Ben Nanasca placed 42nd in giant slalom skiing (out of 73 entrants), and Juan Cipriano did not finish. In slalom skiing, neither skier was able to finish. Costa Rica became the second tropical nation to participate at the Winter Games, in the 1980 Winter Olympics at Lake Placid, New York, where Arturo Kinch also competed in alpine skiing events. Kinch would continue to compete for Costa Rica at three more Winter Games, including the 2006 Winter Olympics at age 49. There he finished 96th in the 15 km cross-country skiing event, ahead of only Prawat Nagvajara of Thailand, another tropical nation.

The 1988 Winter Olympics in Calgary, Alberta, Canada attracted many tropical nations, including Costa Rica, Fiji, Guam, Guatemala, Jamaica, Netherlands Antilles, the Philippines, Puerto Rico, and the United States Virgin Islands. The Jamaica bobsleigh team became a fan favorite at these Games and were later the inspiration of the 1993 motion picture Cool Runnings. In the 1994 Winter Olympics six years later, the Jamaican four-man sled placed a creditable fourteenth, ahead of the United States and Russia, while Jamaican-born bobsledder Lascelles Brown won silver for Canada in 2006.

The 2006 Winter Olympics in Turin, Italy marked the Winter Games debut of Ethiopia and Madagascar. The 2010 Winter Olympics in Vancouver, British Columbia, Canada saw the debut of the Cayman Islands, Colombia, Peru, and Ghana. The 2014 Winter Olympics saw the debut of Dominica, Paraguay, Timor-Leste, Togo, Tonga, and Zimbabwe. The 2018 Winter Olympics saw the debut of Ecuador, Eritrea, Malaysia, Nigeria, and Singapore. The 2022 Winter Olympics saw the debut of Haiti. The 2026 Winter Olympics saw the debut of Benin and Guinea-Bissau.

On 14 February 2026, alpine skier Lucas Pinheiro Braathen, born in Norway to a Brazilian mother and Norwegian father, became the first Latin American, South American and Brazilian as well as the first athlete representing any tropical nation to win a medal in the Winter Olympics with a gold in the men's giant slalom. Pinheiro Braathen is a citizen of Brazil and Norway and previously competed for Norway, but then switched to Brazil.

== List of participating tropical nations ==
World map with tropical latitudes highlighted in red

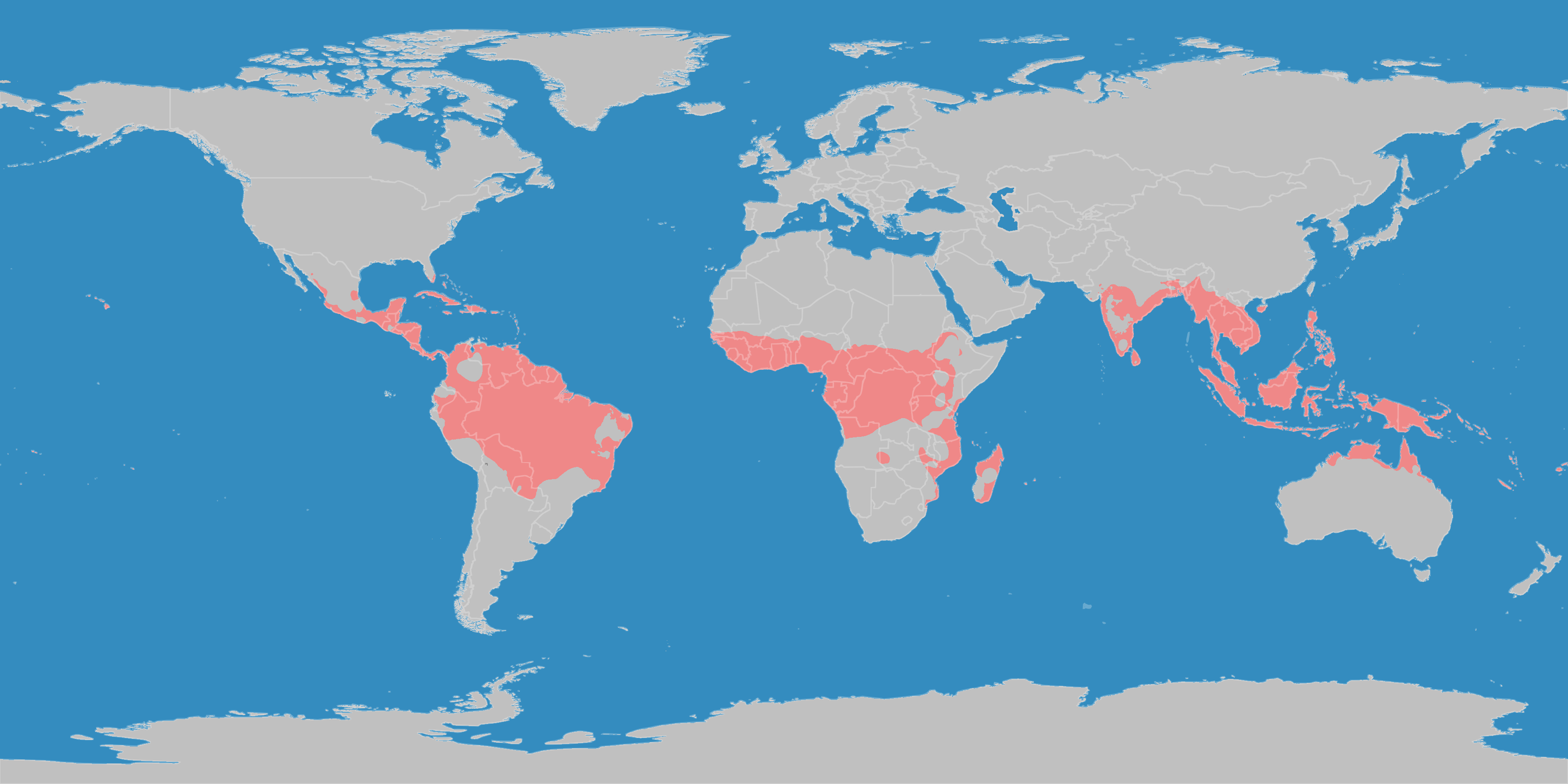
World map with tropical climates highlighted in red

This list of nations includes those that lie entirely or predominantly within the tropical latitudes and also have a mostly tropical climate according to the Köppen climate classification system. Years of Winter Olympic Games participation are shown.

Africa
Benin	2026
Cameroon	2002
Eritrea	2018–2026
Ethiopia	2006–2010
Ghana	2010, 2018–2022
Guinea-Bissau	2026
Kenya	1998–2006, 2018, 2026
Madagascar	2006, 2018–2026
Nigeria	2018–2026
Senegal	1984, 1992–1994, 2006–2010
Togo	2014–2018
Zimbabwe	2014
Americas
Bolivia	1956, 1980–1992, 2018–2026
British Virgin Islands	1984, 2014
Brazil	1992–2026
Cayman Islands	2010–2014
Colombia	2010, 2018–2026
Costa Rica	1980–1992, 2006
Dominica	2014
Ecuador	2018–2026
Guatemala	1988
Haiti	2022–2026
Honduras	1992
Jamaica	1988–2002, 2010–2026
Netherlands Antilles	1988–1992
Paraguay	2014
Peru	2010–2014, 2022
Puerto Rico	1984–2002, 2018–2026
Trinidad and Tobago	1994–2002, 2022–2026
Venezuela	1998–2006, 2014, 2026
Virgin Islands	1988–2006, 2014, 2022
Asia-Pacific
American Samoa	1994, 2022
Fiji	1988, 1994, 2002
Guam	1988
Hong Kong	2002–2026
Malaysia	2018–2026
Philippines	1972, 1988–1992, 2014–2026
Singapore	2018, 2026
Thailand	2002–2006, 2014–2026
Timor-Leste	2014–2022
Tonga	2014–2018

Other warm-weather nations (located in the subtropics, for example) that have competed in the Winter Games include Australia (which has a tropical far north, and became the first Southern Hemisphere nation to win a gold medal at the Winter Olympics in 2002), Bermuda, Chinese Taipei, Eswatini, Hong Kong, India, Mexico, South Africa, Uruguay and several North African nations including Algeria, Egypt and Morocco.

Tonga sought to make its Winter Olympic debut at the 2010 Winter Olympics by entering a single competitor in luge, attracting some media attention, but he crashed in the final round of qualifying. Two years later, he attracted media attention again when it was discovered he had altered his name to that of one of his sponsors, a lingerie firm, as a marketing stunt. He was, at that time, in training to attempt to qualify for the 2014 Winter Olympics.

== Medalist from tropical nations ==
Medal	Nation	Name	Olympics	Sport	Event
Gold	Brazil	Lucas Pinheiro Braathen	(Italy) 2026 Milano-Cortina	Alpine skiing	Men's giant slalom

== Notable winter Olympians from tropical nations ==
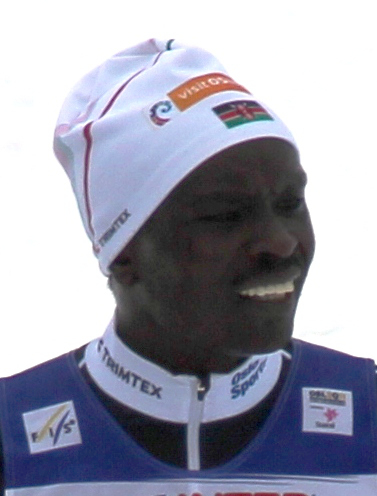
Philip Boit was the first Kenyan to participate in the Winter Olympics.

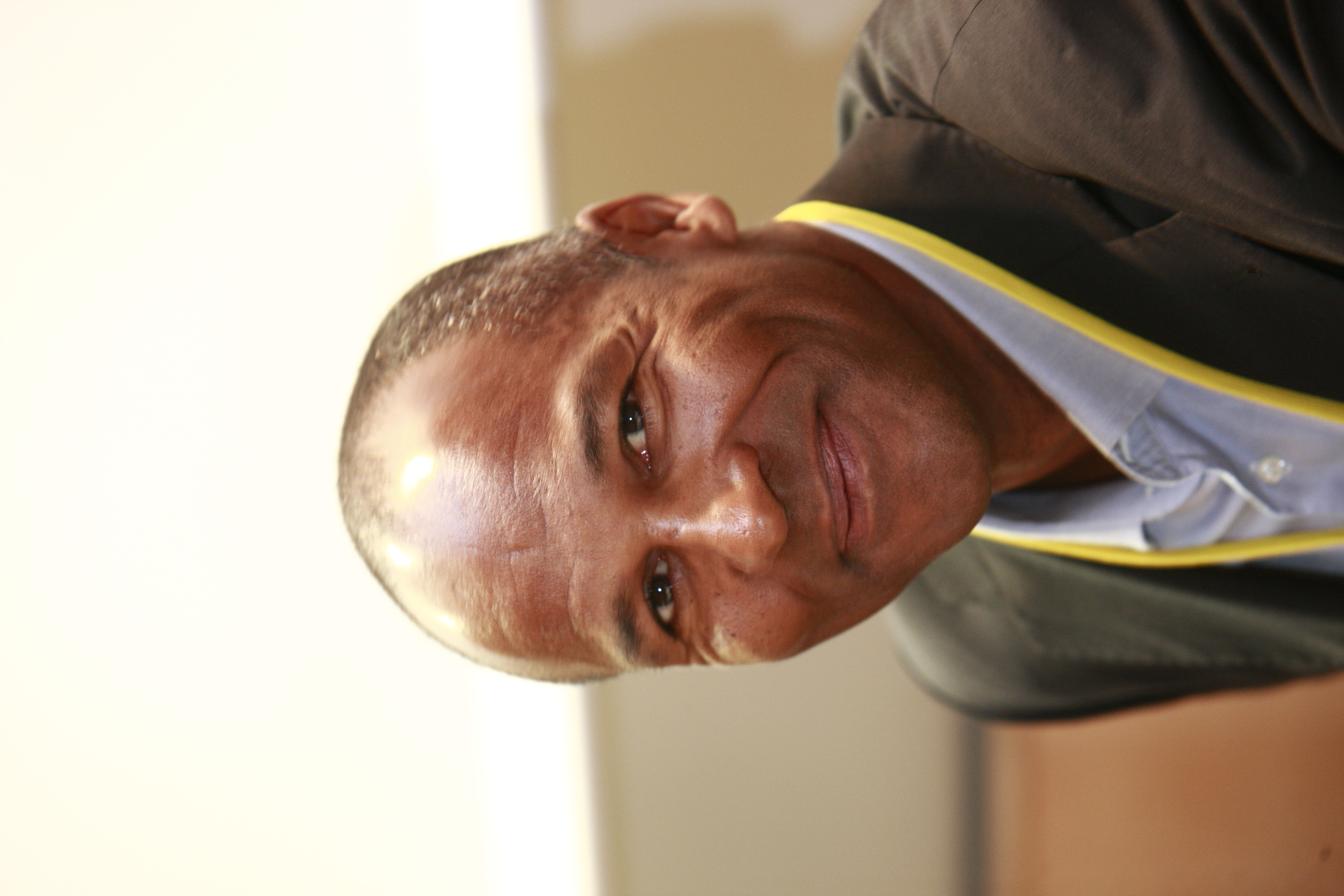
Lamine Guèye, the first Black African skier to take part in a Winter Olympics.

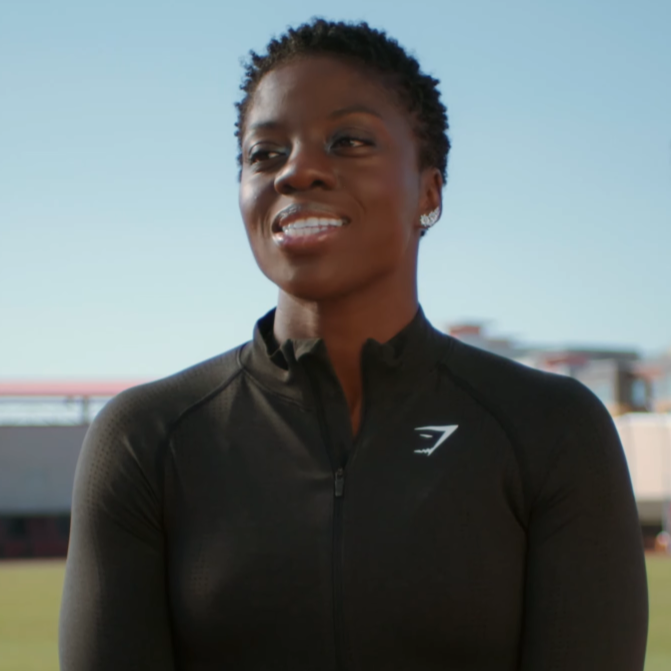
Seun Adigun, founder of the Nigeria bobsled team and the first African to participate in both the Summer and Winter Olympics.

Name	Nation	Sport
Shannon-Ogbnai Abeda	Eritrea	alpine skiing
Anne Abernathy	Virgin Islands	luge
Simidele Adeagbo	Nigeria	skeleton
Seun Adigun	Nigeria	bobsleigh
Bruno Banani	Tonga	luge
Judd Bankert	Guam	biathlon
Iginia Boccalandro	Venezuela	luge
Philip Boit	Kenya	cross-country skiing
Lucas Pinheiro Braathen	Brazil (Note: Braathen competed for Norway in the 2022 Games, but switched his sporting nationality to Brazil in 2024.)	alpine skiing
Lascelles Brown	Jamaica (Note: Brown competed for Jamaica in the 2002 Games, but has competed for Canada since 2006.)	bobsleigh
Edson Bindilatti	Brazil	bobsleigh
Roberto Carcelen	Peru	cross-country skiing
Pedro Causil	Colombia	speed skating
Karen Chanloung	Thailand	cross-country skiing
Mark Chanloung	Thailand	cross-country skiing
Isabel Clark Ribeiro	Brazil	snowboarding
Mialitiana Clerc	Madagascar	alpine skiing
Cynthia Denzler	Colombia	alpine skiing
Alessia Dipol	Togo	alpine skiing
Erroll Fraser	British Virgin Islands	speed skating
Akwasi Frimpong	Ghana	skeleton
Yohan Goutt Gonçalves	Timor-Leste	alpine skiing
Alphonse Gomis	Senegal	alpine skiing
Lamine Guèye	Senegal	alpine skiing
Werner Hoeger	Venezuela	luge
Errol Kerr	Jamaica	freestyle skiing
Arturo Kinch	Costa Rica	alpine skiing and cross-country skiing
Eric Maleson	Brazil	bobsleigh
Michael Christian Martinez	Philippines	figure skating
Andrew McNeilly	Trinidad and Tobago	bobsleigh
Isaac Menyoli	Cameroon	cross-country skiing
Renato Mizoguchi	Brazil	luge
Jaqueline Mourão	Brazil	biathlon and cross-country skiing
Prawat Nagvajara	Thailand	cross-country skiing
Kwame Nkrumah-Acheampong	Ghana	alpine skiing
Raymond Ocampo	Philippines	luge
Akuoma Omeoga	Nigeria	bobsleigh
Ngozi Onwumere	Nigeria	bobsleigh
Mathilde-Amivi Petitjean	Togo	cross-country skiing
Tallulah Proulx	Philippines	alpine skiing
Ricardo Raschini	Brazil	bobsleigh and luge
Mathieu Razanakolona	Madagascar	alpine skiing
Rusiate Rogoyawa	Fiji	cross-country skiing
Alexia Arisarah Schenkel	Thailand	alpine skiing
Leyti Seck	Senegal	alpine skiing
Sabrina Simader	Kenya	alpine skiing
Luke Steyn	Zimbabwe	alpine skiing
Kanes Sucharitakul	Thailand	alpine skiing
Robel Teklemariam	Ethiopia	cross-country skiing
Michael Teruel	Philippines	alpine skiing
Laurence Thoms	Fiji	alpine skiing
Dow Travers	Cayman Islands	alpine skiing
George Tucker	Puerto Rico	luge
Vanessa Vanakorn	Thailand	alpine skiing
Hubertus von Hohenlohe	Mexico	alpine skiing
Isadora Williams	Brazil	figure skating
Nicola Zanon	Thailand	alpine skiing

== Winter Paralympic Games ==
As of 2026, only five tropical nations have been represented at the Winter Paralympic Games. Tofiri Kibuuka of Uganda competed in para cross-country skiing at the inaugural 1976 edition of the Winter Paralympics and again at the 1980 Games. After Kibuuka obtained Norwegian nationality, he began to compete for Nordic nation starting in 1984, winning several medals in para athletics at the Summer Paralympics. Brazil sent two athletes as part of its debut at the 2014 Winter Paralympics. Puerto Rico sent one athlete as part of its debut at the 2022 edition. El Salvador and Haiti made their debut at the 2026 Winter Paralympics with one athlete each.

At the 2026 edition hosted in Milan and Cortina d'Ampezzo, Brazil earned the first medal for a tropical nation at the Winter Paralympics history – para cross-country skier Cristian Ribera won a silver medal in the Men's sprint - sitting.

=== Medalist from tropical nations ===
Medal	Nation	Name	Paralympics	Sport	Event
Silver	Brazil	Cristian Ribera	(Italy) 2026 Milano-Cortina	Para cross-country skiing	Men's sprint, sitting

Africa
Uganda	1976–1980

Americas
Brazil	2014–2026
El Salvador	2026
Haiti	2026
Puerto Rico	2022–2026

=== Notable Paralympians ===
Name	Nation	Sport
Tofiri Kibuuka	Uganda	Para cross-country skiing
Fernando Aranha	Brazil	Para cross-country skiing
André Cintra	Brazil	Para snowboard cross
Aline Rocha	Brazil	Para cross-country skiing
Cristian Ribera	Brazil	Para cross-country skiing

== Winter Youth Olympic Games ==
Five tropical nations were represented at the First Winter Youth Olympics in Innsbruck, Austria.

In the 2020 edition, Diego Amaya from Colombia won the silver medal in the boys' mass start speed skating. This was the first time in history that an athlete from a tropical nation and a Latin American won a medal at an Olympic winter event. Four years later, Agnese Campeol from Thailand won the silver medal in the women's bobsleigh event, and Zion Bethônico from Brazil won the bronze medal in the men's snowboard cross event.

=== Medalists from tropical nations ===
Medal	Nation	Name	Paralympics	Sport	Event
Silver	Colombia	Diego Amaya	(Switzerland) 2020 Lausanne	Speed skating	Boys' mass start
Silver	Thailand	Agnese Campeol	(South Korea) 2024 Gangwon	Bobsleigh	Women's monobob
Bronze	Brazil	Zion Bethônico	(South Korea) 2024 Gangwon	Snowboarding	Men's snowboard cross

Africa
Eritrea	2012
Kenya	2016–2024
Nigeria	2024
Americas
Brazil	2012–2024
Cayman Islands	2012
Colombia	2016–2024
Ecuador	2020
Haiti	2020
Jamaica	2016–2024
Peru	2012
Trinidad and Tobago	2020
Asia
Hong Kong	2020–2024
Malaysia	2016–2020
Philippines	2012, 2020–2024
Singapore	2020–2024
Thailand	2020–2024
Timor-Leste	2016

== See also ==
- List of participating nations at the Winter Olympic Games
- Tourist athlete
