= List of flag bearers for Nigeria at the Olympics =

Nigeria at the Olympics
- IOC code: NGR
- NOC: Nigeria Olympic Committee
- Website: www.nigeriaolympiccommittee.org
- Medals: Gold 3 Silver 11 Bronze 13 Total 27

Summer appearances
- 1952; 1956; 1960; 1964; 1968; 1972; 1976; 1980; 1984; 1988; 1992; 1996; 2000; 2004; 2008; 2012; 2016; 2020; 2024

Winter appearances
- 2018; 2022; 2026

This is a list of flag bearers who have represented Nigeria at the Olympics.

Flag bearers carry the national flag of their country at the opening ceremony of the Olympic Games.

#	Event year	Season	Flag bearer	Sport	
1	1972	Summer	Benedict Majekodunmi	Athletics	
2	1984	Summer	Yusuf Alli	Athletics	
3	1988	Summer	Yusuf Alli	Athletics	
4	1996	Summer	Mary Onyali-Omagbemi	Athletics	
5	2000	Summer	Sunday Bada	Athletics	
6	2004	Summer	Mary Onyali-Omagbemi	Athletics	
7	2008	Summer	Bose Kaffo	Table Tennis	
8	2012	Summer	Sinivie Boltic	Wrestling	
9	2016	Summer	Olufunke Oshonaike	Table tennis	
10	2018	Winter	Ngozi Onwumere	Bobsleigh	
11	2020	Summer	Odunayo Adekuoroye	Wrestling	
11	2020	Summer	Quadri Aruna	Table tennis	
12	2022	Winter	Seun Adigun	Team official	(Note: Adigun represented Nigeria at the 2018 Winter Olympics in bobsleigh, and was the official team doctor for these games.)
13	2024	Summer	Tobi Amusan	Athletics	
13	2024	Summer	Anuoluwapo Juwon Opeyori	Badminton	

== See also ==
- Nigeria at the Olympics
