= Nigeria bobsled team =

Nigerian Bobsleigh team

- Sport: Bobsledding
- Founded: 2016
- League: International Bobsleigh and Skeleton Federation
- Division: Federation: Bobsled and Skeleton Federation of Nigeria; Country: Nigeria; NOC: Nigeria
- Chairman: Seun Adigun
- Manager: Seun Adigun
- Members: Seun Adigun; Ngozi Onwumere; Akuoma Omeoga

The Nigeria bobsled team or Nigerian bobsleigh team, represents Nigeria in bobsledding. The first team was established in 2016 by Seun Adigun, as a women's team for the 2-women event. In 2017, they qualified to be the first Nigerians at the Winter Olympics, and first Africans in bobsled at the Winter Olympics.

== History ==
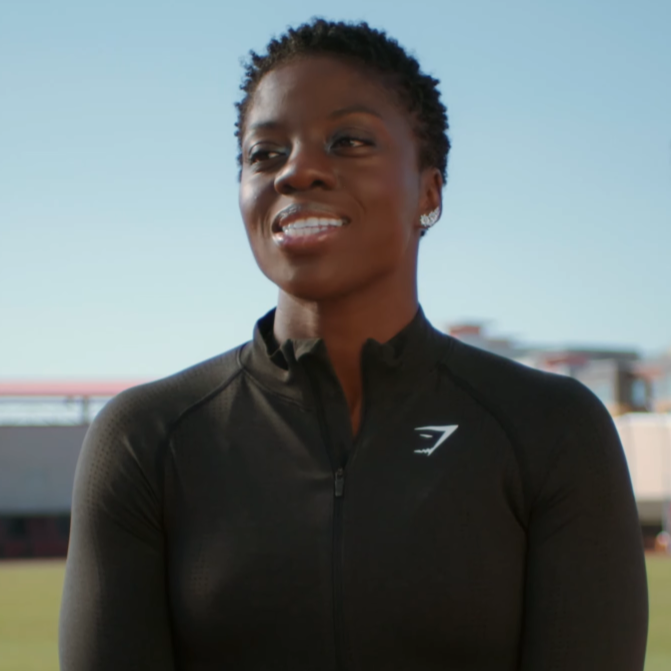
Seun Adigun, the team's founder

The first national team was established in 2016 by Seun Adigun, in 2-woman bobsleigh. The team was entirely self-funding, without financial support from Nigerian authorities. Raising the money to run the team showed the Nigerian government that they needed to establish a governing federation for bobsled, which they did, the Bobsled & Skeleton Federation of Nigeria (BSFN). The team's first attempt to qualify for the Winter Olympics, was in 2017, for the 2018 Winter Olympics in bobsledding, the two-women event. The 2018 Olympic team consisted of driver Seun Adigun, and brakemen Ngozi Onwumere and Akuoma Omeoga. In November 2017, the team met the basic standard to participate in the qualifications. If the team qualifies, this would represent the first appearance of Nigeria at the Winter Olympics; and the first African team in bobsled. The team qualified for the Olympics, being its representatives at the Winter Games. Nigeria became one of eight African countries to be represented at the 2018 Winter Olympics. Onwumere carried the Nigerian flag at the 2018 Winter Olympics opening ceremony Parade of Nations, and marched with her two teammates, along with fellow Nigerian Simidele Adeagbo, who qualified for women's skeleton. The team finished last among the 20 teams who competed. After the Games, the 3 on the team retired from bobsled, but pledged to develop the sport in Nigeria, grow the Nigerian sporting federation, and grow winter sports and the Winter Olympics in Africa.

The team arrived in Nigeria to celebrate their Olympic experience in March 2018, organized by the BSFN marketing team, the Temple Management Company (TMC), starting at Murtala Mohammed International Airport (MMIA) Ikeja Lagos.

== Equipment ==
- Maeflower 1, a training sled built out of wood, named after Amezee Adigun (a.k.a. "Mae-Mae"), Suen Adigun's deceased sister.
- Maeflower 2, the team's first racing sled, which accompanied them to the 2018 Olympics.

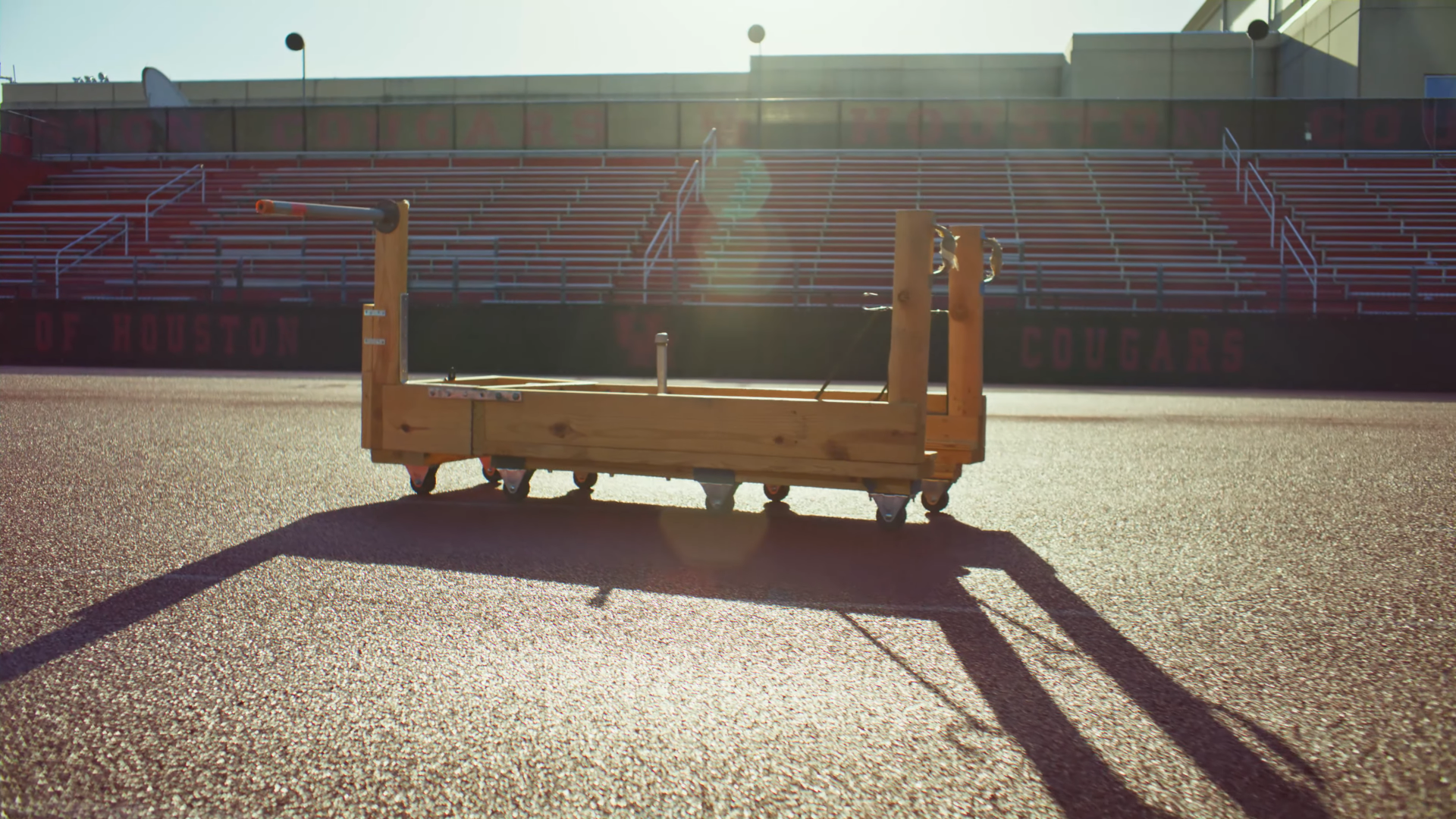
Maeflower 1

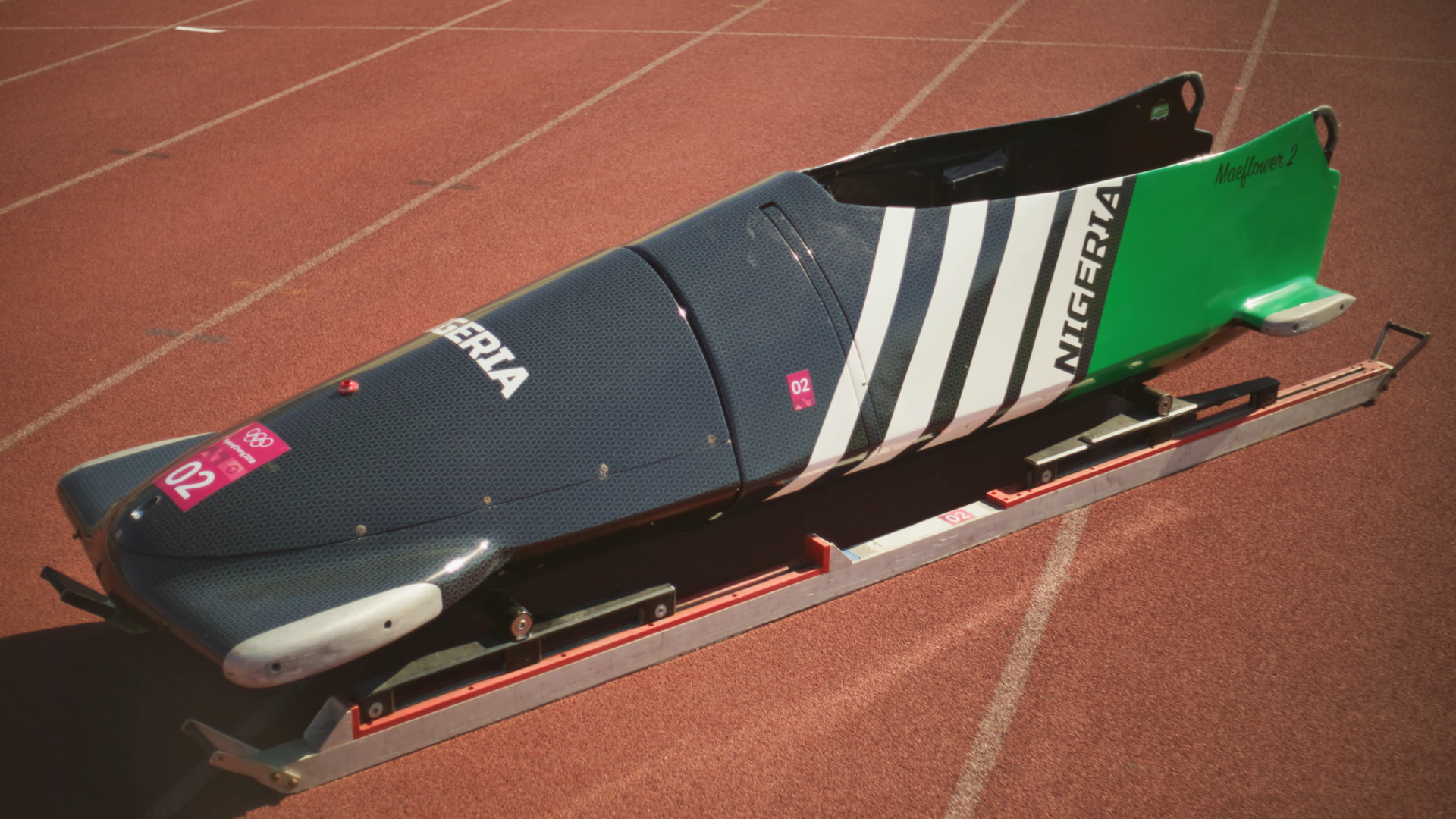
Maeflower 2

== Rosters ==
Event	Competition	Sled-team	Driver(s)	Braker(s)	Pusher(s) (Note: The 2-person sled has a driver and a brake operator, but no pushers, in the 4-person sled, there's a driver, brake operator and two pushers.)	Sled(s)	Notes
2018 Winter Olympics	2-women	Nigeria 1	Seun Adigun	Ngozi Onwumere; Akuoma Omeoga		Maeflower 2	The team finished 20th out of 20 teams, just behind the Jamaican women's team.

== See also ==
- Tropical nations at the Winter Olympics
- Jamaican bobsled team
