= 2018 Winter Olympics Parade of Nations =

During the 2018 Winter Olympics Parade of Nations at the 2018 Winter Olympics opening ceremony, beginning at 20:00 KST (UTC+9) on 9 February 2018, athletes bearing the flags of their respective nations led their national delegations as they paraded into the Pyeongchang Olympic Stadium in the host city of Pyeongchang, South Korea. 92 teams qualified to compete (91 nations and Olympic Athletes from Russia).

== Background ==
Athletes entered the stadium in an order dictated by Olympic tradition. As the originator of the Olympics, the Greek team entered first. Other teams entered in alphabetical order based on the names of countries in the Korean language. Following tradition, the delegation from the host nation, South Korea, was scheduled to enter last. However, following solidarity negotiations with North Korea, the host nation was instead represented by the unified Korean delegation, consisting of the South Korean and North Korean teams, marching under the Korean Unification Flag.

The names of the nations were announced in French, followed by English and Korean, the official languages of the Olympic movement and the host nation, in accordance with traditional and International Olympic Committee (IOC) guidelines. Background music included such Korean songs from throughout the ages from as old as the folk song Arirang, to "Short Hair" by Cho Yong-pil and "The Beauty" by Shin Jung Hyun & Yup Juns of the 1970s, and modern K-pop hits such as "Gangnam Style" by Psy, "Likey" by Twice, "Fantastic Baby" by Big Bang, "DNA" by BTS, and "Red Flavor" by Red Velvet.

== List ==
Below is a list of parading countries and their announced flag bearer, in the same order as the parade. This is sortable by country name, flag bearer's name and flag bearer's sport. Names are given in the form officially designated by the IOC.

Order	Nation	Hangul	Roman Transliteration (in RR)	Flag bearer	Sport
1	Greece	그리스	Geuriseu	Sophia Ralli	Alpine skiing
2	Ghana	가나	Gana	Akwasi Frimpong	Skeleton
3	Nigeria	나이지리아	Naijiria	Ngozi Onwumere	Bobsleigh
4	South Africa	남아프리카 공화국	Nam-Apeurika Gonghwaguk	Connor Wilson	Alpine skiing
5	Netherlands	네덜란드	Nedeollandeu	Jan Smeekens	Speed skating
6	Norway	노르웨이	Noreuwei	Emil Hegle Svendsen	Biathlon
7	New Zealand	뉴질랜드	Nyujillaendeu	Beau-James Wells	Freestyle skiing
8	Denmark	덴마크	Denmakeu	Elena Møller Rigas	Speed skating
9	Germany	독일	Dogil	Eric Frenzel	Nordic combined
10	Timor-Leste	동티모르	Dong-Timoreu	Yohan Goutt Gonçalves	Alpine skiing
11	Latvia	라트비아	Rateubia	Daumants Dreiškens	Bobsleigh
12	Lebanon	레바논	Rebanon	Samer Tawk	Cross-country skiing
13	Romania	루마니아	Rumania	Marius Ungureanu	Biathlon
14	Luxembourg	룩셈부르크	Ruksembureukeu	Matthieu Osch	Alpine skiing
15	Lithuania	리투아니아	Rituania	Tomas Kaukėnas	Biathlon
16	Liechtenstein	리히텐슈타인	Rihitensyutain	Marco Pfiffner	Alpine skiing
17	Madagascar	마다가스카르	Madagaseukareu	Mialitiana Clerc	Alpine skiing
18	Malaysia	말레이시아	Malleisia	Julian Yee	Figure skating
19	Mexico	멕시코	Meksiko	Germán Madrazo	Cross-country skiing
20	Monaco	모나코	Monako	Rudy Rinaldi	Bobsleigh
21	Morocco	모로코	Moroko	Samir Azzimani	Cross-country skiing
22	Montenegro	몬테네그로	Montenegeuro	Jelena Vujičić	Alpine skiing
23	Moldova	몰도바	Moldoba	Nicolae Gaiduc	Cross-country skiing
24	Malta	몰타	Molta	Élise Pellegrin	Alpine skiing
25	Mongolia	몽골	Monggol	Achbadrakh Batmunkh	Cross-country skiing
26	United States	미국	Miguk	Erin Hamlin	Luge
27	Bermuda	버뮤다	Beomyuda	Tucker Murphy	Cross-country skiing
28	Belgium	벨기에	Belgie	Seppe Smits	Snowboarding
29	Belarus	벨라루스	Bellaruseu	Alla Tsuper	Freestyle skiing
30	Bosnia and Herzegovina	보스니아 헤르체고비나	Boseunia Hereuchegobina	Elvedina Muzaferija	Alpine skiing
31	Bolivia	볼리비아	Bollibia	Simon Breitfuss Kammerlander	Alpine skiing
32	Bulgaria	불가리아	Bulgaria	Radoslav Yankov	Snowboarding
33	Brazil	브라질	Beurajil	Edson Bindilatti	Bobsleigh
34	San Marino	산마리노	Sanmarino	Alessandro Mariotti	Alpine skiing
35	Serbia	세르비아	Sereubia	Nevena Ignjatović	Alpine skiing
36	Sweden	스웨덴	Seuweden	Niklas Edin	Curling
37	Switzerland	스위스	Seuwiseu	Dario Cologna	Cross-country skiing
38	Spain	스페인	Seupein	Lucas Eguibar	Snowboarding
39	Slovakia	슬로바키아	Seullobakia	Veronika Velez-Zuzulová	Alpine skiing
40	Slovenia	슬로베니아	Seullobenia	Vesna Fabjan	Cross-country skiing
41	Singapore	싱가포르	Singgaporeu	Cheyenne Goh	Short track speed skating
42	Armenia	아르메니아	Areumenia	Mikayel Mikayelyan	Cross-country skiing
43	Argentina	아르헨티나	Areuhentina	Sebastiano Gastaldi	Alpine skiing
44	Iceland	아이슬란드	Aiseullandeu	Freydis-Halla Einarsdóttir	Alpine skiing
45	Ireland	아일랜드	Aillaendeu	Seamus O'Connor	Snowboarding
46	Azerbaijan	아제르바이잔	Ajereubaijan	Patrick Brachner	Alpine skiing
47	Andorra	안도라	Andora	Irineu Esteve Altimiras	Cross-country skiing
48	Albania	알바니아	Albania	Suela Mehilli	Alpine skiing
49	Eritrea	에리트레아	Eriteurea	Shannon-Ogbnai Abeda	Alpine skiing
50	Estonia	에스토니아	Eseutonia	Saskia Alusalu	Speed skating
51	Ecuador	에콰도르	Ekwadoreu	Klaus Jungbluth	Cross-country skiing
52	Great Britain	영국	Yeongguk	Lizzy Yarnold	Skeleton
53	Australia	오스트레일리아	Oseuteureillia	Scott James	Snowboarding
54	Austria	오스트리아	Oseuteuria	Anna Veith	Alpine skiing
55	Olympic Athletes from Russia (Note: The Olympic Athletes from Russia team was alphabetized under "Olympic" (올림픽 Ollimpik), although in Korean their team name begins with the word "Russia" (러시아 Reosia).)	러시아 출신 올림픽 선수	Reosia Chulsin Ollimpik Seonsu	POCOG Volunteer	N/A
56	Uzbekistan	우즈베키스탄	Ujeubekiseutan	Komiljon Tukhtaev	Alpine skiing
57	Ukraine	우크라이나	Ukeuraina	Olena Pidhrushna	Biathlon
58	Iran	이란	Iran	Samaneh Beyrami Baher	Cross-country skiing
59	Italy	이탈리아	Itallia	Arianna Fontana	Short track speed skating
60	Israel (Note: Italy and Israel switched positions in the parade so that the surrounding order was Iran → Italy → Israel (Hangul alphabetical order would have dictated Iran → Israel → Italy). An IOC spokesperson stated, without elaborating, that this decision "was taken at the time to reflect the appropriate protocols.")	이스라엘	Iseura'el	Alexei Bychenko	Figure skating
61	India	인도	Indo	Shiva Keshavan	Luge
62	Japan	일본	Ilbon	Noriaki Kasai	Ski jumping
63	Jamaica	자메이카	Jameika	Audra Segree	Bobsleigh
64	Georgia	조지아	Jojia	Moris Kvitelashvili	Figure skating
65	China	중국	Jungguk	Zhou Yang	Short track speed skating
66	Czech Republic	체코	Cheko	Eva Samková	Snowboarding
67	Chile	칠레	Chille	Henrik von Appen	Alpine skiing
68	Kazakhstan	카자흐스탄	Kajaheuseutan	Abzal Azhgaliyev	Short track speed skating
69	Canada	캐나다	Kaenada	Tessa Virtue & Scott Moir	Figure skating
70	Kenya	케냐	Kenya	Sabrina Simader	Alpine skiing
71	Kosovo	코소보	Kosobo	Albin Tahiri	Alpine skiing
72	Colombia	콜롬비아	Kollombia	Pedro Causil	Speed skating
73	Croatia	크로아티아	Keuroatia	Natko Zrnčić-Dim	Alpine skiing
74	Kyrgyzstan	키르기스스탄	Kireugiseuseutan	Tariel Zharkymbaev	Cross-country skiing
75	Cyprus	키프로스	Kipeuroseu	Dinos Lefkaritis	Alpine skiing
76	Chinese Taipei	차이니스 타이베이	Chainiseu Taibei	Lien Te-an	Luge
77	Thailand	태국	Taeguk	Mark Chanloung	Cross-country skiing
78	Turkey	터키	Teoki	Fatih Arda İpcioğlu	Ski jumping
79	Togo	토고	Togo	Mathilde-Amivi Petitjean	Cross-country skiing
80	Tonga	통가	Tongga	Pita Taufatofua	Cross-country skiing
81	Pakistan	파키스탄	Pakiseutan	Muhammad Karim	Alpine skiing
82	Portugal	포르투갈	Poreutugal	Kequyen Lam	Cross-country skiing
83	Poland	폴란드	Pollandeu	Zbigniew Bródka	Speed skating
84	Puerto Rico	푸에르토리코	Puereutoriko	Charles Flaherty	Alpine skiing
85	France	프랑스	Peurangseu	Martin Fourcade	Biathlon
86	Macedonia (Note: Macedonia entered as its official name "the former Yugoslav Republic of Macedonia" in all languages, but paraded as if its name were "FYROM" (피롬 Pirom), between France and Finland. If it were ordered with the word "former" (구 gu), it would have marched third after Ghana.)	구유고슬라비아 마케도니아 공화국	Gu-Yugoseullabia Makedonia Gonghwaguk	Stavre Jada	Cross-country skiing
87	Finland	핀란드	Pillandeu	Janne Ahonen	Ski jumping
88	Philippines	필리핀	Pillipin	Asa Miller	Alpine skiing
89	Hungary	헝가리	Heonggari	Konrád Nagy	Speed skating
90	Hong Kong	홍콩차이나	Hongkong Chaina	Arabella Ng	Alpine skiing
91	Korea	코리아	Koria	Won Yun-jong (South Korea)	Bobsleigh
91	Korea	코리아	Koria	Hwang Chung-gum (North Korea)	Ice hockey

== See also ==
- 2018 Winter Paralympics Parade of Nations
