= White Dominicans (Dominica) =

- Flag of Dominica under British rule

Total population
- 586; 0.8% of the Dominican population (2013)

Languages
- English, Antillean Creole French

Religion
- Predominantly Roman Catholicism, minority Protestantism

Related ethnic groups
- English, French, other White Caribbeans

As of 2013, people of solely European descent are a small minority in the Commonwealth of Dominica, comprising only 0.8% of the population.

Most White Dominicans are descendants of European settlers of French and English stock.

== History ==
Christopher Columbus landed in Dominica in November 1493. Spanish ships frequently landed on Dominica during the 16th century, but fierce resistance by the indigenous Caribs discouraged Spain's efforts at settlement in the island. In 1635, France officially claimed Dominica. Dominica was colonized by the Spanish, French and English. The first Europeans colonists in Dominica were the French. Winds and tides made Dominica the first landfall for numerous sailing ships arriving in the West Indies from the Azores, the Canary Islands, and West Africa. Spanish ships called for water and provisions, but hostile Caribs discouraged colonization. During the seventeenth, eighteenth and early nineteenth centuries, the Caribs, the British and the French fought for control of Dominica. The European settlers in Dominica between 1632 and 1748 were predominantly French. Situated almost equidistant from France's colonies of Guadeloupe and Martinique, Dominica had more than 300 African slaves by 1633. England had also claimed the island. In 1660 and 1731, Dominica was declared "neutral" in an effort to resolve the conflicting European assertions and to appease Carib raiders. Again, by the Treaty of Aix-la-Chapelle of 1748, the British and French pledged to abandon the disputed territory. Even if both nations sincerely had desired to adhere to these pacts, enforcement would have proven difficult. War rather than diplomacy ultimately settled the question of possession.

French colonists arrived in increasing numbers. Their failure to evacuate helped precipitate the Seven Years' War (1755–1763) between England and France. In 1759, when the English seized Guadeloupe, the French presence on Dominica grew dramatically. The Caribs were driven to the remote areas, where their descendants still survive. Britain reacted in 1761 by assaulting and capturing the island. The Treaty of Paris of 1763 confirmed the conquest. Between 1764 and 1774 both the white and black populations increased. Approximately 19,000 slaves entered Dominica during the same period. In 1763 blacks outnumbered whites three to one. By 1811 the ratio had climbed to sixteen to one. Even today, whites comprise a small minority of Dominica's population.

In the year 1715, France established the first permanent settlement in the island with groups of poor European smallholders from Martinique.

== Notable people ==
- Henry Alfred Alford Nicholls (1851–1926), physician
- Jean Rhys (1890–1970), novelist
- Elma Napier (1892–1973), writer and politician
- Phyllis Shand Allfrey (1908–1986), writer and social activist
- Gary di Silvestri (born 1967), cross-country skier
- Angelica di Silvestri (born 1965), cross-country skier
- Steve Agar (born 1968), track and field athlete

== See also ==
- Afro-Dominican (Dominica)
