= Ecuador at the 2022 Winter Olympics =

- Flag of Ecuador
- IOC code: ECU
- NOC: Ecuadorian National Olympic Committee
- Website: www.coe.org.ec (in Spanish)

in Beijing, China February 4–20, 2022
- Competitors: 1 (0 men and 1 woman) in 1 sport
- Flag bearer (opening): Sarah Escobar
- Flag bearer (closing): Volunteer
- Medals: Gold 0 Silver 0 Bronze 0 Total 0

Winter Olympics appearances (overview)
- 2018; 2022; 2026

Ecuador competed at the 2022 Winter Olympics in Beijing, China, from 4 to 20 February 2022. It was the territory's second consecutive appearance at the Winter Olympics, since its debut at the previous 2018 Winter Olympics in Pyeongchang. The Ecuador delegation consisted of two athletes competing in two sports. It did not win any medals at the Games.

== Background ==
Ecuador sent three athletes to the 1924 Summer Olympics and the Ecuadorian National Olympic Committee was formed in 1925. The Ecuadorian National Olympic Committee was recognized by the International Olympic Committee (IOC) in 1959. The nation made its first Winter Olympic appearance at the 2018 Winter Olympics in Pyeongchang, and the 2022 Winter Olympics was the nation's second consecutive appearance at the Winter Olympics.

The 2022 Winter Olympics was held in Beijing, China, between 4 and 22 February 2022. Alpine skier Sarah Escobar was the flagbearer during the opening ceremony. Meanwhile, a volunteer was the flagbearer during the closing ceremony. Ecuador did not win a medal at the Games.

== Competitors ==
The Ecuador team consists of a single athlete, Sarah Escobar.

Sport	Men	Women	Total
Alpine skiing	0	1	1
Total	0	1	1

== Alpine skiing ==
The basic qualification mark for the slalom and giant slalom events stipulated an average of less than 160 points in the list published by the International Ski Federation (FIS) as on 17 January 2022. The quotas were allocated further based on athletes satisfying other criteria with a maximum of 22 athletes (11 male and 11 female athletes) from a single participating NOC. Ecuadorian alpine skier Sarah Escobar met the basic qualification standard in the giant slalom category. Subject to the other criteria, Escobar qualified to participate at the games.

Sarah Escobar is a first generation American skier born in New York state. She decided to compete for her parents' birth country of Ecuador. Escobar had previously represented Ecuador at the 2020 Winter Youth Olympics in Lausanne, Switzerland. This marked the country's debut in the sport at the Winter Olympics.

In the giant slalom event held on 7 February 2022 at the Yanqing National Alpine Skiing Centre, Escobar completed her first run in 1:21.26 to rank 61th amongst the 80 competitors. She did not complete her second run and hence was not classified in the overall classification.

Athlete	Event	Run 1		Run 2		Total	
Athlete	Event	Time	Rank	Time	Rank	Time	Rank
Sarah Escobar	Women's giant slalom	1:21.26	61	DNF			

== See also ==
- Tropical nations at the Winter Olympics
- Ecuador at the 2020 Winter Youth Olympics
