= Nigeria at the 2022 Winter Olympics =

- Flag of Nigeria
- IOC code: NGR
- NOC: Nigeria Olympic Committee
- Website: nigeriaolympic.org

in Beijing, China 4 to 20 February 2022
- Competitors: 1 (1 man and 0 women) in 1 sport
- Flag bearer (opening): Seun Adigun
- Flag bearer (closing): Samuel Ikpefan
- Medals: Gold 0 Silver 0 Bronze 0 Total 0

Winter Olympics appearances (overview)
- 2018; 2022; 2026

Nigeria competed at the 2022 Winter Olympics in Beijing, China, from 4 to 20 February 2022.

Nigeria's team consisted of one male athlete in cross-country skiing. Seun Adigun, who represented the country in 2018 in the sport of bobsleigh, carried the flag of the country during the opening ceremony. Adigun was at the games as the team's doctor. Meanwhile cross-country skier Samuel Ikpefan was the flagbearer during the closing ceremony.

== Competitors ==
The following is the list of number of competitors participating at the Games per sport/discipline.

Sport	Men	Women	Total
Cross-country skiing	1	0	1
Total	1	0	1

== Cross-country skiing ==
By meeting the basic qualification standards, Nigeria qualified one male cross-country skier. This will mark the sport debut for the country at the Winter Olympics. Samuel Ikpefan is scheduled to represent the country in the sport. Ikpefan is a French born skier, and decided to represent the birth nation of his father in international competition.

Ikpefan competed in two events. In his first event, the men's sprint, Ikpefan had a time of 3:09.57 to finish 73rd out of 88 competitors, failing to advance to the next round.

Distance

Athlete	Event	Final		
Athlete	Event	Time	Deficit	Rank
Samuel Ikpefan	Men's 15 km classical	did not finish		

Sprint

Athlete	Event	Qualification		Quarterfinal		Semifinal		Final	
Athlete	Event	Time	Rank	Time	Rank	Time	Rank	Time	Rank
Samuel Ikpefan	Men's sprint	3:09.57	73	did not advance					

== See also ==
- Tropical nations at the Winter Olympics
- Nigeria at the 2022 Commonwealth Games
