= Cross-country skiing at the 2014 Winter Olympics – Qualification =

The following is about the qualification rules and the quota allocation for the cross-country skiing at the 2014 Winter Olympics.

== Qualification Rules ==
=== Quotas ===
A total of 310 athletes are allowed to compete at the Games. A maximum of 20 athletes per nation will be allowed to compete with a maximum of 12 males or 12 females from a nation being permitted.

=== A Standard ===
An athlete with a maximum of 100 FIS distance points will be allowed to compete in both or one of the event (sprint/distance). An athlete with a maximum 120 FIS sprint points will be allowed to compete in the sprint event and 10 km for women or 15 km for men provided their distance points does not exceed 300 FIS points.

=== B Standard ===
NOC's who do not have any athlete meeting the A standard can enter one competitor of each sex (known as the basic quota) in the sprint event or 10 km classical event for women/15 km classical event for men. They must have a maximum of 300 FIS distance points at the end of qualifying on January 20, 2014. The qualification period begins in July 2012.

=== Allocation of quotas ===
Basic Quota

Every NOC will be assigned one male and one female quota spot meeting the B standard.

Top 300 on Points list

Every NOC with at least one male and/or female in the top 300 of any event will be allocated one additional male and/or female quota in addition to the basic quota.

Top 30 on Points list

Every NOC with at least one male and/or female in the top 30 of any event will be allocated one additional male and/or female quota in addition to the basic quota top 500 and 100 quota. If an NOC has two or more fitting this criterion it will be given an additional quota.

Remaining quotas

The remaining quotas will be assigned using the Olympic Quota allocation list on January 20, 2014. The spots will be assigned until a maximum of 310 quotas are reached including the above. When a nation reaches its maximum, remaining athletes from that country will be skipped over. The list is a table of athletes in the top 500 in both events (distance and sprint).

An athlete can be counted only once for the above three criteria. For example, if a country has only one athlete meeting all three criteria then only one quota will be given (not 3).

== Quota allocation ==
This is the Olympic allocation quota.

=== Current summary ===
Nations	Men	Women	Additional	Athletes
Argentina	1			1
Armenia	2	1		3
Australia	2	2		4
Austria	4	2	2	8
Belarus	2	2	2	6
Bermuda	1			1
Bosnia and Herzegovina	1	1		2
Brazil	1	1		2
Bulgaria	2	2		4
Canada	4	3	6	13
Chile	1			1
China	2	2		4
Croatia	1	1		2
Czech Republic	3	3	4	10
Denmark	1			1
Dominica	1	1		2
Estonia	2	2	3	7
Finland	4	4	9	17
France	3	4	8	15
Germany	4	4	10	18
Great Britain	2	2		4
Greece	1	1		2
Hungary	1	1		2
Iceland	1			1
Independent Olympic Athletes	1			1
Iran	1	1		2
Ireland	1			1
Italy	4	4	8	16
Japan	2	3	1	6
Kazakhstan	4	2	5	11
Latvia	2	1		3
Liechtenstein	1			1
Lithuania	1	1		2
Luxembourg	1			1
Macedonia	1	1		2
Moldova	1	1		2
Mongolia	1	1		2
Nepal	1			1
Norway	4	4	12	20
Peru	1			1
Poland	2	3	5	10
Romania	2	1		3
Russia	4	4	12	20
Slovakia	2	2		4
Slovenia		4	1	5
South Korea	1	1		2
Serbia	2	1		3
Spain	2	1		3
Sweden	4	4	11	19
Switzerland	4	3	7	14
Togo		1		1
Turkey	1	1		2
Ukraine	2	3	3	8
United States	4	4	6	14
Total: 54 NOCs	104	91	115	310

=== Men ===
Criteria	Athletes per NOC	Total Athletes	Qualified
Top 300, Basic quota + 2 spots in top 30	4	44	Austria; Canada; Finland; Germany; Italy; Kazakhstan; Norway; Russia; Switzerland; Sweden; United States
Top 300, Basic quota + 1 spot in top 30	3	6	Czech Republic; France
Top 300, Basic quota	2	30	Armenia; Australia; Belarus; Bulgaria; China; Estonia; Great Britain; Japan; Latvia; Poland; Romania; Serbia; Slovakia; ~~Slovenia~~; Spain; Ukraine
Basic quota	1	24	Argentina; Bermuda; Bosnia and Herzegovina; Brazil; Chile; Croatia; Denmark; Dominica; Greece; Hungary; Iceland; Independent Olympic Athletes; Iran; Ireland; Liechtenstein; Lithuania; Luxembourg; Macedonia; Moldova; Mongolia; Nepal; Peru; South Korea; Turkey; ~~Algeria~~; ~~Andorra~~; ~~New Zealand~~
TOTAL		104	

=== Women ===
Criteria	Athletes per NOC	Total Athletes	Qualified
Top 300, Basic quota + 2 spots in top 30	4	36	Finland; France; Germany; Italy; Norway; Russia; Slovenia; Sweden; United States
Top 300, Basic quota + 1 spot in top 30	3	18	Canada; Czech Republic; Japan; Poland; Switzerland; Ukraine
Top 300, Basic quota	2	18	Australia; Austria; Belarus; Bulgaria; China; Estonia; Great Britain; Kazakhstan; Slovakia
Basic quota	1	19	Armenia; Bosnia and Herzegovina; Brazil; Croatia; Dominica; Greece; Hungary; Iran; Latvia; Lithuania; Macedonia; Moldova; Mongolia; Romania; Serbia; South Korea; Spain; Togo; Turkey; ~~Denmark~~; ~~Netherlands~~; ~~New Zealand~~
TOTAL		91	

=== Remaining Quotas ===
Athletes per NOC	Total	Qualified
12	24	Norway; Russia
11	11	Sweden
10	10	Germany
9	9	Finland
8	16	Italy; France
7	7	Switzerland
6	~~6~~ 12	Canada; United States
5	10	Kazakhstan; Poland
4	4	Czech Republic
3	6	Ukraine; Estonia
2	4	Austria; Belarus
1	2	Japan; Slovenia
TOTAL	115	

=== Next eligible NOC per event ===
If a country rejects a quota spot then additional quotas become available. Countries in bold indicate that country received a rejected quota spot. Here are the top 42 eligible countries per event. Note: a country can be eligible for more than one quota spot in the reallocation process. Countries in bold have gotten a reallocation of a quota spot in the respective event, a country with a strike means they rejected that quota spot.

Country	~~Italy~~; ~~Italy~~; **France**; **Ukraine**; ~~Japan~~; **Canada**; ~~Japan~~; **Poland**; ~~Austria~~; ~~Italy~~; ~~Japan~~; ~~Italy~~; ~~Austria~~; ~~Austria~~; **Switzerland**; **Kazakhstan**; **Ukraine**; **Canada**; ~~Canada~~; **Kazakhstan**; ~~United States~~; **Czech Republic**; **France**; **Estonia**; ~~Canada~~; **Switzerland**; ~~France~~; ~~Switzerland~~; ~~Canada~~; ~~France~~; ~~Switzerland~~; ~~United States~~; ~~United States~~; ~~Slovenia~~; **Kazakhstan**; ~~Switzerland~~; ~~Austria~~; **Poland**; ~~China~~; **Belarus**; **Ukraine**; **Kazakhstan**; **Estonia**
