= Ecuador at the 2026 Winter Olympics =

- Flag of Ecuador
- IOC code: ECU
- NOC: Ecuadorian National Olympic Committee
- Website: www.coe.org.ec (in Spanish)

in Milan and Cortina d'Ampezzo, Italy 6 February 2026 – 22 February 2026
- Competitors: 1 (1 man) in 1 sport
- Flag bearer (opening): Klaus Jungbluth
- Flag bearer (closing): Volunteer
- Medals: Gold 0 Silver 0 Bronze 0 Total 0

Winter Olympics appearances (overview)
- 2018; 2022; 2026

Ecuador competed at the 2026 Winter Olympics in Milan and Cortina d'Ampezzo, Italy, from 6 to 22 February 2026.

Cross-country skier Klaus Jungbluth was the country's flagbearer during the opening ceremony. Meanwhile, a volunteer was the country's flagbearer during the closing ceremony.

== Competitors ==
The following is the list of number of competitors participating at the Games per sport/discipline.

| Sport | Men | Women | Total |
|---|---|---|---|
| Cross-country skiing | 1 | 0 | 1 |
| Total | 1 | 0 | 1 |

== Cross-country skiing ==
Following the completion of the 2025–26 FIS Cross-Country World Cup in the first World Cup period (28 November – 14 December 2025), Ecuador qualified one male athlete.

Distance

| Athlete | Event | Final | | |
| Athlete | Event | Time | Deficit | Rank |
|---|---|---|---|---|
| Klaus Jungbluth | Men's 10 km freestyle | 31:34.5 | 10:58.3 | 111 |
