= Tourist athlete =

Athletes qualifying for events non-competitively

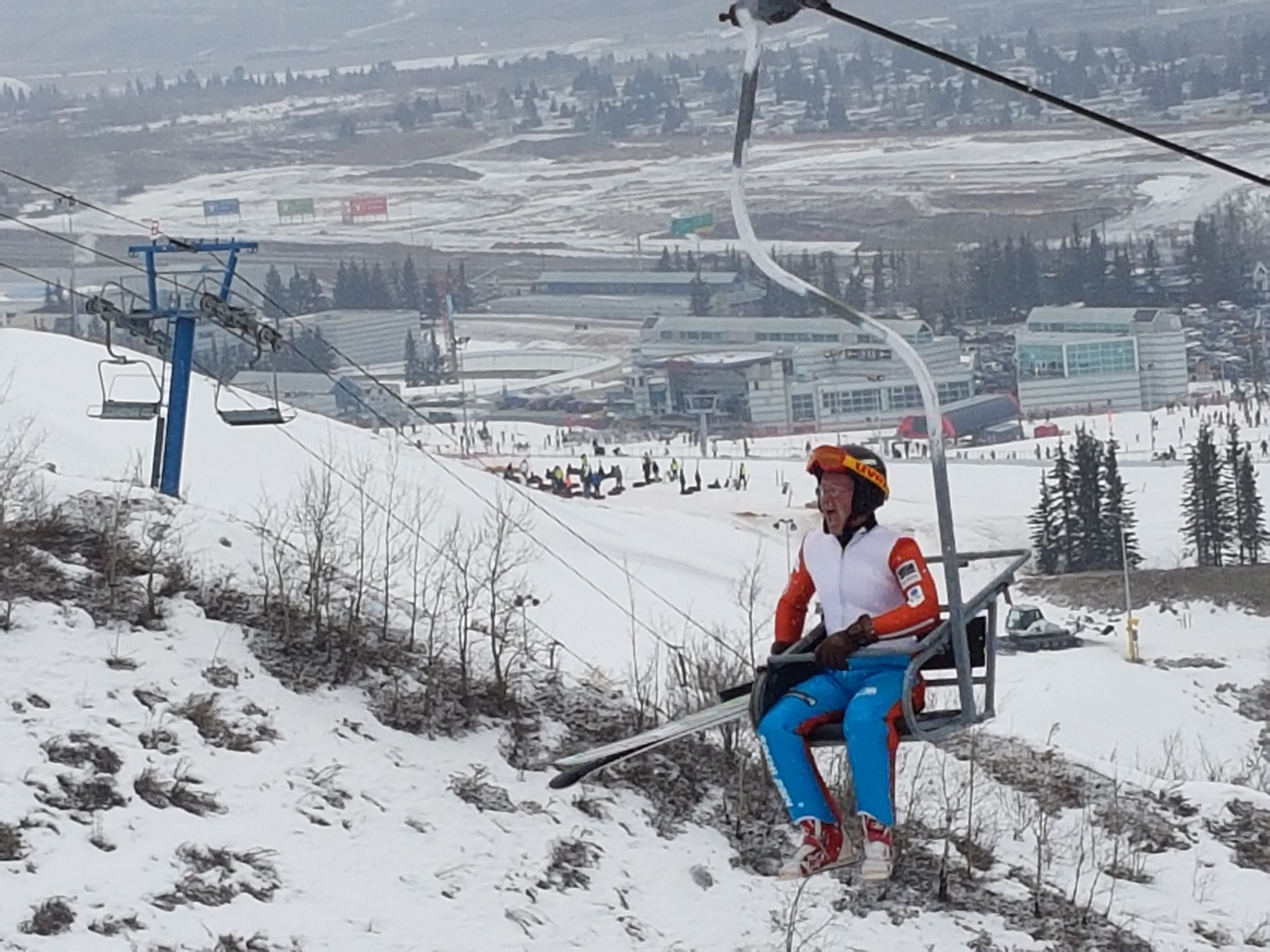
Eddie the Eagle, considered by some to be the archetypal "tourist athlete"

Tourist athlete, also Olympic tourist, is a term for athletes who attend events, particularly the Winter Olympics, without having qualified to be there competitively.

== History ==
=== Development of the issue ===
The Olympic games were originally an amateur event when they began in 1896, though they became increasingly professionalised in the second half of the 20th century. Additionally, as the 20th century went on, more countries joined the Olympic Movement, each of which could send at least one athlete to take part in an event without being qualified for it by performance or capability. For non-alpine countries, this meant that athletes could be selected to compete at the Winter Olympics as part of national teams who were essentially amateur athletes with minimal or even no record of taking part in competitive events.

Particularly in the 1980s and early 1990s, this created a conflict between more professional athletes from alpine countries who qualified for events competitively, and competitors representing non-alpine countries without having qualified competitively and as such were labelled "tourist athletes". These athletes are perceived to have qualified by exploiting relaxed nationality and qualification standards for smaller countries, particularly those of the Caribbean. They are also typically older than most other competitors, and either not born in the country they represent, or do not live there.

During the 1980s, the case of Jamil El Reedy, the Jamaican bobsled team, and Eddie "The Eagle" Edwards, brought particular attention to this phenomenon. So-called "tourist athletes" were perceived as being unsafe and comical, and their presence potential unfair to competitive athletes who failed to qualify for the games. According to Bengt-Erik Bengtsson, head of the Nordic division of the International Ski Federation, the way in which Eddie "The Eagle" Edwards had distracted away from the achievement of other athletes at the 1988 games had been concerning. "No one cared about 1, 2, 3 ... They wanted Eddie" said Bengtsson. In the 1992 winter games, an incident in the slalom where one skier passed another in spite of the 30-second gap between starters was considered the last straw by officials.

=== Rule changes ===
In response to this the qualification rules for the 1994 games were changed to be stricter, preventing every country from automatically qualifying one athlete for each event. Instead, in alpine skiing for example, entrants had to be amongst the world's top 500 men or top 600 women, or (if these standards could not be met by any of the country's athletes) at least one in the top 1,500 alpine skiing athletes worldwide. Other sports, such as cross-country skiing, bobsledding and luge, introduced a requirement that competitors must first compete in a minimum number of international competitions to qualify for the games.

Following this tightening of qualification rules, the problem of "tourist athletes" was reduced in most fields, but cases of athletes attending the winter games who were perceived as having got there by exploiting the rules continued. Gary and Angelica di Silvestri, born in the USA and Italy respectively, who attended the 2014 Winter Olympics representing Dominica after obtaining Dominican citizenship by making substantial donations to that country, were described by Olympic historian Bill Mallon as "classic Olympic tourists."

== See also ==
- List of uncompetitive athletes
- Tropical nations at the Winter Olympics
