= Texas Chiropractic College =

Coordinates: 29.664102°N 95.149801°W

- Former name: Texas College of Chiropractic
- Type: Private
- Established: 1908
- Founder: John N. Stone
- President: Sandra K. Hughes
- Doctoral students: ~300 (2017)
- Location: Pasadena, Texas, United States
- Website: www.txchiro.edu

Texas Chiropractic College (TCC) is a private chiropractic college in Pasadena, Texas. Founded in 1908, it is the fourth-oldest chiropractic college in the United States. TCC was originally located in San Antonio, Texas before moving in 1965 to Pasadena due to increased demands for a larger campus.

== Notable alumni ==
- Gerry E. Hinton (1930–2000), a chiropractor in Slidell who worked to obtain chiropractic licensing while Louisiana State Senator.
- Seun Adigun (born 1987), Olympic sportswoman who represented Nigeria in athletics and bobsledding before becoming a chiropractor.
