= Akuoma Omeoga =

Nigerian bobsledder

Personal information
- Nationality: Nigerian, American
- Born: 22 June 1992 (age 32); Saint Paul, Minnesota, United States

Sport
- Sport: Bobsleigh

Akuoma Ugo Tracy Omeoga (born 22 June 1992) is a Nigerian–American bobsledder. She competed for the Nigeria contingent on the Nigeria bobsled team in the two-woman event at the 2018 Winter Olympics. Omegoa was born in Saint Paul, Minnesota, her parents had moved from Nigeria to the United States to attend school. Later in her life, Omeoga attended the University of Minnesota.
