= Samuel Ikpefan =

French-Nigerian cross-country skier

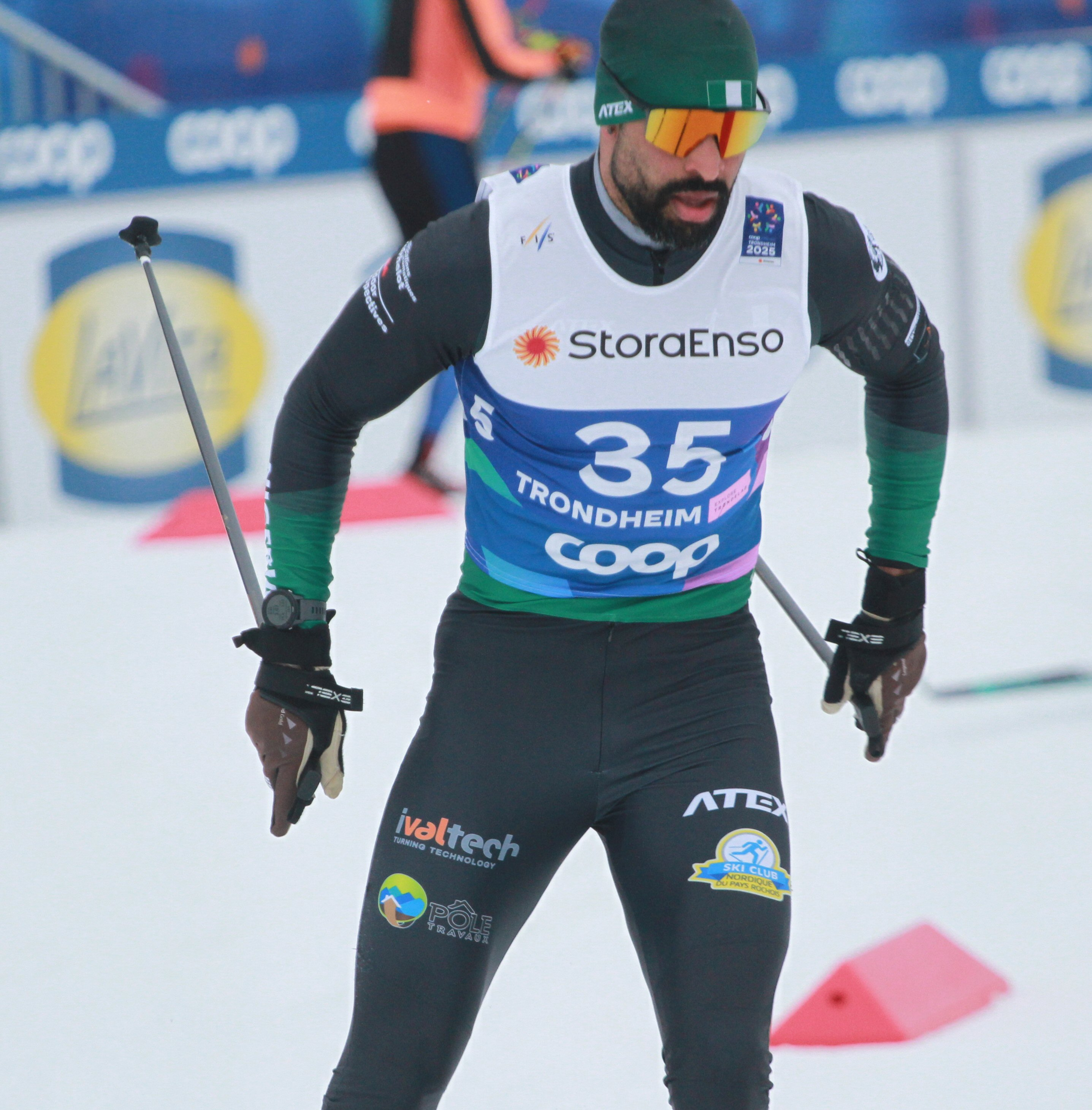
- Ikpefan in 2025

Personal information
- Full name: Samuel Uduigowme Ikpefan
- Nationality: Nigeria
- Born: 19 December 1991 (age 34) Annemasse, France

Sport
- Sport: Cross-country skiing

Samuel Uduigowme Ikpefan (born 19 December 1991 in Annemasse) is a French-Nigerian cross-country skier who represents the club Ski Club Nordique Pays Rochois. He represented Nigeria at the 2022 Winter Olympics and 2026 Winter Olympics.

== Background ==
Ikpefan was born in Annemasse in the French Alps and has a Nigerian father and a French mother. He comes from a “sports family”: his father competed in athletics at the 1970 British Commonwealth Games, his brother plays professional rugby, and his sister plays handball and rugby and is a five-time French champion in rugby with the team Montpellier.

He became French junior champion in cross-country sprint, but retired in 2011 after failing to secure a place on the French national cross-country team. Five years later he made a comeback, and in 2018 he obtained a Nigerian passport, allowing him to compete internationally for Nigeria.

== Sports career ==
Ikpefan competed in his first FIS race in December 2019, finishing 26th in the 15 km classical. He competed in the Alpen Cup 2019/20 but scored no overall points, and also scored no points in Alpen Cup 2020/21. His best individual result in the Alpen Cup is a 52nd place in sprint from January 2020. He made his World Cup debut on 29 January 2021 in Falun, finishing 77th in the 15 km classical, and 73rd in the subsequent sprint at the same venue. He competed at the FIS Nordic World Ski Championships 2021, finishing 80th in the sprint and 110th in the 15 km freestyle.

Ikpefan competed in the men’s sprint at the 2022 Winter Olympics, finishing 73rd in qualification and did not advance to the quarterfinals.
