= Ecuador at the 2018 Winter Olympics =

- Flag of Ecuador
- IOC code: ECU
- NOC: Ecuadorian National Olympic Committee
- Website: www.coe.org.ec (in Spanish)

in Pyeongchang, South Korea February 9–25, 2018
- Competitors: 1 in 1 sport
- Flag bearers: Klaus Jungbluth Rodriguez (opening & closing)
- Medals: Gold 0 Silver 0 Bronze 0 Total 0

Winter Olympics appearances (overview)
- 2018; 2022; 2026

Ecuador competed at the 2018 Winter Olympics in Pyeongchang, South Korea, from 9 to 25 February 2018. The country's participation in Pyeongchang marked its debut in the Winter Olympics.

Ecuador was represented by a lone athlete Klaus Jungbluth Rodriguez, who served as the country's flag-bearer during the opening and closing ceremony. Ecuador did not win any medals in the Games.

== Background ==
The Ecuadorian National Olympic Committee was recognized by the International Olympic Committee in 1959. The nation made its first Olympics appearance at the 1924 Summer Olympics. The current edition marked its debut appearance at the Winter Olympics.

The 2018 Winter Olympics were held in Pyeongchang, South Korea between 9 and 25 February 2018. Ecuador was represented by a lone athlete. Klaus Jungbluth Rodriguez served as the country's flag-bearer during the opening, and closing ceremony. He did not win a medal.

== Competitors ==
The only competitor was cross-country skier Klaus Jungbluth Rodriguez.

Sport	Men	Women	Total
Cross-country skiing	1	0	1
Total	1	0	1

== Cross-country skiing ==
Ecuador qualified one male cross-country skier. In 2016, Jungbluth sought and received the help of the Ecuadorian National Olympic Committee to create a ski federation for Ecuador, which allowed him to compete for the country. Jungbluth lives and trains in Mountain Creek, Queensland, Australia. Jungbluth is the first athlete from Ecuador to compete at the Winter Olympics.

The main event was held at the Alpensia Cross-Country Centre, Alpensia Resort, Mountain Cluster, Daegwallyeong on 16 February 2018. In the Men's 15 km freestyle event, Rodriguez finished 112th amongst the 119 competitors, after finishing more than 19 minutes behind the winner Dario Cologna of Switzerland.

Distance

Athlete	Event	Final		
Athlete	Event	Time	Deficit	Rank
Klaus Jungbluth Rodríguez	Men's 15 km freestyle	53:30.1	+19:46.2	112

== See also ==
- Ecuador at the 2018 Summer Youth Olympics
