= Simidele Adeagbo =

Nigerian skeleton racer

Simidele Adeagbo OLY
Personal information
- Nationality: Canada; Nigeria
- Born: Simidele Adeife Omonla Adeagbo; July 29, 1981 (age 44) Toronto, Ontario, Canada
- Height: 1.70 m (5 ft 7 in)
- Weight: 65 kg (143 lb)

Sport
- Country: Nigeria; United States
- Sport: Track & Field; Skeleton
- Events: Triple Jump; Skeleton
- University team: University of Kentucky
- Coached by: Nick Vienneau

Achievements and titles
- Olympic finals: 20th (Pyeongchang 2018)
- Regional finals: 2022 Woman's Monobob World Series; UK Scholar Athlete of the Year, 2003 Indoor Southeastern Triple Jump Champion
- National finals: Olympic Trials Finalist 2004 & 2008 (Triple Jump), 4 Time NCAA all American in the Triple Jump and Academic All-American,
- Highest world ranking: 74
- Personal bests: Track and Field (Triple Jump) 13.99m (June 27, 2008)

Simidele Adeife Omonla Adeagbo, OLY (born July 29, 1981, in Toronto, Ontario, Canada) is a Nigerian skeleton racer who competed at the 2018 Winter Olympics. She is Nigeria and Africa's first female skeleton athlete. She was the first black female Olympian in the sport. In 2022, she won the woman's mono bob event in the 2022 EuroCup, held in Germany. In so doing, she became the first athlete from Africa to win an international sled race. Before competing in skeleton, Adeagbo competed in triple jump, last competing in 2008.

== Early life ==
Adeagbo was born in Toronto, in Ontario, Canada, to Nigerian parents. She moved to Ibadan, Nigeria when she was an infant, and lived there for six years before moving to the United States.

== Career ==
Adeagbo served as a Nike body double for Serena Williams. Adeagbo is a marketing manager for Nike in South Africa since 2012.

On August 18, 2018, Adeagbo spoke alongside other noteworthy speakers, to a sold-out audience during the TEDxLagos spotlight event at the Muson Centre. She shared the stage with legal practitioner Supo Shasore, Award-winning technologist Ade Olufeko, Art curator Tokini Peterside and media personality Banky W. amongst others.

== Sports career ==
Adeagbo started Track and Field competition in highschool. She retired from Track and Field competition in June 2008. At that time, she failed to qualify for the Olympics by 8-inches. She had become a 4-time NCAA All-American, and was the triple jump record holder for the University of Kentucky.

Adeagbo became interested in skeleton in December 2016, when she heard about the Nigeria bobsled team attempting to qualify for the Olympics. She first tried to qualify for that team at tryouts in July 2017, where she had to try in a skeleton sled instead of a bobsled. She started skeleton in September 2017. She became sponsored by her employer, Nike, for skeleton.

Adeagbo competed at her first Olympics at the 2018 Winter Olympics in skeleton, as part of the Nigerian team, becoming the first Nigerian to compete at the Winter Olympics. She was the Nigerian flagbearer at the 2018 Winter Olympics closing ceremony.

== Personal bests ==
=== Track and field ===
Event	Result	Venue	Date
Outdoor
100 meters	12.05 (wind: +1.7)	Baton Rouge, Louisiana	13 May 2000
100 meters	11.96 (wind: +3.1)	Coral Gables, Florida	17 Mar 2001
Long jump	6.20 m A (wind: +0.9 m/s)	Eugene, Oregon	19 Jun 2004
Long jump	6.36 m A (wind: +4.9 m/s)	Austin, Texas	06 Apr 2001
Triple jump	13.99 m A (wind: +2.0 m/s)	Eugene, OR	27 Jun 2008
Indoor
60 meters	7.59	Lexington	13 Jan 2001
Long jump	6.25 m	Nampa, Idaho	28 Jan 2005
Triple jump	13.40 m	Seattle	28 Jan 2006
