= Nigeria at the 2018 Winter Olympics =

- IOC code: NGR
- NOC: Nigeria Olympic Committee
- Website: nigeriaolympic.org

in Pyeongchang, South Korea 9–25 February 2018
- Competitors: 4 in 2 sports
- Flag bearer (opening): Ngozi Onwumere
- Flag bearer (closing): Simidele Adeagbo
- Medals: Gold 0 Silver 0 Bronze 0 Total 0

Winter Olympics appearances (overview)
- 2018; 2022; 2026

Nigeria sent a delegation to compete at the 2018 Winter Olympics in Pyeongchang, South Korea from 9–25 February 2018. This marked the debut for the country at the Winter Olympics. The delegation consisted of three bobsledders, who finished 19th in the two-woman competition, and skeleton racer Simidele Adeagbo who came in 20th in the women's event.

== Background ==
Nigeria first participated in the Summer Olympic Games in the 1952 Helsinki Games, but this was the nation's debut appearance at a Winter Olympic Games. The chef de mission for the Nigerian contingent was Gbenga Elegbeleye and Dr David Olusoga Ogbolu. The Nigerian delegation to Pyeongchang consisted of four women: bobsledders Seun Adigun, Akuoma Omeoga, and Ngozi Onwumere, and skeleton racer Simidele Adeagbo. Onwumere was chosen as the flag bearer for the parade of nations during the opening ceremony, and Adeagbo was selected to carry the flag for the closing ceremony.

== Bobsleigh ==
Nigeria qualified a team of three athletes in the two-women bobsleigh competition through the quota for continental representation. Seun Adigun was the driver of the sled, while Akuoma Omeoga and Ngozi Onwumere served as breakwomen, only one of which could be in the sled at a time. All three were former track and field athletes, and all were born in the United States. Adigun participated in all four runs, while Omeoga participated in the first two runs, and Onwumere in the last two runs. On 20 February, the first two heats were held, and the Nigerian sled posted times of 52.21 seconds and 52.55 seconds. After the first two heats, they were roughly 3.5 seconds behind the leader. The next day, in the third and fourth runs, their times were 52.31 seconds and 52.53 seconds respectively. Their final time was 3 minutes and 29.60 seconds, which placed them 19th (after one sled from the Olympic Athletes from Russia was disqualified for doping).

Athlete	Event	Run 1		Run 2		Run 3		Run 4		Total	
Athlete	Event	Time	Rank	Time	Rank	Time	Rank	Time	Rank	Time	Rank
Seun Adigun*; Akuoma Omeoga (Run 1–2); Ngozi Onwumere (Run 3–4)	Two-woman	52.21	19	52.55	19	52.31	19	52.53	19	3:29.60	19

* – Denotes the driver of each sled

== Skeleton ==
Nigeria qualified one female skeleton athlete through the quota for continental representation. Simidele Adeagbo is a Canadian native who spent her childhood in Nigeria. She went to university in the United States at the University of Kentucky, where she was part of the track and field team. She only took up skeleton racing in September 2017. Adeagbo is the first female athlete representing an African country to compete in skeleton, and she was 36 years old at the time of the Pyeongchang Olympics. On 16 February, she posted run times of 54.19 seconds and 54.58 seconds, making her first day combined time 1 minute and 48.77 seconds. The next day, on her third run, she finished in a time of 53.73 seconds, and her fourth run was completed in 54.28 seconds. After four runs, her final time was 3 minutes and 36.78 seconds, which put her in 20th place.

Athlete	Event	Run 1		Run 2		Run 3		Run 4		Total	
Athlete	Event	Time	Rank	Time	Rank	Time	Rank	Time	Rank	Time	Rank
Simidele Adeagbo	Women's	54.19	20	54.58	20	53.73	20	54.28	20	3:36.78	20

== See also ==
- Nigeria at the 2018 Summer Youth Olympics
- Nigeria at the 2018 Commonwealth Games
