= Angelica di Silvestri =

Olympic cross-skier from Dominica

Personal information
- Born: Angelica Morrone; 25 November 1965 (age 60) Cosenza, Italy
- Spouse: Gary di Silvestri

Sport
- Country: Dominica
- Sport: Cross-country skiing

Angelica Morrone di Silvestri (born 25 November 1965) is a cross-country skier who competed for Dominica at the 2014 Winter Olympics in the cross-country skiing race.

She and her husband Gary di Silvestri earned points by competing in qualifying races in lower level tournaments in New Zealand and North America. She finished at or near the bottom in many qualifying races, but earned enough points to qualify for the Olympics. She was injured in a training run and did not compete in the 10K women's classic on 13 February. Olympic historian Bill Mallon described Di Silvestri and her husband as “classic Olympic tourists.”

The Di Silvestris were accused in 2014 of evading paying taxes on the sale of their Turks and Caicos mansion in 2006, but were never indicted.

== See also ==
- Dominica at the 2014 Winter Olympics
