= Klaus Jungbluth =

Ecuadorian cross-country skier (born 1979)

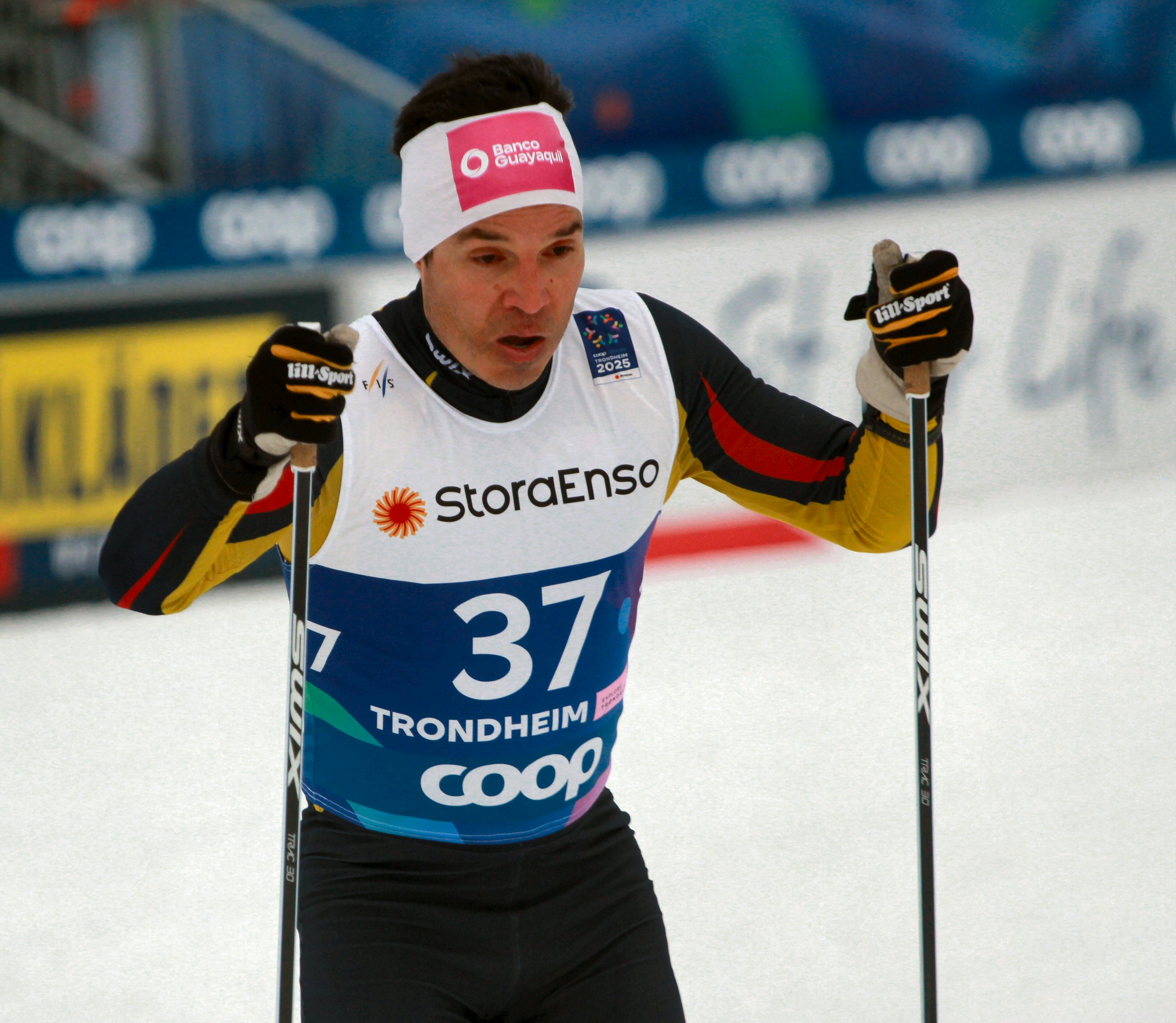
- Jungbluth in 2025

Personal information
- Full name: Klaus Jungbluth Rodríguez
- Born: 10 July 1979 (age 46) Guayaquil, Ecuador
- Height: 170 cm (5 ft 7 in)
- Weight: 62 kg (137 lb)

Klaus Jungbluth Rodríguez (born 10 July 1979 in Guayaquil) is an Ecuadorian cross-country skier.

== Skiing career ==
In 2016 Jungbluth sought and received the help of the Ecuadorian National Olympic Committee to create a ski federation for Ecuador, which allowed him to compete for the country. Jungbluth was living and training in Mountain Creek, Queensland, Australia. Jungbluth became the first athlete from Ecuador to compete at the Winter Olympics. On 19 January 2018 Jungbluth was named as the country's flag bearer during the opening ceremony.

He was awarded the prize Espìritu Olìmpico 2018 by the Ecuadorian National Olympic Committee.

== Personal life ==
Jungbluth is of German descent through his great-grandfather. He completed a PhD in exercise physiology at the University of Queensland in Australia in 2023. He previously completed a bachelor's degree in physiotherapy (2009) at Charles University of Prague in the Czech Republic and a master's degree in exercise physiology (2011) at the Norwegian University of Science and Technology (NTNU) in Trondheim, Norway. He speaks six languages: Spanish, English, Italian, Czech, Norwegian and German. Jungbluth currently resides in Brig, Kanton Wallis, Switzerland with his wife Erika and youngest children, Kikkan, Elisa and Kurt, while his two older daughters Kiersten and Melina live in Guayaquil.

Jungbluth was the lone representative for Ecuador in the 2018 Winter Olympics in South Korea and the 2026 Winter Olympics in Italy.

== See also ==
- Ecuador at the 2018 Winter Olympics
- Ecuador at the 2026 Winter Olympics

Olympic Games
Preceded by Estefania García	Flag bearer for Ecuador; PyeongChang 2018	Succeeded by Alexandra Escobar; Julio Castillo
