= Sarah Escobar =

Ecuadorian-American skier (born 2002)

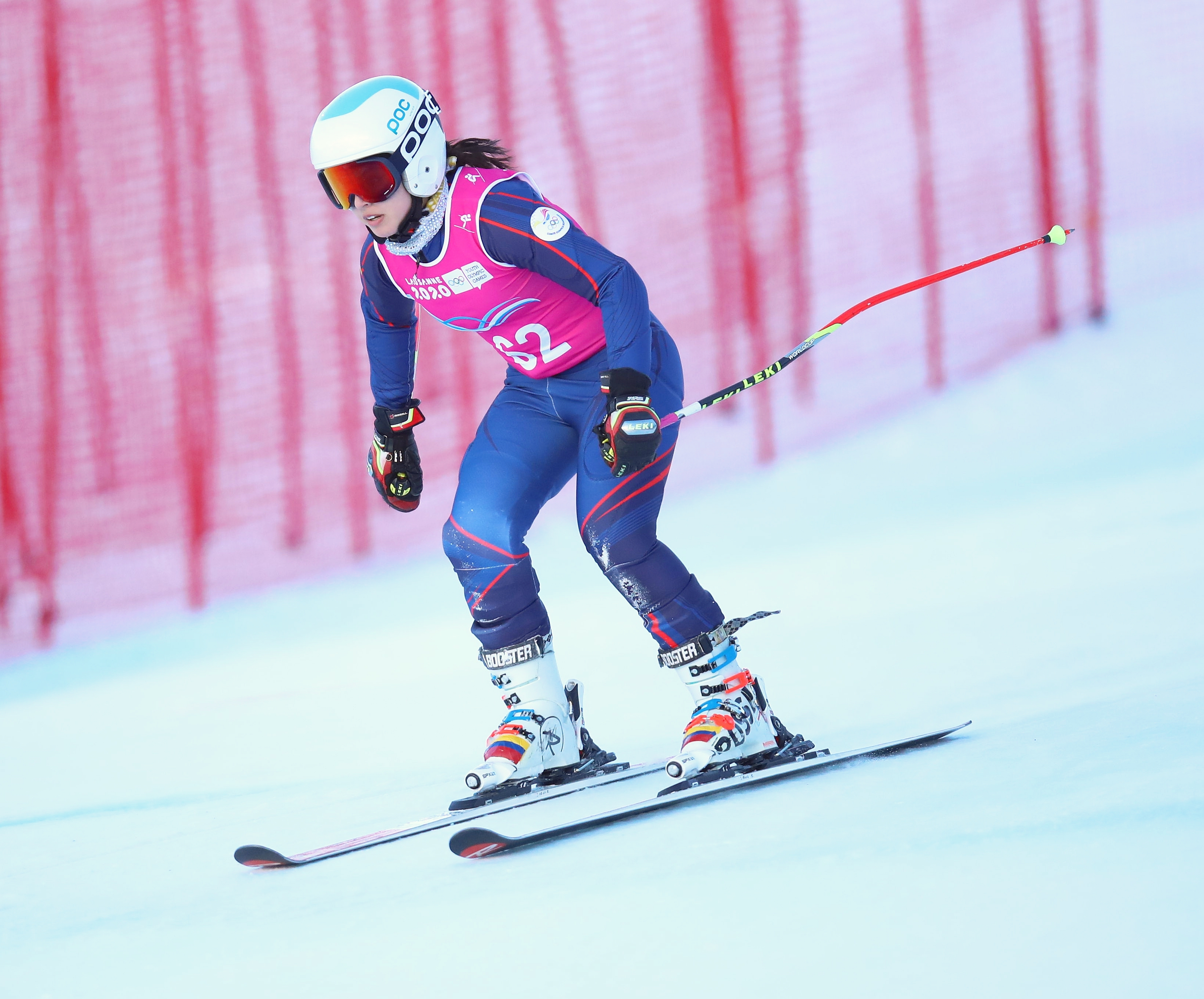
- Escobar at the 2020 Youth Olympics

Personal information
- Nationality: Ecuadorian / American
- Born: February 1, 2002 (age 24) Sparta, New Jersey, United States
- Height: 1.57 m (5 ft 2 in)
- Weight: 59 kg (130 lb)

Sport
- Sport: skiing

Sarah Escobar (born February 1, 2002) is an Ecuadorian-American skier.

== Biography ==
Sarah Escobar is the daughter of two Ecuadorians, Eleana and Fabian Escobar, who emigrated to the United States.

=== Early life and education ===
Escobar learned to ski when she was three and a half years old. She was attracted to the sport because her older brother was a skilled skier.

Raised in Sparta, New Jersey, Escobar learned to ski at Stowe Mountain Resort as a three-year-old and began competing in her home state of New Jersey at the age of nine. Shortly afterward, she started training at Waterville Valley Academy, a ski academy in Waterville Valley, New Hampshire, to improve her skills.

Escobar attends Saint Michael's College in Vermont, USA, where she studies psychology. She also belongs to the St. Michael's ski team. She expects to graduate in 2025.

=== Career ===
In 2020, Escobar became the first Ecuadorian to participate in the Winter Youth Olympics when she competed in Lausanne. She was part of the slalom, giant slalom, super-G, and combined events.

Escobar was the sole athlete representing Ecuador at the 2022 Winter Olympics in Beijing. She was also the first woman to represent Ecuador at the Winter Olympics. She competed in the giant slalom event, placing 60th in the first round. She was unable to complete the second round. Escobar said, "I am very excited and proud to represent Ecuadorian women my age and my country."

Olympic Games
Preceded by Alexandra Escobar; Julio Castillo	Flagbearer for Ecuador; Beijing 2022	Succeeded by Neisi Dájomes; Julio Mendoza Loor
