= Gary di Silvestri =

Olympic cross-skier from Dominica

Personal information
- Born: February 3, 1967 (age 59) Staten Island, New York, U.S.
- Spouse: Angelica di Silvestri

Sport
- Country: Dominica
- Sport: Cross-country skiing

Gary Charles di Silvestri (born February 3, 1967, in Staten Island, New York, United States) is a cross-country skier who competed for Dominica at the 2014 Winter Olympics in the 15 kilometre classical race.

Gary di Silvestri is a graduate of Monsignor Farrell High School in Staten Island, New York, where he was a member of the football, wrestling and track & field teams. He has an undergraduate degree from Georgetown University and a Master of Business Administration from Columbia University. In 1997, di Silvestri founded Deutsche Suisse Asset Management. The Di Silvestris were accused in 2014 of evading paying taxes on the sale of their Turks and Caicos mansion in 2006, but were never indicted.

== Olympics ==
With sights set on competing at the 2014 Olympics in Sochi, di Silvestri raced in five Olympic qualifiers leading up to the games. He and his wife Angelica di Silvestri earned points by competing in qualifying races in lower level tournaments in New Zealand and North America. Prior to the start of the games, Silvestri fell ill by contracting acute gastroenteritis, and was unable to finish the 15 km race. He was one of four competitors to not finish his 15 km event (there was also one non-starter). Olympic historian Bill Mallon described Di Silvestri and his wife as "classic Olympic tourists."

== See also ==
- Dominica at the 2014 Winter Olympics

Olympic Games
| Preceded by Erison Hurtault | Flag bearer for Dominica; Sochi 2014 | Succeeded by Yordanys Durañona |
