= Nigeria at the 2026 Winter Olympics =

- Flag of Nigeria
- IOC code: NGR
- NOC: Nigeria Olympic Committee
- Website: nigeriaolympic.org

in Milan and Cortina d'Ampezzo, Italy 6 February 2026 – 22 February 2026
- Competitors: 1 (1 man) in 1 sport
- Flag bearer (opening): Samuel Ikpefan
- Flag bearer (closing): Samuel Ikpefan
- Medals: Gold 0 Silver 0 Bronze 0 Total 0

Winter Olympics appearances (overview)
- 2018; 2022; 2026

Nigeria competed at the 2026 Winter Olympics in Milan and Cortina d'Ampezzo, Italy, from 6 to 22 February 2026.

Cross-country skier Samuel Ikpefan was the country's flagbearer during the opening ceremony. Meanwhile, Ikpefan was also the country's flagbearer during the closing ceremony.

== Competitors ==
The following is the list of number of competitors participating at the Games per sport/discipline.

Sport	Men	Women	Total
Cross-country skiing	1	0	1
Total	1	0	1

== Cross-country skiing ==
Nigeria qualified one male cross-country skier through the basic quota.

Distance

Athlete	Event	Final		
Athlete	Event	Time	Deficit	Rank
Samuel Ikpefan	Men's 10 km freestyle	26:38.4	+6:02.2	94

Sprint

Athlete	Event	Qualification		Quarterfinal		Semifinal		Final	
Athlete	Event	Time	Rank	Time	Rank	Time	Rank	Time	Rank
Samuel Ikpefan	Men's sprint	3:33.31	65	Did not advance					
