= Agnese Campeol =

Italian-Thai bobsledder (born 2006)

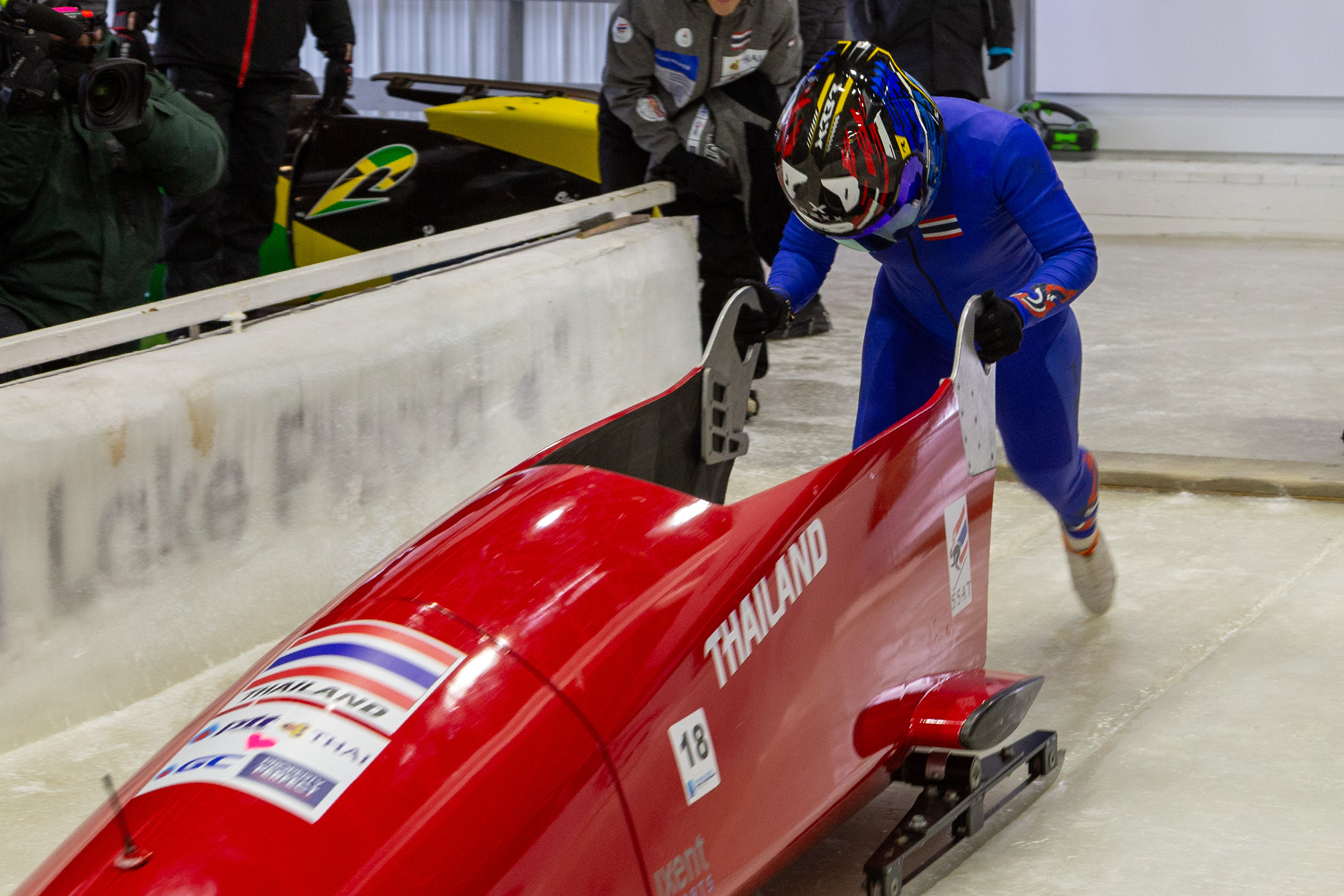
- Campeol at the 2025 IBSF World Championships

Personal information
- Nationality: Thai
- Born: 11 August 2006 (age 20) Turin, Italy

Sport
- Country: Thailand
- Sport: Bobsleigh
- Event: Monobob
Medal record
Women's bobsleigh
Representing Thailand
Winter Youth Olympic Games
Silver medal – second place	2024 Gangwon	Monobob
OMEGA Youth Series Competition
Event	1st	2nd	3rd
Monobob	0	1	4
Total	0	1	4

Agnese Campeol (Thai: อาเยเซ กัมเปอออล; born 11 August 2006) is an Italian-born Thai bobsledder who began competing for the national team in 2023 and won the silver medal in the women's monobob event at the 2024 Winter Youth Olympics, becoming the first Thai athlete to win a medal at the Winter Youth Olympics or Winter Olympics.

== Early life ==
Campeol, whose mother is from Thailand's Kumphawapi district, was born on August 11, 2006 in Turin, Italy. She moved to Thailand when she was 5 years old. She started training in the sport of bobsleigh at the age of 16 in 2022 at the Olympic Sliding Centre in Pyeongchang, South Korea. She admired American bobsledder Kaillie Humphries as a role model.

== Career results ==
All results are sourced from the International Bobsleigh and Skeleton Federation (IBSF).

=== Youth Olympic Games ===
Event	Monobob
Representing Thailand
(South Korea) 2024 Gangwon	2nd

=== OMEGA Youth Series Competition ===
Season	1	2	3	4	5	6
Representing Thailand
2022–23	DNP	DNP	2nd	4th	3rd	3rd
2023–24	4th	3rd	3rd	8th	DNP	DNP
