= Ngozi Onwumere =

American–Nigerian sprinter and bobsledder

Personal information
- Nationality: American, Nigerian
- Born: January 23, 1992 (age 34) Mesquite, Texas, U.S.

Sport
- Country: Nigeria
- Sport: Athletics
- Sprint, Bobsled: 100m 200m 400m 4x100m
- College team: University of Houston

Achievements and titles
- Personal best: 200 m: 23.34 s (2015)
Medal record
Women's Athletics
Representing Nigeria
All-Africa Games
Gold medal – first place	2015 Brazzaville	4x100m relay
Silver medal – second place	2015 Brazzaville	200 m

Ngozi Whitney Onwumere, also known as Betty Onwumere (born January 23, 1992) is an American– Nigerian sprinter and bobsledder who competes internationally for Nigeria. In track, Onwumere specializes in the 100 metres, 200 metres, 400 metres and 4 x 100 metres relay. Ngozi claimed gold alongside Blessing Okagbare, Lawretta Ozoh and Cecilia Francis in the 4 x 100 metres relay at the 2015 All-Africa Games in Brazzaville, Congo. She also represented Nigeria at the 2015 IAAF World Relays in Nassau, Bahamas. She represented Nigeria at the 2018 Winter Olympics in 2-women bobsled.

Onwumere was born and raised in Mesquite, Texas, where she graduated from Mesquite High School. She attended the University of Houston.

Olympic Games
Preceded by Olufunke Oshonaike	Flagbearer for Nigeria; PyeongChang 2018	Succeeded by Odunayo Adekuoroye; Quadri Aruna
