= Dominica at the 2014 Winter Olympics =

- IOC code: DMA
- NOC: Dominica Olympic Committee
- Website: www.doc.dm

in Sochi
- Competitors: 2 in 1 sport
- Flag bearers: Gary di Silvestri (opening and closing)
- Medals: Gold 0 Silver 0 Bronze 0 Total 0

Winter Olympics appearances (overview)
- 2014; 2018–2026

Dominica competed at the 2014 Winter Olympics in Sochi, Russia, from 7 to 23 February 2014. The country's participation in Sochi marked its debut appearance (as for 2026, the only appearance) in the Winter Olympics.

Dominica was represented by two athletes who competed in a single sport. Gary di Silvestri served as the country's flag-bearer during the opening and closing ceremonies. Dominica did not win any medals in the Games.

== Background ==
The Dominica Olympic Committee was formed in 1986 and recognized by the International Olympic Committee in 1987. The nation made its first Olympics appearance as an independent nation at the 1996 Summer Olympics. The current edition marked its debut appearance at the Winter Olympic Games.

The 2014 Winter Olympics were held in Sochi, Russia between 7 and 23 February 2014. Dominica was represented by two athletes competing in a single sport. Gary di Silvestri served as the country's flag-bearer during the opening, and closing ceremony. Dominica did not win a medal in the Games.

== Competitors ==
Dominica was represented by two athletes.

Sport	Men	Women	Total
Cross-country skiing	1	1	2
Total	1	1	2

== Cross-country skiing ==
As per the qualification criteria, athletes with a maximum of 100 distance points were allowed to compete in both the sprint and distance events. They were also allowed to compete in the distance event provided that their distance points did not exceed 300. NOCs which did not have any athlete meeting the "A" standard were allowed to enter one competitor of each sex (known as the basic quota) in the sprint event or the distance event provided that they satisfied the "B" standard of having a maximum of 300 distance points at the end of qualifying on 20 January 2014. A maximum of 20 athletes (maximum of 12 male or 12 female athletes) from a single participating NOC were allowed to compete and the remaining quotas were allocated further to athletes satisfying the "B" standard criteria from other NOCs.

The couple of Angelica di Silvestri and Gary di Silvestri qualified for the games. Both the athletes resided in the United States, and did not have any familial ties to Dominica. They had visited the country rarely and received the Dominican citizenship as a part of an investment program run by the government. Their participation raised concerns on the acquisition of Dominican citizenship and on the qualification process for the Winter Olympics.

The main event was held at the Laura Biathlon & Ski Complex. Angelica did not start her race after an injury during training. Had she competed in her race, she would have become the oldest woman to compete in a cross-country skiing race at the Winter Olympics, surpassing Norway's Hilde Gjermundshaug Pedersen, who competed as a 41-year-old at the 2006 Winter Olympics in Turin. Gary also did not finish the event due to illness.

Distance

Athlete	Event	Final		
Athlete	Event	Time	Deficit	Rank
Gary di Silvestri	Men's 15 km classical	DNF		
Angelica di Silvestri	Women's 10 km classical	DNS		
