= Seun Adigun =

Nigerian-American bobsledder and athlete

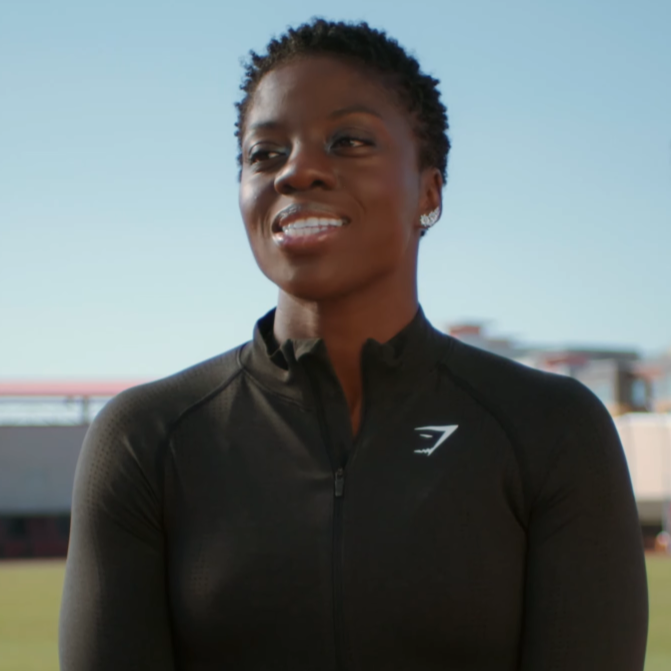
- Seun Adigun in 2022

Personal information
- National team: Nigeria
- Born: 3 January 1987 (age 39) Chicago, Illinois, United States
- Education: Texas Chiropractic College; University of Houston

Sport
- Sport: Running
- Event: Hurdles
Medal record
Women's athletics
Representing Nigeria
African Games
Gold medal – first place	2011 Maputo	100 m hurdles
African Championships
Gold medal – first place	2010 Nairobi	100 m hurdles

Moriam Seun Adigun (born 3 January 1987, Chicago) is a Nigerian–American chiropractor, bobsledder, and former runner who specialized in the 100 metres hurdles.

== Early life and education ==
Adigun was born in Chicago, USA. As a child she played many sports including flag football and tennis, and participated in basketball and track and field when she was in high school. She got a scholarship to the University of Houston and participated for their women's track and field team for all four of her undergraduate years. She ended her college sports career with a bronze medal at the NCAA Women's Outdoor Track and Field Championship. Adigun graduated from Houston with a degree in exercise science with a concentration in health professions and a minor in psychology. She went on to obtain a master's degree in physical education. She also obtained a bachelor's degree in human biology and a doctorate in chiropractic at the Texas Chiropractic College.

== Sporting career ==
Adigun is a three-time Nigeria National Champion and two-time African Games Champion. She competed at the 2012 Summer Olympics, but did not qualify from her heat. In 2016, she founded the Nigerian bobsled team. She represented Nigeria at the 2018 Winter Olympics in two-women bobsled, becoming part of the first-ever Winter Olympians from the country. Seun Adigun was the first ever African athlete who participated both in Summer and Winter Olympics. Additionally, the Nigerian bobsled team that she founded was the first African team to participate in bobsled at the Winter Olympics.

She has mentored high school students on behalf of the Nigerian Bobsled & Skeleton Federation since 2016. She became a Special Olympics Global Ambassador in 2018, and became a member of the Special Olympics Board of Directors in 2024. In 2024 she hosted a Nigerian heritage celebration with the Houston Rockets.

== International competitions ==
Year	Competition	Venue	Position	Event	Notes
Representing Nigeria
2009	World Championships	Berlin, Germany	27th (h)	100 m hurdles	13.33
2009	World Championships	Berlin, Germany	16th (h)	4 × 100 m relay	46.54
2010	World Indoor Championships	Doha, Qatar	22nd (h)	60 m hurdles	8.58
2010	African Championships	Nairobi, Kenya	1st	100 m hurdles	13.14
2010	Continental Cup	Split, Croatia	6th	100 m hurdles	13.48
2011	World Championships	Daegu, South Korea	19th (sf)	100 m hurdles	13.14
2011	All-Africa Games	Maputo, Mozambique	1st	100 m hurdles	13.20
2012	World Indoor Championships	Istanbul, Turkey	8th	60 m hurdles	8.33

== Personal life ==
Seun Adigun had a sister named Amezee, nicknamed "Mae-Mae", who died in a car accident. Two of the sleds used by the Nigeria bobsled team, Maeflower 1 and Maeflower 2, were named in her honor. Additionally, Adigun is a distant cousin of NBA player Hakeem Olajuwon.

== Awards and nominations ==
In 2018, Adigun was given the Woman of Inspiration Award by the Women In Sports & Events (WISE) group. Also in 2018, she was honored as Nigerian Sports Woman of the Year at the Nigerian Sports Awards. She appeared at the tenth annual iWrite Literacy Organization luncheon in 2019, where she was honored as one of seven women who "exemplify global leadership".
