= Bobsleigh at the 2018 Winter Olympics =

Bobsleigh at the XXIII Olympic Winter Games
- Bobsleigh pictogram at the 2018 Winter Olympics
- Venue: Alpensia Sliding Centre
- Dates: 18–25 February 2018
- No. of events: 3 (2 men, 1 women)
- Competitors: 164 from 22 nations

Bobsleigh at the 2018 Winter Olympics was held at the Alpensia Sliding Centre near Pyeongchang, South Korea. The events were scheduled to take place between 18 and 25 February 2018. A total of three bobsleigh events were held.

== Qualification ==
A maximum of 170 quota spots were available to athletes to compete at the games (130 men and 40 women). The qualification was based on the world rankings of 18 January 2018.

== Competition schedule ==
The following was the competition schedule for all events.

All times are (UTC+9).

Date	Time	Event
18 February	20:05	Two-man runs 1 and 2
19 February	20:15	Two-man runs 3 and 4
20 February	20:50	Two-woman runs 1 and 2
21 February	20:40	Two-woman runs 3 and 4
24 February	09:30	Four-man runs 1 and 2
25 February	09:30	Four-man runs 3 and 4

== Medal summary ==
=== Medal table ===
* Host nation (South Korea)

Rank	Nation	Gold	Silver	Bronze	Total
1	Germany	3	1	0	4
2	Canada	1	0	1	2
3	South Korea*	0	1	0	1
3	United States	0	1	0	1
5	Latvia	0	0	1	1
Totals (5 entries)		4	3	2	9

=== Events ===
Event	Gold		Silver		Bronze	
Two-man	Canada; Justin Kripps; Alexander Kopacz	3:16.86	Not awarded		Latvia; Oskars Melbārdis; Jānis Strenga	3:16.91
Two-man	Germany; Francesco Friedrich; Thorsten Margis	3:16.86	Not awarded		Latvia; Oskars Melbārdis; Jānis Strenga	3:16.91
Four-man	Germany; Francesco Friedrich; Candy Bauer; Martin Grothkopp; Thorsten Margis	3:15.85	Germany; Nico Walther; Kevin Kuske; Alexander Rödiger; Eric Franke	3:16.38	Not awarded	
Four-man	Germany; Francesco Friedrich; Candy Bauer; Martin Grothkopp; Thorsten Margis	3:15.85	South Korea; Won Yun-jong; Jun Jung-lin; Seo Young-woo; Kim Dong-hyun	3:16.38	Not awarded	
Two-woman	Germany; Mariama Jamanka; Lisa Buckwitz	3:22.45	United States; Elana Meyers Taylor; Lauren Gibbs	3:22.52	Canada; Kaillie Humphries; Phylicia George	3:22.89

== Participating nations ==
A total of 164 athletes from 22 nations (including the IOC's designation of Olympic Athletes from Russia) were scheduled to participate (the numbers of athletes are shown in parentheses). This was the first time that Nigeria had qualified for the Winter Games in any sport. The two-woman bobsleigh team was thus Nigeria's first ever representation at the Winter Olympics.

- Australia (4)
- Austria (12)
- Belgium (4)
- Brazil (4)
- Canada (18)
- China (6)
- Croatia (4)
- Czech Republic (8)
- France (5)
- Germany (18)
- Great Britain (10)
- Italy (4)
- Jamaica (2)
- Latvia (8)
- Monaco (2)
- Nigeria (2)
- Olympic Athletes from Russia (10)
- Poland (4)
- Romania (7)
- South Korea (6)
- Switzerland (10)
- United States (16)
