= Nigeria at the Olympics =

- IOC code: NGR
- NOC: Nigeria Olympic Committee
- Medals Ranked 80th: Gold 3 Silver 11 Bronze 13 Total 27

Summer appearances
- 1952; 1956; 1960; 1964; 1968; 1972; 1976; 1980; 1984; 1988; 1992; 1996; 2000; 2004; 2008; 2012; 2016; 2020; 2024

Winter appearances
- 2018; 2022; 2026

Nigeria first participated in the Olympic Games in 1952, and has sent athletes to compete in every Summer Olympic Games since then, except for the boycotted 1976 Summer Olympics. The nation participated in the Winter Olympic Games for the first time in 2018, having qualified female athletes in bobsleigh and skeleton.

Nigerian athletes have won a total of 27 medals, mostly in athletics and boxing. The national football team won the gold medal in 1996. In 2008, following the International Olympic Committee's decision to strip the American 4 × 400 metre relay team of their medals from the 2000 Summer Olympics after Antonio Pettigrew confessed to using performance-enhancing drugs, their Nigerian rivals were awarded the gold medal. Nigeria also won a medal in the heavyweight division of taekwondo at the 1992 Summer Olympics; as this was only a demonstration sport, Emmanuel Oghenejobo's silver did not count as an official win.

The Nigeria Olympic Committee, the National Olympic Committee for Nigeria, was created in 1951.

== Medal tables ==
=== Medals by Summer Games ===
Games	Athletes	Gold	Silver	Bronze	Total	Rank
1952 Helsinki	9	0	0	0	0	–
1956 Melbourne	10	0	0	0	0	–
1960 Rome	12	0	0	0	0	–
1964 Tokyo	18	0	0	1	1	35
1968 Mexico City	36	0	0	0	0	–
1972 Munich	25	0	0	1	1	43
1976 Montreal	boycotted					
1980 Moscow	44	0	0	0	0	–
1984 Los Angeles	32	0	1	1	2	30
1988 Seoul	69	0	0	0	0	–
1992 Barcelona	55	0	3	1	4	38
1996 Atlanta	65	2	1	3	6	32
2000 Sydney	83	1	2	0	3	41
2004 Athens	70	0	0	2	2	68
2008 Beijing	74	0	3	2	5	57
2012 London	49	0	0	0	0	–
2016 Rio de Janeiro	71	0	0	1	1	78
2020 Tokyo	55	0	1	1	2	74
2024 Paris	88	0	0	0	0	–
2028 Los Angeles	future event					
2032 Brisbane	future event					
Total		3	11	13	27	80

=== Medals by Winter Games ===
Games	Athletes	Gold	Silver	Bronze	Total	Rank
2018 Pyeongchang	3	0	0	0	0	–
2022 Beijing	1	0	0	0	0	–
2026 Milano Cortina	1	0	0	0	0	–
2030 French Alps	future event					
2034 Utah	future event					
Total		0	0	0	0	–

=== Medals by summer sport ===
Sport	Gold	Silver	Bronze	Total
Athletics	2	5	7	14
Football	1	1	1	3
Boxing	0	3	3	6
Weightlifting	0	1	1	2
Wrestling	0	1	0	1
Taekwondo	0	0	1	1
Totals (6 entries)	3	11	13	27

== List of medalists ==
Medal	Name	Games	Sport	Event
Bronze	Nojim Maiyegun	1964 Tokyo	Boxing	Men's light middleweight
Bronze	Isaac Ikhouria	1972 Munich	Boxing	Men's light heavyweight
Silver	Peter Konyegwachie	1984 Los Angeles	Boxing	Men's featherweight
Bronze	Sunday Uti; Moses Ugbisie; Rotimi Peters; Innocent Egbunike	1984 Los Angeles	Athletics	Men's 4×400 metre relay
Silver	Olapade Adeniken; Davidson Ezinwa; Chidi Imoh; Oluyemi Kayode; Osmond Ezinwa*	1992 Barcelona	Athletics	Men's 4×100 metre relay
Silver	David Izonritei	1992 Barcelona	Boxing	Men's heavyweight
Silver	Richard Igbineghu	1992 Barcelona	Boxing	Men's super heavyweight
Bronze	Beatrice Utondu; Christy Opara-Thompson; Mary Onyali; Faith Idehen	1992 Barcelona	Athletics	Women's 4×100 metre relay
Gold	Chioma Ajunwa	1996 Atlanta	Athletics	Women's long jump
Gold	Men's football team Daniel Amokachi; Emmanuel Amuneke; Tijani Babangida; Celestine Babayaro; Emmanuel Babayaro; Teslim Fatusi; Victor Ikpeba; Dosu Joseph; Nwankwo Kanu; Garba Lawal; Abiodun Obafemi; Kingsley Obiekwu; Uche Okechukwu; Jay-Jay Okocha; Sunday Oliseh; Mobi Oparaku; Wilson Oruma; Taribo West	1996 Atlanta	Football	Men's competition
Silver	Olabisi Afolabi; Fatima Yusuf; Charity Opara; Falilat Ogunkoya	1996 Atlanta	Athletics	Women's 4×400 metre relay
Bronze	Mary Onyali	1996 Atlanta	Athletics	Women's 200 metres
Bronze	Falilat Ogunkoya	1996 Atlanta	Athletics	Women's 400 metres
Bronze	Duncan Dokiwari	1996 Atlanta	Boxing	Men's super heavyweight
Gold	Nduka Awazie; Fidelis Gadzama; Clement Chukwu; Jude Monye; Sunday Bada; Enefiok Udo-Obong	2000 Sydney	Athletics	Men's 4×400 metre relay
Silver	Glory Alozie	2000 Sydney	Athletics	Women's 100 metre hurdles
Silver	Ruth Ogbeifo	2000 Sydney	Weightlifting	Women's 75 kg
Bronze	Olusoji Fasuba; Uchenna Emedolu; Aaron Egbele; Deji Aliu	2004 Athens	Athletics	Men's 4×100 metre relay
Bronze	James Godday; Musa Audu; Saul Weigopwa; Enefiok Udo-Obong	2004 Athens	Athletics	Men's 4×400 metre relay
Silver	Men's football team Olubayo Adefemi; Dele Adeleye; Oluwafemi Ajilore; Efe Ambrose; Victor Anichebe; Onyekachi Apam; Emmanuel Ekpo; Ikechukwu Ezenwa; Promise Isaac; Monday James; Sani Kaita; Chinedu Obasi; Victor Nsofor Obinna; Peter Odemwingie; Chibuzor Okonkwo; Solomon Okoronkwo; Oladapo Olufemi; Ambruse Vanzekin	2008 Beijing	Football	Men's competition
Silver	Franca Idoko; Gloria Kemasuode; Halimat Ismaila; Oludamola Osayomi; Agnes Osazuwa*	2008 Beijing	Athletics	Women's 4x100 metre relay
Silver	Blessing Okagbare	2008 Beijing	Athletics	Women's long jump
Bronze	Chika Chukwumerije	2008 Beijing	Taekwondo	Men's +80 kg
Bronze	Mariam Usman	2008 Beijing	Weightlifting	Women's +75 kg
Bronze	Men's football team Shehu Abdullahi; Junior Ajayi; Daniel Akpeyi; Stanley Amuzie; Emmanuel Daniel; William Troost-Ekong; Saturday Erimuya; Oghenekaro Etebo; Imoh Ezekiel; Kingsley Madu; Mikel John Obi; Muenfuh Sincere; Azubuike Okechukwu; Popoola Saliu; Umar Sadiq; Ndifreke Udo; Aminu Umar; Usman Mohammed	2016 Rio de Janeiro	Football	Men's competition
Silver	Blessing Oborududu	2020 Tokyo	Wrestling	Women's freestyle 68 kg
Bronze	Ese Brume	2020 Tokyo	Athletics	Women's long jump

== See also ==
- List of flag bearers for Nigeria at the Olympics
- Category:Olympic competitors for Nigeria
- Nigeria at the Paralympics
