= List of flag bearers for Kenya at the Olympics =

Kenya at the Olympics
- IOC code: KEN
- NOC: National Olympic Committee of Kenya
- Website: teamkenya.or.ke
- Medals: Gold 39 Silver 44 Bronze 41 Total 124

Summer appearances
- 1956; 1960; 1964; 1968; 1972; 1976–1980; 1984; 1988; 1992; 1996; 2000; 2004; 2008; 2012; 2016; 2020; 2024

Winter appearances
- 1998; 2002; 2006; 2010–2014; 2018; 2022; 2026

This is a list of flag bearers who have represented Kenya at the Olympics.

Flag bearers carry the national flag of their country at the opening ceremony of the Olympic Games.

#	Event year	Season	Flag bearer	Sport
1	1964	Summer	Kip Keino (Note: Seraphino Antao was originally scheduled to be the flag bearer. He became ill two days before the opening ceremony and chose to have Keino carry the flag instead.)	Athletics
2	1972	Summer	Kip Keino	Athletics
3	1984	Summer	James Omondi	Boxing
4	1988	Summer	Patrick Waweru	Boxing
5	1992	Summer	Patrick Sang	Athletics
6	1996	Summer	Paul Tergat	Athletics
7	1998	Winter	Philip Boit	Cross-country skiing
8	2000	Summer	Kennedy Ochieng	Athletics
9	2002	Winter	Philip Boit	Cross-country skiing
10	2004	Summer	Violet Barasa	Volleyball
11	2006	Winter	Philip Boit	Cross-country skiing
12	2008	Summer	Grace Kwamboka Momanyi	Athletics (Note: Did not compete.)
13	2012	Summer	Jason Dunford	Swimming
14	2016	Summer	Shehzana Anwar	Archery
15	2018	Winter	Sabrina Simader	Alpine skiing
16	2020	Summer	Andrew Amonde	Rugby sevens
16	2020	Summer	Mercy Moim	Volleyball
17	2024	Summer	Triza Atuka	Volleyball
17	2024	Summer	Ferdinand Omanyala	Athletics

== See also ==
- Kenya at the Olympics
