= Kenya at the 2006 Winter Olympics =

- The flag of Kenya
- IOC code: KEN
- NOC: National Olympic Committee of Kenya
- Website: teamkenya.or.ke

in Turin
- Competitors: 1 (1 man) in 1 sport
- Flag bearers: Philip Boit (opening and closing)
- Medals: Gold 0 Silver 0 Bronze 0 Total 0

Winter Olympics appearances (overview)
- 1998; 2002; 2006; 2010–2014; 2018; 2022; 2026

Kenya sent a delegation to compete at the 2006 Winter Olympics in Turin, Italy, from 10–26 February 2006. This was Kenya's third time participating in a Winter Olympic Games. The Kenyan delegation consisted of one athlete, cross-country skier and three-time Olympian Philip Boit. In his only event, he finished 91st in the men's 15 kilometre classical.

== Background ==
The National Olympic Committee of Kenya was recognised by the International Olympic Committee on 1 January 1955. They have competed at most Summer Olympic Games since then and through 2016 have won exactly 100 medals at Summer Olympiads. Their first Winter Olympics participation, however, only came in the 1998 Winter Olympics, and Kenya was making its third Winter Olympic appearance in Turin. Kenya has never won a Winter Olympics medal. The Kenyan delegation was the first to check in at the Turin Olympics. The 2006 Winter Olympics were held from 10–26 February; a total of 2,508 athletes representing 80 National Olympic Committees took part. The delegation consisted of a single athlete, cross-country skier Philip Boit. He was the flag bearer for both the opening ceremony and the closing ceremony. Boit was Kenya's only Winter Olympian until Sabrina Simader competed at the 2018 Winter Olympics, a games at which he served as chef de mission.

== Cross-country skiing ==
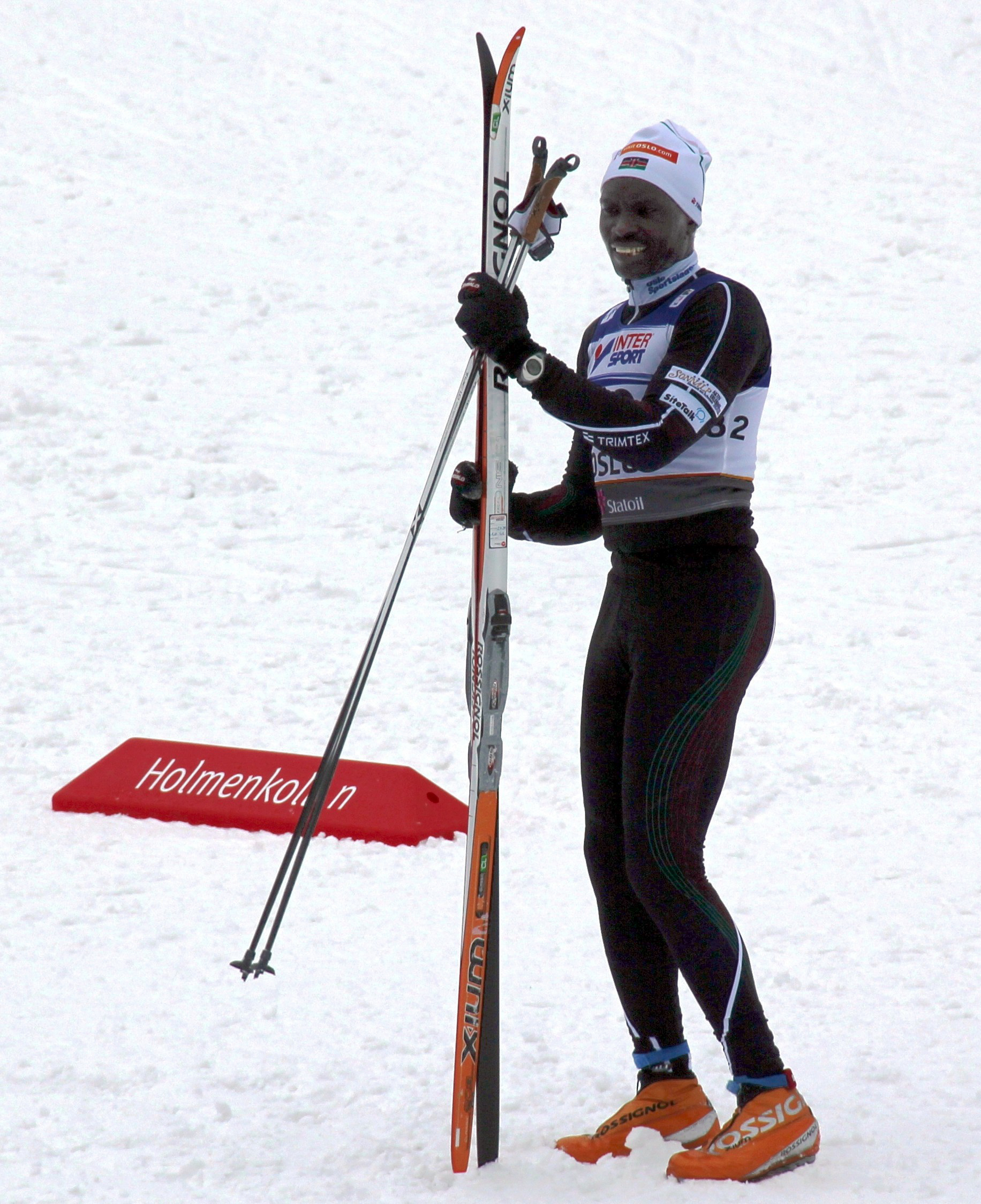
Philip Boit at the 2011 World Championships

Philip Boit, who had gained international recognition after placing last in the 1998 Winter Olympics, competed in his third Olympics as Kenya's sole representative. Boit was a runner in his native Kenya, who had been scouted by American sportswear company Nike, who wished to train runners as cross-country skiers. In 1998, Boit finished the 10 kilometer classical race in a time of 47 minutes and 25.5 seconds, 20 minutes behind Bjørn Dæhlie, the gold medalist; delaying the medal ceremony, Dæhlie remained at the finish line to congratulate Boit. Boit saw snow only two years before his Olympic debut in 1998, and later named his first child after Dæhlie. He was 26 years old at the time of the Turin Olympics. On 17 February, Boit finished the 15 kilometre classical in a time of 53 minutes and 32.4 seconds, which put him in 91st place out of 96 classified finishers. The gold medal was won by Andrus Veerpalu of Estonia in 38 minutes and 1.3 seconds, the silver by Lukáš Bauer of the Czech Republic and bronze was taken by Tobias Angerer of Germany. When Kenya next qualified for a Winter Olympics, in 2018, Boit was one of the coaches and said of the athlete Sabrina Simader, "Being the pioneer of skiing in Kenya, I am glad that my legacy continues as Simader heads to South Korea."

Distance

Athlete	Event	Final	
Athlete	Event	Total	Rank
Philip Boit	Men's 15 km classical	53:32.4	91

== See also ==
- Kenya at the 2006 Commonwealth Games
