= Issa Laborde Dit Pere =

Kenyan alpine skier (born 2007)

Issa Laborde
Personal information
- Full name: Issa Gachingiri Laborde Dit Pere
- National team: Kenya
- Born: 12 March 2007 (age 19) Échirolles, France

Skiing career
- Sport: Alpine skiing
- Disciplines: Giant slalom, slalom, super-G

Olympics
- Teams: 1 – (2026)
- Medals: 0

Issa Gachingiri Laborde Dit Pere (born 12 March 2007) is a Kenyan alpine skier.

== Career ==
Born to a Kenyan mother and a French father and raised in the ski resort of L'Alpe d'Huez, he began skiing at a very young age.

He competed in the 2024 Winter Youth Olympics, becoming the first Kenyan male alpine skier to compete internationally.

He qualified to represent Kenya in the giant slalom event at the 2026 Winter Olympics, and was the country's flag bearer.

== Olympic results ==
Year
Year	Age	Slalom	Giant slalom	Super-G	Downhill	Team combined
2026	18	—	66	—	—	—
