= Kenya at the 1998 Winter Olympics =

- IOC code: KEN
- NOC: National Olympic Committee of Kenya
- Website: teamkenya.or.ke

in Nagano
- Competitors: 1 in 1 sport
- Flag bearer: Philip Boit
- Medals: Gold 0 Silver 0 Bronze 0 Total 0

Winter Olympics appearances (overview)
- 1998; 2002; 2006; 2010–2014; 2018; 2022; 2026

Kenya competed in the 1998 Winter Olympics in Nagano, Japan. The country's participation at the Games marked its Winter Olympics debut, although it had competed in the Summer Olympics since 1956. The delegation consisted of a single cross-country skier, Philip Boit. He had been trained as part of a scheme created by American sportswear company Nike, Inc. Although Boit did not win a medal, his efforts received worldwide attention after gold medallist Bjørn Dæhlie of Norway waited for him at the finish line as Boit completed the race in difficult conditions in last place.

== Background ==
Kenya first competed in the Summer Olympics at the 1956 Games in Melbourne, Australia. They participated at the Summer Olympics on nine occasions prior to the 1998 Winter Olympics, where they made their Winter Olympics debut in Nagano, Japan. They sent a single cross-country skier, Philip Boit.

Both Boit and Henry Bitok were runners who had been scouted by American sportswear company Nike, Inc., who wished to train a runners as cross-country skiers. After being recruited, Boit, who had never previously seen snow, initially trained in Kenya on roller skis.

They then travelled to Finland to practice on snow. Boit later explained, "It was a bit challenging at first because I had never experienced cold weather like that in my life, even putting on skis was so difficult! But after some time, I learned to adapt." The response to Nike's project was mixed, with some comparing the story to the story of the Jamaican bobsleigh team at the 1988 Winter Games, while others such as Bob Wojnowski of The Detroit News said "These are marketing pawns financed by well-heeled publicity seekers."

The sponsorship of Boit and Bitok consisted of $200,000, to cover their training, accommodation and equipment while in Finland. The logic had been that since Nike sent Finnish runners were sent to Kenya to train, then the same could be done in reverse. Following their training, both athletes tried to qualify for the Winter Olympics, but failed to do so. Instead, Kenya opted to use a single automatic qualification spot to send Boit to the Games in 1998. Shortly prior to the Games, Boit missed two weeks of training when he was hospitalised with a stomach problem.

== Competitors ==
The following is the list of number of competitors in the Games.

Sport	Men	Women	Total
Cross-country skiing	1	0	1
Total	1	0	1

== Cross-country skiing ==
The sole Kenyan athlete at the Games, Philip Boit, competed in the men's 10 kilometre classical cross-country skiing. The competition took place on 12 February, at the Snow Harp venue in Hakuba, Nagano. The beginning of the race was chaotic, with the skiers beset by heavy rain. Boit was not prepared to race on wet snow, and later attributed it as the reason for falling down on several occasions. He found that it added further complications, adding "Going uphill, the skis were collecting snow. It was like I had put on high heeled-shoes!"

The favourite for the race, Bjørn Dæhlie of Norway won the gold medal, but instead of going to the podium to collect it, he was informed that Boit was still racing – the only competitor left on the course, down in 92nd place. Dæhlie waited for Boit to finish, welcoming him as he passed the finish line. Boit was amazed by the crowd's reaction as he arrived, "They were shouting 'Kenya GO!, Philip GO!' It was like I was winning a medal even though I was last." As he crossed the line some 20 minutes after Dæhlie, the Norwegian hugged the Kenyan – while Boit later said that he immediately thanked Dæhlie, the gold medallist insisted that Boit instead remarked that he would beat him at the next Olympics. The incident received worldwide attention.

Boit's time was 47 minutes and 25.25 seconds. After the race, he explained to the international media, "My goal, my aim, is to become a world or Olympic champion. I'm dreaming about becoming the first African to do it. I will do it." Dæhlie meanwhile said of Boit, "He deserves to be encouraged. It was hard for him but he never gave up." Boit became a celebrity in Kenya following his return, and would continue as a professional skier until 2011, taking part in two further Winter Olympics, and continuing to be friends with Dæhlie. Shortly after the 1998 Games, Boit's first child was born, the Kenyan naming him Daehlie Boit.

Key

- C = Classical style

Skiing events

Event	Athlete	Race	
Event	Athlete	Time	Rank
Men's 10 km C	Philip Boit	47:25.25	92
