= Kenya at the 2002 Winter Olympics =

- IOC code: KEN
- NOC: National Olympic Committee of Kenya
- Website: teamkenya.or.ke

in Salt Lake City
- Competitors: 1 in 1 sport
- Flag bearer: Philip Boit
- Medals: Gold 0 Silver 0 Bronze 0 Total 0

Winter Olympics appearances (overview)
- 1998; 2002; 2006; 2010–2014; 2018; 2022; 2026

Kenya sent a delegation to compete at the 2002 Winter Olympics in Salt Lake City, United States from 8–24 February 2002. The delegation consisted of one cross-country skier, Philip Boit, who was appearing in his second Olympics, and was, at the time, Kenya's only Winter Olympian in history. His best performance was 65th place in the men's sprint.

== Background ==
The National Olympic Committee of Kenya was recognised by the International Olympic Committee on 1 January 1955. They have competed at most Summer Olympic Games since and have won a significant number of medals at Summer Olympiads. However, their first Winter Olympics participation only came in the 1998 Winter Olympics, and Kenya was making its second Winter Olympic appearance in Salt Lake City. The Kenyan delegation to Utah consisted of one cross-country skier, Philip Boit. He had also been the nation's only representative four years prior. As his country's only participant, Boit was selected as the flag bearer for the opening ceremony.

== Cross-country skiing ==
Philip Boit was 30 years old at the time of the Salt Lake City Olympics. Boit was a runner who had been scouted by American sportswear company Nike, who wished to train runners as cross-country skiers. After being recruited, Boit, who had never previously seen snow, initially trained in Kenya on roller skis. He then participated in the 1998 Winter Olympics in Nagano, Japan. In the men's 2 × 10 kilometre pursuit held on 14 February, he finished the 10 kilometre classical portion in 36 minutes and 21.6 seconds. This ranked him 77th for the event, and only the top 60 were allowed to proceed to the second 10 kilometre freestyle portion. On 19 February, Boit participated in the sprint, finishing the qualifying round in a time of 3 minutes and 51.49 seconds and in 65th place. Only the top 16 finishers advanced to the quarterfinals, meaning Boit was eliminated. Boit would once again be the only Kenyan athlete at the 2006 Winter Olympics.

Sprint

Athlete	Event	Qualifying round		Quarter finals		Semi finals		Finals	
Athlete	Event	Time	Rank	Time	Rank	Time	Rank	Time	Final rank
Philip Boit	Men's sprint	3:54.49	65	did not advance					

Pursuit

Athlete	Event	10 km C		10 km F pursuit^{1}	
Athlete	Event	Time	Rank	Time	Final rank
Philip Boit	Men's 2 × 10 kilometre pursuit	36:21.6	77	did not advance	

^{1} Starting delay based on 10 km C. results.
C = Classical style, F = Freestyle
