= Kenya at the Olympics =

- IOC code: KEN
- NOC: National Olympic Committee of Kenya
- Website: teamkenya.or.ke
- Medals Ranked 33rd: Gold 39 Silver 45 Bronze 40 Total 124

Summer appearances
- 1956; 1960; 1964; 1968; 1972; 1976–1980; 1984; 1988; 1992; 1996; 2000; 2004; 2008; 2012; 2016; 2020; 2024; 2028

Winter appearances
- 1998; 2002; 2006; 2010–2014; 2018; 2022; 2026

Kenya made its debut at the 1956 Summer Olympics in Melbourne and has since become one of the most prominent nations among the Olympic athletics. The nation has participated in every Summer Olympic Games since then, with the exception of the 1976 Montreal and 1980 Moscow Games, which it boycotted along with several other African nations due to political reasons. Twenty-nine countries boycotted the 1976 Games due to the refusal of the IOC to ban New Zealand, after the New Zealand national rugby union team had toured South Africa earlier in 1976. On the occasion of the 1980 Boycotts initiated by the United States, Boxer Muhammad Ali traveled to Tanzania, Nigeria, and Senegal to unsuccessfully convince their leaders to join the boycott. He did, however, successfully convince the Kenyan government to do so.

Kenya's Olympic achievements are overwhelmingly concentrated in track and field events, particularly in middle- and long-distance running, where it has established itself as a global powerhouse. Kenyan runners have consistently dominated events ranging from the 800 metres to the marathon. The country has also won several medals in boxing, particularly in the 1960s through the 1980s, although recent decades have seen a decline in that sport's contribution to Kenya's medal tally.

One of the few African and tropical countries, Kenya participated also in 5 Winter Olympic Games. Kenyan athletes have won 124 medals in total, all from boxing and track and field events, making them the most successful African committee at the Olympics.

Another notable development has been the rise of Kenyan women in Olympic competition. While the first Kenyan woman, Pauline Konga, to win an Olympic medal did so in 1996 at the Women's 5000 metres, by 2016, Kenyan women earned seven of the nation's 13 medals, highlighting a rapid and encouraging rise in female participation and success at the highest levels of sport.

Increasingly, Kenya-born athletes are immigrating to compete in the Olympics for other countries, most notably Bahrain. In the 2016 Olympics, there were ~20 such athletes, including multiple medal winners.

The National Olympic Committee representing Kenya is the National Olympic Committee of Kenya, founded in 1955.

== Medal tables ==
=== Medals by Summer Games ===
Games	Athletes	Gold	Silver	Bronze	Total	Rank
(Australia) 1956 Melbourne	25	0	0	0	0	–
(Italy) 1960 Rome	27	0	0	0	0	–
(Japan) 1964 Tokyo	37	0	0	1	1	35
1968 Mexico City	39	3	4	2	9	14
(West Germany) 1972 Munich	57	2	3	4	9	19
(Canada) 1976 Montreal	boycotted					
(Soviet Union) 1980 Moscow	boycotted					
(United States) 1984 Los Angeles	61	1	0	2	3	23
(South Korea) 1988 Seoul	74	5	2	2	9	13
(Spain) 1992 Barcelona	51	2	4	2	8	21
(United States) 1996 Atlanta	52	1	4	3	8	38
(Australia) 2000 Sydney	56	2	3	2	7	29
(Greece) 2004 Athens	46	1	4	2	7	41
(China) 2008 Beijing	48	6	4	6	16	13
(United Kingdom) 2012 London	47	2	5	6	13	28
(Brazil) 2016 Rio de Janeiro	89	6	6	1	13	15
(Japan) 2020 Tokyo	85	4	4	2	10	19
(France) 2024 Paris	72	4	2	5	11	17
(United States) 2028 Los Angeles	future event					
(Australia) 2032 Brisbane	future event					
Total (16/30)	866	39	45	40	124	33

=== Medals by Winter Games ===
Games	Athletes	Gold	Silver	Bronze	Total	Rank
(Japan) 1998 Nagano	1	0	0	0	0	–
(United States) 2002 Salt Lake City	1	0	0	0	0	–
(Italy) 2006 Turin	1	0	0	0	0	–
(Canada) 2010 Vancouver	did not participate					
(Russia) 2014 Sochi	did not participate					
(South Korea) 2018 Pyeongchang	1	0	0	0	0	–
(China) 2022 Beijing	did not participate					
(Italy) 2026 Milano Cortina	1	0	0	0	0	–
(France) 2030 French Alps	future event					
(United States) 2034 Utah	future event					
Total (5/25)	5	0	0	0	0	–

=== Medals by summer sport ===
Sport	Gold	Silver	Bronze	Total
Athletics	38	44	35	117
Boxing	1	1	5	7
Totals (2 entries)	39	45	40	124

== List of medalists ==
Medal	Name(s)	Games	Sport	Event
Bronze	Wilson Kiprugut	1964 Tokyo	Athletics	Men's 800 m
Gold	Naftali Temu	1968 Mexico City	Athletics	Men's 10000 m
Gold	Kipchoge Keino	1968 Mexico City	Athletics	Men's 1500 m
Gold	Amos Biwott	1968 Mexico City	Athletics	Men's 3000 m steeplechase
Silver	Benjamin Kogo	1968 Mexico City	Athletics	Men's 3000 m steeplechase
Silver	Daniel Rudisha, Munyoro Nyamau, Naftali Bon, Charles Asati	1968 Mexico City	Athletics	Men's 4 × 400 m relay
Silver	Kipchoge Keino	1968 Mexico City	Athletics	Men's 5000 m
Bronze	Naftali Temu	1968 Mexico City	Athletics	Men's 5000 m
Silver	Wilson Kiprugut	1968 Mexico City	Athletics	Men's 800 m
Bronze	Philip Waruinge	1968 Mexico City	Boxing	Men's featherweight
Gold	Kipchoge Keino	1972 Munich	Athletics	Men's 3000 m steeplechase
Gold	Charles Asati, Munyoro Nyamau, Robert Ouko, Julius Sang	1972 Munich	Athletics	Men's 4 × 400 m relay
Silver	Kipchoge Keino	1972 Munich	Athletics	Men's 1500 m
Silver	Ben Jipcho	1972 Munich	Athletics	Men's 3000 m steeplechase
Silver	Philip Waruinge	1972 Munich	Boxing	Men's featherweight
Bronze	Julius Sang	1972 Munich	Athletics	Men's 400 m
Bronze	Mike Boit	1972 Munich	Athletics	Men's 800 m
Bronze	Samuel Mbugua	1972 Munich	Boxing	Men's lightweight
Bronze	Dick Murunga	1972 Munich	Boxing	Men's welterweight
Gold	Julius Korir	1984 Los Angeles	Athletics	Men's 3000 m steeplechase
Bronze	Michael Musyoki	1984 Los Angeles	Athletics	Men's 10000 m
Bronze	Ibrahim Bilali	1984 Los Angeles	Boxing	Men's flyweight
Gold	Julius Kariuki	1988 Seoul	Athletics	Men's 3000 m steeplechase
Gold	John Ngugi	1988 Seoul	Athletics	Men's 5000 m
Gold	Paul Ereng	1988 Seoul	Athletics	Men's 800 m
Gold	Peter Rono	1988 Seoul	Athletics	Men's 1500 m
Gold	Robert Wangila	1988 Seoul	Boxing	Men's welterweight
Silver	Peter Koech	1988 Seoul	Athletics	Men's 3000 m steeplechase
Silver	Douglas Wakiihuri	1988 Seoul	Athletics	Men's Marathon
Bronze	Kipkemboi Kimeli	1988 Seoul	Athletics	Men's 10000 m
Bronze	Chris Sande	1988 Seoul	Boxing	Men's middleweight
Gold	Matthew Birir	1992 Barcelona	Athletics	Men's 3000 m steeplechase
Gold	William Tanui	1992 Barcelona	Athletics	Men's 800 m
Silver	Richard Chelimo	1992 Barcelona	Athletics	Men's 10000 m
Silver	Patrick Sang	1992 Barcelona	Athletics	Men's 3000 m steeplechase
Silver	Paul Bitok	1992 Barcelona	Athletics	Men's 5000 m
Silver	Nixon Kiprotich	1992 Barcelona	Athletics	Men's 800 m
Bronze	William Mutwol	1992 Barcelona	Athletics	Men's 3000 m steeplechase
Bronze	Samson Kitur	1992 Barcelona	Athletics	Men's 400 m
Gold	Joseph Keter	1996 Atlanta	Athletics	Men's 3000 m steeplechase
Silver	Paul Tergat	1996 Atlanta	Athletics	Men's 10000 m
Silver	Moses Kiptanui	1996 Atlanta	Athletics	Men's 3000 m steeplechase
Silver	Paul Bitok	1996 Atlanta	Athletics	Men's 5000 m
Silver	Pauline Konga	1996 Atlanta	Athletics	Women's 5000 m
Bronze	Stephen Kipkorir	1996 Atlanta	Athletics	Men's 1500 m
Bronze	Fred Onyancha	1996 Atlanta	Athletics	Men's 800 m
Bronze	Erick Wainaina	1996 Atlanta	Athletics	Men's Marathon
Gold	Noah Ngeny	2000 Sydney	Athletics	Men's 1500 m
Gold	Reuben Kosgei	2000 Sydney	Athletics	Men's 3000 m steeplechase
Silver	Paul Tergat	2000 Sydney	Athletics	Men's 10000 m
Silver	Wilson Boit Kipketer	2000 Sydney	Athletics	Men's 3000 m steeplechase
Silver	Erick Wainaina	2000 Sydney	Athletics	Men's Marathon
Bronze	Bernard Lagat	2000 Sydney	Athletics	Men's 1500 m
Bronze	Joyce Chepchumba	2000 Sydney	Athletics	Women's Marathon
Gold	Ezekiel Kemboi	2004 Athens	Athletics	Men's 3000 m steeplechase
Silver	Bernard Lagat	2004 Athens	Athletics	Men's 1500 m
Silver	Brimin Kipruto	2004 Athens	Athletics	Men's 3000 m steeplechase
Silver	Isabella Ochichi	2004 Athens	Athletics	Women's 5000 m
Silver	Catherine Ndereba	2004 Athens	Athletics	Women's Marathon
Bronze	Paul Kipsiele Koech	2004 Athens	Athletics	Men's 3000 m steeplechase
Bronze	Eliud Kipchoge	2004 Athens	Athletics	Men's 5000 m
Gold	Asbel Kipruto Kiprop	2008 Beijing	Athletics	Men's 1500 m
Gold	Brimin Kiprop Kipruto	2008 Beijing	Athletics	Men's 3000 m steeplechase
Gold	Wilfred Bungei	2008 Beijing	Athletics	Men's 800 m
Gold	Samuel Wanjiru	2008 Beijing	Athletics	Men's Marathon
Gold	Pamela Jelimo	2008 Beijing	Athletics	Women's 800 m
Gold	Nancy Lagat	2008 Beijing	Athletics	Women's 1500 m
Silver	Janeth Jepkosgei Busienei	2008 Beijing	Athletics	Women's 800 m
Silver	Catherine Ndereba	2008 Beijing	Athletics	Women's Marathon
Silver	Eunice Jepkorir	2008 Beijing	Athletics	Women's 3000 m steeplechase
Silver	Eliud Kipchoge	2008 Beijing	Athletics	Men's 5000 m
Bronze	Richard Kipkemboi Mateelong	2008 Beijing	Athletics	Men's 3000 m steeplechase
Bronze	Micah Kogo	2008 Beijing	Athletics	Men's 10000 m
Bronze	Edwin Cheruiyot Soi	2008 Beijing	Athletics	Men's 5000 m
Bronze	Alfred Kirwa Yego	2008 Beijing	Athletics	Men's 800 m
Bronze	Sylvia Kibet	2008 Beijing	Athletics	Women's 5000 metres
Bronze	Linet Masai	2008 Beijing	Athletics	Women's 10000 metres
Gold	Ezekiel Kemboi	2012 London	Athletics	Men's 3000 m steeplechase
Gold	David Rudisha	2012 London	Athletics	Men's 800 m
Silver	Pamela Jelimo	2012 London	Athletics	Women's 800 m
Silver	Sally Kipyego	2012 London	Athletics	Women's 10000 m
Silver	Priscah Jeptoo	2012 London	Athletics	Women's Marathon
Silver	Vivian Cheruiyot	2012 London	Athletics	Women's 5000 m
Silver	Abel Kirui	2012 London	Athletics	Men's Marathon
Bronze	Vivian Cheruiyot	2012 London	Athletics	Women's 10000 m
Bronze	Abel Mutai	2012 London	Athletics	Men's 3000 m steeplechase
Bronze	Milcah Chemos Cheywa	2012 London	Athletics	Women's 3000 m steeplechase
Bronze	Timothy Kitum	2012 London	Athletics	Men's 800 m
Bronze	Thomas Longosiwa	2012 London	Athletics	Men's 5000 m
Bronze	Wilson Kipsang Kiprotich	2012 London	Athletics	Men's Marathon
Gold	David Rudisha	2016 Rio de Janeiro	Athletics	Men's 800 m
Gold	Conseslus Kipruto	2016 Rio de Janeiro	Athletics	Men's 3000 m steeplechase
Gold	Eliud Kipchoge	2016 Rio de Janeiro	Athletics	Men's Marathon
Gold	Faith Kipyegon	2016 Rio de Janeiro	Athletics	Women's 1500 m
Gold	Jemimah Sumgong	2016 Rio de Janeiro	Athletics	Women's Marathon
Gold	Vivian Cheruiyot	2016 Rio de Janeiro	Athletics	Women's 5000 m
Silver	Hellen Obiri	2016 Rio de Janeiro	Athletics	Women's 5000 m
Silver	Hyvin Jepkemoi Kiyeng	2016 Rio de Janeiro	Athletics	Women's 3000 m steeplechase
Silver	Vivian Cheruiyot	2016 Rio de Janeiro	Athletics	Women's 10000 m
Silver	Boniface Mucheru Tumuti	2016 Rio de Janeiro	Athletics	Men's 400m hurdles
Silver	Paul Tanui	2016 Rio de Janeiro	Athletics	Men's 10000 m
Silver	Julius Yego	2016 Rio de Janeiro	Athletics	Men's Javelin
Bronze	Margaret Wambui	2016 Rio de Janeiro	Athletics	Women's 800 m
Gold	Emmanuel Korir	2020 Tokyo	Athletics	Men's 800 metres
Gold	Faith Kipyegon	2020 Tokyo	Athletics	Women's 1500 metres
Gold	Peres Jepchirchir	2020 Tokyo	Athletics	Women's marathon
Gold	Eliud Kipchoge	2020 Tokyo	Athletics	Men's marathon
Silver	Hellen Obiri	2020 Tokyo	Athletics	Women's 5000 metres
Silver	Ferguson Rotich	2020 Tokyo	Athletics	Men's 800 metres
Silver	Brigid Kosgei	2020 Tokyo	Athletics	Women's marathon
Silver	Timothy Cheruiyot	2020 Tokyo	Athletics	Men's 1500 metres
Bronze	Benjamin Kigen	2020 Tokyo	Athletics	Men's 3000 metres steeplechase
Bronze	Hyvin Kiyeng Jepkemoi	2020 Tokyo	Athletics	Women's 3000 metres steeplechase
Gold	Beatrice Chebet	2024 Paris	Athletics	Women's 5000 metres
Gold	Beatrice Chebet	2024 Paris	Athletics	Women's 10,000 metres
Gold	Emmanuel Wanyonyi	2024 Paris	Athletics	Men's 800 metres
Gold	Faith Kipyegon	2024 Paris	Athletics	Women's 1500 metres
Silver	Faith Kipyegon	2024 Paris	Athletics	Women's 5000 metres
Silver	Ronald Kwemoi	2024 Paris	Athletics	Men's 5000 metres
Bronze	Mary Moraa	2024 Paris	Athletics	Women's 800 metres
Bronze	Faith Cherotich	2024 Paris	Athletics	Women's 3000 metres steeplechase
Bronze	Abraham Kibiwott	2024 Paris	Athletics	Men's 3000 metres steeplechase
Bronze	Benson Kipruto	2024 Paris	Athletics	Men's marathon
Bronze	Hellen Obiri	2024 Paris	Athletics	Women's marathon

== Multiple medal winners ==
Athlete	Sex	Sport	Events	Years	Gold	Silver	Bronze	Total
Faith Kipyegon	F	Athletics	1500 m, 5000m	2012–2024	3	1	0	4
Kipchoge Keino	M	Athletics	1500 m, 5000 m, 3000 m st.	1964–1972	2	2	0	4
Eliud Kipchoge	M	Athletics	5000 m, marathon	2004–2020	2	1	1	4
Ezekiel Kemboi	M	Athletics	3000 m st.	2004–2016	2	0	0	2
David Rudisha	M	Athletics	800 m	2012–2016	2	0	0	2
Beatrice Chebet	F	Athletics	5000 m, 10,000m	2024	2	0	0	2
Vivian Cheruiyot	F	Athletics	5000 m, 10,000 m	2000–2016	1	2	1	4
Charles Asati	M	Athletics	4 × 400 m	1968–1976	1	1	0	2
Munyoro Nyamau	M	Athletics	4 × 400 m	1968–1972	1	1	0	2
Brimin Kipruto	M	Athletics	3000 m st.	2004–2016	1	1	0	2
Pamela Jelimo	F	Athletics	800 m	2008–2012	1	1	0	2
Julius Sang	M	Athletics	400 m, 4 × 400 m	1968–1972	1	0	1	2
Naftali Temu	M	Athletics	5000 m, 10,000 m	1964–1972	1	0	1	2
Hellen Obiri	F	Athletics	5000 m, Marathon	2016–2024	0	2	1	3
Paul Bitok	M	Athletics	5000 m	1992–1996	0	2	0	2
Paul Tergat	M	Athletics	10,000 m	1996–2000	0	2	0	2
Catherine Ndereba	F	Athletics	Marathon	2004–2008	0	2	0	2
Wilson Kiprugut	M	Athletics	800 m	1964–1968	0	1	1	2
Philip Waruinge	M	Boxing	Featherweight	1968–1972	0	1	1	2
Erick Wainaina	M	Athletics	Marathon	1996–2000	0	1	1	2
Bernard Lagat	M	Athletics	1500 m	2000–2004	0	1	1	2
Hyvin Jepkemoi	F	Athletics	3000 m st.	2016–2020	0	1	1	2

== See also ==
- List of flag bearers for Kenya at the Olympics
- Kenya national athletics team
- Category:Olympic competitors for Kenya
- Kenya at the Paralympics
- Tropical nations at the Winter Olympics
