= Kenya at the 2018 Winter Olympics =

- Flag of Kenya
- IOC code: KEN
- NOC: National Olympic Committee of Kenya
- Website: teamkenya.or.ke

in Pyeongchang, South Korea February 9–25, 2018
- Competitors: 1 in 1 sport
- Flag bearers: Sabrina Simader (opening & closing)
- Medals: Gold 0 Silver 0 Bronze 0 Total 0

Winter Olympics appearances (overview)
- 1998; 2002; 2006; 2010–2014; 2018; 2022; 2026

Kenya competed at the 2018 Winter Olympics in Pyeongchang, South Korea, from 9 to 25 February 2018. The country's participation in Pyeongchang marked its fourth appearance in the Winter Olympics after its debut in the 1998 Games.

Kenya was represented by a lone athlete Sabrina Simader, who served as the country's flag-bearer during the opening and closing ceremonies. Kenya did not win any medal in the Games.

== Background ==
The National Olympic Committee of Kenya was recognized by the International Olympic Committee in 1955. The nation made its first Olympics appearance at the 1956 Summer Olympics, and competed as the British Colony and Protectorate of Kenya from 1956 to 1960 and as the Commonwealth realm of Kenya in 1964. The current edition marked its fourth appearance at the Winter Games after its debut in the 1998 Games.

The 2018 Winter Olympics were held in Pyeongchang, South Korea between 9 and 25 February 2018. Kenya was represented by a lone athlete. Sabrina Simader served as the country's flag-bearer during the opening, and closing ceremony. Philip Boit, Kenya's only prior Winter Olympian, served as the chef de mission for the delegation to Pyeongchang. Kenya did not win a medal in the Games.

== Competitors ==
The Kenyan team consisted of one female alpine skier. Simader became the first woman to compete for the country at the Winter Olympics.

| Sport | Men | Women | Total |
|---|---|---|---|
| Alpine skiing | 0 | 1 | 1 |
| Total | 0 | 1 | 1 |

== Alpine skiing ==
Kenya qualified one female athlete, Sabrina Simader for the alpine skiing events. Simader was born in Kenya, and moved to Austria when she was three years old, where she picked up the sport. She represented the country at the Winter Youth Olympics in 2016 in Lillehammer, Norway. Kenya made its debut in the sport at the Winter Olympics.

The Alpine skiing events were held at the Jeongseon Alpine Centre in Bukpyeong. The course for the events was designed by former Olympic champion Bernhard Russi. The weather was cold and windy during the events, and it was the coldest since the 1994 Winter Olympics at Lillehammer. In the women's slalom event, she did not register a finish. In the super-G event, she was ranked 38th amongst the 44 participants after crossing the line in over one minute and 26 seconds.

| Athlete | Event | Run 1 | | Run 2 | | Total | |
| Athlete | Event | Time | Rank | Time | Rank | Time | Rank |
|---|---|---|---|---|---|---|---|
| Sabrina Simader | Women's giant slalom | 1:23.27 | 59 | DNF | | | |
| Sabrina Simader | Women's super-G | —N/a | | | | 1:26.25 | 38 |

== See also ==
- Kenya at the 2016 Winter Youth Olympics
- Kenya at the 2018 Commonwealth Games
