= Kenya at the 2026 Winter Olympics =

- Flag of Kenya
- IOC code: KEN
- NOC: National Olympic Committee of Kenya
- Website: teamkenya.or.ke

in Milan and Cortina d'Ampezzo, Italy 6 February 2026 – 22 February 2026
- Competitors: 1 (1 man and 0 women) in 1 sport
- Flag bearer (opening): Issa Laborde Dit Pere
- Flag bearer (closing): Issa Laborde Dit Pere
- Medals: Gold 0 Silver 0 Bronze 0 Total 0

Winter Olympics appearances (overview)
- 1998; 2002; 2006; 2010–2014; 2018; 2022; 2026

Kenya competed at the 2026 Winter Olympics in Milan and Cortina d'Ampezzo, Italy, from 6 to 20 February 2026. It was the country's first participation in the Winter Olympics since 2018.

Meanwhile, Issa Laborde Dit Pere was the country's flagbearer during the closing ceremony.

== Competitors ==
The following is the list of competitors participating at the Games per sport/discipline.

Sport	Men	Women	Total
Alpine skiing	1	0	1
Total	1	0	1

== Alpine skiing ==
Kenya qualified one male alpine skier through the basic quota. Sabrina Simader, who had represented the country at the 2018 Winter Olympics, also qualified to compete at these Games, and was nominated by the Kenyan NOC to compete. However, Simader withdrew from the competition and retired from the sport due to lack of financial support.

Athlete	Event	Run 1		Run 2		Total	
Athlete	Event	Time	Rank	Time	Rank	Time	Rank
Issa Laborde Dit Pere	Men's giant slalom	1:29.57	69	1:23.21	67	2:52.78	66
