= Kennedy Ochieng =

Kenyan sprinter

Personal information
- Nationality: Kenyan
- Born: 31 December 1971 (age 54)
- Height: 183 cm (6 ft 0 in)
- Weight: 73 kg (161 lb)

Sport
- Sport: Athletics
- Event: 400m
Medal record
Men's athletics
Representing Kenya
African Championships
Gold medal – first place	1993 Durban	400 m
Gold medal – first place	1993 Durban	4×400 m
Silver medal – second place	1992 Belle Vue Harel	400 m
Bronze medal – third place	1992 Belle Vue Harel	4×400 m

Kennedy Ochieng (born 31 December 1971) is a retired Kenyan sprinter who specialised in the 400 metres and competed at the 1996 Summer Olympics and 2000 Summer Olympics.

== Biography ==
Ochieng won the British AAA Championships title in the 400 metres event at the 1993 AAA Championships.

He was the flagbearer for Kenya at the 2000 Summer Olympics in Sydney.

== Achievements ==
Year	Competition	Venue	Position	Event	Notes
Representing Kenya
1990	World Junior Championships	Plovdiv, Bulgaria	11th (sf)	400m	46.88
1990	World Junior Championships	Plovdiv, Bulgaria	8th	4 × 400 m relay	3:07.86
1992	African Championships	Belle Vue Maurel, Mauritius	2nd	400 m	46.23
1993	World Championships	Stuttgart, Germany	8th	400 m	45.68
1993	World Championships	Stuttgart, Germany	2nd	4 × 400 m relay	2:59.82
1993	African Championships	Durban, South Africa	1st	400 m	45.29
1996	Olympic Games	Atlanta, United States	5th (h)	4 × 400 m relay	3:02.52
1998	Commonwealth Games	Kuala Lumpur, Malaysia	8th	400 m	45.56
1999	All-Africa Games	Johannesburg, South Africa	1st	400 m	44.77

Olympic Games
Preceded by Philip Boit	Flagbearer for Kenya; Sydney 2000	Succeeded by Philip Boit
