= Olympic poster =

Poster advertising the Olympic Games

The Olympic posters are part of the greater promotion plan devised each time by the country hosting the Olympic Games for the better and easier communication of this major sporting event. Olympic posters are closely associated with the place and time of the Games and reflect the social, cultural and sometimes the political context of the host country each time. The Organizing Committee of the host country usually announces an artistic contest for the creation of the posters. Then a special committee decides which entry will be the official poster of the Games. The design process is often given strict guidelines for content, since the committee has already decided the elements it wished to include in the design and the specific messages it must convey.

Although, today the creation of a poster is deemed necessary, in the first modern Olympic Games there were no posters specially designed for the Games. The first official poster that was specially designed for the Olympic Games, following the approval of the competent committee, was the poster for the 1912 Games held in Stockholm. The poster depicted the march of the nations represented by athletes holding their national flags. All posters are the property of the IOC.

== Olympic posters ==
=== Summer Olympic poster designs ===
Games	Host	Design	Designer(s)	Image	Ref
1896	Athens, Greece				
1900	Paris, France	It shows the Exposition medal on top of the Eiffel Tower			
1904	St. Louis, United States	It shows the Olympic venues during the 1904 Expo			
1908	London, Great Britain				
1912	Stockholm, Sweden				
1920	Antwerp, Belgium	It shows a man holding a ball while being surrounded with flags and the Cathedral of Our Lady			
1924	Paris, France				
1928	Amsterdam, Netherlands				
1932	Los Angeles, United States				
1936	Berlin, Nazi Germany				
1948	London, Great Britain	It shows a statue of a discus thrower in front of the Palace of Westminster			
1952	Helsinki, Finland				
1956	Melbourne, Australia				
1960	Rome, Italy				
1964	Tokyo, Japan				
1968	Mexico City, Mexico				
1972	Munich, West Germany				
1976	Montreal, Canada				
1980	Moscow, Soviet Union				
1984	Los Angeles, United States	It shows the logo of the 1984 Summer Olympics with images of the host country.	Robert Rauschenberg	Link to poster	
1988	Seoul, South Korea				
1992	Barcelona, Spain				
1996	Atlanta, United States				
2000	Sydney, Australia				
2004	Athens, Greece				
2008	Beijing, China				
2012	London, Great Britain				
2016	Rio de Janeiro, Brazil				
2020	Tokyo, Japan				
2024	Paris, France		Ugo Gattoni		
2028	Los Angeles, United States				
2032	Brisbane, Australia				

=== Winter Olympic poster designs ===
Games	Host	Design	Designer(s)	Image	Ref
1924	Paris, France	It shows an eagle holding a branch while looking at bobsleghers			
1928	St. Moritz, Switzerland				
1932	Lake Placid, United States				
1936	Garmisch-Partenkirchen, Germany				
1948	St. Moritz, Switzerland				
1952	Oslo, Norway				
1956	Cortina d'Ampezzo, Italy				
1960	Squaw Valley, United States				
1964	Innsbruck, Austria				
1968	Grenoble, France	The poster shows the Olympic rings screaming down a mountain.	Jean Brain	Link to poster	
1972	Sapporo, Japan	The poster shows the logo of the 1972 Winter Olympics on top of Mount Asahi and Shikotsu-Tōya National Park	Takashi Kono	Link to poster	
1976	Innsbruck, Austria	The poster shows the Olympic rings on the tip of a skate blade forming an "i" for Innsbruck.	Arthur Zelger	Link to poster	
1980	Lake Placid, United States	It shows the logo for the 1980 Winter Olympics			
1984	Sarajevo, Yugoslavia	It shows the logo for the 1984 Winter Olympics in front of a snowflake falling from the sky		Link to poster	
1988	Calgary, Canada	It shows the logo for the 1988 Winter Olympics on top of Calgary		Link to poster	
1992	Albertville, France				
1994	Lillehammer, Norway				
1998	Nagano, Japan				
2002	Salt Lake City, United States				
2006	Turin, Italy				
2010	Vancouver, Canada				
2014	Sochi, Russia				
2018	Pyeongchang, South Korea				
2022	Beijing, China				
2026	Milan and Cortina d'Ampezzo, Italy				
2030	French Alps, France				
2034	Utah, United States				

== See also ==
- Olympic emblem
- Olympic symbols
