= Violet Barasa =

Kenyan volleyball player

- in 2004

Personal information
- Full name: Violet Awindi Barasa
- Nationality: Kenyan
- Born: June 21, 1975; Kenya
- Died: February 12, 2007 (aged 31); Kenya

Violet Awindi Barasa (Born June 21, 1975, Sikhendu village, Webuye, Bungoma District, Kenya , ) was a volleyball player from Kenya. Her surname is sometimes spelled as Baraza.

She was a long-time captain for the Kenyan women's national volleyball team. Baraza represented Kenya in the 2000 and 2004 Olympic Games, three times in the World Championship and in numerous continental events.

== Life ==
Barasa was born in 1975 and she attended Lugulu High School which is known for its support for volleyball. She began by playing volleyball for the Kenya Commercial Bank and from there she was included in Kenya women's national volleyball team.

She was one of the few Kenyan players to play professional volleyball abroad, for Al Ahly in Egypt, Vileo and Unic-Romania in Romania, Panellinios in Greece and Dicle University in Turkey.

As national team captain she led the national team to its appearances at the 2000 Summer Olympics and the 2004 Summer Olympics.

She died in February 2007 at the Webuye District Hospital of undisclosed causes. At the time of her death, she was still an active player with the Kenya Commercial Bank volleyball club, although she had been dropped from the national team. After her death volleyball matches were postponed in Kenya until after her funeral as a mark of respect.

Olympic Games
Preceded by Philip Boit	Flagbearer for Kenya; Athens 2004	Succeeded by Philip Boit
