= Alpine skiing at the 2018 Winter Olympics – Women's super-G =

Women's super-G at the XXIII Olympic Winter Games
- Alpine skiing
- Venue: Jeongseon Alpine Centre, Gangwon Province, South Korea
- Date: 17 February 2018
- Competitors: 44 from 23 nations
- Winning time: 1.21.11

Medalists
1st place, gold medalist(s)		Ester Ledecká	Czech Republic
2nd place, silver medalist(s)		Anna Veith	Austria
3rd place, bronze medalist(s)		Tina Weirather	Liechtenstein

Women's Super-G
- Location: Jeongseon Alpine Centre
- Vertical: 585 m (1,919 ft)
- Top elevation: 1,130 m (3,707 ft)
- Base elevation: 545 m (1,788 ft)

The women's super-G competition of the PyeongChang 2018 Olympics was held at the Jeongseon Alpine Centre in PyeongChang on Saturday, 17 February.

== Qualification ==
A total of up to 320 alpine skiers qualified across all eleven events. Athletes qualified for this event by having met the A qualification standard only, which meant having 80 or less FIS Points and being ranked in the top 500 in the Olympic FIS points list. The Points list takes into average the best results of athletes per discipline during the qualification period (1 July 2016 to 21 January 2018). Countries received additional quotas by having athletes ranked in the top 30 of the current World Cup season (two per gender maximum, overall across all events). After the distribution of B standard quotas (to nations competing only in the slalom and giant slalom events), the remaining quotas were distributed using the Olympic FIS Points list, with each athlete only counting once for qualification purposes. A country could only enter a maximum of four athletes for the event.

== Summary ==
Ester Ledecká became the Olympic champion. She received her first Olympic medal and the first gold medal in alpine skiing for the Czech Republic. The defending champion Anna Veith (competing as Fenninger in 2014) was second, and Tina Weirather was third, the first Olympic medal for Liechtenstein since 1988. The results were extraordinarily dense, with 0.01 seconds separating gold and silver medals, as well as bronze medal from the fourth place (Lara Gut). Ledecká's victory was completely unexpected, as she had been much better known for her snowboarding achievements. She subsequently won the parallel giant slalom snowboarding competition at the same Olympics.

Lindsey Vonn, starting first, was leading until her time was improved by Johanna Schnarf, then Lara Gut. Weirather, skiing seventh, improved Gut's time by 0.01 seconds, pushing Vonn, 0.26 seconds behind, off the podium. Starting 15th, Veith took the lead, with the main competitors either not finishing or posting inferior times, so that she believed her first place was assured, and some agencies announced her as a champion. However, the surprising champion was Ledecká who started 26th and improved Veith's time by 0.01. Ledecká's relative lack of experience in the super-G event might have led to her victory, as she took a more aggressive line that other, more experienced skiers shied away from. After the finish, Ledecká did not believe she won and thought that somebody else's time was shown by mistake.

The race course was 2.010 km (1.25 mi) in length, with a vertical drop of 585 m (1,919 ft) from a starting elevation of 1,130 m (3,707 ft) above sea level. Ledecká's winning time of 81.11 seconds yielded an average speed of 89.212 km/h (55.4 mph) and an average vertical descent rate of 7.212 m/s (23.7 ft/s).

== Results ==
The race was started at 12:00 local time, (UTC+9). At the starting gate, the skies were clear, the temperature was −9 °C (16 °F), and the snow condition was hard.

Rank	Bib	Name	Country	Time	Behind
1st place, gold medalist(s)	26	Ester Ledecká	Czech Republic	1:21.11	—
2nd place, silver medalist(s)	15	Anna Veith	Austria	1:21.12	+0.01
3rd place, bronze medalist(s)	7	Tina Weirather	Liechtenstein	1:21.22	+0.11
4	5	Lara Gut	Switzerland	1:21.23	+0.12
5	3	Johanna Schnarf	Italy	1:21.27	+0.16
6	11	Federica Brignone	Italy	1:21.49	+0.38
6	1	Lindsey Vonn	United States	1:21.49	+0.38
8	19	Cornelia Hütter	Austria	1:21.54	+0.43
9	16	Michelle Gisin	Switzerland	1:21.57	+0.46
10	14	Viktoria Rebensburg	Germany	1:21.62	+0.51
11	13	Sofia Goggia	Italy	1:21.65	+0.54
12	4	Nadia Fanchini	Italy	1:21.88	+0.77
13	17	Ragnhild Mowinckel	Norway	1:22.00	+0.89
14	28	Breezy Johnson	United States	1:22.14	+1.03
15	12	Laurenne Ross	United States	1:22.17	+1.06
16	27	Alice McKennis	United States	1:22.20	+1.09
17	6	Corinne Suter	Switzerland	1:22.24	+1.13
18	9	Nicole Schmidhofer	Austria	1:22.30	+1.19
19	20	Romane Miradoli	France	1:22.36	+1.25
20	22	Jennifer Piot	France	1:22.38	+1.27
21	18	Tamara Tippler	Austria	1:22.50	+1.39
22	10	Tiffany Gauthier	France	1:22.56	+1.45
23	23	Valérie Grenier	Canada	1:22.77	+1.66
24	25	Lisa Hörnblad	Sweden	1:22.79	+1.68
25	30	Maruša Ferk	Slovenia	1:23.18	+2.07
26	33	Maryna Gąsienica-Daniel	Poland	1:23.21	+2.10
27	8	Jasmine Flury	Switzerland	1:23.30	+2.19
28	2	Tessa Worley	France	1:23.54	+2.43
29	24	Candace Crawford	Canada	1:23.69	+2.58
30	32	Alexandra Coletti	Monaco	1:24.01	+2.90
31	35	Greta Small	Australia	1:24.09	+2.98
32	31	Petra Vlhová	Slovakia	1:24.26	+3.15
33	36	Kateřina Pauláthová	Czech Republic	1:24.48	+3.37
34	38	Tina Robnik	Slovenia	1:24.49	+3.38
35	34	Barbara Kantorová	Slovakia	1:25.30	+4.19
36	43	Ania Monica Caill	Romania	1:25.74	+4.63
37	29	Roni Remme	Canada	1:25.90	+4.79
38	41	Sabrina Simader	Kenya	1:26.25	+5.14
39	37	Noelle Barahona	Chile	1:27.16	+6.05
40	40	Kim Vanreusel	Belgium	1:27.60	+6.49
41	39	Sarah Schleper	Mexico	1:27.93	+6.82
42	42	Elvedina Muzaferija	Bosnia and Herzegovina	1:27.97	+6.86
43	45	Olha Knysh	Ukraine	1:30.60	+9.49
	21	Kira Weidle	Germany	DNF	
	44	Maria Shkanova	Belarus	DNS	
