= Sabrina Simader =

Kenyan alpine skier (born 1998)

Personal information
- Full name: Sabrina Wanjiku Simader
- Born: 13 April 1998 (age 28) Kilifi, Kenya

Skiing career
- Sport: Alpine skiing ♀
- Disciplines: Downhill, giant slalom, super-G
- World Cup debut: 7 January 2017 (age 18)

Olympics
- Teams: 1 – (2018)

World Championships
- Teams: 3 – (2017–2021)

World Cup
- Seasons: 4 – (2017–2020)
Medal record
Women's alpine skiing
Representing Kenya

Sabrina Wanjiku Simader (born 13 April 1998) is a Kenyan alpine skier.

== Early life ==
Simader was born in Kilifi, Kenya and moved to Austria when she was three years old with her Kenyan mother and Austrian step-father. Her step-father owned a ski lift and trained Simader in skiing during her childhood. She grew up in Sankt Johann am Wimberg and later the family moved to Haus im Ennstal from where Simader would go to Schihauptschule Schladming, one of the few secondary schools focussed on skiing in Austria.

== Career ==
=== 2016 Winter Youth Olympics ===
Simader represented Kenya at the Winter Youth Olympics in 2016 in Lillehammer, Norway.

=== 2018 Winter Olympics ===
Simader competed for Kenya at the 2018 Winter Olympics in the alpine skiing events. Simader became the first female and alpine skier to compete for Kenya at the Winter Olympics.

== World Cup results ==
=== Results per discipline ===
Discipline	WC starts	WC Top 30	WC Top 15	WC Top 5	WC Podium	Best result		
Discipline	WC starts	WC Top 30	WC Top 15	WC Top 5	WC Podium	Date	Location	Place
Slalom	0	0	0	0	0			
Giant slalom	2	0	0	0	0	15 February 2020	Kranjska Gora, Slovenia	45th
Super-G	10	0	0	0	0	23 January 2022	Cortina d'Ampezzo, Italy	33rd
Downhill	10	0	0	0	0	26 January 2024	Cortina d'Ampezzo, Italy	39th
Combined	1	0	0	0	0	23 February 2020	Crans-Montana, Switzerland	DNS2
Total	23	0	0	0	0			

- Standings through 8 February 2025

== World Championship results ==
Year
Year	Age	Slalom	Giant; Slalom	Super G	Downhill	Combined	Team Event
2017	18	50	60	39	—	—	—
2019	20	Did not participate					
2021	22	—	—	DSQ	—	—	—
2023	24	—	—	31	26	—	—
2025	26			DSQ	28		

== Olympic results ==
Year
Year	Age	Slalom	Giant; Slalom	Super G	Downhill	Combined	Team event
2018	19	—	DNF2	38	—	—	—

== Other results ==
=== European Cup results ===
==== Season standings ====
Season	Age	Overall	Slalom	Giant slalom	Super-G	Downhill	Combined
2020	21	148	—	—	57	—	—
2021	22	—	—	—	—	—	—

==== Results per discipline ====
Discipline	EC starts	EC Top 30	EC Top 15	EC Top 5	EC Podium	Best result		
Discipline	EC starts	EC Top 30	EC Top 15	EC Top 5	EC Podium	Date	Location	Place
Slalom	0	0	0	0	0			
Giant slalom	0	0	0	0	0			
Super-G	6	1	0	0	0	19 February 2020	Sarentino, Italy	19th
Downhill	6	0	0	0	0	19 February 2022	Crans-Montana, Switzerland	41st
Combined	2	0	0	0	0	DNS2 2 times		
Total	14	1	0	0	0			

- Standings through 7 February 2023

Olympic Games
Preceded by Shehzana Anwar	Flagbearer for Kenya; Pyeongchang 2018	Succeeded by Incumbent
