= Shehzana Anwar =

Kenyan archer (born 1989)

Personal information
- Born: 21 August 1989 (age 36) Nairobi
- Height: 160 cm (5 ft 3 in)
- Weight: 55 kg (121 lb)

Sport
- Country: Kenya
- Sport: Archery
- Event: Recurve
- Updated on 26 July 2016

Shehzana Anwar (born 21 August 1989 in Nairobi) is a female Kenyan recurve archer. She competed in the archery competition at the 2016 Summer Olympics in Rio de Janeiro, where she was the Kenyan flagbearer. She was defeated by Ki Bo-bae of South Korea during the first round of the women's individual competition.

Olympic Games
Preceded by Jason Dunford	Flagbearer for Kenya; Rio de Janeiro 2016	Succeeded by Mercy Moim & Andrew Amonde
