= Nicoletta Manni =

Italian ballet dancer (born 1991)

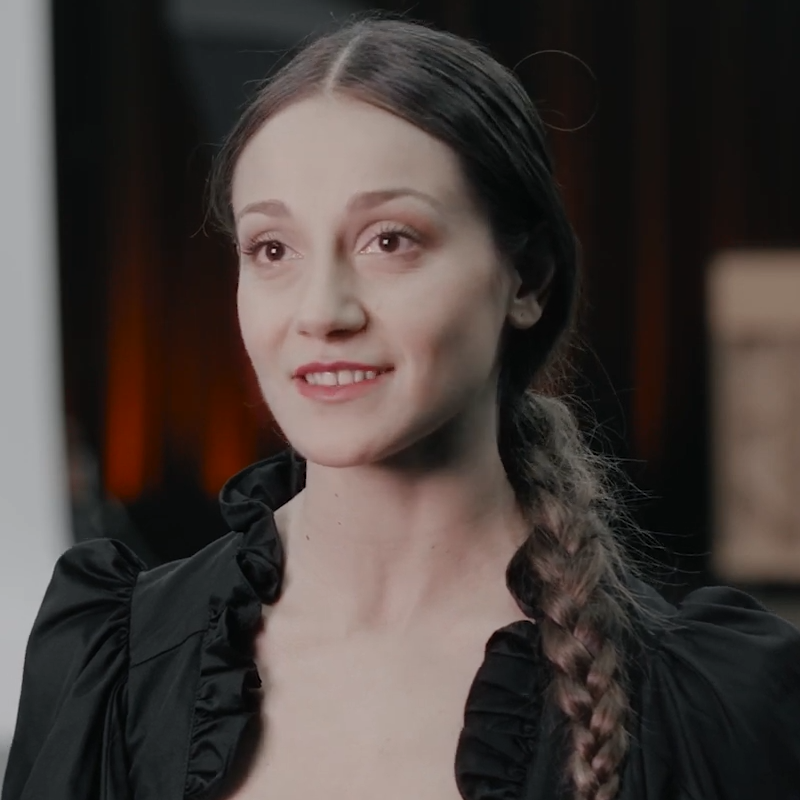
Image of Nicoletta Manni

Nicoletta Manni (born 1991) is an Italian ballet dancer. A member of the La Scala Theatre Ballet since 2009, she was promoted to prima ballerina in April 2014. In November 2023, she became La Scala's first Etoile, or star principal dancer, chosen from the storied ballet company in nearly 40 years.

Born in Galatina, in the province of Lecce in the south-east of Italy, Manni began dancing as a small child, encouraged by her mother Anna De Matteis. When she was 12, she began training at the La Scala Theatre Ballet School, graduating in 2009. When she was 17, she joined the Berlin State Ballet but returned to La Scala four years later in 2013, performing as Myrta in Giselle and Odette/Odile in Swan Lake. She has also performed as a soloist in George Balanchine's Rubies.
