= 2026 Winter Olympics =

Multi-sport event in Italy

XXV Olympic Winter Games
- Location: Milan and Cortina d'Ampezzo, Italy
- Motto: IT's Your Vibe (Note: Only an English motto was used during the Games. There was no Italian equivalent of the motto adopted.)
- Nations: 92 (including AIN)
- Athletes: 2,884 (1,535 men, 1,349 women)
- Events: 116 in 8 sports (16 disciplines)
- Opening: 6 February 2026
- Closing: 22 February 2026
- Opened by: President Sergio Mattarella
- Closed by: IOC President Kirsty Coventry
- Cauldron: Deborah Compagnoni and Alberto Tomba (Milan); Sofia Goggia (Cortina d'Ampezzo)
- Stadium: Stadio San Siro (Note: Named "Milano San Siro Olympic Stadium" during the Games.) (Opening ceremony); Verona Arena (Note: Named "Verona Olympic Arena" during the Games.) (Closing ceremony)

The 2026 Winter Olympics (Italian: Olimpiadi invernali del 2026), officially the XXV Olympic Winter Games and commonly known as Milano Cortina 2026, were an international winter multi-sport event held from 6 to 22 February 2026, at multiple sites across Lombardy, Veneto and Trentino-Alto Adige/Südtirol, with competition in selected events beginning on 4 February 2026. Featuring the debut of ski mountaineering as a Winter Olympic event, Milano Cortina 2026 was the first Olympic Games under the IOC presidency of Kirsty Coventry.

A joint bid by Milan and Cortina d'Ampezzo was awarded on 24 June 2019, at the 134th IOC Session in Lausanne, Switzerland, in preference to another joint bid made by Stockholm and Åre, Sweden. The 2026 Olympic Games were the first to be officially co-hosted by two cities. Milan primarily hosted the ice events, while the remaining events were hosted in clusters around Cortina, Livigno, and Fiemme. These were the third Winter Olympics, and the fourth Olympics overall, to be hosted by Italy, as Cortina d'Ampezzo had previously hosted the 1956 Winter Olympics and Torino hosted the 2006 Winter Olympics.

Norway finished at the top of the medal table for the fourth successive Winter Olympics with 18 gold and 41 medals overall, setting a new record for the largest number of gold and total medals won at a single Winter Olympics. The United States finished second with 12 gold and 33 medals overall, making this the team's most successful Winter Olympics in terms of gold medals. The Netherlands finished in a tie for third with 10 gold and 20 medals overall, also marking this the team's most successful Winter Olympics in terms of gold medals. The host nation Italy finished in a tie for third with 10 gold, but finished fourth due to having fewer silvers and 30 medals overall, setting a new record for number of medals won. Brazil won the first medal, already a gold medal, in their Winter Olympic history; also the first tropical, Latin American, and South American National Olympic Committee to win a medal at the Winter Olympics. Georgia also won the first medal in their Winter Olympic history. Despite early concerns and controversies relating to logistics, the Games were considered a success by the press and observers upon their conclusion.

== Bidding process ==
=== Host city selection ===
Milan and Cortina d'Ampezzo were selected as the host cities on 24 June 2019, at the 134th IOC Session in Lausanne, Switzerland. The three Italian International Olympic Committee (IOC) members (Franco Carraro, Ivo Ferriani, and Giovanni Malagò) and two Swedish IOC members (Gunilla Lindberg and Stefan Holm) were ineligible to vote as stated in the Olympic Charter.

2026 Winter Olympics bidding results
City	Nation	Votes
Milan and Cortina d'Ampezzo	Italy	47
Stockholm and Åre	Sweden	34
One abstention

== Development and preparations ==
=== Venues ===
Facilities of the 2026 Winter Olympics.
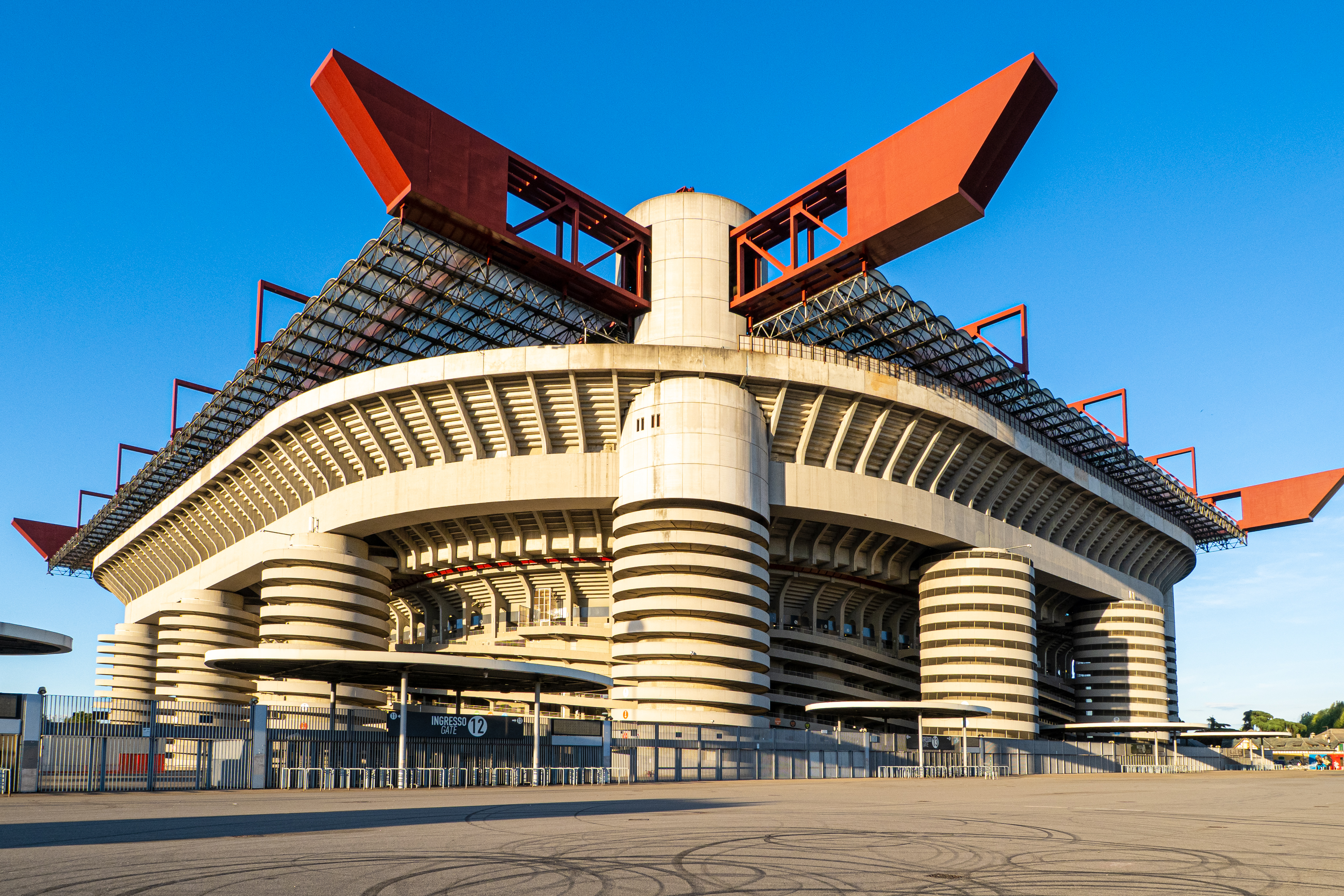

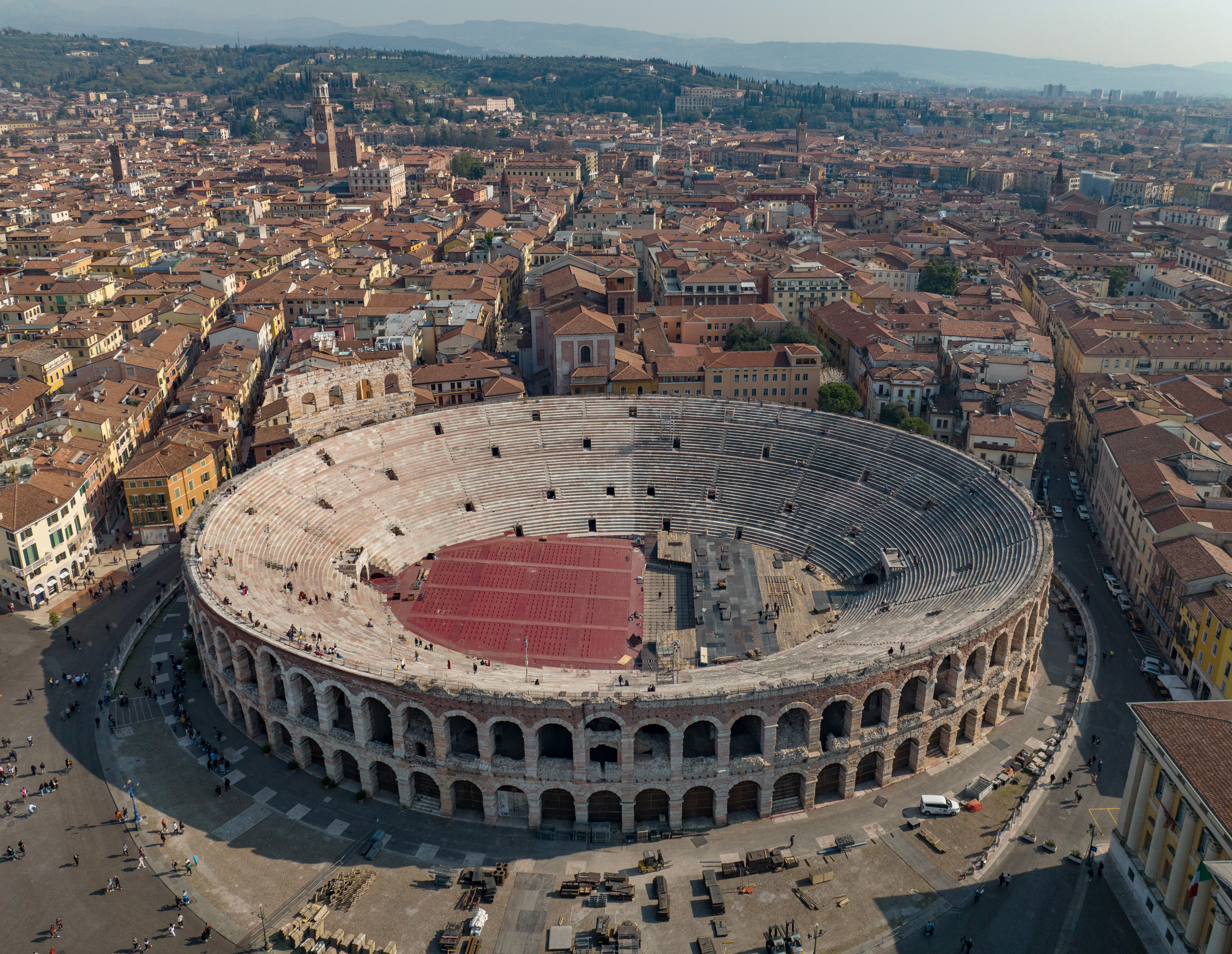
Stadio San Siro in Milan (top) and Verona Arena (bottom) are the venues of opening and closing ceremonies, respectively.

The Games primarily utilised existing venues across Lombardy, Veneto and Trentino-Alto Adige/Südtirol, including those used by the 1956 Winter Olympics previously held in Cortina d'Ampezzo, and by the 2013 Winter Universiade hosted by the province of Trentino. Most ice events, aside from curling, were held in the Milan cluster, while sliding and snow events were held in clusters around Cortina, Valtellina, and the Fiemme Valley. A new 12,000-seat multi-use arena designed by David Chipperfield was constructed in Milan's Santa Giulia district and hosted ice hockey. Stadio San Siro in Milan hosted the opening ceremony, and the historic Verona Arena in Verona hosted the closing ceremony. Athletes stayed in several Olympic villages, depending on the location of their sport: Milan Olympic Village, Cortina d'Ampezzo Olympic Village, or in hotels.

==== Milan cluster ====
Venue	Events	Capacity	Status
Milano San Siro Olympic Stadium	Opening ceremony	75,817	Existing
Milano Santa Giulia Ice Hockey Arena	Ice hockey (preliminaries and finals)	12,000	New
Milano Rho Ice Hockey Arena	Ice hockey (preliminaries)	6,000	Existing with temporary stands
Milano Speed Skating Stadium	Speed skating	7,500	Existing with temporary stands
Milano Ice Skating Arena	Figure skating	11,500	Existing
Milano Ice Skating Arena	Short track speed skating	11,500	Existing

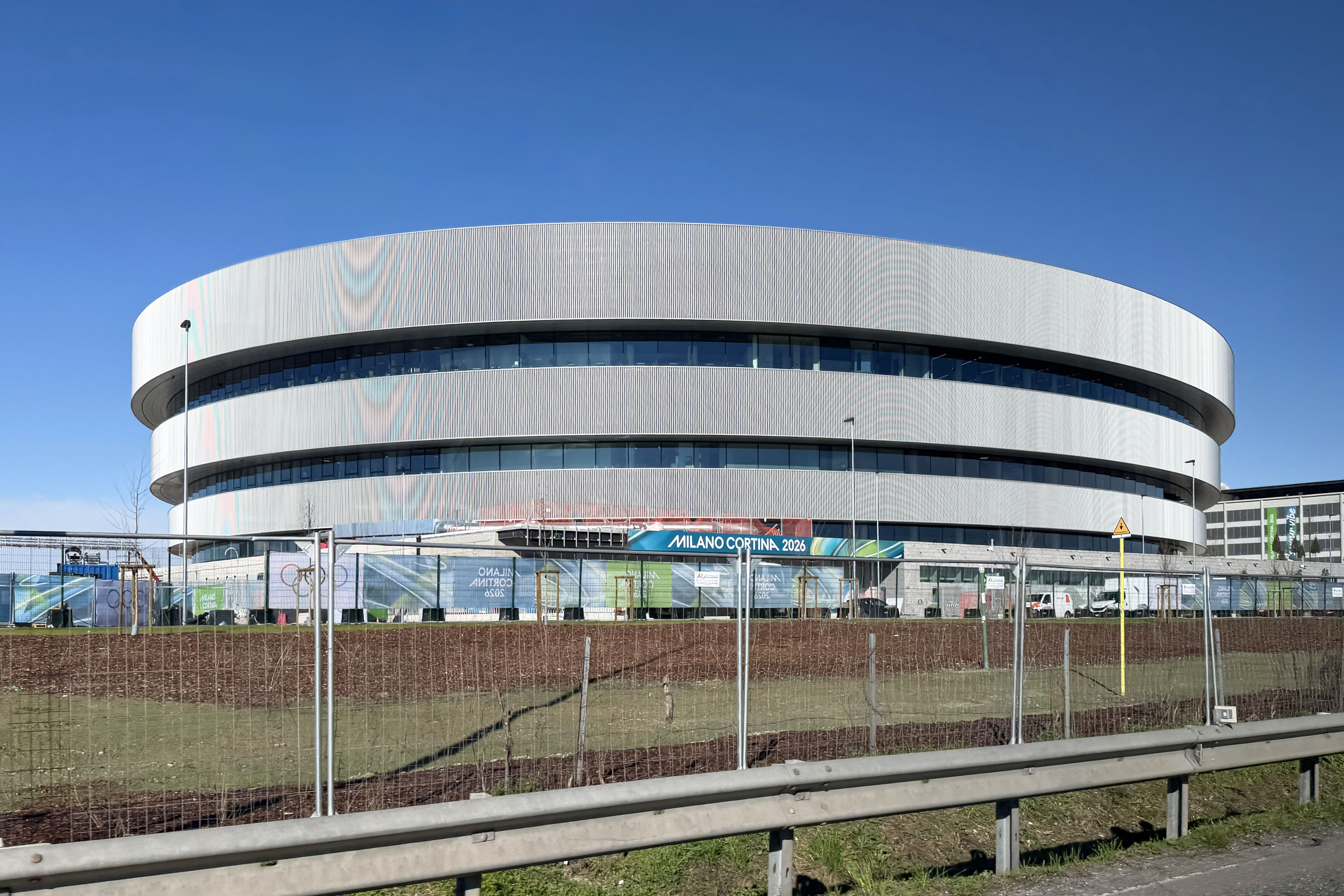
Santa Giulia Ice Hockey Arena

==== Cortina d'Ampezzo cluster ====
Venue	Events	Capacity	Status
Tofane Alpine Skiing Centre	Alpine skiing (women)	7,000	Existing
Anterselva Biathlon Arena	Biathlon	19,000	Existing
Cortina Curling Olympic Stadium	Curling	3,000	Existing
Cortina Sliding Centre	Bobsleigh	5,500	New
Cortina Sliding Centre	Luge	5,500	New
Cortina Sliding Centre	Skeleton	5,500	New

==== Valtellina cluster ====
Venue	Events	Capacity	Status
Stelvio Ski Centre	Alpine skiing (men)	7,000	Existing
Stelvio Ski Centre	Ski mountaineering	7,000	Existing
Livigno Snow Park	Snowboarding	2,000	Existing
Livigno Snow Park	Freestyle skiing	8,400	Existing
Livigno Aerials & Moguls Park	Freestyle skiing	3,000	Existing

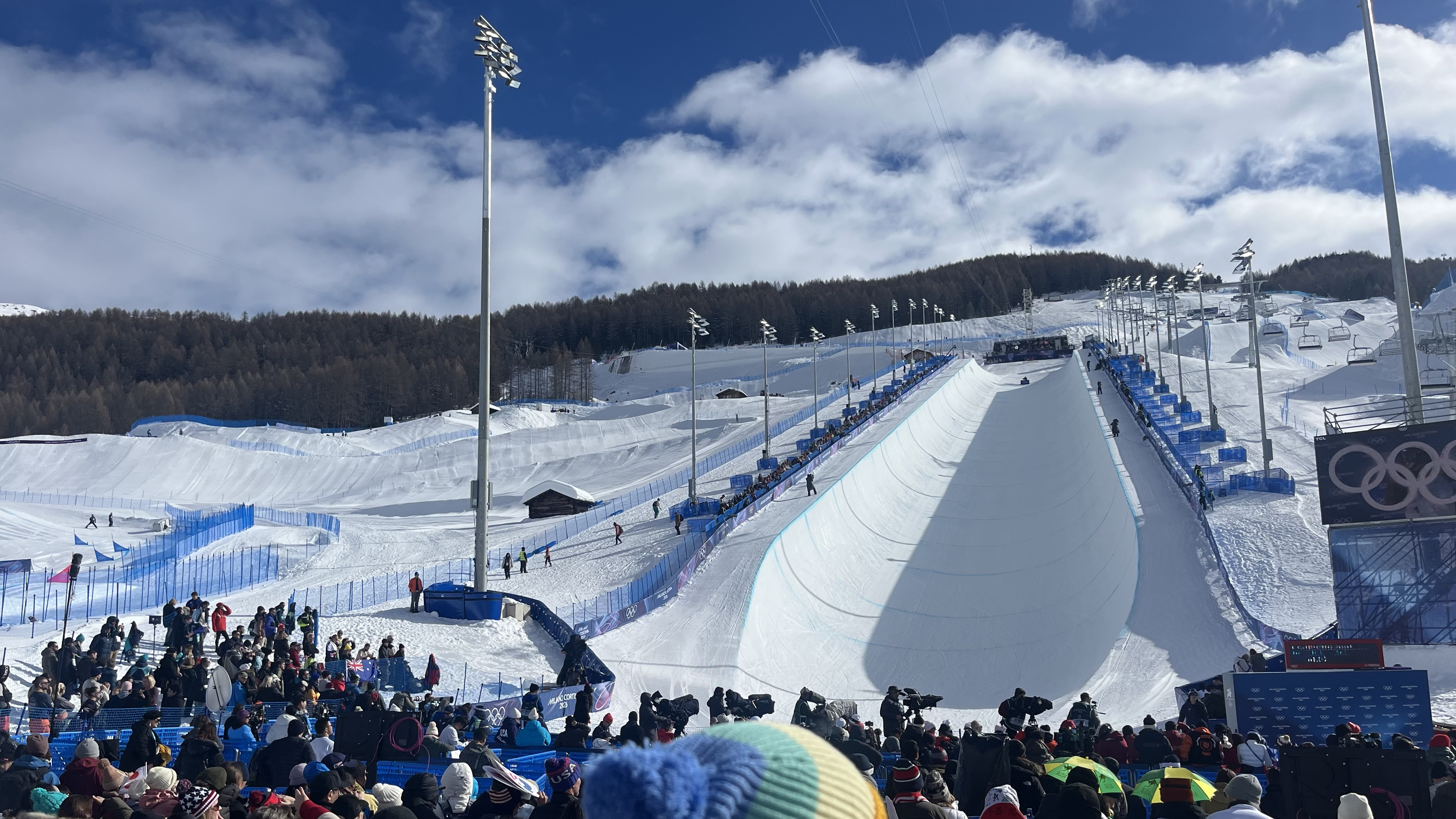
The half-pipe at Livigno Snow Park

==== Val di Fiemme cluster ====
Venue	Events	Capacity	Status
Predazzo Ski Jumping Stadium	Ski jumping	5,000	Existing
Predazzo Ski Jumping Stadium	Nordic combined	5,000	Existing
Tesero Cross-Country Skiing Stadium	Cross-country skiing	15,000	Existing
Tesero Cross-Country Skiing Stadium	Nordic combined	15,000	Existing

==== Verona ====
Venue	Events	Capacity	Status
Verona Olympic Arena	Closing ceremony	15,000	Existing

=== Speed skating venue selection ===
During the bidding process, the bidding committee proposed that the speed skating events could be held at the existing Ice Rink Piné in Baselga di Piné. Despite the infrastructure being ready, it required a roof, which impact and cost studies indicated would be costly, potentially exceeding the budget. The committee deliberated three choices: building an ice rink in the pavilions of Fiera Milano (with a possibility to be permanent or temporary), options that would require significant structural work, or moving the events to the Oval Lingotto in the city of Turin, which required no structural changes.

The Turin venue was constructed to host speed skating during the 2006 Winter Olympics; after the Games, it hosted events such as exhibitions, fairs, and conferences. The venue hosted the same sport in the 2007 Winter Universiade, but it has remained iceless since. In April 2023, it was estimated that the temporary ice rink in Fiera Milano would cost nearly €20 million, which would be paid for with private funds. The proposal to use Turin's Oval Lingotto received opposition from Milan-area officials, as Turin was part of the initial stages of the project but later withdrew. One of the spokespersons to reject this proposal was Giuseppe Sala (the mayor of Milan) and officials from the host regions of Lombardy and Veneto. Fiera Milano was confirmed as the speed skating venue in April 2023.

=== Olympic torch ===
The Olympic torch relay started on 26 November 2025, with the flame lighting in Olympia, Greece, and concluded on 6 February 2026, in Milan, Italy, coinciding with the opening ceremony at Stadio San Siro. Along with the 13 regional units and seven regions in Greece, the flame visited the 110 provinces of Italy, making 60 stops over 63 days across 12,000 kilometres (7,500 mi). The Olympic torch was unveiled on 14 April 2025, in parallel events held in Milan and Osaka, Japan. It was simultaneously revealed at the Triennale di Milano and at the Italian pavilion at Expo 2025 as a way of connecting the two sister cities, as Milan had previously hosted Expo 2015. The Olympic torch is light blue, whereas the corresponding Paralympic torch is bronze coloured. Named "Essential"; developed by Eni and its subsidiary Versalis, designed by Studio Carlo Ratti Associati and produced in Italy by Cavagna Group, the torches are made primarily of an alloy of recycled aluminium and bronze. They run bio-LPG, a fuel made from renewable materials, produced at the Enilive biorefinery in Gela, and have been designed to be refilled up to ten times in order to cut down on the number of torches produced.

Following the lighting of the Olympic flame in Olympia, there was a low-key handover ceremony in Athens on 4 December 2025. The flame then arrived in Rome to visit all 110 provinces of Italy, involving 10,001 torchbearers. The torch was in Naples for Christmas, in Bari for New Year's Eve, and in Cortina d'Ampezzo on 26 January to commemorate the 70th anniversary of it hosting the 1956 Winter Olympics. While the torch was in Piedmont, a tribute was planned for skier Matilde Lorenzi, who died while training in October 2024. The torch relay visited every UNESCO World Heritage Site in Italy. On 29 November 2024, Italian comedy trio Gli Autogol were announced as official narrators for the torch relay.

=== Medals ===
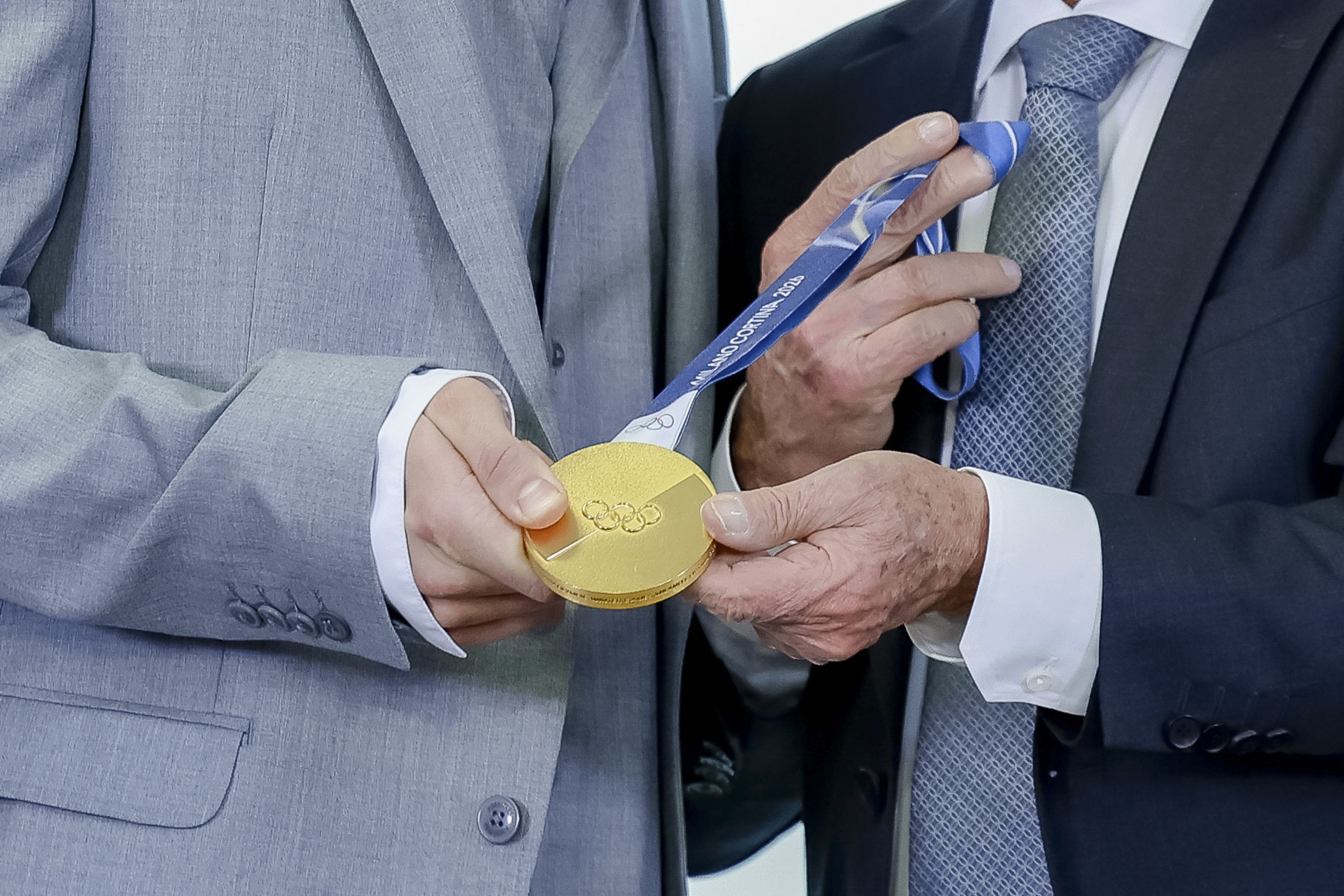
The 2026 Winter Olympics gold medal

On 15 July 2025, the official medals of the Games were unveiled in Venice, designed as two halves that symbolise the culmination of an athlete and Para athlete's journey and of all those who have walked beside them along the way; it was created by the Istituto Poligrafico e Zecca dello Stato (IPZS). The medals featured a design that placed emotion and teamwork at its core. They had the traditional Olympic five-ring symbol on one side, with an inscription on the reverse that detailed the event and commemorated the venue. The medals for several athletes broke after they received them.

== The Games ==
=== Opening ceremony ===
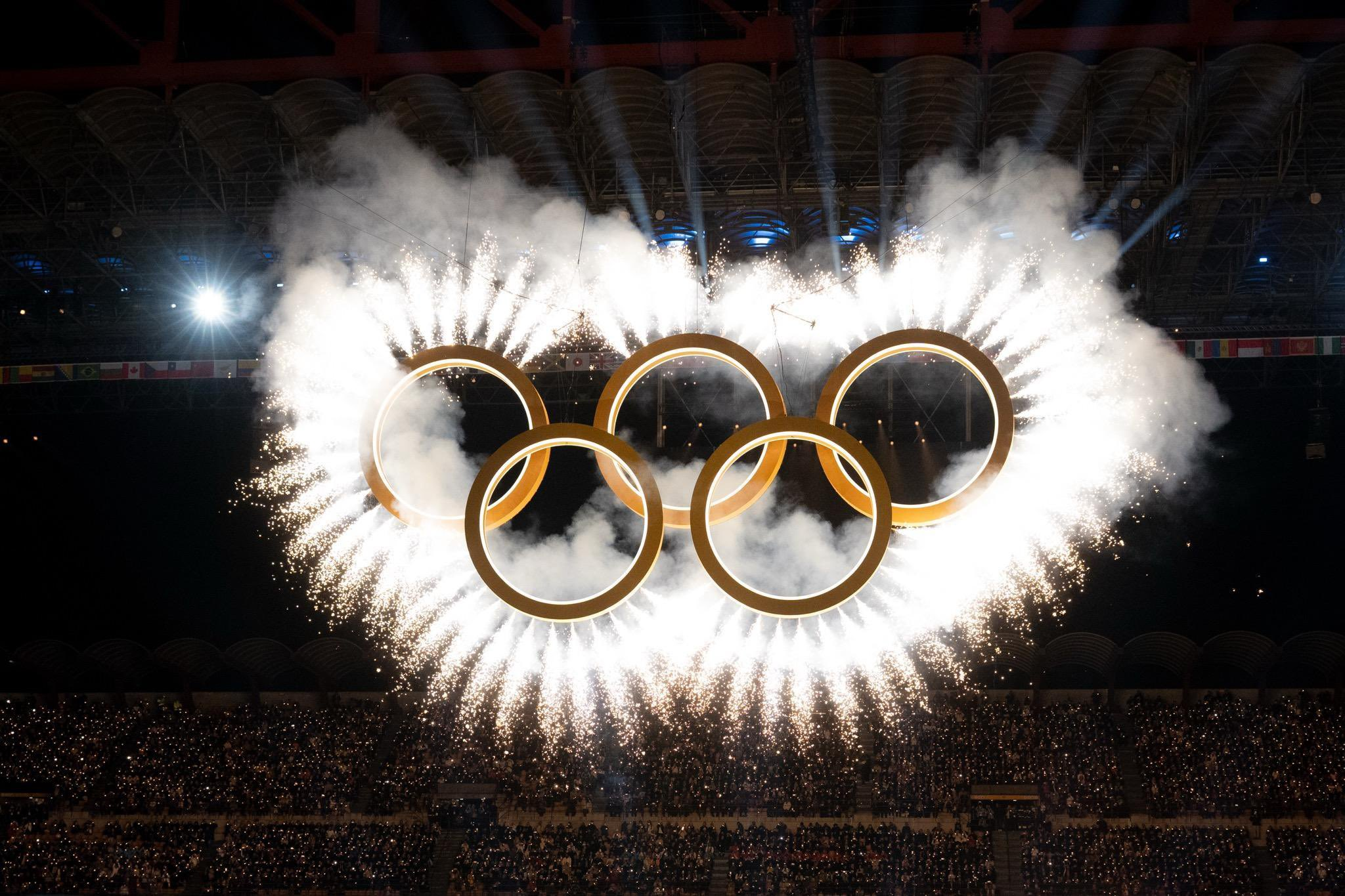
A scene from the opening ceremony; the unveiling of the Olympic rings

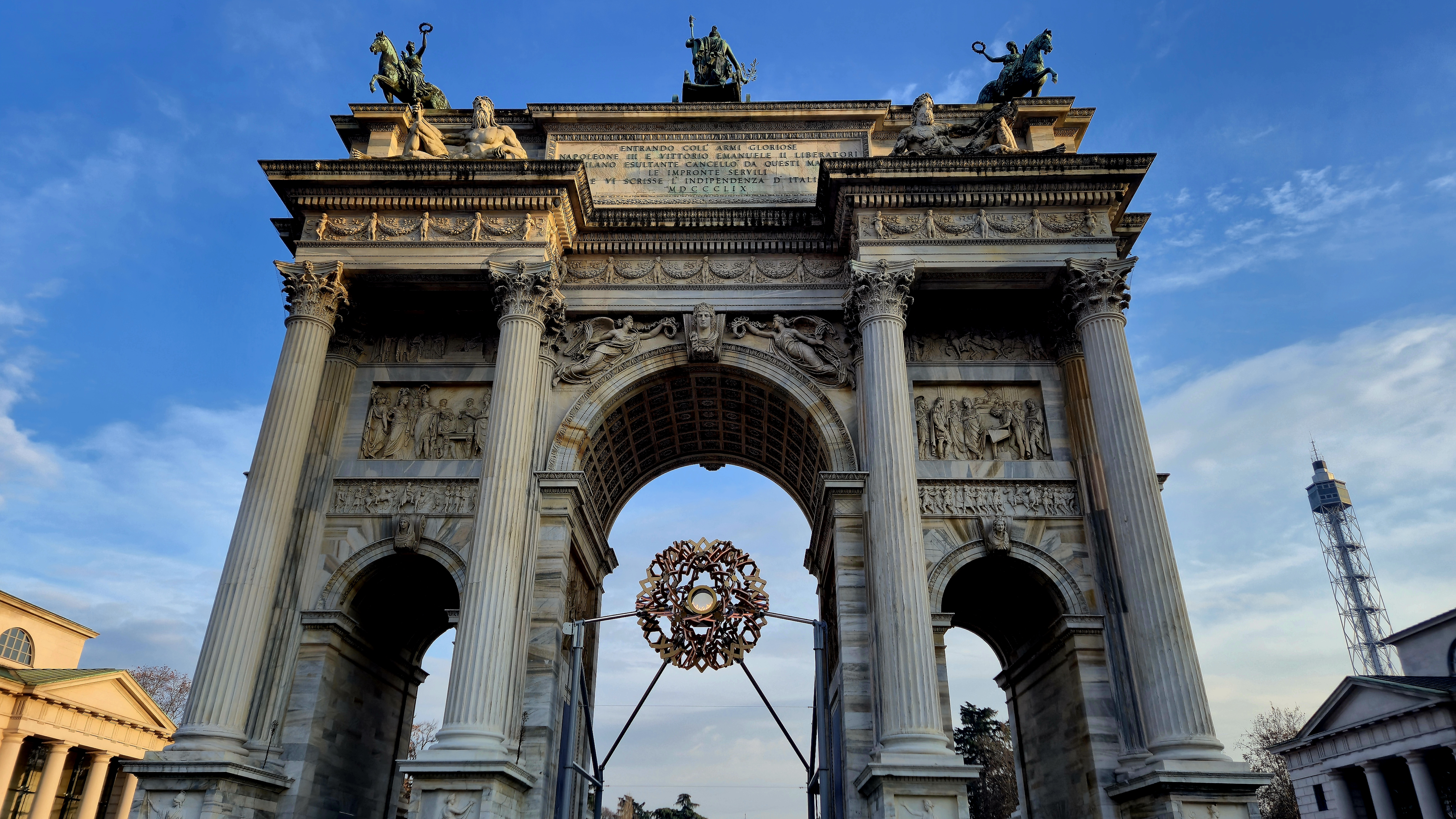
The Olympic cauldron in Milan

The opening ceremony was held on 6 February 2026, at Stadio San Siro in Milan, titled Armonia ("Harmony"). The ceremony was produced by Banijay Live (Balich Wonder Studio). Marco Balich, Creative Lead of the Opening Ceremony, explained that the word harmony derives from Ancient Greek: "It means 'bringing together' in musical terms, different elements." The opening ceremony also featured special performances from American singer Mariah Carey, as well as Italian artists Laura Pausini and Andrea Bocelli. Two Olympic cauldrons were lit in both Milan and Cortina d'Ampezzo, a first in Games' history.

=== Sports ===
The 2026 Winter Olympics featured 116 medal events in 16 disciplines, an increase of seven events and one discipline over Beijing 2022. New medal events included ski mountaineering, men's and women's dual moguls in freestyle skiing, the return of the men's and women's doubles in luge (replacing the open doubles event), men's and women's team combined events in alpine skiing, women's large hill individual in ski jumping, and a mixed relay team event in skeleton. The Games had the highest percentage of women's participation in Winter Olympic history until that point (Nordic combined remained the only Winter Olympic sport in which only men compete), at 47%.

The alpine mixed team parallel event was dropped, while team ski jumping, alpine combined, and Nordic combined all switched to being pairs events. Team combined replaced the individual alpine combined due to evolving technical and training requirements that had diminished its popularity; it was dropped from the FIS Alpine Ski World Cup circuit in 2020, and contested at the Olympics for the final time in 2022. Nordic combined switched to a large hill/2×7.5 km (4.7 mi) course, while women raced the same distances as men in cross-country skiing.

At the 138th IOC Session on 20 July 2021, the IOC approved a proposal by the Fondazione Milano Cortina 2026 to add ski mountaineering as a debuting optional sport. It consisted of three medal events: men's sprint, women's sprint, and mixed relay.

In February 2024, the International Ice Hockey Federation (IIHF) reached an agreement with the National Hockey League (NHL) to allow the league's professional players to participate in the men's hockey tournament for the first time since 2014. NHL players were originally scheduled to return to Olympic hockey in 2022, but the league and its players' union opted out due to the COVID-19 pandemic.

Numbers in parentheses indicate the number of medal events contested in each discipline.

- Alpine skiing (10)
- Biathlon (11)
- Bobsleigh (4)
- Cross-country skiing (12)
- Curling (3)
- Figure skating (5)
- Freestyle skiing (15)
- Ice hockey (2)
- Luge (5)
- Nordic combined (3)
- Short-track speed skating (9)
- Skeleton (3)
- Ski jumping (6)
- Ski mountaineering (3)
- Snowboarding (11)
- Speed skating (14)

=== Closing ceremony ===
The closing ceremony was held at the Verona Arena in Verona on 22 February 2026, entitled "Beauty in Action". Along with cultural segments, the ceremony featured closing remarks and the formal handover to the French Alps as the host region of the 2030 Winter Olympics. The first name confirmed to perform at the closing ceremony was world-renowned ballet dancer Roberto Bolle, the principal dancer at La Scala Theatre Ballet. He and director Alfredo Accatino had previously worked together on the 2006 Winter Olympics opening ceremony. Some sequences of the ceremony were held at the Teatro Filarmonico.

== Participating National Olympic Committees ==
A total of 92 National Olympic Committees (NOCs) had qualified athletes. The Russian and Belarusian NOCs remained suspended for violating the Olympic Truce due to the 2022 Russian invasion of Ukraine. As with the 2024 Summer Olympics in Paris, athletes from Russia and Belarus could compete at the 2026 Games as independent Olympians without national identification, under the banner of "Individual Neutral Athletes" (AIN). The individual neutral athletes had to be approved by their sport's international federation, and then by an IOC panel.

As individual athletes, AIN were not considered a delegation during the opening ceremony or in the medal tables. They were also not allowed to compete in team events like ice hockey and curling. International federations that were allowing Russian and Belarusian athletes to compete under the AIN banner included the International Skating Union (ISU) for the various skating events, as well as the International Ski Mountaineering Federation (ISMF) for the ski mountaineering events. In all, 20 athletes (13 from Russia and seven from Belarus) competed at the Games. (Note: In alpine skiing, cross-country skiing, figure skating, freestyle skiing, luge, short-track speed skating, ski mountaineering and speed skating.) Benin, Guinea-Bissau, and the United Arab Emirates (UAE) all made their Winter Olympic debuts.

Participating National Olympic Committees
Albania (4); Andorra (7); Argentina (8); Armenia (5); Australia (51); Austria (115); Azerbaijan (2); Belgium (30); Benin (1); Bolivia (1); Bosnia and Herzegovina (5); Brazil (14); Bulgaria (20); Canada (205); Chile (4); China (125); Chinese Taipei (9); Colombia (1); Croatia (14); Cyprus (2); Czech Republic (115); Denmark (39); Ecuador (1); Eritrea (1); Estonia (31); Finland (103); France (160); Georgia (8); Germany (185); Great Britain (53); Greece (5); Guinea-Bissau (1); Haiti (2); Hong Kong (4); Hungary (16); Iceland (5); India (2); Individual Neutral Athletes (20); Iran (4); Ireland (4); Israel (9); Italy (196) (host); Jamaica (6); Japan (121); Kazakhstan (36); Kenya (1); Kosovo (2); Kyrgyzstan (2); Latvia (67); Lebanon (2); Liechtenstein (7); Lithuania (17); Luxembourg (2); Madagascar (2); Malaysia (1); Malta (1); Mexico (5); Moldova (5); Monaco (1); Mongolia (3); Montenegro (2); Morocco (2); Netherlands (38); New Zealand (17); Nigeria (1); North Macedonia (4); Norway (80); Pakistan (1); Philippines (2); Poland (59); Portugal (3); Puerto Rico (1); Romania (28); San Marino (1); Saudi Arabia (2); Serbia (3); Singapore (1); Slovakia (53); Slovenia (37); South Africa (5); South Korea (71); Spain (20); Sweden (110); Switzerland (175); Thailand (3); Trinidad and Tobago (6); Turkey (8); Ukraine (46); United Arab Emirates (2); United States (232); Uruguay (1); Uzbekistan (2); Venezuela (1)
NOCs that participated in 2026, but not in 2022	NOCs that participated in 2022, but not in 2026
Benin; Guinea-Bissau; Individual Neutral Athletes (Note: Individual Belarusian and Russian athletes compete as Individual Neutral Athletes due to the Russian invasion of Ukraine that began in 2022.); Kenya; Singapore; South Africa; United Arab Emirates; Uruguay; Venezuela	American Samoa; Belarus (Note: Belarusian athletes compete as Individual Neutral Athletes due to the Belarusian involvement in the Russian invasion of Ukraine that began in 2022.); Ghana; Peru; ROC (Note: Russian athletes compete as Individual Neutral Athletes due to the country's invasion of Ukraine that began in 2022.); Timor-Leste; Virgin Islands

=== Number of athletes by National Olympic Committee ===
Ranking	NOC	Athletes
1	United States	232
2	Canada	205
3	Italy	196
4	Germany	185
5	Switzerland	175
6	France	162
7	China	126
8	Japan	120
9	Austria	117
10	Czech Republic	115
11	Sweden	110
12	Finland	103
13	Norway	80
14	South Korea	71
15	Latvia	68
16	Poland	60
17	Great Britain	55
18	Australia	54
19	Slovakia	53
20	Ukraine	46
21	Denmark	39
22	Netherlands	38 (Note: Suzanne Schulting qualified for both short track and speed skating resulting in 38 athletes instead of 39.)
23	Slovenia	37
24	Kazakhstan	36
25	Estonia	32
26	Belgium	30
27	Romania	29
28	Bulgaria	20
28	Individual Neutral Athletes	20
28	Spain	20
31	Lithuania	17
31	New Zealand	17
33	Hungary	15
34	Brazil	14
34	Croatia	14
36	Israel	10
37	Chinese Taipei	9
38	Argentina	8
38	Georgia	8
38	Liechtenstein	8
38	Turkey	8
42	Andorra	7
42	Jamaica	7
44	Trinidad and Tobago	6
45	Armenia	5
45	Bosnia and Herzegovina	5
45	Greece	5
45	Mexico	5
45	Moldova	5
45	South Africa	5
51	Albania	4
51	Chile	4
51	Hong Kong	4
51	Iceland	4
51	Iran	4
51	Ireland	4
51	North Macedonia	4
58	Mongolia	3
58	Portugal	3
58	Serbia	3
58	Thailand	3
62	Azerbaijan	2
62	Cyprus	2
62	Haiti	2
62	India	2
62	Kenya	2
62	Kosovo	2
62	Kyrgyzstan	2
62	Lebanon	2
62	Luxembourg	2
62	Madagascar	2
62	Montenegro	2
62	Morocco	2
62	Philippines	2
62	Saudi Arabia	2
62	United Arab Emirates	2
62	Uzbekistan	2
78	Benin	1
78	Bolivia	1
78	Colombia	1
78	Ecuador	1
78	Eritrea	1
78	Guinea-Bissau	1
78	Malaysia	1
78	Malta	1
78	Monaco	1
78	Nigeria	1
78	Pakistan	1
78	Puerto Rico	1
78	San Marino	1
78	Singapore	1
78	Uruguay	1
78	Venezuela	1
Total		2,880

== Calendar ==
The first version of the 2026 Winter Olympics schedule was released in March 2024. Competitions started two days before the opening ceremony on 4 February with the mixed doubles event in curling, and ended on 22 February 2026, with the men's ice hockey tournament final. The second version of the schedule was released in December 2024.

OC	Opening ceremony	●	Event competitions	X	Event finals	EG	Exhibition gala	CC	Closing ceremony

February 2026	4th Wed	5th Thu	6th Fri	7th Sat	8th Sun	9th Mon	10th Tue	11th Wed	12th Thu	13th Fri	14th Sat	15th Sun	16th Mon	17th Tue	18th Wed	19th Thu	20th Fri	21st Sat	22nd Sun	Events
Ceremonies			OC																CC	—N/a
Alpine skiing				1	1	1	1	1	1		1	1	1		1					10
Biathlon					1		1	1		1	1	2		1	1		1	1		11
Bobsleigh												●	1	1			●	1	1	4
Cross-country skiing				1	1		2		1	1	1	1			2			1	1	12
Curling	●	●	●	●	●	●	1	●	●	●	●	●	●	●	●	●	●	1	1	3
Figure skating			●	●	1	●	●	1		1		●	1	●		1		EG		5
Freestyle skiing				●		1	1	1	1		1	1	1	1	1	●	3	2	1	15
Ice hockey		●	●	●	●	●	●	●	●	●	●	●	●	●	●	1	●	●	1	2
Luge				●	1	●	1	2	1											5
Nordic combined								1						1		1				3
Short-track speed skating							1		2		1		1		2		2			9
Skeleton									●	1	1	1								3
Ski jumping				1		1	1				1	1	1							6
Ski mountaineering																2		1		3
Snowboarding		●		1	2	1		●	2	2		1			2					11
Speed skating				1	1	1		1	1	1	1	1		2		1	1	2		14
Daily medal events	0	0	0	5	8	5	9	8	9	7	8	9	6	6	9	6	7	9	5	116
Cumulative total	0	0	0	5	13	18	27	35	44	51	59	68	74	80	89	95	102	111	116	116
February 2026	4th Wed	5th Thu	6th Fri	7th Sat	8th Sun	9th Mon	10th Tue	11th Wed	12th Thu	13th Fri	14th Sat	15th Sun	16th Mon	17th Tue	18th Wed	19th Thu	20th Fri	21st Sat	22nd Sun	Total events

== Medal table ==
* Host nation (Italy)

2026 Winter Olympics medal table (Note: Although the IOC does not include Individual Neutral Athletes in the official medal tables, they are listed here for comparison and historical purposes.)
Rank	NOC	Gold	Silver	Bronze	Total
1	Norway	18	12	11	41
2	United States	12	12	9	33
3	Netherlands	10	7	3	20
4	Italy*	10	6	14	30
5	Germany	8	10	8	26
6	France	8	9	6	23
7	Sweden	8	6	4	18
8	Switzerland	6	9	8	23
9	Austria	5	8	5	18
10	Japan	5	7	12	24
11–29	Remaining	26	32	35	93
Totals (29 entries)		116	118	115	349

Brazil and Georgia won their first Winter Olympic medals.

=== Podium sweeps ===
Date	Sport	Event	Team	Gold	Silver	Bronze	Ref
10 February	Cross-country skiing	Women's sprint	Sweden	Linn Svahn	Jonna Sundling	Maja Dahlqvist	
17 February	Bobsleigh	Two-man	Germany	Johannes Lochner, Georg Fleischhauer	Francesco Friedrich, Alexander Schüller	Adam Ammour, Alexander Schaller	
21 February	Cross-country skiing	Men's 50 kilometre classical	Norway	Johannes Høsflot Klæbo	Martin Løwstrøm Nyenget	Emil Iversen	

== Marketing ==
The overall branding of the 2026 Winter Olympics was influenced by Italian gesticulation, "harmony", and the "new Italian Spirit"; one of the main visual elements were "Vibes"—abstract designs consisting of curved lines intended to convey the themes of "creativity", "energy", "imagination", "passion", and "style". Five celebrity ambassadors were chosen to respectively symbolise the themes in promotion for the Games, including musician Dardust, Paralympic fencer Bebe Vio, comedian Federico Basso, chef Davide Oldani, and dancer Nicoletta Manni. The event pictograms were similarly inspired by gesture drawing.

For the first time, an Olympic emblem was determined via a public vote: two designs by Landor Associates were unveiled on 6 March 2021, during the Sanremo Music Festival final, with the winning design—"Futura"—announced on 30 March 2021. The emblem consists of a stylised "26" written in a single stroke, representing the impact of "small gestures" and "sport, solidarity and sustainability". During the 2022 Sanremo Music Festival finals on 5 February, the two final candidates for the official anthem of the event were presented, with a poll opening afterward. On 7 March 2022, "Fino all'alba" ("Until the dawn")—composed by the youth music group La Cittadina of the San Pietro Martire in Seveso, and performed during Sanremo by Arisa—was announced as the winner.

The Games' official slogan, "IT's Your Vibe", was announced on 23 February 2025. It used "IT" as both an abbreviation for Italy and as the contraction "It's", with variants of the slogan used in other contexts to reflect upon the Games and its host country. Official art posters were developed in collaboration with the Triennale Milano exhibition, including 10 works commissioned from emerging Italian artists (five representing the Olympics and five representing the Paralympics), and two "iconic" posters for the Olympics and Paralympics by Olimpia Zagnoli and Carolina Altavill, respectively.

=== Mascot ===
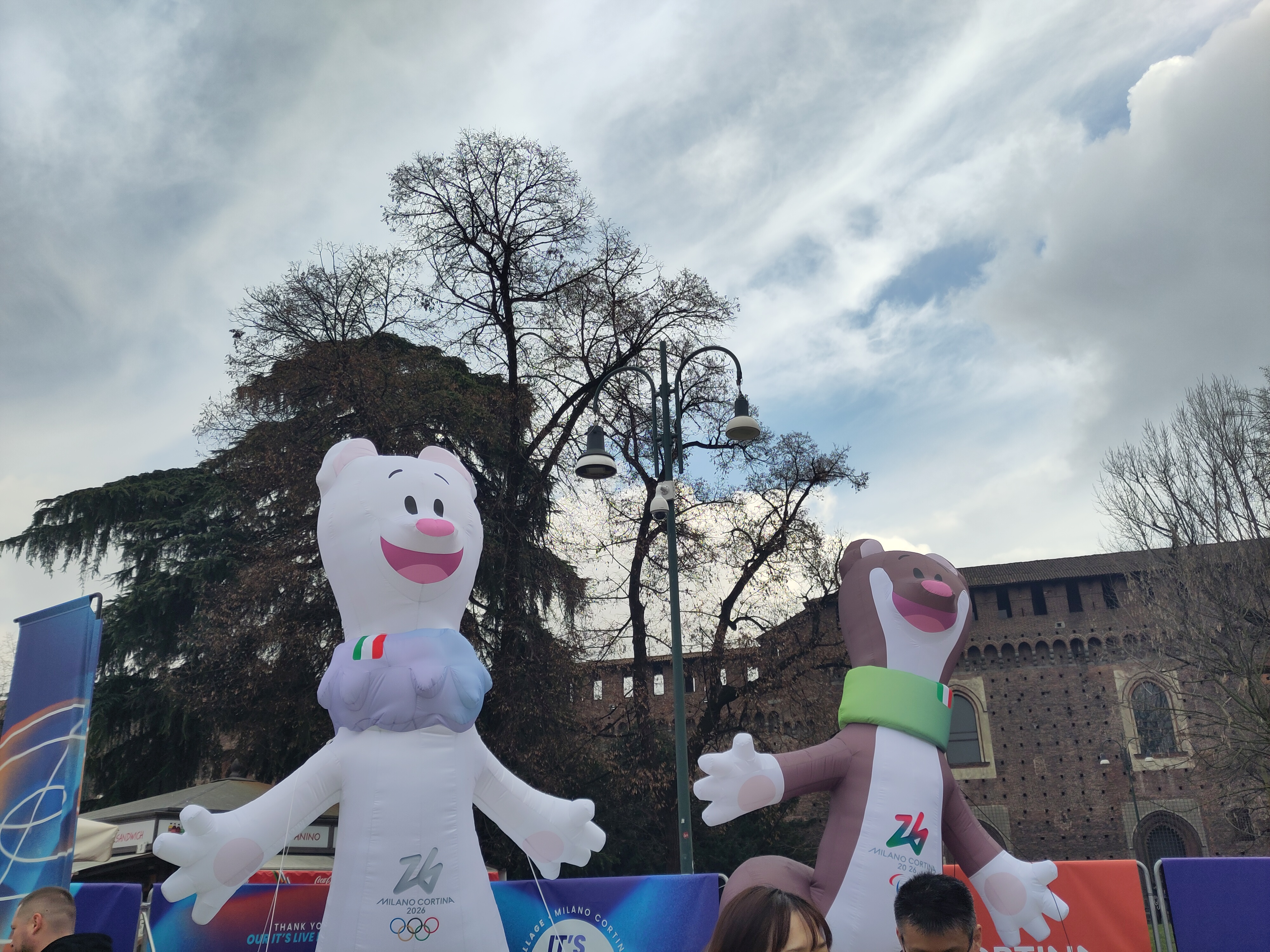
Tina and Milo

An online vote closing on 28 February 2023, was held to select the two mascots for the event. The winning candidates, designed by the students of a school in Taverna and inspired by stoats, were presented during the second night of the 2024 Sanremo Music Festival on 7 February. Their names were revealed to be Tina and Milo (derived from the names of the host cities) and are portrayed as sister and brother.

The choice of stoats was explained as being due to these animals' embodiment of "the contemporary Italian spirit" of curiosity, ability to change according to the seasons, and capacity of adaptation to challenging habitats. The two main mascots were accompanied by six snowdrop flowers, called "The Flo".

Milo, a brown stoat, and Tina, a white stoat, were brother and sister "born in the mountains of Italy", who "decided to move to the city". Tina, the main Olympic mascot, symbolised art, music, and the transformative force of beauty. Milo, the Paralympic mascot, was born without a leg but used his tail to help him lead a normal life with some ingenuity, willpower, and creativity.

== Broadcasting ==
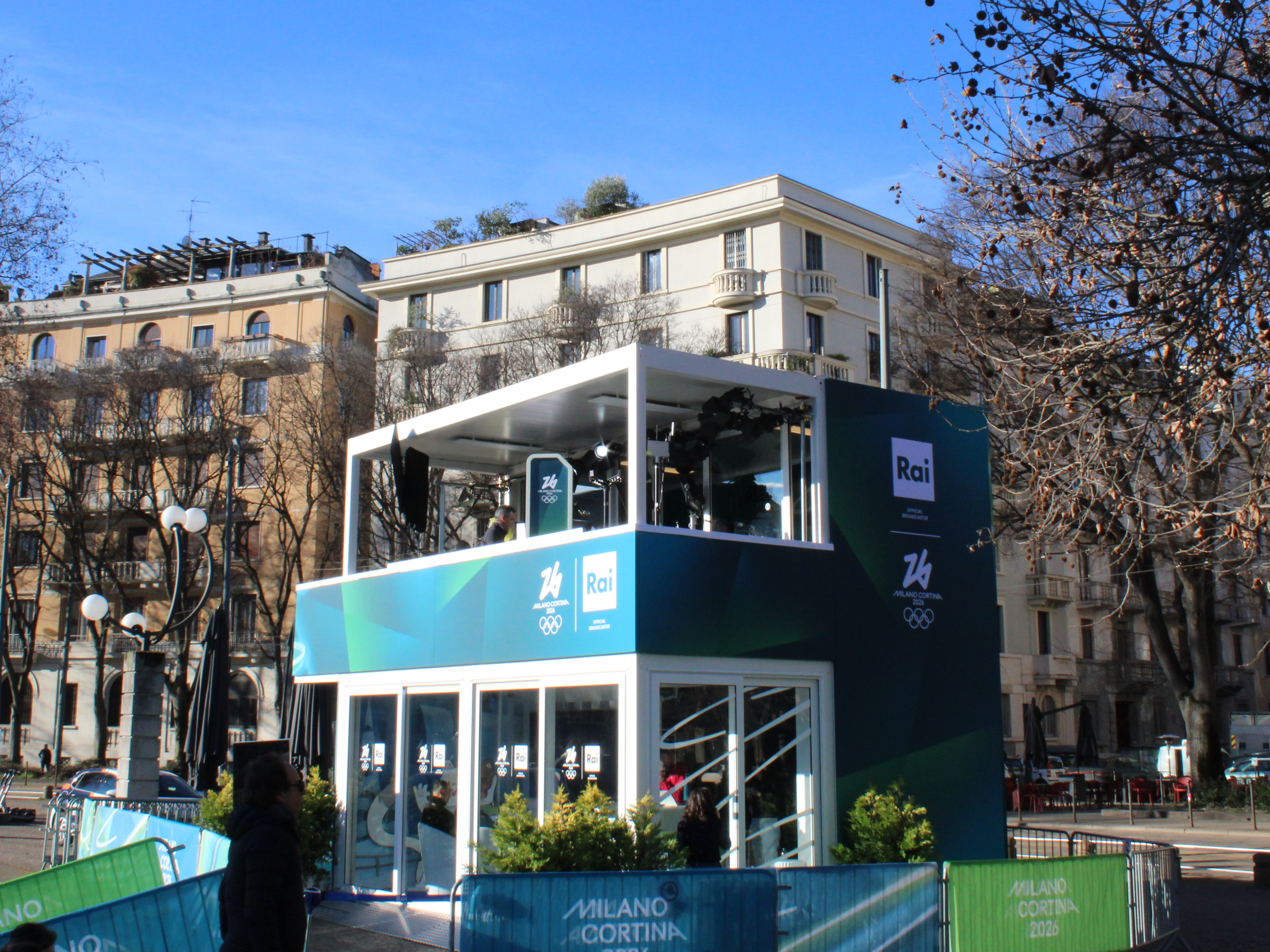
RAI's Winter Olympics studio at Porta Sempione.

Olympic Broadcasting Services (OBS) produced over 6,500 hours of content during the Games, ranging from unilateral broadcast feeds to other forms of video content usable by rightsholders.

In Europe, the 2026 Winter Olympics were the first covered by a renewal of Warner Bros. Discovery's pan-European rights to the Olympics through 2032, encompassing rights across digital and pay television in 49 European territories. As part of the agreement, WBD sublicensed a package of free-to-air rights to the European Broadcasting Union (EBU) and its members—including Italy's state-owned broadcaster RAI—covering at least 100 hours of coverage of each Winter Olympics. This was in contrast to the previous contract, where corporate predecessor Discovery was responsible for selling the free-to-air rights.

After being used for the first time at the 2024 Summer Olympics in mountain biking, OBS expanded its use of FPV drones for new camera angles during skiing and sliding events. Omnidirectional cameras were also used to enable stroboscopic "freeze-frame" and multi-angle instant replays. OBS expanded its use of artificial intelligence (AI) to transcribe and tag scenes from events using computer vision and semantic data, as well as the ability to automatically curate tailored highlights for media distribution. Rai and the EBU conducted trials of 5G Broadcast during the Games.

== Concerns and controversies ==
The Olympics were accompanied by various controversies related to corruption among Italian organisers, which included scandals involving host personnel and delays in building venues; and the participation of athletes from Iran, Israel, and Russia amidst ongoing military conflicts. During the Games, other incidents included restrictions on athlete expression by the IOC, along with allegations of cheating in some sports.

== See also ==
- 2026 Winter Paralympics
- Olympic Games held in Italy
  - 1956 Winter Olympics – Cortina D'Ampezzo
  - 1960 Summer Olympics – Rome
  - 2006 Winter Olympics – Turin
  - 2026 Winter Olympics – Milan and Cortina D'Ampezzo
- List of IOC country codes
- 2026 Summer Youth Olympics – Multi-sport event in Dakar, Senegal

== Notes ==
Winter Olympics
Preceded by Beijing	XXV Olympic Winter Games; Milan–Cortina d'Ampezzo; 2026	Succeeded by Alps
