= Philip Boit =

Kenyan cross-country skier

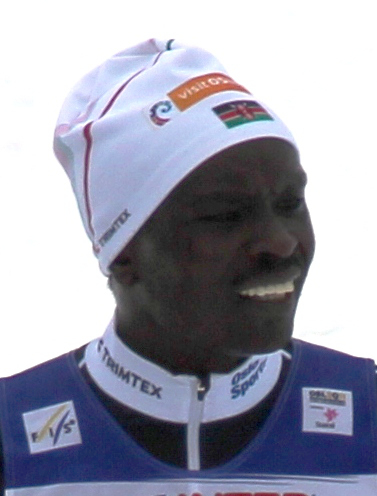
Philip Boit at the 2011 World Championships

Philip Kimely Boit (born 12 December 1971 in Eldoret, Kenya) is a cross-country skier and the first Kenyan to participate in the Winter Olympics. His first name is sometimes spelled as "Phillip".

== 1996–98 ==
Philip Boit and compatriot Henry Bitok trained in Finland to become competitive skiers. Both were former middle-distance runners with no previous skiing experience. Their project was sponsored by sportswear giant Nike. Winter training began in February 1996. Kenya had only one slot for the 1998 Winter Olympics in Nagano, which was taken by Boit, while Bitok finished his skiing career soon after. Boit's participation in the games gained worldwide media coverage. He finished 92nd and last in the 10-kilometer classic race. The awards for the race were delayed while winner Bjørn Dæhlie waited for Boit to reach the finish line to embrace him.

== 1999 ==
Boit participated in the 1999 Nordic skiing World Championships in Ramsau, Austria, and again finished last in the 10 km classic event. After the event, Nike dropped their sponsorship and Boit was forced to settle for "dry training" in Kenya for the next two years.

== 2002–10 ==
In the 2002 Winter Olympics in Salt Lake City, Boit finished 64th in the sprint race, beating three competitors. After the Salt Lake City Olympics Boit left competitive skiing again, but came back to participate in the 2006 Winter Olympics in Turin where he finished 92nd in the 15 km Classic, ahead of five fellow competitors. Boit said in a 2006 interview that he was planning to retire after the 2010 Winter Olympics to be held in Vancouver.

In 2007, he competed in the World Ski Championships held in Sapporo, Japan, the same country where he started his Olympic career.

== 2010–11 ==
Boit had planned to retire after the 2010 Winter Olympics. However, he did not meet the requirements needed to start in the Games as he missed the limit by two FIS points. His attempts to qualify for the Olympics had been hampered by illness. After missing the Olympics, Boit decided to continue his career by a year and retire after the 2011 World Championships to be held in Oslo, Norway. Boit finished 42nd during qualification, and therefore was unable to compete in the 15 kilometre classical.

== Education ==
After graduating from Samwayi Secondary School, he was recruited to the General Service Unit in 1992, where was able to enhance his athletics career. As an athlete, he was a bit behind the top Kenyan runners. His 800 meter personal best is 1:46.06.

== Family ==
Philip's uncle Mike Boit won the bronze medal in the 800 meters at the 1972 Summer Olympics in Munich.

== See also ==
- Lamine Guèye (skier)
- Eddie "The Eagle" Edwards
- Eric Moussambani
- Paula Barila Bolopa
- Rachael Gunn

Olympic Games
Preceded by Paul Tergat	Flag bearer for Kenya; Nagano 1998	Succeeded by Kennedy Ochieng
Preceded by Kennedy Ochieng	Flag bearer for Kenya; Salt Lake City 2002	Succeeded by Violet Barasa
Preceded by Violet Barasa	Flag bearer for Kenya; Turin 2006	Succeeded by Grace Kwamboka Momanyi
