= National Olympic Committee of Kenya =

National Olympic Committee

National Olympic Committee – Kenya
- Country/Region: Kenya
- Code: KEN
- Created: 1955
- Recognized: 1955
- Continental Association: ANOCA
- Headquarters: Nairobi, Kenya
- President: Shadrack Maluki Kitili
- Secretary General: John Onyango Ogolla
- Website: teamkenya.or.ke

The National Olympic Committee – Kenya (IOC code: KEN) is the National Olympic Committee representing Kenya. It was created in 1955 and recognised by the IOC that same year.

Kenya made its debut at the 1956 Summer Olympics in Melbourne, Australia.

The current president of the National Olympic Committee - Kenya is Shadrack Maluki Kitili who was elected on 21 July 2025. He takes over from the distance running legend Paul Tergat who was elected in 2017. He took over from another distance running legend Kipchoge Keino who had been in charge since 1999.

== President ==
- 1999 to 2017 – Kipchoge Keino
- 2017 to 2025 – Paul Tergat
- 2025 - Shadrack Maluki Kitili

== See also ==
- Kenya at the Olympics
- Kenya at the Commonwealth Games
